= Morag Pearce =

English footballer

Personal information
- Full name: Morag Pearce
- Birth name: Morag Kirkland
- Place of birth: Southampton, England
- Position: Right-back

Senior career*
Years	Team	Apps	(Gls)
1971-1984	Southampton Women's F.C.		

International career
1972–1984	England	41	(0)
- * Club domestic league appearances and goals

Morag "Maggie" Pearce (née Kirkland) is a former England women's international footballer who played as a right-back. She competed at the 1984 European Competition for Women's Football where England lost against Sweden in the final. She won five Women's FA Cups with Southampton during the 1970s.

== Club career ==
Pearce won her first WFA Cup in 1973 when Southampton beat Westthorn United L.F.C. After a defeat to Fodens in 1974, Pearce celebrated a second WFA Cup victory in 1975 against Warminster and a third versus QPR in 1976. Southampton lost in the 1977 final to QPR but Pearce and her teammates got revenge with a record 8–2 win in 1978 at Wexham Park. She won her fifth and final WFA Cup at Jubilee Park, Waterlooville in 1979 when Southampton beat Lowestoft Ladies.

== International career ==
Pearce made her England debut at 15 years old.

Pearce played in England's first ever official match on 18 November 1972 when they beat Scotland 3–2 at Ravenscraig Stadium, Greenock. In November 2022, Pearce was recognized by The Football Association as one of the England national team's legacy players, and as the 2nd women's player to be capped by England.

== Personal life ==
Pearce has a sister, Heather Kirkland, who also played for Southampton and won four WFA Cups between 1976 and 1981.

== Honours ==
Southampton

- FA Women's Cup:1972-73 WFA Cup 1974–75 WFA Cup, 1975–76 WFA Cup, 1977–78 WFA Cup, 1978–79 WFA Cup
