= Lynda Hale =

English footballer (1954–2026)

Personal information
- Date of birth: 23 February 1954
- Place of birth: Woolston, Southampton, England
- Date of death: 26 February 2026 (aged 72)
- Position: Winger

Senior career*
Years	Team	Apps	(Gls)
1972–1982	Southampton Women's F.C.		

International career
1972–1977	England	10	(3)
- * Club domestic league appearances and goals

Lynda Hale (23 February 1954 – 26 February 2026) was an English footballer who played as a winger. She represented the England national team at senior international level and spent most of her career at Southampton Women's F.C.

== Club career ==
Hale made her debut for Southampton in a 9–0 victory over Ipswich at the Royal Victoria Hospital in Netley. Hale won the Women's FA Cup seven times with Southampton and played in nine consecutive finals including the first ever final in 1971 against Stewarton Thistle which Southampton won 4–1. She scored in the 1973 and 1975 finals against Westthorn United and Warminster respectively, which Southampton both won. She played in all three consecutive finals vs QPR, winning in 1976 and 1978. Her last appearance in a WFA Cup final came in 1979 when they beat Lowestoft Ladies 1–0 at Jubilee Park, Waterlooville.

== International career ==
Hale played in England's first ever international match on 18 November 1972 after attending regional and national trials. England played against Scotland at Ravenscraig Stadium, Greenock, with England winning 3–2. Hale scored in the match.

== Later life and death ==
In November 2022, Hale was recognized by The Football Association as one of the England national team's legacy players, and as the seventh women's player to be capped by England.

On 2 March 2026, it was announced that Hale had died from idiopathic pulmonary fibrosis on 26 February, aged 72.

== Honors ==
Southampton

- FA Women's Cup: 1970–71, 1971–72, 1972–73, 1974–75, 1975–76, 1977–78, 1978–79
