= Linda Coffin =

English footballer

Personal information
- Position: Defender

Senior career*
Years	Team	Apps	(Gls)
- Southampton Women's F.C.
- Red Star Southampton

International career
1976-1982	England	28	(1)
- * Club domestic league appearances and goals

Linda Coffin is a former England women's international footballer who played as a centre half. Coffin won the Women's FA Cup four times with Southampton Women's F.C.

== Club career ==
Coffin's first appearance in a WFA Cup final came in 1974 when her Southampton team were beaten by Fodens. She celebrated success in the 1975 and 1976 finals with victories over Warminster and QPR. Coffin's father Noel Coffin was the team manager in the 1974, 1975 and 1976 finals. After losing the 1977 final to QPR, Coffin then transferred to QPR and lost the 1978 final against her former club Southampton 8–2 at Wexham Park, Slough. She returned to Southampton and won the WFA Cup for a third time in 1979 against Lowestoft Ladies. Her last cup win came in 1981 at Knowsley Road after a 4–2 win versus St Helens.

In 1986 she joined Red Star Southampton and later played for both Brighton & Hove Albion and Reading Royals.

== International career ==
Coffin made her debut on 22 May 1976 when England played Wales. Her teammates later nicknamed her 'The Rock'. In November 2022, Coffin was recognized by The Football Association as one of the England national team's legacy players, and as the 28th women's player to be capped by England.

== Honours ==
Southampton

- FA Women's Cup: 1974–75, 1975–76, 1978-79, 1980-81
