= 1978 WFA Cup final =

1978 WFA Cup Final
- Event: 1977–78 WFA Cup
| Southampton | Queen's Park Rangers |
| 8 | 2 |
- Date: 30 April 1978
- Venue: Wexham Park Stadium, Slough
- Referee: Clive White
- Attendance: 2,000

The 1978 WFA Cup Final was the eighth final of the FA Women's Cup, England's primary cup competition for women's football teams. It was the eight final to be held under the direct control of Women's Football Association (WFA). Southampton and Queen's Park Rangers contested the match at Wexham Park Stadium, the home of Slough Town on 30 April 1978. The match ended 8–2 in favour of Southampton.

== Match details ==
30 April 1978
15:00 BST

| Southampton | 8–2 | Queen's Park Rangers |
|---|---|---|
| Davies; Lopez; Chapman | Report | Choat; Staley |

Wexham Park Stadium, Slough
Attendance: 200
Referee: Clive White

| GK | 1 | (England) Sue Buckett (c) |
| DF | 2 | (England) Heather Kirkland |
| DF | 3 | (England) Maggie Pearce |
| DF | 4 | (Scotland) Ann Squires |
| DF | 5 | (England) Sharon Roberts |
| MF | 6 | (England) Grace Cesareo |
| MF | 7 | (England) Lynda Hale |
| MF | 8 | (England) Pat Chapman |
| MF | 9 | (England) Pat Davies |
| FW | 10 | (England) Sue Lopez |
| FW | 11 | (England) Hilary Carter |
Substitutes:
| FW | 12 | (England) Julie Bevis |
| GK | 13 | (England) Julie Clarke |
| | 14 | (England) Andrea Smith |
| | 15 | (Nigeria) Taiwo Adeogun |
| | 16 | (Nigeria) Keminde Adeogun |
| | 17 | (England) Andrea Crouch |
| | 18 | (England) Jackie Richards |
| DF | 19 | (England) Jill Long |
Manager:
(England) Charlie Clarke

| GK | 1 | (England) Pat Cavanagh |
| DF | 2 | (England) Cora Francis (c) |
| DF | 3 | (England) Pauline Gardner |
| DF | 4 | (England) Paddy McGroarty |
| DF | 5 | (England) Linda Coffin |
| MF | 6 | (England) Maggie Flanagan |
| MF | 7 | (England) Sandra Choat |
| MF | 8 | (England) Jackie Green |
| MF | 9 | (England) Carrie Staley |
| FW | 10 | (England) Josie Lee |
| FW | 11 | (England) Hazel Ross | Substituted off |
Substitutes:
| FW | 12 | (England) Annie Richardson | Substituted on |
| | 13 | (England) Sue Bradley |
| | 14 | (England) Geraldine McGuire |
Manager:
(England) Sav Ramayon
