= 1973–74 WFA Cup =

Tournament details
- Country: England & Wales

Final positions
- Champions: Fodens
- Runners-up: Southampton
- Penalty shoot-outs do not count towards the total number of goals.

The 1973–74 WFA Cup was an association football knockout tournament for women's teams, held between 7 October 1973 and 28 April 1974. It was the 4th season of the WFA Cup and was won by Fodens, who defeated Southampton in the final.

The tournament consisted of seven rounds of competition proper.

All match results and dates from the Women's FA Cup Website.

== Group 1 ==
Only known matches shown

=== Teams ===
- Dundee Strikers
- Edinburgh Dynamo
- Harmony Row
- Lee's
- Motherwell A.E.I.
- Westthorn United

=== Third round proper ===
All games were originally scheduled for 6, 9 and 13 January 1974.

Tie	Home team (tier)	Score	Away team (tier)	Att.
1	Westthorn United	11–1	Edinburgh Dynamo	

=== Fourth round proper ===
All games were originally scheduled for 3 February 1974.

Tie	Home team (tier)	Score	Away team (tier)	Att.
1	Westthorn United	8–0	Harmony Row	

== Group 2 ==
Only known matches shown

=== Teams ===
- Ashton
- Barrow
- Blackpool Seabirds
- Buxted Chicks
- E.R.F. Sandbach
- Fleece Fillies
- Fodens
- Halton
- Liverpool
- Macclesfield
- Prestatyn
- Preston Dolphins
- Preston North End
- Southport
- Wallsend

=== Second round proper ===
All games were originally scheduled for 18 November and 2 and 9 December 1973.

Tie	Home team (tier)	Score	Away team (tier)	Att.
1	Fodens	8–1	Southport	

=== Third round proper ===
All games were originally scheduled for 6, 9 and 13 January 1974.

Tie	Home team (tier)	Score	Away team (tier)	Att.
1	Fodens	3–0	Prestatyn	
2	Preston North End	6–1	Liverpool	

=== Fourth round proper ===
All games were originally scheduled for 3 February 1974.

Tie	Home team (tier)	Score	Away team (tier)	Att.
1	Fodens	3–0	Preston North End	

== Group 3 ==
Only known matches shown

=== Teams ===
- Boston Budgies
- Carr Fastener
- County Canaries
- EMGALS
- Fishtoft
- Forest
- Leicester City Supporters Club
- Notts County
- Notts Rangers
- Polesworth
- Taverners Pilgrims

=== First round proper ===
All games were scheduled for 7 and 14 October 1973.

Tie	Home team (tier)	Score	Away team (tier)	Att.
1	Fishtoft	1–5	Forest Rangers	
2	Polesworth	?–?	Carr Fastener	
3	Taverners Pilgrims	5–0	County Canaries	
Bye: Boston Budgies

=== Second round proper ===
All games were originally scheduled for 18 November and 2 and 9 December 1973.

Tie	Home team (tier)	Score	Away team (tier)	Att.
1	Boston Budgies	0–6	EMGALS	
2	Notts Rangers	?–?	Polesworth	
3	Leicester City Supporters Club	4–5	Taverners Pilgrims	

=== Third round proper ===
All games were originally scheduled for 6, 9 and 13 January 1974.

Tie	Home team (tier)	Score	Away team (tier)	Att.
1	Notts Rangers	2–2 (a.e.t.)	Taverners Pilgrims	
replay	Taverners Pilgrims	4–2	Notts Rangers	
Bye: Emgals

=== Fourth round proper ===
All games were originally scheduled for 3 February 1974.

Tie	Home team (tier)	Score	Away team (tier)	Att.
1	Taverners Pilgrims	1–7	EMGALS	

== Group 4 ==
Only known matches shown

=== Teams ===
- Beccles
- East Harling
- Junior High School
- Lowestoft
- Pye
- Rushden
- Suffolk Bluebirds
- Watney Mann
- Woodbridge American

=== First round proper ===
All games were scheduled for 7 and 14 October 1973.

Tie	Home team (tier)	Score	Away team (tier)	Att.
1	East Harling	10–0	Rushden	
Bye: Lowestoft

=== Second round proper ===
All games were originally scheduled for 18 November and 2 and 9 December 1973.

Tie	Home team (tier)	Score	Away team (tier)	Att.
1	East Harling	2–8	Suffolk Bluebirds	
2	Lowestoft	4–1	Beccles	

=== Third round proper ===
All games were originally scheduled for 6, 9 and 13 January 1974.

Tie	Home team (tier)	Score	Away team (tier)	Att.
1	Suffolk Bluebirds	7–2	East Harling	
2	Watney Mann	0–13	Lowestoft	

=== Fourth round proper ===
All games were originally scheduled for 3 February 1974.

Tie	Home team (tier)	Score	Away team (tier)	Att.
1	Lowestoft	3–4	Suffolk Bluebirds	

== Group 5 ==
Only known matches shown

=== Teams ===
- Bedworth
- Birmingham City
- Chelles Belles
- Coventry Bantams
- Evesham North End
- G.E.C. / A.E.I.
- Holbrooks Athletic
- Kays
- Luton Daytel
- Milton Keynes
- Red Star Rangers
- Town & County
- Trent Valley Angels
- Wanderers (Nuneaton)

=== Second round proper ===
All games were originally scheduled for 18 November and 2 and 9 December 1973.

Tie	Home team (tier)	Score	Away team (tier)	Att.
1	Wanderers (Nuneaton)	3–3 (a.e.t.)	Chelles Belles	
replay	Chelles Belles	?–?	Wanderers (Nuneaton)	

=== Third round proper ===
All games were originally scheduled for 6, 9 and 13 January 1974.

Tie	Home team (tier)	Score	Away team (tier)	Att.
1	Chelles Belles	2–2 (a.e.t.)	G.E.C. / A.E.I.	
replay	G.E.C. / A.E.I.	1–2	Chelles Belles	
2	Coventry Bantams	?–? (a.e.t.)	Evesham North End	
replay	Evesham North End	2–1	Coventry Bantams	

=== Fourth round proper ===
All games were originally scheduled for 3 February 1974.

Tie	Home team (tier)	Score	Away team (tier)	Att.
1	Evesham North End	2–3	Chelles Belles	

== Group 6 ==
Only known matches shown

=== Teams ===
- Ashford Town
- Barnfield United
- Brighton G.P.O.
- Courthope
- Dartford College
- Guildford United
- Hellingly Hospital
- Herne Bay Ladybirds
- Maidstone
- West Sussex
- White Wanderers (Hamstreet)

=== First round proper ===
All games were scheduled for 7 and 14 October 1973.

Tie	Home team (tier)	Score	Away team (tier)	Att.
1	Maidstone	6–0	Guildford City	

=== Second round proper ===
All games were originally scheduled for 18 November and 2 and 9 December 1973.

Tie	Home team (tier)	Score	Away team (tier)	Att.
1	Courthope	2–0	Herne Bay Ladybirds	
2	Hellingly Hospital	5–0	Dartford College	
3	Maidstone	1–2 (a.e.t.)	Ashford Town	

=== Third round proper ===
All games were originally scheduled for 6, 9 and 13 January 1974.

Tie	Home team (tier)	Score	Away team (tier)	Att.
1	Ashford Town	2–1	Hellingly Hospital	
2	Brighton G.P.O.	2–1	Courthope	

=== Fourth round proper ===
All games were originally scheduled for 3 February 1974.

Tie	Home team (tier)	Score	Away team (tier)	Att.
1	Brighton G.P.O.	6–5	Ashford Town	

== Group 7 ==
Only known matches shown

=== Teams ===
- Amersham Angels
- Crystal Palace
- Fulham
- Gallaher
- Queens Park Rangers
- Southampton
- Southend
- Spurs
- Swaythling
- Thame
- Totten United

=== First round proper ===
All games were scheduled for 7 and 14 October 1973.

Tie	Home team (tier)	Score	Away team (tier)	Att.
1	Amersham Angels	5–1	Thame	
2	Southend	0–3	Fulham	

=== Second round proper ===
All games were originally scheduled for 18 November and 2 and 9 December 1973.

Tie	Home team (tier)	Score	Away team (tier)	Att.
1	Fulham	10–1	Gallaher	
2	Queens Park Rangers	3–4	Amersham Angels	

=== Third round proper ===
All games were originally scheduled for 6, 9 and 13 January 1974.

Tie	Home team (tier)	Score	Away team (tier)	Att.
1	Amersham Angels	2–0 (a.e.t.)	Fulham	
2	Southampton	3–0	Crystal Palace	

=== Fourth round proper ===
All games were originally scheduled for 3 February 1974.

Tie	Home team (tier)	Score	Away team (tier)	Att.
1	Southampton	6–1	Amersham Angels	

== Group 8 ==
Only known matches shown

=== Teams ===
- Avon County Rangers
- Bath City
- Bracknell Bullets
- Bristol
- Bristol Bluebirds
- Compton Wanderers
- Cope Chat
- Devizes Moonrakers
- Eastville
- Farmborough
- Johnson Rangers
- Swindon Spitfires
- Warminster Town
- West End Wanderers

=== Third round proper ===
All games were originally scheduled for 6, 9 and 13 January 1974.

Tie	Home team (tier)	Score	Away team (tier)	Att.
1	Cope Chat	10–0	Avon County Rangers	
2	Swindon Spitfires	6–1	Devizes Moonrakers	

=== Fourth round proper ===
All games were originally scheduled for 3 February 1974.

Tie	Home team (tier)	Score	Away team (tier)	Att.
1	Cope Chat	1–2	Swindon Spitfires	

== Quarter–finals ==
All games were played on 3 March 1974.

Tie	Home team (tier)	Score	Away team (tier)	Att.
1	EMGALS	0–8	Westthorn United	
2	Southampton	7–1	Chelles Belles	
3	Suffolk Bluebirds	2–9	Fodens	
4	Swindon Spitfires	1–0	Brighton G.P.O.	

== Semi–finals ==
All games were played on 31 March 1974.

Tie	Home team (tier)	Score	Away team (tier)	Att.
1	Swindon Spitfires	0–2	Fodens	
2	Westthorn United	0–2 (a.e.t.)	Southampton	

== Third place playoff ==
All games were played on 28 April 1974.

Tie	Home team (tier)	Score	Away team (tier)	Att.
1	Swindon Spitfires	0–5	Westthorn United	

== Final ==
28 April 1974
15:30 BST

Southampton	1–2	Fodens
Davies	Report	Leatherbarrow

The Eyrie, Bedford
Attendance: 800
Referee: D.G. Martin
