= 1976 WFA Cup final =

- Event: 1975–76 WFA Cup
Southampton	Queen's Park Rangers
2	1
- Date: 25 April 1976
- Venue: The Eyrie, Bedford
- Referee: John Hunting
- Attendance: 1,500

The 1976 WFA Cup final was the sixth final of the Women's FA Cup, England's primary cup competition for women's football teams. It was also the sixth final to be held under the direct control of Women's Football Association (WFA). Southampton and Queen's Park Rangers contested the match at The Eyrie, the former home of Bedford Town on 25 April 1976. The match ended 2–1 in favour of Southampton.

== Match details ==
25 April 1976
14:30 BST

Southampton	2–1 (a.e.t.)	Queen's Park Rangers
M. Kirkland; Davies	Report	McGroarty

The Eyrie, Bedford
Attendance: 1,500
Referee: John Hunting

GK	1	(England) Sue Buckett (c)
DF	2	(England) Beverley Gain
DF	3	(England) Maggie Pearce
DF	4	(Scotland) Ann Squires
DF	5	(England) Linda Coffin
MF	6	(England) Grace Cesareo
MF	7	(England) Lynda Hale
MF	8	(England) Pauline Dickie
MF	9	(England) Pat Davies
FW	10	(England) Hilary Carter
FW	11	(England) Pat Chapman
Substitutes:
FW	12	(England) Cathy Bennett
GK	13	(England) Heather Kirkland
FW	14	(England) Julie Bevis
Manager:
(England) Noel Coffin

GK	1	(England) Pat Cavanagh
DF	2	(England) Cora Francis
DF	3	(England) Pauline Gardner
DF	4	(England) Paddy McGroarty (c)
DF	5	(England) Maggie Flanagan
MF	6	(England) Joan Clements
MF	7	(England) Sandra Choat
MF	8	(England) Judith Orsmond
MF	9	(England) Carrie Staley
FW	10	(England) Josie Lee
FW	11	(England) Hazel Ross
Substitutes:
FW	12	(England) Jackie Green
	13	(England) Janet Brownbill
	14	(England) Sue Francis
Manager:
(England) Sav Ramayon
