= Sue Buckett =

English footballer

Personal information
- Birth name: Susan Buckett
- Place of birth: Wokingham, England
- Height: 5 ft 4 in (1.62 m)
- Position: Goalkeeper

Senior career*
Years	Team	Apps	(Gls)
1966–1986	Southampton Women's F.C.		
1986–1999	Red Star Southampton		

International career
1972–1980	England	29	(0)
- * Club domestic league appearances and goals

Sue Buckett is a former England women's international footballer. She represented England at senior international level and spent most of her career at Southampton Women's F.C. Buckett won the Women's FA Cup eight times between 1971 and 1981 and was the first ever goalkeeper to save a penalty in the competition's final.

== Club career ==
Buckett won the WFA Cup eight times with Southampton and was captain in six of their winning finals. Her first winners medal came in 1971 when they beat Stewarton Thistle 4–1 at Crystal Palace National Sports Centre. Buckett has the distinction of being the first ever goalkeeper to save a penalty in a WFA Cup final which she achieved in 1975, when she saved a penalty taken by Eileen Foreman of Warminster. Southampton won the game 4–2. Her eighth and final success in the competition came in 1981 when Southampton defeated reigning champions St Helens at Knowsley Road. She reached the final again in 1992 with Red Star Southampton, but they lost 4–0 to Doncaster Belles in the final at Prenton Park. Buckett was also an unused substitute in the 1999 final when the renamed Southampton Saints were beaten by Arsenal.

== International career ==
Buckett made her first appearance for England in their first ever official match. England played against Scotland on 18 November 1972 in Greenock, winning 3–2. In November 2022, Buckett was recognized by The Football Association as one of the England national team's legacy players, and as the 1st women's player to be capped by England.

== Honours ==
Southampton

- FA Women's Cup: 1970–71, 1971–72, 1972–73, 1974–75, 1975–76, 1977–78, 1978–79, 1980–81
