= 1977 WFA Cup final =

1977 WFA Cup Final
- The match programme cover
- Event: 1976–77 WFA Cup
Southampton	Queen's Park Rangers
0	1
- Date: 15 May 1977
- Venue: Champion Hill, London
- Referee: J. E. Bent

The 1977 WFA Cup Final was the seventh final of the FA Women's Cup, England's primary cup competition for women's football teams. It was the seventh final to be held under the direct control of Women's Football Association (WFA). Southampton and Queen's Park Rangers contested the match at Champion Hill, the home of Dulwich Hamlet on 15 May 1977. The match ended 1–0 to Queen's Park Rangers and became the first London women's club to win the FA Women's Cup.

== Match details ==
=== Summary ===
15 May 1977
15:00 BST

Southampton	0–1	Queen's Park Rangers
	Report	Staley 25'

Champion Hill, London
Referee: J. E. Bent

GK	1	(England) Sue Buckett (c)
DF	2	(England) Heather Kirkland
DF	3	(England) Maggie Pearce
DF	4	(Scotland) Ann Squires
DF	5	(England) Linda Coffin
MF	6	(England) Grace Cesareo
MF	7	(England) Lynda Hale
MF	8	(England) Pat Chapman
MF	9	(England) Pat Davies
FW	10	(England) Sue Lopez
FW	11	(England) Hilary Carter
Substitutes:
FW	12	(England) Cathy Bennett
MF	13	(England) Lesley Lloyd
DF	14	(England) Jill Long
Manager:
(England) Dave Case

GK	1	(England) Pat Napier
DF	2	(England) Cora Francis
DF	3	(England) Pauline Gardner
DF	4	(England) Paddy McGroarty (c)
DF	5	(England) Jackie Green
MF	6	(England) Maggie Flanagan
MF	7	(England) Sandra Choat
MF	8	(England) Ann Richardson
MF	9	(England) Carrie Staley
FW	10	(England) Josie Lee
FW	11	(England) Hazel Ross
Substitutes:
FW	12	(England) Pauline Dickie
GK	13	(England) Jean Cantrell
Manager:
(England) Sav Ramayon
