= 1973 WFA Cup final =

1973 WFA Cup Final
- Event: 1972–73 WFA Cup
Southampton	Westthorn United
2	0
- Date: 29 April 1973
- City: The Eyrie, Bedford
- Referee: J. Parsons
- Attendance: 3,000

The 1973 WFA Cup Final was the third final of the WFA Cup, England's primary cup competition for women's football teams. The showpiece event was played under the auspices of the Women's Football Association (WFA). Southampton and Westthorn United contested the match at The Eyrie, the former home of Bedford Town on 29 April 1973. Southampton won the match 2–0.

== Match details ==
29 April 1973
15:30 BST

Southampton	2–0	Westthorn United
Kenway 70'; Hale 75'	Report

The Eyrie, Bedford
Attendance: 3,000
Referee: J. Parsons

GK	1	(England) Sue Buckett (c)
DF	2	(England) June Finlay
DF	3	(England) Pauline Dickie
DF	4	(Wales) Sylvia Kenway
DF	5	(England) Jill Long
MF	6	(England) Maggie Pearce
MF	7	(England) Lynda Hale
MF	8	(England) Pat Chapman
MF	9	(England) Pat Davies
FW	10	(England) Sue Lopez
FW	11	(England) Beverley Gain
Substitutes:
FW	12	(England) Shirley O' Callaghan
GK	13	(England) Grace Cesareo
Manager:
(England) Mike Harvey

GK	1	(Scotland) Gerry Chalmers
DF	2	(Scotland) Mary Daveport
DF	3	(Scotland) Liz Roselli
DF	4	(Scotland) Sheena McCulloch
DF	5	(Scotland) Elsie Cook
MF	6	(Scotland) Margaret McAulay (c)
MF	7	(Scotland) Rose Reilly
MF	8	(Scotland) Edna Neillis
MF	9	(Scotland) Mary Anderson
FW	10	(Scotland) Marion Mount
FW	11	(Scotland) Kathleen Rush
Substitutes:
FW	12	(Scotland) Dawn Watt
	13	(Scotland) Izzy Cole
Manager:
(Scotland) Bob McAulay
