= 1979 WFA Cup final =

1979 WFA Cup Final
- Event: 1978–79 WFA Cup
Southampton	Lowestoft
1	0
- Date: 6 May 1979
- Venue: Jubilee Park, Waterlooville
- Referee: A. Robinson
- Attendance: 1,200

The 1979 WFA Cup Final was the ninth final of the FA Women's Cup, England's primary cup competition for women's football teams. It was the ninth final to be held under the direct control of Women's Football Association (WFA). Southampton and Lowestoft contested the match at Jubilee Park, the home of Waterlooville F.C. on 6 May 1979. The match ended 1–0 in favour of Southampton.

== Match details ==
6 May 1979
15:00 BST

Southampton	1–0	Lowestoft
Chapman 6'	Report

Jubilee Park, Waterlooville
Attendance: 1,200
Referee: A. Robinson

GK	1	(England) Sue Buckett (c)
DF	2	(England) Heather Kirkland
DF	3	(England) Maggie Pearce
DF	4	(Scotland) Ann Squires
DF	5	(England) Linda Coffin
MF	6	(England) Grace Cesareo
MF	7	(England) Lynda Hale
MF	8	(England) Pat Chapman
MF	9	(England) Sharon Roberts
FW	10	(England) Sue Lopez
FW	11	(England) Hilary Carter
Substitutes:
FW	12	(England) Jackie Richards
DF	13	(England) Jill Long
	14	(England) Andrea Crouch
Manager:
(England) Charlie Clarke

GK	1	(England) Rita Fossey
DF	2	(England) Mary Hinson
DF	3	(England) Anne Leggett
DF	4	(England) Avril Nolloth
DF	5	(England) Kim Blowers
MF	6	(England) Maureen Reynolds (c)
MF	7	(England) Angela Poppy
MF	8	(England) Veronica Price
MF	9	(England) Shirley Jones
FW	10	(England) Linda Curl
FW	11	(England) Julie Bolton	(substituted off) 74'
Substitutes:
	12	(England) Angela Bailey
	13	(England) Jackie Slack	(substituted on) 74'
Manager:
(England) Joe Annis
