= 1975 WFA Cup final =

1975 WFA Cup Final
- Event: 1974–75 WFA Cup
Southampton	Warminster
4	2
- Date: 4 May 1975
- Venue: Brewers Hill, Dunstable
- Referee: A. Coyle

The 1975 WFA Cup Final was the fifth final of the FA Women's Cup, England's primary cup competition for women's football teams. It was the fifth final to be held under the direct control of Women's Football Association (WFA). Southampton Women's F.C. and Warminster L.F.C. contested the match at Brewers Hill, the home of Dunstable Town on 4 May 1975. The match ended 4–2 in favour of Southampton Women.

== Match ==
4 May 1975
15:00 BST

Southampton	4–2	Warminster
Chapman; Dickie; Davies; Hale	Report	Foreman (pen.)

Brewers Hill, Dunstable
Referee: A. Coyle

GK	1	(England) Sue Buckett (c)
DF	2	(England) Beverley Gain
DF	3	(England) Maggie Pearce
DF	4	(Wales) Grace Cesareo
DF	5	(England) Linda Coffin
MF	6	(England) Pauline Dickie
MF	7	(England) Lynda Hale
MF	8	(England) Sue Lopez
MF	9	(England) Pat Davies
FW	10	(England) Kathy Bennett
FW	11	(England) Pat Chapman
Substitutes:
FW	12	(England) Julie Bevis
GK	13	(England) Shirley O'Callaghan
Manager:
(England) Noel Coffin

GK	1	(England) Sue Brown
DF	2	(England) Jane Burton
DF	3	(England) Louise Worth
DF	4	(England) Joanne Greenaway
DF	5	(England) Sandra Phillips (c)
MF	6	(England) Pauline Edwards
MF	7	(England) Julie Costello
MF	8	(England) Julie Doughty
MF	9	(England) Eileen Foreman
FW	10	(England) Sue Jarman
FW	11	(England) Jane Greenaway
Substitutes:
FW	12	(England) Margaret Mead
	13	(England) Evelyn Berry
Manager:
(England) Reg Foreman
