= 1974–75 WFA Cup =

Tournament details
- Country: England & Wales

Final positions
- Champions: Southampton
- Runners-up: Warminster Town
- Penalty shoot-outs do not count towards the total number of goals.

The 1974–75 WFA Cup was an association football knockout tournament for women's teams, held between 6 October 1974 and 4 May 1975. It was the 5th season of the WFA Cup and was won by Southampton, who defeated Warminster Town in the final.

The tournament consisted of seven rounds of competition proper.

All match results and dates from the Women's FA Cup Website.

== Group F ==
=== First round proper ===
All games were scheduled for 6 October 1974.

Tie	Home team (tier)	Score	Away team (tier)	Att.
1	Fishtoft	1–6	Wallsend	
2	Kilnhurst Shooting Stars	9–0	Humberside Wanderers	

=== Second round proper ===
All games were originally scheduled for 3 November 1974.

Tie	Home team (tier)	Score	Away team (tier)	Att.
1	Kilnhurst Shooting Stars	6–1	Ossett	
2	Wallsend	13–0	Taverners Pilgrims	

=== Third round proper ===
All games were originally scheduled for 1 December 1974.

Tie	Home team (tier)	Score	Away team (tier)	Att.
1	Wallsend	3–4	Kilnhurst Shooting Stars	

== First round proper ==
All games were scheduled for 6 October 1974.

Tie	Home team (tier)	Score	Away team (tier)	Att.
1	Brighton & Hove Albion Supporters	?–?	Herne Bay	
2	Brighton G.P.O.	?–?	Gillingham	
3	Chelsea	1–6	Chelles Belles	
4	Cobblers Supporters	0–8	Lowestoft	
5	Courthope	3–3 (a.e.t.)	Dartford College	
replay	Dartford College	?–?	Courthope	
6	Crystal Palace	4–2	Gallaher	
7	Eastville	6–2	Kays	
8	Fodens	11–0	Preston North End	
9	Hellingly (Hailsham)	?–?	Totton	
10	Maidstone	0–12	Southampton	
11	Willesden	2–0	Bellingham	

== Second round proper ==
All games were originally scheduled for 3 November 1974.

Tie	Home team (tier)	Score	Away team (tier)	Att.
1	Doncaster Hammers	10–0	Star Inn	
2	Fodens	18–0	Ashton	
Home team to be confirmed
3	Kirton Groundhogs	?–?	Ashington	
4	Lowestoft	14–0	Irchester Olympians	

== Third round proper ==
All games were originally scheduled for 1 December 1974.

Tie	Home team (tier)	Score	Away team (tier)	Att.
1	Doncaster Hammers	5–3	Ashington	
2	Dunfermline	?–?	Edinburgh Dynamo	
3	Kingston Grasshoppers	2–3	Willesden	
4	Lowestoft	17–1	Murrayside Angels	
5	Luton Daytel	?–?	Town & County	
6	Nottingham Argyle	?–?	Notts Rangers or EMGALS	
7	Prestatyn	1–3	Fodens	

== Regional finals ==
All games were originally scheduled for 29 December 1974 and 5 January 1975.

Tie	Home team (tier)	Score	Away team (tier)	Att.
1	Doncaster Hammers	3–2	Kilnhurst Shooting Stars	
2	Edinburgh Dynamo	3–3 (a.e.t.)	A.E.I. Motherwell	
replay	A.E.I. Motherwell	1–2	Edinburgh Dynamo	
3	Lowestoft	7–0	Luton Daytel	
4	Notts Rangers	2–6	EMGALS	
5	Southampton	8–1	Dartford College	
6	Stoke City	0–8	Fodens	
7	Thame	4–3	Chelles Belles	
8	Warminster Town	5–1	North End (Evesham)	

== Quarter–finals ==
All games were played on 2 February 1975.

Tie	Home team (tier)	Score	Away team (tier)	Att.
1	Doncaster Hammers	1–6	Edinburgh Dynamo	
2	EMGALS	6–5	Fodens	
3	Southampton	4–0	Thame	
4	Warminster Town	7–2	Lowestoft	

== Semi–finals ==
All games were played on 30 March 1975.

Tie	Home team (tier)	Score	Away team (tier)	Att.
1	EMGALS	0–1	Warminster Town	
2	Southampton	1–0	Edinburgh Dynamo	

== Third place playoff ==
All games were played on 4 May 1975.

Tie	Home team (tier)	Score	Away team (tier)	Att.
1	EMGALS	?–?	Edinburgh Dynamo	
Winner not known

== Final ==
4 May 1975
15:00 BST

Southampton	4–2	Warminster Town
Chapman; Dickie; Davies; Hale	Report	Foreman (pen.)

Brewers Hill, Dunstable
Referee: A. Coyle
