= 1971–72 WFA Cup =

Tournament details
- Country: England & Wales

Final positions
- Champions: Southampton
- Runners-up: Lee's
- Penalty shoot-outs do not count towards the total number of goals.

The 1971–72 WFA Cup was an association football knockout tournament for women's teams, held between 10 October 1971 and 7 May 1972. It was the 2nd season of the WFA Cup and was won by Southampton, who defeated Lee's in the final.

The tournament consisted of seven rounds of competition proper.

All match results and dates from the Women's FA Cup Website.

== Group 1 ==
Only known matches shown

=== Teams ===
- Dundee Strikers
- Fife Dynamites
- Hooverettes
- Lee's
- Prima Donnas
- Westthorn United

=== Third round proper ===
All games were originally scheduled for 9 and 23 January and 27 February 1972.

Tie	Home team (tier)	Score	Away team (tier)	Att.
1	Westthorn United	?–?	Hooverettes	

== Group 2 ==
Only known matches shown

=== Teams ===
- Belle Vue Belles
- Blackpool Supporters
- Fodens
- Forest
- Howards Awardians
- Macclesfield
- Manchester Corinthians
- Manchester Nomads
- Plessey
- Preston North End Supporters Club
- Reckitts
- Southport Supporters,

=== First round proper ===
All games were scheduled for 10 October and 7 November 1971.

Tie	Home team (tier)	Score	Away team (tier)	Att.
1	Fodens	11–0	Reckitts	
2	Forest	?–?	Manchester Corinthians	

=== Second round proper ===
All games were originally scheduled for 5 December 1971.

Tie	Home team (tier)	Score	Away team (tier)	Att.
1	Belle Vue Belles	?–?	Plessey	
Winner not known. Home team to be confirmed
2	Blackpool Supporters	0–6	Fodens	

=== Third round proper ===
All games were originally scheduled for 9 and 23 January and 27 February 1972.

Tie	Home team (tier)	Score	Away team (tier)	Att.
1	Fodens	1–0	Belle Vue Belles or Plessey	
2	Forest	1–0	Macclesfield	

== Group 3 ==
=== Teams ===
- Bedworth
- Bedworth Rangers
- Coventry Bantams
- EMGALS
- Hillmorton Hunters
- Lansdowne
- Leicester City Supporters Club
- Nuneaton Rangers
- Rainbow Dazzlers
- Renold
- Rye Piece
- Wanderers (Nuneaton)
- Western Athletic

=== First round proper ===
All games were scheduled for 10 October and 7 November 1971.

Tie	Home team (tier)	Score	Away team (tier)	Att.
1	Coventry Bantams	4–0	Bedworth	
2	EMGALS	16–0	Hillmorton Hunters	
3	Lansdowne	?–?	Leicester City Supporters Club	
4	Nuneaton Rangers	0–2	Bedworth Rangers	
5	Rainbow Dazzlers	?–?	Western Athletic	
6	Wanderers (Nuneaton)	11–0	Rye Piece	
Bye: Renold

=== Second round proper ===
All games were originally scheduled for 5 December 1971.

Tie	Home team (tier)	Score	Away team (tier)	Att.
1	Coventry Bantams	7–0	Renold	
2	EMGALS	4–1	Lansdowne	
Home team to be confirmed
3	Rainbow Dazzlers	1–0	Bedworth Rangers	
Bye: Wanderers (Nuneaton)

=== Third round proper ===
All games were originally scheduled for 9 and 23 January and 27 February 1972.

Tie	Home team (tier)	Score	Away team (tier)	Att.
1	EMGALS	8–0	Rainbow Dazzlers	
2	Wanderers (Nuneaton)	3–0	Coventry Bantams	

== Group 4 ==
Only known matches shown

=== Teams ===
- Aston Villa
- Badsey
- Droitwich St. Andrews
- Dudley Road Hospital
- Kays, Lan-Bar
- Lodge Park
- Norton
- Robirch
- Swan Rangers
- Villa Rangers

=== First round proper ===
All games were scheduled for 10 October and 7 November 1971.

Tie	Home team (tier)	Score	Away team (tier)	Att.
1	Norton	?–?	Kays	

=== Third round proper ===
All games were originally scheduled for 9 and 23 January and 27 February 1972.

Tie	Home team (tier)	Score	Away team (tier)	Att.
1	Kays	?–?	Lodge Park	

== Group 5 ==
Only known matches shown

=== Teams ===
- Barnfield
- Deal Town
- Folkestone United
- Ladybirds (Herne Bay)
- Lydd
- Maidstone Mote United
- Margate Crusaders
- Margate Rangers
- Medway
- Ramsgate All Stars
- Thanet United
- White Wanderers (Hamstreet)

=== First round proper ===
All games were scheduled for 10 October and 7 November 1971.

Tie	Home team (tier)	Score	Away team (tier)	Att.
1	Ladybirds (Herne Bay)	1–0	Margate Rangers	

=== Second round proper ===
All games were originally scheduled for 5 December 1971.

Tie	Home team (tier)	Score	Away team (tier)	Att.
1	Ladybirds (Herne Bay)	1–4	Folkestone United	
2	Medway	2–1	Barnfield	

=== Third round proper ===
All games were originally scheduled for 9 and 23 January and 27 February 1972.

Tie	Home team (tier)	Score	Away team (tier)	Att.
1	Folkestone United	1–2	Deal Town	
2	Medway	0–1	Thanet United	

== Group 6 ==
Matches not known.

=== Teams ===
- Arland
- Barking Belles
- Beechfield
- Blue Birds (Woolpit)
- Boreham Wood Hearts
- Bosom Buddies United
- Farley United (Tigers)
- L'Oreal
- Luton
- Thame
- Willy Walker's Watford Wonders

== Group 7 ==
Only known matches shown

=== Teams ===
- Aristocats United
- Bluebirds
- Brighton G.P.O.
- Courthope
- Crystal Palace
- Crystal Palace 'B'
- Fulham
- Hellingly Hospital S. & S. Club
- Orient
- Queens Park Rangers
- Spurs
- White Ribbon

=== First round proper ===
All games were scheduled for 10 October and 7 November 1971.

Tie	Home team (tier)	Score	Away team (tier)	Att.
1	Brighton G.P.O.	?–? (a.e.t.)	Queens Park Rangers	
replay	Queens Park Rangers	1–0	Brighton G.P.O.	
2	Fulham	2–4	Spurs	
3	Crystal Palace 'B'	5–3	Portslade	

=== Second round proper ===
All games were originally scheduled for 5 December 1971.

Tie	Home team (tier)	Score	Away team (tier)	Att.
1	Crystal Palace 'B'	?–?	Spurs	
2	Orient	2–6	Hellingly Hospital S. & S. Club	
3	Queens Park Rangers	?–?	Aristocats United	
4	White Ribbon	?–?	Crystal Palace	

=== Third round proper ===
All games were originally scheduled for 9 and 23 January and 27 February 1972.

Tie	Home team (tier)	Score	Away team (tier)	Att.
1	Hellingly Hospital S. & S. Club	3–1	Queens Park Rangers	

== Group 8 ==
Only known matches shown

=== Teams ===
- Bracknell Bullets
- Devizes Moonrakers
- Farmborough
- Johnson Rangers
- Newbury Golden Eagles
- Reading
- Southampton
- Southampton 'B'
- Swindon Spitfires

=== Second round proper ===
All games were originally scheduled for 5 December 1971.

Tie	Home team (tier)	Score	Away team (tier)	Att.
1	Bracknell Bullets	10–0	Johnson Rangers	

== Regional finals ==
All games were originally scheduled for 6 and 27 February and 12 March 1972.

Tie	Home team (tier)	Score	Away team (tier)	Att.
1	EMGALS	4–3	Wanderers (Nuneaton)	
2	Forest	0–7	Fodens	
3	Hellingly Hospital S. & S. Club	1–10	Crystal Palace	
4	Kays	0–5	Aston Villa	
5	Westthorn United	3–4	Lee's	
Replay Ordered
replay	Westthorn United	3–5	Lee's	

== Quarter–finals ==
All games were played on 5, 12, 19 and 26 March 1972.

Tie	Home team (tier)	Score	Away team (tier)	Att.
1	Aston Villa	1–5	Southampton	
2	EMGALS	4–1	Crystal Palace	
3	Lee's	?–?	Deal Town	
4	Thame	?–?	Fodens	

== Semi–finals ==
All games were played on 9 April 1972.

Tie	Home team (tier)	Score	Away team (tier)	Att.
1	Lee's	5–2	EMGALS	
2	Thame	3–4	Southampton	

== Third place playoff ==
All games were played on 7 May 1972.

Tie	Home team (tier)	Score	Away team (tier)	Att.
1	Thame	1–1 (1–2 p)	EMGALS	

== Final ==
7 May 1972
15:45 BST

Southampton	3–2	Lee's
Judd; Lopez	Report	White; Ferries

Eton Park, Burton upon Trent
Attendance: 1,500
Referee: W. Tidman (Bedworth)
