= Heather Kirkland =

English footballer

Personal information
- Place of birth: Southampton, England
- Position: Defender

Senior career*
| Years | Team | Apps | (Gls) |
| 1971-1984 | Southampton Women's F.C. | | |
- * Club domestic league appearances and goals

Heather Kirkland is a former professional football player who played for Southampton. She won four Women's FA Cups with Southampton during the 1970s. After retiring from football, Kirkland participated in football coaching especially in walking football. Kirkland has a sister, Morag Pearce, who also played for Southampton and won four WFA Cups between 1976 and 1981.

== Honours ==
- WFA Cup (Women's FA Cup)
  - Winners: (4) 1975–76 WFA Cup, 1977–78 WFA Cup, 1978–79 WFA Cup, 1980–81 WFA Cup
