= 1982 WFA Cup final =

1982 WFA Cup Final
- Event: 1981–82 WFA Cup
| Lowestoft | Cleveland Spartans |
| 2 | 0 |
- Date: 1 May 1982
- Venue: Loftus Road, London
- Referee: D.S. Vickers (Ilford)
- Attendance: 1,000

The 1982 WFA Cup Final was the 12th final of the FA Women's Cup, England's primary cup competition for women's football teams. The showpiece event was played under the auspices of the Women's Football Association (WFA). Lowestoft and Cleveland Spartans contested the match at Loftus Road in London on 1 May 1982. Lowestoft won 2–0.

== Match details ==
1 May 1982
12:30 BST

| Lowestoft | 2–0 | Cleveland Spartans |
|---|---|---|
| Curl 26'; Poppy 57' | Report |

Loftus Road, London
Attendance: 1,000
Referee: D.S. Vickers (Ilford)

| GK | 1 | (England) Rita Fossey |
| DF | 2 | (England) Mary Hinson |
| DF | 3 | (England) Jackie Slack (c) |
| DF | 4 | (England) Vicky Johnson | Substituted off |
| DF | 5 | (England) Sallie Jackson |
| MF | 6 | (England) Kim Blowers |
| MF | 7 | (England) Angela Poppy |
| MF | 8 | (England) Hannah Davidson |
| MF | 9 | (England) Shirley Jones | Substituted off |
| FW | 10 | (England) Linda Curl |
| FW | 11 | (England) Julie Bolton |
Substitutes:
| | 12 | (England) Avril Nolloth | Substituted on |
| DF | 13 | (England) Kate Purdom | Substituted on |
Manager:
(England) Stewart Reynolds

| GK | 1 | (England) Janice Elliot |
| DF | 2 | (England) Pamela Williams |
| DF | 3 | (England) Anna Citro |
| DF | 4 | (England) Marrie Wieczorek |
| DF | 5 | (England) Denise Markham |
| MF | 6 | (England) Anne Duffy (c) |
| MF | 7 | (England) Jane Laugher | Substituted off |
| MF | 8 | (England) Margaret Anderson |
| MF | 9 | (England) Jane Hughes |
| FW | 10 | (England) Teresa Murphy |
| FW | 11 | (England) Julie Tomlinson |
Substitutes:
| FW | 12 | (England) Julie Hogan |
| DF | 13 | (England) Carol Wickham | Substituted on |
Manager:
(England) Janet Turner
