= Angela Poppy =

English footballer

Personal information
- Date of birth: 19 November 1953 (age 72)

Senior career*
Years	Team	Apps	(Gls)
- Lowestoft Ladies F.C.

International career
1976‍–‍1980	England	5	(1)
- * Club domestic league appearances and goals

Angela Poppy (born 19 November 1953) is a former England women's international footballer and Women's FA Cup winner.

== Club career ==
Poppy's greatest achievement in her club career was scoring the winning goal in the 1982 Women's FA Cup final with Lowestoft Ladies F.C. against Cleveland Spartans. Poppy, who worked as an accounts clerk, struck a powerful shot into the top corner of the goal to make the score 2‍–‍0. They maintained their lead to win the final 2‍–‍0 at Loftus Road. It was second time lucky for Poppy after she was part of the Lowestoft Ladies side that lost the 1979 WFA Cup final to Southampton WFC at Jubilee Park, Waterlooville.

== International career ==
Poppy's England debut came on 22 May 1976 in a 4‍–‍0 win against Wales, when she was aged 22. Poppy scored a goal after coming on as a substitute. She won five England caps in total. In November 2022, Poppy was recognized by The Football Association as one of the England national team's legacy players, and as the 31st women's player to be capped by England.

== Personal life ==
Her son Carl Poppy played for Lowestoft Town F.C. in the 2008 FA Vase final.

== Honours ==
Lowestoft Ladies F.C.

- FA Women's Cup: 1982
