= 1975–76 WFA Cup =

Tournament details
- Country: England & Wales

Final positions
- Champions: Southampton
- Runners-up: Queen's Park Rangers
- Penalty shoot-outs do not count towards the total number of goals.

The 1975–76 WFA Cup was an association football knockout tournament for women's teams, held between 5 October 1975 and 25 April 1976. It was the 6th season of the WFA Cup and was won by Southampton, who defeated Queen's Park Rangers in the final.

The tournament consisted of seven rounds of competition proper.

All match results and dates from the Women's FA Cup Website.

== Group 1 ==
=== First round proper ===
All games were scheduled for 5 October 1975.

Tie	Home team (tier)	Score	Away team (tier)	Att.
1	Chester	0–12	Halton	
2	Hull Brewery	0–4	Preston North End Supporters Club	

=== Second round proper ===
All games were originally scheduled for 2 November 1975.

Tie	Home team (tier)	Score	Away team (tier)	Att.
1	Ashton	1–2	Macclesfield	
2	Belle Vue Belles	3–2	Fodens	
3	Halton	5–1	Taverners Pilgrims	
4	Kilnhurst Shooting Stars	7–0	Bronte	
5	Preston Dolphins	2–6	Prestatyn	
6	Preston North End Supporters Club	5–0	Star Inn	
7	Southport	3–0	Reckitts	
8	Wallsend	H–W	Ashington	
Walkover for Wallsend

=== Third round proper ===
All games were originally scheduled for 7 December 1975.

Tie	Home team (tier)	Score	Away team (tier)	Att.
1	Belle Vue Belles	2–2 (a.e.t.)	Macclesfield	
replay	Macclesfield	?–?	Belle Vue Belles	
2	Halton	2–3	Southport	
3	Prestatyn	3–3 (a.e.t.)	Kilnhurst Shooting Stars	
replay	Kilnhurst Shooting Stars	?–?	Prestatyn	
4	Wallsend	0–5	Preston North End Supporters Club	

=== Fourth round proper ===
All games were originally scheduled for 4 and 11 January 1976.

Tie	Home team (tier)	Score	Away team (tier)	Att.
1	Preston North End Supporters Club	2–1	Kilnhurst Shooting Stars	
2	Belle Vue Belles	?–?	Southport	
Home team to be confirmed

== Group 2 ==
=== First round proper ===
All games were scheduled for 5 October 1975.

Tie	Home team (tier)	Score	Away team (tier)	Att.
1	Maidstone	1–0	Orpington	
2	Marmion Centre	2–2 (a.e.t.)	Dartford College	
replay	Dartford College	10–0	Marmion Centre	

=== Second round proper ===
All games were originally scheduled for 2 November 1975.

Tie	Home team (tier)	Score	Away team (tier)	Att.
1	Century	O–W	Dartford College	
2	Courthope	1–3	Shoreham	
3	Maidstone	4–2	Kingston Grasshoppers	
4	Millwall Lionesses	2–13	Ashford Town	
5	Prism	1–2	Teynham	
6	Thanet Bluebirds	2–1	Herne Bay	
7	Waterlooville	0–3	Brighton & Hove Albion Supporters	
8	Yellow Star	2–0	C&C Sports	

=== Third round proper ===
All games were originally scheduled for 7 December 1975.

Tie	Home team (tier)	Score	Away team (tier)	Att.
1	Ashford Town	3–0	Yellow Star	
2	Brighton & Hove Albion Supporters	11–1	Teynham	
3	Maidstone	5–1	Shoreham	
4	Thanet Bluebirds	H–W	Dartford College	
Walkover for Thanet Bluebirds

=== Fourth round proper ===
All games were originally scheduled for 4 and 11 January 1976.

Tie	Home team (tier)	Score	Away team (tier)	Att.
1	Ashford Town	2–1	Maidstone	
2	Thanet Bluebirds	1–8	Brighton & Hove Albion Supporters	

== Group 3 ==
=== First round proper ===
All games were scheduled for 5 October 1975.

Tie	Home team (tier)	Score	Away team (tier)	Att.
1	Amersham Angels	4–0	Cobblers Supporters	
2	Aylesbury Harlequins	1–4	Watford	
3	Bedford Catarans	2–0	Pye	
4	Bedworth United	9–3	Beccles	
5	Carr Fastener	6–0	Wealdstone	
6	Dunstable	0–11	Suffolk Bluebirds	
7	EMGALS	4–1	Chelsea	
8	Gallaher	0–12	Town & County	
9	Holbrooks Athletic	7–1	Bruce Park	
10	Leicester	3–0	Luton	
11	Luton Daytel	H–W	Thurrock	
12	Notts Rangers	6–5	Lowestoft	
13	Spurs	0–7	Queen's Park Rangers	
14	Stevenage	1–1 (a.e.t.)	Fulham	
replay	Fulham	2–1	Stevenage	
15	Thame	7–0	Willesden	
Bye: Birmingham City

=== Second round proper ===
All games were originally scheduled for 2 November 1975.

Tie	Home team (tier)	Score	Away team (tier)	Att.
1	Amersham Angels	0–4	EMGALS	
2	Bedford Catarans	0–9	Thame	
3	Bedworth United	5–5 (a.e.t.)	Luton Daytel	
replay	Luton Daytel	?–?	Bedworth United	
4	Fulham	2–3	Leicester	
5	Holbrooks Athletic	0–7	Carr Fastener	
6	Queen's Park Rangers	6–0	Birmingham City	
7	Town & County	1–3	Notts Rangers	
8	Watford	1–0	Suffolk Bluebirds	

=== Third round proper ===
All games were originally scheduled for 7 December 1975.

Tie	Home team (tier)	Score	Away team (tier)	Att.
1	Luton Daytel	5–1	Leicester	
2	Queen's Park Rangers	4–2	Notts Rangers	
3	Thame	2–3	Carr Fastener	
4	Watford	2–1	EMGALS	

=== Fourth round proper ===
All games were originally scheduled for 4 and 11 January 1976.

Tie	Home team (tier)	Score	Away team (tier)	Att.
1	Carr Fastener	1–8	Queen's Park Rangers	
2	Watford	?–?	Luton Daytel	
Home team to be confirmed

== Group 4 ==
=== First round proper ===
All games were scheduled for 5 October 1975.

Tie	Home team (tier)	Score	Away team (tier)	Att.
1	Chard	7–1	Looe	
2	Devizes	0–2	Warminster	
3	Swaythling	3–2	Bath	

=== Second round proper ===
All games were originally scheduled for 2 November 1975.

Tie	Home team (tier)	Score	Away team (tier)	Att.
1	Brislington	3–1	Chard	
2	Bristol Bluebirds	1–8	Bracknell Bullets	
3	Cope Chat	5–0	Totton	
4	Droitwich	0–4	Southampton	
5	Kays	5–4	Swaythling	
6	Newport	3–2	Bracknell	
7	Warminster	13–0	Evesham	
8	Worcester	0–6	Swindon Spitfires	

=== Third round proper ===
All games were originally scheduled for 7 December 1975.

Tie	Home team (tier)	Score	Away team (tier)	Att.
1	Brislington	6–3	Bracknell Bullets	
2	Cope Chat	5–1	Swindon Spitfires	
3	Newport	1–1 (a.e.t.)	Kays	
replay	Kays	?–?	Newport	
4	Southampton	2–0	Warminster	

=== Fourth round proper ===
All games were originally scheduled for 4 and 11 January 1976.

Tie	Home team (tier)	Score	Away team (tier)	Att.
1	Brislington	?–? (a.e.t.)	Kays	
replay	Kays	8–0	Brislington	
2	Southampton	2–1	Cope Chat	

== Quarter–finals ==
All games were played on 1 February 1976.

Tie	Home team (tier)	Score	Away team (tier)	Att.
1	Belle Vue Belles	3–2	Preston North End Supporters Club	
2	Brighton & Hove Albion Supporters	6–1	Ashford Town	
3	Kays	2–4	Southampton	
4	Watford	0–4	Queens Park Rangers	

== Semi–finals ==
All games were played on 4 April 1976.

Tie	Home team (tier)	Score	Away team (tier)	Att.
1	Belle Vue Belles	0–1	Queens Park Rangers	
2	Brighton & Hove Albion Supporters	1–8	Southampton	

== Third place playoff ==
All games were played on 25 April 1976.

Tie	Home team (tier)	Score	Away team (tier)	Att.
1	Belle Vue Belles	0–6	Brighton & Hove Albion Supporters	

== Final ==
25 April 1976
14:30 BST

Southampton	2–1 (a.e.t.)	Queen's Park Rangers
M. Kirkland; Davies	Report	McGroarty

The Eyrie, Bedford
Attendance: 1,500
Referee: John Hunting
