= 1972–73 WFA Cup =

Tournament details
- Country: England & Wales

Final positions
- Champions: Southampton
- Runners-up: Westthorn United
- Penalty shoot-outs do not count towards the total number of goals.

The 1972–73 WFA Cup was an association football knockout tournament for women's teams, held between 5 November 1972 and 29 April 1973. It was the 3rd season of the WFA Cup and was won by Southampton, who defeated Westthorn United in the final.

The tournament consisted of seven rounds of competition proper.

All match results and dates from the Women's FA Cup Website.

== Group 1 ==
Only known matches shown

=== Teams ===
- A.E.I. Motherwell
- Arbroath Rangers
- Dundee Strikers
- Fife Dynamites
- Lee's
- Westthorn United

=== First round proper ===
All games were scheduled for 5 and 19 November 1972.

Tie	Home team (tier)	Score	Away team (tier)	Att.
1	A.E.I. Motherwell	?–?	Westthorn United	
2	Arbroath Rangers	2–2 (a.e.t.)	Fife Dynamites	
replay	Fife Dynamites	3–0	Arbroath Rangers	

== Group 2 ==
Only known matches shown

=== Teams ===
- Ashton
- Blackpool Seabirds
- Bronte
- E.R.F. Sandbach
- Fleece Fillies
- Lancaster
- Liverpool
- Liverton
- Manchester Corinthians
- Plessey
- Preston Dolphins
- Preston North End Supporters Club
- Reckitts, Southport
- Squibb
- Wallsend

=== First round proper ===
All games were scheduled for 5 and 19 November 1972.

Tie	Home team (tier)	Score	Away team (tier)	Att.
1	E.R.F. Sandbach	5–6	Wallsend	
2	Liverpool	?–?	Preston North End Supporters Club	

=== Second round proper ===
All games were originally scheduled for 3 and 17 December 1972.

Tie	Home team (tier)	Score	Away team (tier)	Att.
1	Liverpool	?–?	Wallsend	

== Group 3 ==
Only known matches shown

=== Teams ===
- Bedworth Rangers
- City Angels
- County Canaries
- EMGALS
- Fodens
- Forest
- Forest Rangers
- Leicester City Supporters Club
- Macclesfield
- Old Bank
- Rainbow Dazzlers
- Wanderers (Nuneaton)

=== First round proper ===
All games were scheduled for 5 and 19 November 1972.

Tie	Home team (tier)	Score	Away team (tier)	Att.
1	Bedworth Rangers	1–6	Wanderers (Nuneaton)	
2	Fodens	?–?	Old Bank	
3	Macclesfield	6–2	City Angels	
4	Rainbow Dazzlers	5–1	Forest Rangers	

=== Second round proper ===
All games were originally scheduled for 3 and 17 December 1972.

Tie	Home team (tier)	Score	Away team (tier)	Att.
1	Fodens	?–?	Forest	
2	Wanderers (Nuneaton)	2–0	Leicester City Supporters Club	

=== Third round proper ===
All games were originally scheduled for 7 January 1973.

Tie	Home team (tier)	Score	Away team (tier)	Att.
1	EMGALS	5–0	County Canaries	
2	Fodens	4–0	Wanderers (Nuneaton)	

== Group 4 ==
Only known matches shown

=== Teams ===
- Aston Villa
- Bedworth
- Birmingham City
- Coventry Bantams
- Cox & Wyman
- L'Oreal
- Lodge Park
- Lowestoft
- Pye
- Villa Rangers
- Watney Mann
- Woodbridge American,

=== First round proper ===
All games were scheduled for 5 and 19 November 1972.

Tie	Home team (tier)	Score	Away team (tier)	Att.
1	Coventry Bantams	12–0	Lodge Park	
2	Lowestoft	8–5	Warminster	

=== Second round proper ===
All games were originally scheduled for 3 and 17 December 1972.

Tie	Home team (tier)	Score	Away team (tier)	Att.
1	Coventry Bantams	6–1	Aston Villa	
2	Pye	1–2	Lowestoft	
3	Watney Mann	?–?	Birmingham City	

=== Third round proper ===
All games were originally scheduled for 7 January 1973.

Tie	Home team (tier)	Score	Away team (tier)	Att.
1	Birmingham City	3–0	Coventry Bantams	
2	L'Oreal	0–10	Lowestoft	

== Group 5 ==
Only known matches shown

=== Teams ===
- Ashford Town
- Barnfield
- Deal Town
- Herne Bay Ladybirds
- Maidstone Mote United
- Margate Rangers
- Travaux
- White Wanderers (Hamstreet)

=== First round proper ===
All games were scheduled for 5 and 19 November 1972.

Tie	Home team (tier)	Score	Away team (tier)	Att.
1	Travaux	5–1	Margate Rangers	

=== Second round proper ===
All games were originally scheduled for 3 and 17 December 1972.

Tie	Home team (tier)	Score	Away team (tier)	Att.
1	Ashford Town	?–?	Travaux	

== Group 6 ==
Only known matches shown

=== Teams ===
- Amersham Angels
- Arland
- Aylesbury
- Chelles Belles
- Farley United (Tigers)
- Luton Daytel
- Reading
- Thame

=== First round proper ===
All games were scheduled for 5 and 19 November 1972.

Tie	Home team (tier)	Score	Away team (tier)	Att.
1	Amersham Angels	20–0	Chelles Belles	

=== Second round proper ===
All games were originally scheduled for 3 and 17 December 1972.

Tie	Home team (tier)	Score	Away team (tier)	Att.
1	Thame	3–5	Amersham Angels	

== Group 7 ==
Only known matches shown

=== Teams ===
- Bosom Buddies United
- Brighton G.P.O.
- Chelsea
- Crystal Palace
- Fulham
- Hellingly (Hailsham)
- Mackeson Maids
- Queens Park Rangers
- Thanet Bluebirds
- Wood Street

=== First round proper ===
All games were scheduled for 5 and 19 November 1972.

Tie	Home team (tier)	Score	Away team (tier)	Att.
1	Fulham	5–3	Bosom Buddies United	

=== Second round proper ===
All games were originally scheduled for 3 and 17 December 1972.

Tie	Home team (tier)	Score	Away team (tier)	Att.
1	Brighton G.P.O.	1–5	Queens Park Rangers	
2	Fulham	0–9	Crystal Palace	
3	Hellingly (Hailsham)	1–0	Mackeson Maids	

== Group 8 ==
Only known matches shown

=== Teams ===
- Bath City
- Bracknell Bullets
- Bristol
- Compton Wanderers
- Devizes Moonrakers
- Eastville
- Farmborough
- Harlequins
- Horrocks Fashions
- J.R. Freemans
- Johnson Rangers
- Kays
- Prestatyn
- Southampton
- Swindon Spitfires
- Tottonians

=== First round proper ===
All games were scheduled for 5 and 19 November 1972.

Tie	Home team (tier)	Score	Away team (tier)	Att.
1	Bath City	4–5 (a.e.t.)	Bracknell Bullets	
2	J.R. Freemans	?–?	Harlequins	
3	Johnson Rangers	7–0	Horrocks Fashions	
4	Prestatyn	10–1	Kays	

=== Second round proper ===
All games were originally scheduled for 3 and 17 December 1972.

Tie	Home team (tier)	Score	Away team (tier)	Att.
1	Compton Wanderers	?–?	Bracknell	
2	J.R. Freemans	1–5	Johnson Rangers	

=== Third round proper ===
All games were originally scheduled for 7 January 1973.

Tie	Home team (tier)	Score	Away team (tier)	Att.
1	Johnson Rangers	0–7	Southampton	
2	Swindon Spitfires	1–4	Compton Wanderers	

== Regional finals ==
All games were originally scheduled for 7 January and 4 and February 1973.

Tie	Home team (tier)	Score	Away team (tier)	Att.
1	Amersham Angels	8–0	Reading	
2	Ashford Town	?–?	Deal Town	
3	Birmingham City	4–2	Lowestoft	
4	Fleece Fillies	?–?	Preston North End Supporters Club	
5	Fodens	?–?	EMGALS	
6	Hellingly (Hailsham)	3–1	Wood Street	
7	Southampton	?–?	Compton Wanderers	
8	Westthorn United	?–?	Lee's	

== Quarter–finals ==
All games were played on 4 March 1973.

Tie	Home team (tier)	Score	Away team (tier)	Att.
1	Amersham Angels	7–0	Hellingly (Hailsham)	
2	Ashford Town	0–1	Birmingham City	
3	Southampton	3–0	Preston North End Supporters Club	
4	Westthorn United	7–0	Fodens	

== Semi–finals ==
All games were played on 1 April 1973.

Tie	Home team (tier)	Score	Away team (tier)	Att.
1	Amersham Angels	0–2	Westthorn United	
2	Southampton	7–0	Birmingham City	

== Third place playoff ==
All games were played on 29 April 1973.

Tie	Home team (tier)	Score	Away team (tier)	Att.
1	Amersham Angels	1–0	Birmingham City	

== Final ==
29 April 1973
15:30 BST

Southampton	2–0	Westthorn United
Kenway 70'; Hale 75'	Report

The Eyrie, Bedford
Attendance: 3,000
Referee: J. Parsons
