= 1977–78 WFA Cup =

- Final programme

Tournament details
- Country: England
- Dates: 1977 – April 1978

Final positions
- Champions: Southampton
- Runners-up: Queen's Park Rangers

The 1977–78 Women's Football Association Cup was the eighth edition of the WFA Cup (Women's FA Cup), the national women's football knockout competition in England. It was organised by the Women's Football Association (WFA) and was named The Pony WFA Cup for sponsorship reasons.

Queen's Park Rangers went into the season as the Cup's holders. They won their quarter–final against Warminster Wanderers, 4–1 at Eastcote.

In a semi–final in April, Southampton played against St Helens at Bedworth Oval.

The 1978 Final was won by Southampton against Queen's Park Rangers, the defending champions. The match, which ended in an 8–2 scoreline, set several scoring records for the WFA Cup/Women's FA Cup Final that still stand today: the highest total number of goals in a match; the highest margin of victory for any Cup–winner; and the most Final goals by one player, Pat Chapman, who scored six. The game was played at Slough Town F.C.

The 1978 Cup was Southampton sixth title. After the final, the winning team were featured in a news report on Southern Television.

All match results and dates from the Women's FA Cup Website.

== First round ==
All games were scheduled for 2 October 1977.

Tie	Home team (tier)	Score	Away team (tier)	Att.
1	Lowestoft	6–2	Luton Daytel	

== Second round ==
All games were originally scheduled for 2 October 1977.

Tie	Home team (tier)	Score	Away team (tier)	Att.
1	Ashford Wanderers	0–15	Kensure	
2	Ashton	2–1	Metal Box	
3	Aycliffe Echoes	0–10	Wallsend	
4	Aylesbury Harlequins	4–2	Watford	
5	Bedworth United	24–1	Woolworth Elite	
6	Bellington United	0–12	Willesden	
7	Birmingham City	8–0	Bromyard	
8	Bracknell	3–3 (a.e.t.)	Newbury	
replay	Newbury	?–?	Bracknell	
9	Bracknell Bullets	H–W	Avon County Rangers	
Walkover for Bracknell Bullets
10	Bronte	1–5	Kilnhurst Shooting Stars	
11	BYC Argyle (Burwell Youth Club)	H–W	Launton	
Walkover for BYC Argyle (Burwell Youth Club)
12	C&C Sports	5–4	Herne Bay	
13	Chard	H–W	Callington	
Walkover for Chard
14	Chelsea Supporters	0–8	Wealdstone	
15	Chester	3–2	Thornton ICI	
16	Compton	A–W	Southampton	
Walkover for Southampton
17	Cope Chat	4–2	Totton	
18	Copenacre	1–3	Swindon Spitfires	
19	Costessey	4–1	Luton	
20	Coventry City Supporters	H–W	Newtown	
Walkover for Coventry City Supporters
21	Dartford College	10–0	Gillingham	
22	Dobwalls	7–1	Cranford	
23	East Avon Athletic	7–0	Dursley Town	
24	East Herts College	0–11	Queens Park Rangers	
25	Fodens	4–0	Rotherham	
26	Hull Brewery	12–1	Reckitts	
27	Kays	3–2	Coventry Bantams	
28	Ladybirds	1–13	Notts Rangers	
29	Launceston	0–16	Tiverton Town	
30	Leaside	0–18	St Helens	
31	Leicester	3–0	Droitwich St. Andrews	
32	Lowestoft	H–W	Bedford Catarans	
Walkover for Lowestoft
33	Macclesfield	11–0	Rossendale	
34	Maidstone	6–2	Ashford Town	
35	Marmion Centre	8–0	Prism	
36	Nat West Exeter	2–7	Tivvy Motel	
37	Newport	8–2	Llanedeyrn	
38	Papworth Pendragons	6–4	Dunstable	
39	Plymouth Pilgrims	5–3	Exeter	
40	Prestatyn	H–W	Newtown Sports Club	
Walkover for Prestatyn
41	Preston North End	14–0	BAC Warton	
42	Preston Rangers	6–1	Broadoak	
43	Rowntrees	0–14	Cleveland Spartans	
44	Sharp Fisher	0–19	Chippenham Moonrakers	
45	Southend	0–0 (a.e.t.)	Millwall Lionesses	
replay	Millwall Lionesses	5–1	Southend	
46	Spurs	6–1	Gallaher	
47	Stevenage Athletic	2–7	Suffolk Bluebirds	
48	Sunderland	0–8	Doncaster Belles	
49	Thanet Bluebirds	4–3	Teynham Strykers	
50	Thurrock	2–1	Friends of Fulham	
51	Top Rank (Bristol)	1–10	Bristol Bluebirds	
52	Torbay United	7–1	Pelynt–Polperro	
53	Town & County	1–2	Solihull	
54	Uttoxeter Eagles	0–7	EMGALS	
55	Waterlooville	2–3	Warminster Wanderers	
56	West Ham United	0–1	Amersham Angels	
57	Wolverhampton Wednesbury Tube	9–0	Tildawn	

== Third round ==
All games were originally scheduled for 6 November 1977.

Tie	Home team (tier)	Score	Away team (tier)	Att.
1	Amersham Angels	2–3	Chelsea	
2	Aylesbury Harlequins	9–0	Colchester Swifts	
3	Bracknell Bullets	2–3	East Avon Athletic	
4	Chard	4–4 (a.e.t.)	Torbay United	
replay	Torbay United	4–0	Chard	
5	Cleveland Spartans	2–5	Doncaster Belles	
6	Coventry City Supporters	1–4	Wolverhampton Wednesbury Tube	
7	Dobwalls	13–2	Tivvy Motel	
8	EMGALS	4–2	Kays	
9	Fodens	2–4	Preston Rangers	
10	Kilnhurst Shooting Stars	4–0	Chester	
11	Leicester	2–4	Birmingham City	
12	Lowestoft	10–0	Costessey	
13	Maidstone	2–2 (a.e.t.)	C&C Sports	
replay	C&C Sports	0–2	Maidstone	
14	Millwall Lionesses	2–1	Fulham	
15	Newbury	1–3	Warminster Wanderers	
16	Newport	7–1	Bristol Bluebirds	
17	Notts Rangers	8–0	Bedworth United	
18	Papworth Pendragons	0–4	Suffolk Bluebirds	
19	Prestatyn	7–0	Nabwood Athletic	
20	Preston North End	5–0	Ashton	
21	Queens Park Rangers	6–0	Kensure	
22	Shoreham	1–2	Marmion Centre	
23	Shoreline	1–4	Spurs	
24	Solihull	2–0	BYC Argyle (Burwell Youth Club)	
25	Southampton	12–0	Cope Chat	
26	St Helens	6–0	Macclesfield	
27	Swindon Spitfires	0–0 (a.e.t.)	Chippenham Moonrakers	
replay	Chippenham Moonrakers	5–4	Swindon Spitfires	
28	Thanet Bluebirds	0–7	Dartford College	
29	Tiverton Town	1–4	Plymouth Pilgrims	
30	Wallsend	3–1	Hull Brewery	
31	Wealdstone	4–0	Thurrock	
32	Willesden	4–0	Romford	

== Fourth round ==
All games were originally scheduled for 4 December 1977 and 8 January 1978.

Tie	Home team (tier)	Score	Away team (tier)	Att.
1	Birmingham City	1–3	Kilnhurst Shooting Stars	
2	Chippenham Moonrakers	2–3	Preston North End	
3	Dartford College	1–1 (a.e.t.)	Suffolk Bluebirds	
replay	Suffolk Bluebirds	0–4	Dartford College	
4	Dobwalls	0–6	Notts Rangers	
5	Doncaster Belles	4–0	Spurs	
6	East Avon Athletic	0–7	Aylesbury Harlequins	
7	Lowestoft	5–1	Millwall Lionesses	
8	Maidstone	1–9	Southampton	
9	Marmion Centre	1–3	Wolverhampton Wednesbury Tube	
10	Plymouth Pilgrims	1–2	Chelsea	
11	Prestatyn	0–2	St Helens	
12	Queens Park Rangers	9–1	Newport	
13	Wallsend	1–3	Preston Rangers	
14	Warminster Wanderers	4–1	Torbay United	
15	Wealdstone	0–8	Solihull	
16	Willesden	4–2	EMGALS	

== Fifth round ==
All games were played on 5 and 12 February 1978.

Tie	Home team (tier)	Score	Away team (tier)	Att.
1	Chelsea	2–1	Preston North End	
2	Dartford College	2–0	Wolverhampton Wednesbury Tube	
3	Kilnhurst Shooting Stars	1–3	Southampton	
4	Lowestoft	1–2	Queens Park Rangers	
5	Notts Rangers	?–?	Aylesbury Harlequins	
6	Preston Rangers	2–3	Willesden	
7	Solihull	?–?	St Helens	
8	Warminster Wanderers	3–2	Doncaster Belles	

== Sixth round ==
All games were played on 5 and 12 March 1978.

Tie	Home team (tier)	Score	Away team (tier)	Att.
1	Chelsea	0–7	Southampton	
2	Dartford College	0–8	St Helens	
3	Queens Park Rangers	4–1	Warminster Wanderers	
4	Willesden	2–0	Aylesbury Harlequins	

== Semi–finals ==
All games were played on 2 April 1978.

Tie	Home team (tier)	Score	Away team (tier)	Att.
1	Queens Park Rangers	2–0	Willesden	
2	St Helens	1–3	Southampton	

== Final ==
30 April 1978
15:00 BST

Southampton	8–2	Queen's Park Rangers
Davies; Lopez; Chapman	Report	Choat; Staley

Wexham Park Stadium, Slough
Attendance: 200
Referee: Clive White

== See also ==
- Women's FA Cup
- Women's World Invitational Tournament
- 1977–78 FA Cup
