= Arthur Hobbs (WFA) =

British football administrator

Arthur Henry Hobbs (c. 1923 – 1975) was a British football administrator who has been described as the 'father of women's football' in the United Kingdom. He ran the successful Deal International Tournament and was later instrumental in starting the Women's Football Association, serving as its first secretary in 1969.

== Early life and career ==
Hobbs was born in c. 1923 in Wincanton, in Somerset. He was a carpenter and played amateur football. During the Second World War he served in the 4th Battalion, Wiltshire Regiment and was stationed in Deal, in Kent, where he settled after the war and he and his older brother, Albert, married twin sisters, Mary and Daphne Arnold. He worked for Deal Town Council as a carpenter.

Enthusiastic about women's football, Hobbs ran a team in Deal and in 1965 held a match for telephone operators. In 1967 he organised an 8-team local tournament to be held at Deal Town F.C.'s ground; it had to be moved to Betteshanger Colliery after the FA blocked use of the ground under their 1921 ban on women's football. Dover GPO were the winners. The following year, teams from the North of England participated, and Manchester Corinthians won; the Deal International Tournament grew to 52 teams in 1969.

In the late 1960s he took a leading role in starting the Ladies' Football Association of Great Britain, now the Women's Football Association, which he announced after the 1969 Deal Tournament; he was its first secretary when it held its first meeting that November. He stepped down for health reasons in 1972, the year of the last Deal Tournament.

== Legacy ==
An Arthur Hobbs Cup was planned to be held in 2022 under the auspices of Deal Town F.C. and Betteshanger Sports & Social Club with the support of Deal Town Council, as a revival of the Deal International Tournament in honour of Hobbs. In 2023, the first Arthur Henry Hobbs tournament for under-16 girls' teams took place at Goodwin Academy in Deal, in association with the Deal Town Rangers Summer Tournament.

== Personal life ==
Hobbs and his wife Mary adopted a son and a daughter. His wife was killed in a car accident in the early 1970s; he died of a heart attack in 1975.
