= Sue Lopez =

English footballer

Sue Lopez MBE
Personal information
- Date of birth: 1 September 1945 (age 81)
- Place of birth: Southampton, England
- Positions: Left winger; forward

Youth career
- Royex

Senior career*
Years	Team	Apps	(Gls)
1966–1971	Southampton W.F.C.		
1971	Roma CF		
1971–1985	Southampton W.F.C.		

International career
1973–1979	England	22	(6)

Managerial career
- 1995–1996: Wales
- 2003–2005: Southampton Saints
- * Club domestic league appearances and goals as of 11:26, 18 February 2012 (UTC)

Susan Melody Lopez MBE (born 1 September 1945) is an English former footballer who played as a left winger. She spent her entire club career with Southampton, except for a season in Italy's Serie A with Roma CF in 1971. A leading advocate of the women's game in England, Lopez has also worked as a coach, administrator and writer since her retirement from playing.

== Playing career ==
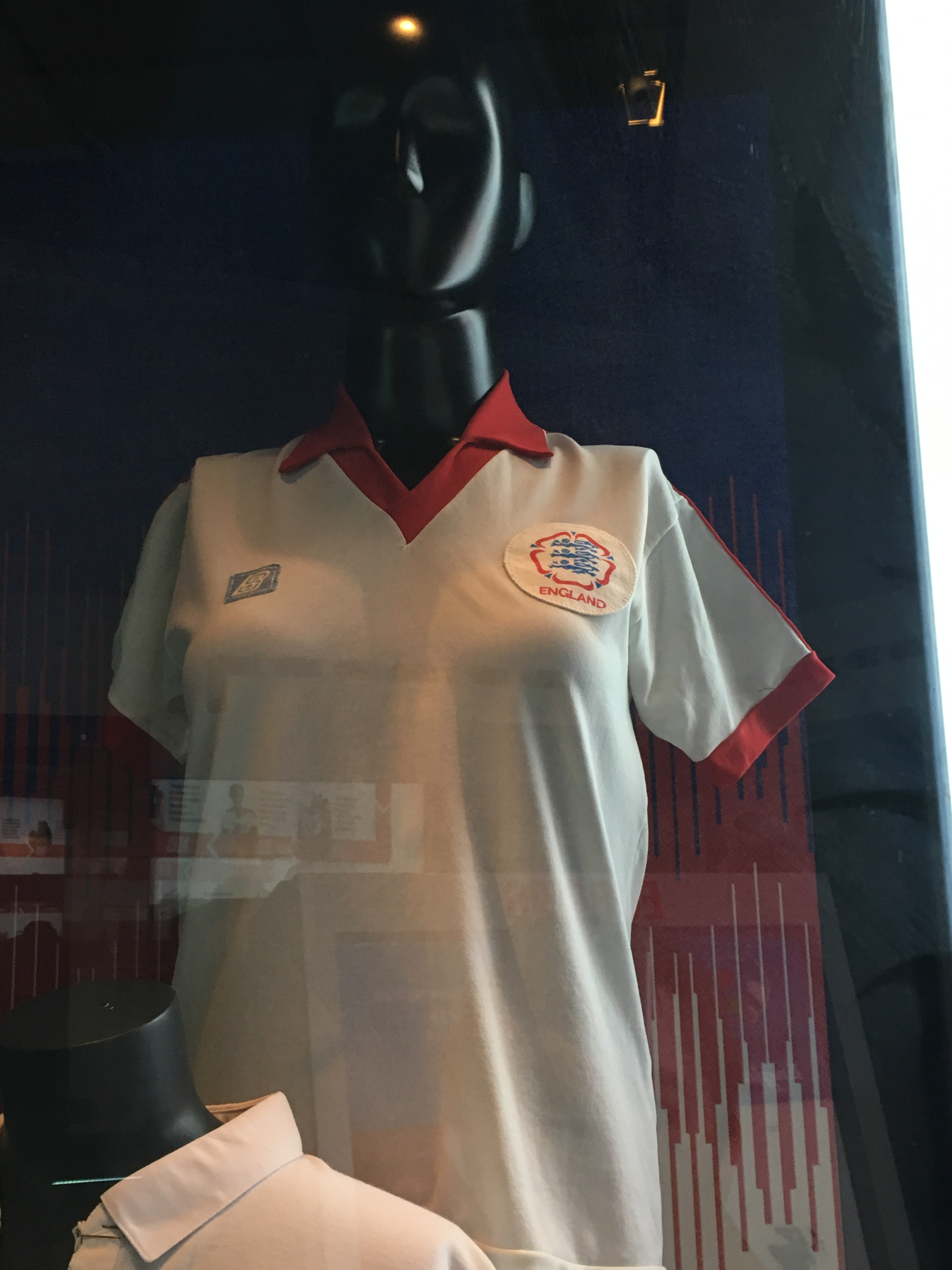
Lopez' 1970s England shirt

At the age of 21, in 1966, Lopez made her debut for Southampton. She was a regular in the side for almost twenty years until her retirement from playing in 1985. It was in the 1970s, when women's football was in its infancy, that Lopez and her Southampton dominated the Women's FA Cup. She played for Roma CF in 1971 where she helped the club win the Italian League Cup. She returned to Southampton in order to improve her chances of playing for England.

Southampton won the WFA Cup eight times between 1971 and 1981, appearing in ten finals in that period, including the first nine in a row. Lopez scored in the winning finals of 1972 and 1978 against Lees Ladies and Queen's Park Rangers respectively. The 1981 final was the last that Lopez appeared in. Held at Knowsley Road, her side beat defending champions St Helens 4–2.

Lopez also won 22 caps as an England international, between 1973 and 1979. She has England legacy number 18. The FA announced their legacy numbers scheme to honour the 50th anniversary of England's inaugural international. Lopez played in the unofficial Women's World Cups held in Italy and Mexico respectively, where England finished in fourth place in 1970, and in sixth place in 1971.

== Coaching career ==
On retirement, in 1986, Lopez used her experience and knowledge of the game to coach women's football. This led to Lopez gaining the FA Advance Licence in 1991. In 1996, she gained the UEFA 'A' Licence conversion. Lopez was part-time manager of the Welsh national women's team from 1995 to 1996. Lopez then served as the Hampshire Football Association's Coaching and Development Officer until 2000.

Lopez was appointed director of women's football at Southampton in 2001. She took over managing the Southampton Saints first team as part of the role in 2003. In 2005, the Southampton men's team were relegated and scrapped their women's setup to save money, making Lopez redundant in the process.

== Recognition ==
Lopez was appointed Member of the Order of the British Empire (MBE) for services to women's football in the 2000 Birthday Honours.

In 2001, she became The Sunday Times Sportswomen of the Year Coach of the Year. In 2004, Lopez was inducted into the English Football Hall of Fame.

In 2022, Lopez was awarded as Southampton's "Forever Saint" to honour her achievements.

== Later life ==
In 2020, Lopez became the first women to publicly state that she believed her dementia diagnosis was as a direct result of heading footballs throughout her career. This has been a hot topic of debate in recent years since Jeff Astle's family campaigned for research into links between heading and a possible increase in the risk of being diagnosed with dementia later on in life. Lopez has called for youngsters to be stopped from heading the ball to help protect them.

== Publications ==
In 1997, Lopez published Women on the Ball, a women's football handbook tracing the history and development of the game in England and abroad.

== Honours ==
Southampton W.F.C.

- FA Women's Cup: 1971, 1972, 1973, 1975, 1976, 1978, 1979, 1981

England

- European Competition for Women's Football: 1969; third place, 1979; fourth place

Individual

- European Competition for Women's Football top scorer: 1969
