= Sandra Choat =

English footballer

Senior career*
Years	Team	Apps	(Gls)
- Amersham Angels
- Queen's Park Rangers
- Amersham Angels

International career
1974–1976	England	5	(4)
- * Club domestic league appearances and goals

Sandra Choat is a former England women's international footballer. Choat's greatest achievement in her club career was winning the 1977 WFA Cup Final with QPR.

== Club career ==
Choat started her career at Amersham Angels who she joined when she was fifteen years old. She moved to QPR in 1974. Choat played in three consecutive Women's FA Cup finals for QPR between 1976 and 1978, all against Southampton. In 1976 and 1978 her QPR team were defeated with Choat scoring a consolation goal in the latter at Wexham Park, Slough, which QPR lost 8–2. Choat was victorious in the competition however in 1977 when QPR beat Southampton 1–0. Choat said later that to beat the dominant Southampton team in an important match was "incredible". She returned to Amersham Angels and reportedly scored a career total of 406 goals in 360 matches across the clubs that she played at. In 1972 Choat scored ten goals in a game against Stevenage in a WEA Mitre Trophy first round fixture. The match finished 20–0.

== International career ==
Choat made her England debut against France in 1974. On Saturday 19 April 1975, Choat scored a hattrick against Switzerland in Basel.

In total she won five caps and scored four goals.

== Honours ==
Queen's Park Rangers

- FA Women's Cup: 1976–77
