= Pat Chapman (footballer) =

English footballer (born 1956)

Personal information
- Birth name: Patricia Chapman
- Date of birth: 21 July 1956 (age 70)
- Place of birth: Portsmouth, England
- Height: 5 ft 0 in (1.52 m)
- Position: Winger

Senior career*
Years	Team	Apps	(Gls)
- Tottonians
- Southampton WFC
- Red Star Southampton

International career
1976–1984	England	32	(13)

Managerial career
- Red Star Southampton
- * Club domestic league appearances and goals

Patricia "Pat" Chapman (born 21 July 1956) is a former Southampton WFC and England women's international footballer who played as a winger. She won 32 caps for England following her debut against Scotland in 1976 and competed at the 1984 European Competition for Women's Football. In 1978 Chapman scored a record six goals in the Women's FA Cup final in Southampton's 8–2 win over Queens Park Rangers. In total Chapman scored a record ten goals in WFA Cup finals and won the tournament six times between 1973 and 1981.

== Club career ==
Chapman won the WFA Cup for the first time in 1973 when Southampton beat Westthorn United L.F.C. She scored her first goal in a WFA Cup final in 1975 in a 4–2 defeat of Warminster L.F.C. Southampton then played QPR in three finals in a row, winning in 1976 and 1978. Chapman scored a record six goals in the 8–2 win in 1978 at Wexham Park, Slough. In the 1979 final she scored the only goal of the game in a 1-0 victory over Lowestoft Ladies at Jubilee Park, Waterlooville. Her sixth and final WFA Cup success came in 1981 with a 4–2 win over St Helens at Knowsley Road, with Chapman scoring twice. Overall she scored a record 10 goals in WFA Cup finals and won the tournament six times.

== International career ==
In November 2022, Chapman was recognized by The Football Association as one of the England national team's legacy players, and as the 33rd women's player to be capped by England.

== Honours ==
Southampton

- Women's FA Cup: 1972–73, 1974–75, 1975–76, 1977–78, 1978-79, 1980-81

England

- UEFA Women's Championship runner-up: 1984
