= 1976–77 WFA Cup =

Tournament details
- Country: England & Wales

Final positions
- Champions: Queen's Park Rangers
- Runners-up: Southampton
- Penalty shoot-outs do not count towards the total number of goals.

The 1976–77 WFA Cup was an association football knockout tournament for women's teams, held between 3 October 1976 and 15 May 1977. It was the 7th season of the WFA Cup and was won by Queen's Park Rangers, who defeated Southampton in the final.

The tournament consisted of seven rounds of competition proper.

All match results and dates from the Women's FA Cup Website.

== Group A ==
=== Second round proper ===
All games were originally scheduled for 31 October 1976.

Tie	Home team (tier)	Score	Away team (tier)	Att.
1	Prestatyn	7–1	Fodens	
Home team to be confirmed

== Group B ==
=== First round proper ===
All games were scheduled for 3 October 1976.

Tie	Home team (tier)	Score	Away team (tier)	Att.
First Round – Group B
1	Holbrooks Athletic	4–3	ATV	
Home team to be confirmed

=== Second round proper ===
All games were originally scheduled for 31 October 1976.

Tie	Home team (tier)	Score	Away team (tier)	Att.
1	Holbrooks Athletic	1–6	Coventry Bantams	
Home team to be confirmed

== Group C ==
=== First round proper ===
All games were scheduled for 3 October 1976.

Tie	Home team (tier)	Score	Away team (tier)	Att.
1	Bracknell	?–?	Ashford Town	
2	Dartford College	?–?	Thanet Bluebirds	
Home team to be confirmed

=== Second round proper ===
All games were originally scheduled for 31 October 1976.

Tie	Home team (tier)	Score	Away team (tier)	Att.
1	Dartford College	?–?	Marmion Centre	
Home team to be confirmed

=== Third round proper ===
All games were originally scheduled for 5 December 1976.

Tie	Home team (tier)	Score	Away team (tier)	Att.
1	Bracknell	2–1 (a.e.t.)	C&C Sports	
2	Dartford College	4–1	Maidstone Mote United	

== Group D ==
=== First round proper ===
All games were scheduled for 3 October 1976.

Tie	Home team (tier)	Score	Away team (tier)	Att.
1	Bristol Bluebirds	0–9	Southampton	

=== Second round proper ===
All games were originally scheduled for 31 October 1976.

Tie	Home team (tier)	Score	Away team (tier)	Att.
1	Southampton	3–1	Warminster Wanderers	

=== Third round proper ===
All games were originally scheduled for 5 December 1976.

Tie	Home team (tier)	Score	Away team (tier)	Att.
1	Southampton	3–1	Cope Chat	

== Group E ==
=== First round proper ===
All games were scheduled for 3 October 1976.

Tie	Home team (tier)	Score	Away team (tier)	Att.
1	Bellington United	1–17	Queens Park Rangers	
2	Chelsea	30–1	Prettygate Swifts	
3	Willesden	2–0	Lowestoft	

=== Second round proper ===
All games were originally scheduled for 31 October 1976.

Tie	Home team (tier)	Score	Away team (tier)	Att.
1	Queens Park Rangers	3–2	Spurs	
2	Willesden	8–0	Millwall Lionesses	
Home team to be confirmed

=== Third round proper ===
All games were originally scheduled for 5 December 1976.

Tie	Home team (tier)	Score	Away team (tier)	Att.
1	Chelsea	2–3	Queens Park Rangers	
2	Willesden	6–1	Amersham Angels	

== Group F ==
=== First round proper ===
All games were scheduled for 3 October 1976.

Tie	Home team (tier)	Score	Away team (tier)	Att.
1	Hull Brewery	8–3	Cleveland Spartans	
2	Kilnhurst Shooting Stars	5–2	Doncaster Belles	
3	Wallsend	4–1	Reckitts	

=== Second round proper ===
All games were originally scheduled for 31 October 1976.

Tie	Home team (tier)	Score	Away team (tier)	Att.
1	Hull Brewery	?–?	Bronte	
Bye: Wallsend

=== Third round proper ===
All games were originally scheduled for 5 December 1976.

Tie	Home team (tier)	Score	Away team (tier)	Att.
1	Kilnhurst Shooting Stars	6–0	Hull Brewery	
2	Wallsend	4–2	Bronte	

== Group G ==
=== First round proper ===
All games were scheduled for 3 October 1976.

Tie	Home team (tier)	Score	Away team (tier)	Att.
1	BYC Argyle (Burwell Youth Club)	7–1	Fishtoft	
2	EMGALS	3–1	Notts Rangers	

=== Second round proper ===
All games were originally scheduled for 31 October 1976.

Tie	Home team (tier)	Score	Away team (tier)	Att.
1	BYC Argyle (Burwell Youth Club)	10–3	Town & County	

== Regional finals ==
All games were originally scheduled for 9 and 30 January and 6 February 1977.

Tie	Home team (tier)	Score	Away team (tier)	Att.
1	Birmingham City	1–3	Kays	
2	Dartford College	1–0	Bracknell	
3	EMGALS	2–1	BYC Argyle (Burwell Youth Club)	
4	St Helens	0–1	Preston North End	
5	Tiverton Town	2–3	Plymouth Pilgrims	
6	Wallsend	0–7	Kilnhurst Shooting Stars	
7	Waterlooville	1–6	Southampton	
8	Willesden	1–3	Queens Park Rangers	

== Quarter–finals ==
All games were played on 20 and 27 February and 6 March 1977.

Tie	Home team (tier)	Score	Away team (tier)	Att.
1	Dartford College	2–3	Southampton	
2	EMGALS	3–1	Plymouth Pilgrims	
3	Preston North End	6–1	Kays	
4	Queens Park Rangers	5–2	Kilnhurst Shooting Stars	

== Semi–finals ==
All games were played on 20 March 1977.

Tie	Home team (tier)	Score	Away team (tier)	Att.
1	Preston North End	0–2	Southampton	
2	Queens Park Rangers	2–1	EMGALS	

== Final ==
15 May 1977
15:00 BST

Southampton	0–1	Queen's Park Rangers
	Report	Staley 25'

Champion Hill, London
Referee: J. E. Bent
