= Paddy McGroarty =

English footballer

Personal information
- Full name: Margaret McGroarty

Senior career*
Years	Team	Apps	(Gls)
- Cambuslang Hooverettes
- Buckingham
- Thame
- Queen's Park Rangers L.F.C.

International career
1972‍–‍1974	England	6	(5)
- * Club domestic league appearances and goals

Paddy McGroarty is a former England women's international footballer. She played for England in their first ever international in 1972. McGroarty won the 1977 WFA Cup final with QPR.

== Club career ==
McGroarty played for Queen's Park Rangers L.F.C. in each of their three consecutive Women's FA Cup finals against Southampton, and scored their only goal in their 1976 final defeat. QPR got revenge in 1977 winning the match 1-0 before Southampton regained the trophy with an 8-2 defeat of QPR in 1978 at Wexham Park.

== International career ==
Paddy McGroarty made her first appearance for England against Scotland on 18 November 1972, with England winning 3–2. In November 2022, McGroarty was recognized by The Football Association as one of the England national team's legacy players, and as the 6th women's player to be capped by England. Having emigrated to Melbourne, Australia, McGroarty was presented with her legacy cap after visiting the England team who were training at nearby Sunshine Coast Stadium whilst on tour of the country.

== Honours ==
QPR

- FA Women's Cup: 1976–77
