= Eileen Foreman =

English footballer

Personal information
- Date of birth: Warminster, England
- Position: Wide midfielder

Senior career*
Years	Team	Apps	(Gls)
1972-1982	Warminster L.F.C.		

International career
1973-1981	England	16	(10)
- * Club domestic league appearances and goals

Eileen Foreman is a former England women's international footballer.

== Career ==
Foreman helped take Warminster L.F.C. to the 1975 WFA Cup Final where they lost 4-2 to Southampton Women's F.C. During the match Foreman scored twice, including the first penalty scored in a WFA Cup final, however she also became the first player to miss a penalty in a final after Sue Buckett saved her effort earlier in the match.

== International career ==
Eileen Foreman was in the squad for England first official match on 18 November 1972, which was played against Scotland. England recorded a 3–2 victory. She scored her first goal in a 3‍–‍0 win over France at Stade Brion on 22 April 1973.

On 7 October 2022, Foreman was recognized by The Football Association as one of the England national team's legacy players, and as the 14th women's player to be capped by England.
