= Women's FA Cup =

- Organiser(s): The Football Association
- Founded: 1970; 56 years ago
- Region: England; Wales
- Teams: 538 (2025–26)
- Current champions: Manchester City (4th title)
- Most championships: Arsenal (14 titles)
- Broadcaster(s): TNT Sports; Channel 4
- Website: Women's FA Cup
- 2026–27 Women's FA Cup

The Women's FA Challenge Cup is the top annual cup tournament for women's clubs in English football. Founded in 1970, it has been named the WFA Cup, FA Women's Cup, and now Women's FA Cup (currently known as the Adobe Women's FA Cup for sponsorship reasons).

Designed as an equivalent to the FA Cup in men's football, the competition began in 1970–71 as the Mitre Challenge Trophy, organised by the Women's Football Association (WFA). There were 71 entrants, including teams from Scotland and Wales.

The WFA ran the competition for the first 23 editions, during which time Southampton won the cup eight times. The Football Association (FA) began administering English women's football in mid-1993.

Arsenal holds the record for most titles overall, having won fourteen times. The current cup holders are Manchester City, who defeated Brighton & Hove Albion 4–0 in the 2026 final to win their fourth FA Cup title.

== Name ==
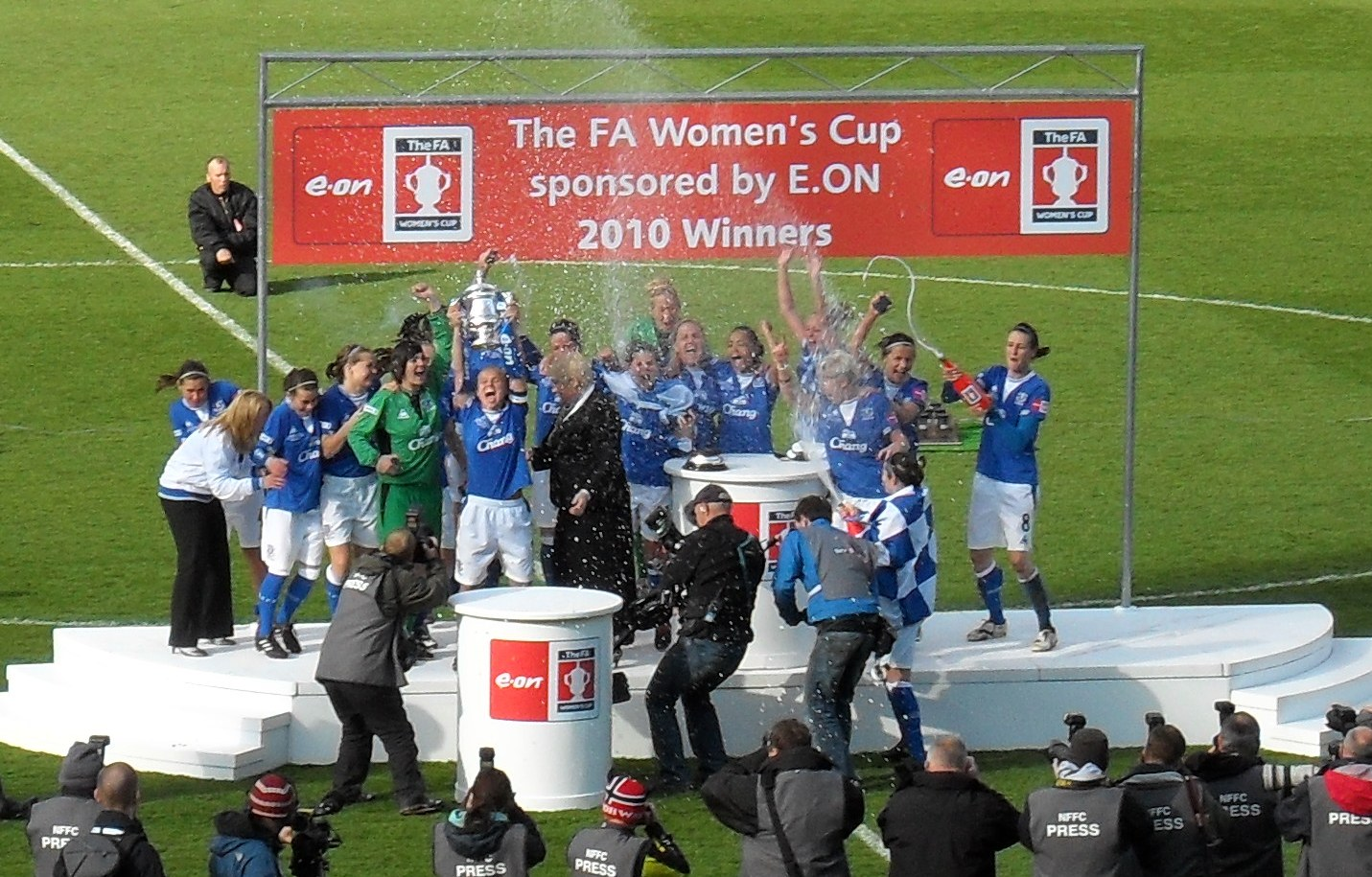
Everton players with the FA Women's Cup trophy in 2010

The competition, founded in 1970, was sponsored as the Mitre Challenge Trophy until April 1976.

As a Women's Football Association competition until 1992–93, it was known as the WFA Cup or more informally as the Women's FA Cup. After the running of the competition passed to the FA in 1993–94, the Association renamed it as the FA Women's Cup, until 2015. The name was officially reworded as the Women's FA Cup in June 2015, before that year's final. The tournament rules, as in the men's FA Cup, name it the Women's FA Challenge Cup.

== History ==
Previous national cup competitions included the English Ladies Football Association Challenge Cup in 1922, won by Stoke Ladies.

The first women's Mitre Challenge Trophy matches were played in 1970, and the first final was held on 9 May 1971 at Crystal Palace National Sports Centre. The WFA was initially named the Ladies Football Association of Great Britain, and Scottish clubs were successful in reaching the first three finals of this tournament (albeit as runners-up). Two of these clubs were runners-up in England while also winning the Scottish Women's Cup in the same season, Stewarton Thistle in 1971 and Westthorn United in 1973.

Southampton Women's F.C. won eight of the first 11 WFA Cup competitions.

Doncaster Belles reached nearly every final between 1982–83 and 1993–94, and won the trophy six times.

== Format ==
The current entry points as of the 2024–25 season:

- the second qualifying round for Tier 5 teams (92 teams)
- the third qualifying round for FA Women's National League Division One teams (48 teams)
- the second round proper for FA Women's National League North & South Premier Division teams (24 teams)
- the third round proper for Women's Championship teams (11 teams)
- the fourth round proper for Women's Super League teams (12 teams)

All other clubs enter in the first qualifying round.

== Trophies ==
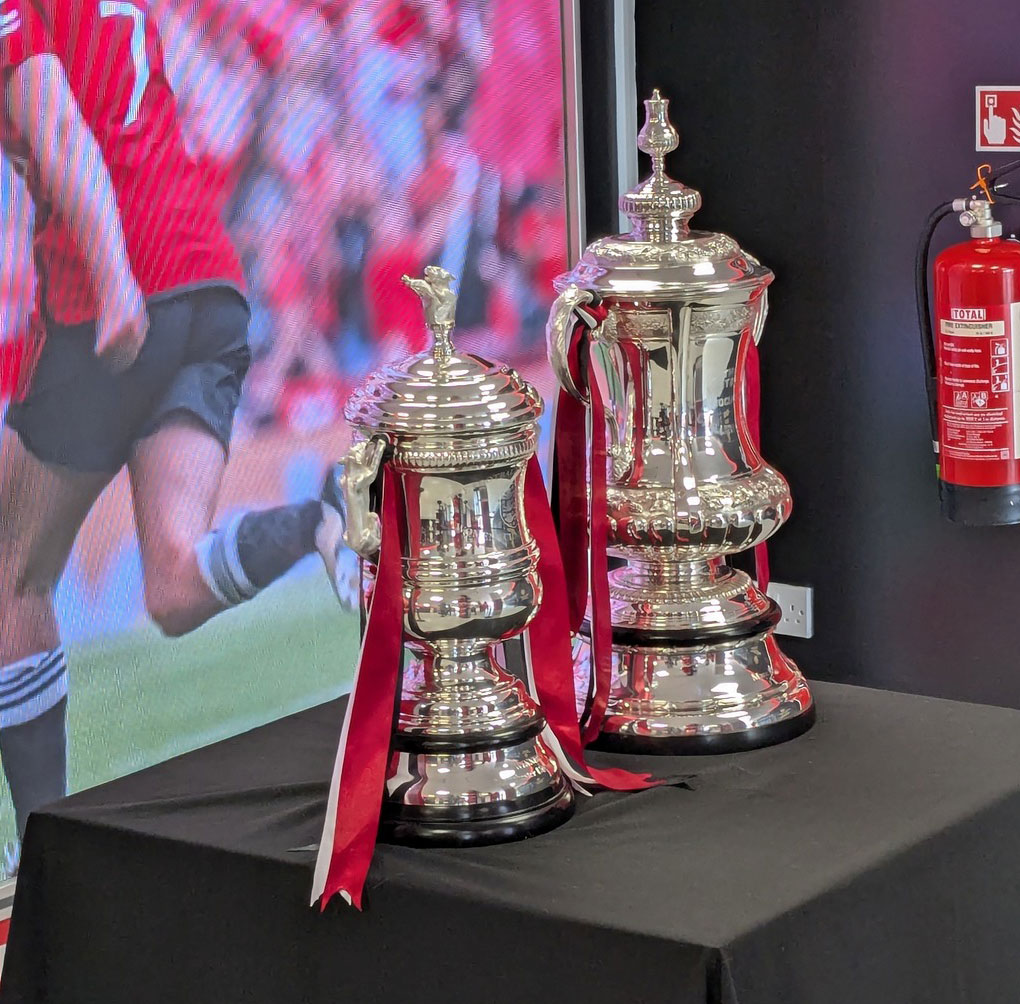
Women's FA Cup (left) trophy on display beside the men's trophy (right).

The original Mitre Challenge Trophy has "disappeared", according to the WFA History records. This cup was replaced in May 1979 when the Football Association donated a new trophy for the competition's winners, to mark the WFA's tenth anniversary.

1970–71 cup winner Sue Lopez said it was suspected that a player "tucked it away somewhere in a trophy cabinet", and she was trying to locate the original cup for the National Football Museum in 2015.

The current Women's FA Cup trophy was one of the first prestigious trophies to be made in the Thomas Lyte silver workshop.

== List of finals ==
The following is a list of Women's FA Cup seasons and final results.

Finalists are primarily clubs from England, unless denoted with for Scotland.
Where a season's Final is marked in bold, it has a specific article for the match.

Season	Winners	Score	Runners-up	Scorers	Venue
1970–71 (final)	Southampton	4–1	(Scotland) Stewarton Thistle	Southampton: Davies (3), Cassell; Stewarton: Reilly	Crystal Palace National Sports Centre
1971–72 (final)	Southampton	3–2	(Scotland) Lee's Ladies	Southampton: Judd (2), Lopez; Lee's: White, Ferries	Eton Park, Burton upon Trent; Attendance: 1,500
1972–73 (final)	Southampton	2–0	(Scotland) Westthorn United	Kenway 70', Hale 75'	Bedford Town FC; Attendance: 3,000
1973–74 (final)	Fodens	2–1	Southampton	Fodens: Leatherbarrow (2); Southampton: Davies	Bedford Town FC; Attendance: 800
1974–75 (final)	Southampton	4–2	Warminster	Southampton: Chapman, Dickie, Davies, Hale; Warminster: Foreman (2; 1 pen.)	Dunstable Town FC
1975–76 (final)	Southampton	2–1 (a.e.t.)	Queen's Park Rangers	Southampton: M. Kirkland, Davies; QPR: McGroarty	Bedford Town FC; Attendance: 1,500
1976–77 (final)	Queen's Park Rangers	1–0	Southampton	Staley 25'	Champion Hill, East Dulwich; Attendance: 3,000
1977–78 (final)	Southampton	8–2	Queen's Park Rangers	Southampton: Davies, Lopez, Chapman (6); QPR: Choat, Staley	Wexham Park Stadium, Slough; Attendance: 200
1978–79 (final)	Southampton	1–0	Lowestoft Ladies	Chapman 6'	Waterlooville FC; Attendance: 1,200
1979–80 (final)	St Helens	1–0	Preston North End	Holland 75'	Southbury Road, Enfield
1980–81 (final)	Southampton	4–2	St Helens	Southampton: Chapman 12', 58', England 45', Carter 71'; St Helens: Leatherbarrow 26', Ja. Turner 65'	Knowsley Road, St Helens; Attendance: 1,352
1981–82 (final)	Lowestoft Ladies	2–0	Cleveland Spartans	Linda Curl 26', Poppy 57'	Loftus Road; Attendance: ~1,000 (Note: Staged as a curtain-raiser to Queens Park Rangers' 1981–82 Football League Second Division fixture against Bolton Wanderers.)
1982–83 (final)	Doncaster Belles	3–2	St Helens	Doncaster: Stocks (2), J. Hanson; St Helens: Leatherbarrow, Deighan	Sincil Bank, Lincoln; Attendance: 1,500
1983–84 (final)	Howbury Grange	4–2	Doncaster Belles	Howbury: Baldeo (2), Springett (2); Doncaster: L. Hanson (2)	Sincil Bank, Lincoln
1984–85 (final)	Friends of Fulham	2–0	Doncaster Belles	McAdam 22', Hynes 25'	Craven Cottage, Fulham; Attendance: 1,500
1985–86 (final)	Norwich City	4–3	Doncaster Belles	Norwich: Curl 16', Colk 40', Jackson 50', Lawrence 80+2'; Doncaster: J. Hanson 26', Walker 27', 75'	Carrow Road, Norwich
1986–87 (final)	Doncaster Belles	2–0	St Helens	Sherrard 12', Walker 80'	City Ground, Nottingham
1987–88 (final)	Doncaster Belles	3–1	Leasowe Pacific	Doncaster: Walker, Coultard, Sherrard; Leasowe: Jackson (pen.)	Gresty Road, Crewe; Attendance: 800
1988–89 (final)	Leasowe Pacific	3–2	Friends of Fulham	Leasowe: Murray 7', Thomas 47', McQuiggan 65'; Fulham: Powell 8', 40'	Old Trafford, Manchester; Attendance: 941
1989–90 (final)	Doncaster Belles	1–0	Friends of Fulham	Coultard 61'	Baseball Ground; Attendance: 3,000
1990–91 (final)	Millwall Lionesses	1–0	Doncaster Belles	Baldeo 65'	Prenton Park; Attendance: 4,000
1991–92 (final)	Doncaster Belles	4–0	Red Star Southampton	Coultard 38', Walker 47', 65' 78'	Prenton Park; Attendance: 250
1992–93 (final)	Arsenal	3–0	Doncaster Belles	Curley 45', Ball 45', Bampton 80'	Manor Ground, Oxford; Attendance: 3,547
1993–94 (final)	Doncaster Belles	1–0	Knowsley United	Walker 38'	Glanford Park; Attendance: 1,674
1994–95 (final)	Liverpool	2–3	Arsenal	Liverpool: Burke 24', 41' Arsenal: Lonergan 36', 55', Spacey 81'	Prenton Park
1995–96 (final)	Croydon	1–1 (a.e.t.); 3–2 (p)	Liverpool	Liverpool: Burke 22'; Croydon: Powell 38'	The New Den; Attendance: 2,110
1996–97 (final)	Millwall Lionesses	1–0	Wembley	Waller 51'	Upton Park; Attendance: 3,015
1997–98 (final)	Arsenal	3–2	Croydon	Arsenal: Spacey 17', Yankey 52', Few 90+3'; Croydon: Broadhurst (pen.) 10', Powell 55'	The New Den
1998–99 (final)	Arsenal	2–0	Southampton Saints	Hayes (o.g.) 14', Wheatley 41'	The Valley; Attendance: 6,450
1999–2000 (final)	Doncaster Belles	1–2	Croydon	Doncaster: Exley 40' Croydon: C.Walker 40', Hunt 67'	Bramall Lane; Attendance: 3,434
2000–01 (final)	Arsenal	1–0	Fulham	Banks 52'	Selhurst Park; Attendance: 13,824
2001–02 (final)	Fulham	2–1	Doncaster Belles	Fulham: Yankey 55', Chapman 56'; Doncaster: Handley 58'	Selhurst Park; Attendance: 10,124
2002–03 (final)	Fulham	3–0	Charlton Athletic	Moore 18', Hills (o.g.) 36', Williams (o.g.) 61'	Selhurst Park; Attendance: 10,389
2003–04 (final)	Arsenal	3–0	Charlton Athletic	Fleeting 23', 25', 83'	Loftus Road; Attendance: 12,244
2004–05 (final)	Charlton Athletic	1–0	Everton	Aluko 58'	Upton Park; Attendance: 8,567
2005–06 (final)	Arsenal	5–0	Leeds United	Ward (o.g.) 3', Fleeting 34', Yankey 35', Smith (pen.) 73', Sanderson 77'	The New Den; Attendance: 13,452
2006–07 (final)	Arsenal	4–1	Charlton Athletic	Charlton: Holtham 2'; Arsenal: Smith 7', 80', Ludlow 15', 45'	City Ground; Attendance: 24,529
2007–08 (final)	Arsenal	4–1	Leeds United	Arsenal: Smith 54', 83', Ludlow 59', Sanderson 60'; Leeds: Clarke 69'	City Ground; Attendance: 24,582
2008–09 (final)	Arsenal	2–1	Sunderland	Arsenal: Chapman 32', Little 90'; Sunderland: McDougall 90'	Pride Park Stadium; Attendance: 23,291
2009–10 (final)	Everton	3–2 (a.e.t.)	Arsenal	Arsenal: Little (pen.) 43', Fleeting 54'; Everton: Dowie 16', 119', White (o.g.) 45+2'	City Ground; Attendance: 17,505
2010–11 (final)	Arsenal	2–0	Bristol Academy	Little 19', Fleeting 32'	Ricoh Arena; Attendance: 13,885
2011–12 (final)	Birmingham City	2–2 (a.e.t.) (3–2 p)	Chelsea	Birmingham City: Williams 90', Carney 111'; Chelsea: Lander 69', Longhurst 101'	Ashton Gate; Attendance: 8,723
2012–13 (final)	Arsenal	3–0	Bristol Academy	Houghton 2', Nobbs 72', White 90'	Keepmoat Stadium; Attendance: 4,988
2013–14 (final)	Arsenal	2–0	Everton	Smith 15', Kinga 61'	Stadium MK; Attendance: 15,098
2014–15 (final)	Chelsea	1–0	Notts County	Ji So-yun 39'	Wembley Stadium; Attendance: 30,710
2015–16 (final)	Arsenal	1–0	Chelsea	Carter 18'	Wembley Stadium; Attendance: 32,912
2016–17 (final)	Manchester City	4–1	Birmingham City	Manchester City: Bronze 18', Christiansen 25', Lloyd 32', Scott 80'; Birmingham City: Wellings 73'	Wembley Stadium; Attendance: 35,271
2017–18 (final)	Chelsea	3–1	Arsenal	Chelsea: Bachmann 48', 60', Kirby 76'; Arsenal: Miedema 73'	Wembley Stadium; Attendance: 45,423
2018–19 (final)	Manchester City	3–0	West Ham United	Walsh 52', Stanway 81', Hemp 88'	Wembley Stadium; Attendance: 43,264
2019–20 (final)	Manchester City	3–1 (a.e.t.)	Everton	Manchester City: Mewis 40', Stanway 111', Beckie 120+2'; Everton: Gauvin 60'	Wembley Stadium; Behind closed doors (COVID-19 pandemic)
2020–21 (final)	Chelsea	3–0	Arsenal	Kirby 3', Kerr 57', 77'	Wembley Stadium; Attendance: 40,942
2021–22 (final)	Chelsea	3–2 (a.e.t.)	Manchester City	Chelsea: Kerr 33', 99', Cuthbert 63'; Manchester City: Hemp 42', Raso 89'	Wembley Stadium; Attendance: 49,094
2022–23 (final)	Chelsea	1–0	Manchester United	Kerr 68'	Wembley Stadium; Attendance: 77,390
2023–24 (final)	Manchester United	4–0	Tottenham Hotspur	Toone 45+3', Williams 54', García 57', 74'	Wembley Stadium; Attendance: 76,082
2024–25 (final)	Chelsea	3–0	Manchester United	Baltimore 45' (pen.), 90+1', Macario 84'	Wembley Stadium; Attendance: 74,412
2025–26 (final)	Manchester City	4–0	Brighton & Hove Albion	Shaw 38', Greenwood 45+6', Fujino 66', Miedema 87'	Wembley Stadium; Attendance: 43,917

== Results by team ==
Performances in the Women's FA Cup by club
Club	Title(s)	Runners-up	Seasons won	Seasons runner-up
Arsenal	14	3	1992–93, 1994–95, 1997–98, 1998–99, 2000–01, 2003–04, 2005–06, 2006–07, 2007–08, 2008–09, 2010–11, 2012–13, 2013–14, 2015–16	2009–10, 2017–18, 2020–21
Southampton Women's	8	2	1970–71, 1971–72, 1972–73, 1974–75, 1975–76, 1977–78, 1978–79, 1980–81	1973–74, 1976–77
Doncaster Belles	6	7	1982–83, 1986–87, 1987–88, 1989–90, 1991–92, 1993–94	1983–84, 1984–85, 1985–86, 1990–91, 1992–93, 1999–2000, 2001–02
Chelsea	6	2	2014–15, 2017–18, 2020–21, 2021–22, 2022–23, 2024–25	2011–12, 2015–16
Manchester City	4	1	2016–17, 2018–19, 2019–20, 2025–26	2021–22
Croydon/Charlton Athletic	3	4	1995–96, 1999–2000, 2004–05	1997–98, 2002–03, 2003–04, 2006–07
Leasowe Pacific/Everton	2	4	1988–89, 2009–10	1987–88, 2004–05, 2013–14, 2019–20
Fulham	2	1	2001–02, 2002–03	2000–01
Millwall Lionesses	2	0	1990–91, 1996–97	—
St Helens	1	3	1979–80	1980–81, 1982–83, 1986–87
Queen's Park Rangers	1	2	1976–77	1975–76, 1977–78
Friends of Fulham	1	2	1984–85	1988–89, 1989–90
Manchester United	1	2	2023–24	2022–23, 2024–25
Lowestoft Ladies	1	1	1981–82	1978–79
Birmingham City	1	1	2011–12	2016–17
Fodens	1	0	1973–74	—
Howbury Grange	1	0	1983–84	—
Norwich City	1	0	1985–86	—
Knowsley United/Liverpool	0	3	—	1993–94, 1994–95, 1995–96
Stewarton & Thistle/ Lee's Ladies (Scotland)	0	2	—	1970–71, 1971–72
Red Star Southampton/ Southampton Saints	0	2	—	1991–92, 1998–99
Leeds United	0	2	—	2005–06, 2007–08
Bristol Academy	0	2	—	2010–11, 2012–13
Westthorn United (Scotland)	0	1	—	1972–73
Warminster	0	1	—	1974–75
Preston North End	0	1	—	1979–80
Cleveland Spartans	0	1	—	1981–82
Wembley	0	1	—	1996–97
Sunderland	0	1	—	2008–09
Notts County	0	1	—	2014–15
West Ham United	0	1	—	2018–19
Tottenham Hotspur	0	1	—	2023–24
Brighton & Hove Albion	0	1	—	2025–26

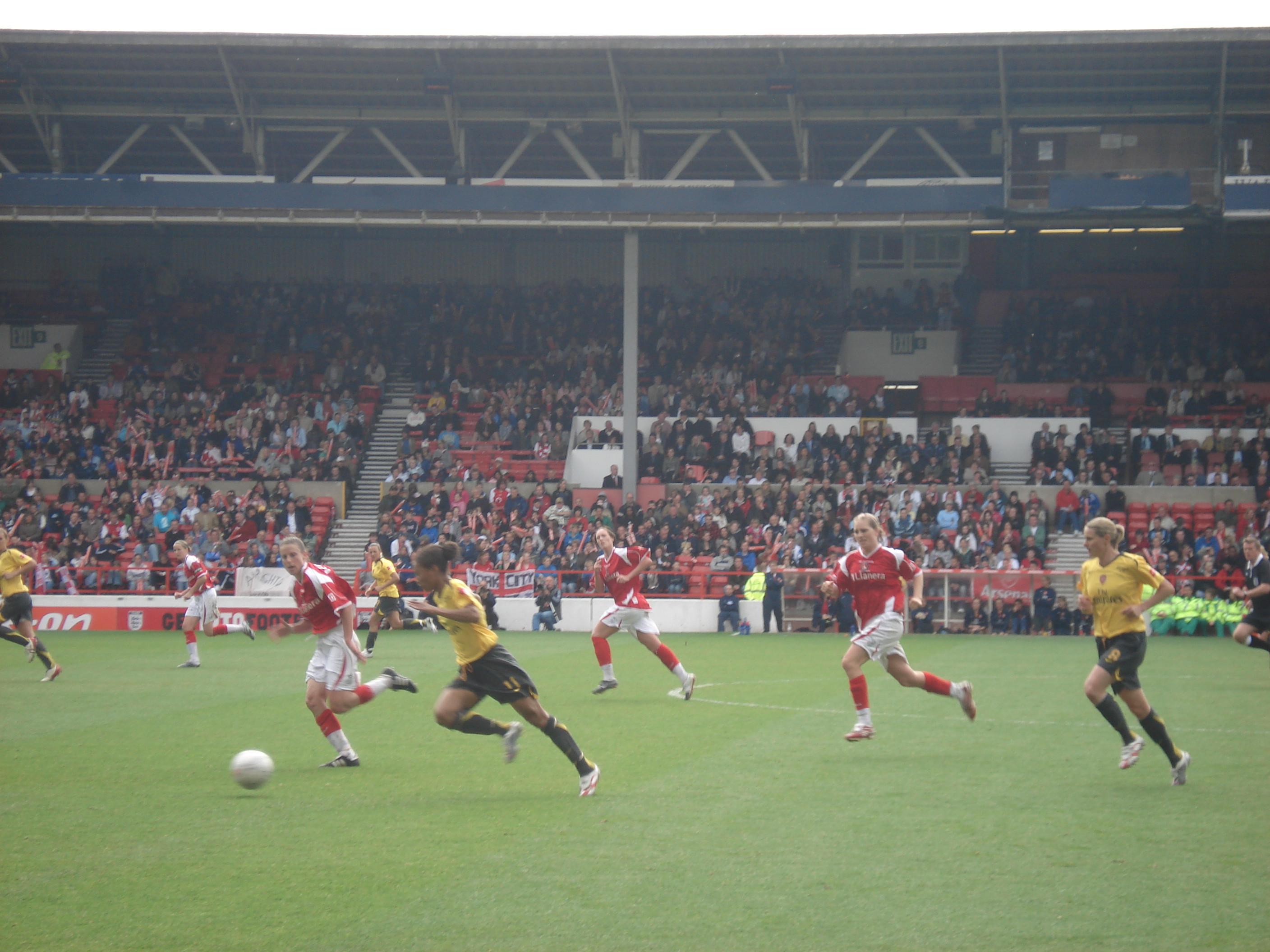
Arsenal and Charlton contest the 2007 FA Women's Cup final at the City Ground

== Media coverage ==
=== United Kingdom and Ireland ===
In the late 1980s and early 1990s, television coverage of the WFA final was provided by Channel 4.

Between 2001 and 2008, the final of the tournament was covered by the BBC and presented by Celina Hinchcliffe, Rebecca Lowe, Ray Stubbs and Jake Humphrey; the punditry team was usually current players like Sue Scott and commentary usually by Steve Wilson and Lucy Ward or Faye White and always played on the May Day bank holiday. The final was also simulcast on BBC Radio 5 Live. In 2009, the final was shown on most of the stations in the ITV1 network, with commentary from Jon Champion and Lucy Ward. Sky Sports secured a three-year deal for live coverage from 2010 until 2012.

The BBC then picked up the rights in 2013 and that lasted until 2025.

On 16 May 2025, the FA officially announced that coverage would be moved to TNT Sports and also make a return to Channel 4. Under the deal, which lasts until the 2027–28 season, TNT Sports will air 19 matches including one match in the first round and one in the second round for the first time in history. Channel 4 will televise one match per round starting in the third round, with all five of Channel 4's selected matches, and the Final also airing on TNT Sports, with both broadcasters having their own presenters, pundits and commentary teams.

=== International ===
Territory	Network
Unsold markets	YouTube
Australia	Stan Sport
Austria	DAZN
Germany	DAZN
Switzerland	DAZN
Caribbean	Rush Sports
Croatia	Zona Sport
Ghana	Sporty TV
Kenya	Sporty TV
Nigeria	Sporty TV
South Africa	Sporty TV
Iran	Persiana Sports
Israel	Charlton
Japan	U-Next
Latin America	ESPN
Norway	VG
Poland	Polsat Sport
Spain	Movistar Plus+
United States	CBS Sports

== Sponsorship ==
Sponsors of the original WFA competition (1970–1993) included Mitre, Pony Wines and Mycil.

In the FA competition, the sponsors have been UK Living (1995–1998), Axa (1998–2002), Nationwide Building Society (2002–2006) and E.ON (2006–2011). From 2007, Tesco obtained additional branding and advertising rights through their partnership agreement with the FA.

Despite sponsorship by these major companies, entering the tournament has actually cost clubs more than they often get in prize money. In 2015 it was reported that even if Notts County had won the tournament outright the paltry £8,600 winnings would leave them out of pocket. The winners of the men's FA Cup in the same year received £1.8 million, with teams not even reaching the first round proper getting more than the women's winners. In September 2020, the FA announced that health and life insurance and investment company VitalityHealth had signed a deal to become the sponsor of the competition until July 2023.

In November 2023, after three years with Vitality, the FA announced that Adobe Inc. would become the sponsor of the competition for three years, through to July 2026. The partnership would focus on "increasing fan engagement and raising the profile of the competition". In addition, all 460 clubs that participate in the competition would gain access to, and training on Adobe Express, a graphic design tool.

== See also ==
- FA Women's National League Cup
- FA Women's League Cup
- List of women's association football clubs
