= 1978–79 WFA Cup =

Tournament details
- Country: England & Wales

Final positions
- Champions: Southampton
- Runners-up: Lowestoft
- Penalty shoot-outs do not count towards the total number of goals.

The 1978–79 WFA Cup was an association football knockout tournament for women's teams, held between 8 October 1978 and 6 May 1979. It was the 9th season of the WFA Cup and was won by Southampton, who defeated Lowestoft in the final.

The tournament consisted of one preliminary round and seven rounds of competition proper.

All match results and dates from the Women's FA Cup Website.

== Preliminary round ==
All games were scheduled for 8 October 1978.

Tie	Home team (tier)	Score	Away team (tier)	Att.
1	County Canaries	0–8	BYC Argyle (Burwell Youth Club)	
2	East Herts College	H–W	Wealdstone	
Wealdstone withdrew, walkover for East Herts College.
3	Flackwell Heath	1–29	Amersham Angels	
4	Rowntrees	0–3	Bronte	
5	Solihull	2–0	Birmingham City	
6	Teynham Strykers	6–4	Gillingham	

== Group A ==
=== First round proper ===
All games were scheduled for 5 November 1978.

Tie	Home team (tier)	Score	Away team (tier)	Att.
1	Exmouth	1–4 (a.e.t.)	Redruth YC	
2	Pelynt	0–4	Exeter	
3	Plymouth Pilgrims	H–W	Nat West Exeter	
Nat West withdrew. Walkover for Plymouth Pilgrims.
4	Torbay United	9–0	Kingsteignton	

=== Second round proper ===
All games were originally scheduled for 3 and 10 December 1978.

Tie	Home team (tier)	Score	Away team (tier)	Att.
1	Exeter	1–3 (aet)	Plymouth Pilgrims	
2	Redruth YC	?–?	Torbay United	

== Group B ==
=== First round proper ===
All games were scheduled for 5 November 1978.

Tie	Home team (tier)	Score	Away team (tier)	Att.
1	Chard	0–4	Tiverton	
2	Elmore	2–2 (a.e.t.)	Top Rank	
replay	Top Rank	?–? (3–4 p)	Elmore	
3	RNSTS Bath	0–1	Bath City	
4	Warminster Wanderers	4–3	East Avon	

=== Second round proper ===
All games were originally scheduled for 3 and 10 December 1978.

Tie	Home team (tier)	Score	Away team (tier)	Att.
1	Bath City	1–6	Tiverton	
2	Warminster Wanderers	11–0	Elmore	

== Group C ==
=== First round proper ===
All games were scheduled for 5 November 1978.

Tie	Home team (tier)	Score	Away team (tier)	Att.
1	Cove Krakatoa	3–20	Newbury	
2	Kingston Grasshoppers	4–2	Totton	
3	Southampton	14–1	Basingstoke	
4	Swindon Spitfires	0–2	Romsonian	

=== Second round proper ===
All games were originally scheduled for 3 and 10 December 1978.

Tie	Home team (tier)	Score	Away team (tier)	Att.
1	Newbury	1–9	Southampton	
2	Romsonian	4–3	Kingston Grasshoppers	

== Group D ==
=== First round proper ===
All games were scheduled for 5 November 1978.

Tie	Home team (tier)	Score	Away team (tier)	Att.
1	Courthope	0–7	Horam Mudlarks	
2	Havant	3–2	Shoreham	
3	Prism	1–4	C&C Sports	
4	Waterlooville	2–0	Marmion Centre	

=== Second round proper ===
All games were originally scheduled for 3 and 10 December 1978.

Tie	Home team (tier)	Score	Away team (tier)	Att.
1	C&C Sports	1–5	Waterlooville	
2	Havant	5–2	Horam Mudlarks	

== Group E ==
=== First round proper ===
All games were scheduled for 5 November 1978.

Tie	Home team (tier)	Score	Away team (tier)	Att.
1	Ashford Town	6–3	Thanet Bluebirds	
2	Dartford College	1–2	Teynham Strykers	
3	Diamond	0–5	Millwall Lionesses	
4	Herne Bay	0–14	Maidstone Mote United	

=== Second round proper ===
All games were originally scheduled for 3 and 10 December 1978.

Tie	Home team (tier)	Score	Away team (tier)	Att.
1	Ashford Town	1–7	Maidstone Mote United	
2	Millwall Lionesses	H–W	Teynham Strykers	
Teynham Strikers withdrew

== Group F ==
=== First round proper ===
All games were scheduled for 5 November 1978.

Tie	Home team (tier)	Score	Away team (tier)	Att.
1	Droitwich St. Andrews	3–2	Worcester	
2	Dursley Town	0–2	Chippenham Moonrakers	
3	Newport	2–5	Llanedeyrn	
4	Tildawn	0–7	Cope Chat	

=== Second round proper ===
All games were originally scheduled for 3 and 10 December 1978.

Tie	Home team (tier)	Score	Away team (tier)	Att.
1	Droitwich St. Andrews	1–3	Cope Chat	
2	Llanedeyrn	2–1	Chippenham Moonrakers	

== Group G ==
=== First round proper ===
All games were scheduled for 5 November 1978.

Tie	Home team (tier)	Score	Away team (tier)	Att.
1	Amersham Angels	2–2 (a.e.t.)	Aylesbury Harlequins	
replay	Aylesbury Harlequins	2–1 (a.e.t.)	Amersham Angels	
2	Bedford Town	0–4	Bracknell	
3	Bracknell Bullets	4–1	Town & County	
4	Thame	1–1 (a.e.t.)	Reading	
replay	Reading	5–3	Thame	

=== Second round proper ===
All games were originally scheduled for 3 and 10 December 1978.

Tie	Home team (tier)	Score	Away team (tier)	Att.
1	Bracknell Bullets	1–4	Bracknell	
2	Reading	0–8	Aylesbury Harlequins	

== Group H ==
=== First round proper ===
All games were scheduled for 5 November 1978.

Tie	Home team (tier)	Score	Away team (tier)	Att.
1	Luton	4–3	Luton Daytel	
2	Papworth Pendragons	12–0	Arlesey	
3	Sandridge	5–2	Northwood	
4	Stevenage	0–3	Watford	

=== Second round proper ===
All games were originally scheduled for 3 and 10 December 1978.

Tie	Home team (tier)	Score	Away team (tier)	Att.
1	Sandridge	3–3 (a.e.t.)	Luton	
replay	Luton	4–2	Sandridge	
2	Watford	6–0	Papworth	

== Group I ==
=== First round proper ===
All games were scheduled for 5 November 1978.

Tie	Home team (tier)	Score	Away team (tier)	Att.
1	Lowestoft	15–0	Colchester Swifts	
2	Romford	H–W	Thurrock	
Thurrock withdrew
3	Southend	3–1	Andrews Birdies	
4	Suffolk Bluebirds	6–1	Costessey	

=== Second round proper ===
All games were originally scheduled for 3 and 10 December 1978.

Tie	Home team (tier)	Score	Away team (tier)	Att.
1	Southend	0–4	Romford	
2	Suffolk Bluebirds	1–8	Lowestoft	

== Group J ==
=== First round proper ===
All games were scheduled for 5 November 1978.

Tie	Home team (tier)	Score	Away team (tier)	Att.
1	Bedworth United	1–3	Coventry Bantams	
2	Hamstead Birmingham	0–11	Coventry Athletic	
3	Leicester	1–5	EMGALS	
4	Warley	4–5	Solihull	

=== Second round proper ===
All games were originally scheduled for 3 and 10 December 1978.

Tie	Home team (tier)	Score	Away team (tier)	Att.
1	Coventry Bantams	7–5	Solihull	
2	EMGALS	3–2	Coventry United	

== Group K ==
=== First round proper ===
All games were scheduled for 5 November 1978.

Tie	Home team (tier)	Score	Away team (tier)	Att.
1	Doncaster	13–0	Syston Swifts	
2	Doncaster Belles	1–2	BYC Argyle (Burwell Youth Club)	
3	Kilnhurst	4–0	Rotherham	
4	Star Inn	0–19	Notts Rangers	

=== Second round proper ===
All games were originally scheduled for 3 and 10 December 1978.

Tie	Home team (tier)	Score	Away team (tier)	Att.
1	BYC Argyle (Burwell Youth Club)	1–5	Kilnhurst	
2	Doncaster	2–2 (a.e.t.)	Notts Rangers	
replay	Notts Rangers	3–0	Doncaster	

== Group L ==
=== First round proper ===
All games were scheduled for 5 November 1978.

Tie	Home team (tier)	Score	Away team (tier)	Att.
1	Crewe	A–W	Broadoak	
Crewe withdrew
2	Macclesfield	18–1	Urmston	
3	Manchester Corinthians	1–5	Fodens	
4	Zorbit	0–19	Ashton	

=== Second round proper ===
All games were originally scheduled for 3 and 10 December 1978.

Tie	Home team (tier)	Score	Away team (tier)	Att.
1	Fodens	7–1	Broadoak	
2	Macclesfield	3–1	Ashton	

== Group M ==
=== First round proper ===
All games were scheduled for 5 November 1978.

Tie	Home team (tier)	Score	Away team (tier)	Att.
1	Prestatyn	4–2	Rossendale	
2	Preston Rangers	10–1	Lostock Rangers	
3	St Helens	3–1	Prescot	
4	Victoria Hospital	0–13	Preston North End	

=== Second round proper ===
All games were originally scheduled for 3 and 10 December 1978.

Tie	Home team (tier)	Score	Away team (tier)	Att.
1	Preston North End	?–?	Prestatyn	
2	St Helens	?–?	Preston Rangers	

== Group N ==
=== First round proper ===
All games were scheduled for 5 November 1978.

Tie	Home team (tier)	Score	Away team (tier)	Att.
1	Bronte	12–1	Aycliffe Echoes	
2	Reckitts	4–2	Cleveland Rangers	
3	Sunderland	1–2	Hull Brewery	
4	Wallsend	1–6	Cleveland Spartans	

=== Second round proper ===
All games were originally scheduled for 3 and 10 December 1978.

Tie	Home team (tier)	Score	Away team (tier)	Att.
1	Bronte	?–?	Cleveland Spartans	
2	Cleveland Rangers	2–6	Hull Brewery	

== Group O ==
=== First round proper ===
All games were scheduled for 5 November 1978.

Tie	Home team (tier)	Score	Away team (tier)	Att.
1	Chelsea Supporters	17–0	BOC Morden	
2	Friends of Fulham	5–3	Molesey	
3	Hampton	11–0	Lewisham Deaf	
4	Shoreline	8–0	Millwall	

=== Second round proper ===
All games were originally scheduled for 3 and 10 December 1978.

Tie	Home team (tier)	Score	Away team (tier)	Att.
1	Friends of Fulham	4–3	Chelsea Supporters	
2	Hampton	0–8	Shoreline	

== Group P ==
=== First round proper ===
All games were scheduled for 5 November 1978.

Tie	Home team (tier)	Score	Away team (tier)	Att.
1	Gallaher	5–5	Fulham	
replay	Fulham	3–2	Gallaher	
2	Queens Park Rangers	4–0	Shelburne	
3	West Ham United	3–7	Spurs	
4	Willesden	5–0	East Herts College	

=== Second round proper ===
All games were originally scheduled for 3 and 10 December 1978.

Tie	Home team (tier)	Score	Away team (tier)	Att.
1	Queens Park Rangers	4–1	Willesden	
2	Spurs	6–0	Fulham	

== Regional finals ==
All games were originally scheduled for 14 January 1979.

Tie	Home team (tier)	Score	Away team (tier)	Att.
1	Bracknell	1–3	Aylesbury Harlequins	
2	Cope Chat	?–?	Llanedeyrn	
3	EMGALS	4–2	Coventry Bantams	
4	Friends of Fulham	2–1	Shoreline	
5	Havant	0–3	Waterlooville	
6	Hull Brewery	0–1	Bronte	
7	Macclesfield	?–?	Fodens	
8	Millwall Lionesses	3–4	Maidstone Mote United	
9	Notts Rangers	3–2	Kilnhurst	
10	Plymouth Pilgrims	4–2	Torbay United	
11	Romford	0–6	Lowestoft	
12	Romsonian	0–16	Southampton	
13	Spurs	2–3	Queens Park Rangers	
14	St Helens	?–?	Preston North End	
15	Tiverton	2–2 (a.e.t.)	Warminster Wanderers	
replay	Warminster Wanderers	4–2	Tiverton	
16	Watford	4–1	Luton	

== Fourth round proper ==
All games were originally scheduled for 11 February 1979.

Tie	Home team (tier)	Score	Away team (tier)	Att.
1	Bronte	?–?	Queens Park Rangers	
2	Fodens	2–7	Southampton	
3	Friends of Fulham	?–?	Aylesbury Harlequins	
4	Maidstone Mote United	1–3	Lowestoft	
5	Notts Rangers	?–?	Cope Chat	
6	St Helens	?–?	Waterlooville	
7	Warminster Wanderers	?–?	EMGALS	
8	Watford	?–?	Plymouth Pilgrims	

== Quarter–finals ==
All games were played on 5 March 1979.

Tie	Home team (tier)	Score	Away team (tier)	Att.
1	Aylesbury Harlequins	4–2	Warminster Wanderers	
Aylesbury fielded an ineligible player and a replay was ordered.
replay	Warminster Wanderers	1–0	Aylesbury Harlequins	
2	Lowestoft	3–1	Queens Park Rangers	
3	Notts Rangers	4–2	Plymouth Pilgrims	
4	Southampton	6–4 (a.e.t.)	St Helens	

== Semi–finals ==
All games were played on 1 April 1979.

Tie	Home team (tier)	Score	Away team (tier)	Att.
1	Notts Rangers	1–4	Southampton	
2	Warminster Wanderers	2–3	Lowestoft	

== Final ==
6 May 1979
15:00 BST

Southampton	1–0	Lowestoft
Chapman 6'	Report

Jubilee Park, Waterlooville
Attendance: 1,200
Referee: A. Robinson
