= Pat Davies (footballer) =

English footballer (born c. 1955)

Personal information
- Date of birth: c. 1955
- Place of birth: Netley, England
- Height: 5 ft 0 in (1.52 m)
- Position: Striker

Senior career*
Years	Team	Apps	(Gls)
- Southampton Women's F.C.

International career
1972-1975	England	8	(8)
- * Club domestic league appearances and goals

Pat Davies (born c. 1955) is an English former footballer who played as a striker for England and Southampton WFC. She played in England's first ever fixture against Scotland on 18 November 1972 at Ravenscraig Stadium, a match which England won 3–2.

== Career ==
Davies won six WFA Cups with Southampton and scored seven goals in finals. She scored a hat-trick for Southampton Women's F.C. in their 4–1 victory over Stewarton Thistle in the final of the first ever Women's FA Cup in 1971, which was held at Crystal Palace National Sports Centre. She won the competition again in 1972 and 1973 but finished runner-up in 1974 when Southampton lost to Fodens, despite Davies scoring with a left footed strike. Davies was also on target in both the 1975 and 1976 finals as her team won successive titles against Warminster and QPR respectively. Her goal in 1976 has the distinction of being the first ever extra time goal scored in a WFA Cup final. QPR gained revenge in 1977 but Southampton thrashed them 8–2 in the 1978 final at Wexham Park in Slough, with Davies becoming the first women to score in five different finals.

Davies is from Netley and despite being only 5 ft 0 in (1.52 m) tall, she was a prolific striker for Southampton WFC and England. She retired from playing in 1978 after becoming disillusioned with the lack of development in English women's football.

Davies scored twice against France at Stade Brion in April 1973 which was England's second ever international. She was allotted 9 when the FA announced their legacy numbers scheme to honour the 50th anniversary of England's inaugural international.

== Honours ==
Southampton

- FA Women's Cup: 1970–71, 1971–72, 1972–73, 1974–75, 1975–76, 1977–78
