= Westthorn United L.F.C. =

Scottish women's football club

Westthorn United Ladies Football Club was an early women's football team in Scotland.

The team was founded in 1967 by women working at Gay's biscuit factory in Glasgow. It was initially known as the Glasgow Gay Ladies, or Glasgow Gay Eleven. It soon moved training to Cambuslang, where it trained on the pitch at the Hoover factory, alongside the Cambuslang Hooverettes. The team's next move was to the Westthorn Recreation Ground in the East End of Glasgow, and this led it to adopt the "Westthorn United" name.

In 1968, the team were founder members of the first women's league in Glasgow. The following year, it entered the Butlin's Cup, beating Stewarton Thistle to win the Scottish side of the tournament. As a result, it played Fodens Ladies F.C., the English winners, in the first match for many years between women's teams from the two nations.

In 1970, the team was one of six founder members of the Scottish Women's Football Association, and it competed in the Scottish Women's Football League from its first season. 1972/73 proved its most successful season, as it won the league, the Scottish Women's Cup and the first Scottish Women's Football League Cup. It also reached the final of the Women's FA Cup, losing 2–0 to Southampton Women's F.C. 1973/74 was less successful, with the team reaching the final of the Scottish Women's Cup, but losing to Motherwell AEI.

At the end of the 1973/74 season, the team's two top players, Edna Neillis and Rose Reilly, both moved overseas to turn professional. The team continued playing in the top division until at least 1976/77, but dissolved before the end of the decade.
