= Warminster L.F.C. =

Warminster Ladies Football Club was a prominent football team based in Wiltshire, in England.

In about 1970, the Warminster Carnival Committee organised a women's football match as a fundraising activity. The success of the match led to the establishment of a permanent team, Warminster L.F.C. Eileen Foreman became the team's most prominent player, and her father Reg became the team's manager.

The team were soon founding members of the Western League, winning both the league and the league cup for many years. In 1974/75, they reached the final of the Women's FA Cup. Foreman scored two goals, including the first penalty scored in the cup finals, but the team lost 4-2 to Southampton Women's F.C.

The team disbanded in the 1980s, and are not directly connected to Warminster Town W.F.C.
