= Women's Football Association =

Governing body of women's football in England, 1969–1993

UEFA
- Founded: 1 November 1969
- Folded: 1993
- Location: England

The Women's Football Association (WFA) was the governing body of women's football in England. It was formed in 1969 and was disbanded in 1993, as responsibility for overseeing all aspects of the game of women's football in England passed to the Football Association.

== History ==
On 1 November 1969, representatives of 44 clubs attended the inaugural meeting at Caxton Hall in London. Six months later seven regional Leagues were represented at the first AGM. Pat Dunn was initially elected chair of the newly formed Women's Football Association (WFA) but her tenure was short: she was rapidly asked to resign in favour of a man, Pat Gwynne, who was preferred by the FA. Dunn did however serve as vice-chair from 1969 to 1971, and 1972–3.

The first secretary was Arthur Hobbs, who was one of the founding members of the Women's Football Association; he had to leave up the post in 1972 due to poor health; he was succeeded by Patricia Gregory (1972–1982). In 1971, under pressure from UEFA, the FA rescinded its ban on women playing football on the pitches of its member clubs. Also that year the WFA held the first national knock out cup; the Mitre Trophy, which became the FA Women's Cup. The following year the WFA launched an official England national team, who beat Scotland 3–2 in Greenock.

In 1983 the WFA affiliated to the FA on the same basis as the County Football Associations. A 24-club National League was established by the WFA in 1991.

In June 1993 the WFA ceased to exist when power was transferred to the FA. The 1993–94 FA Women's Cup was the first to be run under direct control of the FA, while the league structure was taken over and re–branded in 1994–95. It was intended that the resources and experience of the FA would capitalise on increased participation levels and arrest a decline in fortunes for the women's national team.

The FA's subsequent performance did not meet with universal approval. Linda Whitehead, the WFA's secretary for 13 years prior to the switchover, said of the FA, "A lot of people felt very bitter. It wasn't what they wanted to do, it was the way they did it – they just rode roughshod all over us." In December 1994 Arsenal Ladies manager Vic Akers lamented, "They [the FA] have been in charge 18 months now and they talk about a development plan. But I haven't heard a single word yet about what they actually intend to do."

A 2006 Department for Culture, Media and Sport report into women's football concluded that the FA had been largely successful in developing and promoting the women's game in England. Sue Lopez noted that prior to 1993 the WFA provided only "scant support" and that participation levels had stagnated between 1976 and 1991. Jean Williams reported that the WFA had been a "pretty leaky umbrella", particularly after 1985 when a lack of resources was compounded by infighting. Kelly Simmons, the FA's director of women's football, stated that "the WFA did a brilliant job as a voluntary organisation, but the amount of human and financial resources the FA could put behind women's football was a major change".

== Founder clubs ==
A list of the 44 founder clubs present at the first WFA AGM:

- Arland (Luton)
- Bantam Ladies (Coventry)
- Bedworth Rangers (Warwickshire)
- Boreham Wood (Hertfordshire)
- Bosom Buddies Utd (Essex)
- Brighton G.P.O. (Sussex)
- Chiltern Valley (Luton)
- Cycle and General (London)
- Deal and Betteshanger Utd. (Kent)
- Dundalk W.F.C. (Ireland)
- Edgware (London)
- Farley Utd. (Luton)
- Gillingham (Kent)
- Hamstreet (Kent)
- Harlesden Athletic (London)
- Hartwell (Northamptonshire)
- Hellingly Hospital (Sussex)
- Hull Ladies (Yorkshire)
- Kays Ladies (Worcester)
- Keresley (Coventry)
- L'Oreal Golden Ladies (Bedfordshire)
- Lan-Bar L.F.C. (Warwickshire)
- Leicester City (Leicestershire)
- Macclesfield (Cheshire)
- Manchester Corinthians L.F.C. (Lancashire)
- Manchester Nomads (Lancashire)
- Medway Ladies (Kent)
- Nuneaton Wanderers (Warwickshire)
- Patstone (Southampton)
- Rainbow Dazzlers (Burton-on-Trent)
- Ramsgate (Kent)
- Rapide L.F.C. (Worcestershire)
- Real Ladies (Southampton)
- Reckitts (Hull)
- Romford (Essex)
- Rye (Sussex)
- Spurs Ladies (London)
- Spurs Supporters (London)
- Swindon Spitfires (Wiltshire)
- Talon Elite (Luton)
- Thanet Utd (Kent)
- White Ribbon (London)
- Wilton Dynamos (Hampshire)
- Yardley Hastings (Kent)

== Legacy ==
The Women's Football Association Archive is housed at the British Library. The papers can be accessed through the British Library catalogue, although many are embargoed until 2084.

== See also ==
- Women's football in England
