= Lowestoft Ladies F.C. =

Lowestoft Ladies
- Full name: Lowestoft Ladies Football Club
- Nickname(s): The Waves
- Founded: 1971
- Dissolved: 1983
- Ground: Crown Meadow, Lowestoft

Lowestoft Ladies Football Club was a football club based in Lowestoft, Suffolk, England. One of the top clubs in the country during the late 1970s and early 1980s, they won the WFA Cup in 1981–82, but folded less than a year later after the league they played in was discontinued. Nicknamed 'The Waves', the club played at Lowestoft Town's Crown Meadow ground.

== History ==
During Lowestoft's participation in It's a Knockout in 1970, competitors from the town's team began playing football together. The female players asked the team's organiser Geoff Frost to form a women's football team, which was established the following year. Under Frost and later Joe Annis, the club won the East Anglian League three seasons in a row, before moving up to the South East of England League. Julia Manning became the club's first player to be called up to the England squad in 1972.

Lowestoft became one of the top teams in the country, featuring several current or future England internationals, including Debbie Bampton, Linda Curl, Vicky Johnson, Maureen Martin (captain from 1976 and 1981), Angela Poppy and Jackie Slack. A September 1976 match saw Lowestoft beat West Ham 27–0, with 14-year old Curl scoring 14 goals. They won the South East of England league title in three consecutive seasons, and in 1978–79 reached the final of the WFA Cup, losing 1–0 to Southampton. Three years later they reached the final again under manager Stewart Reynolds, this time beating Cleveland Spartans 2–0 at Loftus Road with goals from Curl and Poppy.

However, shortly after the club won the cup, the South East Regional League folded. After the club were rejected by five other leagues due to Lowestoft's location as the most easterly point of England, they were offered a place back in the East Anglian League but turned it down due to the difference in standard with their potential opposition. Most of the first team players subsequently left the club and in their first competitive match in the 1982–83 WFA Cup, fielded reserves and youth players as young as 12, losing 7–0. The club soon folded, less than twelve months after winning the cup. Five of the club's former players would go on to feature in Norwich Ladies' 1985–86 WFA Cup winning side, which was managed by former Lowestoft player Maureen Martin. They were Curl, Johnson, Slack, Kate Purdom and Sallie Jackson.

A new Lowestoft Ladies club was established in 1995 but ceased to exist the following year. Another reincarnation as Lowestoft Town Ladies was founded in 2005, but folded in 2017 due to lack of players.

== Honours ==
- WFA Cup
  - Winners 1981–82
- East Anglian League
  - Champions 1972–73, 1973–74, 1974–75
- South East of England League
  - Champions 1975–76, 1976–77, 1977–78, 1978–79

== See also ==
- Lowestoft Ladies F.C. players
