= Queen's Park Rangers L.F.C. (1969) =

English women's football team, founded 1969

Queen's Park Rangers L.F.C
- Full name: Queen's Park Rangers Ladies Football Club
- Founded: 1969

Queen's Park Rangers Ladies Football Club was a leading women's football team in England. Founded in 1969, they reached three consecutive WFA Cup finals, winning in 1977, before folding in the late 70's.

== History ==
The club was founded in 1969, and in 1970 joined the new Home Counties League. In 1975/76, they reached the final of the Women's FA Cup, losing 2-1 to Southampton Women's F.C. after extra time in Bedford. Paddy McGroarty scored the team's goal, and it was the first time highlights of the match were shown on BBC1. In 1976/77, they again played Southampton in the cup final, and on this occasion, defeated them 1-0. They became the first London team to take the trophy, with Carrie Staley scoring the winner at Champion Hill, home to Dulwich Hamlet F.C. QPR Goalkeeper Pat Napier was voted player of the match. The 1977–78 WFA Cup saw them again reach the final against Southampton, but suffer an 8-2 defeat with Sandra Choat and Staley scoring at Wexham Park, Slough. The team dissolved before the end of the decade.

A new Queen's Park Rangers Women's Football Club was later established, which in 2001 merged into a new Queen's Park Rangers L.F.C.
