= Southampton Women's F.C. =

Southampton Women's Football Club
- Nickname: The Sirens
- Founded: 1970; 56 years ago as Southampton Women's FC
- Chairman: Aaron Smith
- Manager: Jamie Lloyd Davies
- League: Southern Regional Women's Football League Premier Division
- 2024–25: FA Women's National League Division One South West, 12th of 12 (relegated)
- Website: http://www.southamptonwomensfc.co.uk/
Home colours	Away colours

Southampton Women's FC is a women's football club based in Hampshire, England. The club competes in the FA Women's National League and is an FA Charter Standard club.

Founded in 1970, Southampton Women's FC is the most successful women's football club in Southampton, and one of the most successful women's football teams of the 1970s. They won the Women's FA Cup eight times between the 1970–71 and 1980–81 seasons, and twice runners-up. Although founded by fans of the local men's professional club, the club is not affiliated to the men's club Southampton F.C., which operates its own women's team founded more recently, Southampton F.C. Women.

== History ==
Founded in 1970 by fans of the Southampton F.C. men's team, Southampton Women's FC became the first WFA Cup (Women's FA Cup) winners in 1971, winning the Final against Stewarton Thistle.

Southampton reached every WFA Cup Final in the competition's first nine seasons. They won the first three and won again in 1975, 1976, 1978, 1979 and 1981, with defeats in 1974 and 1977. Southampton is the city's most successful women's football club. They are eight-time winners of the Women's FA Cup, second only to Arsenal with 14 titles to their name.

Southampton returned to form, with the first team winning the Southern Region Women's Football League and League Cup in 2016–17. They gained promotion to the 4th-tier FA Women's Premier League (now National League), whilst the Reserves were unbeaten in the Hampshire County Women's League and won promotion to the Southern Region Women's Football League.

On 3 July 2023, the club announced Aaron Smith's departure as manager. Less than one week later, former Swindon Town manager, Jamie Lloyd Davies was announced as his replacement for the 2023–24 season.

== Former players ==
Pat Davies scored two of England's three goals in their victory over Scotland in 1972, as well as three of Southampton's goals in their 4–1 victory in the first Women's FA Cup final in 1971.

== Honours ==
- WFA Cup (Women's FA Cup)
  - Winners: (8) 1970–71 WFA Cup, 1971–72 WFA Cup, 1972–73 WFA Cup, 1974–75 WFA Cup, 1975–76 WFA Cup, 1977–78 WFA Cup, 1978–79 WFA Cup, 1980–81 WFA Cup
  - Runners-up: (2) 1973–74 WFA Cup, 1976–77 WFA Cup
- Southern Region Women's Football League
  - Winners: 2016–17
- Southern Region Women's Football League Cup
  - Winners: 2016–17
- Hampshire County Women's Football League
  - Winners: 2015–16
- Southampton Divisional FA Cup
  - Winners: 2023
  - Runners-up: 2022
