= 1995–96 in English football =

Football in England
- Season: 1995–96

Men's football
- FA Premier League: Manchester United
- First Division: Sunderland
- Second Division: Swindon Town
- Third Division: Preston North End
- Football Conference: Stevenage Borough
- FA Cup: Manchester United
- Football League Trophy: Rotherham United
- League Cup: Aston Villa
- Charity Shield: Everton

Women's football
- Premier League National Division: Croydon
- Premier League Northern Division: Tranmere Rovers
- Premier League Southern Division: Southampton Saints
- FA Women's Cup: Croydon
- Premier League Cup: Wembley

The 1995–96 season was the 116th season of competitive football in England.

== Overview ==
=== Premiership ===
Newcastle United were at one stage twelve points clear of Manchester United at the top of the table, but Alex Ferguson's relatively young and inexperienced side overhauled them during the second half of the season to win the title. Manchester United were England's entrants for the Champions League, while Newcastle United were joined in the UEFA Cup by Liverpool, the League Cup winners Aston Villa and Arsenal.

The teams relegated were Manchester City, Queens Park Rangers and Bolton Wanderers.

=== Division One ===
Sunderland and Derby County returned to the Premiership after a five-year exile, joined by Division One play-off winners Leicester City.

Watford and Luton Town, who had both been established top division sides a decade earlier, were relegated to the league's third tier. On the last day of the season they were joined by Millwall, who had been top of the division five months earlier but slumped dramatically after Mick McCarthy's departure for the Republic of Ireland manager's job.

=== Division Two ===
Swindon Town after two consecutive relegations returned to Division One at the first attempt after lifting the Division Two championship trophy. They were joined by runners-up Oxford United, who were enjoying their first successful season since the mid-1980s, and playoff winners Bradford City.

Going down were Carlisle United, Swansea City (who got through five managers in a season), Brighton & Hove Albion (sinking further into a financial crisis) and Hull City.

=== Division Three ===
Preston North End, Gillingham, Bury and playoff winners Plymouth Argyle won promotion to Division Two. Preston's win made them the third club to win all four top tiers of English football, next to Wolverhampton Wanderers and Burnley.

Torquay United finished at the bottom of Division Three, having won just five games all season, but were saved from demotion because Conference champions Stevenage Borough did not meet the league's required minimum stadium capacity.

== Successful managers ==
Alex Ferguson guided Manchester United to a unique second double of the league title and FA Cup.

Brian Little guided Aston Villa to victory in the League Cup as well as a fourth-place finish in the Premiership.

Peter Reid brought some long-awaited success to Sunderland as they finished champions of Division One and won promotion to the Premiership.

Experienced manager Jim Smith achieved another managerial success by winning promotion to the Premiership with Derby County.

Martin O'Neill achieved his third promotion in four seasons by winning promotion to the Premiership with Leicester City.

Steve McMahon succeeded in getting Swindon Town back into Division One at the first attempt as they were crowned champions of Division Two.

Denis Smith built on the success he achieved earlier in his career (with York City and later Sunderland) by gaining promotion to Division One with Oxford United.

Gary Peters had a dream start to his reign as Preston North End manager as they were crowned champions of Division Three.

Stan Ternent finally enjoyed some success in his long management and coaching career by winning promotion to Division Two with Bury.

Neil Warnock achieved the fifth promotion of his managerial career (and his fourth via the playoffs) by winning the Division Three playoffs with Plymouth Argyle.

Chris Kamara got Bradford City promoted via the Division 2 playoffs just 6 months after taking over as manager. The feat was all the more amazing considering they lost 0–2 at home to Blackpool in the 1st leg of the play off semi final. A 3–0 victory in the 2nd leg saw Bradford City reach Wembley for the first ever time defeating Notts County 2–0 in the final with goals from 19-year-old local boy Des Hamilton and Kamara's first signing Mark Stallard.

Tony Pulis guided Gillingham F.C. out of Division Three and was named the Manager of the Season.

== Successful players ==
Alan Shearer topped the Premiership scoring charts with 31 goals, the highest number of goals in the league charted at the time. Shearer was followed closely by Robbie Fowler on 28, Ian Wright and Les Ferdinand, who won the PFA Players' Player of the Year award.

Steve McManaman led the assists chart with 15 assists this season, also a new record for the league.

Eric Cantona was awarded the FWA Footballer of the Year for his comeback and galvanising influence over a successful young Manchester United side.

== Events ==
=== Double delight for United ===
Manchester United made history as the first English club to win the double of the league title and FA Cup twice. They did so despite having sold key players Paul Ince, Mark Hughes and Andrei Kanchelskis before the start of the season. Manager Alex Ferguson selected young players like Paul Scholes, Nicky Butt, David Beckham, Gary Neville and Phil Neville, alongside more experienced players Steve Bruce, Gary Pallister and Eric Cantona. Cantona, who returned from his suspension to spearhead United's chase for trophies, was voted the FWA Footballer of the Year.

At Christmas, United trailed Newcastle United by 12 points. On 27 December they beat Newcastle 2–0 to cut the gap to seven points, and a 1–0 win at St. James' Park on 4 March cut the gap to a single point. A 1–0 win against Tottenham Hotspur on 24 March put United on top of the Premiership and they remained in that position for the rest of the season. On the final day of the season they confirmed their status as Premiership champions for the third time in four seasons thanks to a 3–0 away win over Middlesbrough, who were managed by former United captain Bryan Robson.

On 11 May, United faced Liverpool in the FA Cup final at Wembley. A late goal from Cantona saw United make history and lift the FA Cup as England's first 'double double' winners.

=== Venables out, Hoddle in ===
Terry Venables announced in January that he would not be continuing as England manager after the 1996 European Championships, so the FA began their hunt for his successor. The likes of Alex Ferguson, Howard Kendall, Steve Coppell, Gerry Francis and Kevin Keegan were all linked with the job, but all quickly ruled themselves out either because of club commitments or a lack of experience.

In the end, the 39-year-old Chelsea manager Glenn Hoddle agreed to take charge of the England team on a four-year contract. Hoddle's successor at Chelsea was the 33-year-old Dutch legend Ruud Gullit.

=== Euro '96: So close for England ===
In 1996 England hosted the European Championships for the first time. They went through to the quarter-finals after drawing with Switzerland and beating Scotland and the Netherlands in the group stages. They drew 0–0 with Spain in the quarter finals but England went through on penalties. A goal by Alan Shearer gave them an early lead over Germany in the semi-finals, but the Germans forced extra-time and England lost the ensuing penalty shoot-out. Germany went on to beat Czech Republic 2–1 in the final.

=== European competitions ===
English clubs endured a tough time in European competition during the 1995–96 season. Manchester United, Liverpool and Leeds United suffered early exits from the UEFA Cup, while Blackburn Rovers were eliminated from the Champions League at the group stages and Everton were dumped out of the Cup Winners Cup in the Second Round. That left Nottingham Forest as the only English club still in Europe after Christmas.

Forest took on Bayern Munich in the UEFA Cup quarter-finals and lost 2–1 away in the first leg. Jürgen Klinsmann scored twice as the German side defeated Forest 5–1 at the City ground and went on to win the competition.

=== Bosman ruling ===
A legal challenge in the European Court of Human Rights by the Belgian midfielder Jean-Marc Bosman gave out-of-contract players aged 23 or above the right to become free agents and move to other clubs for no fee. There was widespread controversy following the announcement, as many clubs feared that they would lose expensively signed players for nothing. The Bosman ruling also saw an end to the three foreigner rule which restricted teams to fielding a maximum of three players born outside the country that they were employed in. In the Premiership, the limit of three foreigners in a match squad had covered Welsh, Scottish and Northern and Southern Irish players. The Bosman ruling allowed clubs in EU countries to field an unlimited number of players who were of EU nationalities, although they were still restricted to fielding 3 players of non-EU nationalities.

== Honours ==
| Competition | Winner |
|---|---|
| FA Premier League | Manchester United (10/3*) |
| FA Cup | Manchester United (9*) |
| Football League Cup | Aston Villa (5) |
| Football League First Division | Sunderland |
| Football League Second Division | Swindon Town |
| Football League Third Division | Preston North End |
| FA Community Shield | Everton |

== England national team ==
As England was hosting the 1996 UEFA European Football Championship the England national team did not play any competitive fixtures up until the championships themselves but played a number of friendlies this season.

| Date | Opposition | Venue | Result |
|---|---|---|---|
| 6 September 1995 | Colombia | Wembley Stadium, London | D 0-0 |
| 11 October 1995 | Norway | Ullevaal Stadion, Oslo | D 0-0 |
| 15 November 1995 | Switzerland | Wembley Stadium, London | W 3-1 |
| 12 December 1995 | Portugal | Wembley Stadium, London | D 1-1 |
| 27 March 1996 | Bulgaria | Wembley Stadium, London | W 1-0 |
| 24 April 1996 | Croatia | Wembley Stadium, London | D 0-0 |
| 18 May 1996 | Hungary | Wembley Stadium, London | W 3-0 |
| 23 May 1996 | China | Workers Stadium, Beijing | W 3-0 |

== League tables ==
=== Premiership ===
Manchester United were Premiership champions for the third time in four seasons, after Newcastle United led for most of the season, the Tyneside club's lead having peaked at 10 points just before Christmas. Manchester United also won the FA Cup to complete the double. The star of their season was undoubtedly striker Eric Cantona, who returned from his eight-month suspension at the beginning of October to spearhead United's attack with 19 goals in all competitions, several of them in crucial late season games as they took the initiative in the title race, and the last being the winning goal in the FA Cup final.

Liverpool continued to show signs of a return to their former glory by finishing third and ending the season as runners-up in the FA Cup final. Aston Villa, enjoying a revival with a reshaped squad under Brian Little, finished fourth and won the Football League Cup. Arsenal built the foundations for a revival under new manager Bruce Rioch by finishing fifth and coming within a goal of reaching the League Cup final. However, Rioch was gone by the start of the following season after a dispute with the club's directors.

FA Cup holders Everton failed to retain the cup and finished in sixth place in the league one place outside of a UEFA Cup place.

Blackburn Rovers failed to retain their league title and finished seventh in the league, with Alan Shearer finding the net more than 30 times for the third season in a row.

Nottingham Forest finished ninth in the league and were the only English side to progress to the quarter-finals of any of the European competitions, doing so in reaching the quarter-final UEFA Cup. 1995-96 was one of the worst seasons ever for English clubs in European competitions.

Bolton Wanderers were relegated in bottom place, having won just twice before New Year's Day, with not even an improvement under caretaker manager Colin Todd helping them. Queens Park Rangers were unable to recover from the sale of star striker Les Ferdinand to Newcastle and finished second bottom, ending 13 seasons in the top division. Manchester City were the last team to be relegated, eventually undone by their failure to win in their first 11 matches, but they did manage to take the fight to the last day of the season. Coventry City and Southampton stayed up on goal difference.

| Pos | Team | Pld | W | D | L | GF | GA | GD | Pts | Qualification or relegation |
|---|---|---|---|---|---|---|---|---|---|---|
| 1 | Manchester United (C) | 38 | 25 | 7 | 6 | 73 | 35 | +38 | 82 | Qualification for the Champions League group stage |
| 2 | Newcastle United | 38 | 24 | 6 | 8 | 66 | 37 | +29 | 78 | Qualification for the UEFA Cup first round |
| 3 | Liverpool | 38 | 20 | 11 | 7 | 70 | 34 | +36 | 71 | Qualification for the Cup Winners' Cup first round (Note: Liverpool qualified for the Cup Winners' Cup as FA Cup runners-up, as winners Manchester United already qualified for the Champions League. They defaulted their UEFA Cup spot from league position to Arsenal.) |
| 4 | Aston Villa | 38 | 18 | 9 | 11 | 52 | 35 | +17 | 63 | Qualification for the UEFA Cup first round |
| 5 | Arsenal | 38 | 17 | 12 | 9 | 49 | 32 | +17 | 63 | Qualification for the UEFA Cup first round |
| 6 | Everton | 38 | 17 | 10 | 11 | 64 | 44 | +20 | 61 | Excluded from the UEFA Cup (Note: The Football Association was initially awarded a UEFA Fair Play berth to the Premier League's highest-placed team not qualified for Europe, but was revoked by UEFA for its clubs fielding under-strength sides in the 1995 UEFA Intertoto Cup.) |
| 7 | Blackburn Rovers | 38 | 18 | 7 | 13 | 61 | 47 | +14 | 61 | |
| 8 | Tottenham Hotspur | 38 | 16 | 13 | 9 | 50 | 38 | +12 | 61 | |
| 9 | Nottingham Forest | 38 | 15 | 13 | 10 | 50 | 54 | −4 | 58 | |
| 10 | West Ham United | 38 | 14 | 9 | 15 | 43 | 52 | −9 | 51 | |
| 11 | Chelsea | 38 | 12 | 14 | 12 | 46 | 44 | +2 | 50 | |
| 12 | Middlesbrough | 38 | 11 | 10 | 17 | 35 | 50 | −15 | 43 | |
| 13 | Leeds United | 38 | 12 | 7 | 19 | 40 | 57 | −17 | 43 | |
| 14 | Wimbledon | 38 | 10 | 11 | 17 | 55 | 70 | −15 | 41 | |
| 15 | Sheffield Wednesday | 38 | 10 | 10 | 18 | 48 | 61 | −13 | 40 | |
| 16 | Coventry City | 38 | 8 | 14 | 16 | 42 | 60 | −18 | 38 | |
| 17 | Southampton | 38 | 9 | 11 | 18 | 34 | 52 | −18 | 38 | |
| 18 | Manchester City (R) | 38 | 9 | 11 | 18 | 33 | 58 | −25 | 38 | Relegation to Football League First Division |
| 19 | Queens Park Rangers (R) | 38 | 9 | 6 | 23 | 38 | 57 | −19 | 33 | Relegation to Football League First Division |
| 20 | Bolton Wanderers (R) | 38 | 8 | 5 | 25 | 39 | 71 | −32 | 29 | Relegation to Football League First Division |

Source: Premier League
Rules for classification: 1) points; 2) goal difference; 3) number of goals scored.
(C) Champions; (R) Relegated
Notes:

Leading goalscorer: Alan Shearer (Blackburn Rovers) - 31

=== Division One ===
Sunderland gave their best performance in years by clinching the Division One title, and were joined among the elite by runners-up Derby County and play-off winners Leicester City. Crystal Palace conceded a last-minute Leicester winner at Wembley, and would have gone up automatically had it not been for their dismal first half of the season.

Luton Town, Watford and Millwall, who had all played in the top flight at some stage in the last nine seasons, went down to Division Two. Millwall had been top of the league five months before going down on the final day of the season, a 6–0 defeat at Sunderland signalling a dramatic decline in their fortunes.

Oldham Athletic narrowly avoided a second relegation in three seasons, while Wolverhampton Wanderers finished 20th and the last safe place was secured by Portsmouth. Norwich City and Birmingham City finished in the bottom half of the table after both enjoying spells at the top during the first half of the season. West Bromwich Albion finished 12th after a dramatic season where they had looked like promotion contenders in the autumn, before enduring a 14-match winless run where they picked up just one point and dropped into the relegation zone.

| Pos | Team | Pld | W | D | L | GF | GA | GD | Pts | Qualification or relegation |
|---|---|---|---|---|---|---|---|---|---|---|
| 1 | Sunderland (C, P) | 46 | 22 | 17 | 7 | 59 | 33 | +26 | 83 | Promotion to the Premier League |
| 2 | Derby County (P) | 46 | 21 | 16 | 9 | 71 | 51 | +20 | 79 | Promotion to the Premier League |
| 3 | Crystal Palace | 46 | 20 | 15 | 11 | 67 | 48 | +19 | 75 | Qualification for the First Division play-offs |
| 4 | Stoke City | 46 | 20 | 13 | 13 | 60 | 49 | +11 | 73 | Qualification for the First Division play-offs |
| 5 | Leicester City (O, P) | 46 | 19 | 14 | 13 | 66 | 60 | +6 | 71 | Qualification for the First Division play-offs |
| 6 | Charlton Athletic | 46 | 17 | 20 | 9 | 57 | 45 | +12 | 71 | Qualification for the First Division play-offs |
| 7 | Ipswich Town | 46 | 19 | 12 | 15 | 79 | 69 | +10 | 69 | |
| 8 | Huddersfield Town | 46 | 17 | 12 | 17 | 61 | 58 | +3 | 63 | |
| 9 | Sheffield United | 46 | 16 | 14 | 16 | 57 | 54 | +3 | 62 | |
| 10 | Barnsley | 46 | 14 | 18 | 14 | 60 | 66 | −6 | 60 | |
| 11 | West Bromwich Albion | 46 | 16 | 12 | 18 | 60 | 68 | −8 | 60 | |
| 12 | Port Vale | 46 | 15 | 15 | 16 | 59 | 66 | −7 | 60 | |
| 13 | Tranmere Rovers | 46 | 14 | 17 | 15 | 64 | 60 | +4 | 59 | |
| 14 | Southend United | 46 | 15 | 14 | 17 | 52 | 61 | −9 | 59 | |
| 15 | Birmingham City | 46 | 15 | 13 | 18 | 61 | 64 | −3 | 58 | |
| 16 | Norwich City | 46 | 14 | 15 | 17 | 59 | 55 | +4 | 57 | |
| 17 | Grimsby Town | 46 | 14 | 14 | 18 | 55 | 69 | −14 | 56 | |
| 18 | Oldham Athletic | 46 | 14 | 14 | 18 | 54 | 50 | +4 | 56 | |
| 19 | Reading | 46 | 13 | 17 | 16 | 54 | 63 | −9 | 56 | |
| 20 | Wolverhampton Wanderers | 46 | 13 | 16 | 17 | 56 | 62 | −6 | 55 | |
| 21 | Portsmouth | 46 | 13 | 13 | 20 | 61 | 69 | −8 | 52 | |
| 22 | Millwall (R) | 46 | 13 | 13 | 20 | 43 | 63 | −20 | 52 | Relegation to the Second Division |
| 23 | Watford (R) | 46 | 10 | 18 | 18 | 62 | 70 | −8 | 48 | Relegation to the Second Division |
| 24 | Luton Town (R) | 46 | 11 | 12 | 23 | 40 | 64 | −24 | 45 | Relegation to the Second Division |

Rules for classification: 1) Points; 2) Goals scored; 3) Goal difference
(C) Champions; (O) Play-off winners; (P) Promoted; (R) Relegated

Leading goalscorer: John Aldridge (Tranmere Rovers) - 27

=== Division Two ===
Swindon Town secured an immediate return to Division One by winning the Division Two title. They were joined by local rivals and runners-up Oxford United, while the final promotion place went to playoff winners Bradford City whose Wembley glory gave Chris Kamara a dream start in management.

Blackpool, who missed out on automatic promotion by one place, attained their highest league finish for more than 20 years but a playoff semi-final failure cost them a place in Division One and cost Sam Allardyce his job. Crewe Alexandra were defeated in the playoffs for the second season running, while beaten finalists Notts County had been relegated the season before.

Carlisle United, Swansea City, Brighton & Hove Albion and Hull City were relegated to Division Three. York City, who made headlines by knocking Manchester United out of the League Cup early in the season, avoided relegation by three points after beating Brighton in their delayed final fixture of the season, sending Carlisle down.

| Pos | Team | Pld | W | D | L | GF | GA | GD | Pts | Promotion or relegation |
|---|---|---|---|---|---|---|---|---|---|---|
| 1 | Swindon Town (C, P) | 46 | 25 | 17 | 4 | 71 | 34 | +37 | 92 | Promotion to the First Division |
| 2 | Oxford United (P) | 46 | 24 | 11 | 11 | 76 | 39 | +37 | 83 | Promotion to the First Division |
| 3 | Blackpool | 46 | 23 | 13 | 10 | 67 | 40 | +27 | 82 | Qualification for the Second Division play-offs |
| 4 | Notts County | 46 | 21 | 15 | 10 | 63 | 39 | +24 | 78 | Qualification for the Second Division play-offs |
| 5 | Crewe Alexandra | 46 | 22 | 7 | 17 | 77 | 60 | +17 | 73 | Qualification for the Second Division play-offs |
| 6 | Bradford City (O, P) | 46 | 22 | 7 | 17 | 71 | 69 | +2 | 73 | Qualification for the Second Division play-offs |
| 7 | Chesterfield | 46 | 20 | 12 | 14 | 56 | 51 | +5 | 72 | |
| 8 | Wrexham | 46 | 18 | 16 | 12 | 76 | 55 | +21 | 70 | |
| 9 | Stockport County | 46 | 19 | 13 | 14 | 61 | 47 | +14 | 70 | |
| 10 | Bristol Rovers | 46 | 20 | 10 | 16 | 57 | 60 | −3 | 70 | |
| 11 | Walsall | 46 | 19 | 12 | 15 | 60 | 45 | +15 | 69 | |
| 12 | Wycombe Wanderers | 46 | 15 | 15 | 16 | 63 | 59 | +4 | 60 | |
| 13 | Bristol City | 46 | 15 | 15 | 16 | 55 | 60 | −5 | 60 | |
| 14 | Bournemouth | 46 | 16 | 10 | 20 | 51 | 70 | −19 | 58 | |
| 15 | Brentford | 46 | 15 | 13 | 18 | 43 | 49 | −6 | 58 | |
| 16 | Rotherham United | 46 | 14 | 14 | 18 | 54 | 62 | −8 | 56 | |
| 17 | Burnley | 46 | 14 | 13 | 19 | 56 | 68 | −12 | 55 | |
| 18 | Shrewsbury Town | 46 | 13 | 14 | 19 | 58 | 70 | −12 | 53 | |
| 19 | Peterborough United | 46 | 13 | 13 | 20 | 59 | 66 | −7 | 52 | |
| 20 | York City | 46 | 13 | 13 | 20 | 58 | 73 | −15 | 52 | |
| 21 | Carlisle United (R) | 46 | 12 | 13 | 21 | 57 | 72 | −15 | 49 | Relegation to the Third Division |
| 22 | Swansea City (R) | 46 | 11 | 14 | 21 | 43 | 79 | −36 | 47 | Relegation to the Third Division |
| 23 | Brighton & Hove Albion (R) | 46 | 10 | 10 | 26 | 46 | 69 | −23 | 40 | Relegation to the Third Division |
| 24 | Hull City (R) | 46 | 5 | 16 | 25 | 36 | 78 | −42 | 31 | Relegation to the Third Division |

(C) Champions; (O) Play-off winners; (P) Promoted; (R) Relegated

Leading goalscorer: Marcus Stewart (Bristol Rovers) - 21

=== Division Three ===
Preston North End got on the right path towards better days by sealing the Division Three title, making them the third club to finish top of all four professional divisions of English football. Joining them in Division Two were runners-up Gillingham (after seven years in the league's basement division), third placed Bury and playoff winners Plymouth Argyle.

Torquay United finished at the bottom of the league by quite a margin, but avoided relegation because Conference champions Stevenage Borough did not meet the required Football League stadium capacity standards. Scarborough endured another torrid season, finishing second from bottom in the league for the second season in succession.

Lincoln City climbed up to 18th place under John Beck, who took over in October after the club had propped up the Football League. Fulham suffered the lowest finish of their history by finishing 17th, and weeks before the end of the season they appointed Micky Adams as player-manager in hope that the former Coventry and Southampton defender could revive the club after a decade of decline. Cambridge United finished 16th in the table, a mere four years after narrowly missing out on promotion to the inaugural Premier League.

| Pos | Team | Pld | W | D | L | GF | GA | GD | Pts | Promotion |
|---|---|---|---|---|---|---|---|---|---|---|
| 1 | Preston North End (C, P) | 46 | 23 | 17 | 6 | 78 | 38 | +40 | 86 | Promotion to the Second Division |
| 2 | Gillingham (P) | 46 | 22 | 17 | 7 | 49 | 20 | +29 | 83 | Promotion to the Second Division |
| 3 | Bury (P) | 46 | 22 | 13 | 11 | 66 | 48 | +18 | 79 | Promotion to the Second Division |
| 4 | Plymouth Argyle (O, P) | 46 | 22 | 12 | 12 | 68 | 49 | +19 | 78 | Qualification for the Third Division play-offs |
| 5 | Darlington | 46 | 20 | 18 | 8 | 60 | 42 | +18 | 78 | Qualification for the Third Division play-offs |
| 6 | Hereford United | 46 | 20 | 14 | 12 | 65 | 47 | +18 | 74 | Qualification for the Third Division play-offs |
| 7 | Colchester United | 46 | 18 | 18 | 10 | 61 | 51 | +10 | 72 | Qualification for the Third Division play-offs |
| 8 | Barnet | 46 | 18 | 16 | 12 | 65 | 45 | +20 | 70 | |
| 9 | Chester City | 46 | 18 | 16 | 12 | 72 | 53 | +19 | 70 | |
| 10 | Wigan Athletic | 46 | 20 | 10 | 16 | 62 | 56 | +6 | 70 | |
| 11 | Northampton Town | 46 | 18 | 13 | 15 | 51 | 44 | +7 | 67 | |
| 12 | Scunthorpe United | 46 | 15 | 15 | 16 | 67 | 61 | +6 | 60 | |
| 13 | Doncaster Rovers | 46 | 16 | 11 | 19 | 49 | 60 | −11 | 59 | |
| 14 | Exeter City | 46 | 13 | 18 | 15 | 46 | 53 | −7 | 57 | |
| 15 | Rochdale | 46 | 14 | 13 | 19 | 57 | 61 | −4 | 55 | |
| 16 | Cambridge United | 46 | 14 | 12 | 20 | 61 | 71 | −10 | 54 | |
| 17 | Fulham | 46 | 12 | 17 | 17 | 57 | 63 | −6 | 53 | |
| 18 | Mansfield Town | 46 | 11 | 20 | 15 | 54 | 64 | −10 | 53 | |
| 19 | Lincoln City | 46 | 13 | 14 | 19 | 57 | 73 | −16 | 53 | |
| 20 | Hartlepool United | 46 | 12 | 13 | 21 | 47 | 67 | −20 | 49 | |
| 21 | Leyton Orient | 46 | 12 | 11 | 23 | 44 | 63 | −19 | 47 | |
| 22 | Cardiff City | 46 | 11 | 12 | 23 | 41 | 64 | −23 | 45 | |
| 23 | Scarborough | 46 | 8 | 16 | 22 | 39 | 69 | −30 | 40 | |
| 24 | Torquay United | 46 | 5 | 14 | 27 | 30 | 84 | −54 | 29 | Reprived from relegation |

(C) Champions; (O) Play-off winners; (P) Promoted

Leading goalscorers: Steve White (Hereford United) - 30

== Diary of the season ==
1 July 1995: Nottingham Forest pay £2.5 million for Sheffield Wednesday midfielder Chris Bart-Williams, the day after they sold striker Stan Collymore to Liverpool for a national-record £8.5 million. Collymore's successor is Kevin Campbell, a £2.8million signing from Arsenal.

3 July 1995: Alan Ball is appointed the new manager of Manchester City after 18 months as manager of Southampton.

5 July 1995: Aston Villa sign Leicester City midfielder Mark Draper for £3.25 million.

6 July 1995: Newcastle United sign French winger David Ginola from Paris St Germain for £2.5 million and striker Les Ferdinand from Queens Park Rangers for a club record fee of £6 million.

10 July 1995: England midfielder Paul Gascoigne returns to Britain after three years in Italy with Lazio when he completes a £4.3million move to Scottish champions Rangers.

12 July 1995: George Graham is banned from football worldwide for a year for accepting illegal payments, which had resulted in his sacking as Arsenal manager five months ago.

14 July 1995: Arsenal sign England captain David Platt from Sampdoria for £4.75million. Platt is now the world's costliest players, with his career transfer fees now totalling more than £22million.

17 July 1995: Mike Naylor, chairman and founder of the sponsors of the Football League, Endsleigh Insurance, dies in a car crash in France.

19 July 1995: Sheffield Wednesday sign Belgian midfielder Marc Degryse from Anderlecht for £1.5 million.

24 July 1995: Southampton goalkeeper Bruce Grobbelaar, Wimbledon goalkeeper Hans Segers and former Wimbledon and Aston Villa striker John Fashanu are charged with match-fixing and bribery.

26 July 1995: Queens Park Rangers sign Australia national football team captain Ned Zelic from Borussia Dortmund of Germany for £1.25million.

1 August 1995: Everton sign Derby County defender Craig Short for £2.4 million.

3 August 1995: Coventry City sign winger John Salako from Crystal Palace for £1.5 million.

5 August 1995: Middlesbrough prepare for their return to the Premier League by paying a club-record £5.25 million for Tottenham forward Nick Barmby.

8 August 1995: Eric Cantona announces his intention to leave English football, but Manchester United refused to terminate his contract.

10 August 1995: Cantona announces his intention to stay with Manchester United after a meeting with Alex Ferguson in Paris. Newcastle United sign Reading goalkeeper Shaka Hislop for £1.575 million.

12 August 1995: The Football League season begins. Relegated Crystal Palace begin their bid for an immediate return to the Premier League with a dramatic 4–3 home win over Barnsley. Oldham, who went down a year earlier, start the season well with a 3–0 home win over newly promoted Huddersfield. Portsmouth beat Southend 4–2 at Fratton Park.

13 August 1995: A Vinny Samways goal gives Everton a 1–0 win over Blackburn in the FA Charity Shield. Norwich City begin their quest for an immediate return to the Premier League by beating Luton Town 3–1 at Kenilworth Road.

16 August 1995: Andrea Silenzi becomes first Italian to play for a Premier League side when he joins Nottingham Forest in a £1.8million move from Torino.

19 August 1995: The FA Premier League season begins with Manchester United defeated 3–1 at Aston Villa, which sparks immediate criticism throughout the media due to the number of young players in the team as well as the fact that United have sold three key players this summer and not made any major signings, Alan Hansen is known for coining the phrase "you can't win anything with kids". Blackburn Rovers begin their defence of the Premier League title with a 1–0 win at home over Queens Park Rangers. Matt Le Tissier scores a hat-trick for Southampton at The Dell but they lost 4–3 to Nottingham Forest. Newcastle United beat Coventry City 3–0 at home, with record signing Les Ferdinand scoring on his debut. Bolton Wanderers lose 3–2 to Wimbledon at Selhurst Park in their first top flight game since May 1980.

20 August 1995: Middlesbrough's Nick Barmby scores on his debut, a 1–1 draw against Arsenal at Highbury.

23 August 1995: Manchester United bounce back from their opening day defeat with a 2–1 home win over West Ham United.

24 August 1995: Everton complete their club record £5 million signing of Manchester United winger Andrei Kanchelskis, more than a month after their offer for Kanchelskis was first accepted.

26 August 1995: Middlesbrough defeat Chelsea 2–0 in their first game at the new Riverside Stadium, with Craig Hignett scoring the stadium's first goal. Manchester United beat Wimbledon 3–1 at Old Trafford. Leeds are top of the league for the first time since their 1992 title triumph after a 2–0 home win over Aston Villa.

27 August 1995: Newcastle United go top of the Premier League with a 2–0 win at Sheffield Wednesday.

28 August 1995: Manchester United defeat Blackburn Rovers 2–1, despite being reduced to 10 men after Roy Keane was sent off for two bookable offences.

30 August 1995: Newcastle are the month-end leaders in the Premier League with a 1–0 home win over Middlesbrough, with second-placed Leeds being held to a 1–1 draw at Southampton.

2 September 1995: The upcoming international fixtures mean that there is no action in the Premier League this weekend, but it is business as usual in the Football League. Newly-promoted Birmingham City win 5–0 at Barnsley in Division One. Millwall go top of the table with a 1–0 win over Portsmouth at Fratton Park. Sheffield United's 3–1 defeat at West Bromwich Albion leaves them bottom of the table and still looking for their first point of the season after five games.

9 September 1995: In a rematch of last season's FA Cup Final, Manchester United defeat Everton 3–2. Lee Sharpe scores twice, and former United player Andrei Kanchelskis is taken off with a dislocated shoulder, ruling him out for the next few weeks. United are now level on points with leaders Newcastle, who lose 1–0 at Southampton. Wimbledon go third with a 1–0 home win over Liverpool. In Division One, Sheffield United pick up their first points of the season with a 2–1 home win over Norwich City.

11 September 1995: A London derby at Upton Park sees Chelsea beat West Ham 3–1.

16 September 1995: Newcastle United and Manchester United remain level on points at the top of the Premier League after both managing home victories. Aston Villa move into third place with a 2–0 home win over Wimbledon.

20 September 1995: York City defeat an under-strength Manchester United 3–0 in the League Cup second-round first leg at Old Trafford. This will ultimately prove to be the only home defeat all season in any competition for the hosts.

23 September 1995: Manchester United go top of the Premier League after drawing 0–0 at Sheffield Wednesday. Defending champions Blackburn snap out of a recent run of dismal form and defeat Coventry City 5–1 at Ewood Park with Alan Shearer scoring a hat-trick. Liverpool remain third after a 5–2 home win over Bolton. Tony Yeboah scored a hat-trick for Leeds in a 4–2 win at Wimbledon. Manchester City are bottom of the table with one point from their first seven games, losing 1–0 at home to Middlesbrough today.

24 September 1995: Newcastle go back to the top of the Premier League with a 2–0 home win over Chelsea.

26 September 1995: Manchester United are knocked out of the UEFA Cup on away goals after drawing 2–2 at home to Russian side Rotor Volgograd in the first round second leg, but still maintain their 39-year unbeaten run in European competitions following a late equaliser by goalkeeper Peter Schmeichel - the club's first goalkeeper to score a goal in any competitions since Alex Stepney in 1973.

30 September 1995: Manchester City's terrible start to the season continues with a 3–0 defeat at Nottingham Forest, which makes it one point from their first eight league games. Aston Villa go second with a 3–0 away win over their former manager Ron Atkinson's new club Coventry City.

1 October 1995: Eric Cantona returns from his eight-month suspension to score a late equaliser from the penalty spot in a 2–2 home draw with Liverpool. Newcastle extend their lead to four points with a 3–1 win at Everton.

3 October 1995: York City eliminate Manchester United from the League Cup despite their Premier League opponents winning 3–1 in the second round second leg at Bootham Crescent. Striker Paul Scholes scores twice, with United's other goal coming from teenage winger Terry Cooke, who only made his competitive debut last month.

11 October 1995: Everton striker Duncan Ferguson is sentenced to three months' imprisonment for assault for head butting Raith Rovers player John McStay 18 months ago, when he was still playing for Rangers. making him the first British professional footballer to be imprisoned for an on-field offence.

14 October 1995: 20-year-old striker Paul Scholes scores the only goal of the Manchester derby at Old Trafford, aiding United's title challenge and pushing City further into relegation trouble. Newcastle remain four points ahead at the top with a 3–2 win at QPR. Arsenal go third by beating Leeds 3–0 at Elland Road.

15 October 1995: Middlesbrough sign 22-year-old Brazilian midfielder Juninho in a £4.75million deal.

21 October 1995: Les Ferdinand scores a hat-trick in Newcastle's 6–1 home league win against Wimbledon, and Manchester United remain in second place with a 4–1 away victory over Chelsea. The gap remains four points wide. Middlesbrough‘s fine start to life back in the Premier League continues with a 1–0 home win over QPR keeping their hold on fourth place. Down in Division One, West Bromwich go second with a 2–1 home win over Portsmouth, sparking hope at The Hawthorns that Albion are close to ending their decade-long absence from the top flight.

28 October 1995: The Football Association announces that the 72 Football League clubs would receive an additional £21 million in television revenue after they failed to agree on an initial sum of nearly £120 million. Liverpool's Ian Rush scores twice in a 6–0 home league win against Manchester City, who are still without a win after 11 games, and Leeds United captain Gary McAllister scores a hat-trick in a 3–1 home league win over Coventry City. Millwall knock Leicester off the top of Division One with a 2–1 win over West Bromwich Albion, while Leicester lose 3–2 at home to Crystal Palace.

30 October 1995: Striker John McGinlay scores for struggling Bolton Wanderers in a surprise 1–0 home win against Arsenal.

4 November 1995: Manchester United lose 1–0 at Arsenal with an early goal from Dennis Bergkamp, their first Premier League defeat since the opening day of the season, and Newcastle extend their lead to five points with a 2–1 home win over Liverpool, with Steve Howey scoring a late winner. Manchester City finally win a Premier League at the 12th attempt, being fellow strugglers Bolton 1–0 at Maine Road. In Division One, Sheffield United climb off the bottom of the table and out of the bottom three with a 4–1 home win over Portsmouth. Tranmere beat Derby 5-1 and Stoke beat Luton 5–0.

6 November 1995: Nottingham Forest go third in the Premier League with a 4–1 win over Wimbledon, who remain fourth from bottom.

8 November 1995: Chelsea sign Romanian defender Dan Petrescu from Sheffield Wednesday for a club record fee of £2.3million.

10 November 1995: The FA withdraws its £118.5-million television deal with Football League clubs after they failed to meet a deadline.

11 November 1995: In the FA Cup's first round, Shrewsbury Town defeat Northern Premier League side Marine by a club-record 11-2 and Division Two crisis club Swansea City lose 7–0 to Division Three side Fulham. Division Two's Bradford City are made to work hard for a 4–3 win over non-league Burton Albion. Hitchin Town, another non-league side, eliminate Bristol Rovers with a 2–1 win. Dorchester Town lose 9–1 to Oxford United.

13 November 1995: Former England manager Graham Taylor resigns after 20 months managing Wolverhampton Wanderers, who began the season as Division One promotion favourites but have fallen to 17th. His final game in charge, a televised home match against 10-man Charlton Athletic in the league, ended in a goalless draw.

17 November 1995: Kenny Dalglish, director of football at Blackburn Rovers since June after guiding them to the Premier League title, is reported to be in the running to be the new Wolves manager.

18 November 1995: Alan Shearer scores a hat-trick for Blackburn in their 7–0 home win over Nottingham Forest, while leaders Newcastle are held to a 1–1 draw at Aston Villa, enabling Manchester United to cut the gap at the top to six points (and having the advantage of a game in hand) with their 4–1 home win over Southampton.

22 November 1995: Manchester United beat Coventry City 4–0 at Highfield Road to cut the gap at the top to three points and sent their opponents to the bottom of the Premier League table. Bolton miss the chance to climb out of the bottom three as they lose 3–2 at Chelsea. Manchester City's slow improvement continues with a 1–0 win over Wimbledon at Maine Road.

24 November 1995: Leeds United pay a club record £4.5million for Parma's Swedish striker Tomas Brolin. Everton striker Duncan Ferguson is released from prison after serving 44 days of his three-month sentence for assault.

25 November 1995: 34-year-old defender Steve Nicol returns to the Premier League less than a year after leaving Liverpool for a Notts County side now in Division Two, signing for Sheffield Wednesday. Newcastle United remain in the driving seat at the top of the Premier League with a 2–1 home win over Leeds. Coventry and Wimbledon both grind out a point in the battle for Premier League survival with a thrilling 3–3 draw at Highfield Road.

27 November 1995: The Football League signs a five-year television-coverage deal worth £125 million with BSkyB. Manchester United are held to a 1–1 draw with Nottingham Forest at the City Ground, with Eric Cantona converting a penalty to equalise in the second half after the home side took the lead. They have now played as many games as leaders Newcastle but are still five points behind.

2 December 1995: Alan Shearer scores a hat-trick in Blackburn's 4–2 home win against West Ham United, and Manchester United are held to a 1–1 home draw by Chelsea, meaning that Newcastle could be on the verge of a seven-point lead at the top of the Premier League.

3 December 1995: Newcastle are held to a 3–3 draw at Wimbledon, limiting their lead at the top of the table to five points. Sunderland overtake Millwall at the top of Division One with a 1–0 win over Crystal Palace at Roker Park.

4 December 1995: Coventry striker Dion Dublin finds himself in the unusual situation of scoring a hat-trick for the losing side when the Sky Blues lose 4–3 to Sheffield Wednesday at Hillsborough in the Premier League. Coventry are bottom of the table, having won just one of their first 16 Premier League games.

7 December 1995: Mark McGhee leaves Division One promotion challengers Leicester City after a year in charge to become manager of Wolves.

9 December 1995: Defending Premier League champions Blackburn Rovers are beaten 5–0 at Coventry, and in Division One Sunderland beat Millall 6–0 to maintain their lead of the table with a 6–0 win at Roker Park. Manchester United drop two points when they are held to a 2–2 draw at home to Sheffield Wednesday in the Premier League, but leaders Newcastle drop all three points when they lose 1–0 at Chelsea, meaning that their lead is cut to four points when a victory would have put them seven points ahead.

10 December 1995: Having fallen into the bottom three yesterday when other results went against them, Wolves climb three places in Division One when a 3–2 win at Luton ends their six-match winless run in the league.

12 December 1995: Dave Bassett, the fifth-longest-serving manager in the English league, resigns as manager of Division One's Sheffield United after nearly eight years in charge. Walsall beat Torquay United 8–4 in the FA Cup second-round replay at Bescot Stadium which followed a 1–1 draw in the first match at Plainmoor 10 days ago.

13 December 1995: Former Everton manager Howard Kendall is named the new manager of Sheffield United.

15 December 1995: QPR sell misfits defender Ned Zelic to Eintracht Frankfurt for £1million.

16 December 1995: Blackburn Rovers left back Graeme Le Saux fractures his ankle in a 1–0 home win against Middlesbrough in the FA Premier League, an injury which is set to rule him out of action until next season. Newcastle United go seven points ahead in the Premier League with a 1–0 victory over Everton, and Aston Villa striker Savo Milosevic scores a hat-trick in Villa's 4–1 home win against Coventry City. Yorkshire rivals Sheffield Wednesday and Leeds United clash at Hillsborough, with the hosts winning a thrilling match 6–2. Bolton remain bottom of the table after losing 2–1 at QPR, who climb out of the bottom three.

17 December 1995: Manchester United remain seven points behind Newcastle after losing 2–0 at Liverpool, with Robbie Fowler scoring both of Liverpool's goals. A series of saves from Peter Schmeichel prevent United from suffering a considerably heavier defeat.

21 December 1995: Martin O'Neill resigns after six months as Norwich manager to take over at Leicester City, and Division One bottom club Luton Town replace Terry Westley with Bradford City's Lennie Lawrence. England World Cup winner Jack Charlton resigns after nearly 10 years as manager of the Republic of Ireland national football team, following the nation's failure to qualify for Euro 96.

22 December 1995: Bolton Wanderers, the bottom club in the Premier League, pay a club-record £1.2 million for Sheffield United striker Nathan Blake.

23 December 1995: Coventry City defeat Everton 2–1 at home. Robbie Fowler scores a hat-trick for Liverpool at home against Arsenal for the second season running in a 3–1 win. Newcastle United extend their lead to 10 points with a 3–1 win over Nottingham Forest. Middlesbrough go fifth with a 4–2 home win over West Ham. Derby go top of Division One with a 2–1 home win over Sunderland, who fall into second place.

24 December 1995: Newcastle remain 10 points ahead as their nearest rivals, Manchester United, lose 3–1 at Leeds United. The top two will meet in three days time for a showdown at Old Trafford.

26 December 1995: A Boxing Day London derby at Highbury sees Arsenal beat QPR 3–0 to send the hosts fifth in the Premier League and leave the hosts fourth from bottom.

27 December 1995: Manchester United cut the lead in the FA Premier League to seven points with a 2–0 home win against Newcastle with goals from Andy Cole and Roy Keane. The only other league action of the day sees Leeds keep their bid for a second successive UEFA Cup campaign on track with a 2–0 win over Bolton at Burnden Park.

30 December 1995: Manchester United reduce Newcastle's lead to four points with a 2–1 win against struggling Queens Park Rangers. Alan Shearer scores his 100th goal for Blackburn in a 2–1 home win against Tottenham.

1 January 1996: Manchester United suffer their heaviest Premier League defeat yet when they lose 4–1 to Tottenham at White Hart Lane. They are still four points behind Newcastle, but Kevin Keegan's team have two games in hand. Liverpool muscle in on the top two with a 4–2 home win over Nottingham Forest. Bolton remain rooted to the bottom of the table with a 4–2 defeat at Sheffield Wednesday.

2 January 1996: Roy McFarland is sacked as co-manager of Bolton Wanderers, with Colin Todd being put in sole charge. Newcastle United regain a seven-point by defeating Arsenal 2–0 at home.

6 January 1996: Ian Rush breaks Denis Law's FA Cup goal-scoring record with two goals for Liverpool in their 7–0 win over Rochdale in the third round. An 80th-minute goal by Eric Cantona forces a 2–2 draw for Manchester United against Sunderland at Old Trafford, taking the tie to a replay at Roker Park, in what could potentially be the old stadium's final FA Cup game, as Sunderland's new stadium at Monkwearmouth is expected to be completed in 18 months time.

10 January 1996: Terry Venables announces that he will resign as England manager after Euro 96 to concentrate on clearing his name in a legal dispute with Alan Sugar over his June 1993 dismissal from Tottenham Hotspur.

13 January 1996: Manchester United's title hopes are hit hard when they drop two points at home to Aston Villa, who hold them to a goalless draw. Their neighbours City are pushed deeper into relegation trouble with a 1–0 defeat at Tottenham, who move into third place. Down in Division One, Huddersfield boost their hopes of a second successive promotion with a 1–0 win at struggling Watford lifting them into second place. The Black Country derby ends in a goalless draw at the Hawthorns, with both Wolves and Albion on the brink of the relegation zone.

14 January 1996: Newcastle are now nine points ahead with a game in hand at the top of the Premier League with a 1–0 win at Coventry. Charlton go second in Division One with a thrilling 4–3 away win over Birmingham, whose own promotion hopes are hit hard as a result.

15 January 1996: Bryan Robson, Middlesbrough manager and England assistant manager, is reportedly in line to succeed Terry Venables as England manager after Euro 96.

16 January 1996: Sunderland take the lead against Manchester United in the FA Cup third round replay at Roker Park before Nicky Butt equalises and Andy Cole scores a late winner to give Alex Ferguson's team a 2–1 win and a fourth round clash with Reading at Elm Park.

17 January 1996: In the FA Cup third round, Sheffield United eliminate Arsenal with a 1-0 replay win at Bramall Lane in which Carl Veart scores the winning goal.

20 January 1996: Neil Ruddock and Robbie Fowler score twice each in Liverpool's 5–0 home win over Leeds United in the league. Newcastle United beat Bolton Wanderers 2–1 to go 12 points clear at the top of the table, ahead of Liverpool and Manchester United.

22 January 1996: Despite being reduced to 10 men after Nicky Butt was sent off, Manchester United still manage a 1–0 win over West Ham at Upton Park (where they last won seven years ago) thanks to an Eric Cantona goal which cuts Newcastle's lead to nine points, although the Tynesiders still have a game in hand.

23 January 1996: Blackburn Rovers block a move by the Irish Football Association to appoint their director of football, Kenny Dalglish, as the national coach.

24 January 1996: Out-of-favour Liverpool striker Nigel Clough is sold to Manchester City for £1.5 million.

27 January 1996: Manchester United defeat Reading 3–0 in the FA Cup fourth round at Elm Park on a weekend where most league and cup fixtures are cancelled due to heavy snow.

31 January 1996: January ends with Newcastle United still ahead of Manchester United at the top of the Premier League by nine points, with a game in hand. Manchester United sign Manchester City goalkeeper Tony Coton for £500,000 as cover for Peter Schmeichel. Derby County are top of Division One, with Charlton Athletic second. West Bromwich Albion are in danger of relegation less than three months after being among the leading promotion contenders, a goal away from the bottom three.

3 February 1996: Eric Cantona returnsto Selhurst Park for the first time since his flying kick the previous year, scoring twice as Manchester United defeat Wimbledon 4–2 to keep their title hopes alive. Newcastle are still nine points ahead with a game in hand, beating Sheffield Wednesday 2–0 at home. Liverpool are confined to third place after a goalless draw at home to Tottenham. Aston Villa go fourth win a 3–0 home win over Leeds.

4 February 1996: Gavin Peacock scores a hat-trick in Chelsea's 5–0 win against Middlesbrough.

5 February 1996: Millwall manager Mick McCarthy is appointed manager of the Republic of Ireland team, some 18 months after the end of his playing career for the national side.

6 February 1996: Wolverhampton Wanderers reserve midfielder Jimmy Kelly, 22, is jailed for five years for manslaughter following his part in a fight outside a Liverpool hotel in September 1994, in which a 26-year-old man died.

8 February 1996: The Department of Employment denies work permits to Marc Hottiger (who agreed to move from Newcastle United to Everton) and Ilie Dumitrescu (who agreed to move from Tottenham Hotspur to West Ham). Both clubs are set to appeal the decisions. Crystal Palace, 16th in Division One, appoint Dave Bassett manager, ending Steve Coppell's brief second spell as manager.

10 February 1996: Newcastle United pay a club record £6.7million for Parma and Colombia striker Faustino Asprilla, on the same day that they beat Middlesbrough 2–1 at the Riverside Stadium. Manchester United keep up the pressure with a goal from Lee Sharpe and a series of spectacular saves from Peter Schmeichel giving them a 1–0 home win over Blackburn.

14 February 1996: Former Liverpool manager Bob Paisley dies at 77 after several years of suffering from Alzheimer's disease. Everton surrender their defence of the FA Cup with a fourth-round replay defeat by Port Vale.

17 February 1996: Middlesbrough lose 4–1 at home to a resurgent Bolton Wanderers, while QPR also give their survival hopes a boost with a 3–1 win at Sheffield Wednesday. In Division One, new Crystal Palace manager Dave Bassett oversees a 4–0 home win over bottom club Watford which gives his side's hopes of reaching the playoffs a major boost. In the FA Cup third round, a Manchester derby at Old Trafford sees City take an early lead through Uwe Rosler before Eric Cantona scores a quick equaliser from the penalty spot, with Lee Sharpe finally getting the winning goal for the hosts.

20 February 1996: Glenn Roeder is sacked after nearly three years as manager of Watford. Away from the Division One relegation battle, Crystal Palace home in on the playoff places with a 3–2 win at Tranmere, who are now in the bottom half of the table after spending much of the first half of the season in the top six.

21 February 1996: The title race takes an unexpected turn when Newcastle lose 2–0 at West Ham, allowing Manchester United to cut their lead to six points with a 2–0 home win over Everton, although Kevin Keegan's men still have a game in hand.

22 February 1996: Former Wolves and England manager Graham Taylor is appointed manager of Watford for the second time.

24 February 1996: Manchester City hold Newcastle United to a 3–3 draw at Maine Road, meaning that the Premier League leaders still have a seven-point lead over Manchester United but no longer have the advantage of a game in hand. Liverpool remain in contention for the title, beating Blackburn 3–2 at Ewood Park.

25 February 1996: Newcastle's lead is cut to four points when Manchester United beat Bolton Wanderers 6–0 at Burnden Park, which also gives Alex Ferguson's team a major boost to their goal difference.

28 February 1996: Swindon Town and Huddersfield Town, the last remaining non-Premier League teams in the FA Cup, are defeated in fifth-round replays. Liverpool announce that Ian Rush will be leaving on a free transfer at the end of the season.

2 March 1996: A much-changed Nottingham Forest team find their first away win since October with victory over Sheffield Wednesday. At the lower reaches of the table, Manchester City climb out of the relegation zone at the expense of Southampton, and bottom club Bolton win at Leeds to keep their survival hopes alive.

4 March 1996: Manchester United cut Newcastle United's lead to one point with a goal by Eric Cantona goal giving them a 1–0 win on Tyneside, following a series of thrilling saves by Peter Schmeichel.

5 March 1996: Arsenal's bid for a UEFA Cup place is bolstered with a 3–1 win over Manchester City at Highbury.

7 March 1996: Marc Hottiger and Ilie Dumitrescu receive work permits to complete their long-awaited transfers.

9 March 1996: Aston Villa boost their chances of making a late run to the title with a 4–2 home win over QPR, which deprives the visitors of vital points needed in their battle to avoid relegation.

11 March 1996: Manchester United remain in contention for a unique second double by defeating Southampton 2–0 in the FA Cup quarter-final at Old Trafford.

13 March 1996: Liverpool drop two points in their push for the title when they are held to a 2–2 draw at home to Wimbledon.

16 March 1996: Manchester United go top of the Premier League on goal difference, with a 1–1 away draw against Queens Park Rangers, Eric Cantona equalising after Denis Irwin scored an own goal.

18 March 1996: Newcastle regain their lead with a 3–0 home win against West Ham.

20 March 1996: An Eric Cantona goal from 25 yards puts Manchester United level on points at the top as they beat Arsenal 1–0 at Old Trafford.

23 March 1996: Arsenal aid Manchester United's title bid by defeating Newcastle United 2–0 at Highbury, sending Alex Ferguson's team back to the top on goal difference.

24 March 1996: Aston Villa beat Leeds United 3–0 in the League Cup final to equal Liverpool's record of five victories in the competition. Manchester United defeat Tottenham Hotspur 1-0 for a three-point lead over Newcastle. Eric Cantona scores the only goal of the game.

25 March 1996: To celebrate England's hosting of the European Championships, an edition of stamps commemorating five legends of the English game is released. After a public poll, Dixie Dean, Bobby Moore, Duncan Edwards, Billy Wright and Danny Blanchflower were selected.

28 March 1996: Manchester City sign Georgian striker Mikhail Kavelashvili from Alania Vladikavkaz for £1.4 million.

30 March 1996: Queens Park Rangers beat Southampton 3–0 at Loftus Road to keep their Premier League survival hopes alive. In the race for a UEFA Cup place, Andrei Kanchelskis scores twice as Everton beat Blackburn 3–0.

3 April 1996: Liverpool defeat Newcastle United 4–3 in a thrilling game where Robbie Fowler and Stan Collymore both scored twice for the hosts, helping keep Newcastle in second and boosting Manchester United's title bid, as well as boosting Liverpool's own slim title hopes.

5 April 1996: Middlesbrough move closer to survival and mid-table security with a 3–1 home win against Sheffield Wednesday, who are still in a precarious position.

6 April 1996: Manchester United retained their lead in the Premier League with a 3–2 win over City in the Manchester derby at Maine Road, putting the hosts deeper into relegation trouble.

8 April 1996: Coventry City defender David Busst sustains a compound leg fracture in the 1-0 Premier League defeat by Manchester United at Old Trafford. Busst is expected to be out of action for at least a year and may never be fully fit to play professional football again. United moved closer to the title with Newcastle's 2–1 defeat by Blackburn. Queens Park Rangers kept their survival bid alive by defeating Everton 3–1. Bolton Wanderers also kept their survival hopes alive by defeating Chelsea, 2–1.

12 April 1996: 37-year-old striker John Aldridge is appointed player-manager of Tranmere Rovers, succeeding John King, who steps down as manager after nine years.

13 April 1996: Mark Hughes scores his first hat-trick for Chelsea as they defeat Leeds United 4–1 at Stamford Bridge. His old club Manchester United lose 3–1 at Southampton but still have a six-point lead at the top of the Premier League, while the win is a big boost to Southampton's survival bid.

14 April 1996: Newcastle kept their title challenge alive by defeating Aston Villa 1–0, cutting Manchester United's lead to three points.

16 April 1996: The Merseyside derby at Goodison Park ended in a 1–1 draw, with Andrei Kanchelskis scoring for Everton and Robbie Fowler for Liverpool.

17 April 1996: Manchester United and Newcastle United won 1–0 at home (against Leeds United and Southampton, respectively), keeping Manchester's lead at three points. Roy Keane scores the only goal of the game against 10-man Leeds, whose goalkeeper Mark Beeney is sent off.

20 April 1996: Sunderland win promotion to the Premier League, ending their five-year absence from the top flight, meaning that the north-East's three top clubs will all be in the top flight for the first time since the 1970s.

22 April 1996: England midfielder Paul Gascoigne publicly asks Terry Venables to remain as national team manager.

25 April 1996: Bryan Robson agrees to remain as manager of Middlesbrough until at least the end of the 1999–2000 season, effectively ending speculation that he will take over as the England manager if Terry Venables follows through with his intention to resign this summer.

27 April 1996: Bolton Wanderers are relegated after one season in the Premier League, losing 1–0 at home to Southampton. Although Queens Park Rangers defeat West Ham United 3–0, it is too late to save their 13-year tenure in the top flight. Manchester City boost their survival bid with a 1–0 win over Aston Villa, as do Coventry City with a 2–0 win over Wimbledon.

28 April 1996: A 5–0 home win against Nottingham Forest moves Manchester United closer to their third league title in four seasons.

29 April 1996: The Football Association offer Chelsea manager Glenn Hoddle the England manager's job. Hoddle, in management since taking over at Swindon Town five years ago, took his first club into the Premier League in 1993 before taking over at Chelsea, guiding them to an FA Cup final and a European semi-final. Newcastle United defeat Leeds 1–0, with Newcastle manager Kevin Keegan ranting on live television against his opposite number at Manchester United, Alex Ferguson.

2 May 1996: Chelsea boss Glenn Hoddle agreed to a four-year contract as England manager after the European Football Championships. Former Manchester City chairman Peter Swales dies of a heart attack at 63. Newcastle United are held to a 1–1 draw at Nottingham Forest, helping leaders Manchester United move closer to the title.

5 May 1996: Manchester United clinched the Premier League title with a 3–0 away win against Middlesbrough on the season's final day, also clinching a place in the European Cup. Runners-up Newcastle, who have gone without winning a league title since 1927 and had a 12-point lead in January, are held to a 1–1 draw at Tottenham, who finish eighth and miss out on a UEFA Cup place. Liverpool finish third and draw 2–2 at Maine Road with Manchester City, who are relegated on goal difference, while Coventry and Southampton avoid the drop, both finishing the season with goalless draws. Liverpool will compete in next season's Cup Winners' Cup, while fourth placed Aston Villa and fifth placed Arsenal will join Newcastle in the UEFA Cup. Down in Division One, Millwall are relegated five months after being top of the table, going down on the final day with Watford, while Luton's relegation was confirmed before the final game. Champions Sunderland and runners-up Derby have already secured automatic promotion, while Crystal Palace, Stoke, Leicester and Charlton will contest the playoffs.

10 May 1996: Ruud Gullit accepted Chelsea's offer to become their player-manager, replacing Glenn Hoddle. Gullit, 33, is set become the youngest manager in the Premier League and one of the first foreign managers in the English game.

11 May 1996: Manchester United become the first English team to repeat the "double" when a late Eric Cantona goal gives them a 1–0 win over Liverpool in the FA Cup final.

14 May 1996: Middlesbrough agree to sign FC Porto's Brazilian midfielder Emerson for £4million.

18 May 1996: England beat Hungary 3–0 in a friendly witnessed by incoming Three Lions manager Glenn Hoddle and his second-in-command John Gorman. A Darren Anderton goal in each half coming either side of David Platt's 27th international goal.

19 May 1996: Ian Rush agrees to sign for Leeds United on a free transfer on 1 June, after spending 15 of the last 16 years with Liverpool.

20 May 1996: Glenn Hoddle agrees to play for Chelsea in a posthumous testimonial match for the former Swindon Town physio Kevin Morris.

24 May 1996: Gianluca Vialli agrees to sign for Chelsea on a free transfer from Juventus, who won the European Cup two days ago. Gary Speed agrees to join Everton from Leeds United for £3.5million.

27 May 1996: Although England's 22-man squad for Euro 96 has yet to be confirmed, it is reported that 35-year-old Newcastle United forward Peter Beardsley is no longer being considered for a place in the squad.

28 May 1996: Leicester City win promotion back to the Premier League with a 2–1 win against Crystal Palace at Wembley Stadium, with Steve Claridge scoring the winner during the final minute of extra time. England's Euro 96 squad is announced, but does not include Peter Beardsley, Ugo Ehiogu, Dennis Wise, Robert Lee and Jason Wilcox. Stuart Pearce, who is the oldest player in the England squad at 34, signs a three-year contract with Nottingham Forest.

8 June 1996: FIFA mandates licensing for all football agents involved in transfers. The Premier League announces that teams would be able to select five substitutes on the match squad (increased from three), although only three could be used, for the 1996–97 season.

26 June 1996: England bow out of Euro 96 in the semi-final when a Gareth Southgate penalty miss put them out after a 1–1 draw with Germany. Alan Shearer had put England ahead in the third minute before Stefan Kuntz equalised, and a German goal in extra time was disallowed before the whistle blew for 120 minutes. The defeat sparks a night of rioting in British towns and cities including London, Birmingham, Swindon, Bedford, Dunstable, Bradford and Solihull.

30 June 1996: Euro 96 is won by Germany, who defeat the Czech Republic 2–1 at Wembley despite the Czechs taking an early lead through a Patrik Berger penalty. Oliver Bierhoff scores both of Germany's goals.

== Women's football ==
=== Women's Premier League ===
==== National Division ====
| Pos | Team | Pld | W | D | L | GF | GA | GD | Pts | Qualification or relegation |
|---|---|---|---|---|---|---|---|---|---|---|
| 1 | Croydon (C) | 18 | 13 | 5 | 0 | 58 | 17 | +41 | 44 | |
| 2 | Doncaster Belles | 18 | 14 | 2 | 2 | 57 | 19 | +38 | 44 | |
| 3 | Arsenal | 18 | 11 | 4 | 3 | 54 | 12 | +42 | 37 | |
| 4 | Everton | 18 | 10 | 1 | 7 | 44 | 40 | +4 | 31 | |
| 5 | Liverpool | 18 | 9 | 2 | 7 | 36 | 27 | +9 | 29 | |
| 6 | Wembley | 18 | 7 | 5 | 6 | 43 | 21 | +22 | 26 | |
| 7 | Millwall Lionesses | 18 | 5 | 3 | 10 | 20 | 32 | −12 | 18 | |
| 8 | Ilkeston Town | 18 | 4 | 3 | 11 | 21 | 46 | −25 | 15 | |
| 9 | Villa Aztecs (R) | 18 | 4 | 1 | 13 | 22 | 51 | −29 | 13 | Relegation to the Northern Division |
| 10 | Wolverhampton Wanderers (R) | 18 | 0 | 0 | 18 | 8 | 98 | −90 | 0 | Relegation to the Northern Division |

Source: FA WPL
(C) Champions; (R) Relegated

==== Northern Division ====
| Pos | Team | Pld | W | D | L | GF | GA | GD | Pts | Promotion or relegation |
|---|---|---|---|---|---|---|---|---|---|---|
| 1 | Tranmere Rovers (C, P) | 16 | 14 | 2 | 0 | 73 | 11 | +62 | 44 | Promotion to the National Division |
| 2 | Huddersfield Town | 16 | 12 | 3 | 1 | 60 | 23 | +37 | 39 | |
| 3 | Garswood St Helens United | 16 | 9 | 4 | 3 | 51 | 23 | +28 | 31 | |
| 4 | Sheffield Wednesday | 16 | 9 | 3 | 4 | 41 | 22 | +19 | 30 | |
| 5 | Langford | 16 | 6 | 2 | 8 | 27 | 44 | −17 | 17 (Note: Langford 3 points deducted) | Moved to the Southern Division |
| 6 | RTM Newcastle Kestrels | 16 | 3 | 4 | 9 | 21 | 43 | −22 | 13 | |
| 7 | Notts County | 16 | 4 | 1 | 11 | 18 | 43 | −25 | 13 | |
| 8 | Kidderminster Harriers | 16 | 4 | 1 | 11 | 27 | 53 | −26 | 13 | |
| 9 | Bronte | 16 | 0 | 2 | 14 | 11 | 67 | −56 | 2 | |

Source: WPL
(C) Champions; (P) Promoted

==== Southern Division ====
| Pos | Team | Pld | W | D | L | GF | GA | GD | Pts | Promotion or relegation |
|---|---|---|---|---|---|---|---|---|---|---|
| 1 | Southampton Saints (C, P) | 18 | 13 | 2 | 3 | 52 | 21 | +31 | 41 | Promotion to the National Division |
| 2 | Berkhamsted Town | 18 | 13 | 1 | 4 | 42 | 26 | +16 | 40 | |
| 3 | Wimbledon | 18 | 12 | 1 | 5 | 53 | 36 | +17 | 37 | |
| 4 | Three Bridges | 18 | 11 | 1 | 6 | 45 | 23 | +22 | 34 | |
| 5 | Ipswich Town | 18 | 8 | 1 | 9 | 36 | 35 | +1 | 25 | |
| 6 | Brighton & Hove Albion | 18 | 5 | 4 | 9 | 34 | 45 | −11 | 19 | |
| 7 | Town & County | 18 | 6 | 1 | 11 | 27 | 48 | −21 | 19 | |
| 8 | Leyton Orient | 18 | 5 | 2 | 11 | 33 | 45 | −12 | 16 (Note: Leyton Orient 1 point deducted) | |
| 9 | Oxford United | 18 | 4 | 4 | 10 | 24 | 46 | −22 | 16 | |
| 10 | Brentford (R) | 18 | 3 | 3 | 12 | 29 | 50 | −21 | 12 | Relegation |

Source: FA WPL
(C) Champions; (P) Promoted; (R) Relegated

=== FA Women's Cup ===
==== Final ====
28 April 1996

| Liverpool | 1–1 (a.e.t.) | Croydon |
|---|---|---|
| Burke 22' | | Powell 38' |
Penalties
| Burke (penalty scored); Thomas (penalty missed); Handley (penalty missed); Duffy (penalty scored); Formston (penalty missed) | 3–2 | (penalty scored) Powell; (penalty missed) Proctor; (penalty scored) Sempare; (penalty scored) Mapes |

New Den
Attendance: 2,110
Referee: Scott Mathieson (Cheshire)

== Transfer deals ==
For subsequent transfer deals see 1996-97 in English football.

== Notable debutants ==
26 August 1995: Michael Brown, 18-year-old midfielder, makes his debut for Manchester City in a 1–0 defeat to QPR at Loftus Road in the Premier League.

13 January 1996: Ian Harte, 18-year-old left-back, makes his debut as a substitute in a 2–0 home win for Leeds United against West Ham United in the Premier League.

31 January 1996: Frank Lampard, 17-year-old midfielder, makes his debut for West Ham United—where his father Frank Lampard made over 650 appearances—in their 3–2 home win over Coventry City in the Premier League.

30 March 1996: Harry Kewell, 18-year-old Australian winger, makes his debut for Leeds United against Middlesbrough in the Premier League.

5 May 1996: Rio Ferdinand, 18-year-old central defender, makes his debut for West Ham United in their 1–1 home draw with Sheffield Wednesday on the final day of the Premier League season.

== Retirements ==
19 July 1995: Alan Smith, 32-year-old Arsenal striker who helped them win five major trophies since joining them in 1987, retires after failing to recover from an ankle injury.

10 October 1995: Clive Allen, 34-year-old striker, retires after being given a free transfer by Carlisle United after playing just three games for them in Division Two. His best days came at Tottenham Hotspur, where he scored 49 goals in all competitions in the 1986–87 season and was voted PFA Player of the Year.

16 October 1995: David O'Leary, 37-year-old Leeds United defender, retires due to an Achilles injury after 18 months out of action.

11 November 1995: Jimmy Case, 41-year-old Brighton & Hove Albion player-manager, announces his retirement from playing. Case, who is best known for his time at Liverpool and Southampton, was the oldest outfield player registered in the English Football League or Premier League.

11 November 1995: Simon Webster, 31-year-old West Ham United defender, retires after failing to recover from a broken leg suffered in a training ground collision with Julian Dicks.

4 January 1996: Paul Lake, 27-year-old Manchester City midfielder, retires after failing to recover from a succession of knee injuries which had seen him out of action for more than three years and play just six times in as many seasons. He underwent numerous operations to try to regain full fitness, but was unsuccessful.

== Deaths ==
- July 1995 – John Marshall, 16, England Youth international who died suddenly from a heart defect just before he was due to sign an apprenticeship with Everton.
- 13 July 1995 – Garth Butler, 72, played 134 games at full-back for Port Vale after the end of World War II, before an ankle injury halted his career in 1951.
- August 1995 – Dennis Allen, 56, was a former player of Charlton Athletic, Reading and Portsmouth. He was a member of a strong footballing family, being the father of Martin Allen, the brother of Les Allen, and the uncle of Paul Allen, Clive Allen and Bradley Allen.
- 23 August 1995 – Johnny Carey, 76, former Manchester United defender and Republic of Ireland international. Won the league in 1952, and the FA Cup in 1948. Later managed a number of clubs, including Blackburn Rovers, Everton, Leyton Orient and Nottingham Forest.
- 14 September 1995 – Harold Shepherdson, 76, longtime assistant coach for the England national team, a role he held during England's 1966 World Cup victory.
- 21 September 1995 – Michael Millett, 17, Wigan Athletic defender, died in a car crash one day before his 18th birthday. Had played three times for his club and was tipped by many to reach the highest level.
- 25 September 1995 – Dave Bowen, 67, former Arsenal and Northampton Town defender, who won 19 caps for Wales and represented his country at the 1958 World Cup. Later became Northampton's most successful manager of all time, guiding the Cobblers from the fourth to the first division in four seasons.
- 28 September 1995 – Albert Johanneson, 55, South African winger who played for Leeds United during the 1960s and played in their first league championship winning team in 1969. Moved to York City a year later. Died alone at his tower block flat in Leeds.
- 23 October 1995 – James Mangham, 88, one of the oldest surviving league players, played twice in goal in the Third Division North for Nelson in the late 1920s.
- 30 October 1995 – William "Taffy" Davies, 85, played 284 league games on the wing for Watford between 1930 and 1950, his career being disrupted by World War II. His only international recognition for Wales came in 1944 when he played for the wartime national side.
- 25 November 1995 – Alan Nicholls, 22, former Plymouth Argyle goalkeeper, was killed in a motorcycle crash near Peterborough which also claimed the life of the motorcyclist whose motorcycle he was a passenger on. At the time of his death, was playing for Stalybridge Celtic in the Conference after a brief spell at Gillingham.
- 14 December 1995 – Eddie Clamp, 61, played 214 times at wing-half for Wolverhampton Wanderers between 1953 and 1961, during which time the club won three league titles and an FA Cup. Was capped four times for England. Signed for Arsenal in 1961, later playing for Stoke City before playing his last senior game in 1965 for Peterborough United.
- 29 December 1995 – Harry Cripps, 54, played 400 league games in Millwall's defence between 1961 and 1974, during which time Millwall enjoyed a 59-match unbeaten run at home at reached the Second Division with two successive promotions. Finished his career at Charlton Athletic, later serving the South London side as a coach, before moving into management with non-league Barking and then back in the Football League at Southend United.
- 11 January 1996 – Bobby Cowell, 73, spent his entire playing career at Newcastle United, making 289 appearances in the league as a defender between 1946 and 1955, winning three FA Cups before his career was ended by injury.
- 13 January 1996 – Bobby Langton, 77, former Blackburn Rovers and Preston North End left-winger who also won 11 caps for England.
- 16 January 1996 – Harry Potts, 75, former Burnley player and manager. Played 165 league games for the Charets between 1946 and 1950, and was appointed manager in 1958, a post he held until 1970, winning the 1959-60 league championship. He also had a second spell as Burnley manager between 1977 and 1979.
- 16 January 1996 – Dai Ward, 61, former Bristol Rovers, Cardiff City, Watford and Brentford striker who made over 300 appearances in the Football League, averaging just over a goal every other game, and won two caps for Wales.
- 9 February 1996 – Neil Franklin, 74, an outstanding centre-half with Stoke City, winning 27 England caps. In 1950, he agreed to join Santa Fé of the non-FIFA sanctioned Colombian league where he would allegedly receive "ten times his English wages", but returned to England disillusioned and never played top-flight football again.
- 14 February 1996 – Bob Paisley, 77, former Liverpool manager who won a total of 21 trophies (including six league titles and three European Cups) between 1974 and 1983. He had previously been employed by the club as a player and later as a coach. After retiring, he remained at the club as a director and later president. At the time of his death he was still the most successful manager in English football.
- 8 March 1996 – Alan Brown, 81, played 148 games as a centre-half for Huddersfield Town, Burnley and Notts County between 1933 and 1949. Later coached at Sheffield Wednesday before managing Burnley and Sunderland before returning to Sheffield Wednesday as manager, then managing Sunderland again before his managerial career ended in dismissal in November 1972, six months before his Roker Park successor Bob Stokoe guided the club to FA Cup glory.
- 16 March 1996 – Dennis Jennings, 85, became Birmingham City's oldest player when he made his final appearance for them in May 1950 just before his 40th birthday, the last of 192 league appearances for the club he had first joined in 1936, having previously played for Huddersfield Town and Grimsby Town.
- 1 May 1996 – Eric Houghton, 85, managed Aston Villa to a then record seventh FA Cup triumph in 1957, having served as a player for two decades after signing for them in 1927, scoring more than 200 goals in all competitions. He was also capped seven times by England. Houghton was the great-uncle of former England goalkeeper Chris Woods.
- 2 May 1996 – Peter Swales, 63, who was chairman of Manchester City from 1973 to 1993, died after suffering a heart attack.
- 15 June 1996 – Allenby Chilton, 77, was centre-half in Manchester United's FA Cup winning side of 1948 and league champions of 1952, playing a total of nearly 400 games for the club between 1938 and 1955, when he transferred to Grimsby Town to become player-manager after losing his place in Matt Busby's team to Mark Jones, who went on to lose his life in the Munich crash of 1958. Chilton was capped twice by England in the early 1950s.
