= 1995–96 FA Women's Cup =

Tournament details
- Country: England & Wales

Final positions
- Champions: Croydon
- Runners-up: Liverpool
- Penalty shoot-outs do not count towards the total number of goals.

The 1995–96 FA Women's Cup was an association football knockout tournament for women's teams, held between 10 September 1995 and 28 April 1996. It was the 26th season of the FA Women's Cup and was won by Croydon, who defeated Liverpool in the final.

The tournament consisted of one preliminary round and eight rounds of competition proper.

All match results and dates from the Women's FA Cup Website.

== Preliminary round ==
All games were scheduled for 10 September 1995.

Tie	Home team (tier)	Score	Away team (tier)	Att.
1	Blackpool Wren Rovers	0–4	Scunthorpe Ironesses	
2	Chesham United	2–5	Thames Valley	
3	Deans	0–4	Runcorn	
4	Drayton Wanderers	0–4	Chelsea	
5	Dulwich Hamlet	8–1	Hackney	
6	Hereford United	1–5	Cable–Tel (Newport)	
7	Hull City	4–2	Blackburn Rangers	
8	Manchester Rangers	A–W	Winsford United	
Walkover for Winsford United
9	Royal Strikers	A–W	Lowestoft Town	
Walkover for Lowestoft Town
10	Sherborne	12–0	Tuffley Athletic	
11	West Ham United	5–0	Great Wakering Rovers	

== First round proper ==
All games were scheduled for 17 September 1995.

Tie	Home team (tier)	Score	Away team (tier)	Att.
1	Accrington Stanley	1–2	Doncaster Rovers	
2	Amble Town	7–0	Cleveland	
3	Bedford Bells	4–1	Lowestoft Town	
4	Binfield	3–0	Portsmouth	
5	Blackburn Rovers	4–2	Derby County	
6	Bournemouth	3–0	Bow Brickhill	
7	Bracknell Town	6–2	Slough Town	
8	Brighouse	3–5	Wakefield	
9	Brislington	2–8	Sherborne	
10	Cable–Tel (Newport)	1–5	Plymouth Pilgrims	
11	Cambridge City	2–4	Birmingham City	
12	Canary Racers	4–0	Pye	
13	Charlton	2–5	Whitehawk	
14	Chelsea	8–0	Hassocks	
15	Cheltenham YMCA	12–1	Freeway	
16	Clacton	H–W	Crystal Palace	
Walkover for Clacton
17	Clevedon United	0–6	Swindon Town Spitfires	
18	Colchester	3–2	Romford	
19	Collier Row	4–2	Abbey Rangers	
20	Crowborough Athletic	2–3	Barnet	
21	Darlington Spraire	3–13	Newcastle	
22	Denham United	3–1	Newbury	
23	Dulwich Hamlet	2–1	Surbiton Town	
24	Edenbridge Town	3–4	Colchester Royals	
25	Elmore Eagles	0–7	Frome	
26	Enfield	2–0	Sutton United	
27	Exeter Rangers	2–8	Worcester City	
28	Gillingham	3–7	Harlow Town	
29	Gosport Borough	2–5	Thame United	
30	Highfield Rangers	4–2	Calverton MW	
31	Inter Cardiff	15–0	Clevedon Town	
32	Kirklees	4–4 (a.e.t.)	Barnsley	
replay	Barnsley	1–0	Kirklees	
33	Leatherhead	4–1	Aylesbury United	
34	Leek Town	2–3	Bangor City	
35	Leighton Linslade	H–W	Atherstone	
Walkover for Leighton Linsdale
36	Lincoln United	0–4	Kilnhurst	

Tie	Home team (tier)	Score	Away team (tier)	Att.
37	Liverpool Feds	4–3	Rainworth Miners Welfare	
38	Manchester Belle Vue	10–1	Newsham Park Hospital	
39	Manchester City	0–1	Oldham Athletic	
40	Manchester United	7–0	Vernon–Carus	
41	Middlesbrough	3–1	South Shields	
42	Mill Hill United	6–0	Redbridge Wanderers	
43	Milton Keynes Athletic	1–1 (a.e.t.)	Dunstable	
replay	Dunstable	3–0	Milton Keynes Athletic	
44	Nettleham	1–2	Wrexham	
45	Newcastle Town	4–5	Stockport County	
46	Newton Abbot	1–3	Barry Town	
47	Palace Eagles	1–0	West Ham United	
48	Preston Rangers	3–2	Hull City	
49	Radcliffe Borough	12–0	Chester City	
50	Rea Valley Rovers	1–4	Cambridge United	
51	Reading Royals	1–2	Farnborough Town	
52	Rochdale	4–1	Wigan	
53	Rugby	0–12	Coventry City	
54	Scunthorpe Ironesses	1–1 (a.e.t.)	Bradford City	
replay	Bradford City	5–1	Scunthorpe Ironesses	
55	Sheffield Hallam United	4–1	Haslingden	
56	Sittingbourne	0–7	Newham	
Match abandoned after 86 minutes, result stands.
57	St George's	5–0	Teynham Gunners	
58	Stockport	10–1	Runcorn	
59	Sunderland	2–1	Leeds United	
60	Swindon Town	H–W	Cardiff Institute	
Walkover for Swindon Town
61	Tamworth	1–2	Leicester City	
62	Thames Valley	H–W	Sturminster Newton	
Walkover for Thames Valley
63	Tottenham Hotspur	9–0	Winchester & Ealing	
64	Truro City	1–0	Yate Town	
65	Warrington Town	1–2 (a.e.t.)	Chesterfield	
66	Watford	1–4	Fulham	
67	Winchester City	0–9	Camberley Town	
68	Winsford United	1–5	Whalley Rangers	

== Second round proper ==
All games were originally scheduled for 15 October 1995.

Tie	Home team (tier)	Score	Away team (tier)	Att.
1	Amble Town	1–5	Huddersfield Town	
2	Barnet	4–3	St George's	
3	Bedford Bells	3–1	Collier Row	
4	Berkhamsted Town	5–0	Fulham	
5	Bournemouth	0–2	Thame United	
6	Bracknell Town	1–7	Binfield	
7	Brentford	2–3	Leyton Orient	
8	Bristol City	2–3	Southampton Saints	
9	Bronte	3–2	Preston Rangers	
10	Camberley Town	1–7	Dulwich Hamlet	
11	Cambridge United	0–1	Newham	
12	Canary Racers	6–0	Harlow Town	
13	Cheltenham YMCA	2–2 (a.e.t.)	Barry Town	
replay	Barry Town	2–1	Cheltenham YMCA	
14	Clacton	1–5	Brighton & Hove Albion	
15	Colchester	3–7	Langford	
16	Coventry City	2–1	Chesterfield	
17	Denham United	14–0	Leighton Linslade	
18	Doncaster Rovers	0–3	Middlesbrough	
19	Dunstable	2–4	Blackburn Rovers	
20	Frome	3–0 (a.e.t.)	Thames Valley	
21	Garswood / St Helens United	3–0	Bradford City	

Tie	Home team (tier)	Score	Away team (tier)	Att.
22	Inter Cardiff	2–1	Kidderminster Harriers	
23	Ipswich Town	3–1	Three Bridges	
24	Kilnhurst	5–1	Barnsley	
25	Leicester City	1–5	Oldham Athletic	
26	Liverpool Feds	7–5 (a.e.t.)	Birmingham City	
27	Mill Hill United	4–2	Colchester Royals	
28	Notts County	1–3	Manchester Belle Vue	
29	Palace Eagles	3–1	Leatherhead	
30	Plymouth Pilgrims	3–0	Swindon Town	
31	Radcliffe Borough	1–4	Bangor City	
32	Rochdale	0–9	Tranmere Rovers	
33	RTM Newcastle Kestrels	0–1	Newcastle	
34	Sheffield Wednesday	6–0	Sheffield Hallam United	
35	Sherborne	18–0	Worcester City	
36	Stockport County	2–1	Stockport	
37	Sunderland	0–2	Wakefield	
38	Swindon Town Spitfires	3–1	Farnborough Town	
39	Tottenham Hotspur	5–4	Enfield	
40	Town & County	3–4 (a.e.t.)	Chelsea	
41	Truro City	0–1	Oxford United	
42	Whalley Rangers	0–4	Highfield Rangers	
43	Whitehawk	1–0	Wimbledon	
44	Wrexham	1–3	Manchester United	

== Third round proper ==
All games were originally scheduled for 12 November 1995.

Tie	Home team (tier)	Score	Away team (tier)	Att.
1	Bangor City	1–6	Huddersfield Town	
2	Barnet	0–4	Whitehawk	
3	Bedford Bells	0–6	Berkhamsted Town	
4	Blackburn Rovers	1–3	Manchester United	
5	Brighton & Hove Albion	6–0	Dulwich Hamlet	
6	Bronte	1–3	Stockport County	
7	Canary Racers	2–1	Mill Hill United	
8	Chelsea	3–1	Palace Eagles	
9	Coventry City	0–2	Sheffield Wednesday	
10	Frome	1–4	Binfield	
11	Inter Cardiff	3–0	Sherborne	
12	Ipswich Town	7–3	Denham United	

Tie	Home team (tier)	Score	Away team (tier)	Att.
13	Kilnhurst	2–4	Highfield Rangers	
14	Leyton Orient	2–3	Langford	
15	Middlesbrough	2–1	Manchester Belle Vue	
16	Newcastle	2–1	Wakefield	
17	Newham	0–6	Tottenham Hotspur	
18	Oldham Athletic	1–0	Liverpool Feds	
19	Oxford United	3–0	Thame United	
20	Plymouth Pilgrims	1–1 (a.e.t.)	Barry Town	
replay	Barry Town	4–3	Plymouth Pilgrims	
21	Swindon Town Spitfires	2–3	Southampton Saints	
22	Tranmere Rovers	2–3	Garswood / St Helens United	

== Fourth round proper ==
All games were originally scheduled for 3 and 10 December 1995.

3 December 1995	Arsenal (1)	10–0	Manchester United (3)	Bromley
	Sánchez 18'; Townshend; Britton 48'; Broadhurst; Pealling 62'; Rean; Few 75'; Wheatley; Williams	Report		Stadium: Hayes Lane; Attendance: 100; Referee: N. Copperwheat

3 December 1995	Binfield (3)	0–9	Doncaster Belles (1)	Binfield
		Report	Coultard 13'; Begg; Exley; (o.g.); Walker; Borman	Stadium: Hill Farm Lane; Attendance: 200

3 December 1995	Brighton & Hove Albion (2)	0–1	Ipswich Town (2)	East Preston
		Report	Goal	Stadium: The Lashmar; Attendance: 70

3 December 1995	Chelsea (3)	0–0 (a.e.t.)	Newcastle (3)	Motspur Park
		Report		Stadium: University of London

10 December 1995 Replay	Newcastle (3)	3–0	Chelsea (3)	Ponteland
	Goal	Report		Stadium: Northumbria Police

3 December 1995	Huddersfield Town (2)	2–1	Berkhamsted Town (2)	Emley
	Brannan 18', 80'	Report	Burton 67'	Stadium: Welfare Ground

3 December 1995	Ilkeston Town (1)	5–0	Highfield Rangers (3)	Ilkeston
	White; Kirk; Wren	Report		Stadium: New Manor Ground; Attendance: 102

3 December 1995	Inter Cardiff (3)	1–0	Wolverhampton Wanderers (1)	Leckwith
	Burgess 78'	Report		Stadium: Cardiff Athletics Stadium; Attendance: 40

3 December 1995	Liverpool (1)	3–0	Garswood St Helens United (2)	Kirkby
	Goal	Report		Stadium: Kirkby Sports; Attendance: 40

3 December 1995	Millwall Lionesses (1)	5–0	Langford (2)	Rotherhithe
	Goal	Report		Stadium: Surrey Docks Stadium; Attendance: 50

3 December 1995	Oldham Athletic (3)	2–4	Croydon (1)	Mossley
	Dean 41', 73'	Report	Powell 40' (pen.), 72'; Cottier 61'; Bampton 90'	Stadium: Seel Park; Attendance: 97

3 December 1995	Oxford United (2)	3–6	Everton (1)	The Northcourt
	Goal	Report	Goal	Attendance: 180

3 December 1995	Sheffield Wednesday (2)	2–3	Middlesbrough (3)	Dronfield
	Goal	Report	Goal	Stadium: Coach & Horses Ground; Attendance: 200

3 December 1995	Southampton Saints (2)	1–2 (a.e.t.)	Whitehawk (3)	Totton
	Goal	Report	Goal	Stadium: Testwood Stadium

3 December 1995	Stockport County (3)	0–9	Wembley (1)	Stockport
		Report	Goal	Stadium: Woodbank Stadium; Attendance: 40

3 December 1995	Tottenham Hotspur (3)	3–4 (a.e.t.)	Villa Aztecs (1)	Cheshunt
	Goal	Report	Goal	Stadium: Tesco Country Club; Attendance: 100

10 December 1995	Canary Racers (3)	2–2 (a.e.t.)	Barry Town (3)	Attleborough
	Goal	Report	Goal	Stadium: The Rec

7 January 1996 Replay	Barry Town (3)	1–4	Canary Racers (3)	Barry
	Goal	Report	Goal	Stadium: Jenner Park

== Fifth round proper ==
All games were played on 21 January 1996.

21 January 1996	Arsenal (1)	2–1	Wembley (1)	Bromley
	Williams 29'; Few	Report	Ball 40'	Stadium: Hayes Lane; Attendance: 101; Referee: R. Chilvers

21 January 1996	Canary Racers (3)	1–3	Ipswich Town (2)
	Goal	Report	Goal	Attendance: 230

21 January 1996	Croydon (1)	2–0	Inter Cardiff (3)	Croydon
	Bampton 22'; Cottier 88'	Report		Stadium: Croydon Sports Arena

21 January 1996	Huddersfield Town (2)	5–5 (a.e.t.)	Everton (1)	Emley
	Teale (pen.); Brannan 27', 90'; Mitchell 46'; Knight 79'	Report	Thomas 2', 83'; Ashworth 37', 89'; Marley 85'	Stadium: Welfare Ground; Attendance: 100

11 February 1996 Replay	Everton (1)	1–2	Huddersfield Town (2)	Crosby
	Johnson 60'	Report	Knight 2', 72'	Stadium: Rossett Park

21 January 1996	Ilkeston Town (1)	2–0	Millwall Lionesses (1)
	Kirk 22', 27'	Report

21 January 1996	Liverpool (1)	7–1	Middlesbrough (3)
	Easton; (o.g.)	Report	Goal

21 January 1996	Villa Aztecs (1)	1–5	Doncaster Belles (1)
	Edwards 30' (pen.)	Report	Walker; Jackson; Exley; Woodhead

21 January 1996	Whitehawk (3)	1–0	Newcastle (3)
	Goal	Report		Attendance: 130

== Quarter–finals ==
All games were scheduled to be played on 18 February 1996.

18 February 1996	Huddersfield Town (2)	0–9	Liverpool (1)	Emley
		Report	Harper 17' 33'; Hanley; Burke; Easton; Holland; Hewitt; Nunn (o.g.)	Stadium: Welfare Ground

18 February 1996	Whitehawk (3)	2–2 (a.e.t.)	Ipswich Town (2)
	Goal	Report	Goal

25 February 1996 Replay	Ipswich Town (2)	2–1	Whitehawk (3)
	Goal	Report	Goal

25 February 1996	Ilkeston Town (1)	1–2	Arsenal (1)	Ilkeston
15:00 GMT	Saggers 70'	Report	Britton 32'; Hastings 88'	Stadium: New Manor Ground; Attendance: 411
Note: Ilkeston Town's tie with Arsenal was rearranged for 25 February 1996.

3 March 1996	Croydon (1)	1–0 (a.e.t.)	Doncaster Belles (1)	East Dulwich
	McGloin 118'	Report		Stadium: Champion Hill
Note: Croydon's match with Doncaster Belles was postponed until 3 March 1996 due to a waterlogged pitch.

== Semi–finals ==
All games were played on 24 March 1996.

24 March 1996	Croydon (1)	5–0	Ipswich Town (2)	East Dulwich
	Proctor; Davis	Report		Stadium: Champion Hill

24 March 1996	Liverpool (1)	0–0 (a.e.t.) (5–4 p)	Arsenal (1)	Runcorn
		Report		Stadium: Canal Street; Referee: T. Massey
	Penalties
	Formston (penalty scored)		(penalty missed) Few; (penalty scored) Slee; (penalty scored) Broadhurst; (penalty scored) Williams; (penalty scored) Pealling

== Final ==
28 April 1996

Croydon	1–1 (a.e.t.)	Liverpool
Powell 38'	Report	Burke 22'
Penalties
Powell (penalty scored); Proctor (penalty missed); Sempare (penalty scored); Mapes (penalty scored)	3–2	(penalty scored) Burke; (penalty missed) Thomas; (penalty missed) Handley; (penalty scored) Duffy; (penalty missed) Formston

New Den
Attendance: 2,110
Referee: Scott Mathieson (Cheshire)
