= 1996 FA Women's Cup final =

1996 FA Women's Cup Final
- The match programme cover
- Event: 1995–96 FA Women's Cup
| Liverpool | Croydon |
| 1 | 1 |
- After extra time Croydon Women won 3–2 on penalties
- Date: 28 April 1996
- Venue: New Den, London
- Referee: Scott Mathieson (Cheshire)
- Attendance: 2,110

The 1996 FA Women's Cup Final was the 27th final of the FA Women's Cup, England's primary cup competition for women's football teams. It was the fifth final to be held under the direct control of the Football Association (FA). The match was contested by Liverpool and Croydon Women at The Den, home of Millwall. Future England goalkeeper Rachel Brown played in her first final at 15 years old. Croydon Women defeated Liverpool via penalty shootout.

== Match details ==
28 April 1996

| Liverpool | 1–1 (a.e.t.) | Croydon |
|---|---|---|
| Burke 22' | | Powell 38' |
Penalties
| Burke (penalty scored); Thomas (penalty missed); Handley (penalty missed); Duffy (penalty scored); Formston (penalty missed) | 3–2 | (penalty scored) Powell; (penalty missed) Proctor; (penalty scored) Sempare; (penalty scored) Mapes |

New Den
Attendance: 2,110
Referee: Scott Mathieson (Cheshire)

| Liverpool | Croydon |

| GK | 13 | (England) Rachel Brown |
| DF | 2 | (England) Leanne Taylor |
| DF | 3 | (England) Julie Griffiths | (substituted off) 34' |
| DF | 4 | (England) Clare Taylor (c) |
| DF | 5 | (England) Jill Thomas |
| MF | 6 | (England) Sammy Hayward |
| MF | 7 | (England) Karen Burke |
| MF | 8 | (England) Becky Easton | (substituted off) 119' |
| MF | 9 | (England) Maria Harper |
| FW | 10 | (England) Jody Handley |
| FW | 11 | (England) Joy McQuiggan | (substituted off) 78' |
Substitutes:
| FW | 12 | (England) Debbie Holland | (substituted on) 78' |
| DF | 13 | (England) Leanne Duffy | (substituted on) 89' |
| MF | 14 | (England) Gayle Formston | (substituted on) 119' |
Manager:
(England) Joby Humphries

| GK | 1 | (England) Louise Cooper |
| DF | 2 | (England) Anita Dines | (substituted off) 115' |
| DF | 3 | (England) Carole Osborne | (substituted off) 89' |
| DF | 4 | (England) Hope Powell (c) |
| DF | 5 | (England) Donna Smith |
| MF | 6 | (England) Columbine Saunders |
| MF | 7 | (England) Tina Mapes |
| MF | 8 | (England) Debbie Bampton | (substituted off) 9' |
| MF | 9 | (England) Brenda Sempare |
| FW | 10 | (England) Kerry Davis |
| FW | 11 | (England) Tara Proctor |
Substitutes:
| MF | 12 | (England) Alex Cottier | (substituted on) 9' |
| MF | 13 | (England) Caroline McGloin | (substituted on) 89' |
| DF | 14 | (England) Sarah Mulligan | (substituted on) 115' |
| DF | 15 | (England) Sammy Wilson |
| DF | 16 | (England) Andrea Cowan |
Player/Manager:
(England) Debbie Bampton

Player of the match

Assistant referees:
A. J. Green
M. R. Halsey

Match rules

- 90 minutes.
- 30 minutes of extra-time if necessary.
- Penalty shoot-out if scores still level.
- Five named substitutes.
- Maximum of two substitutions.
