= Louise Cooper (footballer) =

English footballer

Personal information
- Position: Goalkeeper

Senior career*
Years	Team	Apps	(Gls)
- Croydon Women
- * Club domestic league appearances and goals

Louise Cooper is a former women's footballer. Cooper's greatest achievement was winning the 1996 FA Women's Cup Final with Croydon Women.

== Honours ==
Croydon

- FA Women's Cup: 1996
