= Rachel Brown-Finnis =

English international association football goalkeeper

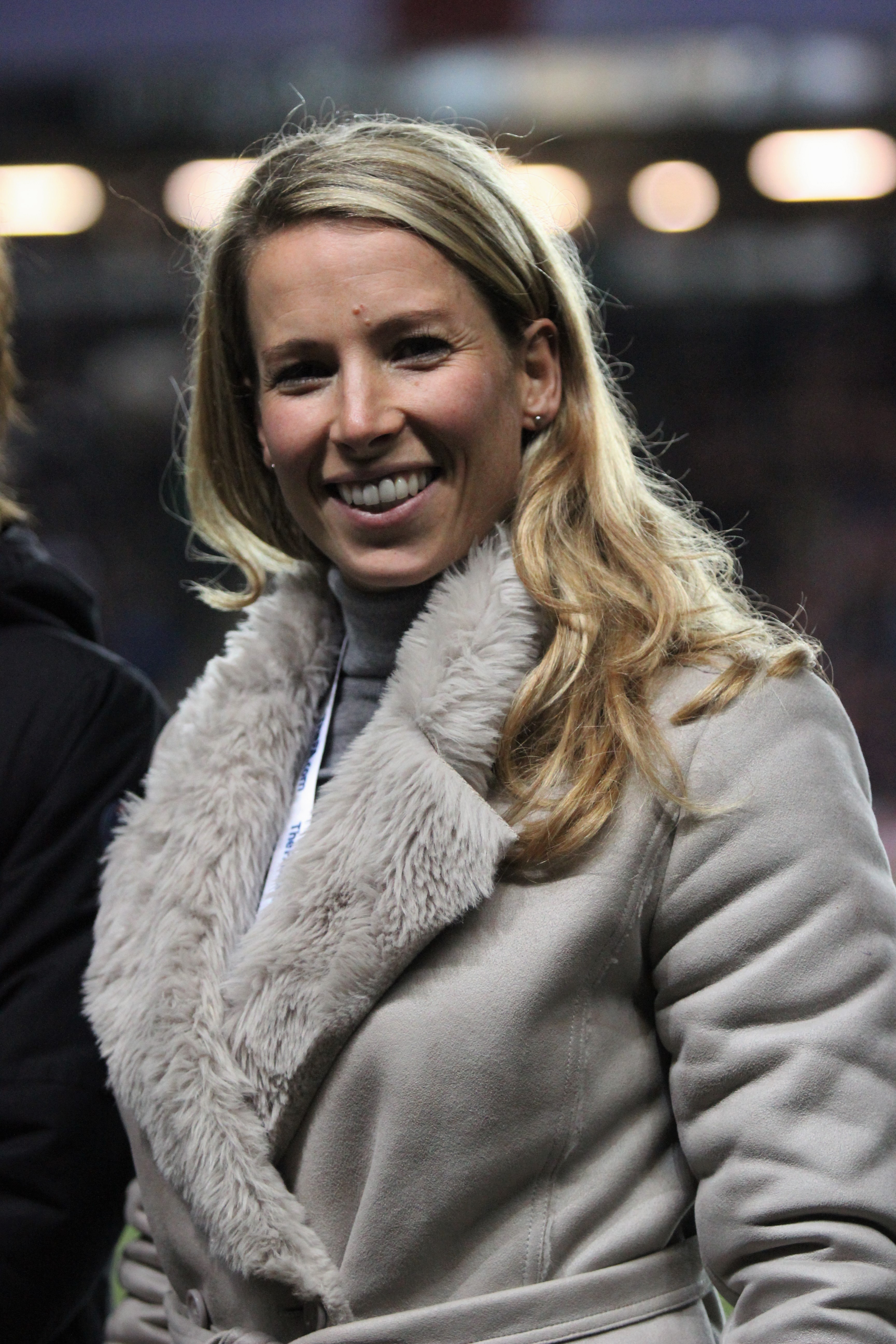
- Rachel Brown in February 2015

Personal information
- Full name: Rachel Laura Brown
- Date of birth: 2 July 1980 (age 46)
- Place of birth: Burnley, England
- Height: 5 ft 7 in (1.70 m)
- Position: Goalkeeper

Youth career
- Accrington Ladies

College career
Years	Team	Apps	(Gls)
1998–2000	Alabama Crimson Tide	41	(0)
2000–2003	Pittsburgh Panthers		

Senior career*
Years	Team	Apps	(Gls)
1995–1998	Liverpool		
2003–2014	Everton		
2003	→ ÍBV (loan)	7	(0)
2014	→ Arsenal (loan)	0	(0)

International career^{‡}
1997–2013	England	82	(0)
2012	Great Britain	1	(0)
- * Club domestic league appearances and goals ‡ National team caps and goals as of 26 February 2014 (UTC)

Rachel Brown (born 2 July 1980) is an English former football goalkeeper who played for Liverpool from 1995 to 1998, spent five years from 1998 playing varsity soccer for Alabama Crimson Tide and Pittsburgh Panthers in the US college system, and played for Everton from 2003 until 2014. She also spent the 2003 season on loan in the Icelandic Úrvalsdeild, playing for ÍBV. Since making her debut for the England women's national football team in 1997, Brown won over 80 caps. She understudied Pauline Cope in her first years with the national team, then served as England's first choice goalkeeper at the 2007 FIFA Women's World Cup and UEFA Women's Euro 2009. Due to injuries, Brown was displaced in the team by Karen Bardsley for the 2011 FIFA Women's World Cup. She was also selected in the Great Britain squad for the 2012 London Olympics. Brown was the goalkeeper on Channel Five's Superstars and is employed by Everton FC's Community Project. She married professional golf caddie Ian Finnis in 2013 and has since been known as Rachel Brown-Finnis.

== Club career ==
=== Early career ===
Brown was born in Burnley, Lancashire, and attended St Christopher's CE High School in Accrington. She began playing football as a goalkeeper at primary school, in a boys' team. She said: "They were reluctant to let me join in. It was a case of, 'OK, if you must play you'd better go in goal.'" After a few years of not playing in a team, due to The Football Association (FA) rules prohibiting mixed gender teams, Brown joined Accrington Ladies. (Note: Accrington Ladies founded in 1991 and merged with Accrington Girls Soccer Academy in 2004 to become Accrington Girls & Ladies FC. In 2012–13 Brown was Honorary President of the club. She has also described her first club as Accrington Stanley, the name of two male clubs which have represented the town in the Football League.) Being younger than the required 14, Brown played local open age football for the club.

Just after her 15th birthday, Brown joined Premier League National Division team Liverpool Ladies. She was scouted at an Easter holidays goalkeeping camp run by Bob Wilson in London, where Brown was the only female of 48 attendees. After applying for the camp through Match magazine, Brown was presented with the Player of the Camp award by David Seaman. Having expected to understudy Liverpool's experienced former England goalkeeper Tracey Davidson, Brown became first choice when Davidson quit football approximately three weeks later.

Brown's Liverpool debut came against all–conquering Arsenal on the opening day of the 1995–96 season. Liverpool lost the match, staged at Anfield, 6–0. A decade later, Brown recalled the occasion: "It was very, very daunting – yeah we lost big time! Being thrown in the deep end was an understatement – I was only small and it was hard enough playing against women never mind some of the best players in the whole country." The first season culminated in one of Brown’s early career highlights; participation in the 1996 FA Women's Cup Final at 15 years old with Liverpool. (Note: At 15 years 302 days, Brown is sometimes reported as the youngest ever player to have appeared in a Cup final. But Sue Lopez notes that she played alongside Graham Roberts' sister Sharon, who was 13, in Southampton's 8–2 final win over QPR in 1978.) After a 1–1 score with Croydon at The Den, Liverpool, with Brown carrying an injury, ultimately lost on penalties after extra time.

Brown remained with Liverpool while taking A Levels at Nelson and Colne College. In October 1997 she saved three times in a penalty shootout as the Reds eliminated Doncaster Belles in the first round of the FA Women's Premier League Cup. In that season's FA Women's Cup Liverpool were thrown out after Jody Handley played in a 3–1 quarter final win over Millwall Lionesses without international clearance.

=== United States ===
In 1998, Brown moved to the United States where she attended the University of Alabama and played for the Crimson Tide soccer team. The Sunday Mirror reported in February 2000 that Brown had signed a two-year sponsorship deal worth £100,000 with Uhlsport. In the same article Brown explained that she had left England because Americans had a more positive attitude towards women's football. Dissatisfied with aspects of the culture in the Deep South, Brown transferred to the University of Pittsburgh where she played for the Panthers soccer team and completed a degree in Sports Science. She was named Goalkeeper of the Year for the Big East Conference every year and also holds the Panthers' record for the fewest goals conceded in a season.

Brown on the culture in the Deep South: There was quite a lot of racism and that didn't sit easy with me. It's where the marches and riots were, where Rosa Parks was, and it still felt really raw. They were only a generation away from black toilets and white toilets. There were Afro-American players in the sport but I felt quite awkward. I couldn't get my head around why people didn't hang out together. And the religion – there was hypocrisy with what people preached and what they then did. I did rebel. I told the coach that morally they weren't right. I was outspoken.

=== Return to Merseyside ===
On returning to Liverpool, Brown found her old club relegated and languishing in the Premier League Northern Division. She qualified as a PE Teacher at Liverpool John Moores University and joined Everton Ladies in January 2003: "Everton were in the top division so I thought, 'change codes here, go to the Blues.'" She spent the 2003 summer season playing in Iceland, returning to Everton in August 2003. In December 2003 Brown suffered a serious knee injury that kept her out of the game until June 2005.

Danielle Hill played in goal for Everton in their 1–0 FA Women's Cup final defeat to Charlton Athletic in May 2005. Hill also played as Everton shocked Arsenal in the final of the 2008 Premier League Cup.

Brown played in her second FA Women's Cup final in 2010. Ahead of the match she told the Liverpool Echo: "I wouldn't say I'm in the twilight of my career but it's been a long time since 1996, so I'm very determined to put things right." She collected her first winner's medal as Everton beat Arsenal 3–2 after extra time.

In December 2014, guest player Brown was taken to the 2014 International Women's Club Championship in Japan by wild card entrants Arsenal Ladies. In January 2015, Brown decided to retire from football, citing that her body was telling her that it was time to stop.

== International career ==
=== England ===
Brown played eight times for the England Under-18 side and made her senior debut, aged 16, in February 1997 against Germany. She entered play as a substitute for regular goalkeeper Pauline Cope, as England were beaten 6–4 in the friendly at Deepdale. Manager Ted Copeland also gave Brown some playing time in the next match, a 6–0 friendly win over Scotland at Bramall Lane on 9 March 1997. Exactly a year later, Brown made her first home start in England's 1–0 World Cup qualifying defeat to Germany at The Den.

In October 2000, when Cope was struck down with a stomach complaint on the morning of England's Women's Euro 2001 qualification play-off in Ukraine, Brown took her place in England's 2–1 win. By the time of a May 2001 friendly against Scotland at Bolton's Reebok Stadium, Brown had 11 senior appearances and was Cope's regular understudy. Brown and Leanne Hall went to Euro 2001 as back-up to Cope, who played in all three games.

After impressing at her hometown club Burnley, where she had been a season-ticket holder as a child as England beat Australia 1–0 in September 2003, she was asked to turn on the Christmas lights in Burnley, but she had to cancel as she was playing for England as they beat Scotland 5–0 in November in nearby Preston. After a long spell out with injury, Brown returned to the England team against Sweden in the last group game of Women’s Euro 2005.

Brown kept her place, and conceded two goals, as England qualified for the 2007 FIFA Women's World Cup in China.

In May 2009, Brown was one of the first 17 female players to be given central contracts by The Football Association. Brown started every game of England's women's 2009 campaign.

In September 2010, Brown was controversially sent off in England's 2011 FIFA Women's World Cup qualifying win over Switzerland. Swiss forward Ramona Bachmann was criticised for her play-acting that led to the dismissal. Bachmann admitted there had been no foul and apologised for her actions, and Brown's red card was rescinded on appeal.

She was allotted 119 when the FA announced their legacy numbers scheme to honour the 50th anniversary of England's inaugural international.

=== Great Britain Olympic ===
In June 2012, Brown and Karen Bardsley were named as the goalkeepers in an 18-player Great Britain squad for the 2012 London Olympics. Brown described her selection as the pinnacle of her career to date. In 1996 Brown had been a ball girl at Legion Field for the Summer Olympics, while in America for coaching.

== Punditry ==
Since retiring from playing, she has worked as a football pundit for BT Sport and BBC Sport.

== Personal life ==
Brown attended St. Christopher's C of E High School in Accrington, Lancashire.

She married professional golf caddie Ian Finnis in January 2013; they live in Blundellsands, Crosby, Liverpool.

Injuries sustained by Brown include a dislocated finger, having her front teeth kicked out, several knee injuries, and a torn cruciate ligament. She has often been photographed to promote women's football.
