= Kerry Davis =

English footballer

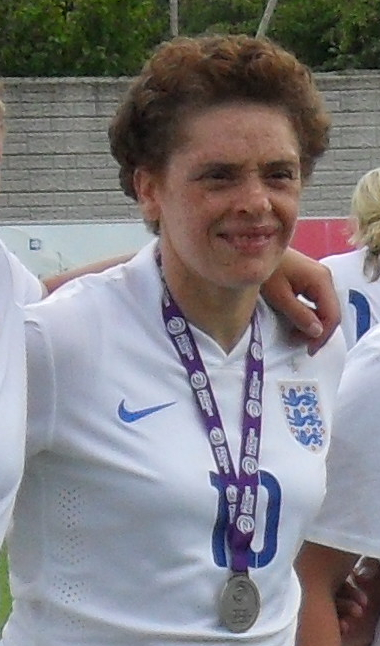
- Davis in 2015

Personal information
- Full name: Kerry Davis
- Date of birth: 2 August 1962 (age 64)
- Place of birth: Stoke-on-Trent, England
- Position: Forward

Senior career*
Years	Team	Apps	(Gls)
–1985	Crewe Alexandra Ladies		
1985–1986	Roi Lazio		
1986–1988	Trani 80		
1988–1989	Napoli		
1989–1992	Crewe Alexandra Ladies		
1992–1994	Liverpool Ladies		
1994–1999	Croydon Women		

International career
1982–1998	England	90	(43)
- * Club domestic league appearances and goals

Kerry Davis MBE (born 2 August 1962) is an English former international women's footballer. She was the first Black woman to play for the England women's national team. She is currently the third highest goal scorer for England behind Ellen White and Kelly Smith, with 43 goals.

During her 16-year international career, Davis represented England in the inaugural 1984 UEFA Championships final and at England's first FIFA Women's World Cup appearance in 1995. She also helped England win the Mundialito tournament in Italy and scored for her country at Wembley Stadium. At club level Davis spent four seasons playing in Italy, in between spells with Crewe Alexandra Ladies. She later played for Liverpool Ladies and Croydon.

== Club career ==
Davis was a 23–year–old student from Stoke-on-Trent, playing for Crewe Alexandra Ladies, when Italian club Roi Lazio signed her in November 1985. She spent four years playing semi–professionally in Italy, one year at the Stadio Flaminio with Roi Lazio, two years with Trani and one with Napoli. In her second season with Trani, Davis played alongside compatriot Debbie Bampton. They finished runners–up in both the Serie A and national Cup before the club folded and Bampton returned to England.

After a further year at Napoli, Davis returned to Crewe Alexandra Ladies, but by April 1994 was playing for Knowsley United Women in the FA Women's Cup final. Knowsley became Liverpool Ladies that summer and Davis left for Croydon Women in December 1994.

In 1996, Davis was playing for Croydon when they won the league and cup double. In May 1996 goals from Davis and Brenda Sempare earned the decisive 2–1 league win over Arsenal Ladies. That summer she sparked rumours of a transfer by guesting for Arsenal Ladies in a pre–season tournament, but remained with Croydon. She eventually resigned in April 1999.

== International career ==
Davis made her England debut in 1982, becoming England's first black woman international. Davis played in the first UEFA championships for national women's teams in 1984. England reached the final only to lose to Sweden on penalties, despite Davis successfully converting her kick. In the qualifying stages, Davis had been England's top scorer after making her debut in the first ever match in UEFA competition; a 7–1 win over Northern Ireland at Gresty Road on 19 September 1982. In August 1985 Davis scored in a 1–1 group stage draw with Italy, during England's victorious Mundialito campaign. At the 1987 UEFA championships England lost to Sweden at the semi–final stage, 3–2 after extra time. Davis gave England the lead against Italy in the third place match, but Carolina Morace and Betty Vignotto replied to ensure England finished fourth.

As a curtain–raiser to the 1990 FA Charity Shield, England played Italy at Wembley Stadium. Davis netted a consolation in England's 4–1 defeat, while Carolina Morace scored all four Italian goals and featured on the front page of the following day's La Gazzetta dello Sport. Davis later described her former Trani teammate Morace as: "the best women's player I have ever seen."

Davis also played in all four of England's matches at the 1995 FIFA Women's World Cup. She had won her 60th cap in the 4–1 UEFA Women's Euro 1995 semi–final first–leg defeat to Germany on 11 December 1994. In May 1996 Davis scored two goals and set up the other for strike–partner Kelly Smith in a 3–0 win over Portugal at Griffin Park. Although Davis's versatility saw her selected as a midfielder or sometimes as a defender, she continued to score at a prolific rate. By the time of a World Cup qualifier against the Netherlands in October 1997, Davis had 42 goals in 78 appearances. In March 1998, Davis made her 82nd and final appearance for England, but was substituted 20 minutes into a 1–0 defeat to Germany at The Den.

Davis left the England squad in April 1998, ahead of another friendly with Italy.

In October 2010, She Kicks magazine reported that Davis remained England's all–time record goalscorer. Although it was stated that records were "sketchy" because the Football Association (FA) took over running women's football in 1993. There was uncertainty whether all Davis's goals before this were scored in matches considered official. In February 2012 Kelly Smith netted twice against Finland, moving on to 45 goals for England and setting a new record.

== International goals ==
No.	Date	Venue	Opponent	Score	Result	Competition
1.	19 September 1982	Crewe, England	Northern Ireland	?–?	7–1	1984 European Competition for Women's Football qualifying
2.	19 September 1982	Crewe, England	Northern Ireland	?–?	7–1	1984 European Competition for Women's Football qualifying
3.	3 October 1982	Dumbarton, Scotland	Scotland	1–0	4–0	1984 European Competition for Women's Football qualifying
4.	3 October 1982	Dumbarton, Scotland	Scotland	2–0	4–0	1984 European Competition for Women's Football qualifying
5.	3 October 1982	Dumbarton, Scotland	Scotland	3–0	4–0	1984 European Competition for Women's Football qualifying
6.	3 October 1982	Dumbarton, Scotland	Scotland	4–0	4–0	1984 European Competition for Women's Football qualifying
7.	7 November 1982	Dublin, Ireland	Republic of Ireland	1–0	1–0	1984 European Competition for Women's Football qualifying
8.	14 May 1983	Belfast, Northern Ireland	Northern Ireland	?–0	4–0	1984 European Competition for Women's Football qualifying
9.	14 May 1983	Belfast, Northern Ireland	Northern Ireland	?–0	4–0	1984 European Competition for Women's Football qualifying
10.	11 September 1983	Reading, England	Republic of Ireland	?–0	6–0	1984 European Competition for Women's Football qualifying
11.	11 September 1983	Reading, England	Republic of Ireland	?–0	6–0	1984 European Competition for Women's Football qualifying
12.	30 October 1983	Charlton, England	Sweden	?–?	2–2	Friendly
13.	17 Marc 1985	Lancashire, England	Scotland	3–0	4–0	1987 European Competition for Women's Football qualifying
14.	25 May 1985	Antrim, Northern Ireland	Northern Ireland	?–?	8–1	1987 European Competition for Women's Football qualifying
15.	25 May 1985	Antrim, Northern Ireland	Northern Ireland	?–?	8–1	1987 European Competition for Women's Football qualifying
16.	25 May 1985	Antrim, Northern Ireland	Northern Ireland	?–?	8–1	1987 European Competition for Women's Football qualifying
17.	25 May 1985	Antrim, Northern Ireland	Northern Ireland	?–?	8–1	1987 European Competition for Women's Football qualifying
18.	25 May 1985	Antrim, Northern Ireland	Northern Ireland	?–?	8–1	1987 European Competition for Women's Football qualifying
19.	17 August 1985	Ramsey, Isle of Man	Wales	?–0	6–0	Friendly
20.	16 March 1986	Blackburn, England	Northern Ireland	5–0	10–0	1987 European Competition for Women's Football qualifying
21.	16 March 1986	Blackburn, England	Northern Ireland	8–0	10–0	1987 European Competition for Women's Football qualifying
22.	16 March 1986	Blackburn, England	Northern Ireland	9–0	10–0	1987 European Competition for Women's Football qualifying
23.	27 April 1986	Reading, England	Republic of Ireland	1–0	4–0	
24.	27 April 1986	Reading, England	Republic of Ireland	4–0	4–0	
25.	29 March 1987	Dublin, Ireland	Republic of Ireland	1–0	1–0	Friendly
26.	11 June 1987	Moss, Norway	Sweden	2–1	3–2 (a.e.t.)	1987 European Competition for Women's Football
27.	13 June 1987	Drammen, Norway	Italy	1–0	1–2	1987 European Competition for Women's Football
28.	8 November 1987	Reading, England	Denmark	2–0	2–1	1989 European Competition for Women's Football qualifying

== Awards ==
In 2022, Davis was inducted into the National Football Museum Hall of Fame. Davis received the Keith Alexander award, at the Football Black List event in April, 2024, for being a pioneer in women's football.

She was made a Member of the Most Excellent Order of the British Empire for services to association football and diversity in sport in the 2026 New Year Honours.

== Personal life ==
Davis was born in England to a Jamaican father and English mother. After returning from Italy Davis worked in a sports shop in Stoke-on-Trent.

== Honours ==
Croydon

- FA Women's Cup: 1996
- FA Women's Premier League: 1995–96
