= Alex Cottier =

English footballer

Alex Cottier-Small
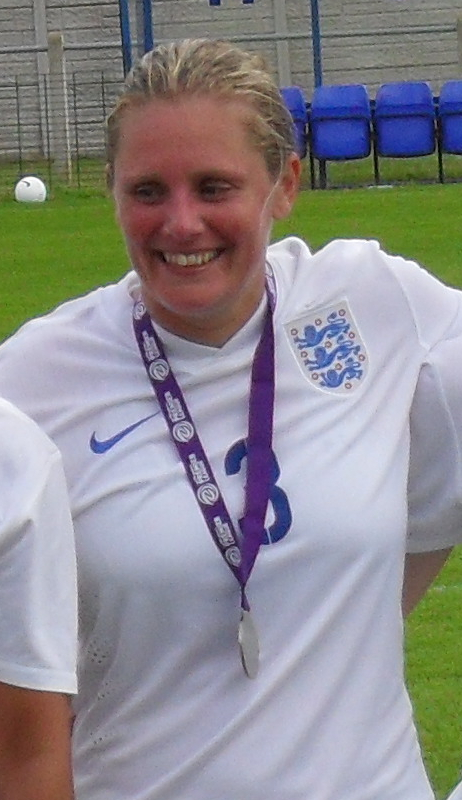

Personal information
- Full name: Alexandra Cottier-Small
- Date of birth: 6 December 1973 (age 52)
- Positions: Defender; midfielder; forward

Senior career*
Years	Team	Apps	(Gls)
1991–1994	Brighton & Hove Albion		
1994–2000	Croydon		
2000–2001	Southampton Saints		
2001	Arsenal		
2001–2003	Southampton Saints		
2003–2004	Bristol Rovers		
- AFC Wimbledon
- AFC Bournemouth Ladies
2008–2011	Andover New Street Ladies		

International career
	1994-1998 England	5	(0)
- * Club domestic league appearances and goals

Alexandra "Alex" Cottier-Small (née Cottier) (born 6 December 1973) is an English former international footballer. As well as the England women's national football team, Cottier-Small played FA Women's Premier League football for clubs including Croydon and Arsenal. She won the FA Women's Cup twice during her career with Croydon.

== Club career ==
Croydon player–manager Deborah Bampton signed Cottier-Small and Donna Smith from Brighton in 1994. A versatile left–sided player, Cottier-Small performed as a striker, winger and defender in Croydon's League and Cup double winning team in 1996. The 1996 FA Women's Cup final was won by defeating Liverpool in the final on penalties. Cottier-Small came on as a ninth minute substitute. Her Croydon team finished runners-up to Arsenal in the 1998 final but she won for a second time in the 2000 final where she was named on the substitutes bench as Croydon defeated Doncaster Belles 2-1 at Bramall Lane.

In 2001–02 Cottier-Small was on the books of Arsenal Ladies. She rejoined Southampton during the season.

In November 2003 Cottier-Small quit relegated Southampton to sign for Bristol Rovers. Rovers manager Tony Ricketts said of Cottier-Small: "Her experience of top flight football will be invaluable to us, as will the fact that she can play either in centre midfield or at centre half – those are two areas where we've been vulnerable since the start of the season."

Cottier-Small signed for Andover New Street Ladies in summer 2008.

== International career ==
Cottier-Small represented England at senior level. She was called–up for the first time in March 1994, for a European Championship qualifier versus Belgium at the City Ground. Arsenal left–back Michelle Curley had withdrawn from the squad after she dislocated her knee in an FA Women's Cup tie. At the time Cottier-Small's manager at Southern Division Brighton, Julie Hemsley, was also England coach Ted Copeland's assistant.

She has England legacy number 107. The FA announced their legacy numbers scheme to honour the 50th anniversary of England’s inaugural international.

== Personal life ==
Cottier-Small served in the British Army and played football for their representative team.
