= Tara Proctor =

English footballer

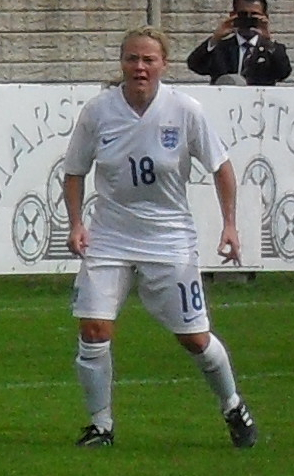

Personal information
- Full name: Tara Proctor
- Date of birth: 31 January 1971 (age 55)
- Place of birth: England
- Position: Midfielder

Senior career*
Years	Team	Apps	(Gls)
- Maidstone Tigresses
–2001	Charlton Athletic Ladies		
2002–2003	Brighton & Hove Albion Women		

International career
1995–2002	England	20	(0)
- * Club domestic league appearances and goals

Tara Proctor (born 31 January 1971) is a former English footballer, and former England international captain. An inspirational central midfielder, Proctor featured for Croydon/Charlton Athletic on the club level.

== Club career ==
Proctor represented England at tennis as a youngster, but decided to play football after a break from sport as a teenager.

With Croydon, Proctor won the Premier League three times and the FA Women's Cup twice, before Croydon came under the auspices of Charlton Athletic in 2000. She quit Charlton for Brighton in December 2001, in the aftermath of a huge squad bust-up. However, Charlton invoked a ruling which left a "distraught" Proctor unable to play for Brighton until the following season.

The move to struggling Brighton – Proctor was the England captain at the time – was reported as evidence of the enduring amateurism in English women's football. Proctor clarified that her decision was related to her career outside football, having secured a job in the leisure industry which required weekend working. She returned to action for Brighton in 2002–03, but The Seagulls were relegated after winning just one game all season.

== International career ==
Although not selected for the FIFA Women's World Cup 1995, Proctor played for England in the 1997 UEFA Women's Championship qualification campaign. In September 1996, Proctor started both legs of England's play-off defeat to Spain.

Proctor was selected for the 2001 UEFA Women's Championship. She was named captain for England's final group game against Germany, when regular skipper Mo Marley was dropped following the 4–0 defeat to Sweden. After the retirement of several senior players, Proctor retained the captaincy for England's 2003 FIFA Women's World Cup qualification campaign. Manager and former Croydon teammate Hope Powell valued Proctor's experience, stating "She is a good motivator and she has a very good relationship with the youngsters."

Proctor had missed a friendly against Denmark in August 2001 as she was on holiday on a Greek Island. In the run-up to England's first qualifier in Germany, Proctor had slept in a t-shirt commemorating the England male team's famous 5–1 win in Munich in a bid to bring luck. Despite a strong individual performance, Proctor's England were beaten 3–1 in Kassel.

She started qualifiers against the Netherlands and Portugal, before dropping out of the side due to a recurring knee injury. For the return fixture with Portugal, an 18-year-old Fara Williams replaced Proctor in the line-up and scored a free-kick on her first international start. It was also reported that Proctor's protracted transfer from Charlton Athletic to Brighton had placed her international future in doubt.

In July 2002 Proctor was recalled for a friendly with Nigeria at Carrow Road, winning her 20th cap. She subsequently withdrew from the squad from the qualification play-off games against Iceland and France due to the death of her mother.

Proctor was allotted 110 when the FA announced their legacy numbers scheme to honour the 50th anniversary of England's inaugural international.
