= Hope Powell =

English football player and manager

Hope Powell CBE
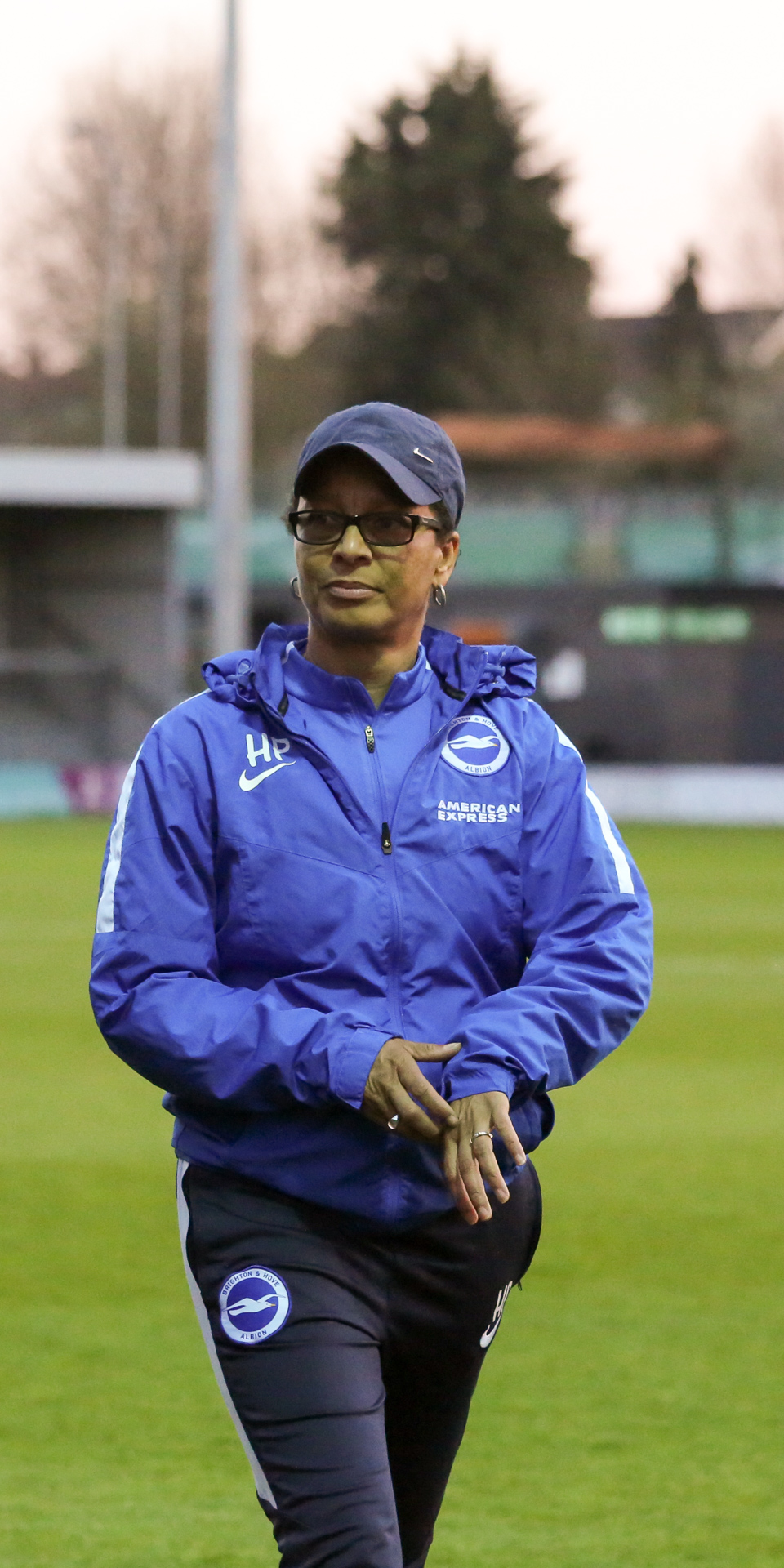
- Powell in April 2018, managing Brighton & Hove Albion

Personal information
- Full name: Hope Patricia Powell
- Date of birth: 8 December 1966 (age 59)
- Place of birth: Lewisham, England
- Position: Midfielder

Team information
- Current team: Birmingham City (technical director)

Senior career*
Years	Team	Apps	(Gls)
1978–1987	Millwall Lionesses		
1987–1989	Friends of Fulham		
1989–1991	Millwall Lionesses		
1991–1994	Bromley Borough		
1994–1998	Croydon		

International career
1983–1998	England	72	(17)

Managerial career
- 1998–2013: England
- 2012: Great Britain Olympic
- 2017–2022: Brighton & Hove Albion
- 2023–: Birmingham City (technical director)
- * Club domestic league appearances and goals

Hope Patricia Powell CBE (born 8 December 1966) is an English football coach and former player who is the Women's Technical Director at Birmingham City.

As a player, Powell won 72 caps for England, mainly as an attacking midfielder, scoring 17 goals. She made her England debut at the age of 16, and went on to play in the 1995 FIFA Women's World Cup, England's first World Cup appearance. She was also vice-captain of her country. At club level, Powell played in four FA Women's Cup finals and captained Croydon to a League and Cup double in 1996.

The Football Association (FA) appointed Powell as England's first-ever full-time national coach in 1998. She led the team at the 2001, 2005, 2009 and 2013 editions of the UEFA Women's Championship. After failing to qualify in 2003, she guided England to the quarter-finals of the FIFA Women's World Cup in 2007 and 2011. England's best results, reaching the final of the UEFA Women's Championship in 1984 and 2009, both featured Powell. She was a player at the former and coach at the latter.

As well as managing the England senior team, Powell oversaw the whole structure from Under-15s to the Under-23s, a coach mentoring scheme and The FA's National Player Development Centre at Loughborough University. In May 2009, Powell's administration implemented central contracts, to help players focus on full-time training and playing, without having to fit it around full-time employment. Initially, 17 players signed contracts. In 2003, Powell became the first woman to achieve the UEFA Pro Licence, the highest coaching qualification available. She also managed the Great Britain women's Olympic football team during the 2012 Summer Olympics and Brighton & Hove Albion from 2017 to 2022.

== Club career ==
=== Millwall ===
Powell made newspaper headlines when FA rules banned her from representing her school team beyond the age of 11. The teacher running the team had appealed against the ban, not, according to Powell, because he was interested in gender equality, but because of a pragmatic desire to field his strongest team. Powell moved on to play club football for Millwall Lionesses when she reached 11.

At Millwall Lionesses, Powell came under the influence of coach Alan May. A senior manager with British Telecom, May taught Powell people management skills and remained a major inspiration throughout her career, including when she moved into coaching herself. May was employed as Powell's head scout when she became England manager.

=== Fulham ===
As the club grew to be one of the most successful in England, Powell left for London rivals Friends of Fulham. A two-year spell with Friends of Fulham culminated in an appearance at the 1989 Women's FA Cup final. Powell scored twice and is reported to have played exceptionally well, but her team were beaten 3–2 by Leasowe Pacific. The match was played at Old Trafford but attracted only 914 spectators, although it was also broadcast on Channel 4.

=== Return to Millwall ===
In the aftermath of that defeat, Powell returned to Millwall Lionesses, where she became the team's all-time record goalscorer. In 1991, they reached the Women's FA Cup final and beat Doncaster Belles 1–0 at Prenton Park to win the Cup for the first time. Millwall Lionesses also won the Greater London League to qualify for the inaugural National Division in the 1991–92 season.

=== Bromley and Croydon ===
The team broke up in the aftermath of that success and Powell moved with teammate Sue Law to form a new club Bromley Borough. Beginning in the South East Counties League, the club quickly progressed through the divisions. After adding England player Brenda Sempare in 1992, Bromley Borough won all 16 matches in the South East Counties League Division One, scoring 142 goals in the process. The team also reached the semi-final of the Women's FA Cup, where they lost 2–0 to treble-winning Arsenal.

In the 1993–94 season, Bromley Borough won the National League Division One South by ten points, securing promotion into the top flight of English women's football. Despite this, they were handed a chastening 10–1 defeat by Doncaster Belles in the fifth round of the Women's FA Women's Cup. For the 1994–95 season, the club entered a partnership with Croydon and enlisted Powell's England teammate Debbie Bampton as manager. Powell was one of six Croydon players who represented England at the 1995 FIFA Women's World Cup.

With Powell as captain and Bampton as player-manager, Croydon won a domestic double in 1995–96. In the FA Women's Cup final against Liverpool at The Den, Powell equalised Karen Burke's opening goal then scored from the spot as Croydon won a penalty shootout. A farcical end of season fixture backlog saw Croydon play five games in ten days, winning four and drawing one to erode Doncaster Belles' 13-point lead, and win the National Premier Division on goal difference.

In the 1997–98 season, Croydon lost both domestic Cup finals to Arsenal. The 1998 FA Women's Cup final was lost 3–2 and, despite scoring Croydon's second goal, Powell missed out on her third winners' medal. She had agreed to take over as England coach and retired from playing.

== International career ==
Martin Reagan gave Powell her England debut against Republic of Ireland, in a 6–0 Euro qualifying win staged at Elm Park in Reading, Berkshire on 11 September 1983. Aged 17, Powell played in the final of the 1984 European Competition for Women's Football as England were beaten by Sweden on penalties. The two-legged final had seen England recover a one goal deficit at Kenilworth Road in Luton, in muddy conditions described by Powell as "absolutely shocking".

She was allotted 61 when the FA announced their legacy numbers scheme to honour the 50th anniversary of England's inaugural international.

== International goals ==
No.	Date	Venue	Opponent	Score	Result	Competition
1.	17 March 1985	Preston, England	Scotland	4–0	4–0	1987 European Competition for Women's Football qualifying
2.	25 May 1985	Antrim, Northern Ireland	Northern Ireland	?–?	8–1	1987 European Competition for Women's Football qualifying
3.	17 August 1985	Ramsey, Isle of Man	Wales	?–0	6–0	1987 European Competition for Women's Football qualifying
4.	17 August 1985	Ramsey, Isle of Man	Wales	?–0	6–0	1987 European Competition for Women's Football qualifying
5.	22 September 1985	Cork, Ireland	Republic of Ireland	2–0	6–0	1987 European Competition for Women's Football qualifying
6.	16 March 1986	Blackburn, England	Northern Ireland	9–0	10–0	1987 European Competition for Women's Football qualifying
7.	16 March 1986	Blackburn, England	Northern Ireland	10–0	10–0	1987 European Competition for Women's Football qualifying
8.	12 October 1986	Kirkcaldy, Scotland	Scotland	2–0	3–1	1987 European Competition for Women's Football qualifying
7.	11 April 1987	Leeds, England	Northern Ireland	?–0	6–0	Friendly
8.	17 March 1990	Ypres, Belgium	Belgium	1–0	3–0	UEFA Women's Euro 1991 qualifying
9.	17 March 1990	Ypres, Belgium	Belgium	2–0	3–0	UEFA Women's Euro 1991 qualifying
10.	17 April 1994	Brentford, England	Slovenia	?–0	10–0	UEFA Women's Euro 1995 qualifying

== Managerial and coaching career ==
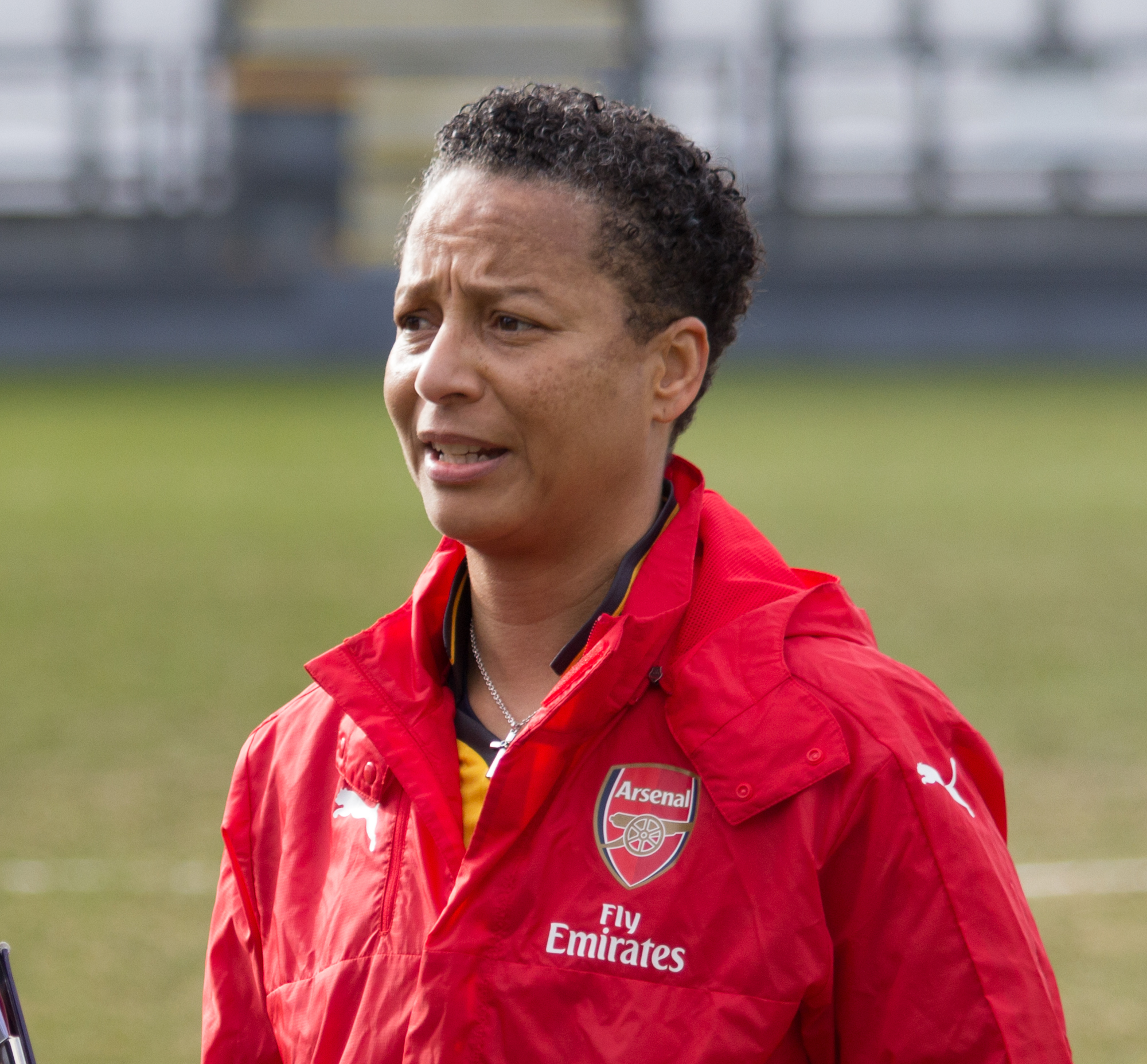
Powell in 2017

=== First steps into coaching ===
Powell had passed the FA's preliminary coaching award at the age of 19. During her later playing career she had worked as a development officer for Lewisham London Borough Council and in Crystal Palace FC's community outreach scheme. She had also been a volunteer coach at soccer camps in the United States. Ted Copeland encouraged Powell to complete the FA's new female coach mentoring scheme and obtain her 'B' licence while she was still playing.

=== England Women ===
England were unfortunate to be drawn in a 1999 FIFA Women's World Cup qualification group with Norway and Germany, the reigning World and European champions, respectively. Copeland quit as manager after a 1–0 defeat to Germany at The Den in March 1998, which Powell had started.

At 31, Powell became the youngest ever coach of any England national football team, as well as the first woman and the first non-white person to hold the office.

On 26 July 1998, Powell managed England for the first time in a friendly against Sweden at Victoria Road, Dagenham. After entering the game as a substitute, Swedish debutant Malin Moström scored the only goal on 84 minutes. Powell's first competitive fixture in charge was the 2–0 defeat to Norway in Lillestrøm the following month, which consigned England to last place in the group and meant they faced a relegation play-off against Romania. Had England lost they faced being demoted to B level and therefore unable to qualify for major tournaments. Powell described the situation as "very much do-or-die" since a substantial reduction in funding was at stake. A 6–2 aggregate victory kept England's place among the elite.

In 2003, Powell became the first woman to be awarded the UEFA Pro Licence, studying alongside Stuart Pearce. She had become England coach in 1998, and led the national team to the final of Euro 2009 where they lost to Germany. It was speculated that Powell would become the first female manager in English men's football when she was linked with the vacant managerial role at Grimsby Town in October 2009, however caretaker manager Neil Woods was appointed on a permanent basis.

At the 2011 FIFA Women's World Cup, England suffered a quarter-final penalty shootout defeat to France following a 1–1 draw. Powell controversially attributed "cowardice" to the players who had failed to volunteer to take a penalty. After England's disastrous showing at UEFA Women's Euro 2013, there was a clamour for Powell to be sacked. However, despite the first round exit, she retained the support of the FA.

In July 2013, rival coach Keith Boanas made an outspoken attack on Powell's record as England manager and publicly called on her to resign. Boanas who had also applied for the job in 1998 but was not granted an interview said he suspected that the selection of the relatively unqualified Powell was "a political appointment to cover all bases". He criticised Powell's role in the international retirement of his wife Pauline Cope and suggested that anyone could match or surpass Powell's achievements, given a similar level of support.

On 20 August 2013, Powell was sacked as manager of the England women's team.

=== Brighton & Hove Albion ===
On 19 July 2017, Brighton & Hove Albion announced that Powell had been appointed as first-team manager of the club's women's team. On 31 October 2022, Powell stepped down from the role with an 8–0 defeat to Tottenham Hotspur being her final match in charge.

=== England men's U20s ===
On 19 May 2023, it was announced that Powell would join the England men's U20s as a technical advisor at the 2023 FIFA U-20 World Cup.

=== Birmingham City ===
On 20 July 2023, Powell was announced as the new Women's Technical Director at Birmingham City.

== Managerial statistics ==
As of matches played on 30 October 2022

Managerial record by team and tenure
Team	From	To	Record								Ref
Team	From	To	G	W	D	L	GF	GA	GD	Win %	Ref
Brighton	19 July 2017	31 October 2022	136	51	14	71	171	253	−82	37.50	
Career totals			136	51	14	71	171	253	−82	37.50	

== Honours ==
Powell was appointed Officer of the Order of the British Empire (OBE) in the 2002 Birthday Honours for services to association football, and promoted to Commander of the Order of the British Empire (CBE) in the 2010 Birthday Honours for services to sport. In 2003, she was inducted into the English Football Hall of Fame in recognition of her talents.

In 2009, she was awarded an Honorary Doctorate by Loughborough University. Powell was awarded an Honorary Doctorate by the University of East London in 2011. She was also awarded an Honorary Doctorate of Sport by the University of Chichester in 2018.

=== Player ===
Millwall Lionesses

- FA Women's Cup: 1991

Croydon

- FA Women's Cup: 1996
- FA Women's Premier League: 1995–96

England

- Mundialito (2): 1985, 1988

=== Manager ===
England

- Cyprus Cup (2): 2009, 2013

Individual

- Women's Super League Manager of the Month: February 2019, September 2020, February 2021

== Personal life ==
Powell was born and raised in London to a family of Jamaican descent. In 1990, Powell graduated from Brunel University in London with a degree in Sport Science and History.

In August 2010, she was named in 68th place on The Independent newspaper's annual Pink List of influential LGBT people in the UK. Her entry was subsequently redacted from the online version of the article and her name was absent from the 2011 and 2012 lists. Powell was included in a rival World Pride Power List compiled by Square Peg Media in association with The Guardian; reaching fifth place in 2011 and 48th place in 2012. Commenting about her relationships with men, she said they were "intrigued" to discover that she was a footballer.

In an October 2005 interview with Diva magazine, Powell commented about lesbians in football: "There's always been that stereotyping of female footballers as butch, dykey and unattractive, so maybe it's just best left alone."

Powell's autobiography, Hope: My Life in Football, was published in 2016.
