= Brenda Sempare =

English footballer

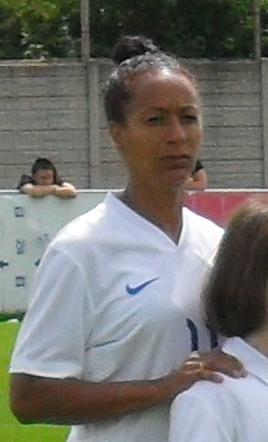

Personal information
- Date of birth: 9 November 1961 (age 64)
- Place of birth: England
- Position: Midfielder

Senior career*
Years	Team	Apps	(Gls)
- Friends of Fulham
- Croydon Ladies

International career
1983-1995	England	55	(5)
- * Club domestic league appearances and goals

Brenda Sempare (born 9 November 1961) is an English former international women's footballer. She played in all four games of England's 1995 FIFA Women's World Cup appearance.

== Club career ==
Sempare helped Friends of Fulham win the 1985 FA Women's Cup. In November 2001 Hope Powell wrote in The Times that Sempare's performance in 1985's 2–0 final win over Doncaster Belles at Craven Cottage was "the best all-round performance I have ever seen." Sempare played in two more WFA Cup finals with Friends of Fulham but they were defeated by Leasowe Pacific in the 1989 final held at Old Trafford and by Doncaster Belles in the 1990 final at the Baseball Ground.

In April 1996, Sempare was one of Croydon Ladies' penalty scorers as Croydon beat Liverpool Ladies on penalties in the FA Women's Cup final at The New Den. The following month goals from Sempare and Kerry Davis earned a 2–1 league win over Arsenal Ladies, which sealed a domestic double for Croydon.

Sempare retired at the end of that 1995–96 season, but returned to action during 1996–97. On 23 September 2010, she was inducted into the English Football Hall of Fame.

== International career ==
Sempare scored a goal in the final as England beat Italy in the final of the 1985 Mundialito. While working as a postwoman Sempare helped England reach the semi-final of the 1987 European Competition for Women's Football, where they lost 3–2 to Sweden after extra time. She had also featured in the 1984 tournament, where England reached the final.

Sempare also played for England at the 1995 World Cup.

She was allotted 62 when the FA announced their legacy numbers scheme to honour the 50th anniversary of England’s inaugural international.
