= Leanne Duffy =

English footballer

Personal information
- Position: Midfielder

Senior career*
Years	Team	Apps	(Gls)
- Everton
- * Club domestic league appearances and goals

Leanne Duffy is a retired football player who played for Everton. Since retiring Duffy has been a football coach for Liverpool Feds.
