= 1995–96 FA Women's Premier League =

FA Women's Premier League
- Season: 1995–96

The 1995–96 FA Women's Premier League season was the 5th season of the FA Women's Premier League.

== National Division ==
FA Women's Premier League National Division
- Season: 1995–96
- Champions: Croydon; 1st title
- Relegated: Villa Aztecs; Wolverhampton Wanderers
- Matches: 90
- Goals: 363 (4.03 per match)
- Biggest home win: Arsenal 9–0 Wolverhampton Wanderers (20 April 1996)
- Highest scoring: Everton 4–6 Croydon (3 September 1995)
- Longest unbeaten run: Croydon (18)
- Longest winless run: Wolverhampton Wanderers (18)

Locations of the FA Women's Premier League National Division Teams
Locations of the FA Women's Premier League National Division Teams (Greater London)

Changes from last season:

- Villa Aztecs were promoted from the Northern Division as Champions
- Red Star Southampton were relegated to the Southern Division
- Leasowe Pacific became Everton
- Ilkeston Town Rangers became Ilkeston Town

=== League table ===
Pos	Team	Pld	W	D	L	GF	GA	GD	Pts	Qualification or relegation
1	Croydon (C)	18	13	5	0	58	17	+41	44	
2	Doncaster Belles	18	14	2	2	57	19	+38	44	
3	Arsenal	18	11	4	3	54	12	+42	37	
4	Everton	18	10	1	7	44	40	+4	31	
5	Liverpool	18	9	2	7	36	27	+9	29	
6	Wembley	18	7	5	6	43	21	+22	26	
7	Millwall Lionesses	18	5	3	10	20	32	−12	18	
8	Ilkeston Town	18	4	3	11	21	46	−25	15	
9	Villa Aztecs (R)	18	4	1	13	22	51	−29	13	Relegation to the Northern Division
10	Wolverhampton Wanderers (R)	18	0	0	18	8	98	−90	0	Relegation to the Northern Division

Source: FA WPL
(C) Champions; (R) Relegated

=== Results ===
Home \ Away	ARS	CRO	DON	EVE	ILK	LIV	MIL	VIL	WEM	WOL
Arsenal	—	1–1	1–2	6–0	7–0	3–0	2–0	4–1	0–0	9–0
Croydon	2–1	—	3–1	2–1	3–1	2–0	5–0	3–0	2–2	7–0
Doncaster Belles	2–2	2–2	—	7–2	3–1	3–1	4–0	2–0	3–0	8–0
Everton	1–2	4–6	0–2	—	3–2	2–1	1–0	3–1	2–1	6–2
Ilkeston Town	0–3	1–6	0–3	2–3	—	1–0	1–2	2–2	3–0	2–0
Liverpool	0–6	1–1	2–3	1–0	3–3	—	3–0	7–0	3–2	4–0
Millwall Lionesses	0–0	0–1	1–6	0–3	0–0	1–2	—	4–0	1–4	5–0
Villa Aztecs	3–1	1–4	1–2	1–2	1–2	1–0	0–3	—	2–1	2–1
Wembley	0–1	0–0	2–1	3–3	4–0	0–1	0–0	7–2	—	8–0
Wolverhampton Wanderers	0–5	1–8	1–3	1–8	0–3	0–6	0–3	2–5	0–6	—

Source: FA WPL
Legend: Blue = home team win; Yellow = draw; Red = away team win.

== Northern Division ==
FA Women's Premier League Northern Division
- Season: 1995–96
- Champions: Tranmere Rovers
- Promoted: Tranmere Rovers
- Matches: 72
- Goals: 329 (4.57 per match)
- Biggest home win: Tranmere Rovers 9–0 Langford (7 April 1996)
- Biggest away win: Bronte 0–10 Huddersfield Town (17 September 1995)
- Longest unbeaten run: Tranmere Rovers (16)
- Longest winless run: Bronte (16)

Map showing the locations of the teams in the Northern Division of the FA Women's Premier League
Map showing the locations of the teams in the Northern Division of the FA Women's Premier League

Changes from last season:

- Villa Aztecs were promoted to the National Division as Champions
- Huddersfield Town promoted to the Northern Division
- Ipswich Town transferred from the Southern Division
- Solihull Borough were relegated
- Cowgate Kestrels became RTM Newcastle Kestrels
- St Helens/Garswood became Garswood St Helens United
- Nottingham Argyle became Notts County

=== League table ===
Pos	Team	Pld	W	D	L	GF	GA	GD	Pts	Promotion or relegation
1	Tranmere Rovers (C, P)	16	14	2	0	73	11	+62	44	Promotion to the National Division
2	Huddersfield Town	16	12	3	1	60	23	+37	39	
3	Garswood St Helens United	16	9	4	3	51	23	+28	31	
4	Sheffield Wednesday	16	9	3	4	41	22	+19	30	
5	Langford	16	6	2	8	27	44	−17	17 (Note: Langford 3 points deducted)	Moved to the Southern Division
6	RTM Newcastle Kestrels	16	3	4	9	21	43	−22	13	
7	Notts County	16	4	1	11	18	43	−25	13	
8	Kidderminster Harriers	16	4	1	11	27	53	−26	13	
9	Bronte	16	0	2	14	11	67	−56	2	

Source: WPL
(C) Champions; (P) Promoted

=== Results ===
Home \ Away	BRO	GAS	HUT	LAN	KIH	NOC	RNK	SHW	TRR
Bronte	—	0–7	0–10	0–1	1–2	2–2	1–3	2–6	0–3
Garswood St Helens United	3–0	—	2–2	4–1	4–1	1–2	4–0	0–0	0–5
Huddersfield Town	6–0	2–2	—	3–2	5–0	6–0	3–1	3–2	3–3
Langford	2–1	1–7	0–2	—	8–1	2–0	1–1	0–2	2–8
Kidderminster Harriers	7–1	2–3	3–5	4–2	—	2–3	2–0	0–3	0–6
Notts County	3–1	1–4	1–4	0–1	1–0	—	1–2	1–4	0–1
RTM Newcastle Kestrels	2–2	2–7	1–2	0–0	2–2	3–2	—	1–2	2–8
Sheffield Wednesday	3–0	2–2	2–3	2–3	6–1	3–0	3–1	—	1–1
Tranmere Rovers	7–0	2–1	4–1	9–0	2–0	7–1	3–0	4–0	—

Source: WPL
Legend: Blue = home team win; Yellow = draw; Red = away team win.

== Southern Division ==
FA Women's Premier League Southern Division
- Season: 1995–96
- Champions: Southampton Saints
- Relegated: Brentford
- Matches: 90
- Goals: 375 (4.17 per match)
- Biggest away win: Oxford United 0–9 Three Bridges (4 February 1996)
- Highest scoring: Wimbledon 5–4 Leyton Orient (21 January 1996)

Map showing the locations of the teams in the Southern Division of the FA Women's Premier League
Map showing the locations of the teams in the Division One South of the WFA National League (Greater London)

Changes from last season:

- Maidstone Tigresses were expunged from the Southern Division
- Leyton Orient were promoted to the Southern Division
- Ipswich Town were transferred to the Southern Division
- Red Star Southampton were relegated from the National Division
- Red Star Southampton became Southampton Saints
- Berkhamsted & Hemel became Berkhamsted Town
- Horsham became Three Bridges

=== League table ===
Pos	Team	Pld	W	D	L	GF	GA	GD	Pts	Promotion or relegation
1	Southampton Saints (C, P)	18	13	2	3	52	21	+31	41	Promotion to the National Division
2	Berkhamsted Town	18	13	1	4	42	26	+16	40	
3	Wimbledon	18	12	1	5	53	36	+17	37	
4	Three Bridges	18	11	1	6	45	23	+22	34	
5	Ipswich Town	18	8	1	9	36	35	+1	25	
6	Brighton & Hove Albion	18	5	4	9	34	45	−11	19	
7	Town & County	18	6	1	11	27	48	−21	19	
8	Leyton Orient	18	5	2	11	33	45	−12	16 (Note: Leyton Orient 1 point deducted)	
9	Oxford United	18	4	4	10	24	46	−22	16	
10	Brentford (R)	18	3	3	12	29	50	−21	12	Relegation

Source: FA WPL
(C) Champions; (P) Promoted; (R) Relegated

=== Results ===
Home \ Away	BET	BRE	BHA	IPT	LEO	OXU	SOS	THB	TAC	WIM
Berkhamsted Town	—	4–1	2–2	0–2	1–0	3–2	1–0	3–2	0–1	3–4
Brentford	1–3	—	0–0	5–2	1–3	0–0	1–5	2–3	2–3	1–2
Brighton & Hove Albion	1–2	1–3	—	4–1	0–0	3–0	1–4	1–5	5–3	3–2
Ipswich Town	0–2	1–0	4–3	—	2–1	3–1	1–3	2–3	6–0	4–0
Leyton Orient	1–3	2–6	4–1	2–3	—	1–2	1–5	2–1	0–3	3–2
Oxford United	3–6	2–2	3–1	2–0	2–3	—	1–1	0–9	0–2	1–4
Southampton Saints	1–2	4–0	6–0	3–1	4–3	1–1	—	2–0	2–1	2–1
Three Bridges	1–2	5–2	3–1	1–1	2–1	2–0	2–1	—	3–0	1–2
Town & County	0–4	3–1	2–5	3–2	2–2	1–3	1–4	0–3	—	1–4
Wimbledon	4–1	7–1	3–3	2–1	5–4	4–1	3–4	2–1	2–1	—

Source: FA WPL
Legend: Blue = home team win; Yellow = draw; Red = away team win.
