= 1990 WFA Cup final =

1990 WFA Cup Final
- Event: 1989–90 WFA Cup
Doncaster Belles	Friends of Fulham
1	0
- Date: 28 April 1990
- Venue: Baseball Ground, Derby
- Referee: D.T. Phillips (Barnsley)
- Attendance: 3,111

The 1990 WFA Cup Final was the 20th final of the WFA Cup, England's primary cup competition for women's football teams. The showpiece event was played under the auspices of the Women's Football Association (WFA). Doncaster Belles and Friends of Fulham contested the match at the Baseball Ground, the former home stadium of Derby County F.C. on 28 April 1990. Doncaster Belles ended up winning the game 1–0.

== Match details ==
28 April 1990

Doncaster Belles	1–0	Friends of Fulham
Coultard 61'	Report

Baseball Ground, Derby
Attendance: 3,111
Referee: D.T. Phillips (Barnsley)

GK	1	(England) Tracey Davidson
DF	2	(England) Julie Chipchase
DF	3	(England) Louise Ryde
DF	4	(England) Jackie Sherrard
DF	5	(England) Loraine Hunt
MF	6	(England) Michelle Jackson
MF	7	(England) Joanne Broadhurst	(substituted off) 80'
MF	8	(England) Gillian Coultard (c)
MF	9	(England) Karen Walker
FW	10	(England) Gail Borman
FW	11	(England) Karen Skillcorn
Substitutes:
DF	12	(England) Yvonne Bagley	(substituted on) 80'
MF	13	(England) Lorraine Young
Manager:
(England) Paul Edmunds

GK	1	(England) Terry Wiseman
DF	2	(Wales) Debbie Fox
DF	3	(England) Mandy O'Callaghan
DF	4	(England) Karen Gale
DF	14	(England) Lori Hoey (c)		(substituted off) 84'
MF	6	(England) Marieanne Spacey
MF	7	(England) Cheryl McAdam		(substituted off) 52'
MF	8	(England) Brenda Sempare
FW	9	(England) Lynn Jacobs
FW	10	(England) Livvy Hughes
MF	11	(England) Fiona Curl
Substitutes:
MF	5	(England) Terri Springett	(yellow card) 75'	(substituted on) 52'
DF	12	(England) Dorrette Wilson		(substituted on) 84'
Manager:
(England) Fred Brockwell

Assistant referees:
G. A. Stones
C. Daxter

Match rules

- 90 minutes.
- 30 minutes of extra-time if necessary.
- Penalty shoot-out if scores still level.
- Five named substitutes.
- Maximum of two substitutions.
