= England women's national football team results (1990–1999) =

- Win Draw Loss

This is a list of the England women's national football team results from 1990 to 1999.

== Results ==
=== 1990 ===
| 17 March 1990 Euro 1991 qualifying group stage | Belgium | 0–3 | England | Ypres, Belgium |
| | | Report | Powell 32', 39'; Sempare 66' | Stadium: Het Minneplein; Referee: Hans-Peter Dellwing (Germany) |

| 7 April 1990 Euro 1991 qualifying group stage | England | 1–0 | Belgium | Sheffield, England |
| | Coultard 63' | Report | | Stadium: Bramall Lane; Referee: Eyjolfur Olafsson (Iceland) |

| 6 May 1990 Friendly | Scotland | 0–4 | England | Paisley, Scotland |
| | | | Curl; Coultard; Walker; Borman | Stadium: Love Street |

| 12 May 1990 Friendly | England | 4–0 | Scotland | London, England |
| | Sherrard; Spacey; (o.g.) | | | Stadium: Wembley Stadium |
Note: Despite only having 20-minute halves, played ahead of the men's FA Cup final, the match is considered a full international by the England FA.

| 27 May 1990 Euro 1991 qualifying group stage | Norway | 2–0 | England | Kleppe, Norway |
| | Medalen 51'; Haugen 76' | Report | | Stadium: Klepp Stadion; Attendance: 604; Referee: Kaj Østergaard (Denmark) |

| 5 August 1990 1990 North America Cup | West Germany | 3–1 | England | Blaine, Minnesota |
| | Lohn; Mohr | | Harper | Stadium: National Sports Center; Referee: Raúl Domínguez (United States |

| 9 August 1990 1990 North America Cup | United States | 3–0 | England | Blaine, Minnesota |
| | Akers; Heinrichs | | | Stadium: National Sports Center; Attendance: 250 |

| 11 August 1990 1990 North America Cup | England | 1–1 | Soviet Union | Blaine, Minnesota |
| | Spacey | | | Stadium: National Sports Center |

| 18 August 1990 Friendly | England | 1–4 | Italy | London, England |
| | Davis | | Morace | Stadium: Wembley Stadium |

| 2 September 1990 Euro 1991 qualifying group stage | England | 0–0 | Norway | Manchester, England |
| | | Report | | Stadium: Old Trafford; Attendance: 435; Referee: Johannes Reijgwaart (Netherlands) |

| 29 September 1990 Euro 1991 qualifying group stage | Finland | 0–0 | England | Tampere, Finland |
| | | | | Stadium: Ratina Stadion; Referee: Klaus Scheurell (Germany) |

| 25 November 1990 Euro 1991 qualifying quarter-final first leg | England | 1–4 | Germany | High Wycombe, England |
| | K. Walker 28' | Report | Mohr 18', 37', 54'; Lohn 34' | Stadium: Adams Park; Attendance: 2,000; Referee: Jaap Uilenberg (Netherlands) |

| 16 December 1990 Euro 1991 qualifying quarter-final second leg | Germany | 2–0 (6–1 agg.) | England | Bochum, Germany |
| | Unsleber 24', 80' | Report | | Stadium: Ruhrstadion; Attendance: 3,051; Referee: Michel Girard (France) |

=== 1991 ===
| 20 April 1991 Friendly | England | 5–0 | Scotland | High Wycombe, England |
| | Spacey; Walker | | | Stadium: Adams Park |

| 25 May 1991 Friendly | England | 1–3 | United States | Hirson, France |
| | Borman | | Heinrichs; Akers; Jennings | Stadium: Stade Des Champs Élysés |

| 28 June 1991 Friendly | Denmark | 0–0 | England | Nordby, Denmark |
| | | | | Stadium: Nordby Stadion; Attendance: 132; Referee: Carl Laursen (Denmark) |

| 30 June 1991 Friendly | Denmark | 3–3 | England | Nordby, Denmark |
| | Gam-Pedersen | | Walker; Spacey; Begg | Stadium: Nordby Stadion; Attendance: 300; Referee: Finn Lambek (Denmark) |

| 20 July 1991 Friendly | Soviet Union | 1–2 | England | Dmitrov, Soviet Union |
| | | | Walker |

| 21 July 1991 Friendly | Soviet Union | 0–2 | England | Kashira, Soviet Union |
| | | | Lambert; Spacey |

| 7 September 1991 Friendly | England | 2–0 | Soviet Union | Southampton, England |
| | Sherrard; Coultard | | | Stadium: The Dell; Attendance: 345 |

| 8 September 1991 Friendly | England | 1–? | Soviet Union | Brighton, England |
| | Spacey | | | Stadium: Goldstone Ground; Attendance: 600 |
Note: The FA reports this as a 1–0 England victory, other sources suggest it was a 1–3 England loss.

=== 1992 ===
| 18 April 1992 Euro 1993 qualifying first round | England | 1–0 | Scotland | Walsall, England |
| | Walker | | | Stadium: Bescot Stadium; Attendance: 435; Referee: John Ferry (Ireland) |

| 17 May 1992 Euro 1993 qualifying first round | England | 4–0 | Iceland | Yeovil, England |
| | Bampton; Walker; Murray (pen.) | Report | | Stadium: Huish Park; Referee: Denis McArdle (Ireland) |

| 19 July 1992 Euro 1993 qualifying first round | Iceland | 1–2 | England | Kópavogur, Iceland |
| | Stefánsdóttir 60' | Report | Walker; Borman | Stadium: Kópavogsvöllur; Referee: Denis McArdle (Ireland) |

| 23 August 1992 Euro 1993 qualifying first round | Scotland | 0–2 | England | Perth, Scotland |
| | | | Borman | Stadium: McDiarmid Park |

| 17 October 1992 Euro 1993 qualifying second round | Italy | 3–2 | England | Solofra, Italy |
| | Morace 37', 43'; Fiorini 54' | Report | Walker 73'; Spacey 78' | Stadium: Stadio Comunale; Referee: Gilles Veissière (France) |

| 7 November 1992 Euro 1993 qualifying second round | England | 0–3 (2–6 agg.) | Italy | Rotherham, England |
| | | Report | Bampton 54' (o.g.); Law 55' (o.g.); Morace 79' | Stadium: Millmoor; Referee: José Mendes Pratas (Portugal) |

=== 1993 ===
| 25 September 1993 Euro 1995 qualifying first round | Slovenia | 0–10 | England | Ljubljana, Slovenia |
| | | | Taylor; Spacey; Borman; Walker; Davis | Stadium: Bežigrad Stadium |

| 6 November 1993 Euro 1995 qualifying first round | Belgium | 0–3 | England | Koksijde, Belgium |
| | | Report | Walker 26', 87'; Taylor 83' | Stadium: Henri Houtsaegerstadion; Referee: Tore Hollung (Norway) |

| 19 December 1993 Euro 1995 qualifying first round | Spain | 0–0 | England | Pamplona, Spain |
| | | | | Stadium: Estadio El Sadar |

=== 1994 ===
| 20 February 1994 Euro 1995 qualifying first round | England | 0–0 | Spain | Bradford, England |
| | | | | Stadium: Valley Parade; Referee: Bragi Bergmann (Iceland) |

| 13 March 1994 Euro 1995 qualifying first round | England | 6–0 | Belgium | Nottingham, England |
| | Walker; Spacey; Davis; Coultard | Report | | Stadium: City Ground; Referee: Terje Hauge (Norway) |

| 17 April 1994 Euro 1995 qualifying first round | England | 10–0 | Slovenia | Brentford, England |
| | Taylor; Walker; Britton; Coultard; Powell; Borman; Spacey | | | Stadium: Griffin Park |

| 8 October 1994 Euro 1995 qualifying second round | Iceland | 1–2 | England | Reykjavík, Iceland |
| | Ólafsdóttir 31' | Report | Coultard 5'; Davis 61' | Stadium: Laugardalsvöllur; Attendance: 600; Referee: Timo Keltanen (Finland) |

| 30 October 1994 Euro 1995 qualifying second round | England | 2–1 (4–2 agg.) | Iceland | Brighton, England |
| | Coultard 13'; Spacey 65' | Report | Gunnlaugsdóttir 36' | Stadium: Goldstone Ground; Attendance: 2,000; Referee: Richard O'Hanlon (Ireland) |

| 11 December 1994 Euro 1995 semi-final first leg | England | 1–4 | Germany | Watford, England |
| | Farley 7' | Report | Mohr 32', 80'; Brocker 68'; Wiegmann 87' (pen.) | Stadium: Vicarage Road; Attendance: 800; Referee: Sándor Piller (Hungary) |

=== 1995 ===
| 26 January 1995 Friendly | Italy | 1–1 | England | Florence, Italy |
| | Morace 56' | RSSSF | Farley 89' |

| 23 February 1995 Euro 1995 semi-final second leg | Germany | 2–1 (6–2 agg.) | England | Bochum, Germany |
| | Waller 34' (o.g.); Prinz 79' | Report | Farley 1' | Stadium: Ruhrstadion; Attendance: 7,000; Referee: Kostadin Guerginov (Bulgaria) |
Note: Germany won 6–2 on aggregate

| 13 May 1995 Friendly | Sweden | 4–0 | England | Halmstad, Sweden |
| | Kalte; Sundhage; Andelén; (o.g.) | | | Stadium: Örjans Vall; Attendance: 427 |

| 6 June 1995 1995 World Cup group stage | England | 3–2 | Canada | Helsingborg, Sweden |
| | Coultard 51' (pen.), 85'; Spacey 76' (pen.) | Report | Stoumbos 87'; Donnelly 90+1' | Stadium: Olympiastadion; Attendance: 655; Referee: Eva Ödlund (Sweden) |

| 8 June 1995 1995 World Cup group stage | Norway | 2–0 | England | Karlstad, Sweden |
| | Haugen 7'; Riise 37' | Report | | Stadium: Tingvalla IP; Attendance: 5,520; Referee: Eduardo Gamboa (Chile) |

| 10 June 1995 1995 World Cup group stage | Nigeria | 2–3 | England | Karlstad, Sweden |
| | Okoroafor 13'; Nwadike 74' | Report | Farley 10', 38'; Walker 27' | Stadium: Tingvalla IP; Attendance: 1,843; Referee: Ingrid Jonsson (Sweden) |

| 13 June 1995 1995 World Cup quarter-final | Germany | 3–0 | England | Västerås, Sweden |
| | Voss 41'; Meinert 55'; Mohr 82' | Report | | Stadium: Arosvallen; Attendance: 2,317; Referee: Bente Skogvang (Norway) |

| 1 November 1995 Euro 1997 qualifying | England | 1–1 | Italy | Sunderland, England |
| | Coultard 33' | Report | Morace 44' | Stadium: Roker Park; Referee: Christine Frai (Germany) |

| 19 November 1995 Euro 1997 qualifying | England | 5–0 | Croatia | Charlton, England |
| | Farley; Walker; K. Smith (pen.) | Report | | Stadium: The Valley |

=== 1996 ===
| 11 February 1996 Euro 1997 qualifying | Portugal | 0–5 | England | Benavente, Portugal |
| | | Report | Powell 25'; Farley 33'; Coultard 48'; Catterall 76'; Burke 89' | Stadium: Campo de Jogos Portas do Sol; Referee: Regina Belksma-Konink (Netherlands) |

| 16 March 1996 Euro 1997 qualifying | Italy | 2–1 | England | Cosenza, Italy |
| | Carta 50'; Morace 59' | Report | K. Smith 43' | Stadium: Stadio San Vito; Referee: Florence Guyot (France) |

| 18 April 1996 Euro 1997 qualifying | Croatia | 0–2 | England | Osijek, Croatia |
| | | Report | | Stadium: Gradski Vrt Stadium; Attendance: 1,617 |

| 19 May 1996 Euro 1997 qualifying | England | 3–0 | Portugal | Brentford, England |
| | Davis 9', 54'; Smith 38' | Report | | Stadium: Griffin Park; Referee: Bente Skogvang (Norway) |

| 8 September 1996 Euro 1997 qualifying playoff | Spain | 2–1 | England | Córdoba, Spain |
| | | | Powell | Stadium: Instituto Municipal de Deportes El Fontanar |

| 29 September 1996 Euro 1997 qualifying playoff | England | 1–1 (2–3 agg.) | Spain | Tranmere, England |
| | Harper | | | Stadium: Prenton Park; Attendance: 4,500 |

=== 1997 ===
| 27 February 1997 Friendly | England | 4–6 | Germany | Preston, England |
| | Coultard; Powell; S. Smith | | Wunderlich; Müller; Cottier (o.g.) | Stadium: Deepdale; Attendance: 1,500; Referee: Stephen Lodge (England) |

| 9 March 1997 Friendly | England | 6–0 | Scotland | Sheffield, England |
| | Broadhurst; Coultard; Marley | | | Stadium: Bramall Lane |

| 23 April 1997 Friendly | Italy | 2–0 | England | Turin, Italy |
| | Carta; Ulivi | | | Stadium: Ruffini Stadium; Attendance: 1,100; Referee: Christina Gozzi de Terni (Italy) |

| 9 May 1997 Friendly | United States | 5–0 | England | San Jose, California |
| | MacMillan 36'; Hamm 45+1', 51', 60'; Foudy 81' | | | Stadium: Spartan Stadium |

| 11 May 1997 Friendly | United States | 6–0 | England | Portland, Oregon |
| | Hamm; Parlow; Milbrett; Lilly; Keller | | | Stadium: Merlo Field |

| 8 June 1997 Friendly | Norway | 4–0 | England | Lillestrøm, Norway |
| | Espeseth; Medalen; Støre | | | Stadium: Åråsen Stadion; Attendance: 1,005; Referee: Ingrid Jonsson (Swe) |

| 23 August 1997 Friendly | Scotland | 0–4 | England | Livingston, Scotland |
| | | | Davis; Britton; Yankey | Stadium: Almondvale Stadium |

| 25 September 1997 1999 World Cup qualifying | Germany | 3–0 | England | Dessau, Germany |
| | Meyer; Prinz; Smisek | | | Stadium: Paul Greifzu Stadium |

| 30 October 1997 1999 World Cup qualifying | England | 1–0 | Netherlands | Upton Park, England |
| | S. Smith 60' | | | Stadium: Boleyn Ground; Attendance: 2,002; Referee: Asim Khudiev (Azerbaijan) |

=== 1998 ===
| 15 February 1998 Friendly | France | 3–2 | England | Alençon, France |
| | Pichon; Lattaf | | Davis; Burke | Stadium: Stade Jacques Fould; Attendance: 1,300; Referee: Jacky Legrain (France) |

| 8 March 1998 1999 World Cup qualifying | England | 0–1 | Germany | Millwall, England |
| | | | Smisek | Stadium: The Den; Attendance: 4,917; Referee: Eva Ödlund (Sweden) |

| 21 April 1998 Friendly | England | 1–2 | Italy | West Bromwich, England |
| | White | | Sberti; Maglio | Stadium: The Hawthorns; Attendance: 2,002; Referee: Don Reed (England) |

| 14 May 1998 1999 World Cup qualifying | England | 1–2 | Norway | Oldham, England |
| | White | | Knudsen; Haugenes | Stadium: Boundary Park; Attendance: 2,380; Referee: Valery Onupea |

| 23 May 1998 1999 World Cup qualifying | Netherlands | 2–1 | England | Waalwijk, Netherlands |
| | Noom | | Walker | Stadium: Sportpark Olympia; Attendance: 1,300; Referee: Mammedov Khagani (Azerbaijan) |

| 27 July 1998 Friendly | England | 0–1 | Sweden | Dagenham, England |
| | | | Moström | Stadium: Victoria Road; Attendance: 650 |

| 15 August 1998 1999 World Cup qualifying | Norway | 2–0 | England | Lillestrøm, Norway |
| | Petterssen; Sanduane | | | Stadium: Åråsen Stadion; Attendance: 1,054; Referee: Jaraslav Jara (Czech Republic) |

| 13 September 1998 1999 World Cup qualifying relegation playoff first leg | Romania | 1–4 | England | Câmpina, Romania |
| | | | Yankey; S. Smith; Walker | Stadium: Stadionul Poiana |

| 11 October 1998 1999 World Cup qualifying relegation playoff second leg | England | 2–1 (6–2 agg.) | Romania | High Wycombe, England |
| | Walker; Broadhurst | | | Stadium: Adams Park |

=== 1999 ===
| 26 May 1999 Friendly | Italy | 4–1 | England | Lugo, Italy |
| | Carta; Panico | | Walker | Stadium: Stadio Ermes Muccinelli; Referee: Tiziana Calamosca (Italy) |

| 22 August 1999 Friendly | Denmark | 0–1 | England | Odense, Denmark |
| | | | Walker | Stadium: Odense Stadion; Attendance: 850; Referee: Lotte Rye Wæde (Denmark) |

| 15 September 1999 Friendly | England | 0–1 | France | Yeovil, England |
| | | | Mugneret-Béghé | Stadium: Huish Park; Attendance: 1,021; Referee: Eva Ödlund (Sweden) |

| 16 October 1999 Euro 2001 qualifying | Switzerland | 0–3 | England | Zofingen, Switzerland |
| | | | Walker; Burke; S. Smith | Stadium: Sportanlagen Trinermatten; Attendance: 800; Referee: Anders Mattsson (Finland) |
