= 1991–92 WFA Cup =

Tournament details
- Country: England & Wales

Final positions
- Champions: Doncaster Belles
- Runners-up: Red Star Southampton
- Penalty shoot-outs do not count towards the total number of goals.

The 1991–92 WFA Cup was an association football knockout tournament for women's teams, held between 15 September 1991 and 25 April 1992. It was the 22nd season of the WFA Cup and was won by Doncaster Belles, who defeated Red Star Southampton in the final.

The tournament consisted eight rounds of competition proper.

All match results and dates from the Women's FA Cup Website.

== Group 1 ==
=== First round proper ===
All games were scheduled for 15 September 1991.

Tie	Home team (tier)	Score	Away team (tier)	Att.
1	Bridgwater	0–15	Cardiff	
2	Carterton	2–8	Launton	
3	Cheltenham	2–3	Bournemouth	
4	Cirencester	0–4	Frome	
5	Exeter Rangers	0–6	Oxford	
6	Plymouth Pilgrims	2–5	Bristol Backwell	
7	Salisbury	1–3	Solent	
8	Swindon Spitfires	3–4	Newquay	
9	Taunton Trident	1–8	Crewkerne	
10	Torquay United	11–0	Amazons	
11	Truro City	6–1	Bristol United	
12	Warmplas Windows	1–3	Swansea	

=== Second round proper ===
All games were originally scheduled for 6 October 1991.

Tie	Home team (tier)	Score	Away team (tier)	Att.
1	Bournemouth	5–0	Cardiff	
2	Bristol Backwell	10–1	Torquay United	
3	Crewkerne	5–3	Launton	
4	Oxford	2–2 (a.e.t.)	Truro City	
replay	Truro City	0–3	Oxford	
5	Solent	3–2	Newcastle	
6	Swansea	0–5	Frome	

=== Third round proper ===
All games were originally scheduled for 3 and 10 November 1991.

Tie	Home team (tier)	Score	Away team (tier)	Att.
1	Bristol Backwell	7–0	Bournemouth	
2	Oxford	2–3	Frome	
3	Solent	11–0	Crewkerne	

== Group 2 ==
=== First round proper ===
All games were scheduled for 15 September 1991.

Tie	Home team (tier)	Score	Away team (tier)	Att.
1	Beccles	4–6	Chelmsford City	
2	Leyton Orient	7–0	Sporting Kesteven	
3	Luton Town	1–2	Pye	
4	Newham	3–1	Bedford Town Bells	
5	Romford	A–W	Canary Rangers	
Walkover for Canary Rangers
6	Thetford	0–10	Suffolk Bluebirds	
7	Tower Hamlets	A–W	Norwich Falcons	
Walkover for Norwich Falcons
8	Wanstead	0–0 (a.e.t.)	Harlow	
replay	Harlow	4–0	Wanstead	
Bye: Hornchurch, Milton Keynes, Town & County

=== Second round proper ===
All games were originally scheduled for 6 October 1991.

Tie	Home team (tier)	Score	Away team (tier)	Att.
1	Canary Rangers	3–2	Suffolk Bluebirds	
2	Harlow Town	4–1	Milton Keynes	
3	Hornchurch	3–8	Town & County	
4	Leyton Orient	6–2	Chelmsford City	
5	Norwich Falcons	2–5	Spondon	
6	Pye	5–1	Newham	

=== Third round proper ===
All games were originally scheduled for 3 and 10 November 1991.

Tie	Home team (tier)	Score	Away team (tier)	Att.
1	Canary Rangers	0–7	Leyton Orient	
2	Harlow Town	2–0	Spondon	
3	Pye	5–3	Town & County	

== Group 3 ==
=== First round proper ===
All games were scheduled for 15 September 1991.

Tie	Home team (tier)	Score	Away team (tier)	Att.
1	Barnsley	2–5	Wakefield	
2	Bradford City	4–1	Hull City	
3	Middlesbrough	3–0	Brighouse	
4	Newcastle	2–1	Doncaster Town	
5	Scarborough	4–1	Oakland Rangers	
Bye: Bronte, Cowgate Kestrels, Sunderland

=== Second round proper ===
All games were originally scheduled for 6 October 1991.

Tie	Home team (tier)	Score	Away team (tier)	Att.
1	Bradford City	1–3	Middlesbrough	
2	Scarborough	1–4	Bronte	
3	Sunderland	1–4	Cowgate Kestrels	
4	Wakefield	0–1	Newcastle	

=== Third round proper ===
All games were originally scheduled for 3 and 10 November 1991.

Tie	Home team (tier)	Score	Away team (tier)	Att.
1	Cowgate Kestrels	2–4	Middlesbrough	
2	Newcastle	2–3	Bronte	

== Group 4 ==
=== First round proper ===
All games were scheduled for 15 September 1991.

Tie	Home team (tier)	Score	Away team (tier)	Att.
1	Highfield Rangers	0–2	Leicester	
2	Leighton Linslade	0–6	Calverton	
3	Millmoor	28–0	Gresley Rovers	
4	Notts County	3–1	Nettleham	
5	Rainworth Miners Welfare	A–W	Derby City	
Walkover for Derby City
6	Sharley Park Spireites	6–0	Derby County	
Bye: Slough, Spondon

=== Second round proper ===
All games were originally scheduled for 6 October 1991.

Tie	Home team (tier)	Score	Away team (tier)	Att.
1	Millmoor	4–1	Calverton	
2	Sharley Park Spireites	3–2	Leicester	
3	Slough	11–0	Notts County	
4	Spondon	7–1	Derby City	

=== Third round proper ===
All games were originally scheduled for 3 and 10 November 1991.

Tie	Home team (tier)	Score	Away team (tier)	Att.
1	Sharley Park Spireites	0–4	Spondon	
2	Sheffield Wednesday	1–2	Millmoor	

== Group 5 ==
=== First round proper ===
All games were scheduled for 15 September 1991.

Tie	Home team (tier)	Score	Away team (tier)	Att.
1	Bolton	1–2	Nabwood Athletic	
2	Bury	0–3	Preston Rangers	
3	Liverpool Feds	0–9	Wythenshawe	
4	Manchester City	1–4	Huddersfield	
5	Manchester Corinthians	1–6	Runcorn	
6	Manchester United	H–W	St Martins	
Walkover for Manchester United
7	Rochdale	1–6	Broadoak	
8	Rossendale	1–2	Tranmere Rovers	
9	St Helens	12–0	Pilkington	
10	Vernon–Carus	0–1	Ladyblues	
11	Wigan	4–0	Burnley	
Bye: Blackpool

=== Second round proper ===
All games were originally scheduled for 6 October 1991.

Tie	Home team (tier)	Score	Away team (tier)	Att.
1	Broadoak	2–4	Tranmere Rovers	
2	Ladyblues	4–5 (a.e.t.)	Huddersfield	
3	Preston Rangers	10–1	Wythenshawe	
4	Runcorn	1–3	Manchester United	
5	St Helens	2–0	Blackpool	
6	Wigan	9–0	Nabwood Athletic	

=== Third round proper ===
All games were originally scheduled for 3 and 10 November 1991.

Tie	Home team (tier)	Score	Away team (tier)	Att.
1	Preston Rangers	3–0	Huddersfield	
2	Tranmere Rovers	3–4	Manchester United	
3	Wigan	1–4	St Helens	

== Group 6 ==
=== First round proper ===
All games were scheduled for 15 September 1991.

Tie	Home team (tier)	Score	Away team (tier)	Att.
1	Abbey Rangers	1–9	Corematch	
2	Farnborough	4–4 (a.e.t.)	Saltdean United	
replay	Saltdean United	3–1	Farnborough	
3	Isle of Wight	25–1	Crowborough	
4	Palace Eagles	5–0	Winchester	
5	Portsmouth	2–5	Hightown	
Bye: Brighton & Hove Albion, Bromley Borough, Crystal Palace, Gosport, Hassocks Beacon, Havant, Maidstone United

=== Second round proper ===
All games were originally scheduled for 6 October 1991.

Tie	Home team (tier)	Score	Away team (tier)	Att.
1	Crystal Palace	2–8	Hassocks Beacon	
2	Havant	0–2	Hightown	
3	Isle of Wight	1–3	Corematch	
4	Maidstone United	0–11	Bromley Borough	
5	Palace Eagles	1–5	Brighton & Hove Albion	
6	Saltdean United	4–1	Gosport	

=== Third round proper ===
All games were originally scheduled for 3 and 10 November 1991.

Tie	Home team (tier)	Score	Away team (tier)	Att.
1	Bromley Borough	6–0	Corematch	
2	Hassocks Beacon	6–2	Brighton & Hove Albion	
3	Hightown	0–2	Saltdean United	

== Group 7 ==
=== First round proper ===
All games were scheduled for 15 September 1991.

Tie	Home team (tier)	Score	Away team (tier)	Att.
1	Brentford	4–0	Yeading	
2	District Line	4–0	Slough	
3	Dunstable	10–0	Walton & Hersham	
4	Hammersmith	0–24	Watford	
5	Reading	0–1	Wycombe Wanderers	
Bye: Bedfont United, Binfield, Broadbridge Heath, Hemel Hempstead, Reigate, Tottenham

=== Second round proper ===
All games were originally scheduled for 6 October 1991.

Tie	Home team (tier)	Score	Away team (tier)	Att.
1	Binfield	1–0	Watford	
2	Brentford	2–10	Cheltenham	
3	Broadbridge Heath	3–4	Reigate	
4	Hemel Hempstead	1–4	District Line	
5	Tottenham	14–0	Bedfont United	
6	Wycombe Wanderers	0–3	Dunstable	

=== Third round proper ===
All games were originally scheduled for 3 and 10 November 1991.

Tie	Home team (tier)	Score	Away team (tier)	Att.
1	Cheltenham	1–3	Binfield	
2	District Line	7–0	Tottenham	
3	Reigate	2–0	Dunstable	

== Group 8 ==
=== First round proper ===
All games were scheduled for 15 September 1991.

Tie	Home team (tier)	Score	Away team (tier)	Att.
1	Birmingham City	2–4	Crewe	
2	Kidderminster Harriers	20–0	Port Vale	
3	Leek Town	8–2	Telford United	
4	St Asaphs	0–5	Aston Villa	
5	Worcester City	4–1	Barnsley	
Bye: Abbeydale, Villa Aztecs, Wolverhampton

=== Second round proper ===
All games were originally scheduled for 6 October 1991.

Tie	Home team (tier)	Score	Away team (tier)	Att.
1	Crewe	5–0	Villa Aztecs	
2	Leek Town	3–7	Kidderminster Harriers	
3	Wolverhampton	0–3	Abbeydale	
4	Worcester City	2–3	Aston Villa	

=== Third round proper ===
All games were originally scheduled for 3 and 10 November 1991.

Tie	Home team (tier)	Score	Away team (tier)	Att.
1	Abbeydale	7–2	Kidderminster Harriers	
2	Aston Villa	1–3	Crewe	

== Fourth round proper ==
All games were originally scheduled for 1 and 8 December 1991.

1 December 1991	Arsenal (2)	0–1 (a.e.t.)	Red Star Southampton (1)	Leyton
		Report	112'	Stadium: Hare & Hounds Ground; Referee: M. Robinson (Middlesex)

1 December 1991	Binfield (3)	0–3	Reigate (2)
		Report	Hiscock 15', 17', 52'

1 December 1991	Bromley Borough (3)	3–3 (a.e.t.)	Abbeydale Alvechurch (2)
	Goal	Report	Goal

8 December 1991 Replay	Abbeydale Alvechurch (2)	0–1	Bromley Borough (3)
		Report	Goal

1 December 1991	Bronte (1)	0–0 (a.e.t.)	Maidstone Tigresses (1)
		Report

8 December 1991 Replay	Maidstone Tigresses (1)	2–1	Bronte (1)	Maidstone
	Bowling	Report	Goal	Stadium: Giddyhorn Lane

1 December 1991	Crewe (3)	1–5	District Line (3)
	Goal	Report	Goal

1 December 1991	Harlow Town (3)	1–6	Wimbledon (1)
	Goal	Report	Spacey; Hoey; Springett; Hughes

1 December 1991	Hassocks Beacon (2)	2–1	Bristol Backwell (3)	Haywards Heath
	Pratt 40'; Quacoe 83'	Report	87'	Stadium: Hanbury Park

1 December 1991	Ipswich Town (1)	3–1	Millwall Lionesses (1)
	Goal	Report	Goal

1 December 1991	Leasowe Pacific (3)	5–0	Millmoor (3)
	Goal	Report

1 December 1991	Leyton Orient (3)	0–14	Doncaster Belles (1)
		Report	Jackson 7'; Borman; Walker; Murray; Sherrard; Coultard

1 December 1991	Middlesbrough (3)	5–0	Frome (3)
	Goal	Report

1 December 1991	Notts Rangers (1)	2–0	Davies Argyle (2)
	Goal	Report

1 December 1991	Preston Rangers (3)	4–2	Manchester United (3)
	Goal	Report	Goal

1 December 1991	Saltdean United (3)	4–0	Pye (3)
	Mead 15' 46' 60'	Report

1 December 1991	Solent (3)	1–3	Spondon (2)
	Goal	Report	Goodman; Staley

1 December 1991	St Helens (3)	2–6	Knowsley United (1)
	Goal	Report	Harper; Ryde

== Fifth round proper ==
All games were played on 2 and 9 February 1992.

2 February 1992	Ipswich Town (1)	5–2	Reigate (2)
	Kemp 50'; Wood 62', 87'; Keeble 79'; Farrow 75' (pen.)	Report	Hiscock 51'; Hudson 83'

2 February 1992	Notts Rangers (1)	2–4	Hassocks Beacon (2)
	Bourne 68'; Phelan 76'	Report	Saunders 8'; Pratt 30'; Carroll 72'; Simpson 90'

2 February 1992	Preston Rangers (3)	0–6	Doncaster Belles (1)
		Report	Walker 8', 27', 72', 82'; Borman 70'; Hunt 75'

2 February 1992	Red Star Southampton (1)	5–2 (a.e.t.)	Bromley Borough (3)	Fareham
	Sunbury 80', 114'; Fisher 88'; Chapman 104', 120'	Report	Powell 36', 84'	Stadium: Cam Alders

2 February 1992	Spondon (2)	4–0	Saltdean United (3)	Ilkeston
	Goodman 10', 13'; Staley 44' (pen.); Newham 88'	Report		Stadium: Hallam Fields; Attendance: 100

2 February 1992	Wimbledon (1)	1–0	District Line (3)	Wimbledon
	Spacey 30'	Report		Stadium: Plough Lane; Referee: S. Kelly (Leyton)

9 February 1992	Maidstone Tigresses (1)	3–2	Knowsley United (1)	Maidstone
	Inglis 26', 76'; Jackson 51'	Report	Harper 2', 20'	Stadium: Giddyhorn Lane

9 February 1992	Middlesbrough (3)	2–3	Leasowe Pacific (3)
	Hogan; Dodd	Report	Bernstein; Stewart

== Quarter–finals ==
All games were played on 1 March 1992.

1 March 1992	Hassocks Beacon (2)	1–6	Wimbledon (2)	Lewes
	Saunders 60' (pen.)	Report	Spacey 27', 45', 88'; Curl 51'; Hughes 87', 89'	Stadium: The Dripping Pan; Attendance: 377

1 March 1992	Ipswich Town (1)	1–3	Red Star Southampton (1)
	Kemp 47'	Report	Chapman 60', 87'; Sunbury 67'

1 March 1992	Leasowe Pacific (3)	1–5	Doncaster Belles (1)	Moreton
	Thomas 46'	Report	Borman 10', 57'; Walker 14', 65', 88'	Stadium: Cuemasters Ground

1 March 1992	Maidstone Tigresses (1)	2–1	Spondon (2)	Maidstone
	Proctor 52'; Clancy 80'	Report	Smith 90'	Stadium: Giddyhorn Lane; Attendance: 215; Referee: S Christie

== Semi–finals ==
All games were played on 11 April 1992.

11 April 2007	Maidstone Tigresses (1)	1–10	Doncaster Belles (1)	Yeovil
11:00 BST	Jackson	Report	Walker; Borman; Sherrard; Hunt; (o.g.)	Stadium: Huish Park; Referee: J. Findley (Hampshire)

11 April 2007	Wimbledon (1)	0–2	Red Star Southampton (1)	Yeovil
14:30 BST		Report	Stanbury; Kaile	Stadium: Huish Park; Referee: R. Martin (Essex)

== Final ==
25 April 1992
14:30 BST

Doncaster Belles	4–0	Red Star Southampton
Coultard 38'; Walker 47', 65', 78'	Report

Prenton Park, Birkenhead
Attendance: 250
Referee: M. Scott (Tyne & Wear)
