= 1991 WFA Cup final =

1991 WFA Cup Final
- Event: 1990–91 WFA Cup
Millwall Lionesses	Doncaster Belles
1	0
- Date: 27 May 1991
- Venue: Prenton Park, Birkenhead
- Referee: Bob Nixon (Wirral)
- Attendance: 4,010

The 1991 WFA Cup Final was the 21st final of the WFA Cup, England's primary cup competition for women's football teams. The showpiece event was played under the auspices of the Women's Football Association (WFA). Millwall Lionesses and Doncaster Belles contested the match at the Prenton Park, the home stadium of Tranmere Rovers F.C. on 27 Mayl 1991. Millwall won the game 1–0 with a goal by Yvonne Baldeo.

== Match details ==
27 May 1991
14:00 BST

Millwall Lionesses	1–0	Doncaster Belles
Baldeo 65'	Report

Prenton Park, Birkenhead
Attendance: 4,010
Referee: Bob Nixon (Wirral)

GK	1	(England) Lesley Higgs
DF	2	(England) Maria Luckhurst
DF	3	(England) Tina Mapes
MF	4	(England) Hope Powell
DF	5	(England) Sue Law
MF	6	(New Zealand) Maureen Jacobson
DF	7	(England) Louise Waller
MF	8	(England) Debbie Bampton (c)
FW	9	(Wales) Jane Bartley
FW	10	(England) Lynne McCormick
MF	11	(England) Yvonne Baldeo	(substituted off) 84'
Substitutes:
FW	12	(England) Karen Farley	(substituted on) 84'
DF	14	(England) Julie Fletcher
DF	15	(England) Anita Dines
DF	16	(England) Keeley Salvage
MF	17	(Republic of Ireland) Raeltine Shrieves
Manager:
(England) Alan Wooler

GK	1	(England) Tracey Davidson
DF	2	(England) Julie Chipchase
DF	3	(England) Yvonne Bagley
MF	4	(England) Jackie Sherrard
DF	5	(England) Lorraine Hunt
DF	6	(England) Michelle Jackson
MF	7	(England) Joanne Broadhurst
MF	8	(England) Gillian Coultard (c)
FW	9	(England) Karen Walker
FW	10	(England) Gail Borman
MF	11	(England) Janice Murray
Substitutes:
FW	14	(England) Lorraine Young
DF	15	(England) Clare Large
MF	16	(England) Sue Herring
FW	17	(England) Sheila Edmunds
DF	18	(England) Karen Day
Manager:
(England) Paul Edmunds

Assistant referees:
J. J. Richardson
V. R. Andrews

Match rules

- 90 minutes.
- 30 minutes of extra-time if necessary.
- Penalty shoot-out if scores still level.
- Five named substitutes.
- Maximum of two substitutions.

== Broadcast ==
The final was broadcast on Channel 4.
