= Tracy Doe =

English footballer

Personal information
- Positions: Midfielder; forward

Senior career*
Years	Team	Apps	(Gls)
- Howbury Grange

International career
1980-82	England	12	(5)

Managerial career
- Brighton & Hove Albion
- * Club domestic league appearances and goals

Tracy Doe is a former England women's international footballer and Women's FA Cup winner.

== Club career ==
Doe's greatest achievement was winning the 1984 Women's FA Cup final with Howbury Grange. They beat Doncaster Belles 4-2 at Sincil Bank

Since retiring from playing Doe became the elite women and girls football manager of Brighton & Hove Albion W.F.C. In 2016 it was announced that she had been dismissed after a disciplinary hearing.

== International career ==
Tracey Doe represented England 12 times and scored 5 times. In November 2022, Doe was recognized by The Football Association as one of the England national team's legacy players, and as the 51st women's player to be capped by England.

== Honours ==
Howbury Grange

- FA Women's Cup: 1984
