= 1988 WFA Cup final =

1987 WFA Cup Final
- The match programme cover
- Event: 1987–88 WFA Cup
Leasowe Pacific	Doncaster Belles
1	3
- Date: 1 May 1988
- Venue: Gresty Road, Crewe
- Referee: Philip Wright (Crewe)
- Attendance: 800

The 1988 WFA Cup Final was the 18th final of the WFA Cup, England's primary cup competition for women's football teams. The showpiece event was played under the auspices of the Women's Football Association (WFA). Doncaster Belles and Leasowe Pacific contested the match on 1 May 1988 at Gresty Road, the home stadium of Crewe Alexandra. Doncaster ended up winning the game 3–1.

== Match details ==
1 May 1988

Leasowe Pacific	1–3	Doncaster Belles
Jackson pen'	Report	Walker; Coultard; Sherrard

Gresty Road, Crewe
Attendance: 800
Referee: Philip Wright (Crewe)

GK	1	(England) Pauline Rimmer
DF	2	(England) Gill Griffiths
DF	3	(England) Cathy Gore
DF	4	(England) Joy McQuiggan
DF	5	(England) Jill Thomas
MF	6	(England) Liz McDonald
MF	7	(England) Dianne Coughlin
MF	8	(England) Janice Murray
FW	9	(England) Maria Harper
FW	10	(Wales) Louise Thomas (c)
MF	11	(England) Michelle Jackson
Substitutes:
DF	12	(England) Jill Salisbury
DF	13	(Wales) Deborah Faulkner
Manager:
(England) Billy Jackson

GK	1	(England) Tracey Davidson
DF	2	(England) Doreen Jones
DF	3	(England) Louise Ryde
DF	4	(England) Lorraine Hanson (c)
DF	5	(England) Loraine Hunt
MF	6	(England) Joanne Broadhurst
FW	7	(England) Gail Borman
MF	8	(England) Gillian Coultard
FW	9	(England) Karen Walker
MF	10	(England) Jackie Sherrard
MF	11	(England) Karen Skillcorn
Substitutes:
MF	12	(England) Toni Evans
MF	13	(England) Sheila Edmunds
Manager:
(England) Mick Sherrard
