= Theresa Wiseman =

English footballer and animator

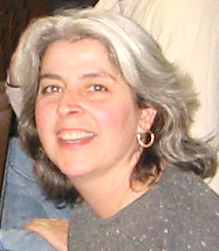
- Theresa Wiseman in 2003

Personal information
- Date of birth: 1956 (age 69–70)
- Position: Goalkeeper

Senior career*
Years	Team	Apps	(Gls)
- Howbury Grange
- Friends of Fulham

International career
1978-1991	England	68	(0)
- * Club domestic league appearances and goals

Theresa "Terry" Wiseman (born 1956) is an English animator and former footballer. She played as a goalkeeper and represented England at senior international level. She won the Women's FA Cup twice during her club career. She is also a noted animator, having worked on many animated films for Walt Disney Animation and other studios.

== Career ==
Wiseman won 68 caps for England. After a period as understudy to England's original goalkeeper Sue Buckett, Wiseman made her debut on 23 July 1979, in a 2–0 win over Switzerland held in Sorrento, Italy during an unofficial European Championship. Ten years later she made her 50th appearance in a 2–0 home friendly defeat to Sweden. The match was held at Wembley Stadium to mark the 20th anniversary of the Women's Football Association (WFA), played as a curtain–raiser to the male national team's Rous Cup game against Chile. She had played in the penalty shootout defeat to Sweden in the 1984 European Competition for Women's Football final.

At club level she played for Tottenham Hotspur's women's section and represented Friends of Fulham in the victorious 1985 WFA Cup final against Doncaster Belles, the 1989 final defeat to Leasowe Pacific and the 1990 WFA Cup final defeat to Doncaster Belles. Wiseman also won the WFA Cup in 1984 with Howbury Grange when they defeated Doncaster Belles 4-2 at Sincil Bank.

People should remember and respect there was a game before 1993, that pioneers built the foundations and paved the way for what is happening now. There were so many talented players, like [Terry] Wiseman (England and Fulham goalkeeper). She was a mentor to me, I learnt so much off her.

— Marieanne Spacey speaking to On the Ball magazine.

In November 2022, Wiseman was recognized by The Football Association as one of the England national team's legacy players, and as the 45th women's player to be capped by England.

== Post-football career ==
In her other career as an animator Wiseman worked on The Snowman and later moved to Los Angeles County to work for DisneyToon Studios, recently working as a timing director on Phineas and Ferb. She trained at Hornsey College of Art.

== Honours ==
Howbury Grange

- FA Women's Cup: 1983-84
