= 1985 WFA Cup final =

1985 WFA Cup Final
- Event: 1984–85 WFA Cup
Friends of Fulham	Doncaster Belles
2	0
- Date: 12 May 1985
- Venue: Craven Cottage, Fulham
- Player of the Match: Brenda Sempare (Friends of Fulham)
- Referee: Darryl Reeves (Uxbridge)
- Attendance: 925
- Weather: Cold and wet

The 1985 WFA Cup Final was the 15th final of the WFA Cup, England's primary cup competition for women's football teams. The showpiece event was played under the auspices of the Women's Football Association (WFA). Friends of Fulham and Doncaster Belles contested the match at Craven Cottage, the home stadium of Fulham F.C. on 12 May 1985. Friends of Fulham ended up winning the game 2–0.

== Match details ==
12 May 1985
14:30 BST

Friends of Fulham	2–0	Doncaster Belles
McAdam 22'; Hynes 25'	Report

Craven Cottage, Fulham
Attendance: 925
Referee: Darryl Reeves (Uxbridge)

GK	1	(England) Terry Wiseman
DF	2	(England) Lori Hoey
DF	3	(England) Carmen Sandman
MF	4	(Republic of Ireland) Noreen O'Flyn	Substituted off
DF	5	(England) Sallie Jackson
MF	6	(England) Brenda Sempare
DF	7	(Wales) Gill Maskell (c)
MF	8	(Republic of Ireland) Cathy Hynes
MF	9	(England) Marieanne Spacey
FW	10	(England) Cheryl McAdam
FW	11	(England) Fiona Curl
Substitutes:
MF	12	(England) Lynne Jacobs
MF	13	(England) Marion Carpenter	Substituted on
Manager:
(England) George Curl

GK	1	(England) Wendy Hardisty
DF	2	(England) Doreen Jones
DF	3	(England) Jackie Mayes
DF	4	(England) Bernie Barker
DF	5	(England) Loraine Hunt
MF	6	(England) Toni Youd
MF	7	(England) Jill Hanson
MF	8	(England) Sheila Stocks (c)	Substituted off
FW	9	(England) Lorraine Hanson
FW	10	(England) Jackie Sherrard
MF	11	(England) Karen Skillcorn
Substitutes:
FW	12	(England) Karen Walker	Substituted on
MF	13	(England) Carol Carr
Manager:
(England) Mick Sherrard
