= 1983–84 WFA Cup =

Tournament details
- Country: England & Wales

Final positions
- Champions: Howbury Grange
- Runners-up: Doncaster Belles
- Penalty shoot-outs do not count towards the total number of goals.

The 1983–84 WFA Cup was an association football knockout tournament for women's teams, held between 2 October 1983 and 6 May 1984. It was the 14th season of the WFA Cup and was won by Howbury Grange, who defeated Doncaster Belles in the final.

The tournament consisted seven rounds of competition proper.

All match results and dates from the Women's FA Cup Website.

== South West group ==
=== First round proper ===
All games were scheduled for 2 October 1983.

Tie	Home team (tier)	Score	Away team (tier)	Att.
1	Chard	1–0	Cardiff	
2	Tiverton	5–2	Pelynt	
Bye: Bridge Youth Club, Exeter, Exeter Rangers, Exmouth, Frome, Illogan

=== Second round proper ===
All games were originally scheduled for 6 November 1983.

Tie	Home team (tier)	Score	Away team (tier)	Att.
1	Bridge Youth Club	2–12	Chard	
2	Exeter	3–3 (a.e.t.)	Illogan	
replay	Illogan	2–0	Exeter	
3	Exeter Rangers	2–1	Frome	
4	Exmouth	0–10	Tiverton	

=== Third round proper ===
All games were originally scheduled for 4 and 11 December 1983.

Tie	Home team (tier)	Score	Away team (tier)	Att.
1	Illogan	6–0	Exeter Rangers	
2	Tiverton	2–1	Chard	

== Home Counties group ==
=== First round proper ===
All games were scheduled for 2 October 1983.

Tie	Home team (tier)	Score	Away team (tier)	Att.
1	Aylesbury	4–2	Solent	
2	Bournemouth	1–6	Swindon Spitfires	
3	Chelsea	0–8	Southampton	
4	Friends of Fulham	21–0	Compton	
5	Hightown	1–5	Cope Chat	
6	Red Star Southampton	4–3 (a.e.t.)	Newbury	
Bye: Bracknell, C&C Southwick

=== Second round proper ===
All games were originally scheduled for 6 November 1983.

Tie	Home team (tier)	Score	Away team (tier)	Att.
1	C&C Southwick	3–0	Bracknell	
2	Red Star Southampton	0–4	Aylesbury	
3	Southampton	5–3	Friends of Fulham	
4	Swindon Spitfires	4–2	Cope Chat	

=== Third round proper ===
All games were originally scheduled for 4 and 11 December 1983.

Tie	Home team (tier)	Score	Away team (tier)	Att.
1	Aylesbury	2–4	Southampton	
2	C&C Southwick	1–0	Swindon Spitfires	

== Northern Counties group ==
=== First round proper ===
All games were scheduled for 2 October 1983.

Tie	Home team (tier)	Score	Away team (tier)	Att.
1	Bronte	7–0	Darlington Stryk.	
2	Doncaster Belles	2–0	Cleveland Spartans	
3	Kilnhurst	5–0	Sheffield	
4	Middlesbrough	2–2 (a.e.t.)	Rossendale	
replay	Rossendale	5–3	Middlesbrough	
5	Nabwood Athletic	2–2 (a.e.t.)	CP Doncaster	
replay	Doncaster CP	3–0	Nabwood Athletic	
6	Whitley Bay	2–3	Broadoak	
Bye: Rotherham, Rowntree

=== Second round proper ===
All games were originally scheduled for 6 November 1983.

Tie	Home team (tier)	Score	Away team (tier)	Att.
1	Broadoak	0–4	Doncaster Belles	
2	Bronte	4–1	Rossendale	
3	Doncaster CP	2–3	Rotherham	
4	Rowntrees	4–1	Kilnhurst	

=== Third round proper ===
All games were originally scheduled for 4 and 11 December 1983.

Tie	Home team (tier)	Score	Away team (tier)	Att.
1	Bronte	2–3	Doncaster Belles	
2	Rowntrees	3–1	Rotherham	

== South East group ==
=== First round proper ===
All games were scheduled for 2 October 1983.

Tie	Home team (tier)	Score	Away team (tier)	Att.
1	Croydon	1–4	Shoreham	
2	Hassocks Beacon	0–5	Reigate	
3	Herne Bay	1–4	Maidstone	
4	Horsham	0–4	Ashford Town	
5	Howbury Grange	10–1	Gillingham	
6	Southwick	6–1	Northfleet	
7	Worthing	8–1	Eastbourne	
Bye: Edenbridge

=== Second round proper ===
All games were originally scheduled for 6 November 1983.

Tie	Home team (tier)	Score	Away team (tier)	Att.
1	Ashford Town	5–2	Maidstone	
2	Howbury Grange	10–1	Southwick Giants	
3	Worthing	2–3	Shoreham	
Bye: Reigate

=== Third round proper ===
All games were originally scheduled for 4 and 11 December 1983.

Tie	Home team (tier)	Score	Away team (tier)	Att.
1	Reigate	2–3	Ashford Town	
2	Shoreham	0–2	Howbury Grange	

== Chiltern & Essex group ==
=== First round proper ===
All games were scheduled for 2 October 1983.

Tie	Home team (tier)	Score	Away team (tier)	Att.
1	Costessey	3–9	Norwich	
2	Droitwich St. Andrews	0–4	Luton	
3	Hemel Hempstead	3–0	Town & County	
4	Luton Daytel	7–1	Colchester	
5	Pye	20–0	Thorley Lions	
6	Stevenage	25–1	Harlow	
7	Suffolk Bluebirds	3–1	Duston Two Tones	
8	Worcester	0–5	Biggleswade United	

=== Second round proper ===
All games were originally scheduled for 6 November 1983.

Tie	Home team (tier)	Score	Away team (tier)	Att.
1	Hemel Hempstead	7–0	Stevenage	
2	Luton	6–1	Luton Daytel	
3	Norwich	3–2	Biggleswade United	
4	Suffolk Bluebirds	4–3 (a.e.t.)	Pye	

=== Third round proper ===
All games were originally scheduled for 4 and 11 December 1983.

Tie	Home team (tier)	Score	Away team (tier)	Att.
1	Hemel Hempstead	1–0	Norwich	
2	Suffolk Bluebirds	4–2	Luton	

== Greater London group ==
=== First round proper ===
All games were scheduled for 2 October 1983.

Tie	Home team (tier)	Score	Away team (tier)	Att.
1	East Herts College	1–8	Romford	
2	Feltham United	13–0	Hendon	
3	Gallaher	0–3	Watford	
4	Hayes	7–2	Edgware	
5	Milton Keynes	3–1	Molesey	
6	Spurs	4–0	West Ham United	
7	Tottenham	4–3	Chingford	
Bye: Millwall Lionesses

=== Second round proper ===
All games were originally scheduled for 6 November 1983.

Tie	Home team (tier)	Score	Away team (tier)	Att.
1	Hayes	0–8	Tottenham	
2	Milton Keynes	1–6	Millwall Lionesses	
3	Romford	2–3	Feltham United	
4	Watford	1–7	Spurs	

=== Third round proper ===
All games were originally scheduled for 4 and 11 December 1983.

Tie	Home team (tier)	Score	Away team (tier)	Att.
1	Millwall Lionesses	4–0	Tottenham	
2	Spurs	4–2	Feltham United	

== Midland group ==
=== First round proper ===
All games were scheduled for 2 October 1983.

Tie	Home team (tier)	Score	Away team (tier)	Att.
1	Birmingham City	17–0	Leicester	
2	Boots Athletic	2–4	Notts Forest	
3	Haddon Park	3–2	Notts County	
4	Notts Rangers	8–0	Coventry	
5	Solihull	3–0	EMGALS	
6	Uttoxeter Eagles	0–3	Burton Wanderers	
7	Wolverhampton	0–2	Albion Wasps	
Bye: BYC Argyle (Burwell Youth Club)

=== Second round proper ===
All games were originally scheduled for 6 November 1983.

Tie	Home team (tier)	Score	Away team (tier)	Att.
1	Burton Wanderers	0–6	Birmingham City	
2	BYC Argyle (Burwell Youth Club)	10–3	Nottingham Forest	
3	Haddon Park	3–0	Notts Rangers	
4	Solihull	6–0	Albion Wanderers	

=== Third round proper ===
All games were originally scheduled for 4 and 11 December 1983.

Tie	Home team (tier)	Score	Away team (tier)	Att.
1	Birmingham City	8–4	Haddon Park	
2	BYC Argyle (Burwell Youth Club)	2–2 (a.e.t.)	Solihull	
replay	Solihull	1–0	BYC Argyle (Burwell Youth Club)	

== North West group ==
=== First round proper ===
All games were scheduled for 2 October 1983.

Tie	Home team (tier)	Score	Away team (tier)	Att.
1	Chorley	H–W	Rochdale	
Walkover to Chorley
2	Deeside	1–5	Kirkby Sports Centre	
3	Fodens	1–4	Preston Rangers	
4	Ingol Belles	0–5 (a.e.t.)	Preston North End	
5	Macclesfield	4–3	Daresbury	
6	Manchester Corinthians	6–2	Wythenshawe	
7	St Helens	3–2	Crewe	
Bye: Rivacre

=== Second round proper ===
All games were originally scheduled for 6 November 1983.

Tie	Home team (tier)	Score	Away team (tier)	Att.
1	Preston North End	3–6	Kirkby Sports Centre	
2	Preston Rangers	5–1	Chorley	
3	Rivacre	1–4	Macclesfield	
4	St Helens	5–0	Manchester Corinthians	

=== Third round proper ===
All games were originally scheduled for 4 and 11 December 1983.

Tie	Home team (tier)	Score	Away team (tier)	Att.
1	Macclesfield	0–2	St Helens	
2	Preston Rangers	5–0	Kirkby Sports Centre	

== Fourth round proper ==
All games were originally scheduled for 8 January 1984.

Tie	Home team (tier)	Score	Away team (tier)	Att.
1	Ashford Town	0–6	Howbury Grange	
2	C&C Southwick	1–3	Preston Rangers	
3	Millwall Lionesses	1–2	Rowntrees	
4	Solihull	0–2	St Helens	
5	Southampton	11–1	Hemel Hempstead	
6	Spurs	2–5	Birmingham City	
7	Suffolk Bluebirds	0–2	Illogan	
8	Tiverton	1–2	Doncaster Belles	

== Quarter–finals ==
All games were played on 5 February 1984.

Tie	Home team (tier)	Score	Away team (tier)	Att.
1	Doncaster Belles	7–0	Birmingham City	
2	Illogan	0–1	Rowntrees	259
3	Southampton	2–0	Preston Rangers	
4	St Helens	0–4	Howbury Grange	

== Semi–finals ==
All games were played on 11 and 18 March 1984.

Tie	Home team (tier)	Score	Away team (tier)	Att.
1	Doncaster Belles	2–0	Southampton	
2	Rowntrees	1–1 (a.e.t.)	Howbury Grange	
replay	Howbury Grange	3–1	Rowntrees	

== Final ==
6 May 1984
14:30 BST

Howbury Grange	4–2	Doncaster Belles
Baldeo; Springett	Report	L. Hanson

Sincil Bank, Lincoln
Referee: J Ashworth (Rutland)
