= 1987–88 WFA Cup =

Tournament details
- Country: England & Wales

Final positions
- Champions: Doncaster Belles
- Runners-up: Leasowe
- Penalty shoot-outs do not count towards the total number of goals.

The 1987–88 WFA Cup was an association football knockout tournament for women's teams, held between 6 September 1987 and 1 May 1988. It was the 18th season of the WFA Cup and was won by Doncaster Belles, who defeated Leasowe in the final.

The tournament consisted seven rounds of competition proper.

All match results and dates from the Women's FA Cup Website.

== Group A ==
=== First round proper ===
All games were scheduled for 6 and 20 September 1987.

Tie	Home team (tier)	Score	Away team (tier)	Att.
1	Crewe	2–1	Ingol Belles	
2	Fodens	0–15	Birmingham City	
3	Sandwell	1–2	Abbeydale	
Bye: BYC Argyle (Burwell Youth Club), Droitwich St. Andrews, Preston Rangers

=== Second round proper ===
All games were originally scheduled for 4 and 11 October 1987.

Tie	Home team (tier)	Score	Away team (tier)	Att.
1	Abbeydale	6–5 (a.e.t.)	Crewe	
2	Birmingham City	3–0	Preston Rangers	
3	BYC Argyle (Burwell Youth Club)	2–8	Droitwich St. Andrews	

== Group B ==
=== First round proper ===
All games were scheduled for 6 and 20 September 1987.

Tie	Home team (tier)	Score	Away team (tier)	Att.
1	Arsenal	2–3	Milton Keynes	
2	Chelsea	H–W	Northwood	
Northwood withdrew
3	Hemel Hempstead	5–0	Maidstone	
4	Islington	4–0	Vixens	
5	Vicarage Wanderers	3–3	Walton & Hersham	
replay	Walton & Hersham	8–1	Vicarage Wanderers	
Bye: Gallaher

=== Second round proper ===
All games were originally scheduled for 4 and 11 October 1987.

Tie	Home team (tier)	Score	Away team (tier)	Att.
1	Chelsea	7–2	Gallaher	
2	Islington	1–8	Walton & Hersham	
3	Milton Keynes	7–3	Hemel Hempstead	

== Group C ==
=== First round proper ===
All games were scheduled for 6 and 20 September 1987.

Tie	Home team (tier)	Score	Away team (tier)	Att.
1	Beccles	7–0	Diss Town	
2	Launton	1–7	Spondon Leisure Centre	
3	Leighton Linslade	0–7	Watford	
4	Oxford & County	1–4	Biggleswade	
5	Suffolk Bluebirds	3–1	Dunstable	
Bye: Luton Daytel, Norwich

=== Second round proper ===
All games were originally scheduled for 4 and 11 October 1987.

Tie	Home team (tier)	Score	Away team (tier)	Att.
1	Beccles	4–0	Watford	
2	Luton Daytel	2–1	Suffolk Bluebirds	
3	Norwich	A–W	Biggleswade	
Norwich withdrew
Bye: Spondon Leisure Centre

== Group D ==
=== First round proper ===
All games were scheduled for 6 and 20 September 1987.

Tie	Home team (tier)	Score	Away team (tier)	Att.
1	Crewkerne	1–4	Keynsham	
2	Exeter	1–0	Truro City	
3	Exeter Rangers	1–6	Plymouth Pilgrims	
4	Ottery	1–7	Frome	
5	Pelynt	3–1	Taunton Trident	
Bye: Cardiff

=== Second round proper ===
All games were originally scheduled for 4 and 11 October 1987.

Tie	Home team (tier)	Score	Away team (tier)	Att.
1	Cardiff	4–2	Plymouth Pilgrims	
2	Exeter	2–1	Frome	
3	Keynsham	8–0	Pelynt	

== Group E ==
=== First round proper ===
All games were scheduled for 6 and 20 September 1987.

Tie	Home team (tier)	Score	Away team (tier)	Att.
1	Chesterfield	H–W	Leicester	
Leicester withdrew
2	Rainworth Miners Welfare	2–0	Boots Athletic	
3	Sheffield	8–0	G.E.C. / A.E.I.	
Bye: Ilkeston (Bilborough), Kilnhurst, Town & County

=== Second round proper ===
All games were originally scheduled for 4 and 11 October 1987.

Tie	Home team (tier)	Score	Away team (tier)	Att.
1	Chesterfield	0–3	Town & County	
2	Ilkeston (Bilborough)	0–1	Rainworth Miners Welfare	
3	Sheffield	2–1	Kilnhurst	

== Group F ==
=== First round proper ===
All games were scheduled for 6 and 20 September 1987.

Tie	Home team (tier)	Score	Away team (tier)	Att.
1	Newbury	4–0	Cove Krakatoa	
2	Red Star Southampton	9–1	Chingford	
3	Solent	7–0	Swindon Spitfires	
4	Spurs	7–8	Hightown	
5	Tottenham	2–1	District Line	
Bye: Bournemouth

=== Second round proper ===
All games were originally scheduled for 4 and 11 October 1987.

Tie	Home team (tier)	Score	Away team (tier)	Att.
1	Bournemouth	0–3	Solent	
2	Newbury	5–3	Hightown	
3	Red Star Southampton	5–0	Tottenham	

== Group G ==
=== First round proper ===
All games were scheduled for 6 and 20 September 1987.

Tie	Home team (tier)	Score	Away team (tier)	Att.
1	Filey Flyers	4–2	Reckitts	
2	Whitehouse Rovers	3–1	Rowntree	
3	Whitley Bay	5–2	Leeds	
4	Wigan	2–4	Rossendale	
Bye: Broadoak, Bronte

=== Second round proper ===
All games were originally scheduled for 4 and 11 October 1987.

Tie	Home team (tier)	Score	Away team (tier)	Att.
1	Broadoak	3–1	Whitley Bay	
2	Filey Flyers	2–1	Whitehouse Rovers	
3	Rossendale	0–7	Bronte	

== Group H ==
=== First round proper ===
All games were scheduled for 6 and 20 September 1987.

Tie	Home team (tier)	Score	Away team (tier)	Att.
1	Ashford Town	5–0	Southwick	
2	Crawley	0–7	Maidstone Tigresses	
3	Horsham	2–4	Worthing	
4	Medway	A–W	Hassocks Beacon	
Medway withdrew
Bye: Gillingham, Reigate

=== Second round proper ===
All games were originally scheduled for 4 and 11 October 1987.

Tie	Home team (tier)	Score	Away team (tier)	Att.
1	Ashford Town	0–6	Hassocks Beacon	
2	Gillingham	0–8	Reigate	
3	Maidstone Tigresses	4–1	Worthing	

== Third round proper ==
All games were originally scheduled for 1 November 1987.

Tie	Home team (tier)	Score	Away team (tier)	Att.
1	Abbeydale	4–3	Beccles	
2	Bronte	4–0	Spondon Leisure Centre	
3	Doncaster Belles	2–1	Millwall Lionesses	
4	Droitwich St. Andrews	4–1	Rainworth Miners Welfare	
5	Exeter	2–2 (a.e.t.)	Cardiff	
replay	Cardiff	1–2	Exeter	
6	Filey Flyers	1–3	Birmingham City	
7	Friends of Fulham	7–1	Town & County	
8	Keynsham	2–4	C&C Sports	
9	Leasowe	5–3	Biggleswade	
10	Luton Daytel	0–8	Red Star Southampton	
11	Maidstone Tigresses	1–2	Hassocks Beacon	
12	Milton Keynes	0–2	Broadoak	
13	Newbury	1–0	Chelsea	
14	Reigate	3–3 (a.e.t.)	Cleveland Spartans	
replay	Cleveland Spartans	4–3	Reigate	
15	Sheffield	1–2	Solent	
16	Walton & Hersham	4–2	Solihull	

== Fourth round proper ==
All games were originally scheduled for 6 and 13 December 1987.

Tie	Home team (tier)	Score	Away team (tier)	Att.
1	Birmingham City	7–1	Walton & Hersham	
2	C&C Sports	0–1	Red Star Southampton	
3	Doncaster Belles	6–0	Broadoak	
4	Droitwich St. Andrews	0–1	Cleveland Spartans	
5	Exeter	1–6	Abbeydale	
6	Hassocks Beacon	1–7	Friends of Fulham	
7	Leasowe	3–2	Solent	
8	Newbury	2–2 (a.e.t.)	Bronte	
replay	Bronte	?–?	Newbury	

== Quarter–finals ==
All games were played on 7 February 1988.

Tie	Home team (tier)	Score	Away team (tier)	Att.
1	Abbeydale	0–12	Doncaster Belles	
2	Cleveland Spartans	1–2	Birmingham City	
3	Leasowe	6–0	Bronte	
4	Red Star Southampton	1–3	Friends of Fulham	

== Semi–finals ==
All games were played on 13 March 1988.

Tie	Home team (tier)	Score	Away team (tier)	Att.
1	Birmingham City	0–4	Doncaster Belles	
2	Friends of Fulham	2–5	Leasowe	

== Final ==
1 May 1988

Leasowe	1–3	Doncaster Belles
Jackson (pen.)	Report	Walker; Coultard; Sherrard

Gresty Road, Crewe
Attendance: 800
Referee: Philip Wright (Crewe)
