= Lorraine Hanson =

Lorraine Hanson may refer to:

- Lorraine Hanson (footballer) (born 1959), English footballer
- Lorraine Hanson (sprinter) (born 1965), English sprinter
