= 1990–91 WFA Cup =

Tournament details
- Country: England & Wales

Final positions
- Champions: Millwall Lionesses
- Runners-up: Doncaster Belles
- Penalty shoot-outs do not count towards the total number of goals.

The 1990–91 WFA Cup was an association football knockout tournament for women's teams, held between 7 October 1990 and 27 May 1991. It was the 21st season of the WFA Cup and was won by Millwall Lionesses, who defeated Doncaster Belles in the final.

The tournament consisted eight rounds of competition proper.

All match results and dates from the Women's FA Cup Website.

== Group 1 ==
=== First round proper ===
All games were scheduled for 7 October 1990.

Tie	Home team (tier)	Score	Away team (tier)	Att.
1	Bournemouth	6–1	Torquay United	
2	Bristol	23–0	Yetminster	
3	Salisbury	3–1	Exeter Rangers	
4	Swindon Spitfires	2–5	Frome	
Bye: Bridgwater, Cardiff, Clyst Villa, Crewkerne, Hightown, Taunton Trident, Tongwynlais, Truro City

=== Second round proper ===
All games were originally scheduled for 4, 5 and 11 November 1990.

Tie	Home team (tier)	Score	Away team (tier)	Att.
1	Bournemouth	0–2	Cardiff	
2	Bridgwater	0–8	Truro City	
3	Crewkerne	1–11	Tongwynlais	
4	Hightown	0–11	Bristol	
5	Salisbury	2–5	Clyst Villa	
6	Taunton Trident	0–7	Frome	

=== Third round proper ===
All games were originally scheduled for 2 and 9 December 1990.

Tie	Home team (tier)	Score	Away team (tier)	Att.
1	Bristol	8–0	Clyst Villa	
2	Cardiff	4–1	Frome	
3	Tongwynlais	1–5	Truro City	

== Group 2 ==
=== First round proper ===
All games were scheduled for 7 October 1990.

Tie	Home team (tier)	Score	Away team (tier)	Att.
1	Crystal Palace	1–4	Broadbridge Heath	
2	Isle of Wight	0–14	Maidstone United	
3	Solent	0–5	Saltdean United	
Bye: Ashford Town, Brighton & Hove Albion, Hassocks Beacon, Havant, Maidstone Tigresses, Phoenix (Farnborough), Portsmouth, Red Star Southampton, Reigate United

=== Second round proper ===
All games were originally scheduled for 4, 5 and 11 November 1990.

Tie	Home team (tier)	Score	Away team (tier)	Att.
1	Ashford Town	0–18	Red Star Southampton	
2	Broadbridge Heath	0–1	Maidstone Tigresses	
3	Phoenix (Farnborough)	3–1	Havant	
4	Portsmouth	0–9	Hassocks Beacon	
5	Reigate United	3–1	Brighton & Hove Albion	
6	Saltdean United	5–0	Maidstone United	

=== Third round proper ===
All games were originally scheduled for 2 and 9 December 1990.

Tie	Home team (tier)	Score	Away team (tier)	Att.
1	Phoenix (Farnborough)	0–6	Hassocks Beacon	
2	Red Star Southampton	1–0	Maidstone Tigresses	
3	Saltdean United	2–2	Reigate United	
replay	Reigate United	1–2	Saltdean United	

== Group 3 ==
=== First round proper ===
All games were scheduled for 7 October 1990.

Tie	Home team (tier)	Score	Away team (tier)	Att.
1	Launton	1–4	Oxford & County	
2	Newbury	11–0	Reading	
3	Walton & Hersham	1–0	Hillingdon Borough	
4	Watford	18–0	Dukes All Stars	
Bye: Binfield, Carterton, Chelsea, Hounslow, Milton Keynes, Newham, Slough, Vixens

=== Second round proper ===
All games were originally scheduled for 4, 5 and 11 November 1990.

Tie	Home team (tier)	Score	Away team (tier)	Att.
1	Binfield	2–0	Walton & Hersham	
2	Chelsea	19–0	Milton Keynes	
3	Newbury	18–1	Carterton	
4	Slough	6–0	Hounslow	
5	Vixens	0–3	Oxford & County	
6	Watford	9–0	Newham	

=== Third round proper ===
All games were originally scheduled for 2 and 9 December 1990.

Tie	Home team (tier)	Score	Away team (tier)	Att.
1	Binfield	3–4	Newbury	
2	Watford	1–1 (a.e.t.)	Oxford & County	
replay	Oxford & County	1–0	Watford	
3	Slough	1–8	Chelsea	

== Group 4 ==
=== First round proper ===
All games were scheduled for 7 October 1990.

Tie	Home team (tier)	Score	Away team (tier)	Att.
1	Basildon	2–5	Southend	
2	Ipswich Advance	0–16	Millwall Lionesses	
3	Tottenham	6–1	Hornchurch	
Bye: Chelmsford City, Hackney, Harlow, Leyton Orient, Romford, Spurs, Suffolk Bluebirds, Thetford, Wanstead

=== Second round proper ===
All games were originally scheduled for 4, 5 and 11 November 1990.

Tie	Home team (tier)	Score	Away team (tier)	Att.
1	Hackney	1–3	Spurs	
2	Harlow Town	1–4	Romford	
3	Leyton Orient	2–1	Suffolk Bluebirds	
4	Millwall Lionesses	12–0	Tottenham	
5	Southend	2–0	Chelmsford City	
6	Thetford	1–5	Wanstead	

=== Third round proper ===
All games were originally scheduled for 2 and 9 December 1990.

Tie	Home team (tier)	Score	Away team (tier)	Att.
1	Leyton Orient	2–0	Southend	
2	Millwall Lionesses	6–0	Romford	
3	Spurs	6–1	Wanstead	

== Group 5 ==
=== First round proper ===
All games were scheduled for 7 October 1990.

Tie	Home team (tier)	Score	Away team (tier)	Att.
1	Davies Argyle	7–1	Notts County	
2	Luton Daytel	1–2	Bedford Town Bells	
3	Notts Rangers	7–0	Dunstable	
4	TNT Leicester	2–3	Stevenage	
Bye: Derby County, Hemel Hempstead, Hertford Town, Leicester, Leighton Linslade, Phoenix (Peterborough), Pye, Town & County

=== Second round proper ===
All games were originally scheduled for 4, 5 and 11 November 1990.

Tie	Home team (tier)	Score	Away team (tier)	Att.
1	Davies Argyle	12–0	Phoenix (Peterborough)	
2	Derby County	1–1 (a.e.t.)	Leighton Linslade	
replay	Leighton Linslade	?–?	Derby County	
3	Hemel Hempstead	0–2	Stevenage	
4	Leicester	1–0	Bedford Town Bells	
5	Notts Rangers	3–2	Town & County	
6	Pye	H–W	Hertford Town	
Hertford Town disbanded. Walkover for Pye.

=== Third round proper ===
All games were originally scheduled for 2 and 9 December 1990.

Tie	Home team (tier)	Score	Away team (tier)	Att.
1	Leicester	1–7	Davies Argyle	
2	Leighton Linslade	2–2 (a.e.t.)	Pye	
replay	Pye	2–2 (2–4 p)	Leighton Linslade	
3	Notts Rangers	14–1	Stevenage	

== Group 6 ==
=== First round proper ===
All games were scheduled for 7 October 1990.

Tie	Home team (tier)	Score	Away team (tier)	Att.
1	Abbeydale	7–1	Worcester	
2	Bangor City	1–5	Kidderminster	
3	Calverton Miners	2–6	Villa Aztecs	
4	Leek Town	2–4	Crewe	
Bye: Birmingham City, Cheltenham, Chesterfield, Pilkington, Rainworth Miners Welfare, Rugby, West Bromwich Albion, Wolverhampton

=== Second round proper ===
All games were originally scheduled for 4, 5 and 11 November 1990.

Tie	Home team (tier)	Score	Away team (tier)	Att.
1	Chesterfield	H–W	Rugby	
Walkover for Chesterfield
2	Crewe	4–1	Birmingham City	
3	Kidderminster	2–1	Rainworth Miners Welfare	
4	Pilkington	1–6	Villa Aztecs	
5	West Bromwich Albion	0–3	Cheltenham	
6	Wolverhampton	1–5	Abbeydale	

=== Third round proper ===
All games were originally scheduled for 2 and 9 December 1990.

Tie	Home team (tier)	Score	Away team (tier)	Att.
1	Cheltenham	2–3 (a.e.t.)	Chesterfield	
2	Villa Aztecs	1–1 (a.e.t.)	Crewe	
replay	Crewe	0–4	Villa Aztecs	
3	Kidderminster	1–10	Abbeydale	

== Group 7 ==
=== First round proper ===
All games were scheduled for 7 October 1990.

Tie	Home team (tier)	Score	Away team (tier)	Att.
1	Broadoak	4–0	Rochdale	
2	Manchester City	6–0	Blackpool	
3	Nabwood Athletic	2–0	Bolton	
4	Wigan	8–2	Manchester Corinthians	
Bye: Bronte, Bury, Daresbury, Manchester United, Newton, Spondon, Winsford, Wythenshawe

=== Second round proper ===
All games were originally scheduled for 4, 5 and 11 November 1990.

Tie	Home team (tier)	Score	Away team (tier)	Att.
1	Bronte	3–1	Daresbury	
2	Manchester City	6–2	Bury	
3	Manchester United	3–1	Wigan	
4	Nabwood Athletic	2–5	Newton	
5	Winsford	0–15	Spondon	
6	Wythenshawe	3–0	Broadoak	

=== Third round proper ===
All games were originally scheduled for 2 and 9 December 1990.

Tie	Home team (tier)	Score	Away team (tier)	Att.
1	Manchester City	1–1 (a.e.t.)	Wythenshawe	
replay	Wythenshawe	2–3	Manchester City	
2	Manchester United	1–2	Newton	
3	Spondon	0–2	Bronte	

== Group 8 ==
=== First round proper ===
All games were scheduled for 7 October 1990.

Tie	Home team (tier)	Score	Away team (tier)	Att.
1	Hull City	1–5	Huddersfield	
2	Sunderland	1–14	Doncaster Town	
3	Whitehouse Rovers	5–1	Whitley Bay	
Bye: Bradford City, Bransholme, Cleveland Spartans, Millmoor, Newcastle, Oakland Rangers, Red Kestrels, Scarborough, Sheffield Wednesday

=== Second round proper ===
All games were originally scheduled for 4, 5 and 11 November 1990.

Tie	Home team (tier)	Score	Away team (tier)	Att.
1	Cleveland Spartans	3–2	Bradford City	
2	Doncaster Town	H–W	Oakland Rangers	
Walkover for Doncaster Town
3	Millmoor	5–1	Newcastle	
4	Red Kestrels	4–1	Bransholme	
6	Sheffield Wednesday	3–3 (a.e.t.)	Scarborough	
replay	Scarborough	1–1 (3–0 p)	Sheffield Wednesday	
6	Whitehouse Rovers	1–1 (a.e.t.)	Huddersfield	
replay	Huddersfield	2–0	Whitehouse Rovers	

=== Third round proper ===
All games were originally scheduled for 2 and 9 December 1990.

Tie	Home team (tier)	Score	Away team (tier)	Att.
1	Huddersfield	1–4 (a.e.t.)	Cleveland Spartans	
2	Millmoor	0–2	Doncaster Town	
3	Red Kestrels	1–3	Scarborough	

== Fourth round proper ==
All games were originally scheduled for 6 January 1991.

Tie	Home team (tier)	Score	Away team (tier)	Att.
1	Arsenal	2–0	Chelsea	
2	Chesterfield	0–4	Ipswich Town	
3	Cleveland Spartans	4–2	Leyton Orient	
4	District Line	2–17	Doncaster Belles	
5	Friends of Fulham	2–1	Preston Rangers	
6	Leasowe Pacific	4–0	Doncaster Town	
7	Leighton Linslade	0–5	Cardiff	
8	Manchester City	0–3	Hassocks Beacon	
9	Millwall Lionesses	H–W	Spurs	
Walkover for Millwall Lionesses
10	Newbury	2–3	Newton	
11	Notts Rangers	9–2	Villa Aztecs	
12	Oxford & County	1–3	Bronte	
13	Red Star Southampton	6–3	Saltdean United	
14	Scarborough	0–4	Davies Argyle	
15	St Helens	0–6	Bristol	
16	Truro City	1–4	Abbeydale	

== Fifth round proper ==
All games were played on 3 February 1991.

Tie	Home team (tier)	Score	Away team (tier)	Att.
1	Abbeydale	1–2	Davies Argyle	
2	Arsenal	2–0	Cardiff	
3	Doncaster Belles	10–0	Bronte	
4	Friends of Fulham	1–0	Cleveland Spartans	
5	Hassocks Beacon	1–7	Leasowe Pacific	
6	Ipswich Town	3–2	Newton	
7	Millwall Lionesses	2–1	Red Star Southampton	
8	Notts Rangers	4–2	Bristol	

== Quarter–finals ==
All games were played on 3 March 1991.

Tie	Home team (tier)	Score	Away team (tier)	Att.
1	Davies Argyle	2–2 (a.e.t.)	Arsenal	
replay	Arsenal	3–0 (a.e.t.)	Davies Argyle	
2	Doncaster Belles	11–1	Ipswich Town	
3	Leasowe Pacific	2–1	Friends of Fulham	
4	Notts Rangers	1–2	Millwall Lionesses	

== Semi–finals ==
All games were played on 7 April 1991.

Tie	Home team (tier)	Score	Away team (tier)	Att.
1	Arsenal	1–2	Millwall Lionesses	
2	Doncaster Belles	8–1	Leasowe Pacific	

== Final ==
27 May 1991
14:00 BST

Millwall Lionesses	1–0	Doncaster Belles
Baldeo 65'	Report

Prenton Park, Birkenhead
Attendance: 4,010
Referee: Bob Nixon (Wirral)
