= 1984 WFA Cup final =

1984 WFA Cup Final
- Event: 1983–84 WFA Cup
| Howbury Grange | Doncaster Belles |
| 4 | 2 |
- Date: 6 May 1984
- Venue: Sincil Bank, Lincoln, England
- Referee: J Ashworth (Rutland)

The 1984 WFA Cup Final was the 14th final of the WFA Cup, England's primary cup competition for women's football teams. The showpiece event was played under the auspices of the Women's Football Association (WFA). Howbury Grange and Doncaster Belles contested the match at Sincil Bank, the home stadium of Lincoln City on 6 May 1984. Howbury Grange won 4–2.

== Match details ==
6 May 1984
14:30 BST

| Howbury Grange | 4–2 | Doncaster Belles |
|---|---|---|
| Baldeo; Springett | Report | L. Hanson |

Sincil Bank, Lincoln
Referee: J Ashworth (Rutland)

| GK | 1 | (England) Theresa Wiseman |
| DF | 2 | (England) Shirley Stewart |
| DF | 3 | (England) Jackie Harper |
| DF | 4 | (England) Lorraine Everard |
| DF | 5 | (England) Sallie Jackson |
| MF | 6 | (England) Hannah Davidson |
| MF | 7 | (England) Debbie Fox |
| MF | 8 | (England) Debbie Bampton (c) |
| MF | 9 | (England) Tracy Doe |
| FW | 10 | (England) Terri Springett |
| FW | 11 | (England) Yvonne Baldeo |
Substitutes:
| FW | 12 | (England) Madeline Makarab |
| GK | 13 | (England) Dana McDonald |
| DF | 14 | (England) Wendy Brown |
Manager:
(England) Albert Bampton

| GK | 1 | (England) Val Blake |
| DF | 2 | (England) Doreen Jones |
| DF | 3 | (England) Wendy Hardisty |
| DF | 4 | (England) Jackie Sherrard |
| DF | 5 | (England) Loraine Hunt |
| MF | 6 | (England) Toni Youd |
| MF | 7 | (England) Jill Hanson |
| MF | 8 | (England) Sheila Stocks (c) |
| MF | 9 | (England) Lorraine Hanson |
| FW | 10 | (England) Carol Carr |
| FW | 11 | (England) Karen Skillcorn |
Substitutes:
| FW | 12 | (England) Ruth Derrick |
| DF | 13 | (England) Julie Sutcliffe |
| MF | 14 | (England) Andrea Lawson |
Manager:
(England) Richard Hanson
