= Lorraine Hanson (footballer) =

English footballer

Personal information
- Birth name: Lorraine Dobb
- Place of birth: Worksop, England
- Positions: Defender; forward

Senior career*
Years	Team	Apps	(Gls)
- Carr Fastener
- Nottingham Rangers
1977–1989	Doncaster Belles		

International career
1974–1985	England	37	(2)
- * Club domestic league appearances and goals

Lorraine Hanson (née Dobb) is a former Doncaster Belles and England women's international footballer. She competed at the 1984 European Competition for Women's Football where she missed a penalty during the shoot-outs in the second leg of the final against Sweden. She won the Women's FA Cup three times during the 1980's.

== Doncaster Belles ==
Hanson won her first WFA Cup in 1983 with a 3-2 win over St Helens at Sincil Bank. She scored twice in the 1984 final, but her team were beaten by Howbury Grange 4-2. Doncaster lost to Friends of Fulham and Norwich in 1985 and 1986 respectively. She won her second WFA Cup with another win over St Helens at the City Ground in 1987, and was captain in the 1988 final when they beat Leasowe Pacific 3-1 at Gresty Road to win her third. She later played in the East Midlands League for Rainworth Miner's Welfare.

== International career ==
Hanson was first called up by England in 1974 for a match against France. In the 1984 Euros final, Swedish goalkeeper Elisabeth Leidinge saved her penalty in a shootout at Kenilworth Road after the two-legged final finished 1-1. She was allotted cap number 23 when the FA announced their legacy numbers scheme to honour the 50th anniversary of England’s inaugural international.

== Personal life ==
In 1982 she married Richard Hanson who was the manager of Doncaster Belles in the 1983 and 84 WFA Cup finals. Her sister-in-law Jill Hanson was her teammate during the 1983 and 1987 cup wins.
