= Yvonne Baldeo =

English footballer

Personal information
- Position: Midfielder

Senior career*
Years	Team	Apps	(Gls)
- Howbury Grange
- A.C.F. Milan
- Millwall Lionesses L.F.C.
- * Club domestic league appearances and goals

Yvonne Baldeo is an English former professional footballer. She played for A.C.F. Milan and Millwall Lionesses L.F.C. In 1984 Baldeo scored two goals in Women's FA Cup final in a 4–2 victory for Howbury Grange. Baldeo also scored the winning goal in the 1991 Women's FA cup final.

== Honours ==
Howbury Grange

- FA Women's Cup: 1984

Millwall Lionesses

- FA Women's Cup: 1991
