= Michelle Jackson (footballer) =

English footballer

Personal information
- Full name: Michelle Slater
- Birth name: Michelle Jackson
- Date of birth: 5 June 1968 (age 58)
- Place of birth: Birkenhead, England
- Height: 5 ft 9 in (1.75 m)
- Position: Defender

Youth career
- Dolphin Youth Club

Senior career*
| Years | Team | Apps | (Gls) |
| 1983–1988 | Leasowe | 102 | |
| 1988–2002 | Doncaster Rovers Belles | 278 | |

International career
| 1991–1995 | England | 2 | (0) |
- * Club domestic league appearances and goals

Michelle Slater (née Jackson) (born 5 June 1968) is a former England women's international footballer.

Jackson began her career playing 5-a-side youth club football at Dolphin Youth Club. She then went on to play for Leasowe Ladies (now known as Everton Ladies). After losing to Doncaster Belles 3–1 in the 1988 WFA Cup Final Jackson left Leasowe to join the Belles. While at Doncaster, Jackson was in the FA cup-winning team on three occasions; 1989–90, 1991–92 and 1993–94.

== International career ==
In 1991 Jackson made her debut for England on 25 May against USA in Hirson, France. In November 2022, Jackson was recognized by The Football Association as one of the England national team's legacy players, and as the 91st women's player to be capped by England.

== Family ==
Jackson's father Billy Jackson was manager of Leasowe Pacific in both the 1988 and 1989 WFA Cup finals.

== Honours ==
Doncaster Belles

- FA Women's Cup: 1990, 1992, 1994
- Runners up 1991, 1993, 2000
- Doubles : Premier League National Division and FA Women's Cup: 1991–92, 1993–94
- WFA National League Premier Division (National Tier 1): 1991–92, 1993–94
- North East Regional League: 1989–90, 1990–91
- Nottinghamshire League: 1988–89

Leasowe

- Runners up FA Women's Cup: 1988
- North West Regional League: 1986–87 1987–88

== Bibliography ==
- Davies, Pete (1996). I Lost My Heart To The Belles. Mandarin. ISBN 0-7493-2085-0.
