= Sue Law =

English footballer

Personal information
- Date of birth: 25 April 1966 (age 60)
- Place of birth: Rochford
- Position: Defender

International career
| Years | Team | Apps | (Gls) |
| 1985–1992 | England | 39 | (1) |

Sue Law (born 25 April 1966) is a retired English footballer and current head of equality and child protection at the Football Association (FA). She played as a defender and represented England at senior international level. Law won 39 caps for England as a right back or central defender.

== Career ==
Her debut for England came as a 19–year–old in a win over Wales in the Isle of Man on 17 August 1985. She took over the right back position later that year from Carol Thomas, then England's most capped player and second longest serving captain. England won the match 6–0. In 1988, she was part of the England team that won the 1988 Mundialito, where England defeated Italy in the final. In November 1992, Law played her final match for England at Millmoor, Rotherham in the EURO 1993 quarter final second–leg meeting with Italy. In what was the final match to be played under Women's Football Association (WFA) control, England lost 3–0 (6–2 on aggregate) amidst farcical scenes. Louise Waller was sent off for deliberate handball, while Law, hampered by a back injury, scored an own goal.

She was part of Millwall Lionesses' 1991 WFA Cup winning team when they beat Doncaster Belles 1‍–‍0 at Prenton Park. She later played for Bromley Borough. She retired after a 1992–93 WFA Cup semi-final defeat against Arsenal.

In 2022, she was allotted number 68 when the FA announced their legacy numbers scheme to honour the 50th anniversary of England's inaugural international.

== Bibliography ==
- Lopez, Sue (1997). Women on the Ball: A Guide to Women's Football. London, England: Scarlet Press. ISBN 1857270169.
