= Loraine Hunt =

English footballer

Personal information
- Position: Defender

Senior career*
Years	Team	Apps	(Gls)
- Doncaster Belles

International career
1982‍–‍1988	England	16	(0)
- * Club domestic league appearances and goals

Loraine Hunt is an English former international footballer who played as a defender for the Doncaster Belles. She represented the England women's national football team at senior international level and won sixteen caps. Hunt was part of the team at the 1987 European Competition for Women's Football. During her club career she won the Women's FA Cup four times with Doncaster Belles.

== Doncaster Belles ==
Hunt played in nine WFA Cup finals with Doncaster Belles but her first three finals all ended in defeat, in 1984, 1985 and 1986. She won her first WFA Cup winners medal in 1987 when Doncaster Belles beat St Helens at the City Ground, home of Nottingham Forest and she won her second winners medal the following year in 1988 when Doncaster Belles beat Leasowe Pacific at Gresty Road, Crewe. She won her third WFA Cup in 1990 with victory over Friends of Fulham at the Baseball Ground in Derby. Doncaster Belles were runners-up to Millwall Lionesses in 1991 but Hunt was able to win her fourth WFA Cup in 1992 when her team defeated Red Star Southampton 4-0 in the final at Prenton Park. Her last final was in 1993 when Doncaster Belles lost 3-0 at the Manor Gound, Oxford to Arsenal.

== International career ==
In November 2022, Hunt was recognized by The Football Association as one of the England national team's legacy players, and as the 57th women's player to be capped by England.

== Honours ==
- Doncaster Belles: FA Women's Cup: 1987, 1988, 1990, 1992

== See also ==
- List of England women's international footballers (alphabetical)
- 1987 European Competition for Women's Football squads
