= Piera-Cassandra Maglio =

Italian footballer

Personal information
- Date of birth: 30 January 1976 (age 50)
- Position: Midfielder

Senior career*
Years	Team	Apps	(Gls)
- Bardolino Verona

International career
- Italy
- * Club domestic league appearances and goals

Piera-Cassandra Maglio (born 30 January 1976) is an Italian footballer who played as a midfielder for the Italy women's national football team. She was part of the team at the UEFA Women's Euro 2001. On club level she played for Bardolino Verona in Italy.
