= Lori Hoey =

English footballer

Personal information
- Full name: Lorraine Hoey
- Place of birth: Clapham, England
- Position: Right back

Senior career*
Years	Team	Apps	(Gls)
1979-1991	Friends of Fulham		

International career
1986-1987	England	3	(0)
- * Club domestic league appearances and goals

Lori Hoey is a former England women's international footballer. She represented England at the 1987 European Competition for Women's Football and spent most of her club career at Friends of Fulham.

== Club career ==
Hoey won the Women's FA Cup in 1985 when Friends of Fulham beat Doncaster Belles 2-0 at Craven Cottage.

== International career ==
In November 2022, Hoey was recognized by The Football Association as one of the England national team's legacy players, and as the 70th women's player to be capped by England. She won three caps during her career.

== Honours ==
Friends of Fulham

- FA Women's Cup: 1984–85
