= Terri Springett =

English footballer

Senior career*
| Years | Team | Apps | (Gls) |
- Howbury Grange
- Friends of Fulham

International career
| 1980 | England | 2 | (0) |
- * Club domestic league appearances and goals

Terri Springett is a former England women's international footballer. She represented the England women's national football team at senior international level. She won the 1984 Women's FA Cup with Howbury Grange after they defeated Doncaster Belles in the final at Sincil Bank. Springett scored twice in a 4-2 win. After moving to Friends of Fulham, she lost in both the 1989 and 1990 finals.

== International career ==
In November 2022, Springett was recognized by The Football Association as one of the England national team's legacy players, and as the 52nd women's player to be capped by England.

== Personal life ==
Terri Springett is the daughter of 1966 World Cup winner Ron Springett. Since retiring from professional football she is the club secretary for Queens Park Rangers.

== Honours ==
Howbury Grange

- FA Women's Cup: 1984
