= Jackie Sherrard =

English footballer

Personal information
- Full name: Jacqueline Sherrard
- Date of birth: 9 June 1966 (age 60)
- Position: Midfielder

Senior career*
| Years | Team | Apps | (Gls) |
- Doncaster Belles

International career
| 1983‍–‍1992 | England | 47 | (5) |
- * Club domestic league appearances and goals

Jackie Sherrard (born 9 June 1966) is a former English international football midfielder who won forty seven caps for England. She spent most of her career at Doncaster Belles where she won the Women's FA Cup five times.

== Club career ==
Sherrard's first triumph in the WFA Cup came in 1983 when Doncaster Belles beat St Helens 3‍–‍2 at Sincil Bank. Three successive defeats in finals followed, before success in 1987 with a 2‍–‍0 win over St Helens at the City Ground, a match in which Sherrard scored. She scored again at Gresty Road in 1988 against Leasowe Pacific for back to back victories in the competition. Derby County's Baseball Ground was the scene for her fourth WFA Cup victory in 1990 with a 1‍–‍0 win over Friends of Fulham. Millwall Lionesses beat Doncaster in 1991 but Sherrard celebrated a fifth and final victory in 1992 at Prenton Park after a 4‍–‍0 win against Red Star Southampton.

== International career ==
Sherrard made her debut on 30 October 1983 in a 2‍–‍2 draw with Sweden at The Valley. She played for England at Euro 87 which was held in Norway and she also played in the Mundialito final in 1988. In November 2022, Sherrard was recognized by The Football Association as one of the England national team's legacy players, and as the 63rd women's player to be capped by England.

== Honors ==
Doncaster

- FA Women's Cup: 1982–83, 1986–87, 1987–88, 1989-90, 1991–92
