= Wirral District Football Association =

County
- Founded: 1885
- Folded: 2024
- County affiliation: Cheshire
- Website: www.wirraldistrictfa.com

The Wirral District Football Association (WDFA) was the organisation responsible for Association football in and around the Wirral Peninsula. It was affiliated to the Cheshire County Association, which in turn is affiliated to the Football Association. Following a review of County Football Association governance and procedures, the association disbanded at the end of 2023-24 football season.

== Competitions ==
Wirral District Kit

=== Leagues ===
- Birkenhead & Wirral League (defunct)
- Birkenhead Sunday League
- Eastham & District Junior League
- Ellesmere Port Junior Sunday League
- Ellesmere Port Senior Sunday League
- Wallasey Junior Football League
- Wallasey Sunday League
- West Cheshire League
- Wirral Sunday League (defunct)

=== Cups ===
- Senior Cup
- Amateur Cup
- Junior Cup
- Premier Cup
- Sunday Amateur
- Sunday Junior Cup
- Under 18s Youth Cup
- Under 16s Youth Cup
- Under 14s Minor Cup
- Under 12s Minor 'B' Cup
