= Gail Borman =

English footballer

Personal information
- Date of birth: 25 April 1963 (age 63)
- Place of birth: England
- Position: Striker

Senior career*
Years	Team	Apps	(Gls)
- Reckitts W.F.C.
1984–1987	Rowntree W.F.C.		
1987–2003	Doncaster Belles		

International career
1990-1995	England	22	(7)
- * Club domestic league appearances and goals

Gail Borman (born 25 April 1963) is an English former footballer, who played club football for the Doncaster Belles. She was described by journalist Pete Davies, author of the book I lost my Heart to the Belles, as a "quick and elegant England striker."

== Club career ==
In 1991–92 Borman hit 17 goals as part of a deadly forward partnership with Karen Walker, as Doncaster Belles carried off the inaugural National Division. The following season Borman was unable to find a way past Arsenal's goalkeeper as The Belles lost the WFA Cup final 3–0 to their southern rivals. In 1994 The Belles and Borman won the Cup back by beating Knowsley United in the final at Glanford Park.

Borman remained loyal to the club throughout the following years and was named as a substitute in the Belles' FA Women's Cup final defeats in 2000 and 2002. When manager Julie Chipchase left for Leeds United in June 2003, Borman assumed the position of acting manager. She then became assistant to new boss John Buckley.

== International career ==
Borman represented England at senior level. She scored both goals in a 2–0 win over Scotland at McDiarmid Park in August 1992.

Borman missed the 1995 FIFA Women's World Cup with a knee injury. She returned to the international fold in November 1995; replacing Karen Farley for the last nine minutes of a 5–0 win over Croatia at the Valley.

She was allotted 80 when the FA announced their legacy numbers scheme to honour the 50th anniversary of England’s inaugural international.
