= Howbury Grange =

English women's football team

Howbury Grange was a women's football team which won the Women's FA Cup in 1984.

== History ==
The team was founded in 1981, in Bexley, by Jane Hardman-Brown, a sports teacher, and named for a school at which she had taught. In 1983, they won the Home Counties League Division 2. The following season, they were captained by Debbie Bampton, whose father, Albert Bampton, became the manager. They reached the final of the 1984 Women's FA Cup, but their opponents, the Doncaster Belles, were considered the strong favourites. Yvonne Baldeo and Terri Springett scored two goals each, bringing about a 4-2 victory. Bampton would go on to win a career total of five WFA Cups with different clubs and defender Sallie Jackson later won with four different teams.

The 1984/85 season was far less successful, with the team having to withdraw from the Women's FA Cup due to a shortage of players. In 1990, they reached the cup quarter final.
