= Gillian Coultard =

English footballer (born 1963)

Gillian Coultard MBE
Personal information
- Date of birth: 22 July 1963 (age 63)
- Place of birth: Thorne, England
- Height: 5 ft 0 in (1.52 m)
- Positions: Sweeper; midfielder

Senior career*
Years	Team	Apps	(Gls)
1976–1982	Doncaster Rovers Belles		
1982–1986	Rowntree W.F.C.		
1986–2001	Doncaster Rovers Belles		

International career^{‡}
1981–2000	England	125	(19)
- * Club domestic league appearances and goals as of 13 October 2010 ‡ National team caps and goals as of 13 October 2010

Gillian Coultard MBE (born 22 July 1963) is an English former football player, and former England captain. She is one of England Women's most capped internationals, with 125 appearances, and was the highest capped outfield England international for a number of years. At one stage she was one of only five footballers (Bobby Moore, Billy Wright, Bobby Charlton and Peter Shilton were the others) to have reached over 100 caps for England, and she was the first woman and amateur player to have done so.

== Club career ==
At club level, Coultard won two National League titles and six FA Women's Cup finals during 24 years with Doncaster Belles. Joining as a 13-year-old schoolgirl, she eventually made over 300 appearances and became a key player in the side. She retired from club football at the end of the 2000–01 season, making an emotional farewell appearance for the Belles against Charlton Athletic in May 2001.

Coultard fitted in four training sessions and a match every week, despite her full–time job on the production line at a Pioneer factory in Castleford. She used her annual leave from work to play for England and rejected several offers to join semi-professional clubs in Belgium, Italy, Sweden and Finland.

== International career ==
Coultard, a midfielder initially, though moving back to sweeper towards the end of her career, made her international debut in a 3–1 win over the Republic of Ireland in 1981, at the age of 18. She went on to score 19 goals at international level including a pair in England's first ever World Cup finals match, a 3–2 win over Canada in Sweden, in 1995. England were knocked out at the quarter-final stage by eventual tournament runners-up, Germany. Coultard had also been part of the England squad which finished runners-up to Sweden in the first UEFA final in 1984, losing the final on penalties. Coultard was appointed England captain in 1991 when the previous captain Debbie Bampton was injured. Bampton was restored as captain in 1995, but Coultard regained the captaincy in 1997 when Bampton retired from international football.

Coultard won her 100th England cap in a 4–0 win over Scotland at Almondvale Stadium in August 1997. That October, before a 1999 World Cup qualifier against Holland at Upton Park, she was presented with a silver cap by Geoff Hurst in recognition of the achievement.

In the early stages of England's successful 2001 UEFA Women's Championship qualification campaign Coultard remained captain of the side. Coultard's 125th and final cap came in a 1–0 win over Switzerland in May 2000. She was later a non-playing member of the England side which suffered their record defeat – an 8–0 loss away to Norway in June 2000. In October 2000, 37-year-old Coultard announced her international retirement in order to concentrate on a coaching role in the National Women's Football Academy in Durham.

She was allotted 56 when the FA announced their legacy numbers scheme to honour the 50th anniversary of England’s inaugural international.

"Gillian was a genuinely world class player."

— England women manager Hope Powell on Coultard

== Post-retirement ==
In May 2005 Coultard was diagnosed with breast cancer, which was successfully treated with surgery, chemotherapy and radium therapy. On 19 October 2006, she was inducted into the English Football Hall of Fame. Coultard managed the new Hartlepool United Ladies team in 2008–09. In 2009, she was offered a role as coach of the Estonia women's national football team, but turned down the offer for personal reasons. After her footballing career, she has served as a warehouse operative at Teva Pharmaceuticals.

Coultard was appointed Member of the Order of the British Empire (MBE) in the 2021 New Year Honours for services to football.

== Honours ==
Doncaster Rovers Belles

- FA Women's Premier League National Division: 1991–92, 1993–94 (Note: Up until 1991, there was no top national division of English women's football; from then, until the formation of the FA WSL in 2010, it was the FA Women's Premier League National Division. The FA only took over the direct running of the domestic league structure from the WFA in 1993.)
- FA Women's Cup: 1982–83, 1986–87, 1987–88, 1989–90, 1991–92, 1993–94
- Mundialito: 1988
