= Karen Walker (footballer) =

English footballer

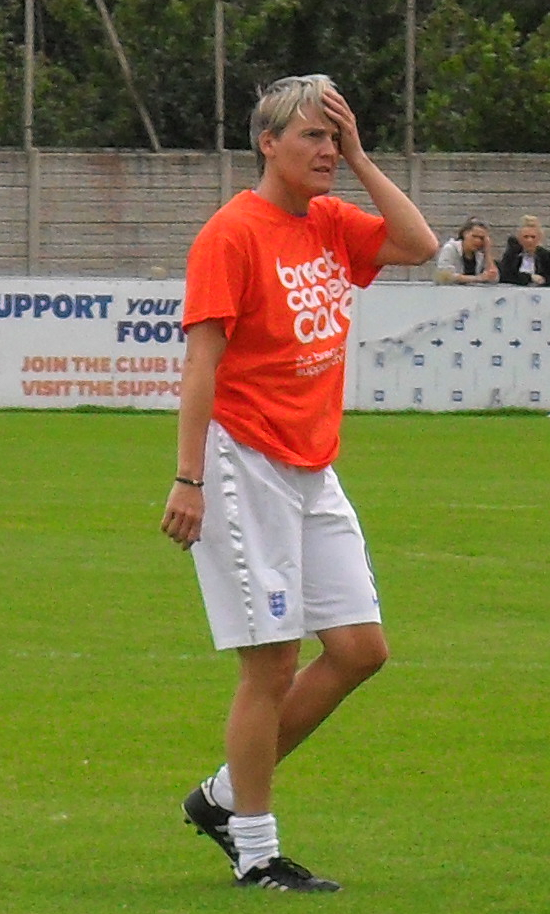
- Walker in 2015

Personal information
- Date of birth: 29 July 1969 (age 57)
- Place of birth: Mexborough, England
- Height: 5 ft 8 in (1.73 m)
- Position: Forward

Senior career*
Years	Team	Apps	(Gls)
1985–2004	Doncaster Belles	130+	(321+)
2004–2006	Leeds United	10	(16)
Total		140	(337)

International career
1988–2003	England	86	(41)
- * Club domestic league appearances and goals

Karen Walker (born 29 July 1969) is an English former footballer who played as a centre-forward. She played for Doncaster Belles for 20 years, starting at the age of 15, and began playing for England as a teenager, making 83 appearances and scoring a record 40 goals until she retired from international football in 2003. Walker's uncompromising style of play earned her the sobriquet "Wacker".

Walker is particularly remembered for her performances in the 1995 FIFA Women's World Cup in Sweden. She finished her career with two seasons at Leeds United, and in her last game, against Arsenal in the 2006 FA Women's Cup final, she left the pitch to a standing ovation.

In 2007, she was part of the BBC team covering the 2007 FIFA Women's World Cup in China. Later that year, she was inducted into the English Football Hall of Fame.

== Club career ==
Walker's neighbour, Karen Skillcorn, was already playing for Doncaster Belles and recruited Walker as a fifteen-year-old. After a period as a substitute, Walker became first choice when the club's regular centre-forward became pregnant. In a long career with the club, she eventually played in 11 FA Women's Cup finals, winning five of them. With the formation of the National Division in 1991, Walker scored 36 goals in 14 games to help Doncaster win the inaugural title. Red Star Southampton were vanquished 4–0 in the 1992 WFA Cup final as the club won a League and Cup double. Walker reportedly set a record by scoring a hat-trick in every round of the Cup, including the final.

== Career statistics ==
=== Club ===
Season Statistics - Update: 14 May 2026
Club	Season	League		FA Cup		Other		Total	
Club	Season	Apps	Goals	Apps	Goals	Apps	Goals	Apps	Goals
Doncaster Belles	1984-85	1	3	0	0	0	0	1+	3+
Doncaster Belles	1985-86	0	0	1	2	0	0	1+	2+
Doncaster Belles	1986-87	2	7	3	6	0	0	5+	13+
Doncaster Belles	1987-88	2	10	1	1	2	4	5+	15+
Doncaster Belles	1988-89	1	4	0	0	0	0	1+	4+
Doncaster Belles	1989-90	0	0	0	0	0	0	0	0
Doncaster Belles	1990-91	1+	67	1	3	1	2	3+	72+
Doncaster Belles	1991-92	14	36	5	20	0	0	19	56
Doncaster Belles	1992-93	11	20	3	4	2	7	16+	31+
Doncaster Belles	1993-94	12	35	5	10	2	6	19+	51+
Doncaster Belles	1994-95	9	21	2	4	2	3	13+	28+
Doncaster Belles	1995-96	12	19	3	4	4	12	19+	35+
Doncaster Belles	1996-97	10	13	1	4	2	2	13+	19+
Doncaster Belles	1997-98	9	18	1	4	0	0	10+	22+
Doncaster Belles	1998-99	6	6	2	7	3	11	11+	24+
Doncaster Belles	1999-00	11	22	3	3	5	9	19+	34+
Doncaster Belles	2000-01	6	7	1	1	2	5	9+	13+
Doncaster Belles	2001-02	7	11	0	0	1	1	8+	12+
Doncaster Belles	2002-03	8	10	0	0	1	1	9+	11+
Doncaster Belles	2003-04	8	12	0	0	0	0	8+	12+
Total		130+	321+	32+	73+	27+	63+	189+	457+
Leeds	2004-05	10	16	0	0	0	0	10+	16+
Leeds	2005-06	0	0	3	4	0	0	3+	4+
Total		10+	16+	3+	4+	0	0	13	17+
Total		140+	337+	35+	77+	27+	63+	202+	477+

== International career ==
In July 1988, Walker made her England debut as a teenager against an Italy B team in the Mundialito tournament. Scoring with her first kick of the ball inspired Walker to take her subsequent football career much more seriously.

In November 2022, Walker was recognized by The Football Association as one of the England national team's legacy players, and as the 72nd women's player to be capped by England.

=== International goals ===
Since The Football Association took over the team in 1993. Scores and results list England's goal tally first.

Goal	Date	Venue	Opponent	Result	Competition	Scored
3	25 September 1993	Bežigrad Stadium, Ljubljana	Slovenia	10–0	1995 UEFA Championship Qual.	3
5	6 November 1993	KVV Coxyde, Koksijde	Belgium	3–0	1995 UEFA Championship Qual.	2
7	13 March 1994	City Ground, Nottingham	Belgium	6–0	1995 UEFA Championship Qual.	2
9	17 April 1994	Griffin Park, Brentford	Slovenia	10–0	1995 UEFA Championship Qual.	2
10	8 June 1995	Tingvalla IP, Karlstad	Nigeria	3–2	1995 World Cup	1
12	19 November 1995	The Valley, London	Croatia	5–0	1997 UEFA Championship Qual.	2
13	23 May 1998	Sportpark Olympia, Waalwijk	Netherlands	1–2	1999 World Cup Qual.	1
15	13 September 1998	Stadionul Poiana, Câmpina	Romania	4–1	1999 World Cup Qual.	2
16	11 October 1998	Adams Park, Wycombe	Romania	2–1	1999 World Cup Qual.	1
17	26 May 1999	Lugo, Emilia-Romagna	Italy	1–4	Friendly	1
18	22 August 1999	Odense Stadion, Odense	Denmark	1–0	Friendly	1
19	17 October 1999	Sportanlagen Trinermatten, Zofingen	Switzerland	3–0	2001 UEFA Championship Qual.	1
20	20 February 2000	Oakwell, Barnsley	Portugal	2–0	2001 UEFA Championship Qual.	1
21	30 October 2000	Kolos Stadium, Boryspil	Ukraine	2–1	2001 UEFA Championship Qual.	1
22	24 November 2001	Complexo Desportivo da Gafanha, Gafanha da Nazaré	Portugal	1–1	2003 World Cup Qual.	1
24	5 March 2002	Estádio Municipal, Lagos	Sweden	3–6	Algarve Cup	2
25	7 March 2002	Estádio Municipal, Quarteira	Scotland	4–1	Algarve Cup	1
25	23 March 2002	Zuiderpark Stadion, The Hague	Netherlands	4–0	2003 World Cup Qual.	1
27	16 September 2002	Laugardalsvöllur, Reykjavík	Iceland	2–2	2003 World Cup Qual.	2

== See also ==
- List of women footballers with 500 or more goals
