= Doncaster Rovers Belles L.F.C. =

Women's association football club in Doncaster, South Yorkshire, England

Doncaster Rovers Belles
- Full name: Doncaster Rovers Belles; Ladies Football Club
- Nicknames: The Belles; Donny Belles
- Founded: 1969; 57 years ago (as Belle Vue Belles)
- Ground: SL2 Rail Stadium
- Capacity: 15,231
- President: Sheila Edmunds
- Chief executive: Chris Wood
- Manager: Dylan Wimbury
- League: FA Women's National League Division One North
- 2025–26: FA Women's National League Division One North, 11th of 12 (relegated)
- Website: doncasterroversfc.co.uk/belles
Home colours

Doncaster Rovers Belles Ladies Football Club, previously Doncaster Belles, is an English women's football club that currently plays in the East Midlands Regional Women's Football League Premier Division, the fifth tier of women's football in England following relegation from the FA Women's National League Division One North at the end of 2025–26. The club's administration is based at their home ground of Eco-Power Stadium (formerly Keepmoat Stadium) in Doncaster, South Yorkshire.

They are one of English women's football's most famous and successful clubs, being one of only three non-London teams to have won the FA Women's Premier League National Division, in 1992 and 1994. Founded in 1969 by lottery ticket sellers at Belle Vue, home of Doncaster Rovers Football Club, they have also won the Women's FA Cup six times and reached the final on a further seven occasions.

== History ==
=== Early years ===
The club was founded as the Belle Vue Belles in 1969, by Sheila Stocks and other women who sold 'Golden Goals' lottery tickets during Doncaster Rovers home games at Belle Vue. After finding success in informal local competition, the club became Doncaster Belles in 1971 and joined the Sheffield League in 1972. With the demise of the Sheffield League after three seasons, the Belles joined the Nottinghamshire League setup and dominated for over a decade. Following a reorganisation in 1989, the club won the new North East League in both seasons of its existence, before being invited to join the inaugural eight-team National Division in 1991.

Sheila Stocks played for the club for 25 years, retiring aged 41 after the victorious 1994 FA Women's Cup Final. She later served as physiotherapist and club welfare officer. A teacher by profession, she married future Belles manager Paul Edmunds who worked at the same school. In 2008 she was awarded the FA Special Achievement Award, and received the Doctor of Business of Administration from BPP University following her services to women in sport. She currently serves as the club's president and General Manager.

=== National dominance ===
The official programme from a home game against Red Star Southampton on 11 April 1993

The club reached the Women's FA Cup final for the first time in 1983, defeating St Helens 3–2 at Sincil Bank in Lincoln. The Belles then lost the next three successive finals; to Howbury Grange (2–4), Friends of Fulham (0–2) and Norwich (3–4). In May 1987 the club recaptured the trophy, beating St Helens 2–0 at the City Ground in Nottingham. Doncaster Belles retained the Cup in 1987–88 by defeating Merseyside team Leasowe Pacific 3–1. In 1990 the Belles were back in the final, Gillian Coultard scoring the only goal as Friends of Fulham were beaten at the Baseball Ground in Derby. 1991's final saw the club lose out 1–0 to Millwall Lionesses at Prenton Park.

That summer the Women's Football Association invited the club to affiliate to a new, eight-team National Premier Division. England strikers Karen Walker and Gail Borman scored a combined total of more than 50 goals as the Belles won the inaugural 1991–92 championship with a 100% record. Red Star Southampton were vanquished 4–0 in the 1992 WFA Cup final as the club won a League and Cup double. Walker set a record in scoring a hat-trick in every round of the Cup, including the final.

The following season's League was expanded to 10 teams, and in March 1993 newly promoted Arsenal inflicted only the Belles' second league defeat in 15 years, 2–1, before a crowd of 18,196 at Highbury. The dropped points, coupled with a shock defeat by Wimbledon, meant that Arsenal captured the 1992–93 WFA National League Premier Division title. The following month Arsenal confirmed their dominance by beating Doncaster Belles 3–0 in the 1993 WFA Cup final.

In 1993–94, another costly defeat by Arsenal left the Belles needing three wins from their last four games to win the League. This was achieved and the club regained the Premier Division title by four points from second-placed Arsenal. The Belles also relieved Arsenal of the Cup after reaching their 11th Cup final in 12 years—the first to be played under the direct control of The Football Association. Karen Walker's header from a Joanne Broadhurst corner defeated Knowsley United 1–0 at Glanford Park in Scunthorpe. The club was denied the chance of an historic treble, when the season overran and the Premier League Cup final against Arsenal was held over until the following campaign.

=== Later years ===
After the Belles' second double in three years, long-serving manager Paul Edmunds considered retirement. He was persuaded to stay when three of the club's top players left for Knowsley United, who had reconstituted as Liverpool Ladies. Edmunds drafted in youngsters Claire Utley from the youth team and Vicky Exley from Sheffield Wednesday, but injuries to key players saw the team limp to a third-place finish in the Premier Division. In summer 1995 Edmunds stood down to be replaced by Mel Woodhall. A fixture backlog at the end of season 1995–96 saw Croydon playing five games in ten days, winning four and drawing one to erode the Belles' 13-point lead and win the National Premier Division on goal difference. In March 1996 the Belles played at Wembley in the Premier League Cup final. They conceded an injury-time penalty kick to draw 2–2 and then lost the penalty shootout.

In 1997 manager Julie Chipchase ascribed the loss of the Belles' pre-eminent status to a rise in the standards of other teams. In 1996–97 the club had been knocked out of both Cups by eventual winners Millwall Lionesses, and finished second in the League to Arsenal. The next two seasons saw third-placed finishes for the Belles, while 1999–2000 resulted in another FA Women's Cup final appearance when holders Arsenal were beaten in the semi-final. The final at Bramall Lane ended in a controversial 2–1 loss to Croydon, after Karen Walker had a penalty saved by Pauline Cope and Croydon scored a disputed winning goal. Five days later Croydon became the first club to retain the National Premier Division title. A 6–0 win over Aston Villa ensured a finish one point ahead of the second-placed Belles.

The next season began with an extensive recruitment drive; as England internationals Becky Easton and Karen Burke arrived from Everton and former stalwart Joanne Broadhurst rejoined the club from Croydon. When Croydon were taken over by Charlton Athletic, their veteran player-manager Debbie Bampton resigned and moved to the Belles in a playing capacity. Although they had finished as runners-up to Croydon in both league and cup, the club were overlooked for a place in the inaugural Charity Shield match. An article in The Guardian described the selection of Charlton Athletic and Arsenal as curious and related to unspecified "commercial reasons". The 2000–01 National Premier Division campaign saw the Belles return to top form, maintaining a 100% record until April, when a 1–0 home defeat to Arsenal handed the initiative to their southern rivals. Arsenal also knocked the Belles out of both cup competitions on their way to a domestic treble. In May 2001 a presentation marked the retirement of club captain Gillian Coultard.

Doncaster Belles did receive an invitation to the 2001–02 Charity Shield, where they were beaten 5–2 by Arsenal at Kingsmeadow. Goalkeeper Leanne Hall conceded a penalty, after her challenge on Clare Wheatley left the Arsenal player with a career-ending knee injury. Two weeks later at the teams' next meeting both sides lined up in tribute and Hall presented Wheatley with a bouquet of flowers. The match finished in a 4–1 defeat for the Belles. In the 2001–02 National Division Doncaster Belles finished as runners-up for the third season in succession, although in April 2002 they had "stunningly" inflicted a 4–0 defeat on Arsenal, the eventual champions' first league defeat in over two and a half years. In the Premier League Cup they suffered a shock semi final defeat by Birmingham City, collapsing from 3–1 ahead to lose 4–3 to the Northern Division leaders. The Belles knocked holders Arsenal out of the Women's FA Cup in the quarter finals, ending a run of six successive defeats—stretching back almost two years—against their old rivals. The BBC reported that the final whistle was "joyously celebrated" by the Doncaster Belles players. In the 2002 FA Women's Cup Final Doncaster Belles lost 2–1 to full-time professional Fulham before a crowd of 10,000 at Selhurst Park and a live television audience of two and a half million.

During the 2002 summer break Doncaster Belles turned semi–professional after securing a major sponsorship deal with Green Flag.

=== Merger with Doncaster Rovers ===
The Football Association had promised to create a professional women's league in 2003 and wanted clubs to merge with professional male counterparts as part of that strategy. In order to keep up with rivals who were already backed by men's clubs, the Belles were increasingly keen on finding their own link-up. A merger with Doncaster Rovers was considered at a meeting between representatives of both clubs on 3 April 2002, followed by EGMs five days later. In January 2003, Belles chairman John Gomersall met with the FA women's committee to discuss the merger. Rovers' existing women's team rejected the proposal by 77 votes to one at their AGM in March 2003. Nevertheless, in July 2003 the Doncaster Belles website announced the merger's completion. Under the terms of the agreement, the Belles would retain their financial and strategic independence. They also secured agreements to play a portion of home games at Belle Vue, to use the male club's Cantley Park training facility and to sell merchandise in Rovers' club shop. As a result, the Doncaster Belles, often described as "the most recognisable team name in the women's game", became Doncaster Rovers Belles. In 2011 Doncaster Rovers Belles was reconstituted as a Community Interest Company, run independently of Doncaster Rovers.

=== John Buckley era ===
In June 2003 former Celtic, Leeds United and Doncaster Rovers footballer John Buckley took over as manager.

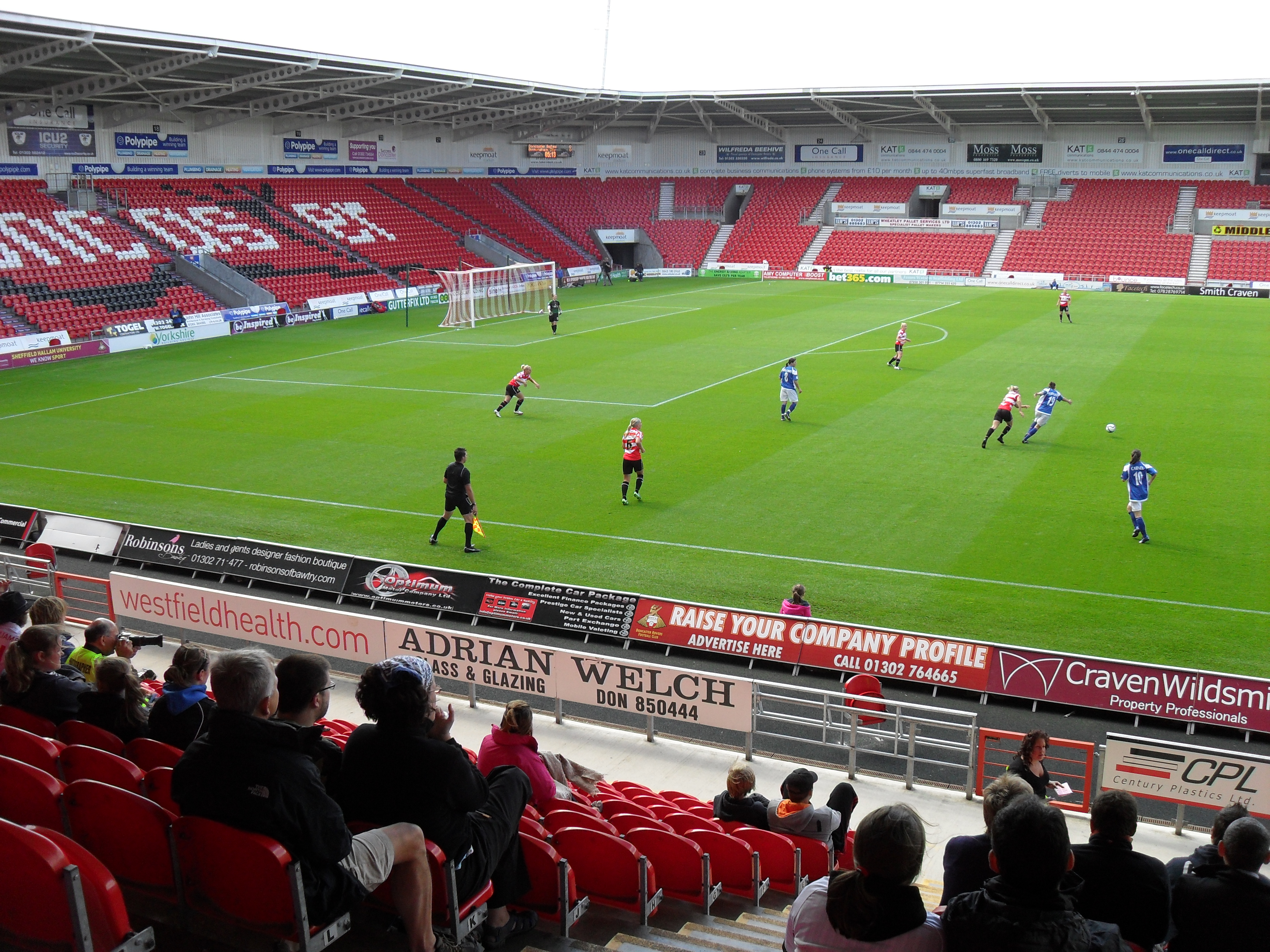
Doncaster Rovers Belles playing at Keepmoat Stadium in the FA WSL

Throughout his tenure at Doncaster Rovers Belles, Buckley placed a strong emphasis on youth development. This was partly because the club could no longer compete financially with rival clubs in the transfer market. In the 2008–09 season, they finished fourth in the league. On 26 February 2009, the team played in the 2009 FA Women's Premier League Cup final but lost 5–0 to Arsenal Ladies.

The club was one of eight founding teams in the FA WSL in April 2011.

In May 2012 the Belles reportedly agreed a three-year, six-figure sponsorship deal with Innovation Financial Services, a Bawtry–based company owned by ex-footballer Hugh McAuley & Doncaster businessman Stewart Groves. John Buckley explained that the sponsorship, the largest in the club's history, would allow the club to compete on a more equal footing with their WSL rivals. That deal collapsed in 2013 with Innovation Financial Services ceasing to trade.

Buckley left the club by mutual consent in September 2013, following the decision by the Football Association to demote the Belles from the top level. In April 2014 Buckley revealed that he left because the board appointed Julie Chipchase as director of football behind his back. He roundly criticised the role played by vice chairman Alan Smart: "We were friends and I felt like he went behind my back. I won't engage with him again."

==== Demotion ====
In April 2013 the Football Association announced that, as part of an FA WSL restructure and expansion, Manchester City would replace Doncaster Rovers Belles in the top tier in 2014. The Belles were placed in a new ten team FA WSL 2. Buckley described the situation as "the most farcical thing I've ever heard," while vice-chairman Alan Smart publicly ridiculed the FA for relegating the club after one league match, rendering the 2013 season meaningless.

The club appealed the decision and had the support of rival clubs. Arsenal Ladies' Vic Akers described the governing body's actions as "morally scandalous." At the televised 2013 FA Women's Cup final between Arsenal and Bristol Academy at Keepmoat Stadium, stewards disrupted a peaceful protest outside the ground, seizing a banner, flyers, petition and bells on the orders of the FA. In 2015 the new management of the Doncaster Rovers Belles described the FA's decision as having saved the club in retrospect, as the club faced administration due to mounting debts, reduced income from the FA and was saved by a group of local business people.

=== Gordon Staniforth era ===
On 6 November 2013 Gordon Staniforth was announced as the club's new head coach. He was to work under director of football and former manager Julie Chipchase, who led "a rigorous interview and practical coaching" application process. In season 2014 the Belles narrowly missed out on immediate promotion to the first tier of the FAWSL and Staniforth resigned at the end of the season. Staniforth cited budget restrictions as the reason he would not continue in the role.

=== Glen Harris era ===
In December 2014, former Lincoln Ladies manager, Glen Harris, was appointed Head Coach of the Doncaster Rovers Belles. In 2015 the team finished as runners-up again, the time behind Reading, but promotion was secured due to expansion of the top division. The club announced investment plans in October 2015, code named "Project Phoenix", which encompassed a switch to full-time professionalism and the building of a new training ground in Bawtry. Emily Simpkins signed a contract to become the club's first ever full-time professional player in November 2015. By February 2016, seven more players had signed full-time terms. Joining Simpkins were: Rhiannon Roberts, Courtney Sweetman-Kirk, Natasha Dowie, Becky Easton, Katrín Ómarsdóttir, Kasia Lipka and Carla Humphrey.

=== Emma Coates era ===
Harris was released from his role as Head Coach in June 2016 and Emma Coates took over the managerial reins becoming the youngest manager in FA WSL 1 at the age of 25. Under Emma Coates' management, the Belles bounced back from relegation to come second in the FA WSL 2 Spring Series, a competition devised to bridge the gap between the 2016 summer season and the switch back to a winter season for 2017–18. Coates left the club in October 2017 to take a position working with England's youth teams.

=== Neil Redfearn era ===
After a spell under Kate Rowson, the club appointed Neil Redfearn as head coach in December 2017. On 13 May 2018, the Belles won FA WSL 2, the Belles' first trophy since 1994. However, the club played in the third tier of English women's football for the 2018–19 season, having decided not to apply for the restructured top two tiers for financial reasons.

=== Andy Butler era ===
Doncaster-born ex-Doncaster Rovers captain Andy Butler was appointed manager on 16 January 2020. Andy Butler ended his term on 20 September 2022 after the game with Long Eaton

=== Nick Buxton era ===
Following the resignation of Andy Butler, Nick Buxton (previously assistant manager) was appointed as manager. He lost his first two games in charge during the 2022–23 season. After taking the team to its second-place finish in the 2022–23 season (for the second consecutive year) Buxton resigned on 5 June 2023 citing: "I have recently found it hard personally and mentally".

=== Sam Winch ===
Sam Winch was appointed as the new manager on 6 July 2023. He was unhappy to be sacked after only 10 matches, describing the club's decision as "farcical".

=== Ciarán Toner era ===
In November 2023 Ciarán Toner was appointed as the new manager.

After just over a year in charge with Belles languishing almost at the bottom of Division One North in relegation place, Toner left the club by mutual consent.

=== Amanda Greenslade era ===
In April 2025 Amanda Greenslade was appointed interim manager with only two games left of the 2024–25 season. The season finished with a loss to league champions Middlesbrough, followed by a 4–0 demolition of Huddersfield Town.

This was club stalwart Lindsey Tugby-Andrew, and supporters were later to find out her partner ex-Captain Jess Tugby-Andrew's final game for the Belles, both of whom joined Hull LFC ready for the new season.

Following a poor start to the 2025–26 season with only 6 points (2 wins) from 11 games Amanda resigned on 26 January 2026, with the club yet to decide who should replace her. Debbie Barry and Lynne Goodman (Assistant Managers) will stay with the club with their positions to be confirmed.

=== Dylan Wimbury era ===
On 7 February 2026 Dylan Wimbury was appointed manager of Doncaster Belles having previously been manager of Cheadle Town Stingers.

Debbie Barry and Lynne Goodman (Assistant Managers) are retained with the club alongside the appointment of Sam Cotterill.

As at 5 April under Dylan's tenure the Belles have delivered 2 draws and 5 losses (including one cup game involving a penalty shootout against local rivals Barnsley Ladies).

== Colours and crest ==
Crest from the Doncaster Belles era pre-2003

Doncaster Belles' original and current home colours

The club's traditional colours are yellow and blue. This was originally chosen in homage to the legendary Brazilian national team that won the 1970 FIFA World Cup. Following the link-up with Doncaster Rovers in 2003, the team wore Rovers' red and white hooped shirts with black shorts. They reverted to yellow and blue in 2014.

In 2019 the Belles renewed their links with Rovers under the auspices of 'Club Doncaster' and reinstated a red and white home kit. President Sheila Edmunds recalled that the club's first-ever kit had been red and white, and stated: "My passion has always been the yellow and blue because there's history behind that but as long as we have both colours in our home and away kit then I'm happy with that."

In the 2024–25 season, the club reverted again to the yellow and blue, with the red and white hoops being reserved for colour clashes at away games.

== Rivalries ==
Doncaster Rovers Belles enjoy a longstanding rivalry with Arsenal Ladies who eventually overtook the Belles as the leading club in English women's football. In 1994, the Belles' manager Paul Edmunds contrasted the northern, working class background of his players with the contrasting identity of the Arsenal team: "These soft Cockneys never done a hard day's work in their life. Never been down the pit, this lot [...]", despite women rarely, if ever, working down pits. Stressing the relative loyalty of Doncaster Belles' players, in comparison to those of other leading clubs, long-serving Karen Walker said in May 2003: "There's a feeling here that we are representing the north."

During the 2000s Doncaster Rovers Belles contested regular local derby fixtures with Leeds United Women. The rivalry was increased by several former Belles players defecting to Leeds. However, the 2010 failure of Leeds' WSL bid left Doncaster Rovers Belles as the only Yorkshire club playing at the top level.

Having self-relegated to FAWNL National Division One level in 2018, rivalries have since varied: when in the Division 1 Midlands, Belles' closest rivals were Lincoln City F.C. Women. However, Belles' move into Division 1 North in 2023 has rekindled old rivalries with Leeds United Women, as well as regularly playing against Huddersfield Town Women.

== Stadium ==
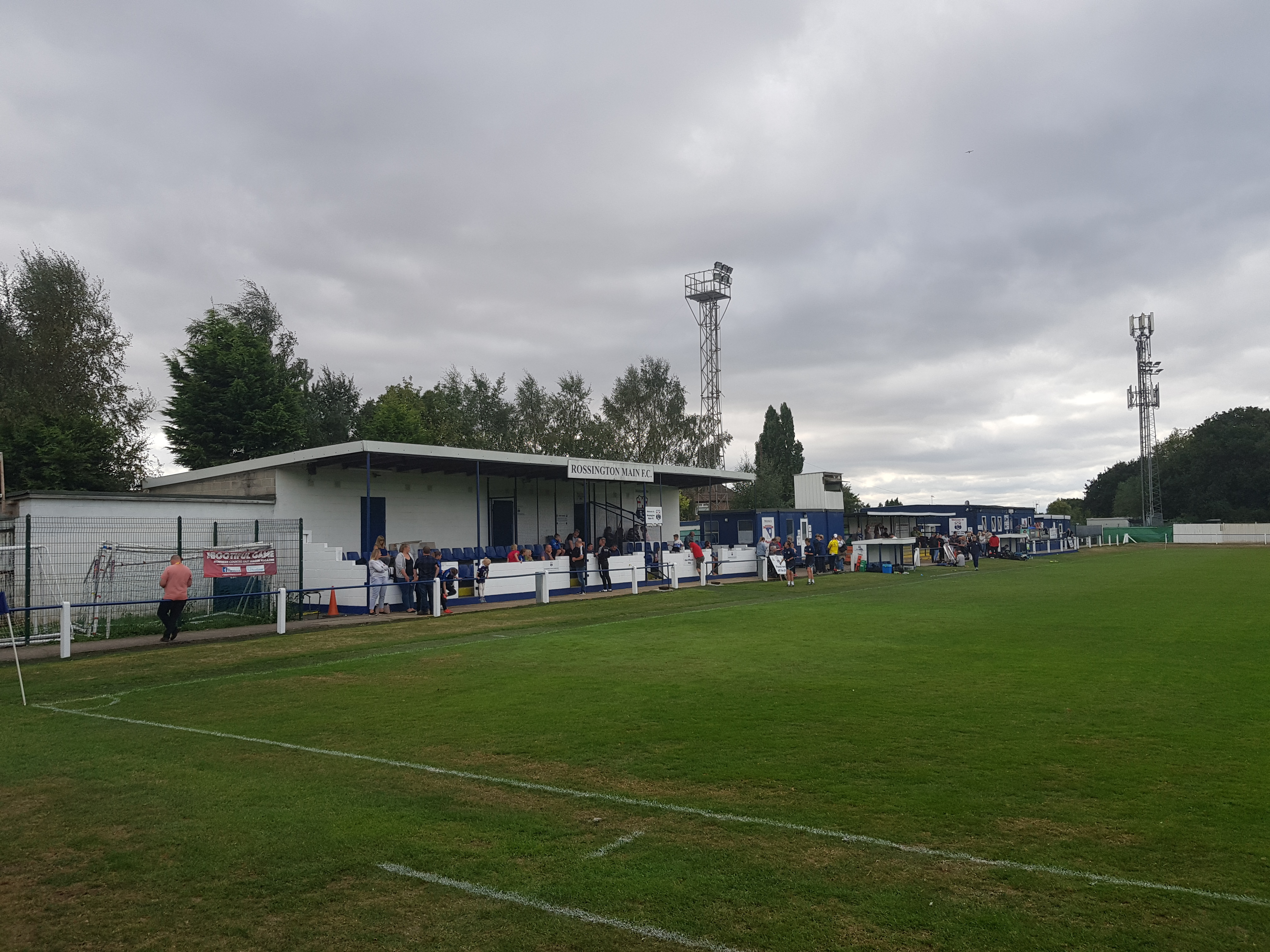
Former home of Doncaster Rovers Belles – Oxford Street, Rossington

When the English women's football setup was nationalised in 1991, the Belles became the first team to play their home games in a professional Football League ground at Belle Vue. However, they were often barred from doing so by Doncaster Rovers F.C. and had to find local non-League grounds in order to fulfil their fixtures.

In November 1997 long-serving secretary Alan Burton told The Times that after their spell at Belle Vue, the Belles had "left suddenly, under a bit of a cloud." At that stage, there was no connection at all between the Belles and Doncaster Rovers. The women's club were annoyed that Rovers had kept postponing Belles matches at short notice, ostensibly in order to save the Belle Vue pitch. According to Burton this caused the Belles a substantial loss of fan support.

In 1999 the club announced proposals for a purpose-built stadium at Toll Bar. The following year Doncaster Council granted the club a lease of some land in the area. The £1.6 million project was intended for the FA's launch of a professional women's League in 2003.

For many years the team played at the Welfare Ground (53°32′04″N 1°03′24″W), home of Armthorpe Welfare F.C., and in 2002 were playing at Brodsworth Welfare Ground (53°33′46″N 1°11′17″W), home of Brodsworth Welfare F.C. The 1999–2000 season was spent playing at Hatfield Main F.C.'s Broadway ground.

Between 2007 and 2018 the home of Doncaster Rovers Belles was the Keepmoat Stadium, although the majority of the team's matches prior to 2011 were played at the 500-capacity athletics track beside the stadium. In January 2007 the club's first match in the 15,000-capacity main stadium resulted in a 5–2 defeat to Leeds United, before a crowd of 1,797. Doncaster Rovers Belles played all their home fixtures in the FA Women's Super League inside the main arena.

After withdrawing their application for the FA Women's Championship, Doncaster Rovers Belles announced in August 2018 that they would play their home 2018–19 FA Women's National League matches at Rossington Main FC's Oxford Street ground.

From the 2022–23 FA Women's National League season they played their home matches at the Thorne Colliery F.C.'s Iqbal Poultry Stadium in Moorends.

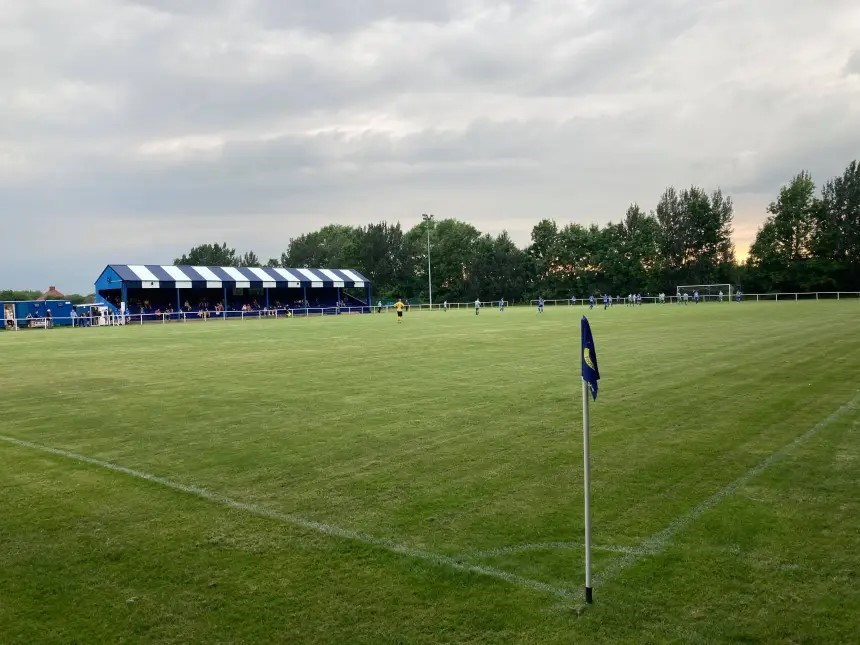
Former home of Doncaster Rovers Belles – Iqbal Stadium, Moorends

On 5 July 2024 Club Doncaster announced that The Belles would return to their main home ground of Eco-Power Stadium from the 24/25 season in Doncaster, South Yorkshire. However, due to constraints placed on the usage of the Eco-Power Stadium in order to preserve the pitch following an "extended period of inclement weather", the Belles completed the season by playing their home games at Tickhill Square, the home of Denaby United Juniors, despite the improving weather conditions as the season ended amidst the beginning of a drought. Additionally, two games were also played at Cannon Park, Retford, the home of Retford United.

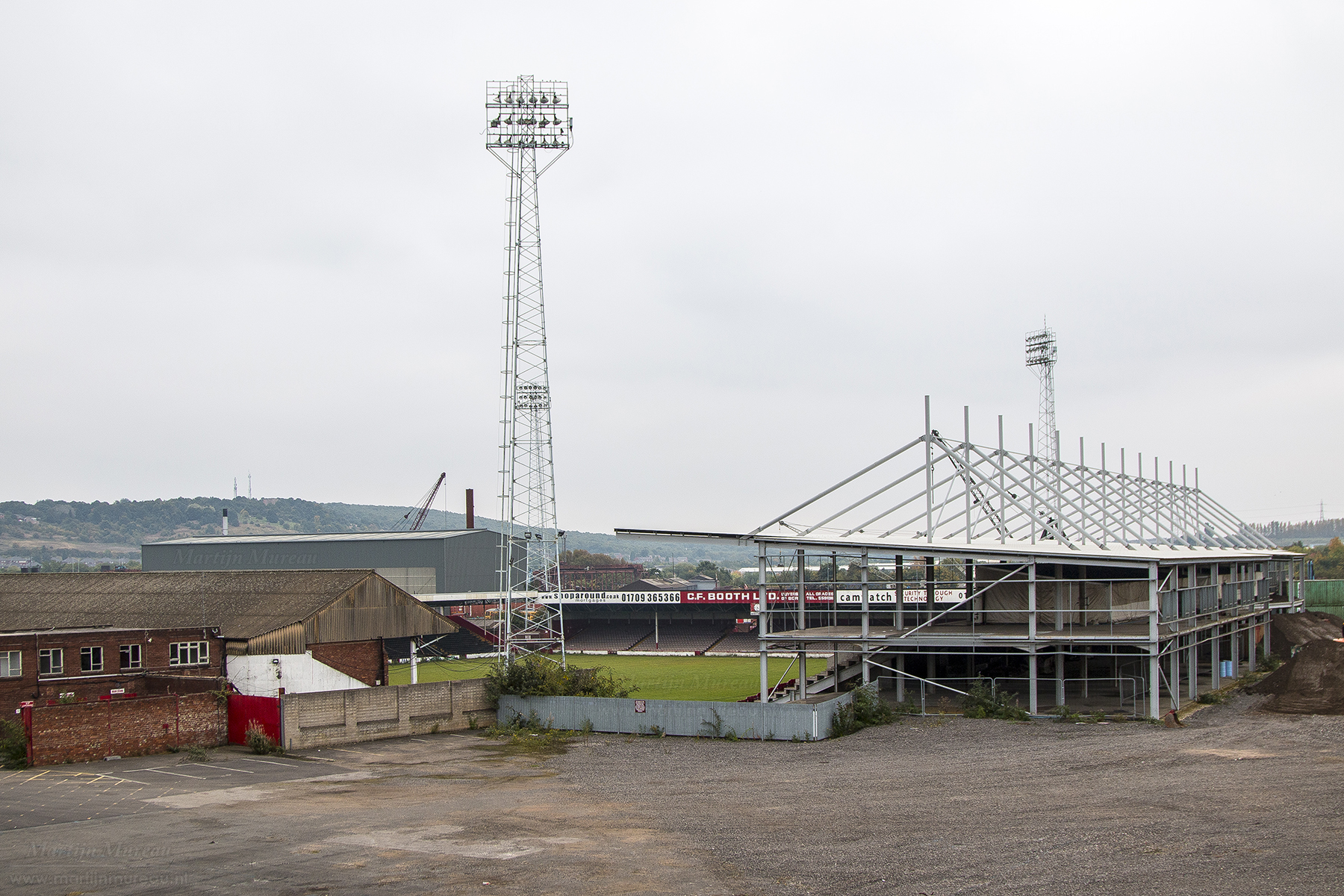
Millmoor – Doncaster Rovers Belles' temporary home 2025–26

In the summer of 2025, Belles CEO Chris Wood announced that Belles would play their 2025–26 home games at Millmoor, the former home of Rotherham United. At the same time, plans were unveiled for a permanent home for the Belles to be built in the coming months at the Club Doncaster Sports Complex at Lakeside, Doncaster.

== In popular culture ==
A BBC television documentary screened in January 1995, called The Belles, featured the squad winning and then celebrating their double win the previous Spring. However, the 'work hard, play hard' ethos revealed in the film did not find universal favour and the club was censured by the FA. Team captain Gillian Coultard felt the film led to her being controversially stripped of the England captaincy in the run-up to the 1995 FIFA Women's World Cup.

The following year a book entitled I Lost My Heart To The Belles told the story of the club's 1994–95 campaign through the eyes of journalist and author Pete Davies. In April 2000 the Doncaster Rovers Belles squad released the first ever FA Women's Cup final song, entitled "Northern Pride".

In 1998 the BBC television drama series Playing the Field began. Directly inspired by Doncaster Rovers Belles, it was written by Kay Mellor, starred James Nesbitt and Ricky Tomlinson, and ran for five series' until 2002.

== Current Playing Squad 2025–26 ==
As of 24 October 2025.

Note: Flags indicate national team as defined under FIFA eligibility rules; some limited exceptions apply. Players may hold more than one non-FIFA nationality.

No.	Pos.	Nation	Player
1	GK	ENG	Eleanor Sharpe
2	DF	ENG	Ryley Johnson
3	DF	ENG	Ruby Pitter
4	MF	ENG	Emily Cahill
5	DF	ENG	Stephanie Rigby
6	MF	ENG	Kazia Walby
7	MF	ENG	Abi Coley
8	MF	ENG	Laila Abadi
9	FW	ENG	Jasmine Saxton
10	MF	ENG	Hannah McWilliams (captain)
11	DF	ENG	Ruby Jex-Oldfield
12	MF	ENG	Betty Cheetham
13	MF	USA	Megumi Shenton
14	DF	ENG	Ellie Ball
15	DF	ENG	Katie Yates
16	FW	ENG	Arianne Parnham
17	FW	ENG	Maisie Everitt
18	MF	ENG	Holly Key

No.	Pos.	Nation	Player
19	FW	ENG	Marelle Carlisle
20	GK	ENG	Sophia Lewis
21	MF	ENG	Abigail Precious
22	MF	ENG	Charley Evans.
23	MF	ENG	Taylah Charlton
24	MF	ENG	Sienna Hitchings
25	MF	ENG	Vic Chincharo
26	MF	ENG	Natalie Banaszczyk
27	FW	ENG	Holly Findlay
28	FW	ENG	Alisha Appleby
29	FW	ENG	Jodie Gregory
32	MF	ENG	Mia Turner
99	GK	ENG	Scarlette Slater-Rowley
—		ENG	Charlotte Gowlett
—		ENG	Georgia Strickland

=== English Football Hall of Fame ===
The following have played for Doncaster Rovers Belles and have been inducted into the English Football Hall of Fame :

Players

- (England) Debbie Bampton (2005 Inductee)
- (England) Gillian Coultard (2006 Inductee)
- (England) Karen Walker (2007 Inductee)

Last updated: 18 January 2020.
Source: list of NFM Hall of Fame inductees

=== Current board and coaching staff ===
As of 24 October 2025.

Job title
(England) Chris Wood	Chief executive
(England) Sheila Edmunds	Club president
(England) Amanda Greenslade	Manager
(Northern Ireland) Debbie Barry	Assistant Manager
(England) Lynn Goodman	Assistant Manager
(England) Lewis Cross	Goalkeeping Coach
(England) Lydia Wade	Physio
(England) Joe Phillips	Strength & Conditioning Coach
(England) Sophie Brown	Player Care
(England) Chantelle Haigh	Regional Talent Centre manager
(England) Vacant	RTC technical director

== Honours ==
Doncaster Rovers Belles won two of the first three National Division titles in 1992 and 1994. They have also finished as runners-up on seven further occasions; in 1993, 1996, 1997, 2000, 2001, 2002 and 2003.

The FA Women's Cup has been won six times, during a period of dominance which saw the Belles reach eleven out of twelve Cup finals from 1983 to 1994. Doncaster Rovers Belles also reached the finals in 2000 and 2002, but lost out to Croydon and Fulham, respectively. Their record in the competition is behind that of Arsenal Ladies, who have 13 wins in total, and Southampton, who were victorious eight times in the early years of the competition.

The club has been less successful in the FA Women's Premier League Cup, reaching the final three times. A loss on penalties to Wembley in 1996 came between two heavy defeats to Arsenal in 1994 and 2009.

Doncaster Rovers Belles also competed for the FA Women's Community Shield in 2001 and 2003, but were beaten by Arsenal and then Fulham.

=== Domestic ===
==== League ====
- FA Women's Premier League National Division (National Tier 1): (Note: Up until 1991, there was no top national division of English women's football; from then, until the formation of the FA WSL in 2010, it was the FA Women's Premier League National Division. The FA only took over the direct running of the domestic league structure from the WFA in 1993.) 2
  - 1991–92, 1993–94
- FA WSL 2 (National Tier 2): 1
  - 2017–18
- North East Regional League: 2
  - 1989–90, 1990–91
- Nottinghamshire League: 11
  - 1976–77, 1977–78, 1978–79, 1980–81, 1981–82, 1982–83, 1984–85, 1985–86, 1986–87, 1987–88, 1988–89

==== Cups ====
- FA Women's Cup: 6
  - 1982–83, 1986–87, 1987–88, 1989–90, 1991–92, 1993–94

=== Doubles ===
- League and FA Women's Cup: 2
  - 1991–92, 1993–94

== See also ==
- List of women's association football clubs in England and Wales
- Women's football in England
- List of women's association football clubs

== Bibliography ==
- Davies, Pete (1996). I Lost My Heart To The Belles. Mandarin. ISBN 0-7493-2085-0.
