= 1982–83 WFA Cup =

Tournament details
- Country: England & Wales

Final positions
- Champions: Doncaster Belles
- Runners-up: St Helens
- Penalty shoot-outs do not count towards the total number of goals.

The 1982–83 WFA Cup was an association football knockout tournament for women's teams, held between 10 October 1982 and 8 May 1983. It was the 13th season of the WFA Cup and was won by Doncaster Belles, who defeated St Helens in the final.

The tournament consisted seven rounds of competition proper.

All match results and dates from the Women's FA Cup Website.

== Group A ==
=== First round proper ===
All games were scheduled for 10 October 1982.

Tie	Home team (tier)	Score	Away team (tier)	Att.
1	Chard	6–7	St Catherines	
2	Exeter	4–3	Tiverton	
3	Exmouth	0–3	Newport	
4	Illogan	4–2	Pelynt	
Bye: Cardiff, Exeter Rangers, Frome, Western Trust

=== Second rounder proper ===
All games were originally scheduled for 7 November 1982.

Tie	Home team (tier)	Score	Away team (tier)	Att.
1	Cardiff	6–1	Frome	
2	Exeter	7–3	Newport	
3	Illogan	1–0	Exeter Rangers	
4	Western Trust	5–1	St Catherines	

=== Third rounder proper ===
All games were originally scheduled for 5 December 1982.

Tie	Home team (tier)	Score	Away team (tier)	Att.
1	Cardiff	H–W	Western Trust	
Walkover for Cardiff
2	Exeter	4–3	Illogan	

== Group B ==
=== First round proper ===
All games were scheduled for 10 October 1982.

Tie	Home team (tier)	Score	Away team (tier)	Att.
1	Ashford Town	3–1	Horsham	
2	Courthope	0–4	Reigate	
3	Gillingham	11–1	Hassocks Beacon	
4	Herne Bay	0–6	Brighton	
5	Maidstone	H–W	Sussex University	
Walkover for Maidstone
6	Shoreham	4–1	Eastbourne	
7	Southwick Giants	6–1	Durrington Rebels	
8	Worthing	0–2	C&C Sports	

=== Second rounder proper ===
All games were originally scheduled for 7 November 1982.

Tie	Home team (tier)	Score	Away team (tier)	Att.
1	Ashford Town	5–3	Southwick Giants	
2	Brighton	1–4	C&C Sports	
3	Reigate	2–1	Gillingham	
4	Shoreham	4–1	Maidstone	

=== Third rounder proper ===
All games were originally scheduled for 5 December 1982.

Tie	Home team (tier)	Score	Away team (tier)	Att.
1	Ashford Town	0–7	C&C Sports	
2	Reigate	1–2	Shoreham	

== Group C ==
=== First round proper ===
All games were scheduled for 10 October 1982.

Tie	Home team (tier)	Score	Away team (tier)	Att.
1	Amersham Angels	1–4	Warminster	
2	Aylesbury	9–0	Hightown	
3	Bournemouth	2–6	Newbury	
4	Cope Chat	5–2	Swindon Spitfires	
5	Red Star Southampton	1–8	Howbury Grange	
6	Southampton	10–2	Bracknell	
Bye: Old Actonians, Reading

=== Second rounder proper ===
All games were originally scheduled for 7 November 1982.

Tie	Home team (tier)	Score	Away team (tier)	Att.
1	Aylesbury	1–0	Southampton	
2	Cope Chat	8–0	Reading	
3	Howbury Grange	2–1	Newbury	
4	Warminster	H–W	Old Actonians	
Walkover for Warminster

=== Third rounder proper ===
All games were originally scheduled for 5 December 1982.

Tie	Home team (tier)	Score	Away team (tier)	Att.
1	Cope Chat	2–3	Warminster	
2	Howbury Grange	6–1	Aylesbury	

== Group D ==
=== First round proper ===
All games were scheduled for 10 October 1982.

Tie	Home team (tier)	Score	Away team (tier)	Att.
1	Chingford	13–1	Hayes	
2	Feltham United	19–0	University of Surrey	
3	Lowestoft	7–4	Millwall Lionesses	
4	Norwich	H–W	Cove Krakatoa	
Walkover for Norwich
5	Spurs	6–2	Croydon	
6	Suffolk Bluebirds	5–2	Gallaher	
7	Tottenham	19–0	Turnford	
8	West Ham United	8–1	Riverside	

=== Second rounder proper ===
All games were originally scheduled for 7 November 1982.

Tie	Home team (tier)	Score	Away team (tier)	Att.
1	Chingford	4–1	West Ham United	
2	Norwich	1–1 (a.e.t.)	Feltham United	
replay	Feltham United	4–1	Norwich	
3	Suffolk Bluebirds	2–10	Lowestoft	
4	Tottenham	3–4	Spurs	

=== Third rounder proper ===
All games were originally scheduled for 5 December 1982.

Tie	Home team (tier)	Score	Away team (tier)	Att.
1	Lowestoft	6–0	Feltham United	
2	Spurs	2–2 (a.e.t.)	Chingford	
replay	Chingford	3–4	Spurs	

== Group E ==
=== First round proper ===
All games were scheduled for 10 October 1982.

Tie	Home team (tier)	Score	Away team (tier)	Att.
1	Birmingham Thistle	A–W	Birmingham City	
Walkover for Birmingham City
2	Burton Wanderers	3–2	Droitwich St. Andrews	
3	EMGALS	17–0	Duston Two Tones	
4	Notts Forest	1–6	Biggleswade United	
5	Notts Rangers	2–0	Notts County	
6	Solihull	6–0	Notts Victoria	
7	Worcester City	5–0	Uttoxeter Eagles	
8	Worcester Rangers	6–0	Leicester	

=== Second rounder proper ===
All games were originally scheduled for 7 November 1982.

Tie	Home team (tier)	Score	Away team (tier)	Att.
1	Biggleswade United	5–0	Worcester City	
2	Birmingham City	5–1	Burton Wanderers	
3	Solihull	5–2	Notts Rangers	
4	Worcester Rangers	1–4	EMGALS	

=== Third rounder proper ===
All games were originally scheduled for 5 December 1982.

Tie	Home team (tier)	Score	Away team (tier)	Att.
1	Birmingham City	2–3	Solihull	
2	EMGALS	5–2	Biggleswade United	

== Group F ==
=== First round proper ===
All games were scheduled for 10 October 1982.

Tie	Home team (tier)	Score	Away team (tier)	Att.
1	Broadoak	0–1	St Helens	
2	Daresbury	5–1	New Longton	
3	Deeside	8–3	Manor Athletic	
4	Fodens	1–3	Preston Rangers	
5	Preston North End	4–3	Crewe Permanent Way	
6	Rochdale Borough	4–7	Kirkby Sports Centre	
7	Rossendale	4–0	Macclesfield	
8	Thornton ICI	0–7	Manchester Corinthians	

=== Second rounder proper ===
All games were originally scheduled for 7 November 1982.

Tie	Home team (tier)	Score	Away team (tier)	Att.
1	Daresbury	0–2	Kirkby Sports Centre	
2	Manchester Corinthians	2–5	St Helens	
3	Preston North End	2–0	Rossendale	
4	Preston Rangers	2–0	Deeside	

=== Third rounder proper ===
All games were originally scheduled for 5 December 1982.

Tie	Home team (tier)	Score	Away team (tier)	Att.
1	Kirkby Sports Centre	1–1 (a.e.t.)	St Helens	
replay	St Helens	4–0	Kirkby Sports Centre	
2	Preston North End	1–5	Preston Rangers	

== Group G ==
=== First round proper ===
All games were scheduled for 10 October 1982.

Tie	Home team (tier)	Score	Away team (tier)	Att.
1	Alsager	1–3	Middlesbrough	
2	BP Chemicals	0–10	Kilnhurst	
3	Bronte	3–0	Manchester United Supporters	
4	Doncaster Belles	11–0	Wythenshawe	
5	Percy Main	0–4	Cleveland Spartans	
6	Rotherham	18–0	Manchester University	
7	Rowntrees	1–2	CP Doncaster	
8	Sheffield	3–1	Herrington Burn	

=== Second rounder proper ===
All games were originally scheduled for 7 November 1982.

Tie	Home team (tier)	Score	Away team (tier)	Att.
1	Bronte	0–1	Cleveland Spartans	
2	Middlesbrough	1–4	CP Doncaster	
3	Rotherham	2–4	Kilnhurst	
4	Sheffield	0–3	Doncaster Belles	

=== Third rounder proper ===
All games were originally scheduled for 5 December 1982.

Tie	Home team (tier)	Score	Away team (tier)	Att.
1	CP Doncaster	2–3	Doncaster Belles	
2	Kilnhurst	0–1	Cleveland Spartans	

== Group H ==
=== First round proper ===
All games were scheduled for 10 October 1982.

Tie	Home team (tier)	Score	Away team (tier)	Att.
1	Colchester	1–7	Stevenage	
2	Edgware	0–6	Luton Daytel	
3	Friends of Fulham	16–0	Hampstead Heathens	
4	Milton Keynes	4–0	Hemel Hempstead	
5	Northwood	0–7	Shelburne	
6	Romford	3–0	Dunstable	
7	Town & County	5–1	Watford	
Bye: Costessey

=== Second rounder proper ===
All games were originally scheduled for 7 November 1982.

Tie	Home team (tier)	Score	Away team (tier)	Att.
1	Luton Daytel	4–1	Costessey	
2	Romford	0–12	Friends of Fulham	
3	Stevenage	0–3	Milton Keynes	
4	Town & County	0–6	Shelburne	

=== Third rounder proper ===
All games were originally scheduled for 5 December 1982.

Tie	Home team (tier)	Score	Away team (tier)	Att.
1	Milton Keynes	1–3	Friends of Fulham	
2	Shelburne	4–1	Luton Daytel	

== Fourth round proper ==
All games were originally scheduled for 9 January 1983.

Tie	Home team (tier)	Score	Away team (tier)	Att.
1	C&C Sports	2–3	Cleveland Spartans	
2	Cardiff	6–1	Shoreham Orient	
3	EMGALS	1–2 (a.e.t.)	Preston Rangers	
4	Exeter	1–6	Friends of Fulham	
5	Shelburne	0–10	St Helens	
6	Solihull	0–2	Howbury Grange	
7	Spurs	1–7	Doncaster Belles	
8	Warminster	7–0	Lowestoft	

== Quarter–finals ==
All games were played on 6 February 1983.

Tie	Home team (tier)	Score	Away team (tier)	Att.
1	Cardiff	2–5	Friends of Fulham	
2	Doncaster Belles	4–2	Cleveland Spartans	
3	Preston Rangers	3–2 (a.e.t.)	Howbury Grange	
4	St Helens	1–0	Warminster	

== Semi–finals ==
All games were played on 13 March 1983.

Tie	Home team (tier)	Score	Away team (tier)	Att.
1	Friends of Fulham	1–2	Doncaster Belles	
2	St Helens	5–1	Preston Rangers	

== Final ==
8 May 1983
14:30 BST

Doncaster Belles	3–2	St Helens
Stocks; J. Hanson	Report	Leatherbarrow; Deighan

Sincil Bank, Lincoln
Attendance: 1,500
Referee: Arnold Challinor (Rotherham)
