= 1988–89 WFA Cup =

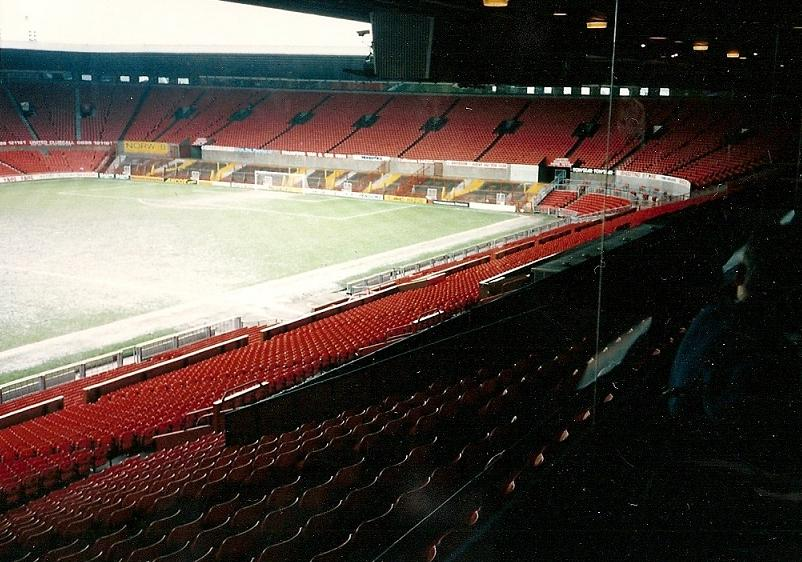
- Old Trafford, which hosted the 1989 Final

Tournament details
- Country: England
- Dates: 1988 – April 1989

Final positions
- Champions: Leasowe Pacific
- Runners-up: Friends of Fulham

The 1988–89 Women's Football Association Cup was the 19th edition of the WFA Cup (Women's FA Cup), the national women's football knockout competition in England. It was organised by the Women's Football Association (WFA).

The Merseyside club Leasowe Pacific won the trophy in the 1989 WFA Cup Final – the match was played on 22 April, in the aftermath of the Hillsborough disaster the previous week. Three Leasowe players saw the tragedy at close hand, and the women's Final was nearly cancelled.

The WFA Cup finalist clubs were Friends of Fulham, who had been the 1985 Cup–winners, and Leasowe Pacific, the runners–up of the 1988 Final against Doncaster Belles. The 1989 Final had a prominent broadcast on TV with "almost 2 million" viewers.

The 1989 Cup was Leasowe Pacific's only title; the club later became Everton.

== Group A ==
=== First round proper ===
All games were scheduled for 25 September 1988.

Tie	Home team (tier)	Score	Away team (tier)	Att.
1	Canley Social	H–W	Beacon Wanderers	
Walkover for Beacon Wanderers
2	Droitwich St. Andrews	4–1	Wyvern	
3	Holly Lane	1–5	Tavern	
4	Ingol Belles	4–6	Crewe	
5	Sefton Rebels	1–10	Fodens	
Bye: Preston Rangers

=== Second round proper ===
All games were originally scheduled for 16 October 1988.

Tie	Home team (tier)	Score	Away team (tier)	Att.
1	Crewe	10–0	Beacon Wanderers	
2	Droitwich St. Andrews	6–3	Fodens	
3	Preston Rangers	H–W	Tavern	
Walkover for Preston Rangers

== Group B ==
=== First round proper ===
All games were scheduled for 25 September 1988.

Tie	Home team (tier)	Score	Away team (tier)	Att.
1	Gallaher	0–11	Arsenal	
2	Hemel Hempstead	5–1	Vixens	
3	Islington	10–1	Hackney	
4	Sutton	A–W	Chelsea	
Walkover for Chelsea
5	Vicarage Wanderers	A–W	Chingford	
Walkover for Chingford
6	Walton & Hersham	4–2 (a.e.t.)	Maidstone Tigresses	

=== Second round proper ===
All games were originally scheduled for 16 October 1988.

Tie	Home team (tier)	Score	Away team (tier)	Att.
1	Arsenal	1–1 (a.e.t.)	Islington	
replay	Islington	2–3	Arsenal	
2	Chelsea	2–7	Chingford	
3	Hemel Hempstead	2–4	Walton & Hersham	

== Group C ==
=== First round proper ===
All games were scheduled for 25 September 1988.

Tie	Home team (tier)	Score	Away team (tier)	Att.
1	Dunstable	2–3	Oxford & County	
2	Ipswich	2–4	Biggleswade	
3	Leighton Linslade	0–9	Spondon Leisure Centre	
4	Milton Keynes	2–0	Launton	
5	Watford	2–5	Town & County	
Bye: Pye

=== Second round proper ===
All games were originally scheduled for 16 October 1988.

Tie	Home team (tier)	Score	Away team (tier)	Att.
1	Biggleswade	3–1	Town & County	
2	Oxford & County	3–0	Milton Keynes	
3	Spondon Leisure Centre	7–1	Pye	

== Group D ==
=== First round proper ===
All games were scheduled for 25 September 1988.

Tie	Home team (tier)	Score	Away team (tier)	Att.
1	Cardiff	H–W	Clevedon	
2	Frome	1–3	Taunton Trident	
3	Leisure Line	2–2 (a.e.t.)	Crewkerne	
replay	Crewkerne	9–5	Leisure Line	
4	Plymouth Pilgrims	10–0	Exeter Rangers	
5	Truro City	14–0	Exeter	
Bye: Pelynt

=== Second round proper ===
All games were originally scheduled for 16 October 1988.

Tie	Home team (tier)	Score	Away team (tier)	Att.
1	Cardiff	1–0	Truro City	
2	Crewkerne	2–8	Plymouth Pilgrims	
3	Taunton Trident	14–0	Pelynt	

== Group E ==
=== First round proper ===
All games were scheduled for 25 September 1988.

Tie	Home team (tier)	Score	Away team (tier)	Att.
1	Chesterfield	2–4	BYC Argyle (Burwell Youth Club)	
2	Ilkeston	9–0	East Leake	
3	Notts County	5–0	G.E.C. / A.E.I.	
4	Notts Rangers	2–1	Mexborough College	
5	Rugby	0–4	Sheffield	
Bye: Rainworth Miners Welfare

=== Second round proper ===
All games were originally scheduled for 16 October 1988.

Tie	Home team (tier)	Score	Away team (tier)	Att.
1	BYC Argyle (Burwell Youth Club)	1–1 (a.e.t.)	Notts County	
replay	Notts County	1–3	BYC Argyle (Burwell Youth Club)	
2	Notts Rangers	10–0	Ilkeston	
3	Sheffield	1–2	Rainworth Miners Welfare	

== Group F ==
=== First round proper ===
All games were scheduled for 25 September 1988.

Tie	Home team (tier)	Score	Away team (tier)	Att.
1	Cove Krakatoa	1–0	Hightown	
2	District Line	4–1	Southwick	
3	Millwall Lionesses	11–0	Swindon Spitfires	
4	Reading	0–14	Bournemouth	
5	Solent	2–1	Bracknell	
Bye: Newbury

=== Second round proper ===
All games were originally scheduled for 16 October 1988.

Tie	Home team (tier)	Score	Away team (tier)	Att.
1	Bournemouth	1–4	Newbury	
2	Cove Krakatoa	4–0	District Line	
3	Millwall Lionesses	10–1	Solent	

== Group G ==
=== First round proper ===
All games were scheduled for 25 September 1988.

Tie	Home team (tier)	Score	Away team (tier)	Att.
1	Broadoak	1–0	Leek Town	
2	Ladyblues	1–0	Rossendale	
3	Manchester United	8–1	Huddersfield	
4	Oakland Rangers	1–3	Wythenshawe	
5	St Helens	1–2	Filey Flyers	
6	Whitehouse Rovers	1–2	Wigan	

=== Second round proper ===
All games were originally scheduled for 16 October 1988.

Tie	Home team (tier)	Score	Away team (tier)	Att.
1	Broadoak	1–4	Manchester United	
2	Filey Flyers	11–0	Ladyblues	
3	Wigan	2–1	Wythenshawe	

== Group H ==
=== First round proper ===
All games were scheduled for 25 September 1988.

Tie	Home team (tier)	Score	Away team (tier)	Att.
1	Broadbridge Heath	10–1	Ashford Town	
2	Gillingham	A–W	Maidstone Mote United	
Walkover for Maidstone Mote United
3	Handcross	0–11	Hassocks Beacon	
4	Reigate	10–0	Shoreham	
5	Worthing	H–W	Crawley	
Walkover for Worthing
Bye: C&C Sports

=== Second round proper ===
All games were originally scheduled for 16 October 1988.

Tie	Home team (tier)	Score	Away team (tier)	Att.
1	Broadbridge Heath	0–4	Reigate	
2	C&C Sports	3–1	Maidstone Mote United	
3	Hassocks Beacon	8–1	Worthing	

== Third round proper ==
All games were originally scheduled for 6 November 1988.

Tie	Home team (tier)	Score	Away team (tier)	Att.
1	Abbeydale	2–0	Wigan	
2	Birmingham City	8–4	Spondon Leisure Centre	
3	Bronte	4–0	Filey Flyers	
4	BYC Argyle (Burwell Youth Club)	2–6	Taunton Trident	
5	Cardiff	0–9	Leasowe Pacific	
6	Cleveland Spartans	0–5	Doncaster Belles	
7	Cove Krakatoa	7–0	C&C Sports	
8	Crewe	4–6	Plymouth Pilgrims	
9	Droitwich St. Andrews	0–5	Biggleswade	
10	Friends of Fulham	8–1	Oxford & County	
11	Manchester United	0–6	Millwall Lionesses	
12	Newbury	4–5	Reigate	
13	Notts Rangers	5–3	Arsenal	
14	Rainworth Miners Welfare	0–2	Preston Rangers	
15	Red Star Southampton	5–0	Hassocks Beacon	
16	Walton & Hersham	3–0	Chingford	

== Fourth round proper ==
All games were originally scheduled for 5 and 11 December 1988.

Tie	Home team (tier)	Score	Away team (tier)	Att.
1	Cove Krakatoa	1–2	Biggleswade	
2	Friends of Fulham	3–2	Birmingham City	
3	Leasowe Pacific	3–1	Reigate	
4	Millwall Lionesses	2–0	Preston Rangers	
5	Plymouth Pilgrims	0–12	Doncaster Belles	
6	Red Star Southampton	3–0	Abbeydale	
7	Taunton Trident	2–4	Notts Rangers	
8	Walton & Hersham	1–3	Bronte	

== Quarter–finals ==
All games were played on 5 February 1989.

The 1988 finalists, Leasowe and Doncaster Belles, were drawn together in the 1988–89 quarter–finals. This time, Leasowe defeated Doncaster, the champions of the previous two seasons, who were the strongest team in the women's Cup for many years. This defeat would remain Doncaster Belles' only WFA Cup loss outside of a Final between 1983 and 1994.

Tie	Home team (tier)	Score	Away team (tier)	Att.
1	Biggleswade	1–2	Notts Rangers	
2	Bronte	3–2	Millwall Lionesses	
3	Doncaster Belles	1–2	Leasowe Pacific	
4	Friends of Fulham	2–1	Red Star Southampton	

== Semi–finals ==
All games were played on 5 March 1989.

In the semi–finals, striker Louise Thomas scored a hat–trick for Leasowe against Nottingham Rangers, in a 3–0 win at Sincil Bank, Lincoln on 5 March. Friends of Fulham played their semi–final against Bronte L.F.C. on the same day at the same venue, a 3–0 win for Fulham.

Tie	Home team (tier)	Score	Away team (tier)	Att.
1	Friends of Fulham	3–0	Bronte	
2	Leasowe Pacific	3–0	Notts Rangers	

== Hillsborough disaster ==
One week before the women's Cup Final was scheduled, the Hillsborough disaster caused the deaths of 94 Liverpool fans, ultimately 96, and caused injuries to 766, due to a fatal crush in the crowd at the men's FA Cup semi–final match on Saturday 15 April 1989.

Three of the Leasowe Pacific players were at the Hillsborough match, as regular Liverpool F.C. supporters, in the Leppings Lane End with their team manager's daughter. All four were uninjured. The women's League game the following day between Leasowe and St Helens was cancelled, "as a mark of respect for the Hillsborough victims".

After the traumatic events, Leasowe decided to participate in the women's Cup Final as scheduled, when given the choice of cancelling by the organisers and by Friends of Fulham. The Leasowe manager, Billy Jackson, who had played for the Liverpool junior team, said "I don't know whether we have [made] the right decision or not", adding that the general consensus in discussions favoured going ahead with the game.

At the women's Cup Final on 22 April, a minute's silence was observed and black armbands were worn. The day after the Final, the players of Leasowe laid a memorial wreath on the pitch at Anfield, accompanied by the Fulham team. They were not joined by Leasowe midfielder Cathy Gore, who had been at Hillsborough; Billy Jackson explained, "Cathy told us she could not go to Anfield again."

== Final ==
In the seventh minute, Janice Murray gave Leasowe the lead from a cross by Harper, but Hope Powell equalised a minute later, "with a crisp shot after a good move". Powell's second goal made the score 2–1 for Fulham at half–time, scoring from a "snap volley" that took a "wicked deflection".

In the second half, Fulham goalkeeper Theresa Wiseman saved to prevent goals by Louise Thomas and Maureen Mallon (Mo Marley), but Leasowe levelled the game at 2–2 when Louise Thomas scored after having several chances. Another goal, by Joy McQuiggan, made it 3–2 to Leasowe with fifteen minutes remaining. Friends of Fulham could have equalised again when Marieanne Spacey crossed to Libby Hughes, but Leasowe goalkeeper Stewart made a diving save, which ensured victory for Leasowe Pacific, 3–2.

Four players were singled out for praise in the Liverpool Echo match report:

I imagine a good many sides would like to be able to call on a pair of strikers like Leasowe's Marie [Maria] Harper and Louise Thomas. The pair have scored nearly 100 goals between them this season [...] The ball control of players like Fulham's attacking midfielder Hope Powell and their brilliant centre-back Marieanne Spacey, who recently turned down an offer to play professionally in Italy, had such a knowledgable critic as former PFA secretary Cliff Lloyd applauding with enthusiasm.

The match was televised the next day on Channel Four, the first of five successive WFA Cup finals shown by the station. Julie Welch presented a one–hour program at 5:30pm on Sunday 23 April. Although the BBC had shown the WFA Cup before, this game was reportedly "the first to be televised specifically for highlights the following day".

=== Match details ===
22 April 1989
14:00 BST

Friends of Fulham	2–3	Leasowe Pacific
Powell	Report	Murray; Thomas; McQuiggan

Old Trafford, Manchester
Attendance: 914
Referee: Roger Dilkes (Mossley)

Note: Louise Thomas is named as scorer explicitly in matchday reports; the second goal has also later been attributed to her team–mate Jill Thomas.

== Later developments ==
The winning goalscorer in the 1989 Final, Joy McQuiggan, went on to play in the 1994 FA Women's Cup Final for Knowsley United (now Liverpool) and played in the 1997 FA Women's Premier League Cup Final for Leasowe's inheritor club, Everton

Hope Powell has had a highly decorated career in football, and later won two Women's FA Cups. Leasowe player Mo Marley, later a FA WPL champion and England player and coach, managed Everton to victory in the 2009–10 FA Women's Cup.

FA historian David Barber said the 1989 match was the only women's football game at Old Trafford until 2012, although England drew 0–0 with Norway in UEFA Women's Euro 1991 qualifying before 435 fans on 2 September 1990.

== See also ==
- Women's FA Cup
- 1989 European women's championship
- 1988–89 FA Cup
