= 1992 WFA Cup final =

1992 WFA Cup Final
- Event: 1991–92 WFA Cup
Doncaster Belles	Red Star Southampton
4	0
- Date: 25 April 1992
- Venue: Prenton Park, Birkenhead
- Referee: M. Scott (Tyne & Wear)

The 1992 WFA Cup Final was the 22nd final of the WFA Cup, England's primary cup competition for women's football teams. The showpiece event was played under the auspices of the Women's Football Association (WFA). Doncaster Belles and Red Star Southampton contested the match at the Prenton Park, the home stadium of Tranmere Rovers F.C. on 25 April 1992. Doncaster Belles ended up winning the game 4–0.

== Match details ==
25 April 1992
14:30 BST

Doncaster Belles	4–0	Red Star Southampton
Coultard 38'; Walker 47', 65', 78'	Report

Prenton Park, Birkenhead
Attendance: 250
Referee: M. Scott (Tyne & Wear)

GK	1	(England) Tracey Davidson
DF	2	(England) Julie Chipchase
DF	3	(England) Yvonne Bagley
MF	4	(England) Jackie Sherrard
DF	5	(England) Loraine Hunt
DF	6	(England) Michelle Jackson
MF	7	(England) Joanne Broadhurst
MF	8	(England) Gillian Coultard (c)
FW	9	(England) Karen Walker
FW	10	(England) Gail Borman
MF	11	(England) Janice Murray
Substitutes:
DF	12	(England) Lorraine Young
MF	13	(England) Sheila Edmunds
DF	14	(England) Claire Large
DF	15	(England) Suzanne Herring
Manager:
(England) Brian Broadhurst

GK	1	(England) Sue Buckett
DF	2	(England) Debra Ingram
DF	3	(Scotland) Pam Johnstone	(substituted off) 75'
DF	4	(England) Sharon Hayes
DF	5	(England) Louise Lee
MF	6	Jill England
MF	7	(England) Sarah Stanbury
MF	8	(England) Angela Fisher
FW	9	(Republic of Ireland) Geraldine Williams
FW	10	(England) Eileen Connolly (c)	(substituted off) 82'
MF	11	(England) Ali Kaile
Substitutes:
DF	12	(England) Vanessa Raynbird	(substituted on) 75'
DF	14	(England) Tammi Bowyer	(substituted on) 82'
DF	15	(England) Alison Oglesby
FW	16	(England) Pat Chapman
Player/Manager:
(England) Pat Chapman

Assistant referees:
P. Carden
R. S. Tucker

Match rules

- 90 minutes.
- 30 minutes of extra-time if necessary.
- Penalty shoot-out if scores still level.
- Five named substitutes.
- Maximum of two substitutions.
