= 1980–81 WFA Cup =

Tournament details
- Country: England & Wales

Final positions
- Champions: Southampton
- Runners-up: St Helens
- Penalty shoot-outs do not count towards the total number of goals.

The 1980–81 WFA Cup was an association football knockout tournament for women's teams, held between 5 October 1980 and 10 May 1981. It was the 11th season of the WFA Cup and was won by Southampton, who defeated St Helens in the final.

The tournament consisted seven rounds of competition proper.

All match results and dates from the Women's FA Cup Website.

== Group A ==
=== First round proper ===
All games were scheduled for 5 and 12 October 1980.

Tie	Home team (tier)	Score	Away team (tier)	Att.
1	Chard	1–3	Pelynt	
2	Exeter	1–2	Plymouth Pilgrims	
3	Exmouth	0–4	St Catherines	
4	Kingsteignton	H–W	Exeter Wanderers	
Walkover for Kingsteinton
5	Top Rank Bath	0–3	Illogan	
6	Torbay	1–7	Frome	
Bye: Tiverton, Uley

=== Second round proper ===
All games were originally scheduled for 2 November 1980.

Tie	Home team (tier)	Score	Away team (tier)	Att.
1	Illogan	1–2	Frome	
2	Kingsteignton	1–2	Pelynt	
3	St Catherines	3–0	Uley	
4	Tiverton	4–0	Plymouth Pilgrims	

=== Third round proper ===
All games were originally scheduled for 7 December 1980.

Tie	Home team (tier)	Score	Away team (tier)	Att.
1	St Catherines	3–1	Frome	
2	Tiverton	?–?	Pelynt	

== Group B ==
=== First round proper ===
All games were scheduled for 5 and 12 October 1980.

Tie	Home team (tier)	Score	Away team (tier)	Att.
1	Bournemouth	1–2	Worthing	
2	C&C Sports	1–0	Albion	
3	Durrington Rebels	0–9	Maidstone Mote United	
4	Gillingham	4–3	Herne Bay	
5	Kingston Grasshoppers	5–1	Courthope	
6	Molesey	8–0	Horam Rangers (Eastbourne)	
7	Reigate	1–7	Brighton	
8	Southampton	24–0	Hassocks Beacon	

=== Second round proper ===
All games were originally scheduled for 2 November 1980.

Tie	Home team (tier)	Score	Away team (tier)	Att.
1	Brighton	2–1	Molesey	
2	C&C Sports	4–0	Worthing	
3	Maidstone Mote United	17–0	Kingston Grasshoppers	
4	Southampton	12–0	Gillingham	

=== Third round proper ===
All games were originally scheduled for 7 December 1980.

Tie	Home team (tier)	Score	Away team (tier)	Att.
1	Maidstone Mote United	?–?	Brighton	
2	Southampton	?–?	C&C Sports	

== Group C ==
=== First round proper ===
All games were scheduled for 5 and 12 October 1980.

Tie	Home team (tier)	Score	Away team (tier)	Att.
1	Cope Chat	0–2	Aylesbury	
2	Hayes	2–5	Droitwich St. Andrews	
3	Launton	?–?	Avery Hill	
4	Newbury	?–?	Shoreline	
5	Newtown Worcester	1–12	Llanedeyrn	
6	Swindon Spitfires	4–1	Hampstead Heathens	
7	Warminster	8–2	West Ham United	
8	Worcester	2–0	Noel Trigg	

=== Second round proper ===
All games were originally scheduled for 2 November 1980.

Tie	Home team (tier)	Score	Away team (tier)	Att.
1	Aylesbury	3–0	Swindon Spitfires	
2	Launton	6–2	Droitwich St. Andrews	
3	Warminster	8–0	Llanedeyrn	
4	Worcester	2–9	Newbury	

=== Third round proper ===
All games were originally scheduled for 7 December 1980.

Tie	Home team (tier)	Score	Away team (tier)	Att.
1	Aylesbury	?–?	Warminster	
2	Newbury	?–?	Launton	
Winner not known

== Group D ==
=== First round proper ===
All games were scheduled for 5 and 12 October 1980.

Tie	Home team (tier)	Score	Away team (tier)	Att.
1	Biggleswade United	0–3	Lowestoft	
2	East Harling	2–12	Colchester	
3	Friends of Fulham	3–2	Stevenage	
4	Millwall Lionesses	17–0	Northwood	
5	Norwich	5–0	Suffolk Bluebirds	
6	Norwich Union	A–W	Willesden	
Norwich Union withdrew
7	Romford	9–2	Papworth	
8	Watford	H–W	Red Devils, Norwich	
Walkover for Watford

=== Second round proper ===
All games were originally scheduled for 2 November 1980.

Tie	Home team (tier)	Score	Away team (tier)	Att.
1	Millwall Lionesses	0–3	Lowestoft	
2	Romford	3–1	Friends of Fulham	
3	Watford	2–4	Colchester	
4	Willesden	8–1	Norwich	

=== Third round proper ===
All games were originally scheduled for 7 December 1980.

Tie	Home team (tier)	Score	Away team (tier)	Att.
1	Romford	?–?	Colchester	
2	Willesden	7–2	Lowestoft	

== Group E ==
=== First round proper ===
All games were scheduled for 5 and 12 October 1980.

Tie	Home team (tier)	Score	Away team (tier)	Att.
1	Birmingham City	3–4	EMGALS	
2	Coventry Bantams	3–3 (a.e.t.)	BYC Argyle (Burwell Youth Club)	
replay	BYC Argyle (Burwell Youth Club)	6–3 (a.e.t.)	Coventry Bantams	
3	Duston	0–24	Solihull	
4	Fishtoft	2–10	Crewe	
5	Leicester	2–3	Manchester United Supporters	
6	Luton Daytel	6–0	Burton Wanderers	
7	Town & County	?–? (a.e.t.)	Sportsco	
replay	Sportsco	?–?	Town & County	
8	Wolverhampton	3–2	Albion Wasps	

=== Second round proper ===
All games were originally scheduled for 2 November 1980.

Tie	Home team (tier)	Score	Away team (tier)	Att.
1	Crewe	8–3	Manchester United Supporters	
2	Solihull	1–0	BYC Argyle (Burwell Youth Club)	
3	Town & County	3–6	EMGALS	
4	Wolverhampton	10–0	Luton Daytel	

=== Third round proper ===
All games were originally scheduled for 7 December 1980.

Tie	Home team (tier)	Score	Away team (tier)	Att.
1	Solihull	?–?	EMGALS	
Winner not known
2	Wolverhampton	3–4	Crewe	

== Group F ==
=== First round proper ===
All games were scheduled for 5 and 12 October 1980.

Tie	Home team (tier)	Score	Away team (tier)	Att.
1	Daresbury	1–5	Preston North End	
2	Doncaster Belles	1–0	Manchester Corinthians	
3	Middlesbrough	1–1 (a.e.t.)	Rossendale	
replay	Rossendale	?–? (a.e.t.)	Middlesbrough	
replay	Middlesbrough	0–1 (a.e.t.)	Rossendale	
4	Notts Rangers	12–0	BP Sandbach	
5	Preston Rangers	3–4	Macclesfield	
6	Reckitts	1–4	Fodens	
7	Star Inn	1–3	Rotherham	
8	Wythenshawe	1–5	Prestatyn	

=== Second round proper ===
All games were originally scheduled for 2 November 1980.

Tie	Home team (tier)	Score	Away team (tier)	Att.
1	Doncaster Belles	4–0	Rotherham	
2	Fodens	4–2	Rossendale	
3	Macclesfield	3–1	Prestatyn	
4	Preston North End	2–1	Notts Rangers	

=== Third round proper ===
All games were originally scheduled for 7 December 1980.

Tie	Home team (tier)	Score	Away team (tier)	Att.
1	Macclesfield	?–?	Fodens	
2	Preston North End	0–0 (a.e.t.)	Doncaster Belles	
replay	Doncaster Belles	0–3	Preston North End	

== Group G ==
=== First round proper ===
All games were scheduled for 5 and 12 October 1980.

Tie	Home team (tier)	Score	Away team (tier)	Att.
1	Cleveland Spartans	15–0	Nabwood Athletic	
2	Kilnhurst	20–0	Preston Tigers	
3	Lostock Rangers	1–2	Ingol Belles	
4	Percy Main	4–0	Rowntree	
5	Prescot	4–0	Rochdale	
6	Stakepool	0–3	Broadoak	
7	Sunderland	1–12	Bronte	
8	Thornton ICI	0–10	St Helens	

=== Second round proper ===
All games were originally scheduled for 2 November 1980.

Tie	Home team (tier)	Score	Away team (tier)	Att.
1	Cleveland Spartans	12–1	Ingol Belles	
2	Kilnhurst	?–?	Bronte	
3	Percy Main	5–0	Prescot	
4	St Helens	5–0	Broadoak	

=== Third round proper ===
All games were originally scheduled for 7 December 1980.

Tie	Home team (tier)	Score	Away team (tier)	Att.
1	Percy Main	5–0	Bronte	
2	St Helens	?–?	Cleveland Spartans	

== Group H ==
=== First round proper ===
All games were scheduled for 5 and 12 October 1980.

Tie	Home team (tier)	Score	Away team (tier)	Att.
1	Amersham Angels	2–1	Ashford Town	
2	Arlesey YC	0–13	Spurs	
3	Bracknell	5–1	Thurrock	
4	Chelsea	3–0	Feltham United	
5	Dunstable	0–13	Shelburne	
6	Gallaher	6–1	Cove Krakatoa	
7	Hemel Hempstead	3–2	Milton Keynes	
8	Luton	23–0	Fulham	

=== Second round proper ===
All games were originally scheduled for 2 November 1980.

Tie	Home team (tier)	Score	Away team (tier)	Att.
1	Bracknell	6–2	Chelsea	
2	Gallaher	4–5	Amersham Angels	
3	Luton	6–2	Shelburne	
4	Spurs	2–0	Hemel Hempstead	

=== Third round proper ===
All games were originally scheduled for 7 December 1980.

Tie	Home team (tier)	Score	Away team (tier)	Att.
1	Bracknell	?–?	Luton	
Winner not known
2	Spurs	1–0	Amersham Angels	

== Fourth round proper ==
All games were originally scheduled for 4 January 1981.

Tie	Home team (tier)	Score	Away team (tier)	Att.
1	Bracknell OR Luton	?–?	St Helens	
2	Crewe	5–4	Warminster	
3	Maidstone Mote United	?–?	Spurs	
4	Newbury OR Launton	?–?	Preston North End	
5	Percy Main	?–?	Solihull OR EMGALS	
6	Southampton	7–1	Fodens	
7	St Catherines	?–?	Tiverton	
8	Willesden	4–0	Colchester	

== Quarter–finals ==
All games were played on 8 March 1981.

Tie	Home team (tier)	Score	Away team (tier)	Att.
1	Maidstone Mote United	2–1	Willesden	
2	Southampton	5–0	Percy Main	
3	St Catherines	2–4	Preston North End	
4	St Helens	8–1	Crewe	

== Semi–finals ==
All games were played on 5 April 1981.

Tie	Home team (tier)	Score	Away team (tier)	Att.
1	Maidstone Mote United	1–7	St Helens	
2	Southampton	3–0	Preston North End	

== Final ==
10 May 1981
14:30 BST

St Helens	2–4	Southampton
Leatherbarrow 26'; Turner 65'	Report	Chapman 12', 58'; England 45'; Carter 71'

Knowsley Road, St Helens
Attendance: 1,500
Referee: J.B. Worrall
