= 1986–87 WFA Cup =

Tournament details
- Country: England & Wales

Final positions
- Champions: Doncaster Belles
- Runners-up: St Helens
- Penalty shoot-outs do not count towards the total number of goals.

The 1986–87 WFA Cup was an association football knockout tournament for women's teams, held between 5 October 1986 and 3 May 1987. It was the 17th season of the WFA Cup and was won by Doncaster Belles, who defeated St Helens in the final.

The tournament consisted seven rounds of competition proper.

All match results and dates from the Women's FA Cup Website.

== Group A ==
=== First round proper ===
All games were scheduled for 5 October 1986.

Tie	Home team (tier)	Score	Away team (tier)	Att.
1	Abbeydale	3–1	Crewe	
2	Bennetts Bank	0–8	Preston Rangers	
3	Bilston United	0–3	City Bombers	
4	Droitwich St. Andrews	6–2	Worcester City	
5	Fodens	5–3	Spartax	
6	Solihull	1–1	BYC Argyle (Burwell Youth Club)	
replay	BYC Argyle (Burwell Youth Club)	?–?	Solihull	
7	Wyvern	0–2	Canley Social	
Bye: Birmingham City

=== Second round proper ===
All games were originally scheduled for 2 November 1986.

Tie	Home team (tier)	Score	Away team (tier)	Att.
1	Abbeydale	?–?	Canley Social	
2	Fodens	5–8 (a.e.t.)	Droitwich St. Andrews	
3	Preston Rangers	?–?	Bilston United	
4	Solihull	?–?	Birmingham City	

== Group B ==
=== First round proper ===
All games were scheduled for 5 October 1986.

Tie	Home team (tier)	Score	Away team (tier)	Att.
1	Aylesbury	H–W	Romford	
Romford withdrew
2	Islington	2–1	Vicarage Wanderers	
3	Milton Keynes	1–3	Hemel Hempstead	
4	Northwood	H–W	E Rangers	
E Rangers withdrew
5	Walton & Hersham	9–0	Gallaher	
Bye: Chelsea, Maidstone Mote United, Vixens

=== Second round proper ===
All games were originally scheduled for 2 November 1986.

Tie	Home team (tier)	Score	Away team (tier)	Att.
1	Chelsea	?–?	Vixens	
2	Maidstone Mote United	?–?	Islington	
3	Northwood	0–3	Hemel Hempstead	
4	Walton & Hersham	0–7	Aylesbury	

== Group C ==
=== First round proper ===
All games were scheduled for 5 October 1986.

Tie	Home team (tier)	Score	Away team (tier)	Att.
1	Attleborough	1–3	Launton	
2	Biggleswade	H–W	EMGALS	
EMGALS withdrew
3	Colchester	3–1	Suffolk Bluebirds	
4	Duston	2–4	Beccles	
5	Norwich	3–0	Leicester United	
6	Watford	2–4	Luton Daytel	
Bye: Dunstable, Ipswich

=== Second round proper ===
All games were originally scheduled for 2 November 1986.

Tie	Home team (tier)	Score	Away team (tier)	Att.
1	Beccles	?–?	Ipswich	
2	Biggleswade	?–?	Norwich	
3	Launton	?–?	Dunstable	
4	Luton Daytel	?–?	Colchester	

== Group D ==
=== First round proper ===
All games were scheduled for 5 October 1986.

Tie	Home team (tier)	Score	Away team (tier)	Att.
1	Bridge Youth Club	0–21	Exeter	
2	Cardiff	?–?	Keynsham	
3	Tongwynlais	1–1 (a.e.t.)	Cope Chat	
replay	Cope Chat	?–?	Tongwynlais	
4	Exeter Rangers	1–3	Pelynt	
5	Frome	2–2 (a.e.t.)	Ottery	
replay	Ottery	?–?	Frome	
6	Plymouth Pilgrims	2–2 (a.e.t.)	Truro City	
replay	Truro City	1–3	Plymouth Pilgrims	
Bye: Crewkerne, Taunton Trident

=== Second round proper ===
All games were originally scheduled for 2 November 1986.

Tie	Home team (tier)	Score	Away team (tier)	Att.
1	Exeter	?–?	Taunton Trident	
2	Frome	2–1	Cardiff	
3	Pelynt	?–?	Crewkerne	
4	Tongwynlais	3–1	Plymouth Pilgrims	

== Group E ==
=== First round proper ===
All games were scheduled for 5 October 1986.

Tie	Home team (tier)	Score	Away team (tier)	Att.
1	Haddon Park	1–3	Rainworth Miners Welfare	
2	Kilnhurst	5–2	Boots Athletic	
3	Loughborough	0–12	Beacon Wanderers	
4	Notts Rangers	4–0	Town & County	
5	Sheffield	H–W	Notts County	
Notts County withdrew
6	Spondon Leisure Centre	1–17	St Helens	
Bye: Doncaster Belles, Rotherham

=== Second round proper ===
All games were originally scheduled for 2 November 1986.

Tie	Home team (tier)	Score	Away team (tier)	Att.
1	Doncaster Belles	4–0	Rainworth Miners Welfare	
2	Kilnhurst	0–8	St Helens	
3	Notts Rangers	4–1	Rotherham	
4	Sheffield	3–2	Beacon Wanderers	

== Group F ==
=== First round proper ===
All games were scheduled for 5 October 1986.

Tie	Home team (tier)	Score	Away team (tier)	Att.
1	Cove Krakatoa	H–W	Southampton	
Southampton withdrew
2	Hightown	2–5	Bracknell	
3	Spurs	0–12	Solent	
4	Swindon Spitfires	0–1	Millwall Lionesses	
5	Tottenham	5–2	Bournemouth	
Bye: District Line, Newbury, Red Star Southampton

=== Second round proper ===
All games were originally scheduled for 2 November 1986.

Tie	Home team (tier)	Score	Away team (tier)	Att.
1	Cove Krakatoa	3–1	Tottenham	
2	Millwall Lionesses	8–0	District Line	
3	Newbury	?–?	Solent	
4	Red Star Southampton	?–?	Bracknell	

== Group G ==
=== First round proper ===
All games were scheduled for 5 October 1986.

Tie	Home team (tier)	Score	Away team (tier)	Att.
1	Broadoak	2–5	Boro Electronics	
2	Bronte	H–W	FC Redstar	
FC Redstar withdrew
3	Rowntrees	2–5	Leasowe	
4	Whitley Bay	4–2	Rossendale	
5	Wigan	1–1	Thornton ICI	
replay	Thornton ICI	3–4	Wigan	
Bye: Filey Flyers, Ingol Belles, Royds Hall

=== Second round proper ===
All games were originally scheduled for 2 November 1986.

Tie	Home team (tier)	Score	Away team (tier)	Att.
1	Filey Flyers	?–?	Royds Hall	
2	Ingol Belles	?–?	Boro Electronics	
3	Leasowe	?–?	Bronte	
4	Whitley Bay	8–2	Wigan	

== Group H ==
=== First round proper ===
All games were scheduled for 5 October 1986.

Tie	Home team (tier)	Score	Away team (tier)	Att.
1	C&C Sports	2–1	Horsham	
2	Friends of Fulham	32–0	Crawley	
3	Maidstone Tigresses	5–2	Hassocks Beacon	
4	Medway	0–6	Reigate	
5	Sussex University	A–W	Eastbourne	
Sussex University withdrew
Bye: Gillingham, Shoreham, Worthing

=== Second round proper ===
All games were originally scheduled for 2 November 1986.

Tie	Home team (tier)	Score	Away team (tier)	Att.
1	Eastbourne	?–?	Shoreham	
2	Maidstone Tigresses	0–5	Friends of Fulham	
3	Reigate	4–1	Gillingham	
4	Worthing	1–7	C&C Sports	

== Third round proper ==
All games were originally scheduled for 7 December 1986.

Tie	Home team (tier)	Score	Away team (tier)	Att.
1	Abbeydale	0–2	Doncaster Belles	
2	Boro Electronics	7–2	Pelynt	
3	C&C Sports	?–?	Chelsea	
4	Cove Krakatoa	?–?	Ipswich Town	
5	Filey Flyers	7–2	Frome	
6	Islington	?–?	Solihull	
7	Leasowe	2–1	Exeter	
8	Millwall Lionesses	8–0	Droitwich St. Andrews	
9	Notts Rangers	?–?	Luton Daytel	
10	Preston Rangers	4–0	Tongwynlais	
11	Red Star Southampton	2–3	Aylesbury	
12	Reigate	0–6	Friends of Fulham	
13	Sheffield	?–?	Shoreham	
14	Solent	?–?	Launton	
15	St Helens	2–0	Norwich	
16	Whitley Bay	4–2	Hemel Hempstead	

== Fourth round proper ==
All games were originally scheduled for 11, 18 and 25 January and 1 February 1987

Tie	Home team (tier)	Score	Away team (tier)	Att.
1	C&C Sports	?–?	Cove Krakatoa	
2	Doncaster Belles	4–1	Aylesbury	
3	Filey Flyers	2–3	Solihull	
4	Friends of Fulham	3–1	Preston Rangers	
5	Leasowe	?–?	Sheffield	
6	Notts Rangers	3–5	Millwall Lionesses	
7	Solent	1–4	St Helens	
8	Whitley Bay	2–3	Boro Electronics	

== Quarter–finals ==
All games were played on 1 and 8 February 1987.

Tie	Home team (tier)	Score	Away team (tier)	Att.
1	Boro Electronics	1–4	Doncaster Belles	
2	Leasowe	1–6	Friends of Fulham	
3	Solihull	1–2	Millwall Lionesses	
4	St Helens	4–2	C&C Sports	

== Semi–finals ==
All games were played on 8 and 22 March 1987.

Tie	Home team (tier)	Score	Away team (tier)	Att.
1	Doncaster Belles	2–0	Millwall Lionesses	
2	Friends of Fulham	0–1	St Helens	

== Final ==
3 May 1987
14:00

Doncaster Belles	2–0	St Helens
Sherrard 12'; Walker 80'	Report

City Ground, West Bridgford
Referee: Mark Scott (Nottingham)
