= 1997–98 FA Women's Cup =

Tournament details
- Country: England & Wales

Final positions
- Champions: Arsenal
- Runners-up: Croydon

The 1997–98 FA Women's Cup was an association football knockout tournament for women's teams, held between 28 September 1997 and 4 May 1998. It was the 28th season of the FA Women's Cup and was won by Arsenal, who defeated Croydon in the final.

The tournament consisted of eight rounds of competition proper.

All match results and dates from the Women's FA Cup website.

== First round proper ==
All games were scheduled for 28 September 1997.

Tie	Home team	Score	Away team	Att.
1	Basingstoke Town	4–2	Bristol City	
2	Bedford Bells	0–1 (a.e.t.)	Derby County	
3	Belper Town	3–5	Gorleston	
4	Birmingham City	5–3	Leicester City	
5	Blackburn Rovers	3–2	Chesterfield	
6	Cable–Tel (Newport)	1–3	Binfield	
7	Calverton MW	6–1	Mowbray Villa	
8	Camberley Town	0–6	Welwyn Garden City	
9	Cardiff County	15–1	Barnstaple Town	
10	Charlton	3–0	Hassocks	
11	Chelmsford City	3–0	Aylesbury Stocklake	
12	Chesham United	4–5	Hendon	
13	Chester City	3–2 (a.e.t.)	Trafford	
14	Chester Le Street Town	3–8	Leeds United	
15	Clacton	A–W	Mansfield Town	
Walkover for Mansfield Town
16	Clapton	2–0	Barnet	
17	Collier Row	1–2	Chelsea	
18	Darlington	6–0	Wrexham	
19	Doncaster Rovers	3–1	Wigan	
20	Droylsden	11–3	York City	
21	Dulwich Hamlet	6–1	Tesco Country Club	
22	Elmore Eagles	7–3	Worcester City	
23	Freeway	0–6	Swindon Town	
24	Gillingham	12–0	Stevenage Borough	
25	Hackney	9–1	Queens Park Rangers Ladies South	
26	Hampton	11–0	Great Wakering Rovers	
27	Harlow Town	3–7	Wembley Mill Hill	
28	Hemsworth Town	3–2	Mond Rangers	
29	Highfield Rangers	6–0	Cambridge United	
30	Hull City	0–4	Bangor City	
31	Ilkeston	3–6	Canary Racers	
32	Leeds City Vixens	4–1	Barnsley	
33	London Ladies	1–2 (a.e.t.)	Abbey Rangers	
34	London Women	4–0	Leatherhead	
35	Loughborough Students	3–1	Haverhill Rovers	
36	Luton	4–0	Sawbridgeworth Town	
Abandoned after 59 minutes as Sawbridgeworth Town withdrew due to player injury.

Tie	Home team	Score	Away team	Att.
37	Maidstone United	0–2	Fulham	
38	Milton Keynes Athletic	H–W	Cambridge City	
Walkover for Milton Keynes Athletic
39	Newcastle Town	4–0	Stockport County	
40	Newton Abbot	0–4	Swindon Spitfires	
41	Norton	2–2 (a.e.t.)	Scunthorpe Ironesses	
replay	Scunthorpe Ironesses	3–1	Norton	
42	Okeford United	H–W	Slough Town	
Walkover for Okeford United
43	Oldham Athletic	2–1	Middlesbrough	
44	Oxford United	14–0	Protel Super Strikers	
45	Portsmouth	5–1	Wokingham Town	
46	Preston North End	3–2	Manchester United	
47	Queens Park Rangers	2–1	Enfield	
48	Rea Valley Rovers	7–0	Pye	
49	Reading Royals	H–W	Thame United	
Walkover for Reading Royals
50	Redhill	2–8	Tottenham Hotspur	
51	Risborough Rangers	3–1	Clevedon United	
52	Rochdale	0–9	Liverpool Feds	
53	Selby Town	1–6	Newcastle	
54	Sheffield Hallam United	0–10	Stockport	
55	Sherborne	3–4 (a.e.t.)	Saltash Pilgrims	
56	Shrewsbury Town	3–1	Nettleham	
57	Southwold Town	3–4	Derby City	
58	St Georges (Eltham)	24–0	Egham Town	
59	Stanway	1–2	Surbiton	
60	Stockport Celtic	0–2	Haslingden	
61	Sunderland	2–3	Bury	
62	Teynham Gunners	4–2	Hastings Town	
63	Thorpe Tigers	0–6	Newsham Park Hospital	
64	Truro City	2–1	Exeter Rangers	
65	Walkern	1–5	Malling	
66	Warrington Grange	6–0	Kirklees	
67	Watford & Evergreen	9–0	Newham	
68	West Ham United	5–0	Redbridge Wanderers	

== Second round proper ==
All games were originally scheduled for 2 November 1997.

Tie	Home team	Score	Away team	Att.
1	Bangor City	1–2	Oldham Athletic	
2	Basingstoke Town	0–8	Reading Royals	
3	Binfield	1–0	Okeford United	
4	Blackburn Rovers	6–1	Haslingden	
5	Bloxwich Town	3–1	Shrewsbury Town	
6	Blyth Spartans Kestrels	6–3	Leeds United	
7	Brighton & Hove Albion	0–0 (a.e.t.)	Hampton	
replay	Hampton	1–2	Brighton & Hove Albion	
8	Bury	2–4	Liverpool Feds	
9	Calverton MW	0–1	Arnold Town	
10	Charlton	1–1 (a.e.t.)	Abbey Rangers	
replay	Abbey Rangers	0–2	Charlton	
11	Chester City	2–4	Huddersfield Town	
12	Clapton	0–4	Tottenham Hotspur	
13	Coventry City	2–1	Mansfield Town	
14	Derby City	1–5	Canary Racers	
15	Dulwich Hamlet	0–16	Wimbledon	
16	Elmore Eagles	0–7	Barry Town	
17	Fulham	7–1	Teynham Gunners	
18	Garswood Saints	6–1	Droylsden	
19	Gorleston	0–2	Birmingham City	
20	Hemsworth Town	1–5	Leeds City Vixens	
21	Hendon	5–5 (a.e.t.)	Hackney	
replay	Hackney	0–3	Hendon	
22	Ipswich Town	0–5	Ilkeston Town	
23	Langford	1–1 (a.e.t.)	Chelmsford City	
replay	Chelmsford City	0–4	Langford	

Tie	Home team	Score	Away team	Att.
24	London Women	1–2	Leyton Orient	
25	Loughborough Students	4–4 (a.e.t.)	Highfield Rangers	
replay	Highfield Rangers	2–1	Loughborough Students	
26	Luton	0–1	Queens Park Rangers	
27	Milton Keynes Athletic	1–6	Derby County	
28	Newcastle Town	2–1	Newcastle	
29	Preston North End	14–1	Darlington	
30	Rea Valley Rovers	0–8	Aston Villa	
31	Saltash Pilgrims	2–5	Portsmouth	
32	Scunthorpe Ironesses	1–4	Stockport	
33	Sheffield Wednesday	3–2	Doncaster Rovers	
34	Southampton Saints	3–1	Oxford United	
35	St Georges (Eltham)	1–1 (a.e.t.)	Surbiton	
replay	Surbiton	0–3	St Georges (Eltham)	
36	Swindon Town	0–2 (a.e.t.)	Cardiff County	
37	Three Bridges	4–2	Chelsea	
38	Truro City	2–2 (a.e.t.)	Swindon Spitfires	
replay	Swindon Spitfires	1–2	Truro City	
39	Warrington Grange	1–0	Newsham Park Hospital	
40	Watford & Evergreen	3–0	Malling	
41	Welwyn Garden City	1–10	Whitehawk	
42	Wembley Mill Hill	7–1	Gillingham	
43	West Ham United	3–1	Risborough Rangers	
44	Wolverhampton Wanderers	14–0	Rushden & Diamonds	

== Third round proper ==
All games were originally scheduled for 30 November and 7 and 14 December 1997.

Tie	Home team	Score	Away team	Att.
1	Aston Villa	1–0	Wolverhampton Wanderers	
2	Binfield	0–6	Southampton Saints	
3	Bloxwich Town	6–1	Highfield Rangers	
4	Blyth Spartans Kestrels	1–3 (a.e.t.)	Garswood Saints	
5	Brighton & Hove Albion	3–3 (a.e.t.)	Langford	
replay	Langford	2–3 (a.e.t.)	Brighton & Hove Albion	
6	Canary Racers	6–0	Arnold Town	
7	Cardiff County	3–0	Portsmouth	
8	Coventry City	4–4 (a.e.t.)	Birmingham City	
replay	Birmingham City	0–5	Coventry City	
9	Fulham	4–7 (a.e.t.)	Tottenham Hotspur	
10	Hendon	0–6	St Georges (Eltham)	
11	Huddersfield Town	4–2	Leeds City Vixens	

Tie	Home team	Score	Away team	Att.
12	Ilkeston Town	6–0	Derby County	
13	Leyton Orient	2–2 (a.e.t.)	Reading Royals	
replay	Reading Royals	1–0	Leyton Orient	
14	Liverpool Feds	1–5	Sheffield Wednesday	
15	Oldham Athletic	0–2	Preston North End	
16	Queens Park Rangers	3–4	Wimbledon	
17	Stockport	4–2	Blackburn Rovers	
18	Three Bridges	0–6	Watford & Evergreen	
19	Truro City	0–4	Barry Town	
20	Warrington Grange	3–5	Newcastle Town	
21	Wembley Mill Hill	1–4	Whitehawk	
22	West Ham United	0–7	Charlton	

== Fourth round proper ==
All games were originally scheduled for 11, 18 and 25 January and 1 February 1998.

11 January 1998	Bloxwich Town (2)	0–2	Ilkeston Town (2)
		Report	Kirk; Plinston

11 January 1998	Bradford City (1)	5–1	Aston Villa (2)
	Goal	Report	Goal

11 January 1998	Canary Racers (3)	0–12	Arsenal (1)	Attleborough
		Report	Spacey; Yankey; Williams; Mapes; Daly	Stadium: Attleborough Town FC; Attendance: 400; Referee: N. Warnes

11 January 1998	Cardiff County (3)	0–6	Millwall Lionesses (1)
		Report	Goal

11 January 1998	Charlton (3)	1–2	Stockport (3)	Eltham
	Goal	Report	Allwood; Maylett	Stadium: Charlton Athletic Training Ground; Referee: T W Stockill

11 January 1998	Doncaster Belles (1)	10–0	St Georges (Eltham) (3)
	Walker; Begg; Borman; Exley; Jackson (pen.)	Report

11 January 1998	Everton (1)	0–1	Liverpool (1)
		Report	Duffy 23'

11 January 1998	Reading Royals (3)	0–2	Barry Town (2)
		Report	Reilly 77'; Payne

11 January 1998	Southampton Saints (2)	2–1	Newcastle Town (3)
	Goal	Report	Goal

11 January 1998	Tottenham Hotspur (3)	2–1	Brighton & Hove Albion (2)
	Palmer 39'; Wiggen 90+1'	Report	Goal

11 January 1998	Tranmere Rovers (1)	4–2	Berkhamsted Town (1)	Heswall
	Shimin; Smith; Preston	Report	45'; 80'	Stadium: Gayton Park

11 January 1998	Whitehawk (2)	5–0	Coventry City (2)
	Goal	Report

18 January 1998	Garswood Saints (2)	4–1	Preston North End (3)
	Goal	Report	Goal

25 January 1998	Huddersfield Town (2)	3–2	Wimbledon (2)
	Wingate; Knight	Report	Goal

25 January 1998	Sheffield Wednesday (1)	3–2	Watford & Evergreen (3)
	Goal	Report	Goal

1 February 1998	Wembley (1)	0–10	Croydon (1)
		Report	Proctor; Britton; Bampton; Powell (pen.); Davis; Liran

== Fifth round proper ==
All games were played on 1 and 8 February 1998.

1 February 1998	Barry Town (2)	2–1	Stockport (3)
	Goal	Report	Goal

1 February 1998	Bradford City (1)	4–1	Sheffield Wednesday (2)
	Bailey; Davies; Moore; Garsdie	Report	Goal

1 February 1998	Doncaster Belles (1)	6–0	Huddersfield Town (2)
	Walker; Exley; Stevens	Report

1 February 1998	Liverpool (1)	2–0	Ilkeston Town (2)
	Goal	Report

1 February 1998	Millwall Lionesses (1)	2–0	Whitehawk (2)
	Goal	Report

1 February 1998	Southampton Saints (2)	0–1	Arsenal (1)	Totton
		Report	Spacey 20'	Stadium: Testwood Park

1 February 1998	Tranmere Rovers (1)	1–2	Garswood Saints (2)	Heswall
	Goal	Report	Goal	Stadium: Gayton Park

8 February 1998	Croydon (1)	4–1	Tottenham Hotspur (3)
	Britton; Davis	Report	Dixon

== Quarter-finals ==
All games were played on 1 March 1998.

1 March 1998	Croydon (1)	3–2	Bradford City (1)	Croydon
	Powell 22'; Broadhurst; Davis 51'	Report	Moore 9'; Haggerty-Crosse 90+3'	Stadium: Croydon Sports Arena

1 March 1998	Doncaster Belles (1)	1–2 (a.e.t.)	Arsenal (1)
	Jackson 90+1'	Report	Spacey 70'; White 103'

1 March 1998	Garswood Saints (2)	1–2 (a.e.t.)	Barry Town (2)
	Goal	Report	90'

1 March 1998	Millwall Lionesses (1)	2–2 (a.e.t.)	Liverpool (1)
	83'; 92'	Report	Formston 47'; Duffy

15 March 1998 Replay	Liverpool (1)	3–1	Millwall Lionesses (1)	Kirkby
	Oakford 13'; Hewitt 80'	Report	Lindsay 30'	Stadium: Kirkby Leisure Centre
Note: Millwall Lionesses were reinstated into the competition after Liverpool fielded an ineligible player.

== Semi-finals ==
Matches were played on the 29th March.

29 March 1998	Arsenal (1)	1–0	Millwall Lionesses (1)	Norbiton
	Yankey 78'	Report		Stadium: Kingsmeadow

29 March 1998	Barry Town (2)	0–1	Croydon (1)	Nailsworth
13:00 GMT		Report	Proctor 35'	Stadium: The Lawn Ground; Referee: K. Cartwright (Bristol)

== Final ==
4 May 1998
14:00 BST

Arsenal	3–2	Croydon
Spacey 17'; Yankey 52'; Few 90+2'	Report	Broadhurst 10' (pen.); Powell 55'

The New Den, London
Attendance: 2,205
Referee: Alan Wiley (Staffordshire)
