= 1989 WFA Cup final =

1989 WFA Cup Final
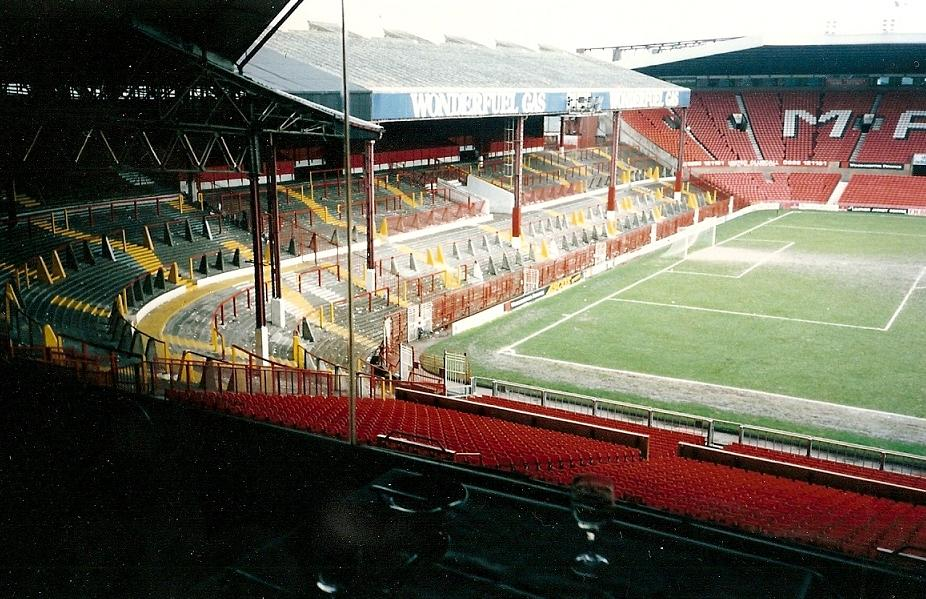
- The Stretford End at Old Trafford in 1992
- Event: 1988–89 WFA Cup
Friends of Fulham	Leasowe Pacific
2	3
- Date: 22 April 1989
- Venue: Old Trafford, Manchester
- Referee: Roger Dilkes (Mossley)
- Attendance: 914

The 1989 WFA Cup Final was the 19th final of the WFA Cup, England's primary cup competition for women's football teams. The showpiece event was played under the auspices of the Women's Football Association (WFA) and was known as the Niagara Therapy WFA Cup Final for sponsorship reasons. Friends of Fulham and Leasowe Pacific contested the match at Old Trafford in Manchester on 22 April 1989. Friends of Fulham made its second final appearance, after winning the trophy in 1985 with a 2–0 win over Doncaster Belles at Craven Cottage. Leasowe Pacific also entered their second final, in the sixth year of their existence, having been beaten 3–1 by the Belles in 1988.

England did not have a national women's league until 1991–1992. Friends of Fulham, who played in the Home Counties League, entered the competition at the third round stage and beat Oxford/County (8–1), Birmingham (3–2), Red Star Southampton (2–1) and Bronte (3–0) to reach the final. North West Women's League club Leasowe Pacific also entered at the third round and defeated Cardiff (9–0), Reigate (3–1), Doncaster Belles (2–1) and Notts Rangers (3–0) before reaching the final. The quarter final victory in Doncaster ensured that the final would not feature the Belles for the first time since 1982.

Before kick–off a minute's silence was observed for the victims of the Hillsborough disaster which happened the previous week in Sheffield. Friends of Fulham and the WFA expressed condolences to Leasowe Pacific, who came from the Merseyside community affected by the tragedy. Four members of the Leasowe team had been at Hillsborough. Leasowe had postponed their league match the following day and the final had been in doubt until the team decided to play.

Watched by a crowd of just 914, Leasowe Pacific won the match 3–2, with a winning goal from Joy "Barry" McQuiggan. Future England manager Hope Powell scored both Friends of Fulham goals. The following day at 5.30pm Channel 4 screened an hour–long highlights package, produced by Trans World International and presented by Julie Welch, which attracted an audience in excess of 2.5 million. Sue Law of Millwall Lionesses, later a senior official in The Football Association, was the match summariser.

"Undoubtedly a proportion of the 2.3 million who tuned in to Channel 4 to watch the WFA Cup last April did so with the expectation of having a quick laugh at women attempting to play football. Instead they were treated to a game as exciting and entertaining as you could hope to see. Leasowe Pacific beat Friends of Fulham 3–2 in a match full of incident, skill and endeavour, played by 22 female athletes at the top of their chosen sport. The sceptics were surely won over."

– WFA Secretary Linda Whitehead in October 1989

"In the aftermath of the Hillsborough disaster Merseyside's Leasowe Pacific's appearance in the final provided a useful and poignant angle for editorial coverage of the event."

== Match details ==
22 April 1989
14:00 BST

Friends of Fulham	2–3	Leasowe Pacific
Powell	Report	Murray; Thomas; McQuiggan

Old Trafford, Manchester
Attendance: 914
Referee: Roger Dilkes (Mossley)

Friends of Fulham	Leasowe Pacific

GK	1	(England) Theresa Wiseman (c)
DF	2	(England) Liz Waller
DF	3	(England) Mandy O'Callaghan
MF	4	(England) Hope Powell
DF	5	(England) Terri Springett
FW	6	(England) Marieanne Spacey
DF	7	(England) Dorrett Wilson
MF	8	(England) Brenda Sempare
MF	9	(England) Lynn Jacobs
MF	10	(England) Olivia Hughes
MF	11	(England) Fiona Curl
Substitutes:
FW	12	(Republic of Ireland) Cathy Hynes
DF	14	(England) Lori Hoey
DF	15	(England) Tracey Cooper
Manager:
(England) Fred Brockwell

GK	1	(England) Liz Stewart
DF	2	(England) Jill Thomas (c)
DF	3	(Wales) Jill Anson
MF	4	(England) Joy McQuiggan
DF	5	(Wales) Debbie Faulkner
DF	6	(England) Liz McDonald
MF	7	(England) Janice Murray
MF	8	(England) Cathy Gore
FW	9	(England) Maria Harper
FW	10	(Wales) Louise Thomas
MF	11	(England) Maureen Mallon
Substitutes:
MF	12	(Wales) Judith Turner
DF	13	(England) Dianne Coughlin
GK	14	(England) Donna Lewis
	15	(England) Jill Salisbury
	16	(England) Viv Cutbill
Manager:
(England) Billy Jackson

== Bibliography ==
- Lopez, Sue (1997). Women on the Ball: A Guide to Women's Football. London, England: Scarlet Press. ISBN 1857270169.
- Woodhouse, Donna; Williams, John (1999). Offside? The Position of Women in Football. Reading, England: Garnet Publishing. ISBN 1902932072.
