= 1979–80 WFA Cup =

Tournament details
- Country: England & Wales

Final positions
- Champions: St Helens
- Runners-up: Preston North End
- Penalty shoot-outs do not count towards the total number of goals.

The 1979–80 WFA Cup was an association football knockout tournament for women's teams, held between 28 October 1979 and 4 May 1980. It was the 10th season of the WFA Cup and was won by St Helens, who defeated Preston North End in the final.

The tournament consisted seven rounds of competition proper.

All match results and dates from the Women's FA Cup Website.

== Group A ==
=== First round proper ===
All games were scheduled for 28 October and 4 November 1979.

Tie	Home team (tier)	Score	Away team (tier)	Att.
1	Exeter	5–2	Kingsteignton	
2	Illogan	1–3	Tiverton	
3	Pelynt	6–3	Exmouth	
4	Torbay United	0–4	Plymouth Pilgrims	

=== Second round proper ===
All games were originally scheduled for 2 December 1979.

Tie	Home team (tier)	Score	Away team (tier)	Att.
1	Exeter	5–0	Pelynt	
2	Plymouth Pilgrims	0–0 (a.e.t.)	Tiverton	
replay	Tiverton	0–1	Plymouth Pilgrims	

=== Third round proper ===
All games were originally scheduled for 6 and 13 January 1980.

Tie	Home team (tier)	Score	Away team (tier)	Att.
1	Plymouth Pilgrims	3–2	Exeter	

== Group B ==
=== First round proper ===
All games were scheduled for 28 October and 4 November 1979.

Tie	Home team (tier)	Score	Away team (tier)	Att.
1	Barry	1–3	St Catherines	
2	Bath City	6–1	RNSTS Bath	
3	Noel Trigg	8–1	Chard	
4	Top Rank	0–8	Llanedeyrn	

=== Second round proper ===
All games were originally scheduled for 2 December 1979.

Tie	Home team (tier)	Score	Away team (tier)	Att.
1	Bath City	0–5	Llanedeyrn	
2	Noel Trigg	?–?	St Catherines	

=== Third round proper ===
All games were originally scheduled for 6 and 13 January 1980.

Tie	Home team (tier)	Score	Away team (tier)	Att.
1	Llanedeyrn	?–?	Noel Trigg	

== Group C ==
=== First round proper ===
All games were scheduled for 28 October and 4 November 1979.

Tie	Home team (tier)	Score	Away team (tier)	Att.
1	Chippenham	0–5	Warminster	
2	Newbury	0–5	Swindon Spitfires	
3	Red Star Southampton	2–1	Reading	
4	Southampton	H–W	Bracknell	
Walkover for Southampton

=== Second round proper ===
All games were originally scheduled for 2 December 1979.

Tie	Home team (tier)	Score	Away team (tier)	Att.
1	Swindon Spitfires	2–1	Red Star Southampton	
2	Warminster	0–2	Southampton	

=== Third round proper ===
All games were originally scheduled for 6 and 13 January 1980.

Tie	Home team (tier)	Score	Away team (tier)	Att.
1	Southampton	1–0	Swindon Spitfires	

== Group D ==
=== First round proper ===
All games were scheduled for 28 October and 4 November 1979.

Tie	Home team (tier)	Score	Away team (tier)	Att.
1	Havant	2–4	Willesden	
2	Morden	2–4	Cove Krakatoa	
3	Waterlooville	X–X	Hampton	
Both Waterlooville and Hampton disbanded and withdrew
4	Wittering	2–0	Fulham	

=== Second round proper ===
All games were originally scheduled for 2 December 1979.

Tie	Home team (tier)	Score	Away team (tier)	Att.
1	Littlehampton	3–2	Cove Krakatoa	
Bye: Willesden

=== Third round proper ===
All games were originally scheduled for 6 and 13 January 1980.

Tie	Home team (tier)	Score	Away team (tier)	Att.
1	Littlehampton	0–11	Willesden	

== Group E ==
=== First round proper ===
All games were scheduled for 28 October and 4 November 1979.

Tie	Home team (tier)	Score	Away team (tier)	Att.
1	Friends of Fulham	1–3	Molesey	
2	Marmion Centre	H–W	Kingston Grasshoppers	
Walkover for Marmion Centre
3	Reigate	2–1	Shoreline	
4	Worthing	0–10	Shoreham Orient	

=== Second round proper ===
All games were originally scheduled for 2 December 1979.

Tie	Home team (tier)	Score	Away team (tier)	Att.
1	Marmion Centre	5–2	Molesey	
2	Reigate	1–5	Shoreham Orient	

=== Third round proper ===
All games were originally scheduled for 6 and 13 January 1980.

Tie	Home team (tier)	Score	Away team (tier)	Att.
1	Marmion Centre	2–0	Shoreham Orient	

== Group F ==
=== First round proper ===
All games were scheduled for 28 October and 4 November 1979.

Tie	Home team (tier)	Score	Away team (tier)	Att.
1	Albion	H–W	Wealdstone	
Walkover for Albion
2	C&C Sports	3–2	Millwall Lionesses	
3	Chelsea	3–1	Shelburne	
4	Feltham United	1–0	Courthope	

=== Second round proper ===
All games were originally scheduled for 2 December 1979.

Tie	Home team (tier)	Score	Away team (tier)	Att.
1	Albion	1–5	Chelsea	
2	Feltham United	2–1	C&C Sports	

=== Third round proper ===
All games were originally scheduled for 6 and 13 January 1980.

Tie	Home team (tier)	Score	Away team (tier)	Att.
1	Chelsea	11–0	Feltham United	

== Group G ==
=== First round proper ===
All games were scheduled for 28 October and 4 November 1979.

Tie	Home team (tier)	Score	Away team (tier)	Att.
1	Ashford Town	H–W	Wouldham	
Walkover for Ashford
2	Diamond	3–5	Teynham Strykers	
3	Gillingham	8–1	Thanet Bluebirds	
4	Herne Bay	1–16	Maidstone	

=== Second round proper ===
All games were originally scheduled for 2 December 1979.

Tie	Home team (tier)	Score	Away team (tier)	Att.
1	Ashford Town	6–0	Teynham Strykers	
2	Maidstone	H–W	Gillingham	
Walkover for Maidstone

=== Third round proper ===
All games were originally scheduled for 6 and 13 January 1980.

Tie	Home team (tier)	Score	Away team (tier)	Att.
1	Ashford Town	0–6	Maidstone	

== Group H ==
=== First round proper ===
All games were scheduled for 28 October and 4 November 1979.

Tie	Home team (tier)	Score	Away team (tier)	Att.
1	Piersons United	1–11	Droitwich St. Andrews	
2	Solihull	6–0	Bedworth United	
3	Uley	4–2	Windsor Redditch	
4	Worcester	2–1	Cope Chat	

=== Second round proper ===
All games were originally scheduled for 2 December 1979.

Tie	Home team (tier)	Score	Away team (tier)	Att.
1	Droitwich St. Andrews	0–6	Solihull	
2	Uley	0–5	Worcester	

=== Third round proper ===
All games were originally scheduled for 6 and 13 January 1980.

Tie	Home team (tier)	Score	Away team (tier)	Att.
1	Worcester	0–5	Solihull	

== Group I ==
=== First round proper ===
All games were scheduled for 28 October and 4 November 1979.

Tie	Home team (tier)	Score	Away team (tier)	Att.
1	Bracknell Bullets	0–4	Amersham Angels	
2	Launton	28–0	Flackwell Heath	
3	Luton	1–10	Spurs	
4	Watford	1–6	Aylesbury Harlequins	

=== Second round proper ===
All games were originally scheduled for 2 December 1979.

Tie	Home team (tier)	Score	Away team (tier)	Att.
1	Amersham Angels	19–1	Launton	
2	Spurs	1–1 (a.e.t.)	Aylesbury Harlequins	
replay	Aylesbury Harlequins	2–0	Spurs	

=== Third round proper ===
All games were originally scheduled for 6 and 13 January 1980.

Tie	Home team (tier)	Score	Away team (tier)	Att.
1	Amersham Angels	4–4 (a.e.t.)	Aylesbury Harlequins	
replay	Aylesbury Harlequins	2–0	Amersham Angels	

== Group J ==
=== First round proper ===
All games were scheduled for 28 October and 4 November 1979.

Tie	Home team (tier)	Score	Away team (tier)	Att.
1	East Herts College	4–1	Hampstead Heathens	
2	Gallaher	2–7	Luton Daytel	
3	Highbury	3–1	Arlesey	
4	Stevenage	6–3	Northwood	

=== Second round proper ===
All games were originally scheduled for 2 December 1979.

Tie	Home team (tier)	Score	Away team (tier)	Att.
1	Luton Daytel	6–1	Highbury	
2	Stevenage	10–0	East Herts College	

=== Third round proper ===
All games were originally scheduled for 6 and 13 January 1980.

Tie	Home team (tier)	Score	Away team (tier)	Att.
1	Luton Daytel	4–1	Stevenage	

== Group K ==
=== First round proper ===
All games were scheduled for 28 October and 4 November 1979.

Tie	Home team (tier)	Score	Away team (tier)	Att.
1	Costessey	4–0	Thurrock	
2	Norwich	0–3	Lowestoft	
3	Romford	2–0	West Ham United	
4	Suffolk Bluebirds	3–10	Colchester Swifts	

=== Second round proper ===
All games were originally scheduled for 2 December 1979.

Tie	Home team (tier)	Score	Away team (tier)	Att.
1	Costessey	2–4	Colchester Swifts	
2	Romford	1–4	Lowestoft	

=== Third round proper ===
All games were originally scheduled for 6 and 13 January 1980.

Tie	Home team (tier)	Score	Away team (tier)	Att.
1	Colchester Swifts	1–7	Lowestoft	

== Group L ==
=== First round proper ===
All games were scheduled for 28 October and 4 November 1979.

Tie	Home team (tier)	Score	Away team (tier)	Att.
1	BYC Argyle (Burwell Youth Club)	5–1	Uttoxeter Eagles	
2	EMGALS	9–0	Burton Wanderers	
3	Leicester	4–5	Bedford Town (Biggleswade United)	
4	Town & County	0–10	Notts Rangers	

=== Second round proper ===
All games were originally scheduled for 2 December 1979.

Tie	Home team (tier)	Score	Away team (tier)	Att.
1	Bedford Town (Biggleswade United)	0–8	Notts Rangers	
2	BYC Argyle (Burwell Youth Club)	1–4	EMGALS	

=== Third round proper ===
All games were originally scheduled for 6 and 13 January 1980.

Tie	Home team (tier)	Score	Away team (tier)	Att.
1	Notts Rangers	1–0	EMGALS	

== Group M ==
=== First round proper ===
All games were scheduled for 28 October and 4 November 1979.

Tie	Home team (tier)	Score	Away team (tier)	Att.
1	Crewe	H–W	Point of Ayr	
Walkover for Crewe
2	Fodens	?–?	Macclesfield	
3	Prescot	0–4	St Helens	
4	Prestatyn	5–0	Murgatroyd's	

=== Second round proper ===
All games were originally scheduled for 2 December 1979.

Tie	Home team (tier)	Score	Away team (tier)	Att.
1	Crewe	6–8	Fodens	
2	St Helens	2–1	Prestatyn	

=== Third round proper ===
All games were originally scheduled for 6 and 13 January 1980.

Tie	Home team (tier)	Score	Away team (tier)	Att.
1	Fodens	0–10	St Helens	

== Group N ==
=== First round proper ===
All games were scheduled for 28 October and 4 November 1979.

Tie	Home team (tier)	Score	Away team (tier)	Att.
1	Cumberland Rangers	0–17	Preston North End	
2	Lostock Rangers	1–0	Ingol Belles	
3	Rossendale	15–0	Preston Tigers	
4	Thornton ICI	0–7	Preston Rangers	

=== Second round proper ===
All games were originally scheduled for 2 December 1979.

Tie	Home team (tier)	Score	Away team (tier)	Att.
1	Preston North End	5–2	Preston Rangers	
2	Rossendale	?–?	Lostock Rangers	

=== Third round proper ===
All games were originally scheduled for 6 and 13 January 1980.

Tie	Home team (tier)	Score	Away team (tier)	Att.
1	Preston North End	8–0	Rossendale	

== Group O ==
=== First round proper ===
All games were scheduled for 28 October and 4 November 1979.

Tie	Home team (tier)	Score	Away team (tier)	Att.
1	Bronte	4–0	Broadoak	
2	CP Doncaster	0–7	Doncaster Belles	
3	Kilnhurst	4–1	Rotherham	
4	Star Inn	4–2	Nabwood Athletic	

=== Second round proper ===
All games were originally scheduled for 2 December 1979.

Tie	Home team (tier)	Score	Away team (tier)	Att.
1	Doncaster Belles	4–2	Kilnhurst	
Doncaster fielded an unregistered player, match ordered to be replayed
replay	Kilnhurst	0–4	Doncaster Belles	
2	Star Inn	0–4	Bronte	

=== Third round proper ===
All games were originally scheduled for 6 and 13 January 1980.

Tie	Home team (tier)	Score	Away team (tier)	Att.
1	Bronte	3–6	Doncaster Belles	

== Group P ==
=== First round proper ===
All games were scheduled for 28 October and 4 November 1979.

Tie	Home team (tier)	Score	Away team (tier)	Att.
1	Cleveland Spartans	7–0	Rowntrees	
2	Hull Brewery	3–1	Sunderland	
3	Wallsend	11–1	Reckitts	
Bye: Cleveland Rangers

=== Second round proper ===
All games were originally scheduled for 2 December 1979.

Tie	Home team (tier)	Score	Away team (tier)	Att.
1	Cleveland Spartans	4–4 (a.e.t.)	Wallsend	
replay	Wallsend	1–6	Cleveland Spartans	
2	Hull Brewery	?–?	Cleveland Rangers	

=== Third round proper ===
All games were originally scheduled for 6 and 13 January 1980.

Tie	Home team (tier)	Score	Away team (tier)	Att.
1	Cleveland Spartans	9–1	Hull Brewery	

== Fourth round ==
All games were originally scheduled for 3 and 17 February 1980.

Tie	Home team (tier)	Score	Away team (tier)	Att.
1	Chelsea	2–1	Solihull	
2	Lowestoft	?–?	Maidstone	
3	Luton Daytel	3–1	Noel Trigg	
4	Marmion Centre	0–6	Southampton	
5	Notts Rangers	2–1	Doncaster Belles	
6	Plymouth Pilgrims	2–4	Cleveland Spartans	
7	Preston North End	3–2	Aylesbury Harlequins	
8	St Helens	5–1	Willesden	

== Fifth round ==
All games were played on 24 February 1980.

Tie	Home team (tier)	Score	Away team (tier)	Att.
1	Cleveland Spartans	5–0	Chelsea	
2	Lowestoft	1–2	Preston North End	
3	Notts Rangers	0–7	St Helens	
4	Southampton	8–2	Luton Daytel	

== Semi–finals ==
All games were played on 23 March 1980.

Tie	Home team (tier)	Score	Away team (tier)	Att.
1	Preston North End	1–0	Cleveland Spartans	
2	St Helens	2–1	Southampton	

== Third place playoff ==
Match played on the 4th May 1980

Tie	Home team (tier)	Score	Away team (tier)	Att.
1	Southampton	2–1	Cleveland Spartans	

== Final ==
4 May 1980
15:30 BST

St Helens	1–0	Preston North End
Holland 75'	Report

Southbury Road, Enfield
Referee: Ron Challis
