= 1984–85 WFA Cup =

Tournament details
- Country: England & Wales

Final positions
- Champions: Friends of Fulham
- Runners-up: Doncaster Belles
- Penalty shoot-outs do not count towards the total number of goals.

The 1984–85 WFA Cup was an association football knockout tournament for women's teams, held between 7 October 1984 and 12 May 1985. It was the 15th season of the WFA Cup and was won by Friends of Fulham, who defeated Doncaster Belles in the final.

The tournament consisted seven rounds of competition proper.

All match results and dates from the Women's FA Cup Website.

== Group A ==
=== First round proper ===
All games were scheduled for 7 October 1984.

Tie	Home team (tier)	Score	Away team (tier)	Att.
1	Bournemouth	6–0	Exeter Rangers	
2	Cardiff	H–W	Cope Chat	
Walkover for Cardiff
3	Chard	1–4	Southampton	
4	Exeter	1–2	C&C Southwick	
5	Exmouth	0–3	Pelynt	
6	Keynsham	4–2	Frome	
7	Tiverton	0–2	Illogan	
8	TV Pilgrims	0–3	Red Star Southampton	

=== Second round proper ===
All games were originally scheduled for 4 and 11 November 1984.

Tie	Home team (tier)	Score	Away team (tier)	Att.
1	Bournemouth	0–5	Illogan	
2	C&C Southwick	1–1 (a.e.t.)	Red Star Southampton	
replay	Red Star Southampton	?–?	C&C Southwick	
3	Keynsham	2–1	Pelynt	
4	Southampton	9–0	Cardiff	

=== Third round proper ===
All games were originally scheduled for 2, 9 and 16 December 1984.

Tie	Home team (tier)	Score	Away team (tier)	Att.
1	Keynsham	?–?	C&C Southwick	
2	Southampton	1–0	Illogan	

== Group B ==
=== First round proper ===
All games were scheduled for 7 October 1984.

Tie	Home team (tier)	Score	Away team (tier)	Att.
1	Ashford Town	1–0	Hassocks Beacon	
2	Howbury Grange	A–W	Horsham	
Walkover for Horsham
3	Northfleet	0–11	Eastbourne	
4	Reigate	3–0	Gillingham	
Bye: Croydon, Herne Bay, Shoreham, Worthing

=== Second round proper ===
All games were originally scheduled for 4 and 11 November 1984.

Tie	Home team (tier)	Score	Away team (tier)	Att.
1	Ashford Town	2–0	Worthing	
2	Eastbourne	3–5	Shoreham	
3	Horsham	3–1	Herne Bay	
4	Reigate	3–0	Croydon	

=== Third round proper ===
All games were originally scheduled for 2, 9 and 16 December 1984.

Tie	Home team (tier)	Score	Away team (tier)	Att.
1	Ashford Town	?–? (a.e.t.)	Horsham	
replay	Horsham	1–1 (2–4 p)	Ashford Town	
2	Reigate	6–1	Shoreham	

== Group C ==
=== First round proper ===
All games were scheduled for 7 October 1984.

Tie	Home team (tier)	Score	Away team (tier)	Att.
1	Bracknell	6–2	Spurs	
2	Gallaher	4–2	Romford	
3	Vicarage Wanderers	1–24	Molesey	
4	Wokingham	0–11	Solent	
Bye: Aylesbury, Chelsea, East Herts College, West Ham United

=== Second round proper ===
All games were originally scheduled for 4 and 11 November 1984.

Tie	Home team (tier)	Score	Away team (tier)	Att.
1	Bracknell	2–3	Aylesbury	
2	Chelsea	2–1	Gallaher	
3	East Herts College	0–8	Solent	
4	West Ham United	A–W	Molesey	
Walkover for Molesey

=== Third round proper ===
All games were originally scheduled for 2, 9 and 16 December 1984.

Tie	Home team (tier)	Score	Away team (tier)	Att.
1	Chelsea	5–4	Molesey	
2	Solent	?–?	Aylesbury	

== Group D ==
=== First round proper ===
All games were scheduled for 7 October 1984.

Tie	Home team (tier)	Score	Away team (tier)	Att.
1	Hayes	0–3	Chingford	
2	Hightown	4–1	Tottenham	
3	Moorhill	A–W	Millwall Lionesses	
Walkover for Millwall Lionesses
4	Swindon Spitfires	3–3 (a.e.t.)	District Line	
replay	District Line	2–2 (3–4 p)	Swindon Spitfires	
Bye: Friends of Fulham, Newbury, Northwood, Watford

=== Second round proper ===
All games were originally scheduled for 4 and 11 November 1984.

Tie	Home team (tier)	Score	Away team (tier)	Att.
1	Millwall Lionesses	8–0	Chingford	
2	Newbury	1–0	Hightown	
3	Northwood	1–3	Watford	
4	Swindon Spitfires	0–9	Friends of Fulham	

=== Third round proper ===
All games were originally scheduled for 2, 9 and 16 December 1984.

Tie	Home team (tier)	Score	Away team (tier)	Att.
1	Friends of Fulham	4–1	Millwall Lionesses	
2	Newbury	4–1	Watford	

== Group E ==
=== First round proper ===
All games were scheduled for 7 October 1984.

Tie	Home team (tier)	Score	Away team (tier)	Att.
1	Boots Athletic	1–5	Luton Daytel	
2	Gloucester	0–6	Milton Keynes	
3	Leicester	0–18	Biggleswade United	
4	Norwich	4–1	Birmingham City	
5	Notts Forest	0–9	Suffolk Bluebirds	
6	Wolverhampton	0–9	Canley Athletic	
7	Worcester	2–4	Hemel Hempstead	
Bye: Notts Rangers

=== Second round proper ===
All games were originally scheduled for 4 and 11 November 1984.

Tie	Home team (tier)	Score	Away team (tier)	Att.
1	Hemel Hempstead	7–1	Canley Athletic	
2	Luton	1–7	Norwich	
3	Milton Keynes	1–0	Biggleswade United	
4	Suffolk Bluebirds	2–1	Notts Rangers	

=== Third round proper ===
All games were originally scheduled for 2, 9 and 16 December 1984.

Tie	Home team (tier)	Score	Away team (tier)	Att.
1	Milton Keynes	0–1	Hemel Hempstead	
2	Suffolk Bluebirds	1–4	Norwich	

== Group F ==
=== First round proper ===
All games were scheduled for 7 October 1984.

Tie	Home team (tier)	Score	Away team (tier)	Att.
1	Burton Wanderers	0–8	Town & County	
2	BYC Argyle (Burwell Youth Club)	11–1	Uttoxeter Eagles	
3	Chesterfield	2–3	EMGALS	
4	Costessey	2–1	Colchester	
5	Droitwich St. Andrews	3–3 (a.e.t.)	Haddon Park	
replay	Haddon Park	2–3	Droitwich St. Andrews	
6	Duston Two Tones	H–W	Pye	
Walkover for Dustin Two Tones
7	Notts County	2–5	Solihull	
Bye: Bilston United

=== Second round proper ===
All games were originally scheduled for 4 and 11 November 1984.

Tie	Home team (tier)	Score	Away team (tier)	Att.
1	Bilston United	1–2	BYC Argyle (Burwell Youth Club)	
2	Duston Two Tones	0–4	Town & County	
3	EMGALS	5–6	Droitwich St. Andrews	
4	Solihull	W–O	Costessey	
Walkover for Solihull

=== Third round proper ===
All games were originally scheduled for 2, 9 and 16 December 1984.

Tie	Home team (tier)	Score	Away team (tier)	Att.
1	BYC Argyle (Burwell Youth Club)	1–2	Town & County	
2	Droitwich St. Andrews	5–2	Solihull	

== Group G ==
=== First round proper ===
All games were scheduled for 7 October 1984.

Tie	Home team (tier)	Score	Away team (tier)	Att.
1	Chorley	0–9	Crewe	
2	CP Doncaster	1–4	Rowntrees	
3	Leasowe	8–0	Macclesfield	
4	Nabwood Athletic	1–2	North Shields	
5	Rotherham	1–0	Middlesbrough	
6	Sheffield	5–0	Deeside	
Bye: Bronte, Darlington

=== Second round proper ===
All games were originally scheduled for 4 and 11 November 1984.

Tie	Home team (tier)	Score	Away team (tier)	Att.
1	Leasowe	12–0	Darlington	
2	North Shields	1–3	Crewe	
3	Rowntrees	1–6	Broadoak	
4	St Helens	?–?	Bronte	

=== Third round proper ===
All games were originally scheduled for 2, 9 and 16 December 1984.

Tie	Home team (tier)	Score	Away team (tier)	Att.
1	Broadoak	5–1	Leasowe	
2	Crewe	3–2	St Helens	

== Group H ==
=== First round proper ===
All games were scheduled for 7 October 1984.

Tie	Home team (tier)	Score	Away team (tier)	Att.
1	Cleveland Spartans	0–1	Kirkby Sports Centre	
2	Doncaster Belles	34–0	Leek Leaders	
3	Fodens	3–1	Bolton Bodiceans	
4	Ingol Belles	4–3	Rossendale	
5	Manchester United	1–10	Broadoak	
6	St Helens	3–1	Preston Rangers	
Bye: Daresbury, Kilnhurst

=== Second round proper ===
All games were originally scheduled for 4 and 11 November 1984.

Tie	Home team (tier)	Score	Away team (tier)	Att.
1	Doncaster Belles	H–W	Daresbury	
Walkover for Doncaster Belles
2	Fodens	2–5 (a.e.t.)	Rotherham	
3	Ingol Belles	2–5	Kilnhurst	
4	Sheffield	1–3	Kirkby Sports Centre	

=== Third round proper ===
All games were originally scheduled for 2, 9 and 16 December 1984.

Tie	Home team (tier)	Score	Away team (tier)	Att.
1	Doncaster Belles	2–0	Kilnhurst	
2	Kirkby Sports Centre	2–0	Rotherham	

== Fourth round proper ==
All games were originally scheduled for 6, 13, 27 January and 3 February 1985.

Tie	Home team (tier)	Score	Away team (tier)	Att.
1	Droitwich St. Andrews	0–9	Broadoak	
2	Chelsea	4–0 (a.e.t.)	Ashford Town	
3	Doncaster Belles	5–2	C&C Southwick	
4	Kirkby Sports Centre	1–1 (a.e.t.)	Newbury	
replay	Newbury	2–1	Kirkby Sports Centre	
5	Crewe	?–? (a.e.t.)	Norwich	
replay	Norwich	1–1 (?–? p)	Crewe	
6	Reigate	0–1 (a.e.t.)	Aylesbury	
7	Southampton	0–3	Friends of Fulham	
8	Town & County	4–3	Hemel Hempstead	

== Quarter–finals ==
All games were played on 10 and 24 February 1985.

Tie	Home team (tier)	Score	Away team (tier)	Att.
1	Aylesbury	2–2 (1–3 p)	Norwich	
2	Chelsea	0–2	Town & County	
3	Doncaster Belles	3–0	Broadoak	
4	Newbury	0–4	Friends of Fulham	

== Semi–finals ==
All games were played on 10 March 1985.

Tie	Home team (tier)	Score	Away team (tier)	Att.
1	Norwich	0–5	Doncaster Belles	
2	Town & County	0–5	Friends of Fulham	

== Final ==
12 May 1985
14:30 BST

Friends of Fulham	2–0	Doncaster Belles
McAdam 22'; Hynes 25'	Report

Craven Cottage, Fulham
Attendance: 925
Referee: Darryl Reeves (Uxbridge)
