= 1980 WFA Cup final =

1980 WFA Cup Final
- Event: 1979–80 WFA Cup
St Helens	Preston North End
1	0
- Date: 4 May 1980
- Venue: Southbury Road, Enfield
- Referee: Ron Challis

The 1980 WFA Cup Final was the 10th final of the FA Women's Cup, England's primary cup competition for women's football teams. It was the tenth final to be held under the direct control of Women's Football Association (WFA). St Helens and Preston North End contested the match at Southbury Road, the former home stadium of Enfield F.C. on 4 May 1980. The game ended 1–0 to St Helens.

== Match details ==
4 May 1980
15:30 BST

St Helens	1–0	Preston North End
Holland 75'	Report

Southbury Road, Enfield
Referee: Ron Challis

GK	1	(England) Ann Harkins
DF	2	(England) Nora Critchley
DF	3	(England) Jill Anson
DF	4	(England) Kris Smith
DF	5	(England) Anne Hayde
MF	6	(England) Sue Holland
MF	7	(England) Joan Amos (c)
MF	8	(England) Mary Killeen
MF	9	(England) Alison Leatherbarrow
FW	10	(England) Judith Turner
FW	11	(England) Janet Turner
Substitutes:
FW	12	(England) Janet Long
GK	13	(England) Shirley Thompson
Manager:
(England) Chris Slater

GK	1	(England) Sally Pilkington
DF	2	(England) Linda Tottey
DF	3	(England) Di Murrell
DF	4	(England) Jo Harwood
DF	5	(England) Michelle Haylet
MF	6	(England) Karen Masheter (c)
MF	7	(England) Shirley Harrison
MF	8	(England) Cathy Brindle
MF	9	(England) Sheila Parker
FW	10	(England) Lynn Arstal
FW	11	(England) Wendy Lee
Substitutes:
FW	12	(England) Clare Loman
DF	13	(England) Viv Hartley
MF	14	(England) Julie D'Acre
GK	15	(England) Lynne Tyrer
DF	16	(England) Sue Ackroyd
Manager:
(England) Keith Aspinall
