= 1983 WFA Cup final =

1983 WFA Cup Final
- Event: 1982–83 WFA Cup
Doncaster Belles	St Helens
3	2
- Date: 8 May 1983
- Venue: Sincil Bank, Lincoln
- Player of the Match: Sheila Stocks (Doncaster Belles)
- Referee: Arnold Challinor (Rotherham)
- Attendance: 1,500

The 1983 WFA Cup Final was the 13th final of the WFA Cup, England's primary cup competition for women's football teams. The showpiece event was played under the auspices of the Women's Football Association (WFA). Doncaster Belles and St Helens contested the match at Sincil Bank, the home stadium of Lincoln City. The Doncaster Belles won 3–2 to lift the Cup for the first time.

== Match details ==
8 May 1983
14:30 BST

Doncaster Belles	3–2	St Helens
Stocks; J. Hanson	Report	Leatherbarrow; Deighan

Sincil Bank, Lincoln
Attendance: 1,500
Referee: Arnold Challinor (Rotherham)

Doncaster Belles	St Helens

GK	1	(England) Tracey Davidson
DF	2	(England) Doreen Jones
DF	3	(England) Wendy Hardisty
DF	4	(England) Donna Young
DF	5	(England) Jackie Sherrard
MF	6	(England) Toni Youd
MF	7	(England) Jill Hanson
MF	8	(England) Sheila Stocks (c)
FW	9	(England) Lorraine Hanson
FW	10	(England) Carol Carr
MF	11	(England) Tracy Hunt
Substitutes:
MF	12	(England) Julie Sutcliffe
MF	13	(England) Denise Pittock
Manager:
(England) Richard Hanson

GK	1	(England) Ann Harkins (c)
DF	2	(England) Denise Hampson
DF	3	(England) Norah Critchley
DF	4	(England) Sheila Parker
DF	5	(England) Sue Holland
MF	6	(Wales) Yvonne Gagen
MF	7	(England) Liz Deighan
MF	8	(England) Alison Leatherbarrow
MF	9	(England) Judith Turner
FW	10	(England) Janet Turner
FW	11	(England) Karen Cummings
Substitutes:
DF	12	(England) Cathryn Malone
DF	13	(England) Kath Bilsbury
Manager:
(England) Chris Slater
