= 1987 WFA Cup final =

1987 WFA Cup Final
- Event: 1986–87 WFA Cup
Doncaster Belles	St Helens
2	0
- Date: 3 May 1987
- Venue: City Ground, West Bridgford
- Referee: Mark Scott (Nottingham)

The 1987 WFA Cup Final was the 17th final of the WFA Cup, England's primary cup competition for women's football teams. The showpiece event was played under the auspices of the Women's Football Association (WFA). Doncaster Belles and St Helens contested the match at the City Ground, the home stadium of Nottingham Forest. Doncaster Belles up winning the game 2–0.

== Match details ==
3 May 1987
14:00

Doncaster Belles	2–0	St Helens
Sherrard 12'; Walker 80'	Report

City Ground, West Bridgford
Referee: Mark Scott (Nottingham)

GK	1	(England) Tracey Davidson
DF	2	(England) Doreen Jones
DF	3	(England) Louise Ryde
DF	4	(England) Loraine Hunt
DF	5	(England) Jackie Sherrard
MF	6	(England) Gillian Coultard
MF	7	(England) Jill Hanson
MF	8	(England) Sheila Stocks (c)
FW	9	(England) Lorraine Hanson
FW	10	(England) Karen Walker
MF	11	(England) Karen Skillcorn
Substitutes:
FW	12	(England) Carol Carr
DF	13	(England) Lorraine Young
FW	14	(England) Dawn Wood
MF	15	(England) Samantha Eyre
Manager:
(England) Mick Sherrard

GK	1	(Wales) Sandra Moore
DF	2	(England) Norah Critchley
DF	3	(Wales) Jill Anson	Substituted off
DF	4	(England) Chris Slater
DF	5	(England) Ann Harkins
MF	6	(England) Jackie Whittick
MF	7	(England) Janet Turner
MF	8	(England) Liz Deighan (c)
FW	9	(England) (Wales) Alison Leatherbarrow
FW	10	(England) Lorraine Burke
MF	11	(Wales) Judith Turner
Substitutes:
DF	12	(England) Sue King
DF	13	(England) Karen Cummings
MF	14	(Wales) Chris Coyle	Substituted on
Manager:
(England) Keith Mayer
