= Janet Turner (footballer) =

English footballer

Personal information
- Full name: Janet Mayer
- Birth name: Janet Turner
- Position: Midfielder

Senior career*
Years	Team	Apps	(Gls)
1976–1983	St Helens		
1983–1984	Crewe Alexandra		
- St Helens

International career
1979–1986	England	28	(4)
- * Club domestic league appearances and goals

Janet Mayer née Turner is a former footballer who played as a winger for the England national team, winning 28 caps. During her club career she won the 1980 WFA Cup final with St Helens.

== Club career ==
Turner's greatest achievement was winning the Women's FA Cup in 1980 with St Helens. They beat Preston North End 1–0 in the final at Southbury Road in Enfield, with her twin sister Judith also in the starting line-up. In total the twins played four WFA finals together, winning in 1980, and finishing as runners up in 1981, 1983 and 1987. The 1980–81 season started well with Turner scoring twice on the opening day of the season against Hull. She scored with a header from a corner in the 1981 WFA Cup final loss to Southampton at Knowsley Road, and in 1983, St Helens lost 3–2 in the final to Doncaster Belles at Sincil Bank, home ground of Lincoln City. Along with her sister, Turner was described as part of the "twins on the wing" in the WFA newsletter for their attacking play during the match. In 1987, St Helens lost for a third time in the final when Doncaster Belles beat them 2–0 at the City Ground in Nottingham. This marked the last appearance for Turner in a WFA Cup final.

== International career ==
Turner made her England debut against Finland in 1979. She played in Portopia'81, a tournament held in Japan, against Japan and Denmark, marking the first ever visit by an England national football team to the country. Coming on as a second half substitute, Turner was also part of the England squad that competed at the 1984 European Competition where England lost 1–0 in the final to Sweden.

In November 2022, Turner was recognized by The Football Association as one of the England national team's legacy players, and as the 44th women's player to be capped by England.

== Honours ==
St Helens

- Women's FA Cup: 1979–80

England

- UEFA Women's Championship runner-up: 1984
