= 1981 WFA Cup final =

1981 WFA Cup Final
- Event: 1980–81 WFA Cup
| St Helens | Southampton |
| 2 | 4 |
- Date: 10 May 1981
- Venue: Knowsley Road, St Helens
- Referee: J.B. Worrall
- Attendance: 1,500

The 1981 WFA Cup Final was the 11th final of the FA Women's Cup, England's primary cup competition for women's football teams. It was the eleventh final to be held under the direct control of Women's Football Association (WFA). St Helens and Southampton Women's F.C. contested the match at Knowsley Road, the former home stadium of St Helens on 10 May 1981. The game ended 4–2 to Southampton

== Match details ==
10 May 1981
14:30 BST

| St Helens | 2–4 | Southampton |
|---|---|---|
| Leatherbarrow 26'; Turner 65' | Report | Chapman 12', 58'; England 45'; Carter 71' |

Knowsley Road, St Helens
Attendance: 1,500
Referee: J.B. Worrall

| GK | 1 | (Republic of Ireland) Ann Harkins |
| DF | 2 | (England) Kath Bilsbury |
| DF | 3 | (England) Jill Anson |
| DF | 4 | (Wales) Norah Critchley (c) |
| DF | 5 | (England) Anne Hayde |
| MF | 6 | (England) Mary Killeen |
| MF | 7 | (Wales) Joan Amos |
| MF | 8 | (England) Liz Deighan |
| MF | 9 | (England) Alison Leatherbarrow |
| FW | 10 | (England) Judith Turner | Substituted off |
| FW | 11 | (England) Janet Turner |
Substitutes:
| FW | 12 | (England) Janet Long | Substituted on |
| GK | 13 | (England) Shirley Thompson |
Manager:
(England) Chris Slater

| GK | 1 | (England) Sue Buckett (c) |
| DF | 2 | (England) Marliyn Baker |
| DF | 3 | (England) Heather Kirkland |
| DF | 4 | (Scotland) Ann Squires |
| DF | 5 | (England) Linda Coffin |
| MF | 6 | Jill England |
| MF | 7 | (England) Vanessa Raynbird |
| MF | 8 | (England) Pat Chapman |
| MF | 9 | (England) Sharon Roberts |
| FW | 10 | (England) Sue Lopez |
| FW | 11 | (England) Hilary Carter |
Substitutes:
| FW | 12 | (England) Stephney Harris |
| DF | 13 | (England) Jackie Richards |
Manager:
(England) Tony Old
