= 1974 WFA Cup final =

1974 WFA Cup Final
- Event: 1973–74 WFA Cup
Southampton	Fodens
1	2
- Date: 28 April 1974
- Venue: The Eyrie, Bedford
- Referee: D.G. Martin
- Attendance: 800

The 1974 WFA Cup Final was the fourth final of the FA Women's Cup, England's primary cup competition for women's football teams. It was the fourth final to be held under the direct control of Women's Football Association (WFA). Southampton and Fodens contested the match at the Eyrie, the former home of Bedford Town on 28 April 1974. Fodens won the match 2–1.

== Match details ==
28 April 1974
15:30 BST

Southampton	1–2	Fodens
Davies	Report	Leatherbarrow

The Eyrie, Bedford
Attendance: 800
Referee: D.G. Martin

GK	1	(England) Sue Buckett (c)
DF	2	(England) Beverley Gain
DF	3	(England) Pauline Dickie
DF	4	(England) Linda Coffin
DF	5	(England) Jill Long
MF	6	(England) Maggie Pearce
MF	7	(England) Lynda Hale
MF	8	(England) Sue Lopez
MF	9	(England) Pat Davies
FW	10	(England) Pat Chapman
FW	11	(England) Shirley O'Callaghan
Substitutes:
FW	12	(England) Ann Rice
GK	13	(England) Grace Cesareo
Manager:
(England) Noel Coffin

GK	1	(England) Hazel Bancroft
DF	2	(England) Elaine Brown
DF	3	(England) Sue Carter
DF	4	(England) Sue Shenton
DF	5	(England) Sheila Parker (c)
MF	6	(England) Carol Aikin
MF	7	(England) Alison Leatherbarrow
MF	8	(England) Sylvia Gore
MF	9	(England) Pat Firth
FW	10	(England) Jeannie Allott
FW	11	(England) Lesley Caldwell
Substitutes:
FW	12	(England) Jill Jodrill
	13	(England) Paula McDevitt
Manager:
(England) Eric Aldersay
