= Liz Deighan =

English footballer

Personal information
- Full name: Elizabeth Deighan
- Date of birth: 17 August 1953 (age 73)
- Place of birth: Northumberland, England
- Position: Midfielder

International career
Years	Team	Apps	(Gls)
1974-1985	England	49	(3)

Liz Deighan (born c. 1953, Northumberland) is a former association football player, who played for the England national women's football team, as well as clubs including Fodens WFC, Southport WFC, and St Helens W.F.C. She won 49 England caps, making her debut against France on 7 November 1974.

== Career ==
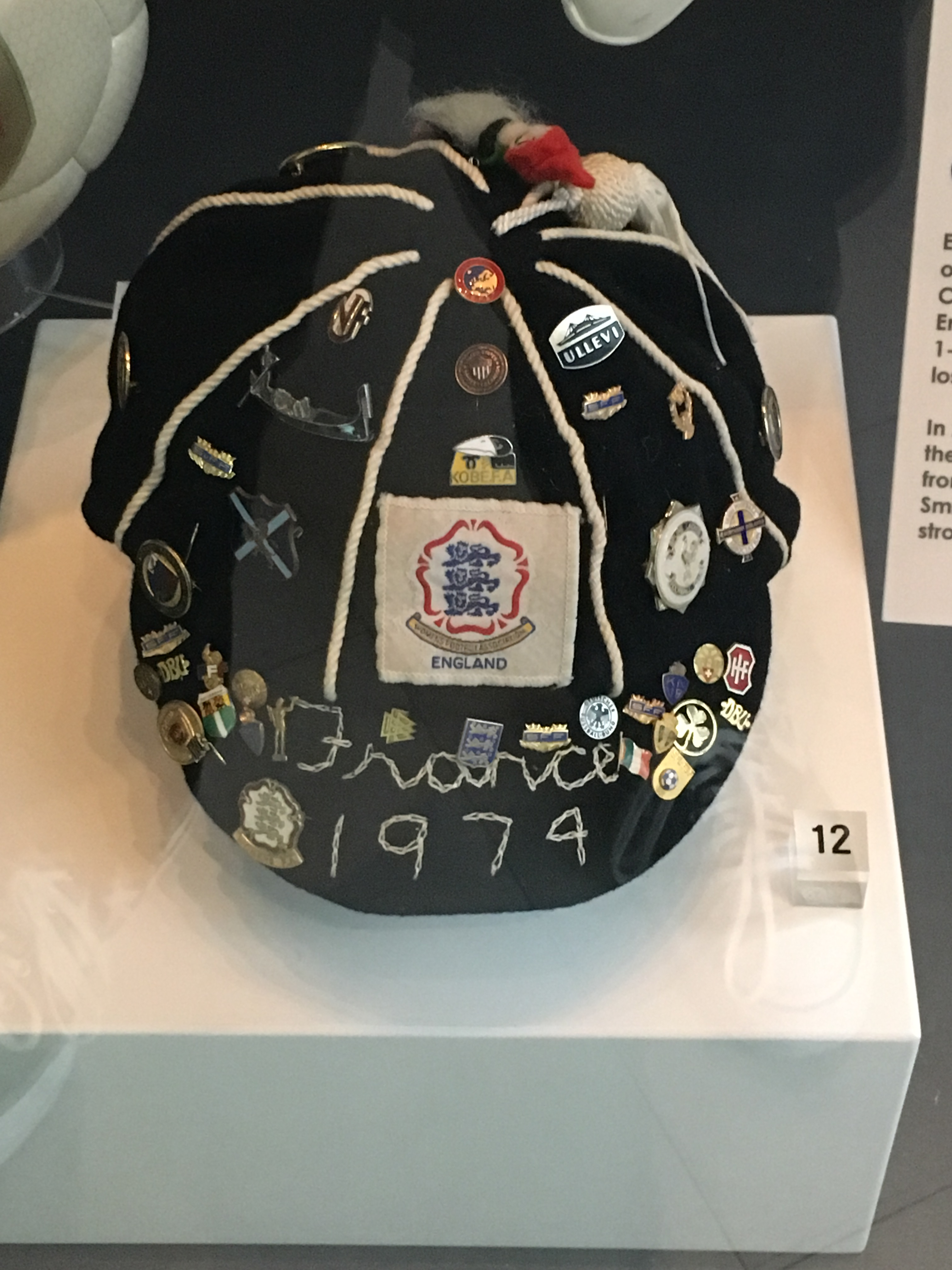
Deighan's first England cap

Although often deployed in attack early in her career, Deighan made a name for herself as a midfielder.

She scored in the semi-final of the 1984 European Competition for Women's Football, in which England reached the final before losing to Sweden on penalties. Her final cap came in the Mundialito in September 1985.

Domestically she won the Women's FA Cup in the 1979–80 season with St Helens, and reached three other finals as runner-up with the club during the 1980s. St Helens were beaten in the 1981 WFA Cup final by Southampton and in the 1983 and 1987 finals by Doncaster Belles.

Upon retirement from the game she trained as a coach, including a spell in charge of England's Under-21 ladies. In 1989 Deighan founded and managed Newton Ladies FC, the team who would eventually become Liverpool F.C. Women.

She was allotted 21 when the FA announced their legacy numbers scheme to honour the 50th anniversary of England's inaugural international.
