= Alison Leatherbarrow =

English footballer

Senior career*
Years	Team	Apps	(Gls)
- Fodens Ladies F.C.
- Prestatyn
- St Helens

International career
1975–1979	England	19	(0)
- * Club domestic league appearances and goals

Alison Leatherbarrow is a former England women's international footballer. She represented the England women's national football team at senior international level and spent most of her career at Fodens Ladies F.C. and St Helens, where she won the Women's FA Cup with both clubs.

== Club career ==
Her first WFA Cup final win came in 1974 when Fodens beat Southampton 2–1 in Bedford with Leatherbarrow scoring both of Fodens goals. Her second title came in 1980 with St Helens when they beat Preston North End 1–0 at Southbury Park, Enfield. Leatherbarrow became the first women to score for two different clubs in WFA Cup finals in 1981 when she scored for St Helens against Southampton at Knowsley Road, adding to her brace for Fodens in 1974. In addition to her victories in 1974 and 1980, Leatherbarrow also finished runner up in the competition in 1981, 1983 and 1987 whilst playing for St Helens. Leatherbarrow missed a penalty in the 1987 final which was saved by Tracey Davidson of Doncaster Belles. In between playing for Fodens and St Helens, Leatherbarrow played for Prestatyn.

== International career ==
In November 2022, Leatherbarrow was recognized by The Football Association as one of the England national team's legacy players, and as the 25th women's player to be capped by England. In total she won 19 caps for England. She later played international football for Wales.

== Later life ==
After retirement from work, Leatherbarrow moved to live in Brittany, France.

== Honours ==
Fodens Ladies F.C.

- FA Women's Cup: 1973–74

St Helens

- FA Women's Cup: 1979–80
