= Ripaults Factory =

Art deco factory building in England

Coordinates: 51.64948°N 0.0532°W

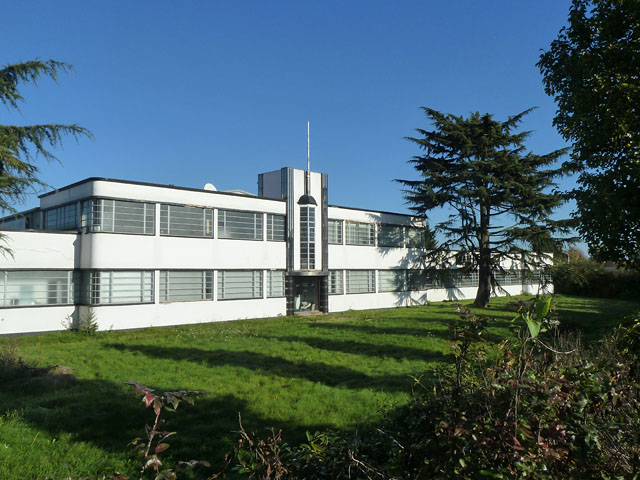
The former Ripaults Factory.

The Ripaults Factory is a grade II listed art deco factory building in Southbury Road, in the London Borough of Enfield.

== History ==
The factory was constructed around 1930 or 1936 to a design by A.H. Durnford for the Ripaults firm who made automotive electrical cables and components. The firm were still located there in 1973. The building was later used by truck makers MAN and in 2015 was taken over by builder's merchants Travis Perkins.
