= North West Women's League =

The North West Women's League (NWWL) was a women's football league, representing the top level of play in North West England.

The league was founded in 1970 and originally consisted of eight teams, including Fodens Ladies F.C. Later teams in the division included St Helens W.F.C., Chorley L.F.C., Crewe L.F.C., F.C. Redstar, Leasowe Pacific and Preston Rangers W.F.C.

In 1989, the league merged with the Greater Manchester and Merseyside League, and with the Three Counties League, to form the North West Women's Regional Football League.
