= Vanessa Raynbird =

English footballer

Personal information
- Date of birth: 28 November 1953 (age 72)
- Place of birth: Basingstoke, England

Senior career*
Years	Team	Apps	(Gls)
- Southampton Women's F.C.
- * Club domestic league appearances and goals

Vanessa Raynbird is a former footballer for Southampton Women's F.C. Raynbird's greatest achievement was the winning the 1981 WFA Cup Final. Since retiring she has coached Portsmouth FC. Raynbird currently works as the director of football for the Hampshire FA.

== Honours ==
Southampton

- FA Women's Cup: 1980–81
