= Tracy Davidson (footballer) =

English footballer

Personal information
- Full name: Tracy Davidson
- Date of birth: 6 January 1961 (age 65)
- Place of birth: Grantham, England
- Position: Goalkeeper

Senior career*
Years	Team	Apps	(Gls)
- Notts County
1982–1994	Doncaster Belles		
1994–1995	Liverpool Ladies		

International career
1987–1994	England	25	(0)
- * Club domestic league appearances and goals

Tracy Davidson (born 6 January 1961) is an English former international football goalkeeper. She represented the England women's national football team at senior international level and spent more than a decade with Doncaster Belles during their dominance of English women's football.

== Early life ==
She attended Gedling School.

== Club career ==
In 1983, Davidson played for Doncaster Belles in their first ever WFA Cup final, a 3–2 win over St Helens at Sincil Bank. In the 1987 WFA Cup final she saved a penalty from Alison Leatherbarrow of St Helens. Doncaster Belles went on to win 2-0 at the City Ground. She remained the South Yorkshire club's regular goalkeeper in the 1994 FA Women's Cup Final win over Knowsley United, representing a period of unprecedented success which saw Doncaster Belles reach 11 out of 12 Cup finals, winning six of them. Davidson, known as Davo to teammates, also collected doubles in 1992 and 1994.

In the summer of 1994, Davidson, who worked in Merseyside as an accountant, joined Belles teammates Janice Murray and Louise Ryde in signing for newly–formed Liverpool Ladies. In 1994–95 she played the Cup final again, as Liverpool lost 3–2 to Arsenal. Marieanne Spacey scored the winning goal in the 81st minute. Liverpool also reached the 1996 final but 15-year–old schoolgirl Rachel Brown had taken over in goal, following Davidson's sudden retirement in summer 1995.

== International career ==
Manager Martin Reagan handed Davidson her senior England debut in 1987, in a 1–0 victory in the Republic of Ireland, a friendly match played ahead of the 1987 European Competition for Women's Football in Norway. She spent a period as understudy to regular number one Theresa Wiseman before enjoying a spell as the first choice number one.

When The Football Association (FA) took over running the national team in 1993, incoming manager Ted Copeland selected Lesley Higgs for the 1995 UEFA Women's Championship qualifiers, with Davidson as back–up. In the final group match, a 10–0 win over Slovenia at Griffin Park, Davidson came on as a second-half substitute for Higgs. Davidson enjoyed a five-year international career whilst seeing out her playing days at Liverpool. Pauline Cope was called–up as a replacement and went on to become first choice for the 1995 FIFA Women's World Cup and beyond.

She has England legacy number 71. The FA announced their legacy numbers scheme to honour the 50th anniversary of England’s inaugural international.
