= Sheila Stocks =

English footballer

Personal information
- Full name: Sheila Edmunds
- Birth name: Sheila Stocks
- Position: Defender

Senior career*
Years	Team	Apps	(Gls)
1969-1994	Doncaster Rovers Belles		
- * Club domestic league appearances and goals

Sheila Edmunds (née Stocks) is a former Doncaster Rovers Belles player. Sheila Stocks is the founder of Doncaster Rovers Belles. Sheila Stocks played for Doncaster Rovers Belles for 25 years and retired in 1994.

== Personal life ==
Sheila Stocks later married Paul Edmunds who was the Doncaster Belles coach.

== Honours ==
Doncaster Belles

- FA Women's Cup: 1982–83, 1986-87, 1987–88, 1989–90, 1991–92, 1993–94

== Bibliography ==
- Davies, Pete (1996). I Lost My Heart To The Belles. Mandarin. ISBN 0-7493-2085-0.
