= Janice Murray (footballer) =

English footballer

Jan Murray
Personal information
- Full name: Janice Murray
- Date of birth: 26 October 1966 (age 60)
- Place of birth: Birkenhead, England
- Position: Winger

Senior career*
Years	Team	Apps	(Gls)
- Leasowe Pacific
–1994	Doncaster Belles		
1994–	Liverpool Ladies		

International career^{‡}
1989–1994	England	35	(1)
- * Club domestic league appearances and goals as of 19:53, 10 December 2024 (UTC) ‡ National team caps and goals as of 19:53, 24 November 2011 (UTC)

Janice Murray (born 26 October 1966) is an English former international footballer. She played as a left winger for clubs including Leasowe Pacific, Doncaster Belles and Liverpool Ladies. Murray won thirty-five caps for the senior England women's national football team.

== Club career ==
Murray acquired the nickname Psycho. During a match on her native Merseyside, she scored a free kick in a manner which a spectator likened to Zico. The comment, made in scouse, was misheard as Psycho and the name remained with Murray throughout her career. In April 1993 football journalist Henry Winter wrote in The Independent that Murray was "nicknamed 'Psycho' but the possessor of skills more Finney than Vinnie."

She helped Leasowe Pacific win the 1989 WFA Cup against Friends of Fulham at Old Trafford. It was second time lucky for Murray and Leasowe having been defeated 3-1 by Doncaster Belles in the 1988 final. After transferring to Doncaster Belles she then won two doubles with Doncaster Belles in 1992 and 1994. Murray returned to Merseyside with newly formed Liverpool Ladies in 1994. She was part of the Liverpool team that lost the 1995 FA Women's Cup final to Arsenal at Prenton Park.

== International career ==
In 1989 Murray played for England in a 2–0 home friendly defeat by Sweden. The match was held at Wembley Stadium to mark the 20th anniversary of the Women's Football Association (WFA) and was played as a curtain raiser to the male national team's Rous Cup game against Chile.

When The Football Association (FA) took over running the national team in 1993, Murray started the first game that September, a 10–0 win over Slovenia in Ljubljana. Manager Ted Copeland selected Murray in the next three 1995 UEFA Women's Championship qualifiers, before she retired from international duty along with club teammate Tracey Davidson. Davidson remarked that: "The management leave a lot to be desired, and if you don't enjoy it, what's the point?"

Murray's subsequent absence from England's 1995 FIFA Women's World Cup squad was controversial. Doncaster Belles manager Paul Edmunds described it as a disaster for the team: "It's such a shame she's not going to Sweden. She'd go down the line, she'd pop in the cross, Kaz'd score on the end of it – she'd solve his [Copeland's] left-side problem in one go. But he's put her off, hasn't he? Disaster, that."

She was allotted 77 when the FA announced their legacy numbers scheme to honour the 50th anniversary of England's inaugural international.
