= Southbury Road =

Road in Enfield, London

Coordinates: 51.652°N 0.0635°W

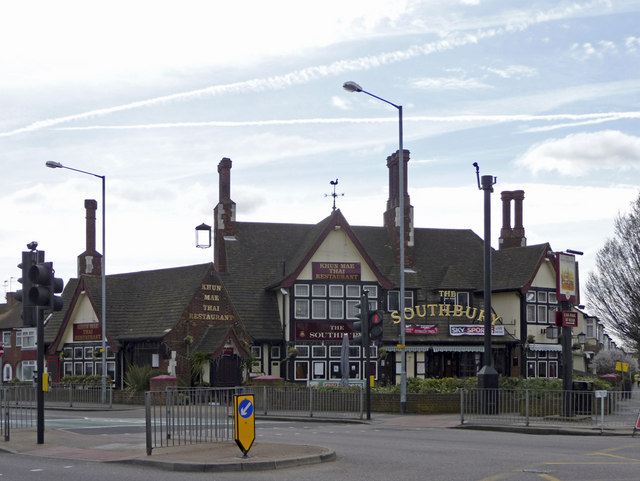
The Southbury public house.

Southbury Road is a road in Enfield, north London, that runs from Enfield Town in the west to Nags Head Road in the east. It is part of the A110 road.

== Buildings ==
The grade II listed former Ripaults Factory is located in the road.

Southbury Road football stadium once stood in the road and was the home of Enfield FC from 1936 until it was sold in 1999 for housing and retail development forcing Enfield FC into a ground share at Borehamwood.
