= Judith Turner =

American photographer (born 1939)

- Born: April 10, 1939; New York City, U.S.
- Education: Boston University, School of Fine Arts (BFA, 1961)
- Occupation: Photographer
- Known for: Architectural photography; abstract black-and-white and color photography
- Notable work: Judith Turner: Photographs Five Architects (1980); Between Spaces (2000); Judith Turner: Seeing Ambiguity (2012)
- Movement: Architectural photography; fine art photography
- Awards: Honor Award, American Institute of Architects (1994); Stars of Design Award in Photography (2007)

Judith Turner is an American photographer known for her abstract black-and-white images of modern and contemporary architecture.

== Career ==
=== Early life and education ===
Turner received a Bachelor of Fine Arts degree in graphic design from the School of Fine Arts at Boston University in 1961. Her formal training was in visual design rather than photography, a background that would later strongly influence her photographic practice. After graduation, she worked professionally as a graphic designer in New York City, including designing book jackets.

=== Photographic career ===
Turner began taking photographs in 1972 while living in New York. Although her early work was not limited to architecture, her focus shifted decisively after she encountered architect Peter Eisenman in the mid-1970s. Through Eisenman, Turner was introduced to a circle of avant-garde architects, and architecture became the primary subject matter of her work.

In the mid-1970s, Turner photographed renovations at The Cooper Union in Cornwall, Connecticut (1976). In 1980, Turner published her first monograph, Judith Turner: Photographs Five Architects.

== Recognition and legacy ==
Turner has held solo exhibitions in cities across the United States, Europe, South America, Israel, and Japan, and her work has appeared in numerous group exhibitions. Her work was the subject of a major exhibition at the University of Michigan Museum of Art in 2012.

She has received multiple grants and fellowships, including an Honor Award from the American Institute of Architects in 1994 and a Stars of Design Award in Photography from the Design Center of New York in 2007.

Her photographs are held in major institutional collections, including the International Center of Photography, the Brooklyn Museum, the George Eastman Museum, the San Francisco Museum of Modern Art, the Library of Congress, the Art Institute of Chicago, the Canadian Centre for Architecture, the Bibliothèque nationale de France, the Royal Institute of British Architects, and the Tokyo Metropolitan Museum of Photography.

== Publications ==
- Judith Turner Photographs: Five Architects. London: Academy Editions; New York: Rizzoli International Publications, 1980. ISBN 978-0-85670-735-3
- White City: International Style Architecture in Israel. Tel Aviv: Tel Aviv Museum, 1984.
- Annotations on Ambiguity. Tokyo: Axis Design Publications, 1986. ISBN 978-0-8478-0823-6
- Parables & Pieces. New York: Vincent FitzGerald & Co., 1990.
- After: Etchings by Judith Turner. New York: Vincent FitzGerald & Co., 1993.
- Near Sitings: Photographs 1975–1995. Oklahoma City: City Arts Center, 1995.
- Between Spaces: Smith-Miller + Hawkinson Architecture. New York: Princeton Architectural Press, 2000. ISBN 978-1-56898-227-4
- Alvar Aalto: Through the Eyes of Shigeru Ban. London: Black Dog Publishing Ltd., 2007. ISBN 978-1-904772-64-4
- Seeing Ambiguity: Photographs of Architecture. Stuttgart & London: Edition Axel Menges, 2012. ISBN 978-3-936681-50-5
- Zaha Hadid, Judith Turner: A Dialogue. Stuttgart & London: Edition Axel Menges, 2015. ISBN 978-3-936681-91-8
