= Swindon Spitfires F.C. =

Swindon Spitfires
- Full name: Swindon Spitfires Football Club
- Nickname(s): Spits
- Founded: 1967; 58 years ago
- Ground: Watchfield Sports Pavilion, Vale of White Horse
- President: Chris Maull
- Chairperson: Diane George
- League: South West Regional Women's League Division 1 East
Home colours

Swindon Spitfires Football Club is an English football club from Swindon, Wiltshire. The women's first team are members of the South West Regional Women's Football League Division One East, train at New College, Swindon and play their home matches in nearby Watchfield, Vale of White Horse. Founded in 1967, they are one of the oldest extant women's and girls' football clubs in England. The club also runs a reserve team and several age-group teams in its youth system. In 2011 the club launched an associated men's team, who compete in the local Swindon & District League.

== History ==
=== Early years ===
In 1967 the club was formed by female Swindon Town supporters, who had been in the club's marching band but decided that they wanted to play football. When they watched Swindon Town playing at Watford, they were invited to the chairman's lounge at Vicarage Road. It was the Watford chairman who suggested that they call themselves Swindon Spitfires, in honour of their home town's links to the iconic Supermarine Spitfire aircraft. (Note: In 1940 Spitfire production switched to Swindon after the factory in Southampton was bombed by the Luftwaffe.)

Ron Hyde, whose daughter was a player, served as the team's first manager. The team debuted in June 1967, losing 10–5 to Calne. Two goals from Jo Swinden and a Sylvia Carson hat-trick completed the Spitfires' scoring. Another Carson hat-trick and one from club captain Dee Allison secured a 6–6 draw with Calne in the rematch. The Spitfires secured their first win in their ninth match, when they beat Cheltenham 4–1.

The team then enjoyed sustained local success, often attracting three to four hundred supporters to home matches staged at the W.D. & H.O. Wills factory sports grounds in Swindon. In May 1969 they beat Emgals of Leicester 2–1 at Bedworth Oval to win the first Midland Ladies Football League Cystic Fibrosis Cup. A controversial 5–0 win over Newbury Golden Eagles in September 1969 saw one player from each team shown the red card for trading punches. In June 1970 Swindon Spitfires were one of the 44 clubs to be represented at the Women's Football Association's (WFA) inaugural annual general meeting at Caxton Hall. They affiliated to the Home Counties League, which also contained Southampton WFC, the dominant team of the era. (Note: There was no national women's football league in England until 1991.)

Nuneaton Wanderers beat the Spitfires 5–2 in the Heart of England Open Cup final in May 1971 at Cheltenham. In 1973–74 Swindon Spitfires reached the semi-final of the national FA Women's Cup (then known as the Mitre Challenge Trophy). In the quarter-final the Spitfires beat Brighton GPO 1–0. They lost the semi-final 2–0 to eventual Cup winners Foden's. In the third place play-off, staged as a curtain raiser to the final at Bedford Town, Swindon Spitfires faced a Westthorn United team containing Rose Reilly and Edna Neillis.

=== Split ===
During the 1992–93 season, Swindon Spitfires had been in protracted negotiations with Swindon Town over a merger with the men's English Football League club. The Spitfires' first team manager Kerri Garwood unexpectedly made a unilateral agreement with Swindon Town to form their new women's team, taking most of the Spitfires' squad with her. This left Swindon Spitfires with only five players. Although they managed to attract new players and survive, a degree of enmity remained and developed into a longstanding rivalry between the clubs.

=== Later years ===
In 1995–96 Swindon Spitfires won the Southern Region Women's Football League. They were defeated by Tottenham Hotspur in a play-off for promotion to the FA Women's Premier League Southern Division.

A runners-up position in the 2014–15 South West Regional Women's Football League Premier Division secured promotion to the FA Women's Premier League Division One South West. During the subsequent 2015–16 FA Women's Premier League season the club withdrew from the league after a series of heavy defeats, planning to regroup at a lower level.

In their 50th anniversary year the club won the Wiltshire League and were admitted to an enlarged South West Regional Women's Football League for 2017–18. In September 2018 New College, Swindon officially opened a new artificial turf pitch, with Swindon Spitfires among the listed partner clubs permitted to train at the facility. Also that month the club agreed a sponsorship deal with Swindon-based magician Mark Burford.

== The Maulls ==
Chris Maull helped Ron Hyde to found Swindon Spitfires and after a period of absence returned to the club in 1974. In 1976 he married Bev Maull (née Thompson), who had joined the club as a player in 1970 after a successful trial. The couple became "instrumental" in fulfilling a series of different roles at the club over the following decades. They attended Wembley Stadium in August 2015 after being nominated for a national Football Association (FA) award and were praised by Geoff Hurst, who described their dedication as: "absolutely astonishing". In 2015–16 Bev remained an active player at the club despite celebrating her 60th birthday during the season. She intended to take up walking football from 2016–17. Chris Maull died in April 2022.
