= Southampton Saints Girls & Ladies F.C. =

Southampton Saints Girls and Ladies Football Club
- Full name: Southampton Saints Girls and Ladies Football Club
- Nickname: The Saints
- Founded: 1979; 47 years ago (as Red Star Southampton W.F.C.)
- Dissolved: 2019; 7 years ago
- Ground: First Team: Sholing FC, Silverlake Arena, VT Sportsground, Portsmouth Road, Southampton, Hampshire, SO19 9PW
- Owner(s): Southampton Saints G&L FC Committee
- Chairperson: Tracey Wheeler
- Manager: Adam Lee
| Home colours | Away colours |

Southampton Saints Girls and Ladies Football Club, founded in 1979 as Red Star Southampton, was an English women's football club formerly affiliated with Southampton F.C.

At the end of the 2013–14 season the South West Combination WFL dissolved and the team moved into FA Women's Premier League - Division One South West. They finished 4th out of the 9 teams in the newly formed leagues' first season.

The club was disbanded due to financial reasons in July 2019.

== History ==
The club began in 1979 as Red Star Southampton, competing in the Home Counties League then the Southern Regions League. In 1991 Red Star won the Southern Region Division One and became founder members of the FA Women's Premier League National Division. In August 1991 the club were in Russia as guests of FC Spartak Moscow during the collapse of the Soviet Union. The first season at national level saw Red Star finish second in the League to Doncaster Belles and also lose the 1992 WFA Cup final 4–0 to the same opponents.

Red Star failed to build on their promising start and were relegated from the top flight in 1994–95. In summer 1995 the club became known as Southampton Saints due to affiliation with Southampton F.C., winning promotion as Southern Premier League champions in 1995–96.

However the club's second spell in the top-flight lasted only a season, as 1996–97 ended in another relegation. Southampton Saints then won the 1997–98 Southern Premier League and secured a mid-table finish in the 1998–99 National Premier League – being named Most Improved Side at the annual FA Awards. In 1999 the club reached its second FA Women's Cup final (not including the ten reached by Southampton W.F.C. in the first 11 years of the competition). This time they were beaten 2–0 by Arsenal Ladies, before a crowd of 6,450 at The Valley.

The club maintained its top-flight status and was merged into Southampton F.C. in 2001. As part of this process the Saints' long-serving manager Vanessa Raynbird was controversially sacked to make way for a male coach. The club was relegated in 2002–03 and this time was unable to bounce straight back, missing out on promotion by a point in 2003–04. Sue Lopez had been appointed manager in 2003. In 2005 Southampton FC were relegated from the men's Premier League and withdrew their support for Southampton Saints as a result.

The team continued as an independent outfit, but were relegated to the South West Combination in 2006–07 after a shambolic season in which they won just once and were unable to field a team for a match in February. They had evaded relegation by a point in 2005–06.

Yet another relegation saw the club playing at Southern Region level from 2008 until 2010, when they returned to the South West Combination as champions under the guidance of new manager Adam Lee.

== Stadium ==
Southampton Saints' First Team play at the home of Sholing F.C.: Universal Stadium, VT Sportsground, Portsmouth Road, Southampton, Hampshire. SO19 9PW

== Teams ==
As of April 2014:

- U10s - 1st in Winchester & District U10s Girls Football League
- U11s - 2nd in Winchester & District U12s Girls Football League Div 1
- U12s - 1st in Winchester & District U12s Girls Football League Div 1
- U13s - 1st in New Forest Girls U14 Group E Football League
- U14s - 1st in Winchester & District U14s Girls Football League Div 1
- U16s - 1st in New Forest U16 Girls Football League
- Ladies - 7th in South Western Combination Football League

== Players ==
=== Current squad ===
As of 8 July 2018.

Note: Flags indicate national team as defined under FIFA eligibility rules; some limited exceptions apply. Players may hold more than one non-FIFA nationality.

| No. | Pos. | Nation | Player |
|---|---|---|---|
| — | GK | | Hannah Haughton |
| — | DF | | Rebecca Davis |
| — | DF | | Kelly Fripp |
| — | DF | | Sabrina Morris Manoslava |
| — | DF | | Kerri Why |
| — | DF | | Aliss Wheeler |
| — | DF | | Aimee Burridge |
| — | DF | | Carla Mitchell |
| — | DF | | Kat Littleboy |
| — | DF | | Georgie Hoban |
| — | DF | | Amelia Southgate |

| No. | Pos. | Nation | Player |
|---|---|---|---|
| — | MF | | Emily Hardaker |
| — | MF | | Kaye Henton |
| — | MF | | Nicole Matthews |
| — | MF | | Carla Perkins |
| — | MF | | Becki Bath |
| — | MF | | Emma Eldridge |
| — | FW | | Rachel Anderson |
| — | FW | | Jess Lewry |
| — | FW | | Catherine Browning |
| — | FW | | Krystal Whyte |

=== Reserve squad ===
As of 7 June 2016.

Note: Flags indicate national team as defined under FIFA eligibility rules; some limited exceptions apply. Players may hold more than one non-FIFA nationality.

| No. | Pos. | Nation | Player |
|---|---|---|---|
| — | GK | | Rhianna Fallon |
| — | DF | | Kelly Fripp |
| — | DF | | Gemma Morrison |
| — | DF | | Kirsty Parkinson |
| — | DF | | Kaylee Senter |
| — | MF | | Nicky Curtis |
| — | MF | | Kate Early |
| — | MF | | Tiffany Eley |
| — | MF | | Rhyannon Evans |

| No. | Pos. | Nation | Player |
|---|---|---|---|
| — | MF | | Kelly Holmes |
| — | MF | | Emma King |
| — | MF | | Ellen Pearce |
| — | MF | | Lucy Pearce |
| — | MF | | Belinda Villa |
| — | FW | | Isabel Glover |
| — | FW | | Olivia Jones |
| — | FW | | Lauren Stansfield |

== Former players ==
For details of former players, see Category:Southampton Saints L.F.C. players.

== Training ==
Saints Train at Fleming Park, Passfield Avenue, Eastleigh, Hampshire SO50 9NL on Thursday evenings.

== Honours ==
=== Official ===
- FA Women's Premier League Southern Division:
  - Winners (2): 1995–96, 2007–08
- WFA National League Premier Division
  - Runners-up: 1991–92
- Women's FA Cup
  - Runners-up (2): 1991–92, 1998–99
- Southern Region Women's Premier:
  - Winners (1): 2009–10

=== Invitational ===
- Southampton Divisional FA Women's Challenge Cup:
  - Winners (5): 2012–13, 2013–14, 2014–15, 2015–16, 2017–18

== See also ==
- Southampton FC Women
- Southampton Women's FC
