= St Helens W.F.C. =

Women's football club in England

- Full name: St Helens Women's Football Club
- Founded: 1976
- Dissolved: 2006

St Helens Women's Football Club was a leading women's football club in England. They reached four WFA Cup finals in the 1980's and were victorious in 1980 when they defeated Preston North End 1-0. They dissolved in 2006.

== History ==
The club was founded in 1976 by Chris Slater and Liz Deighan, who had met at trials for the England women's national football team. They joined the Merseyside League, winning it three years running from 1978 to 1980, also winning the Merseyside Cup twice. In 1979/80, they won the Women's FA Cup, defeating Preston North End 1–0 in the final. Sue Holland scored the only goal of the game held at Southbury Road, Enfield, with Chris Slater becoming the first female manager to win the competition. This took them into the European Clubs Cup, and the team lost in the 1980/81 final.

The team then switched to the North West Women's League, winning the championship twice. They reached the final of the Women's FA Cup again in 1980/81, 1982/83, and 1986/87, but lost on each occasion. Twin sisters Judith and Janet Turner played in all four WFA Cup finals and England international Alison Leatherbarrow scored in both the 1981 and 1983 finals. Another notable player was Ann Harkins who played as a goalkeeper in the first three finals but captained the team as a defender in 1987. Sheila Parker, who is now an inductee in the English Football Hall of Fame played for St Helens in the 1983 final. Parker is famous for captaining England in their first ever international in 1972 vs Scotland. In later years, the club played in the Women's Premier League Northern Division, and the Midland Combination Women's Football League. They were renamed as the Garswood Saints, and under that name won the North West Women's Regional Football League in 2004/05.

In 2006, there was a fire at the team's clubhouse, in Garswood, and this led the club to disband at the end of the 2005/06 season.
