= Fodens Ladies F.C. =

Football team in England

Fodens Ladies F.C. was one of the leading women's football teams in the United Kingdom.

The team emerged as the works team for Edwin Foden, Sons & Co., based in Sandbach. Various dates for the team's formation have been given, from 1955 to 1961. In their early years, the team played friendly matches, including one in 1963 against Preston Ladies F.C., by which time the squad already included players who did not work at Fodens. In 1966, at a match against Cheshire Ladies, Jeannie Allott played her first match for the club, at only ten years old. The same year, they toured Northern Ireland, playing three charity matches there.

The team's first regular competition was the Butlin's Cup, which Fodens won in 1969 and 1970, leading them to be described as the British champions. They also entered the 1969 Deal International Tournament, losing to Manchester Corinthians on the final day. Of the team members, Allott, Sylvia Gore and Sheila Parker, all played in the first England women's national football team.

In 1970, the team was a founding member of the North West Women's League. In 1974, they won the Women's FA Cup, becoming the first to defeat Southampton in the competition. The game was previewed in The Observer, which interviewed Fodens' manager, Eric Aldersay. They continued to play throughout the 1970s, including tours of the Netherlands and Belgium. They continued playing until 1989.
