= 1991 FIFA Women's World Cup Group A =

Football tournament group stage

Group A of the 1991 FIFA Women's World Cup took place from 16 to 21 November 1991. The group consisted of hosts China PR, Denmark, New Zealand and Norway.

== Standings ==
Pos	Team	Pld	W	D	L	GF	GA	GD	Pts	Qualification
1	China (H)	3	2	1	0	10	3	+7	5	Advance to knockout stage
2	Norway	3	2	0	1	6	5	+1	4	Advance to knockout stage
3	Denmark	3	1	1	1	6	4	+2	3	Advance to knockout stage
4	New Zealand	3	0	0	3	1	11	−10	0	

Source: FIFA
Rules for classification: Group stage tiebreakers
(H) Hosts

== Matches ==
All times listed are local, CST (UTC+8).

=== China PR vs Norway ===
16 November 1991
20:45

China	4–0	Norway
Ma Li 22'; Liu Ailing 45', 50'; Sun Qingmei 75'	Report

Tianhe Stadium, Guangzhou
Attendance: 65,000
Referee: Salvador Imperatore (Chile)

GK	1	Zhong Honglian
DF	3	Ma Li
DF	5	Zhou Yang
DF	12	Wen Lirong
MF	4	Li Xiufu
MF	8	Zhou Hua
MF	9	Sun Wen	(substituted off) 70'
MF	10	Liu Ailing
FW	7	Wu Weiying	(substituted off) 47'
FW	11	Sun Qingmei
FW	13	Niu Lijie
Substitutions:
DF	6	Shui Qingxia	(substituted on) 47'
MF	17	Zhu Tao	(substituted on) 70'
Manager:
Shang Ruihua

GK	1	Reidun Seth
DF	5	Gunn Nyborg
DF	8	Heidi Støre
DF	16	Tina Svensson
MF	2	Cathrine Zaborowski
MF	4	Gro Espeseth	(substituted off) 62'
MF	6	Agnete Carlsen
MF	7	Tone Haugen
FW	9	Hege Riise
FW	10	Linda Medalen
FW	11	Birthe Hegstad	(substituted off) 59'
Substitutions:
FW	17	Ellen Scheel Aalbu	(substituted on) 59'
MF	15	Anette Igland	(substituted on) 62'
Manager:
Even Pellerud

=== Denmark vs New Zealand ===
17 November 1991
19:45

Denmark	3–0	New Zealand
H. Jensen 15', 40'; Mackensie 42'	Report

Tianhe Stadium, Guangzhou
Attendance: 14,000
Referee: Omer Yengo (Congo)

GK	1	Helle Bjerregaard
DF	2	Karina Sefron
DF	3	Jannie Hansen
DF	4	Bonny Madsen
MF	7	Susan Mackensie
MF	8	Lisbet Kolding	(substituted off) 64'
MF	12	Irene Stelling
MF	14	Marianne Jensen
FW	9	Annie Gam-Pedersen
FW	10	Helle Jensen
FW	11	Hanne Nissen	(substituted off) 54'
Substitutions:
FW	13	Annette Thychosen	(substituted on) 54'
MF	17	Lotte Bagge	(substituted on) 64'
Manager:
Keld Gantzhorn

GK	1	Leslie King
DF	2	Jocelyn Parr
DF	3	Cinnamon Chaney	(substituted off) 41'
DF	13	Kim Nye
MF	5	Deborah Pullen
MF	7	Maureen Jacobson
MF	8	Monique van de Elzen
MF	10	Donna Baker	(substituted off) 54'
MF	12	Julia Campbell
FW	9	Wendi Henderson
FW	11	Amanda Crawford
Substitutions:
DF	15	Terry McCahill	(substituted on) 41'
MF	6	Lorraine Taylor	(substituted on) 54'
Manager:
(England) Dave Boardman

=== Norway vs New Zealand ===
19 November 1991
15:30

Norway	4–0	New Zealand
McCahill 30' (o.g.); Medalen 32', 38'; Riise 49'	Report

Guangdong Provincial Stadium, Guangzhou
Attendance: 12,000
Referee: Salvador Imperatore (Chile)

GK	1	Reidun Seth
DF	5	Gunn Nyborg
DF	8	Heidi Støre
DF	16	Tina Svensson
MF	2	Cathrine Zaborowski
MF	6	Agnete Carlsen
MF	7	Tone Haugen		(substituted off) 76'
MF	13	Liv Strædet
FW	9	Hege Riise
FW	10	Linda Medalen	(yellow card) 34'
FW	11	Birthe Hegstad		(substituted off) 59'
Substitutions:
FW	17	Ellen Scheel Aalbu		(substituted on) 59'
MF	14	Margunn Humlestøl		(substituted on) 76'
Manager:
Even Pellerud

GK	1	Leslie King
DF	3	Cinnamon Chaney	(substituted off) 28'
DF	13	Kim Nye
DF	15	Terry McCahill
MF	5	Deborah Pullen
MF	6	Lorraine Taylor
MF	7	Maureen Jacobson
MF	10	Donna Baker
MF	12	Julia Campbell
FW	9	Wendi Henderson
FW	11	Amanda Crawford	(substituted off) 45'
Substitutions:
DF	4	Lynley Pedruco	(substituted on) 28'
MF	8	Monique van de Elzen	(substituted on) 45'
Manager:
(England) Dave Boardman

=== China PR vs Denmark ===
19 November 1991
19:45

China	2–2	Denmark
Sun Wen 37'; Wei Haiying 76'	Report	Kolding 24'; Nissen 55'

Guangdong Provincial Stadium, Guangzhou
Attendance: 27,000
Referee: Vassilios Nikakis (Greece)

GK	1	Zhong Honglian
DF	3	Ma Li
DF	5	Zhou Yang
DF	12	Wen Lirong
MF	4	Li Xiufu	(yellow card) 50'
MF	8	Zhou Hua
MF	9	Sun Wen
MF	10	Liu Ailing
FW	7	Wu Weiying		(substituted off) 59'
FW	11	Sun Qingmei
FW	13	Niu Lijie		(substituted off) 71'
Substitutions:
FW	14	Zhang Yan		(substituted on) 59'
FW	15	Wei Haiying		(substituted on) 71'
Manager:
Shang Ruihua

GK	1	Helle Bjerregaard
DF	2	Karina Sefron
DF	3	Jannie Hansen
DF	4	Bonny Madsen
DF	6	Mette Nielsen
MF	7	Susan Mackensie
MF	8	Lisbet Kolding
MF	12	Irene Stelling
FW	9	Annie Gam-Pedersen
FW	10	Helle Jensen
FW	11	Hanne Nissen	(substituted off) 71'
Substitutions:
MF	17	Lotte Bagge	(substituted on) 71'
Manager:
Keld Gantzhorn

=== China PR vs New Zealand ===
21 November 1991
19:45

China	4–1	New Zealand
Zhou Yang 20'; Liu Ailing 22', 60'; Wu Weiying 24'	Report	Nye 65'

New Plaza Stadium, Foshan
Attendance: 14,000
Referee: Raja Shrestha Gyanu (Nepal)

GK	1	Zhong Honglian
DF	3	Ma Li
DF	5	Zhou Yang
DF	12	Wen Lirong
MF	4	Li Xiufu	(substituted off) 28'
MF	8	Zhou Hua
MF	9	Sun Wen
MF	10	Liu Ailing
FW	7	Wu Weiying	(substituted off) 63'
FW	11	Sun Qingmei
FW	13	Niu Lijie
Substitutions:
DF	6	Shui Qingxia	(substituted on) 28'
FW	15	Wei Haiying	(substituted on) 63'
Manager:
Shang Ruihua

GK	1	Leslie King
DF	4	Lynley Pedruco
DF	13	Kim Nye
DF	15	Terry McCahill
MF	5	Deborah Pullen
MF	6	Lorraine Taylor
MF	7	Maureen Jacobson
MF	8	Monique van de Elzen
MF	10	Donna Baker	(substituted off) 26'
MF	17	Lynne Warring	(substituted off) 65'
FW	9	Wendi Henderson
Substitutions:
FW	11	Amanda Crawford	(substituted on) 26'
MF	12	Julia Campbell	(substituted on) 65'
Manager:
(England) Dave Boardman

=== Norway vs Denmark ===
21 November 1991
19:45

Norway	2–1	Denmark
Svensson 14' (pen.); Medalen 56'	Report	Thychosen 54' (pen.)

Ying Tung Stadium, Guangzhou
Attendance: 15,500
Referee: Vadim Zhuk (Soviet Union)

GK	1	Reidun Seth
DF	5	Gunn Nyborg	(yellow card) 33'
DF	8	Heidi Støre
DF	16	Tina Svensson
MF	2	Cathrine Zaborowski
MF	6	Agnete Carlsen
MF	7	Tone Haugen
MF	13	Liv Strædet		(substituted off) 29'
FW	9	Hege Riise
FW	10	Linda Medalen	(yellow card) 30'	(substituted off) 62'
FW	11	Birthe Hegstad
Substitutions:
MF	4	Gro Espeseth		(substituted on) 29'
FW	17	Ellen Scheel Aalbu		(substituted on) 62'
Manager:
Even Pellerud

GK	1	Helle Bjerregaard
DF	2	Karina Sefron
DF	3	Jannie Hansen
DF	4	Bonny Madsen
DF	6	Mette Nielsen	(substituted off) 41'
MF	7	Susan Mackensie
MF	8	Lisbet Kolding
MF	12	Irene Stelling
FW	9	Annie Gam-Pedersen
FW	10	Helle Jensen
FW	11	Hanne Nissen	(substituted off) 50'
Substitutions:
FW	13	Annette Thychosen	(substituted on) 41'
MF	14	Marianne Jensen	(substituted on) 50'
Manager:
Keld Gantzhorn

== See also ==
- China at the FIFA Women's World Cup
- Denmark at the FIFA Women's World Cup
- New Zealand at the FIFA Women's World Cup
- Norway at the FIFA Women's World Cup
