= 1991 FIFA Women's World Cup knockout stage =

Association football competition

The knockout stage of the 1991 FIFA Women's World Cup was the second and final stage of the competition, following the group stage. It began on 24 November with the quarter-finals and ended on 30 November 1991 with the final match, held at the Tianhe Stadium in Guangzhou. A total of eight teams (the top two teams from each group, along with the two best third-placed teams) advanced to the knockout stage to compete in a single-elimination style tournament.

All times listed are local, CST (UTC+8).

== Format ==
In the knockout stage, if a match was level at the end of 80 minutes of normal playing time, 20 minutes of extra time was played (two periods of 10 minutes each). If still tied after extra time, the match was decided by a penalty shoot-out to determine the winner.

The quarter-final match-ups depended on the two third-placed teams which qualified. FIFA set out the following schedule for the semi-finals:

- Match 23: Winner Match 19 v Winner Match 20
- Match 24: Winner Match 21 v Winner Match 22

The third place play-off match-up was:

- Match 25: Loser Match 23 v Loser Match 24

The final match-up was:

- Match 26: Winner Match 23 v Winner Match 24

=== Combinations of matches in the quarter-finals ===
In the quarter-finals, all matches were played on 24 November 1991. The specific match-ups and schedule depended on which two third-placed teams qualified for the quarter-finals:

Combination according to the two qualified teams

Third-placed teams qualify from groups			Match 19 Tianhe 19:45	Match 20 Jiangmen 19:45	Match 21 Zhongshan 15:30	Match 22 Foshan 19:45
A	B		1A v 3B	2A v 1C	3A v 1B	2B v 2C
A		C	1A v 2B	2A v 2C	3A v 1C	1B v 3C
	B	C	1A v 3B	2A v 1C	1B v 3C	2B v 2C

== Qualified teams ==
The top two placed teams from each of the three groups, plus the two best-placed third teams, qualified for the knockout stage.

Group	Winners	Runners-up	Third-placed teams (Best two qualified)
A	China	Norway	Denmark
B	United States	Sweden	—N/a
C	Germany	Italy	Chinese Taipei

== Bracket ==
Quarter-finals
24 November – Guangzhou (Tianhe)
China	0
Sweden	1
24 November – Jiangmen
Norway (a.e.t.)	3
Italy	2
24 November – Zhongshan
Denmark	1
Germany (a.e.t.)	2
24 November – Foshan
United States	7
Chinese Taipei	0

Semi-finals
27 November – Guangzhou (Ying Tung)
Sweden	1
Norway	4
27 November – Guangzhou (Provincial)
Germany	2
United States	5

Final
30 November – Guangzhou (Tianhe)
Norway	1
United States	2
Third place play-off
29 November – Guangzhou (Provincial)
Sweden	4
Germany	0

== Quarter-finals ==
=== Denmark vs Germany ===
24 November 1991
15:30

Denmark	1–2 (a.e.t.)	Germany
Mackensie 25' (pen.)	Report	Wiegmann 17' (pen.); Mohr 98'

Zhongshan Stadium, Zhongshan
Attendance: 12,000
Referee: Vassilios Nikakis (Greece)

GK	1	Helle Bjerregaard
DF	2	Karina Sefron	(yellow card) 17'
DF	4	Bonny Madsen
DF	6	Mette Nielsen
MF	7	Susan Mackensie
MF	8	Lisbet Kolding
MF	12	Irene Stelling
FW	9	Annie Gam-Pedersen	(yellow card) 70'
FW	10	Helle Jensen		(substituted off) 73'
FW	11	Hanne Nissen		(substituted off) 47'
FW	13	Annette Thychosen
Substitutions:
MF	18	Janne Rasmussen		(substituted on) 47'
MF	17	Lotte Bagge		(substituted on) 73'
Manager:
Keld Gantzhorn

GK	1	Marion Isbert
DF	3	Birgitt Austermühl	(yellow card) 37'
DF	5	Doris Fitschen
DF	6	Frauke Kuhlmann
MF	7	Martina Voss
MF	8	Bettina Wiegmann
MF	13	Roswitha Bindl		(substituted off) 89'
MF	14	Petra Damm
MF	15	Christine Paul
FW	9	Heidi Mohr
FW	16	Gudrun Gottschlich		(substituted off) 51'
Substitutions:
DF	2	Britta Unsleber		(substituted on) 51'
MF	11	Beate Wendt		(substituted on) 89'
Manager:
Gero Bisanz

=== China PR vs Sweden ===
24 November 1991
19:45

China	0–1	Sweden
	Report	Sundhage 3'

Tianhe Stadium, Guangzhou
Attendance: 55,000
Referee: John Toro Rendón (Colombia)

GK	1	Zhong Honglian
DF	3	Ma Li	(yellow card) 66'
DF	5	Zhou Yang
DF	12	Wen Lirong
MF	4	Li Xiufu
MF	8	Zhou Hua
MF	9	Sun Wen
MF	10	Liu Ailing
FW	7	Wu Weiying		(substituted off) 75'
FW	11	Sun Qingmei
FW	14	Zhang Yan		(substituted off) 45'
Substitutions:
FW	15	Wei Haiying		(substituted on) 45'
FW	13	Niu Lijie		(substituted on) 75'
Manager:
Shang Ruihua

GK	1	Elisabeth Leidinge
DF	2	Malin Lundgren	(yellow card) 39'
DF	3	Anette Hansson
DF	5	Eva Zeikfalvy
MF	7	Pia Sundhage
MF	16	Ingrid Johansson		(substituted off) 65'
MF	17	Marie Karlsson
FW	9	Helen Johansson	(yellow card) 57'
FW	10	Lena Videkull
FW	11	Anneli Andelén	(yellow card) 58'
FW	15	Helen Nilsson		(substituted off) 67'
Substitutions:
DF	13	Marie Ewrelius		(substituted on) 65'
MF	8	Susanne Hedberg		(substituted on) 67'
Manager:
Gunilla Paijkull

=== Norway vs Italy ===
24 November 1991
19:45

Norway	3–2 (a.e.t.)	Italy
Hegstad 22'; Carlsen 67'; Svensson 96' (pen.)	Report	Salmaso 31'; Guarino 80'

Jiangmen Stadium, Jiangmen
Attendance: 13,000
Referee: Rafael Rodríguez Medina (El Salvador)

GK	1	Reidun Seth
DF	5	Gunn Nyborg
DF	8	Heidi Støre
DF	16	Tina Svensson
MF	2	Cathrine Zaborowski
MF	6	Agnete Carlsen
MF	7	Tone Haugen
MF	14	Margunn Humlestøl		(substituted off) 79'
FW	9	Hege Riise	(yellow card) 97'
FW	11	Birthe Hegstad
FW	17	Ellen Scheel Aalbu
Substitutions:
MF	15	Anette Igland		(substituted on) 79'
Manager:
Even Pellerud

GK	1	Stefania Antonini
DF	3	Marina Cordenons	(yellow card) 20'
DF	5	Raffaella Salmaso		(substituted off) 36'
DF	13	Emma Iozzelli
DF	14	Elisabetta Bavagnoli
MF	4	Maria Mariotti		(substituted off) 68'
MF	8	Federica D'Astolfo
MF	10	Feriana Ferraguzzi
MF	11	Adele Marsiletti
FW	7	Silvia Fiorini
FW	9	Carolina Morace
Substitutions:
DF	2	Paola Bonato		(substituted on) 36'
FW	18	Rita Guarino		(substituted on) 68'
Manager:
Sergio Guenza

=== United States vs Chinese Taipei ===
24 November 1991
19:45

United States	7–0	Chinese Taipei
Akers-Stahl 8', 29', 33', 44' (pen.), 48'; Foudy 38'; Biefeld 79'	Report

New Plaza Stadium, Foshan
Attendance: 12,000
Referee: Omer Yengo (Congo)

GK	1	Mary Harvey
DF	4	Carla Werden	(substituted off) 57'
DF	8	Linda Hamilton
DF	14	Joy Biefeld
MF	3	Shannon Higgins
MF	9	Mia Hamm
MF	11	Julie Foudy
MF	13	Kristine Lilly
FW	2	April Heinrichs	(substituted off) 41'
FW	10	Michelle Akers-Stahl
FW	12	Carin Jennings
Substitutions:
DF	16	Debbie Belkin	(substituted on) 41'
DF	5	Lori Henry	(substituted on) 57'
Manager:
Anson Dorrance

GK	1	Hong Li-chyn
DF	3	Chen Shwu-ju	(yellow card) 23'
DF	4	Lo Chu-yin
DF	11	Hsu Chia-cheng
DF	12	Lan Lan-fen
DF	15	Wu Min-hsun
MF	6	Chou Tai-ying
MF	8	Shieh Su-jean
MF	9	Wu Su-ching		(substituted off) 74'
MF	16	Chen Shu-chin
FW	7	Lin Mei-chun
Substitutions:
MF	2	Liu Hsiu-mei		(substituted on) 74'
Manager:
Chong Tsu-pin

== Semi-finals ==
=== Sweden vs Norway ===
27 November 1991
15:30

Sweden	1–4	Norway
Videkull 6'	Report	Svensson 39' (pen.); Medalen 41', 77'; Carlsen 67'

Ying Tung Stadium, Guangzhou
Attendance: 16,000
Referee: Jim McCluskey (Scotland)

GK	1	Elisabeth Leidinge
DF	2	Malin Lundgren
DF	3	Anette Hansson	(substituted off) 51'
DF	5	Eva Zeikfalvy
DF	13	Marie Ewrelius
MF	7	Pia Sundhage
MF	8	Susanne Hedberg	(substituted off) 63'
MF	16	Ingrid Johansson
MF	17	Marie Karlsson
FW	10	Lena Videkull
FW	11	Anneli Andelén
Substitutions:
FW	15	Helen Nilsson	(substituted on) 51'
MF	6	Malin Swedberg	(substituted on) 63'
Manager:
Gunilla Paijkull

GK	1	Reidun Seth
DF	5	Gunn Nyborg
DF	8	Heidi Støre
DF	16	Tina Svensson	(substituted off) 61'
MF	2	Cathrine Zaborowski
MF	4	Gro Espeseth
MF	6	Agnete Carlsen
MF	7	Tone Haugen
FW	9	Hege Riise
FW	10	Linda Medalen
FW	11	Birthe Hegstad
Substitutions:
MF	15	Anette Igland	(substituted on) 61'
Manager:
Even Pellerud

=== Germany vs United States ===
27 November 1991
19:45

Germany	2–5	United States
Mohr 34'; Wiegmann 63'	Report	Jennings 10', 22', 33'; Heinrichs 54', 75'

Guangdong Provincial Stadium, Guangzhou
Attendance: 15,000
Referee: Salvador Imperatore (Chile)

GK	1	Marion Isbert
DF	3	Birgitt Austermühl		(substituted off) 60'
DF	4	Jutta Nardenbach
DF	5	Doris Fitschen	(yellow card) 59'
DF	6	Frauke Kuhlmann
MF	7	Martina Voss
MF	8	Bettina Wiegmann
MF	13	Roswitha Bindl
MF	15	Christine Paul
FW	9	Heidi Mohr
FW	16	Gudrun Gottschlich		(substituted off) 50'
Substitutions:
MF	11	Beate Wendt		(substituted on) 50'
DF	2	Britta Unsleber		(substituted on) 60'
Manager:
Gero Bisanz

GK	1	Mary Harvey
DF	4	Carla Werden
DF	8	Linda Hamilton
DF	14	Joy Biefeld
MF	3	Shannon Higgins
MF	9	Mia Hamm
MF	11	Julie Foudy
MF	13	Kristine Lilly
FW	2	April Heinrichs
FW	10	Michelle Akers-Stahl	(yellow card) 67'
FW	12	Carin Jennings
Manager:
Anson Dorrance

== Third place play-off ==
29 November 1991
19:45

Sweden	4–0	Germany
Andelén 7'; Sundhage 11'; Videkull 29'; Nilsson 43'	Report

Guangdong Provincial Stadium, Guangzhou
Attendance: 20,000
Referee: Cláudia Vasconcelos (Brazil)

GK	1	Elisabeth Leidinge
DF	2	Malin Lundgren
DF	5	Eva Zeikfalvy
DF	13	Marie Ewrelius
MF	6	Malin Swedberg
MF	7	Pia Sundhage
MF	17	Marie Karlsson
FW	9	Helen Johansson
FW	10	Lena Videkull
FW	11	Anneli Andelén	(yellow card) 60'
FW	15	Helen Nilsson	(yellow card) 53'
Manager:
Gunilla Paijkull

GK	1	Marion Isbert	(substituted off) 60'
DF	2	Britta Unsleber
DF	4	Jutta Nardenbach
DF	5	Doris Fitschen
MF	7	Martina Voss
MF	8	Bettina Wiegmann
MF	11	Beate Wendt
MF	13	Roswitha Bindl	(substituted off) 38'
MF	14	Petra Damm
FW	9	Heidi Mohr
FW	16	Gudrun Gottschlich
Substitutions:
FW	18	Michaela Kubat	(substituted on) 38'
GK	12	Elke Walther	(substituted on) 60'
Manager:
Gero Bisanz

== Final ==
30 November 1991
19:45

Norway	1–2	United States
Medalen 29'	Report	Akers-Stahl 20', 78'

Tianhe Stadium, Guangzhou
Attendance: 63,000
Referee: Vadim Zhuk (Soviet Union)

Norway	United States

GK	1	Reidun Seth
SW	8	Heidi Støre (c)
CB	16	Tina Svensson
CB	4	Gro Espeseth
CB	5	Gunn Nyborg
DM	2	Cathrine Zaborowski	(substituted off) 79'
CM	7	Tone Haugen
CM	6	Agnete Carlsen
RW	9	Hege Riise
CF	10	Linda Medalen
LW	11	Birthe Hegstad
Substitutions:
MF	13	Liv Strædet	(substituted on) 79'
Manager:
Even Pellerud

GK	1	Mary Harvey
SW	4	Carla Werden
CB	9	Mia Hamm
CB	14	Joy Biefeld
CB	8	Linda Hamilton
DM	11	Julie Foudy
CM	3	Shannon Higgins
CM	13	Kristine Lilly
RW	2	April Heinrichs (c)
CF	10	Michelle Akers-Stahl	(yellow card) 54'
LW	12	Carin Jennings
Manager:
Anson Dorrance

Assistant referees:
Ingrid Jonsson (Sweden)
Gertrud Regus (Germany)
