= List of UEFA Women's European Championship penalty shoot-outs =

This is a list of all penalty shoot-outs that have occurred in the Finals tournament of the UEFA Women's Championship.

== Complete list ==
Key

- (penalty scored) = scored penalty
- (penalty missed) = missed penalty
- golden background = scored penalty which ended the shoot-out
- red background = missed penalty which ended the shoot-out
- grey background = first penalty in the shoot-out
- horizontal line within a list of takers = beginning of the sudden death stage

Penalty shoot-outs in the UEFA Women's Championship
#	Year	Round	Winner	F	Loser	Penalties			Winning team		Losing team		Date	Venue	
#	Year	Round	Winner	F	Loser	S	M	T	GK	Takers	Takers	GK	Date	City	Stadium
1	1984, No host	Final	Sweden	1–1 (Note: The Final was played over two legs. Both teams won their home leg 1–0, so it was 1–1 on aggregate.)	England	4–3	1–2	5–5	Leidinge	Börjesson (penalty scored); Andersson (penalty scored); Björk (penalty missed); Jansson (penalty scored); Sundhage (penalty scored)	(penalty missed) Curl; (penalty scored) Gallimore; (penalty scored) Bampton; (penalty missed) Hanson; (penalty scored) Davis	Wiseman	27 May 1984	Kenilworth Road	Luton
2	1989, West Germany	Semi-finals	West Germany	1–1	Italy	4–3	3–4	7–7	Isbert	Kuhlmann (penalty scored); Bindl (penalty scored); Fitschen (penalty scored); Fehrmann (penalty missed); Landers (penalty missed) Voss (penalty missed); Isbert (penalty scored)	(penalty scored) Ferraguzzi; (penalty missed) Carta; (penalty scored) Morace; (penalty missed) Vignotto; (penalty scored) D'Astolfo (penalty missed) Iozzelli; (penalty missed) Marsiletti	Iozzelli	28 June 1989	Leimbachstadion	Siegen
3	1991, Denmark	Semi-finals	Norway	0–0	Denmark	8–7	1–2	9–9	Seth	Svensson (penalty scored); Aarønes (penalty missed); Carlsen (penalty scored); Zaborowski (penalty scored); Riise (penalty scored) Medalen (penalty scored); Hegstad (penalty scored); Nyborg (penalty scored); Espeseth (penalty scored)	(penalty scored) Kolding; (penalty scored) Thychosen; (penalty scored) Sefron; (penalty missed) Jacobsen; (penalty scored) Bagge (penalty scored) Gam-Pedersen; (penalty scored) Christensen; (penalty scored) J. Hansen; (penalty missed) M. Jensen	Bjerregaard	10 July 1991	Hjørring Stadium	Hjørring
4	1993, Italy	Semi-finals	Italy	1–1	Germany	4–3				Marsiletti (penalty scored); Salmaso (penalty scored); Ferraguzzi (penalty scored); Iozzelli (penalty scored)	(penalty scored) Wiegmann; (penalty scored) Austermühl; (penalty scored) Pohlmann; (penalty missed) ?? (penalty missed) ??				
5	2009, Finland	Quarter-finals	Netherlands	0–0	France	5–4	2–3	7–7	Geurts	Stevens (penalty scored); Melis (penalty scored); Kiesel-Griffioen (penalty scored); Smit (penalty scored); Koster (penalty missed) Bito (penalty missed); Hoogendijk (penalty scored)	(penalty scored) Soubeyrand; (penalty scored) Abily; (penalty scored) Henry; (penalty scored) Le Sommer; (penalty missed) Franco (penalty missed) Meilleroux; (penalty missed) Herbert	Deville	3 September 2009	Ratina	Tampere
6	2013, Sweden	Quarter-finals	Denmark	1–1	France	4–2	1–2	5–4	Petersen	Røddik (penalty scored); Rydahl (penalty scored); Nadim (penalty scored); Nielsen (penalty missed); Arnth (penalty scored)	(penalty missed) Nécib; (penalty scored) Thiney; (penalty scored) Le Sommer; (penalty missed) Delannoy	Bouhaddi	22 July 2013	Arena Linköping	Linköping
7	2013, Sweden	Semi-finals	Norway	1–1	Denmark	4–2	1–3	5–4	Hjelmseth	Gulbrandsen (penalty scored); Dekkerhus (penalty scored); Mjelde (penalty scored); Rønning (penalty scored)	(penalty missed) Røddik; (penalty missed) Nielsen; (penalty scored) Nadim; (penalty scored) Brogaard	Petersen	25 July 2013	Nya Parken	Norrköping
8	2017, Netherlands	Quarter-finals	Austria	0–0	Spain	5–3	0–2	5–4	Zinsberger	Feiersinger (penalty scored); Burger (penalty scored); Aschauer (penalty scored); Pinther (penalty scored); Puntigam (penalty scored)	(penalty scored) García; (penalty scored) Sampedro; (penalty missed) Meseguer; (penalty scored) Corredera	Paños	30 July 2017	Koning Willem II	Tilburg
9	2017, Netherlands	Semi-finals	Denmark	0–0	Austria	3–0	1–3	4–4	Petersen	Nadim (penalty scored); Harder (penalty scored); Junge (penalty missed); Boye Sørensen (penalty scored)	(penalty missed) Feiersinger; (penalty missed) Pinther; (penalty missed) Aschauer	Zinsberger	3 August 2017	Rat Verlegh	Breda
10	2025, Switzerland	Quarter-finals	England	2–2	Sweden	3–2	4–5	7–7	Hampton	Russo (penalty scored); James (penalty missed); Mead (penalty missed); Greenwood (penalty missed); Kelly (penalty scored) Clinton (penalty missed); Bronze (penalty scored)	(penalty missed) Angeldahl; (penalty scored) Zigiotti Olme; (penalty missed) Eriksson; (penalty scored) Björn; (penalty missed) Falk (penalty missed) Jakobsson; (penalty missed) Holmberg	Falk	17 July 2025	Letzigrund	Zurich
11	2025, Switzerland	Quarter-finals	Germany	1–1	France	3–2	1–2	7–7	Berger	Minge (penalty scored); Dallmann (penalty scored); Knaak (penalty scored); Däbritz (penalty missed); Berger (penalty scored) Bühl (penalty scored); Nüsken (penalty scored)	(penalty missed) Majri; (penalty scored) Karchaoui; (penalty scored) Malard; (penalty scored) Baltimore; (penalty scored) Jean-François (penalty scored) N'Dongala; (penalty missed) Sombath	Peyraud-Magnin	19 July 2025	St. Jakob-Park	Basel
12	2025, Switzerland	Final	England	1–1	Spain	3–1	2–3	5–4	Hampton	Mead (penalty missed); Greenwood (penalty scored); Charles (penalty scored); Williamson (penalty missed); Kelly (penalty scored)	(penalty scored) Guijarro; (penalty missed) Caldentey; (penalty missed) Bonmatí; (penalty missed) Paralluelo	Coll	27 July 2025	St. Jakob-Park	Basel

== See also ==
- List of FIFA Women's World Cup penalty shoot-outs
- List of UEFA European Championship penalty shoot-outs
