= List of Denmark women's international footballers =

This list contains players who have made 25 or more appearances on the Denmark women's national football team. According to the Danish Football Association (DBU) 271 players have appeared for the team since the first official match took place in 1974. The list will note players who placed in any unofficial competitions held before the Danish team was officially recognised by DBU in 1974.

== Key ==
	Tournament medalists at the: 2017 EC — 2017 Euros - (silver) Runners-up; 1993 EC — 1993 Euros - (bronze) Third; 1991 EC — 1991 Euros - (bronze) Third
	**UNOFFICIAL** tournament medalists at the: 1979 EC — 1979 Euros - (gold) Winners; 1971 WC — 1971 World Cup - (gold) Winners; 1970 WC — 1970 World Cup - (gold) Winners; 1969 EC – 1969 Euros - (silver) Runners-up
**Bold**	Currently available for selection. Correct as of 9 June 2026.
Pos	Positions
GK	Goalkeeper
DF	Defender
MF	Midfielder
FW	Forward

== List of players ==
#	Player	Pos.	Caps	Goals	Debut	Last cap	Medals
1	Katrine Pedersen	MF	210	9	1994	2013	
2	Sanne Troelsgaard	MF	197	57	2008	2025	2017 EC (silver)
3	**Pernille Harder**	FW	173	85	2009	2026	2017 EC (silver)
4	**Katrine Veje**	DF	171	9	2009	2025	2017 EC (silver)
5	Johanna Rasmussen	FW	153	41	2002	2018	
6	Merete Pedersen	FW	136	65	1993	2009	
7	Theresa Eslund	DF	133	5	2008	2020	2017 EC (silver)
8	Line Røddik Hansen	DF	132	13	2006	2017	2017 EC (silver)
9	Cathrine Paaske Sørensen	MF	121	36	2000	2010	
10	Anne Dot Eggers Nielsen	MF	118	26	1993	2007	
11	Nanna Christiansen	MF	112	12	2009	2021	2017 EC (silver)
12	Lene Jensen	FW	109	26	1996	2010	
13	Nadia Nadim	FW	108	38	2009	2025	2017 EC (silver)
14	Mariann Gajhede Knudsen	MF	107	6	2003	2015	
15	Lene Terp	DF	105	4	1993	2003	
16	Louise Hansen	MF	98	5	1995	2007	
16	**Simone Boye**	DF	98	5	2011	2026	2017 EC (silver)
18	**Frederikke Thøgersen**	DF	96	3	2014	2026	2017 EC (silver)
19	Janni Arnth	DF	93	2	2010	2019	2017 EC (silver)
20	Julie Rydahl Bukh	MF	91	10	2001	2013	
21	Gitte Krogh	FW	90	46	1994	2001	
22	**Sofie Junge**	MF	89	7	2011	2026	2017 EC (silver)
23	Stina Lykke Borg	GK	83	0	2011	2018	2017 EC (silver)
24	**Stine Ballisager**	DF	81	4	2012	2026	2017 EC (silver)
25	Heidi Johansen	GK	80	0	2000	2012	
25	**Stine Sandbech**	DF	80	22	2015	2026	2017 EC (silver)
27	Gitte Andersen	DF	79	1	2000	2007	
28	Helle Jensen	FW	77	38	1987	1996	1991 EC (bronze); 1993 EC (bronze)
29	Mia Brogaard	DF	76	5	2002	2013	
30	Karina Sefron	DF	71	0	1988	1998	1991 EC (bronze); 1993 EC (bronze)
31	Bonny Madsen	DF	70	3	1987	1997	1991 EC (bronze); 1993 EC (bronze)
31	Christina Petersen	MF	70	10	1992	2001	
33	Tine Cederkvist	GK	68	0	2000	2011	
34	Christina Ørntoft	DF	67	1	2005	2013	
35	Line Sigvardsen Jensen	MF	66	2	2009	2017	2017 EC (silver)
35	Lisbet Kolding	MF	66	7	1989	1996	1991 EC (bronze); 1993 EC (bronze)
37	Dorthe Larsen	GK	65	0	1993	2005	
37	**Sofie Svava**	MF	65	5	2019	2026	
39	Lotte Bagge	MF	63	6	1985	1994	1991 EC (bronze); 1993 EC (bronze)
39	Irene Stelling	FW	63	2	1990	1998	1991 EC (bronze); 1993 EC (bronze)
41	Janne Madsen	MF	61	4	2000	2009	
42	Rikke Holm	DF	60	9	1990	1998	
43	Lone Smidt Nielsen	MF	57	22	1977	1988	1979 EC (gold)
43	**Janni Thomsen**	MF	57	11	2020	2026	
43	**Kathrine Kühl**	MF	57	3	2021	2026	
46	Helle Bjerregaard	GK	56	0	1987	1996	1991 EC (bronze); 1993 EC (bronze)
46	Bettina Falk	DF	56	0	2003	2008	
46	Annie Gam-Pedersen	FW	56	15	1982	1991	1991 EC (bronze)
49	**Signe Bruun**	FW	55	25	2017	2025	
50	Nicoline Sørensen	FW	54	8	2016	2023	2017 EC (silver)
50	Rikke Sevecke	DF	54	5	2016	2023	
52	Maiken Pape	FW	48	23	2006	2010	
52	Birgit Christensen	MF	48	8	1994	1999	
52	**Emma Snerle**	MF	48	3	2019	2025	
55	**Amalie Vangsgaard**	FW	47	14	2022	2026	
56	Christina Bonde	MF	46	9	1995	2003	
56	Annette Thychosen	FW	46	13	1988	1994	1991 EC (bronze); 1993 EC (bronze)
58	Annette Mogensen	DF	45	8	1980	1988	
58	**Mille Gejl**	MF	45	7	2019	2026	
60	Mette Jokumsen	FW	44	10	1999	2005	
61	Kamma Flæng	DF	43	9	1995	1998	
62	Dorte Dalum Jensen	DF	41	1	1999	2007	
62	Janni Johansen	FW	41	10	1997	2004	
64	Marianne Jensen	MF	40	5	1989	1995	1991 EC (bronze); 1993 EC (bronze)
64	Janne Rasmussen	MF	40	11	1991	1999	
66	Jannie Hansen	MF	39	4	1986	1992	1991 EC (bronze)
66	Lise Overgaard Munk	FW	39	5	2009	2017	
66	**Josefine Hasbo**	MF	39	3	2020	2026	
69	Kirsten Fabrin	MF	38	4	1977	1987	
69	**Karen Holmgaard**	MF	38	3	2018	2025	
71	Nadia Kjældgaard	MF	36	3	1999	2005	
71	Cecilie Sandvej	DF	36	1	2009	2019	2017 EC (silver)
73	Jeanne Axelsen	MF	35	4	1994	1999	
74	Gitte Hansen	GK	34	0	1981	1991	
75	Jette Hansen	DF	33	2	1980	1987	
75	Fridel Riggelsen	MF	33	1	1974	1981	1979 EC (gold)
75	Camilla Sand Andersen	DF	33	8	2005	2009	
75	**Rikke Madsen**	FW	33	1	2019	2024	
79	Lene Madsen	FW	32	10	1994	1996	
80	Pernille Obel	MF	31	8	1985	1991	1991 EC (bronze)
80	Susanne Niemann	DF	31	11	1974	1982	1979 EC (gold)
80	Kristine Pedersen	MF	31	7	2008	2012	
80	**Sara Holmgaard**	DF	31	4	2019	2026	
80	**Lene Christensen**	GK	31	0	2020	2023	
85	Stine Kjær Dimun	FW	30	3	2003	2007	
85	**Sara Thrige**	DF	30	2	2016	2026	
87	Hanne Sand Christensen	DF	29	0	1994	1999	
87	Hanne Nissen	DF	29	10	1989	1993	
89	Nanna Mølbach Johansen	MF	28	3	2005	2014	
89	Charlotte Nielsen-Mann	DF	28	3	1974	1985	
91	Anne Grete Holst	DF	27	7	1976	1981	1979 EC (gold)
91	Marianne Riis	GK	27	0	1978	1985	1979 EC (gold)
91	Susan Mackensie	DF	27	6	1983	1993	
91	Maja Kildemoes	MF	27	1	2015	2018	2017 EC (silver)
95	Mie Leth Jans	DF	26	0	2013	2018	2017 EC (silver)
95	Vibeke Mortensen	MF	26	2	1975	1980	1979 EC (gold)
95	**Sofie Bredgaard**	FW	26	3	2022	2026	
98	Marianne Jacobsen	MF	25	1	1987	1991	1991 EC (bronze)
98	Inge Hindkjær	FW	25	11	1977	1984	1979 EC (gold)
98	Inger Pedersen	MF	25	3	1975	1982	1979 EC (gold)
98	Signe Højen Andersen	MF	25	0	2000	2004	
98	Luna Gevitz	DF	25	0	2014	2023	2017 EC (silver)

== See also ==
- Denmark women's national football team results
