= New Zealand at the FIFA Women's World Cup =

The New Zealand women's national football team has represented New Zealand at the FIFA Women's World Cup on six occasions in 1991, 2007, 2011, 2015, 2019 and 2023. New Zealand co-hosted the 2023 FIFA Women's World Cup with Australia. They have never advanced beyond the group stage.

== 1991 FIFA Women's World Cup ==
New Zealand competed in qualifying for the World Cup in the People's Republic of China. Competing at the 1991 OFC Women's Championship, New Zealand took out the Oceania title by goal difference over Australia as the Australians could only score eight goals in the final match against Papua New Guinea where they needed sixteen goals to qualify through.

Competing in Group A, New Zealand were drawn to take on China (host nation), Denmark and Norway. In New Zealand opening game at Guangzhou, they would lose 3–0 to Denmark. The following match which was held at the Guangdong Provincial Stadium saw a 4–0 defeat to Norway before losing to China 4–1 in the final group match at Foshan. During this game Kim Nye scored the first World Cup goal for New Zealand in the 65th minute.

=== Group A ===
Pos	Team	Pld	W	D	L	GF	GA	GD	Pts	Qualification
1	China (H)	3	2	1	0	10	3	+7	5	Advance to knockout stage
2	Norway	3	2	0	1	6	5	+1	4	Advance to knockout stage
3	Denmark	3	1	1	1	6	4	+2	3	Advance to knockout stage
4	New Zealand	3	0	0	3	1	11	−10	0	

Source: FIFA
(H) Hosts
17 November 1991
19:45

Denmark	3–0	New Zealand
H. Jensen 15', 40'; Mackensie 42'	Report

Tianhe Stadium, Guangzhou
Attendance: 14,000
Referee: Omer Yengo (Congo)

19 November 1991
15:30

Norway	4–0	New Zealand
McCahill 30' (o.g.); Medalen 32', 38'; Riise 49'	Report

Guangdong Provincial Stadium, Guangzhou
Attendance: 12,000
Referee: Salvador Imperatore (Chile)

21 November 1991
19:45

China	4–1	New Zealand
Zhou Yang 20'; Liu Ailing 22', 60'; Wu Weiying 24'	Report	Nye 65'

New Plaza Stadium, Foshan
Attendance: 14,000
Referee: Raja Shrestha Gyanu (Nepal)

== 2007 FIFA Women's World Cup ==
New Zealand next appearance at the FIFA Women's World Cup was at the 2007 FIFA Women's World Cup after they had finished second in the previous three OFC Women's Championships to Australia who would qualify through to the World Cup on each occasion. After Australia left the OFC to join the AFC in late June 2005, New Zealand was left as the biggest team in Oceania. At the 2007 OFC Women's Championship in Papua New Guinea, New Zealand took out their second title after scoring 21 goals in the three matches that were played against Tonga (6–1), Samoa (8–0) and Papua New Guinea (7–0). Kirsty Yallop and Nicola Smith was the top goalscorers of the tournament with four goals each.

At the World Cup, New Zealand were drawn in Group D with host nation China, Denmark and Brazil. New Zealand first match of the group was against Brazil. Playing at Wuhan, Brazil would have four different goalscorers as New Zealand would lose 5–0 in their opening game. This was followed up by consecutive 2–0 defeats to Denmark, and China which meant that for New Zealand they would leave the competition without a goal.

=== Group D ===
Pos	Team	Pld	W	D	L	GF	GA	GD	Pts	Qualification
1	Brazil	3	3	0	0	10	0	+10	9	Advance to knockout stage
2	China (H)	3	2	0	1	5	6	−1	6	Advance to knockout stage
3	Denmark	3	1	0	2	4	4	0	3	
4	New Zealand	3	0	0	3	0	9	−9	0	

Source: FIFA
(H) Hosts
12 September 2007
17:00

New Zealand	0–5	Brazil
	Report	Daniela 10'; Cristiane 54'; Marta 74', 90+3'; Renata Costa 86'

Wuhan Sports Centre Stadium, Wuhan
Attendance: 50,800
Referee: Pannipar Kamnueng (Thailand)

15 September 2007
17:00

Denmark	2–0	New Zealand
K. Pedersen 61'; Sørensen 66'	Report

Wuhan Sports Centre Stadium, Wuhan
Attendance: 54,000
Referee: Mayumi Oiwa (Japan)

20 September 2007
20:00

China	2–0	New Zealand
Li Jie 57'; Xie Caixia 79'	Report

Tianjin Olympic Center Stadium, Tianjin
Attendance: 55,832
Referee: Dagmar Damková (Czech Republic)

== 2011 FIFA Women's World Cup ==
At the following World Cup which was held in Germany, New Zealand once again qualified through as the champions of the OFC Women's Championships. After scoring thirty-one goals in the group stage against Vanuatu, Cook Islands and Tahiti, they finished top of the group. In the semi-final they defeated the Solomon Islands 8–0 before defeating Papua New Guinea 11–0 in the final.

At the World Cup, New Zealand was drawn in Group B with England, Japan and Mexico. The first match in the 2011 World Cup was against Japan in Bochum. After conceding the opening goal in the sixth minute from Yūki Nagasato, New Zealand equalized from a goal from Amber Hearn which was the first goal in twenty years. Aya Miyama scored the winner in the 68th minute to give Japan a 2–1 win. Their following match against England saw New Zealand take the lead in the 18th minute from a Sarah Gregorius goal. Two goals in the second half from Jill Scott and Jessica Clarke gave England the three points.

The final match of the group saw New Zealand fall behind early with two goals in thirty minutes with Stephany Mayor and Maribel Domínguez securing those goals. For New Zealand, two late goals in the last few minutes from Rebecca Smith and Hannah Wilkinson gave New Zealand their first World Cup point after eight consecutive defeats from eight matches.

=== Group B ===
Pos	Team	Pld	W	D	L	GF	GA	GD	Pts	Qualification
1	England	3	2	1	0	5	2	+3	7	Advance to knockout stage
2	Japan	3	2	0	1	6	3	+3	6	Advance to knockout stage
3	Mexico	3	0	2	1	3	7	−4	2	
4	New Zealand	3	0	1	2	4	6	−2	1	

Source: FIFA
27 June 2011
15:00

Japan	2–1	New Zealand
Nagasato 6'; Miyama 68'	Report	Hearn 12'

Ruhrstadion, Bochum
Attendance: 12,538
Referee: Kirsi Heikkinen (Finland)

1 July 2011
18:15

New Zealand	1–2	England
Gregorius 18'	Report	J. Scott 63'; Clarke 81'

Rudolf-Harbig-Stadion, Dresden
Attendance: 19,110
Referee: Thérèse Neguel (Cameroon)

5 July 2011
18:15

New Zealand	2–2	Mexico
Smith 90'; Wilkinson 90+4'	Report	Mayor 2'; Domínguez 29'

Rhein-Neckar-Arena, Sinsheim
Attendance: 20,451
Referee: Jenny Palmqvist (Sweden)

== 2015 FIFA Women's World Cup ==
New Zealand once again made through to the World Cup with the tournament being held in Canada. At the 2014 OFC Women's Nations Cup, New Zealand would take the out their third consecutive Oceania title after they scored thirty goals against Tonga (16–0), Papua New Guinea (3–0) and the Cook Islands (11–0). Amber Hearn was the leading top goalscorer of the tournament with seven goals.

At the World Cup, New Zealand were drawn in Group A with host Canada, China and World Cup newcomer Netherlands. In the opening match held at Edmonton, the Netherlands scored their first World Cup goal from midfielder Lieke Martens in the 33rd minute which was the difference between the two teams on the day. Their following match also in Edmonton saw them take on the hosts. After a thirty-minute delay due to a soggy pitch, the match ended in a 0–0 draw with the best opportunity being in the opening half when Amber Hearn couldn't convert a penalty as it hit the crossbar.

With a win needed in the final match of the group, they took on China in the final match held at Winnipeg. Rebekah Stott scored the opening goal in the 28th minute before a penalty in the 41st minute was converted by Wang Lisi despite replays showing the ball ricocheted off the chest instead of the hand. Wang Shanshan gave China the lead after a mistake from keeper Erin Nayler meant that Shanshan could loft the ball high and into the net. Hannah Wilkinson scored New Zealand's second four minutes later but they couldn't breakthrough the deadlock with the result ending in a two all draw.

=== Group A ===
Pos	Team	Pld	W	D	L	GF	GA	GD	Pts	Qualification
1	Canada (H)	3	1	2	0	2	1	+1	5	Advance to knockout stage
2	China	3	1	1	1	3	3	0	4	Advance to knockout stage
3	Netherlands	3	1	1	1	2	2	0	4	Advance to knockout stage
4	New Zealand	3	0	2	1	2	3	−1	2	

Source: FIFA
(H) Hosts
6 June 2015
19:00 MDT (UTC−6)

New Zealand	0–1	Netherlands
	Report	Martens 33'

Commonwealth Stadium, Edmonton
Attendance: 53,058
Referee: Quetzalli Alvarado (Mexico)

11 June 2015
19:00 MDT (UTC−6)

Canada	0–0	New Zealand
	Report

Commonwealth Stadium, Edmonton
Attendance: 35,544
Referee: Bibiana Steinhaus (Germany)

15 June 2015
18:30 CDT (UTC−5)

China	2–2	New Zealand
Wang Lisi 41' (pen.); Wang Shanshan 60'	Report	Stott 28'; Wilkinson 64'

Investors Group Field, Winnipeg
Attendance: 26,191
Referee: Katalin Kulcsár (Hungary)

== 2019 FIFA Women's World Cup ==
The following edition which was held in France saw New Zealand once again qualify through to the World Cup. This was mainly from their new head coach in Tom Sermanni who was signed as head coach in October 2018. Competing at the 2018 OFC Women's Nations Cup which was also the qualifier for the 2020 Summer Olympics, New Zealand comfortably qualified through the group stage as group winners with 27 goals in three matches against Tonga (11–0), Cook Islands (6–0) and Fiji (10–0). It was during the Fiji match that Ria Percival became the leading international player for New Zealand with their 133rd cap passing Abby Erceg. This was followed by the semi-final win with a 8–0 win over New Caledonia, they would get another 8–0 win in the final against Fiji to book their fifth World Cup appearance.

At the World Cup, New Zealand was placed in Group E with two opponents from the previous World Cup in Canada and the Netherlands with the third opponent being Cameroon who was debuting at the tournament. In the opening match against the Netherlands at Le Havre, a late 92nd-minute goal from Dutch midfielder, Jill Roord gave the Netherlands the three points. This was after New Zealand was simply outplayed in the first half but held firm with a draw at the break. The following match against the Canadians saw New Zealand being dominated by Canada as New Zealand only had two shots for entire game compared to twenty-two from Canada, two of those being goals from Jessie Fleming and Nichelle Prince which saw New Zealand needing to win against Cameroon in the final game. The final match was held at Montpellier and it would be the Ajara Nchout difference with the Cameroon player scoring two goals in the match to give Cameroon the victory. This was despite an own goal Aurelle Awona in the 80th minute which gave New Zealand a shot at a win but it wasn't to be with Cameroon advancing as one of the best third place teams.

=== Group E ===
Pos	Team	Pld	W	D	L	GF	GA	GD	Pts	Qualification
1	Netherlands	3	3	0	0	6	2	+4	9	Advance to knockout stage
2	Canada	3	2	0	1	4	2	+2	6	Advance to knockout stage
3	Cameroon	3	1	0	2	3	5	−2	3	Advance to knockout stage
4	New Zealand	3	0	0	3	1	5	−4	0	

Source: FIFA
11 June 2019
15:00

New Zealand	0–1	Netherlands
	Report	Roord 90+2'

Stade Océane, Le Havre
Attendance: 10,654
Referee: Edina Alves Batista (Brazil)

15 June 2019
21:00

Canada	2–0	New Zealand
Fleming 48'; Prince 79'	Report

Stade des Alpes, Grenoble
Attendance: 14,856
Referee: Yoshimi Yamashita (Japan)

20 June 2019
18:00

Cameroon	2–1	New Zealand
Nchout 57', 90+5'	Report	Awona 80' (o.g.)

Stade de la Mosson, Montpellier
Attendance: 8,009
Referee: Kateryna Monzul (Ukraine)

== 2023 FIFA Women's World Cup ==
New Zealand co-hosted the 2023 FIFA Women's World Cup alongside Australia, the Football Ferns automatically qualified as co-host.

=== Group A ===
Pos	Team	Pld	W	D	L	GF	GA	GD	Pts	Qualification
1	Switzerland	3	1	2	0	2	0	+2	5	Advance to knockout stage
2	Norway	3	1	1	1	6	1	+5	4	Advance to knockout stage
3	New Zealand (H)	3	1	1	1	1	1	0	4	
4	Philippines	3	1	0	2	1	8	−7	3	

Source: FIFA
Rules for classification: Group stage tiebreakers
(H) Hosts
20 July 2023
19:00 UTC+12

New Zealand	1–0	Norway
Wilkinson 48'	Report

Eden Park, Auckland
Attendance: 42,137
Referee: Yoshimi Yamashita (Japan)

25 July 2023
17:30 UTC+12

New Zealand	0–1	Philippines
	Report	Bolden 24'

Wellington Regional Stadium, Wellington
Attendance: 32,357
Referee: Katia García (Mexico)

30 July 2023
19:00 UTC+12

Switzerland	0–0	New Zealand
	Report

Forsyth Barr Stadium, Dunedin
Attendance: 25,947
Referee: Tori Penso (United States)

== FIFA World Cup record ==
Year	Result	Position	Pld	W	D	L	GF	GA
(China) 1991	Group stage	11th	3	0	0	3	1	11
(Sweden) 1995	Did not qualify							
(United States) 1999	Did not qualify							
(United States) 2003	Did not qualify							
(China) 2007	Group stage	14th	3	0	0	3	0	9
(Germany) 2011	Group stage	12th	3	0	1	2	4	6
(Canada) 2015	Group stage	19th	3	0	2	1	2	3
(France) 2019	Group stage	20th	3	0	0	3	1	5
(Australia) (New Zealand) 2023	Group stage	20th	3	1	1	1	1	1
(Brazil) 2027	Qualified							
(Costa Rica) (Jamaica) (Mexico) (United States) 2031	To be determined							
(United Kingdom) 2035	To be determined							
Total	Group stage		18	1	4	13	9	35

== Record ==
FIFA Women's World Cup history
Year	Round	Date	Opponent	Result	Stadium
(China) 1991	Group stage	17 November	Denmark	L 0–3	Tianhe Stadium, Guangzhou
(China) 1991	Group stage	19 November	Norway	L 0–4	Guangdong Provincial Stadium, Guangzhou
(China) 1991	Group stage	21 November	China	L 1–4	New Plaza Stadium, Foshan
(China) 2007	Group stage	12 September	Brazil	L 0–5	Wuhan Stadium, Wuhan
(China) 2007	Group stage	15 September	Denmark	L 0–2	Wuhan Stadium, Wuhan
(China) 2007	Group stage	20 September	China	L 0–2	Tianjin Olympic Centre Stadium, Tianjin
(Germany) 2011	Group stage	27 June	Japan	L 1–2	Ruhrstadion, Bochum
(Germany) 2011	Group stage	1 July	England	L 1–2	Rudolf-Harbig-Stadion, Dresden
(Germany) 2011	Group stage	5 July	Mexico	D 2–2	Rhein-Neckar-Arena, Sinsheim
(Canada) 2015	Group stage	6 June	Netherlands	L 0–1	Commonwealth Stadium, Edmonton
(Canada) 2015	Group stage	11 June	Canada	D 0–0	Commonwealth Stadium, Edmonton
(Canada) 2015	Group stage	15 June	China	D 2–2	Winnipeg Stadium, Winnipeg
(France) 2019	Group stage	11 June	Netherlands	L 0–1	Stade Océane, Le Havre
(France) 2019	Group stage	15 June	Canada	L 0–2	Stade des Alpes, Grenoble
(France) 2019	Group stage	20 June	Cameroon	L 1–2	Stade de la Mosson, Montpellier
(Australia) / (New Zealand) 2023	Group stage	20 July	Norway	W 1–0	Eden Park, Auckland
(Australia) / (New Zealand) 2023	Group stage	25 July	Philippines	L 0–1	Wellington Regional Stadium, Wellington
(Australia) / (New Zealand) 2023	Group stage	30 July	Switzerland	D 0–0	Forsyth Barr Stadium, Dunedin

== Head-to-head record ==
Opponent	Pld	W	D	L	GF	GA	GD	Win %
Brazil	1	0	0	1	0	5	−5	0.00
Cameroon	1	0	0	1	1	2	−1	0.00
Canada	2	0	1	1	0	2	−2	0.00
China	3	0	1	2	3	8	−5	0.00
Denmark	2	0	0	2	0	5	−5	0.00
England	1	0	0	1	1	2	−1	0.00
Japan	1	0	0	1	1	2	−1	0.00
Mexico	1	0	1	0	2	2	+0	0.00
Netherlands	2	0	0	2	0	2	−2	0.00
Norway	2	1	0	1	1	4	−3	50.00
Philippines	1	0	0	1	0	1	−1	0.00
Switzerland	1	0	1	0	0	0	+0	0.00
Total	18	1	4	13	9	35	−26	5.56

== Goalscorers ==
Player	Goals	1991	2007	2011	2015	2019	2023	2027
Hannah Wilkinson	3			1	1		1	
Sarah Gregorius	1			1				
Amber Hearn	1			1				
Kim Nye	1	1						
Rebecca Smith	1			1				
Rebekah Stott	1				1			
Own goals	1					1		
Total	9	1	0	4	2	1	1	

Own goals scored for opponents

- Terry McCahill (scored for Norway in 1991)
