= Switzerland at the UEFA Women's Championship =

Switzerland have participated 3 times at the UEFA Women's Championship: Their best achievement is reaching the UEFA Women's Championships quarter final in (2025), in which was the host.

== UEFA Women's Championship ==
UEFA Women's Championship record								Qualifying record							
Year	Result	GP	W	D*	L	GF	GA	GP	W	D*	L	GF	GA	P/R	Rnk
(England) (Italy) (Norway) (Sweden) 1984	Did not qualify							6	1	3	2	4	6	–	
(Norway) 1987	Did not qualify							6	1	1	4	5	11	–	
(West Germany) 1989	Did not qualify							6	1	1	4	4	28	–	
(Denmark) 1991	Did not qualify							6	1	1	4	3	17	–	
(Italy) 1993	Did not qualify							4	0	1	3	0	17	–	
(England) (Germany) (Norway) (Sweden) 1995	Did not qualify							6	2	1	3	9	23	–	
(Norway) (Sweden) 1997	Did not qualify							8	5	1	2	21	10	–	
(Germany) 2001	Did not qualify							8	1	2	5	2	12	–	
(England) 2005	Did not qualify							8	1	2	5	2	13	–	
(Finland) 2009	Did not qualify							8	3	2	3	9	16	–	
(Sweden) 2013	Did not qualify							10	5	0	5	29	24	–	
(Netherlands) 2017	Group Stage	3	1	1	1	3	3	8	8	0	0	34	3	–	
(England) 2022	Group Stage	3	0	1	2	4	8	10	6	3	1	22	8	–	
(Switzerland) 2025	Quarter–final	4	1	1	2	4	5	6 (Note: Switzerland qualified automatically as hosts. However they still participated in the qualifying competition, which from Euro 2025 onwards is linked to the Women's Nations League where teams are divided into leagues with promotion/relegation between the leagues at the end of each cycle.)	5	0	1	14	3	▲	19th
(Germany) 2029															
Total	3/14	10	2	3	5	11	16	100	40	18	42	158	191	19th	

*Draws include knockout matches decided on penalty kicks.

== Head-to-head record ==
Opponent	Pld	W	D	L	GF	GA	GD	Win %
Austria	1	0	0	1	0	1	−1	0.00
Finland	1	0	1	0	1	1	+0	0.00
France	1	0	1	0	1	1	+0	0.00
Iceland	2	2	0	0	4	1	+3	100.00
Netherlands	1	0	0	1	1	4	−3	0.00
Norway	1	0	0	1	1	2	−1	0.00
Portugal	1	0	1	0	2	2	+0	0.00
Spain	1	0	0	1	0	2	−2	0.00
Sweden	1	0	0	1	1	2	−1	0.00
Total	10	2	3	5	11	16	−5	20.00
