= Poland at the UEFA Women's Championship =

Poland UEFA Women's

Poland have participated once at the UEFA Women's Championship. The best achievement is the group stage.

== UEFA Women's Championship ==
UEFA Women's Euro record									Qualification record							
Year	Result	Pos	Pld	W	D *	L	GF	GA	Pld	W	D	L	GF	GA	P/R	Rnk
1984	Did not enter								Did not enter							
(Norway) 1987	Did not enter								Did not enter							
(West Germany) 1989	Did not enter								Did not enter							
(Denmark) 1991	Did not qualify								4	0	0	4	2	11	—	
(Italy) 1993	Did not qualify								4	0	0	4	3	12	—	
(Germany) 1995	Did not qualify								6	0	1	5	2	15	—	
(Norway) (Sweden) 1997	Did not qualify								6	3	0	3	22	9	—	
(Germany) 2001	Did not qualify								6	3	2	1	16	11	—	
(England) 2005	Did not qualify								8	0	2	6	7	36	—	
(Finland) 2009	Did not qualify								8	2	1	5	11	20	—	
(Sweden) 2013	Did not qualify								10	5	2	3	17	11	—	
(Netherlands) 2017	Did not qualify								8	3	1	4	10	16	—	
(England) 2022	Did not qualify								8	4	2	2	16	5	—	
(Switzerland) 2025	Group stage	12th	3	1	0	2	3	7	10	4	0	6	12	19	▼ (Note: From Euro 2025 onwards a new qualifying format was introduced, linked to the Women's Nations League where teams are divided into leagues with promotion/relegation between the leagues at the end of each cycle.)	16th
(Germany) 2029																
Total	1/14	TBD	3	1	0	2	3	7	74	24	11	39	116	154	16th	

== Head-to-head record ==
Opponent	Pld	W	D	L	GF	GA	GD	Win %
Denmark	1	1	0	0	3	2	+1	100.00
Germany	1	0	0	1	0	2	−2	0.00
Sweden	1	0	0	1	0	3	−3	0.00
Total	3	1	0	2	3	7	−4	33.33
