= UEFA Women's Euro 1993 final =

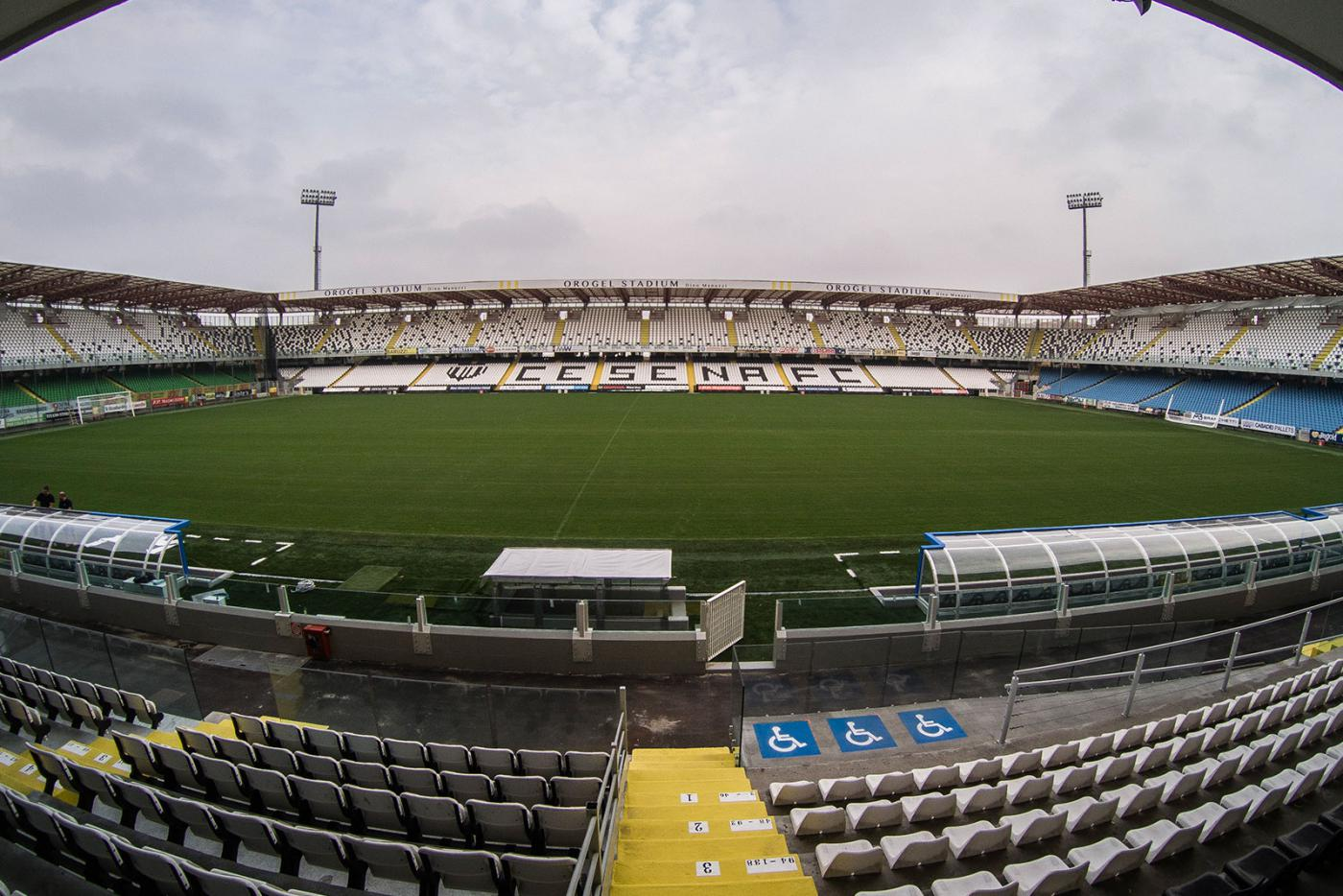
- Stadio Dino Manuzzi, Cesena, Italy, where the final was held (pictured here in 2019)
- Event: UEFA Women's Euro 1993
Italy	Norway
(Italy)	(Norway)
0	1
- Date: 4 July 1993
- Venue: Stadio Dino Manuzzi, Cesena, Italy
- Referee: Alfred Wieser (Austria)

The final of UEFA Women's Euro 1993 was held on 4 July 1993 at Stadio Dino Manuzzi, Cesena, Italy. Norway won the tournament, beating Italy 1-0.

== Final ==
4 July 1993

Italy	0–1	Norway
	NFF Report (in Norwegian); FIGC Report (in Italian); Report	Hegstad 75'

Stadio Dino Manuzzi
Attendance: 7,000
Referee: Alfred Wieser (Austria)
