= David Boardman =

David Boardman may refer to:

- Dave Boardman, football manager
- David Sherman Boardman (1768–1864), American lawyer, judge, and state assemblyman
