= Mette Nielsen =

Mette Nielsen may refer to:

- Mette Nielsen (footballer) (born 1964), Danish footballer
- Mette Nielsen (swimmer) (born 1975), Danish swimmer
