= List of UEFA European Championship penalty shoot-outs =

This is a list of all penalty shoot-outs that have occurred in the final tournaments of the UEFA European Championship.

== Complete list ==
Key

- (penalty scored) = scored penalty
- (penalty missed) = missed penalty
- golden background = scored penalty which ended the shoot-out
- red background = missed penalty which ended the shoot-out
- grey background = first penalty in the shoot-out
- horizontal line within a list of takers = beginning of the sudden death stage

Penalty shoot-outs in the UEFA European Championship
No.	Edition	Round	Winners	F	Losers	Penalties			Winning team		Losing team		Date	Venue	
No.	Edition	Round	Winners	F	Losers	S	M	T	GK	Takers	Takers	GK	Date	City	Stadium
1.	1976, Yugoslavia	Final	Czechoslovakia	2–2	West Germany	5–3	0–1	5–4	Viktor	Masný (penalty scored); Nehoda (penalty scored); Ondruš (penalty scored); Jurkemik (penalty scored); Panenka (penalty scored)	(penalty scored) Bonhof; (penalty scored) Flohe; (penalty scored) Bongartz; (penalty missed) Hoeneß	Maier	20 June 1976	Belgrade	Red Star
2.	1980, Italy	3rd place play-off	Czechoslovakia	1–1 (Note: No extra time was played.)	Italy	9–8	0–1	9–9	Netolička	Masný (penalty scored); Nehoda (penalty scored); Ondruš (penalty scored); Jurkemik (penalty scored); Panenka (penalty scored) Gögh (penalty scored); Gajdůšek (penalty scored); Kozák (penalty scored); Barmoš (penalty scored)	(penalty scored) Causio; (penalty scored) Altobelli; (penalty scored) G. Baresi; (penalty scored) Cabrini; (penalty scored) Benetti (penalty scored) Graziani; (penalty scored) Scirea; (penalty scored) Tardelli; (penalty missed) Collovati	Zoff	21 June 1980	Naples	San Paolo
3.	1984, France	Semi-finals	Spain	1–1	Denmark	5–4	0–1	5–5	Arconada	Santillana (penalty scored); Señor (penalty scored); Urquiaga (penalty scored); Víctor (penalty scored); Sarabia (penalty scored)	(penalty scored) Brylle; (penalty scored) J. Olsen; (penalty scored) Laudrup; (penalty scored) Lerby; (penalty missed) Elkjær	Qvist	24 June 1984	Lyon	Gerland
4.	1992, Sweden	Semi-finals	Denmark	2–2	Netherlands	5–4	0–1	5–5	Schmeichel	Larsen (penalty scored); Povlsen (penalty scored); Elstrup (penalty scored); Vilfort (penalty scored); Christofte (penalty scored)	(penalty scored) Koeman; (penalty missed) Van Basten; (penalty scored) Bergkamp; (penalty scored) Rijkaard; (penalty scored) Witschge	Van Breukelen	22 June 1992	Gothenburg	Ullevi
5.	1996, England	Quarter-finals	England	0–0	Spain	4–2	0–2	4–4	Seaman	Shearer (penalty scored); Platt (penalty scored); Pearce (penalty scored); Gascoigne (penalty scored)	(penalty missed) Hierro; (penalty scored) Amor; (penalty scored) Belsué; (penalty missed) Nadal	Zubizarreta	22 June 1996	London	Wembley
6.	1996, England	Quarter-finals	France	0–0	Netherlands	5–4	0–1	5–5	Lama	Zidane (penalty scored); Djorkaeff (penalty scored); Lizarazu (penalty scored); Guérin (penalty scored); Blanc (penalty scored)	(penalty scored) De Kock; (penalty scored) R. de Boer; (penalty scored) Kluivert; (penalty missed) Seedorf; (penalty scored) Blind	Van der Sar	22 June 1996	Liverpool	Anfield
7.	1996, England	Semi-finals	Czech Republic	0–0	France	6–5	0–1	6–6	Kouba	Kubík (penalty scored); Nedvěd (penalty scored); Berger (penalty scored); Poborský (penalty scored); Rada (penalty scored) Kadlec (penalty scored)	(penalty scored) Zidane; (penalty scored) Djorkaeff; (penalty scored) Lizarazu; (penalty scored) Guérin; (penalty scored) Blanc (penalty missed) Pedros	Lama	26 June 1996	Manchester	Old Trafford
8.	1996, England	Semi-finals	Germany	1–1	England	6–5	0–1	6–6	Köpke	Häßler (penalty scored); Strunz (penalty scored); Reuter (penalty scored); Ziege (penalty scored); Kuntz (penalty scored) Möller (penalty scored)	(penalty scored) Shearer; (penalty scored) Platt; (penalty scored) Pearce; (penalty scored) Gascoigne; (penalty scored) Sheringham (penalty missed) Southgate	Seaman	26 June 1996	London	Wembley
9.	2000, Belgium & Netherlands	Semi-finals	Italy	0–0	Netherlands	3–1	1–3	4–4	Toldo	Di Biagio (penalty scored); Pessotto (penalty scored); Totti (penalty scored); Maldini (penalty missed)	(penalty missed) F. de Boer; (penalty missed) Stam; (penalty scored) Kluivert; (penalty missed) Bosvelt	Van der Sar	29 June 2000	Amsterdam	Amsterdam Arena
10.	2004, Portugal	Quarter-finals	Portugal	2–2	England	6–5	1–2	7–7	Ricardo	Deco (penalty scored); Simão (penalty scored); Rui Costa (penalty missed); Ronaldo (penalty scored); Maniche (penalty scored) Postiga (penalty scored); Ricardo (penalty scored)	(penalty missed) Beckham; (penalty scored) Owen; (penalty scored) Lampard; (penalty scored) Terry; (penalty scored) Hargreaves (penalty scored) A. Cole; (penalty missed) Vassell	James	24 June 2004	Lisbon	Da Luz
11.	2004, Portugal	Quarter-finals	Netherlands	0–0	Sweden	5–4	1–2	6–6	Van der Sar	Van Nistelrooy (penalty scored); Heitinga (penalty scored); Reiziger (penalty scored); Cocu (penalty missed); Makaay (penalty scored) Robben (penalty scored)	(penalty scored) Källström; (penalty scored) Larsson; (penalty missed) Ibrahimović; (penalty scored) Ljungberg; (penalty scored) Wilhelmsson (penalty missed) Mellberg	Isaksson	26 June 2004	Faro/Loulé	Algarve
12.	2008, Austria & Switzerland	Quarter-finals	Turkey	1–1	Croatia	3–1	0–3	3–4	Reçber	Turan (penalty scored); Şentürk (penalty scored); Altıntop (penalty scored)	(penalty missed) Modrić; (penalty scored) Srna; (penalty missed) Rakitić; (penalty missed) Petrić	Pletikosa	20 June 2008	Vienna	Happel
13.	2008, Austria & Switzerland	Quarter-finals	Spain	0–0	Italy	4–2	1–2	5–4	Casillas	Villa (penalty scored); Cazorla (penalty scored); Senna (penalty scored); Güiza (penalty missed); Fàbregas (penalty scored)	(penalty scored) Grosso; (penalty missed) De Rossi; (penalty scored) Camoranesi; (penalty missed) Di Natale	Buffon	22 June 2008	Vienna	Happel
14.	2012, Poland & Ukraine	Quarter-finals	Italy	0–0	England	4–2	1–2	5–4	Buffon	Balotelli (penalty scored); Montolivo (penalty missed); Pirlo (penalty scored); Nocerino (penalty scored); Diamanti (penalty scored)	(penalty scored) Gerrard; (penalty scored) Rooney; (penalty missed) Young; (penalty missed) A. Cole	Hart	24 June 2012	Kyiv	Olympic St.
15.	2012, Poland & Ukraine	Semi-finals	Spain	0–0	Portugal	4–2	1–2	5–4	Casillas	Alonso (penalty missed); Iniesta (penalty scored); Piqué (penalty scored); Ramos (penalty scored); Fàbregas (penalty scored)	(penalty missed) Moutinho; (penalty scored) Pepe; (penalty scored) Nani; (penalty missed) Alves	Patrício	27 June 2012	Donetsk	Donbas
16.	2016, France	Round of 16	Poland	1–1	Switzerland	5–4	0–1	5–5	Fabiański	Lewandowski (penalty scored); Milik (penalty scored); Glik (penalty scored); Błaszczykowski (penalty scored); Krychowiak (penalty scored)	(penalty scored) Lichtsteiner; (penalty missed) Xhaka; (penalty scored) Shaqiri; (penalty scored) Schär; (penalty scored) Rodríguez	Sommer	25 June 2016	Saint-Étienne	Geoffroy-Guichard
17.	2016, France	Quarter-finals	Portugal	1–1	Poland	5–3	0–1	5–4	Patrício	Ronaldo (penalty scored); Sanches (penalty scored); Moutinho (penalty scored); Nani (penalty scored); Quaresma (penalty scored)	(penalty scored) Lewandowski; (penalty scored) Milik; (penalty scored) Glik; (penalty missed) Błaszczykowski	Fabiański	30 June 2016	Marseille	Vélodrome
18.	2016, France	Quarter-finals	Germany	1–1	Italy	6–5	3–4	9–9	Neuer	Kroos (penalty scored); Müller (penalty missed); Özil (penalty missed); Draxler (penalty scored); Schweinsteiger (penalty missed) Hummels (penalty scored); Kimmich (penalty scored); Boateng (penalty scored); Hector (penalty scored)	(penalty scored) Insigne; (penalty missed) Zaza; (penalty scored) Barzagli; (penalty missed) Pellè; (penalty missed) Bonucci (penalty scored) Giaccherini; (penalty scored) Parolo; (penalty scored) De Sciglio; (penalty missed) Darmian	Buffon	2 July 2016	Bordeaux	Nouveau Stade)
19.	2020, Pan-European	Round of 16	Switzerland	3–3	France	5–4	0–1	5–5	Sommer	Gavranović (penalty scored); Schär (penalty scored); Akanji (penalty scored); Vargas (penalty scored); Mehmedi (penalty scored)	(penalty scored) Pogba; (penalty scored) Giroud; (penalty scored) Thuram; (penalty scored) Kimpembe; (penalty missed) Mbappé	Lloris	28 June 2021	Bucharest	Arena Națională
20.	2020, Pan-European	Quarter-finals	Spain	1–1	Switzerland	3–1	2–3	5–4	Simón	Busquets (penalty missed); Olmo (penalty scored); Rodri (penalty missed); Gerard (penalty scored); Oyarzabal (penalty scored)	(penalty scored) Gavranović; (penalty missed) Schär; (penalty missed) Akanji; (penalty missed) Vargas	Sommer	2 July 2021	Saint Petersburg	Krestovsky
21.	2020, Pan-European	Semi-finals	Italy	1–1	Spain	4–2	1–2	5–4	Donnarumma	Locatelli (penalty missed); Belotti (penalty scored); Bonucci (penalty scored); Bernardeschi (penalty scored); Jorginho (penalty scored)	(penalty missed) Olmo; (penalty scored) Gerard; (penalty scored) Thiago; (penalty missed) Morata	Simón	6 July 2021	London	Wembley
22.	2020, Pan-European	Final	Italy	1–1	England	3–2	2–3	5–5	Donnarumma	Berardi (penalty scored); Belotti (penalty missed); Bonucci (penalty scored); Bernardeschi (penalty scored); Jorginho (penalty missed)	(penalty scored) Kane; (penalty scored) Maguire; (penalty missed) Rashford; (penalty missed) Sancho; (penalty missed) Saka	Pickford	11 July 2021	London	Wembley
23.	2024, Germany	Round of 16	Portugal	0–0	Slovenia	3–0	0–3	3–3	Costa	Ronaldo (penalty scored); Fernandes (penalty scored); B. Silva (penalty scored)	(penalty missed) Iličić; (penalty missed) Balkovec; (penalty missed) Verbič	Oblak	1 July 2024	Frankfurt	Waldstadion
24.	2024, Germany	Quarter-finals	France	0–0	Portugal	5–3	0–1	5–4	Maignan	Dembélé (penalty scored); Fofana (penalty scored); Koundé (penalty scored); Barcola (penalty scored); Hernandez (penalty scored)	(penalty scored) Ronaldo; (penalty scored) B. Silva; (penalty missed) Félix; (penalty scored) Mendes	Costa	5 July 2024	Hamburg	Volksparkstadion
25.	2024, Germany	Quarter-finals	England	1–1	Switzerland	5–3	0–1	5–4	Pickford	Palmer (penalty scored); Bellingham (penalty scored); Saka (penalty scored); Toney (penalty scored); Alexander-Arnold (penalty scored)	(penalty missed) Akanji; (penalty scored) Schär; (penalty scored) Shaqiri; (penalty scored) Amdouni	Sommer	6 July 2024	Düsseldorf	Merkur Spiel-Arena

== Statistics ==
Key

- † = shoot-out in the final
- **Bold** = winners that year

=== Shoot-out records ===
Most shoot-outs in a tournament

- **4** – 1996, 2020

Fewest shoot-outs in a tournament (since 1976)

- **0** – 1988

Most played shoot-out

- **2** – Spain vs Italy (2008, 2020)
- **2** – Italy vs England (2012, 2020†)

Most penalties taken in a shoot-out

- **18** – Czechoslovakia vs Italy (1980)
- **18** – Germany vs Italy (2016)

Fewest penalties taken in a shoot-out

- **6** – Portugal vs Slovenia (2024)

Most penalties scored in a shoot-out

- **17** – Czechoslovakia vs Italy (1980)

Most consecutive scored in a shoot-out

- **17** – Czechoslovakia vs Italy (1980)

Fewest penalties scored in a shoot-out

- **3** – Portugal vs Slovenia (2024)

Most penalties missed in a shoot-out

- **7** – Germany vs Italy (2016)

Most consecutive misses in a shoot-out

- **3** – Switzerland vs Spain (2020)
- **3** – England vs Italy (2020†)

=== Team records ===
Most shoot-outs played

- **7** – Italy (1980, 2000, 2008, 2012, 2016, **2020†**x2)

Most shoot-outs played in a tournament

- **2** – France (1996) 1/1
- **2** – England (1996) 1/1
- **2** – Poland (2016) 1/1
- **2** – Switzerland (2020) 1/1
- **2** – Spain (2020) 1/1
- **2** – Italy **(2020†) 2/0**
- **2** – Portugal (2024) 1/1

Most shoot-out wins

- **4** – Spain (1984, **2008**, **2012**, 2020)
- **4** – Italy (2000, 2012, **2020†**×2)

Most shoot-out wins in a tournament

- **2** – Italy (**2020†**)

Most shoot-out losses

- **4** – England (1996, 2004, 2012, 2020†)

Most consecutive shoot-out wins

- **3** – Czech Republic (**1976†**^{1}, 1980^{1}, 1996)
- **3** – Spain (**2008**, **2012**, 2020)

Most consecutive shoot-out losses

- **4** – England (1996, 2004, 2012, 2020†)

Most shoot-out wins without losses

- **3** – Czech Republic (**1976†**^{1}, 1980^{1}, 1996)

Most shoot-out losses without wins

- **1** – Sweden (2004)
- **1** – Croatia (2008)
- **1** – Slovenia (2024)

Fewest penalties scored in a shoot-out

- **0** – Slovenia (2024)

Most penalties scored in a shoot-out

- **9** – Czech Republic (1980^{1})

Most penalties missed in a shoot-out

- **4** – Italy (2016)

Most knockout matches played without shoot-outs (since 1976)

- **6** – Belgium (1980, 2016×2, 2020×2, 2024)

=== Taker records ===
Most participations in shoot-outs

- **4** – (Portugal) Cristiano Ronaldo (2004, **2016**, 2024x2)
- **4** – (Switzerland) Fabian Schär (2016, 2020x2, 2024)

Most penalties scored in shoot-outs

- **4** – (Portugal) Cristiano Ronaldo (2004, **2016**, 2024x2)

Most penalties missed in shoot-outs

- **2** – (Switzerland) Manuel Akanji (2020, 2024)

Most penalties scored in one tournament

- **2** – (France) Zinedine Zidane (1996)
- **2** – (France) Youri Djorkaeff (1996)
- **2** – (France) Bixente Lizarazu (1996)
- **2** – (France) Vincent Guérin (1996)
- **2** – (France) Laurent Blanc (1996)
- **2** – (England) Alan Shearer (1996)
- **2** – (England) David Platt (1996)
- **2** – (England) Stuart Pearce (1996)
- **2** – (England) Paul Gascoigne (1996)
- **2** – (Poland) Robert Lewandowski (2016)
- **2** – (Poland) Arkadiusz Milik (2016)
- **2** – (Poland) Kamil Glik (2016)
- **2** – (Switzerland) Mario Gavranović (2020)
- **2** – (Spain) Gerard Moreno (2020)
- **2** – (Italy) Leonardo Bonucci (2020)
- **2** – (Italy) Federico Bernardeschi (2020)
- **2** – (Portugal) Cristiano Ronaldo (2024)
- **2** – (Portugal) Bernardo Silva (2024)

Most deciding final penalties scored in shoot-outs

- **2** – (Spain) Cesc Fàbregas (**2008**, **2012**)

=== Goalkeeper records ===
Most participations in shoot-outs

- **4** – (Switzerland) Yann Sommer (2016, 2020×2, 2024)

Most penalties faced in shoot-outs

- **20** – (Switzerland) Yann Sommer

Most penalties conceded in shoot-outs

- **17** – (Switzerland) Yann Sommer

Most penalties missed against (saves and off-target shots) in shoot-outs

- **6** – (Italy) Gianluigi Buffon

Most penalties saved in shoot-outs

- **3** – (Italy) Gianluigi Buffon (1 vs Spain in 2008, 1 vs England in 2012 and 1 vs Germany in 2016)
- **3** – (Spain) Iker Casillas (2 vs Italy in 2008 and 1 vs Portugal in 2012)
- **3** – (Spain) Unai Simón (2 vs Switzerland in 2020 and 1 vs Italy in 2020)
- **3** – (Italy) Gianluigi Donnarumma (1 vs Spain in 2020 and 2 vs England in 2020)
- **3** – (Portugal) Diogo Costa (3 vs Slovenia in 2024)
- **3** – (England) Jordan Pickford (2 vs Italy in 2020, 1 vs Switzerland in 2024)

Most penalties saved in single tournament and single shoot-out

- **3** – (Portugal) Diogo Costa (vs Slovenia in 2024)

=== By team ===
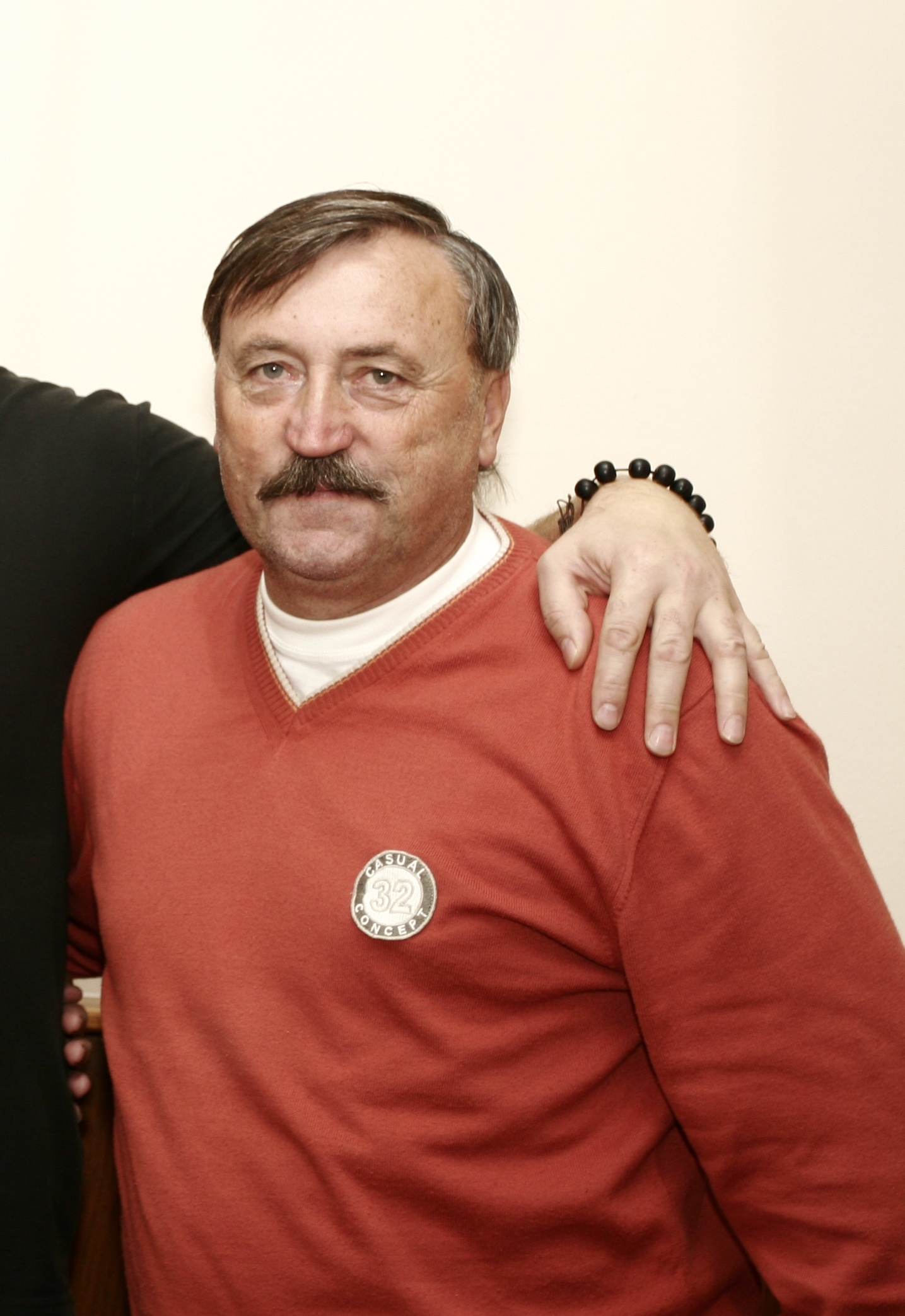
Antonín Panenka, scorer of the winning penalty for Czechoslovakia in the final in 1976

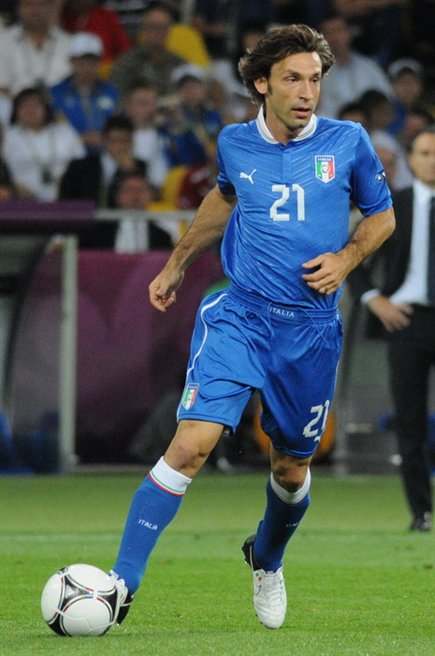
Andrea Pirlo, who scored for Italy against England in 2012

Team	Played	Won	Lost	Win %	Years won	Years lost	S	A	S %
Czech Republic	3	3	0	100%	**1976†**^{1}, 1980^{1}, 1996	–	20	20	100%
Turkey	1	1	0	100%	2008	–	3	3	100%
Spain	6	4	2	67%	1984, **2008**, **2012**, 2020	1996, 2020	20	28	71.4%
Germany	3	2	1	67%	**1996**, 2016	1976†^{3}	15	19	78.9%
Portugal	5	3	2	60%	2004, **2016**, 2024	2012, 2024	19	23	82.6%
Italy	7	4	3	57%	2000, 2012, **2020†**×2	1980, 2008, 2016	29	41	70.7%
France	4	2	2	50%	1996, 2024	1996, 2020	19	21	90.5%
Denmark	2	1	1	50%	**1992**	1984	9	10	90.0%
Poland	2	1	1	50%	2016	2016	8	9	88.9%
England	6	2	4	33%	1996, 2024	1996, 2004, 2012, 2020†	23	31	74.2%
Switzerland	4	1	3	25%	2020	2016, 2020, 2024	13	18	72.2%
Netherlands	4	1	3	25%	2004	1992, 1996, 2000	14	20	70.0%
Sweden	1	0	1	0%	–	2004	4	6	66.7%
Croatia	1	0	1	0%	–	2008	1	4	25.0%
Slovenia	1	0	1	0%	–	2024	0	3	0%

Championship year in bold

Notes

- ^{1} Participated as Czechoslovakia
- ^{2} Participated as Soviet Union
- ^{3} Participated as West Germany

=== By year ===
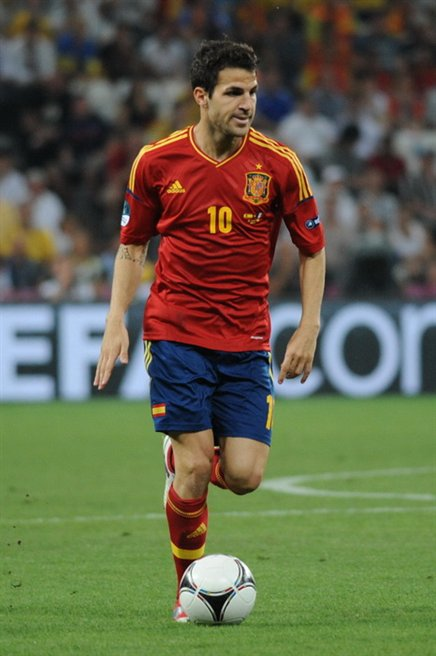
Cesc Fàbregas, scorer of winning penalties for Spain in shoot-outs in two different tournaments (2008 and 2012)

- Penalty shoot-outs were introduced to the UEFA European Championship in 1976.
- Before 1976, there were **17** matches during the first four tournaments from 1960 to 1972: **16** scheduled matches ( four per tournament ) and **1** replay match. Only **2** of those matches were not decided within 120 minutes. The Euro 1968 semi-final between Italy and the Soviet Union was decided by coin toss. When the Euro 1968 final between Italy and Yugoslavia was level after 120 minutes, a replay was scheduled instead of a coin toss. Both the semi-final coin toss and the final replay were won by Italy, the hosts.
- Since 2004, if only two teams finish the group stage with the same record (points as well as goals scored and conceded), and they drew against each other on the final matchday, a penalty shoot-out would be used to determine their final ranking. However, no such instance has yet occurred.

Year	Teams	Knockout matches	Shoot-outs	Penalty %	Penalties scored	Penalty attempts	Score %
1976	4	4	1	25.0%	8	9	88.9%
1980	8	2	1	50.0%	17	18	**94.4%**
1984	8	3	1	33.3%	9	10	90.0%
1988	8	3	0	0.0%	—	—	—
1992	8	3	1	33.3%	9	10	90.0%
1996	16	7	**4**	**57.1%**	**37**	**42**	88.1%
2000	16	7	1	14.3%	4	8	50.0%
2004	16	7	2	28.6%	20	26	76.9%
2008	16	7	2	28.6%	10	16	62.5%
2012	16	7	2	28.6%	12	18	66.7%
2016	24	15	3	20.0%	28	37	75.7%
2020	24	15	**4**	26.6%	24	38	63.1%
2024	24	15	3	20.0%	19	24	79.2%
Total		95	25	26.3%	197	256	76.9%

Highest and lowest numbers in bold.

== See also ==
- List of Copa América penalty shoot-outs
- List of FIFA World Cup penalty shoot-outs
- List of FIFA Women's World Cup penalty shoot-outs
- List of UEFA Women's European Championship penalty shoot-outs
