= UEFA Women's Euro 1991 =

Europamesterskabet i fodbold for kvinder 1991

Tournament details
- Host country: Denmark
- Dates: 10–14 July
- Teams: 4
- Venue: 3 (in 3 host cities)

Final positions
- Champions: Germany (2nd title)
- Runners-up: Norway
- Third place: Denmark
- Fourth place: Italy

Tournament statistics
- Matches played: 4
- Goals scored: 10 (2.5 per match)
- Attendance: 16,950 (4,238 per match)
- Top scorer: (Germany) Heidi Mohr (4 goals)
- Best player: (Germany) Silvia Neid

The 1991 UEFA Women's Championship took place in Denmark. It was won by Germany for the second time and the first since the reunification in 1990 in a final against Norway in a repeat of the previous edition's final. Eighteen teams entered qualifying, which was enough to make the competition the first fully official one, so the name was changed to the UEFA Women's Championship.

The tournament served as the European qualifying round for the FIFA Women's World Cup 1991.

== Squads ==
For a list of all squads that played in the final tournament, see 1991 UEFA Women's Championship squads

== Bracket ==
Semi-finals
11 July – Frederikshavn
Germany	3
Italy	0
10 July – Hjørring
Norway (p)	0 (8)
Denmark	0 (7)

Final
14 July – Aalborg
Germany (a.e.t.)	3
Norway	1
Third place play-off
14 July – Aalborg
Italy	1
Denmark (a.e.t.)	2

== Semifinals ==
10 July 1991
19:00

Norway	0–0 (a.e.t.)	Denmark
	DBU Report (in Danish); NFF Report (in Norwegian); Report
Penalties
Svensson (penalty scored); Aarønes (penalty missed); Carlsen (penalty scored); Zaborowski (penalty scored); Riise (penalty scored); Medalen (penalty scored); Hegstad (penalty scored); Nyborg (penalty scored); Espeseth (penalty scored)	8–7	(penalty scored) Kolding; (penalty scored) Thychosen; (penalty scored) Sefron; (penalty missed) Jacobsen; (penalty scored) Bagge; (penalty scored) Gam-Pedersen; (penalty scored) Christensen; (penalty scored) J. Hansen; (penalty missed) M. Jensen

Hjørring Stadium, Hjørring
Attendance: 4,850
Referee: Lube Spassov (Bulgaria)

11 July 1991

Germany	3–0	Italy
Mohr 30', 58'; Raith 60'	DFB Report (in German); FIGC Report (in Italian); Report

Frederikshavn Stadion, Frederikshavn
Attendance: 3,000
Referee: Roger Philippi (Luxembourg)

== Third place playoff ==
14 July 1991
12:15

Denmark	2–1 (a.e.t.)	Italy
H. Jensen 22'; Furlotti 95' (o.g.) (Note: The Italian Football Federation attributes the own goal to Emma Iozzelli.)	DBU Report (in Danish); FIGC Report (in Italian); Report	Fiorini 68'

Aalborg Stadion, Aalborg
Attendance: 3,100
Referee: Raul Garcia de Loza (Spain)

== Final ==
14 July 1991

Germany	3–1 (a.e.t.)	Norway
Mohr 62', 100'; Neid 110'	DFB Report (in German); NFF Report (in Norwegian); Report	Hegstad 54'

Aalborg Stadion, Aalborg
Attendance: 6,000
Referee: James McCluskey (Scotland)

== Goalscorers ==
4 goals

- (Germany) Heidi Mohr

1 goal

- (Denmark) Helle Jensen
- (Germany) Sissy Raith
- (Germany) Silvia Neid
- (Italy) Silvia Fiorini
- (Norway) Birthe Hegstad

Own goal

- (Italy) Maura Furlotti (playing against Denmark)
