= Keld Gantzhorn =

Danish footballer and manager (born 1954)

Personal information
- Full name: Keld Gantzhorn Knudsen
- Date of birth: 3 October 1954 (age 72)
- Place of birth: Gamby, Denmark
- Position: Midfielder

Senior career*
Years	Team	Apps	(Gls)
1978	Odense		

Managerial career
- 1988–1996: Denmark Women
- * Club domestic league appearances and goals

Keld Gantzhorn Knudsen (born 3 October 1954) is a Danish former footballer and manager.

== Career ==
Gantzhorn played for Odense, and appeared for the team in the 1978–79 European Cup on 27 September 1978 against Bulgarian club Lokomotiv Sofia, which finished as a 1–2 away loss. He later began coaching, and was the manager of the Denmark women's national team from 1988 until 1996. He coached the team at the 1991 FIFA Women's World Cup, 1995 FIFA Women's World Cup, 1996 Summer Olympics, as well as the 1991 and UEFA Women's Euro 1993.

Under the leadership of Keld Gantzhorn, the team won a bronze medal during the European Championships in Denmark in 1991 by winning 2–1 over Italy in the match of 3–4. place, after losing to Norway in the semifinals after rematch and penalty shootout. Likewise, the team won a bronze medal at the European Championships in Italy in 1993 by beating the defending European champions Germany 3–1. Here too, Denmark had lost the semifinal to Norway 1–0.

In addition to the national coaching job for women, Gantzhorn coached male teams from OB (U-18), Od. KFUM, Næsby and Dalum.

== Personal life ==
Gantzhorn was born in Gamby in the Nordfyn Municipality. He studied to become a teacher, and currently works at the Hjalleseskolen in Odense. He lives in the Dalum district of Odense with his wife Rita, and has four children. He was diagnosed with Parkinson's disease in 2012.
