= Jocelyn Parr =

New Zealand footballer

Personal information
- Full name: Jocelyn Edna Parr
- Date of birth: 5 March 1967 (age 59)
- Place of birth: New Zealand
- Position: Defender

International career
Years	Team	Apps	(Gls)
1991	New Zealand	4	(0)

Jocelyn Edna Parr (born 5 March 1967) is a former New Zealand association football player who represented her country.

Parr made her Football Ferns debut in a 0–0 draw with Australia on 10 October 1991 and ended her international career with 4 caps to her credit.

Parr represented New Zealand at the Women's World Cup finals in China in 1991 playing one group game, a 0–3 loss to Denmark.
