= Leslie King (footballer) =

American-born New Zealand footballer

Personal information
- Full name: Leslie Catherine King
- Date of birth: 13 November 1963 (age 63)
- Place of birth: United States
- Position: Goalkeeper

International career
Years	Team	Apps	(Gls)
1987–1994	New Zealand	28	(0)

Leslie Catherine King (Leslie Moore) (born 13 November 1963) is a former association football player who represented the New Zealand women's national football team.

King made her Football Ferns debut in a 3–0 win over Hawaii on 12 December 1987 and ended her international career with 28 caps to her credit. At the time of the 1991 OFC Women's Championship, the New Zealanders reckoned King to be the best active female goalkeeper in the world.

King represented New Zealand at the Women's World Cup finals in China in 1991, playing all three group games.

== Softball ==
King played softball at University for the Cal State Fullerton Titans from 1982 to 1985 and represented the United States women's national softball team on their tour of China in 1985. She moved to New Zealand to play soccer and also continued her softball career with the New Zealand women's national softball team. She was team captain when she was dropped from the team for the Softball at the 2000 Summer Olympics tournament.
