= Cinnamon Chaney =

New Zealand footballer

Personal information
- Full name: Cinnamon June Chaney
- Date of birth: 10 January 1969 (age 57)
- Place of birth: New Zealand
- Position: Defender

International career
Years	Team	Apps	(Gls)
1987–1995	New Zealand	29	(2)

Cinnamon June Chaney (born 10 January 1969) is a former association football player who represented New Zealand at international level.

Chaney made her Football Ferns debut in a 0–0 draw with a Hawaii select VII on 12 December 1987 and ended her international career with 29 caps and 2 goals to her credit.

Chaney represented New Zealand at the Women's World Cup finals in China in 1991 playing 2 group games; a 0–3 loss to Denmark and a 0–4 loss to Norway.
