= Chen Shu-chin =

Chinese football player from Taiwan

Personal information
- Date of birth: 19 September 1974 (age 52)
- Position: Midfielder

Senior career*
Years	Team	Apps	(Gls)
- Jinwen College

International career^{‡}
- Chinese Taipei
- * Club domestic league appearances and goals ‡ National team caps and goals as of 16 November 1991 (before the 1991 FIFA Women's World Cup)

Chen Shu-chin (Chinese: 陳淑菁, born 19 September 1974) is a Taiwanese international footballer who played as a midfielder for the Chinese Taipei women's national football team. She was part of the team at the 1991 FIFA Women's World Cup. On club level she played for Jinwen College in Taiwan.
