= Nanna Mølbach Johansen =

Danish footballer (born 1986)

Personal information
- Date of birth: 19 November 1986 (age 39)
- Place of birth: Denmark
- Position: Forward

Senior career*
Years	Team	Apps	(Gls)
- IK Skovbakken

International career
- Denmark
- * Club domestic league appearances and goals

Nanna Mølbach Johansen (born 19 November 1986) is a Danish retired football midfielder who played for IK Skovbakken and the Danish national team.

== International career ==
Johansen was also part of the Danish team at the 2005 European Championships.
