= Monique van de Elzen =

New Zealand footballer

Personal information
- Full name: Monique Annette van de Elzen
- Date of birth: 17 July 1967 (age 59)
- Place of birth: New Zealand
- Position: Midfielder

International career^{‡}
Years	Team	Apps	(Gls)
1987–1991	New Zealand	20	(11)
- ‡ National team caps and goals as of 15 January 2009

Monique Annette van de Elzen (born 17 July 1967) is a former association football player who represented New Zealand at international level.

Van de Elzen scored a hat-trick on her Football Ferns debut in a 3–0 win over a Hawaii X1 12 December 1987 and ended her international career with 20 caps and 11 goals to her credit.

Van de Elzen represented New Zealand at the Women's World Cup finals in China in 1991 playing all 3 group games; a 0–3 loss to Denmark, a 0–4 loss to Norway and a 1–4 loss to China.
