= Lynley Pedruco =

New Zealand footballer

Personal information
- Full name: Lynley Joy Pedruco
- Date of birth: 11 October 1960 (age 66)
- Place of birth: New Zealand
- Position: Defender

International career
Years	Team	Apps	(Gls)
1984–1994	New Zealand	19	(0)

Lynley Joy Pedruco (née Lucas) (born 11 October 1960) is a former New Zealand association football player who represented her country.

Pedruco made her Football Ferns debut in a 3–0 win over Switzerland on 8 December 1984 and ended her international career with 19 caps to her credit.

Pedruco represented New Zealand at the Women's World Cup finals in China in 1991 playing 2 group games; a 0–4 loss to Norway and a 1–4 loss to China.
