= Julia Campbell (footballer) =

New Zealand footballer (born 1965)

Personal information
- Full name: Julia Petryce Campbell
- Date of birth: 1 April 1965 (age 61)
- Place of birth: New Zealand
- Position: Midfielder

International career
Years	Team	Apps	(Gls)
1987–1995	New Zealand	29	(3)

Julia Petryce Campbell (born 1 April 1965) is a former New Zealand association football player who represented her country.

Campbell made her Football Ferns debut in a 3–0 win over a Hawaii XI on 12 December 1987 and ended her international career with 29 caps and 3 goals to her credit.

Campbell represented New Zealand at the Women's World Cup finals in China in 1991 playing all 3 group games; a 0–3 loss to Denmark, a 0–4 loss to Norway and a 1–4 loss to China.
