= Lorraine Taylor =

New Zealand footballer (1961–2025)

Personal information
- Full name: Lorraine Robin Taylor
- Date of birth: 20 September 1961
- Place of birth: New Zealand
- Date of death: 3 May 2025 (aged 63)
- Position: Midfielder

International career
Years	Team	Apps	(Gls)
1989–1995	New Zealand	22	(0)

Lorraine Robin Taylor (20 September 1961 – 3 May 2025) was an association football player who represented New Zealand at international level.

== Biography ==
Taylor made her New Zealand national team debut in a 2–0 loss to Australia on 26 March 1989 and ended her international career with 22 caps to her credit.

Taylor represented New Zealand at the Women's World Cup finals in China in 1991 playing all three group games; a 3–0 loss to Denmark, a 4–0 loss to Norway and a 4–1 loss to China.

Taylor died on 3 May 2025, at the age of 63.
