= Marie Ewrelius =

Swedish footballer

Personal information
- Date of birth: 31 August 1967 (age 59)
- Position: Defender

Senior career*
Years	Team	Apps	(Gls)
- Djurgårdens IF

International career^{‡}
- Sweden
- * Club domestic league appearances and goals ‡ National team caps and goals as of 16 November 1991 (before the 1991 FIFA Women's World Cup)

Marie Ewrelius (born 31 August 1967) is a Swedish footballer who played as a defender for the Sweden women's national football team. She was part of the team at the inaugural 1991 FIFA Women's World Cup. At the club level she played for Djurgårdens IF in Sweden.
