= Donna Baker =

New Zealand footballer

Personal information
- Full name: Donna Marie Baker
- Date of birth: 27 February 1966 (age 60)
- Position: Midfielder

Senior career*
Years	Team	Apps	(Gls)
- Odense Boldklub
- Frederiksberg Boldklub
- Knowsley United

International career
1983–1995	New Zealand	35	(7)
- * Club domestic league appearances and goals

Donna Marie Baker (born 27 February 1966) is a former association football player who represented New Zealand at international level.

Baker made her Football Ferns debut in a 0–0 draw with Australia on 28 November 1983 and ended her international career with 35 caps and 7 goals to her credit.

Baker represented New Zealand at the Women's World Cup finals in China in 1991 playing all 3 group games; a 0–3 loss to Denmark, a 0–4 loss to Norway and a 1–4 loss to China.
