= Mette Nielsen (footballer) =

Danish footballer (born 1964)

Personal information
- Date of birth: 15 June 1964 (age 62)
- Position: Defender

Senior career*
| Years | Team | Apps | (Gls) |
- Vorup FB

International career^{‡}
- Denmark
- * Club domestic league appearances and goals ‡ National team caps and goals as of 16 November 1991 (before the 1991 FIFA Women's World Cup)

Mette Nielsen (born 15 June 1964) is a Danish footballer who played as a defender for the Denmark women's national football team. She was part of the team at the 1991 FIFA Women's World Cup and UEFA Women's Euro 1991. At the club level, she played for Vorup FB in Denmark.
