= Janne Rasmussen =

Danish footballer (born 1970)

Personal information
- Date of birth: 18 July 1970 (age 56)
- Position: Midfielder

Senior career*
Years	Team	Apps	(Gls)
	Vejle B	62	
–1994	B 1909		
1995	Fortuna Hjørring	15	
1995–	OB		

International career
1991–1999	Denmark	40	(11)
- * Club domestic league appearances and goals

Janne Rasmussen (born 18 July 1970) is a Danish footballer who played as a midfielder for the Denmark women's national football team. She was part of the team at the inaugural 1991 FIFA Women's World Cup as well as the 1999 FIFA Women's World Cup.
