= Liv Strædet =

Norwegian footballer (born 1964)

Medal record

Representing Norway

Women's football

World Cup
Silver medal – second place	China 1991	Team

Liv Strædet (born 21 October 1964 in Fredrikstad) is a former Norwegian football player who played for Norway women's national football team.

She played on the Norwegian team that won silver medals at the 1991 FIFA Women's World Cup in China.
