= Shang Ruihua =

Chinese football coach (born 1944)

Shang Ruihua (born 18 November 1944) is a Chinese football coach, who led the China women's national football team on two separate occasions.

He guided the home nation to a quarter final place at the 1991 FIFA Women's World Cup during his first spell in charge from 1987 until 1991. When Élisabeth Loisel was sacked by the Chinese Football Association in 2008, Shang, known as the godfather of Chinese women's football, retook the position after 17 years. He led the team into the 2008 Summer Olympics but resigned in 2010 after failing to qualify for the 2011 FIFA Women's World Cup.

In 1994–95 he coached the Chinese Taipei women's national football team.
