= Anette Igland =

Norwegian footballer (born 1971)

Personal information
- Full name: Anette Igland
- Date of birth: 2 October 1971 (age 55)
- Position: Defender

Senior career*
| Years | Team | Apps | (Gls) |
- Kaupanger IL
- Bremanger IL

International career^{‡}
| 1990–1992 | Norway | 12 | (0) |
Medal record
Women's football
Representing Norway
World Cup
| Silver medal – second place | China 1991 | Team |
- * Club domestic league appearances and goals as of 14:16, 29 September 2014 (UTC) ‡ National team caps and goals as of 14:16, 29 September 2014 (UTC)

Anette Igland (born 2 October 1971) is a Norwegian former footballer who played for the Norway women's national football team that won silver medals at the 1991 FIFA Women's World Cup in China. At club level she represented the Sogn og Fjordane clubs Kaupanger IL and Bremanger IL. She played 66 times for Bremanger IL and stepped in as chairman of the club in 2011.

Anette's younger sister Ingebjørg Igland was also a footballer and played for Norway's youth national teams.
