= Tone Haugen =

Norwegian footballer (born 1964)

Personal information
- Full name: Tone Haugen
- Date of birth: 6 February 1964 (age 62)
- Place of birth: Namsos, Norway
- Height: 1.70 m (5 ft 7 in)
- Position: Midfielder

Senior career*
Years	Team	Apps	(Gls)
1984–1997	Trondheims-Ørn		
1994–1996	Nikko Securities		
2000–2004	Fortuna Ålesund		

International career^{‡}
1984–1996	Norway	90	(19)
Medal record
Women's football
Representing Norway
Olympic Games
Bronze medal – third place	1996 Atlanta	Team
World Cup
Gold medal – first place	1995 Sweden	Team
Silver medal – second place	1991 China	Team
European Championship
Silver medal – second place	1989 Germany	Team
Gold medal – first place	1987 Norway	Team
- * Club domestic league appearances and goals as of 14:16, 21 September 2014 (UTC) ‡ National team caps and goals as of 14:16, 21 September 2014 (UTC)

Tone Haugen (born 6 February 1964) is a former Norwegian professional footballer who played as a midfielder.

== Career ==
With the Norway women's national team, Haugen won the 1995 FIFA Women's World Cup and an Olympic bronze medal in 1996. At club level she played for SK Trondheims-Ørn in Norway, then joined Japanese L. League team Nikko Securities Dream Ladies on a professional contract.

Haugen debuted for the Norwegian national team in 1984, and scored 19 goals in her 90 caps.

In 2000, Haugen took a job as player-coach of 1. divisjon club Fortuna Ålesund.

== Personal life ==
As an out lesbian, she was in Norway's women's football team for the 2002 Gay Games. In 2014, she was working as a municipal gardener in Ålesund Municipality.
