= Ellen Scheel Aalbu =

Norwegian footballer (born 1968)

Medal record

Women's football

World Cup
Silver medal – second place	China 1991	Team

Ellen Scheel Aalbu (born 27 November 1968) is a former Norwegian football player who played for the Norway women's national football team.

== Career ==
Born on 27 November 1968, Aalbu played for the club IL Jardar. She was capped 32 times, participated on the winning team at the 1987 European Competition for Women's Football, and played on the Norwegian team that won silver medals at the 1991 FIFA Women's World Cup in China.

She is married to Jan Erik Aalbu.
