= Dave Boardman =

New Zealand football manager

Personal information
- Full name: David Boardman

Managerial career
- Years: Team
- New Zealand Women

David Boardman is a football manager.

== Career ==
Boardman was the head coach of the New Zealand women's national team at the 1991 FIFA Women's World Cup.
