= Reidun Seth =

Norwegian footballer and trainer (born 1966)

Medal record

Women's football

Olympic Games
Bronze medal – third place	1996 Atlanta	Team

World championship
Gold medal – first place	Sweden 1995	Team
Silver medal – second place	China 1991	Team

European championship
Gold medal – first place	Italy 1993	Team

Reidun Seth (born 9 June 1966) is a Norwegian footballer, world champion and olympic medallist, a football goalkeeper and a goalkeeper trainer.

She debuted for the Norwegian national team in 1984, and played 71 matches for the national team.

She received a bronze medal at the 1996 Summer Olympics in Atlanta.

Clubs include IL Jardar, GAIS, Trollhättans IF and Nymark IL. Reidun Seth joined Bergen club Arna-Bjørnar in 1999 and retired after the 2002 season. Since then she has worked as a full-time keeper trainer in Bergen and has among her students Norway's keeper, Erika Skarbø.

Following Skarbø's absence due to injury in early 2009 Seth announced that she would be available to play for Arna-Bjørnar in the elite Toppserien league as the club's reserve goalkeeper to first keeper Precious Dede. She played the full 90 minutes in the club's 3–0 win over Trondheims-Ørn on 4 July 2009 at the age of 43 years and 25 days. A year later, on 27 June 2010, Seth was again in action in the Arna-Bjørnar goal for 20 minutes, after first-keeper Erika Skarbø was injured. Seth played her last Toppserien match of 2010 on 18 September 2010 at the age of 44 years and 101 days, a 4–0 win for Arna-Bjørnar over Linderud-Grei. She has made herself available as a reserve keeper for the 2011 season.
