= Terry McCahill =

New Zealand footballer (born 1970)

Personal information
- Full name: Teresa Ann McCahill
- Date of birth: 1 September 1970 (age 56)
- Place of birth: New Zealand
- Position: Defender

International career
Years	Team	Apps	(Gls)
1991–2003	New Zealand	40	(1)

Teresa Ann (Terry) McCahill (born 1 September 1970) is a former New Zealand association football player who represented her country.

McCahill made her Football Ferns debut in a 3–0 win over Australia on 23 October 1991 and ended her international career with 40 caps and 1 goal to her credit.

McCahill represented New Zealand at the Women's World Cup finals in China in 1991 playing all 3 group games; a 0–3 loss to Denmark, a 0–4 loss to Norway and a 1–4 loss to China.
