= Kim Nye =

English-born New Zealand footballer

Personal information
- Full name: Kim Barbara Nye
- Date of birth: 10 May 1961 (age 65)
- Place of birth: England
- Position: Defender

International career
Years	Team	Apps	(Gls)
1989–1995	New Zealand	16	(3)

Kim Barbara Nye (born 10 May 1961) is a former New Zealand association football player who represented her country.

Nye scored on her Football Ferns debut in a 2–0 win over Australia on 26 March 1989 and ended her international career with 16 caps and 3 goals to her credit.

Nye represented New Zealand at the Women's World Cup finals in China in 1991 playing all 3 group games; a 0–3 loss to Denmark, a 0–4 loss to Norway and a 1–4 loss to China, in which she scored New Zealand's only goal of the tournament.
