= Marianne Jensen =

Danish footballer (born 1970)

Personal information
- Date of birth: 14 January 1970 (age 56)
- Position: Midfielder

Senior career*
Years	Team	Apps	(Gls)
- HEI Aarhus

International career^{‡}
- Denmark
- * Club domestic league appearances and goals ‡ National team caps and goals as of 16 November 1991 (before the 1991 FIFA Women's World Cup)

Marianne Jensen (born 14 January 1970) is a Danish footballer who played as a midfielder for the Denmark women's national football team. She was part of the team at the 1991 FIFA Women's World Cup, UEFA Women's Euro 1991 and UEFA Women's Euro 1993. At the club level, she played for HEI Aarhus in Denmark.
