= Gunn Nyborg =

Norwegian footballer (born 1960)

Medal record

Representing Norway

Women's football

World Cup
| Silver medal – second place | China 1991 | Team |

Gunn Lisbeth Nyborg (born 21 March 1960) is a Norwegian former footballer who played as a defender for Asker Fotball and for Norway national team.

== Career ==
Nyborg was part of the Norwegian team winning the 1988 FIFA Women's Invitation Tournament (unofficial World Cup). She played on the Norwegian team that won silver medals at the 1991 FIFA Women's World Cup in China.

Playing 110 matches for the Norway women's national football team in a row, Nyborg was awarded the FIFA Order of Merit. Her achievements with the national team include winning the gold medal at the 1987 European Competition for Women's Football, as well as silver medals in 1989 and 1991.

== Personal life ==
Nyborg was born in Oslo on 21 March 1960.

== See also ==
- List of women's footballers with 100 or more international caps
