= Hanne Nissen =

Danish footballer (born 1970)

Personal information
- Date of birth: 21 November 1970 (age 55)
- Position: Forward

Senior career*
Years	Team	Apps	(Gls)
–1990	Varde IF		
1991	OB		
1992–	B 1909		

International career
1989–1993	Denmark	29	(10)
- * Club domestic league appearances and goals

Hanne Nissen (born 21 November 1970) is a Danish footballer who played as a forward for the Denmark women's national football team. She was part of the team at the 1991 FIFA Women's World Cup and UEFA Women's Euro 1993. At the club level, she played for Odense BK in Denmark.
