= Irene Stelling =

Danish footballer (born 1971)

Personal information
- Date of birth: 25 July 1971 (age 55)
- Place of birth: Denmark
- Position: Forward

Youth career
- 1994–1996: Hartford Hawks

International career
Years	Team	Apps	(Gls)
1996	Denmark	49 (?)	

Irene Stelling (born 25 July 1971) is a Danish former football forward. She played for the Denmark women's national football team at the 1991 FIFA Women's World Cup, and 1996 Summer Olympics.

== See also ==
- Denmark at the 1996 Summer Olympics
