= Karina Sefron =

Danish footballer (born 1967)

Personal information
- Date of birth: 2 July 1967 (age 59)
- Place of birth: Copenhagen, Denmark
- Height: 1.63 m (5 ft 4 in)
- Position: Defender

Youth career
- Bispebjerg Boldklub
- Boldklubben Rødovre

Senior career*
Years	Team	Apps	(Gls)
1990–1993	Malmö FF		
1993–1994	Boldklubben Rødovre		
1994–1997	TSV Siegen		
1997–1999	SG Praunheim / 1. FFC Frankfurt		
1999–2001	Sportfreunde Siegen		
2001–2002	FFC Brauweiler Pulheim		

International career
1988–1998	Denmark	71	(0)
- * Club domestic league appearances and goals

Karina Sefron (born 2 July 1967) is a Danish footballer who played as a defender for the Denmark women's national football team, where she was the team captain. She is in the Danish Football Hall of Fame.

== Career ==
Sefron started playing football at Bispebjerg Boldklub and later joined Boldklubben Rødovre. She then joined Malmö FF in Sweden. Together with her team mate Bonny Madsen, she became the first Danish women's player for a Swedish club. With Malmö she won 2 Swedish Championships and a cup title. In 1993 she returned to Denmark and Boldklubben Rødovre for a single season, before she joined the reigning German Champions TSV Siegen in 1994.

In her first season with the club, she reached the final of the DFB-Pokal, where they lost 1-3 to FSV Frankfurt. In her second season, she won the German Championship, when TSV Siegen finished 2nd in the Northern conference and later FSV Frankfurt in the semi-final and SG Praunheim in the final.

In 1997 she joined SG Praunheim, which later became 1. FFC Frankfurt. In the 1998-99 season, she won the German Championship and Cup double.

== National team ==
Sefron played 71 national team matches. She made her debut for the Danish national team on 8 May 1988 in European Championship qualification match against England, that Denmark won 2-0. Sefron was awarded the Player of the Match award afterwards. She was part of the team at the 1991 FIFA Women's World Cup as the team captain. Denmark finished 7th at the occasion

She won bronze medals at the 1989 and 1993 UEFA Women's Championship.

== Legacy ==
Karina Sefron was included in the Danish Football Hall of Fame in April 2026 together with her teammate and friend Bonny Madsen.

== Honours ==
- German Championship:
  - Winner: 1996, 1999
- German Cup
  - Winner: 1999
  - Finalist: 1995, 2000
- Swedish Championship:
  - Winner: 1991, 1992
- Swedish Cup:
  - Winner: 1990
