= Bonny Madsen =

Danish footballer (born 1967)

Personal information
- Date of birth: 10 August 1967 (age 59)
- Place of birth: Lagos, Nigeria
- Height: 1.78 m (5 ft 10 in)
- Position: Defender

Youth career
- 1976–: Bispebjerg Boldklub

Senior career*
Years	Team	Apps	(Gls)
1990–1992	Malmö FF Dam	82	(2)
1992–1995	Rødovre BK		
1995–	Lugo		
–1998	Pisa		
1998–	ACF Milan		

International career
1987–1997	Denmark	70	(3)
- * Club domestic league appearances and goals

Bonny Madsen (born 10 August 1967) is a Danish former football defender, who was part of the Denmark women's national football team. She competed at the 1996 Summer Olympics, playing three matches. At club level she played for Malmö in Sweden, as well as Lugo, Pisa and ACF Milan in Italy. Madsen was inducted into the Danish Football Hall of Fame in April 2026.

== Club career ==
Madsen was born in Nigeria to a Danish father and Nigerian mother. She moved to Copenhagen aged one year and began playing football as a forward, before an injury to her team's regular defender prompted a successful change of position.

In 1990 and 1991, Madsen won the Swedish Damallsvenskan title with Malmö FF Dam. She later moved to the Italian Serie A, where she was nicknamed: "Le Perla Nera" (English: The Black Pearl). She played for Lugo, Pisa and ACF Milan, winning the 1998–99 league title with the latter.

== International career ==
Madsen made her senior Denmark national team debut on 20 May 1987, in a 2–0 defeat by rivals Sweden. This was almost seven years before the male national team fielded its first black player, Carsten Dethlefsen. She was dropped from the team after a 5–1 defeat by Sweden in October 1988, but was recalled in February 1991 for the Nordic Cup.

She won bronze medals at the 1989 and 1993 UEFA Women's Championship. I 1989 Madsen scored the winning goal in the third-place playoff against Italy.

At the 1991 FIFA Women's World Cup in China, sweeper Madsen played the full 80 minutes in all three group games as Denmark qualified for the knockout stages. In the quarter-final against Germany, she played the full match as Denmark lost 2–1 after extra time.

In February 1995 Madsen broke her leg before a 7–0 friendly defeat by the United States in Winter Park, Florida. The injury ruled her out of the 1995 FIFA Women's World Cup in Sweden. After UEFA Women's Euro 1997 she retired from international football.

== See also ==
- Denmark at the 1996 Summer Olympics
