= Jannie Hansen =

Danish footballer (born 1963)

Personal information
- Date of birth: 6 October 1963 (age 63)
- Place of birth: Denmark
- Position: Defender

Senior career*
Years	Team	Apps	(Gls)
–1989	B 1909		
1990–	BK Rødovre		

International career
1986–1992	Denmark	39	(4)
- * Club domestic league appearances and goals

Jannie Hansen (born 6 October 1963) is a Danish footballer who played as a defender for the Denmark women's national football team. She was part of the team at the 1991 FIFA Women's World Cup and UEFA Women's Euro 1991. At the club level, she played for Rødovre BK in Denmark.
