= Lotte Bagge =

Danish footballer (born 1968)

Personal information
- Full name: Lotte Bagge Mortensen
- Date of birth: 21 May 1968 (age 58)
- Position: Midfielder

Senior career*
| Years | Team | Apps | (Gls) |
| –1986 | Næstved IF | | |
| 1987–1989 | Fortuna Hjørring | | |
| 1990– | B 1909 | | |
- Odense Boldklub

International career
| 1985–1994 | Denmark | 63 | (6) |
- * Club domestic league appearances and goals

Lotte Bagge Mortensen (born 21 May 1968) is a Danish footballer who played as a midfielder for the Denmark women's national football team. She was part of the team at the 1991 FIFA Women's World Cup, UEFA Women's Euro 1991 and UEFA Women's Euro 1993.

At the club level, she played for Næstved IF, before joining Fortuna Hjørring. Three years later she joined B 1909.

She made her debut for the Danish national team on 19 August 1985 in a 1-0 win against England. Her last game was on 15 October 1994 in a 2-0 win over Sweden. At the time of her retirement, she held the record for most matches on the Danish national team.
