= Emma Iozzelli =

Italian footballer (born 1966)

Personal information
- Date of birth: 12 June 1966 (age 60)
- Place of birth: Padua, Italy
- Position: Sweeper

Senior career*
Years	Team	Apps	(Gls)
1980–1987	Prato		
1987–1989	Modena		
1989–1990	Prato		
1990–1991	Sassari		
1991–1993	Reggiana		
1993–2000	Agliana		

International career^{‡}
1989–1997	Italy	75	(1)
- * Club domestic league appearances and goals as of 18:57, 11 June 2022 (UTC) ‡ National team caps and goals as of 18:57, 11 June 2022 (UTC)

Emma Iozzelli (born 12 June 1966) is an Italian footballer who played as a defender for the Italy women's national football team. She was part of the team at the 1991 FIFA Women's World Cup. At club level she played for Reggiana in Italy.
