= Tina Svensson =

Norwegian footballer (born 1966)

Medal record

Representing Norway

Women's football

Olympic Games
Bronze medal – third place	1996 Atlanta	Team

Tina Svensson Grønlund (born 16 November 1966, in Levanger Municipality) is a Norwegian former footballer, world champion and Olympic medalist.

She debuted for the Norwegian national team in 1990, and played 57 matches for the national team, scoring 11 goals.

She received a bronze medal at the 1996 Summer Olympics in Atlanta.

== International goals ==
No.	Date	Venue	Opponent	Score	Result	Competition
1.	21 November 1991	Guangzhou, China	Denmark	1–0	2–1	1991 FIFA Women's World Cup
2.	24 November 1991	Jiangmen, China	Italy	3–2	3–2 (a.e.t.)	1991 FIFA Women's World Cup
3.	27 November 1991	Guangzhou, China	Sweden	1–1	4–1	1991 FIFA Women's World Cup
4.	23 May 1992	Modum, Norway	Switzerland	4–0	6–0	UEFA Women's Euro 1993 qualifying
5.	7 November 1992	Raalte, Netherlands	Netherlands	3–0	3–0	UEFA Women's Euro 1993 qualifying
6.	6 June 1995	Karlstad, Sweden	Nigeria	6–0	8–0	1995 FIFA Women's World Cup
