= Helle Bjerregaard =

Danish footballer (born 1968)

Personal information
- Date of birth: 21 June 1968 (age 58)
- Place of birth: Denmark
- Position: Goalkeeper

Senior career*
Years	Team	Apps	(Gls)
1985–1988	Fortuna Hjørring	90	
1989–1996	BK Rødovre		
1997–	Brøndby		

International career
1987–1996	Denmark	56	(0)
- * Club domestic league appearances and goals

Helle Bjerregaard (born 21 June 1968) is a Danish football goalkeeper who played for the Denmark women's national football team. Bjerregaard was called up for the 1996 Summer Olympics, but did not play.

== See also ==
- Denmark at the 1996 Summer Olympics
