= Annie Gam-Pedersen =

Danish footballer (born 1965)

Personal information
- Date of birth: 5 July 1965 (age 61)
- Place of birth: Denmark
- Position: Forward

Youth career
- –1977: Silkeborg IF
- 1978–: Silkeborg KFUM

Senior career*
Years	Team	Apps	(Gls)
–1984	HEI		
1985–1989	B 1909		
1990–	OB		
- Fjordager IF

International career
1982–1991	Denmark	56	(15)
- * Club domestic league appearances and goals

Annie Gam-Pedersen (born 5 July 1965) is a Danish former footballer who played as a forward for the Denmark women's national football team. Gam-Pedersen won bronze medals with Denmark at the 1984 European Competition for Women's Football. She represented Denmark at the 1991 FIFA Women's World Cup and the UEFA Women's Euro 1993. At the club level, she played for A-Liga clubs HEI, B 1909 and OB.

== Club career ==
Gam-Pedersen played youth football with Silkeborg IF (SIF) until 1978 when she moved to rivals Silkeborg KFUM. At 15 she was named the SKFUM Player of the Year for 1980.
