= Birthe Hegstad =

Norwegian footballer (born 1966)

Personal information
- Full name: Birthe Hegstad
- Date of birth: 23 July 1966 (age 60)
- Place of birth: Trondheim, Norway
- Height: 1.68 m (5 ft 6 in)
- Position: Forward

Youth career
- IL Jardar
- 1985–1988: North Carolina Tar Heels

Senior career*
Years	Team	Apps	(Gls)
1989–1992	Klepp		
1993–1996	SK Sprint-Jeløy		
1997	Athene Moss		

International career^{‡}
1987–1995	Norway	84	(23)
Medal record
Women's football
Representing Norway
World Cup
Silver medal – second place	China 1991	Team
European Championship
Gold medal – first place	Italy 1993	Team
Silver medal – second place	Denmark 1991	Team
Silver medal – second place	Germany 1989	Team
- * Club domestic league appearances and goals as of 14:16, 24 September 2014 (UTC) ‡ National team caps and goals as of 14:16, 24 September 2014 (UTC)

Birthe Hegstad (born 23 July 1966) is a Norwegian former footballer who played for Klepp IL and for the Norway women's national football team.

She played on the Norwegian team that won silver medals at the 1991 FIFA Women's World Cup in China. At the final of UEFA Women's Euro 1993 Hegstad scored the only goal against hosts Italy in Cesena. Her clubs include SK Sprint/Jeløy, Klepp IL, IL Jardar and FK Athene Moss. She also played varsity college soccer in the United States for North Carolina Tar Heels.

After her football career Hegstad became manager of the Coop Mega chain of supermarkets.
