= Lisbet Kolding =

Danish footballer (born 1965)

Personal information
- Date of birth: 6 April 1965 (age 61)
- Place of birth: Denmark
- Position: Midfielder

Senior career*
Years	Team	Apps	(Gls)
1996	HEI		

International career
1996	Denmark		
- * Club domestic league appearances and goals

Lisbet Kolding (born 6 April 1965) is a Danish former footballer. She was part of the Denmark women's national football team.

She competed at the 1996 Summer Olympics, playing 2 matches.

== See also ==
- Denmark at the 1996 Summer Olympics
