= Hege Riise =

Norwegian football coach (born 1969)

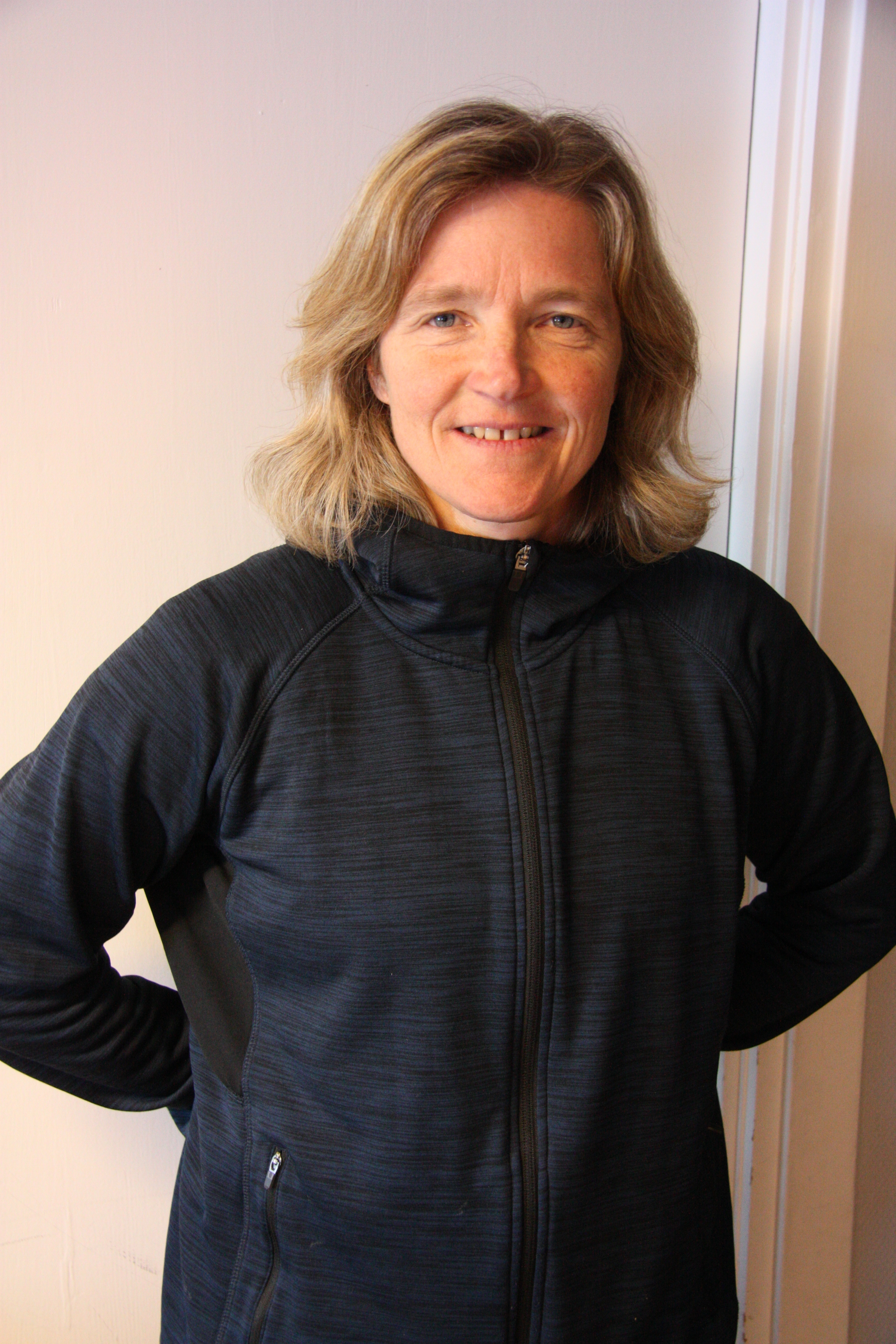
- Riise in 2017

Personal information
- Full name: Hege Riise
- Date of birth: 18 July 1969 (age 57)
- Place of birth: Lørenskog, Norway
- Height: 5 ft 6 in (1.68 m)
- Position: Midfielder

Youth career
- Momoen
- Høland

Senior career*
Years	Team	Apps	(Gls)
1989–1995	Setskog/Høland		
1995–1997	Nikko Securities Dream Ladies		
1997–1999	Setskog/Høland		
2000	Asker	18	(3)
2001–2003	Carolina Courage	39	(12)
2004–2006	Team Strømmen	52	(9)

International career
1990–2004	Norway	188	(58)

Managerial career
- 2007–2008: Team Strømmen
- Norway U23
- 2009–2012: United States (assistant)
- 2012–2016: LSK Kvinner (assistant)
- 2016–2020: LSK Kvinner
- 2021: England (interim)
- 2021: Great Britain Olympic
- 2021–2022: Norway U19
- 2022–2023: Norway
Medal record
Women's football
Representing Norway
Olympic Games
Gold medal – first place	2000 Sydney	Team competition
Bronze medal – third place	1996 Atlanta	Team competition
FIFA World Cup
Gold medal – first place	1995 Sweden	Team
UEFA European Championship
Gold medal – first place	1993 Italy	Team
- * Club domestic league appearances and goals

Hege Riise (born 18 July 1969) is a Norwegian football coach and former midfield player. She is considered one of the best footballers of her generation, having won the FIFA Women's World Cup, the Olympic Games, and the UEFA Women's Euro with the Norway women's national football team.

== Playing career ==
=== Club ===
As a child, Riise practised football, handball, cross-country skiing and ski jumping. She started playing football at age six in Momoen, albeit on a boys' team until the age of 14. She then played on a girls' team in Høland IL, followed by the competitive senior team Setskog/Høland from 1989.

She won the Norwegian Cup competition with Setskog/Høland in 1992. In late 1995 along with four other Norwegians she joined Nikko Securities Dream Ladies football club in Japan. Nikko won the Japanese league and cup competitions in 1996 and the cup in 1997, after which Riise moved back to Norway to play again with Setskog/Høland.

She joined Asker, in 2000, and again won the cup competition with Asker the same year. Drafted by the Carolina Courage in the Women's United Soccer Association 2000 foreign draft, Riise was the team's MVP two times and led the Courage to a WUSA Founders Cup title in 2002, before her involvement was curtailed by an anterior cruciate ligament injury. In 2003 the Norwegian Football Association named Riise the best female Norwegian footballer ever.

Returning to Norway in 2005 Hege Riise joined Team Strømmen of Oslo and became the club's playing assistant trainer in 2006. She played her last top-level match with Team Strømmen on 28 October 2006 aged 37 and retired from football as a player.

=== International ===
Riise made her international debut with the Norwegian national team in 1990. Norway won the UEFA Women's Championship in 1993. Two years later, with Norway, she won the Women's World Cup and was awarded the Golden Ball after the competition.

Riise's biggest achievement with Norway was winning the gold medal at the 2000 Summer Olympics in Sydney, to become one of only three women (all Norwegian) in the world to win the Olympics, the World Cup and the European Championship (with Gro Espeseth and Bente Nordby).

She retired from international football in September 2004 with 188 caps and 58 goals.

== International goals ==
No.	Date	Venue	Opponent	Score	Result	Competition
1.	29 July 1990	Winnipeg, Canada	United States	2–?	2–4	Friendly
2.	14 November 1990	Kristiansand, Norway	Hungary	1–0	2–1	UEFA Women's Euro 1991 qualifying
3.	26 May 1991	Skien, Norway	Soviet Union	1–0	2–0	Friendly
4.	1 September 1991	Medford, United States	United States	1–?	2–1	Friendly
5.	19 November 1991	Guangzhou, China	New Zealand	4–0	4–0	1991 FIFA Women's World Cup
6.	23 May 1992	Modum, Norway	Switzerland	5–0	6–0	UEFA Women's Euro 1993 qualifying
7.	14 August 1992	Medford, United States	United States	2–1	3–1	Friendly
8.	26 September 1992	Kolbotn, Norway	Belgium	6–0	8–0	UEFA Women's Euro 1993 qualifying
9.	26 September 1992	Kolbotn, Norway	Belgium	8–0	8–0	UEFA Women's Euro 1993 qualifying
10.	10 October 1992	Oslo, Norway	Netherlands	2–0	3–0	UEFA Women's Euro 1993 qualifying
11.	7 November 1992	Raalte, Netherlands	Netherlands	1–0	3–0	UEFA Women's Euro 1993 qualifying
12.	18 March 1994	Vila Real de Santo António, Portugal	Denmark	2–1	6–1	1994 Algarve Cup
13.	4 June 1994	Budapest, Hungary	Hungary	4–0	4–0	UEFA Women's Euro 1995 qualifying
14.	10 February 1995	Kristiansand, Norway	Denmark	6–?	6–2	Friendly
15.	17 March 1995	Portimão, Portugal	Sweden	2–0	2–0	1995 Algarve Cup
16.	25 April 1995	Oslo, Norway	China	1–?	2–1	Friendly
17.	6 June 1995	Karlstad, Sweden	Nigeria	3–0	8–0	1995 FIFA Women's World Cup
18.	8 June 1995	Karlstad, Sweden	England	2–0	2–0	1995 FIFA Women's World Cup
19.	10 June 1995	Gävle, Sweden	Canada	2–0	7–0	1995 FIFA Women's World Cup
20.	13 June 1995	Karlstad, Sweden	Denmark	3–0	3–1	1995 FIFA Women's World Cup
21.	18 June 1995	Solna, Sweden	Germany	1–0	2–0	1995 FIFA Women's World Cup
22.	2 August 1995	Philadelphia, United States	Chinese Taipei	2–0	12–1	1995 Women's U.S. Cup
23.	2 August 1995	Philadelphia, United States	Chinese Taipei	9–?	12–1	1995 Women's U.S. Cup
24.	2 August 1995	Philadelphia, United States	Chinese Taipei	11–?	12–1	1995 Women's U.S. Cup
25.	2 August 1995	Philadelphia, United States	Chinese Taipei	12–?	12–1	1995 Women's U.S. Cup
26.	19 September 1995	Ulefoss, Norway	Slovakia	15–0	17–0	UEFA Women's Euro 1997 qualifying
27.	2 February 1996	Tampa, United States	United States	2–2	2–3	Friendly
28.	4 February 1996	Jacksonville, United States	United States	1–0	2–1	Friendly
29.	4 February 1996	Jacksonville, United States	United States	2–1	2–1	Friendly
30.	11 March 1996	Silves, Portugal	China	3–1	4–1	1996 Algarve Cup
31.	13 March 1996	Vila Real de Santo António, Portugal	Portugal	2–0	3–0	1996 Algarve Cup
32.	25 May 1996	Espoo, Finland	Finland	1–0	2–0	
33.	6 July 1996	Kolbotn, Norway	Finland	3–0	7–0	
34.	23 July 1996	Washington, D.C., United States	Germany	3–2	3–2	1996 Summer Olympics
35.	16 February 1997	Sundsvall, Sweden	Sweden	2–0	2–0	Friendly
36.	12 March 1997	Olhão, Portugal	Iceland	6–0	6–0	1997 Algarve Cup
37.	16 March 1997	Loulé, Portugal	China	1–0	1–0	1997 Algarve Cup
38.	28 May 1997		Germany	1–0	3–0	Friendly
39.	1 October 1997	Oslo, Norway	Netherlands	3–0	6–1	1999 FIFA Women's World Cup qualification
40.	21 January 1998	Guangzhou, China	Sweden	2–0	2–1	1998 Four Nations Tournament
41.	17 March 1998	Loulé, Portugal	Finland	1–0	1–0	1998 Algarve Cup
42.	19 March 1998	Lagos, Portugal	United States	2–0	4–1	1998 Algarve Cup
43.	17 June 1998	Ulefoss, Norway	Germany	2–0	3–2	1999 FIFA Women's World Cup qualification
44.	23 June 1999	Landover, United States	Canada	4–1	7–1	1999 FIFA Women's World Cup
45.	26 June 1999	Chicago, United States	Japan	1–0	4–0	1999 FIFA Women's World Cup
46.	30 June 1999	San Jose, United States	Sweden	3–0	3–1	1999 FIFA Women's World Cup
47.	6 February 2000	Fort Lauderdale, United States	United States	1–0	3–2	Friendly
48.	9 February 2000	Boca Raton, United States	United States	2–1	2–1	Friendly
49.	17 September 2000	Canberra, Australia	Nigeria	2–0	3–1	2000 Summer Olympics
50.	19 June 2001	Hønefoss, Norway	Canada	3–0	9–1	Friendly
51.	11 September 2001	Kongsvinger, Norway	Czech Republic	4–0	5–0	2003 FIFA Women's World Cup qualification
52.	1 March 2002	Ferreiras, Portugal	England	3–1	3–1	2002 Algarve Cup
53.	5 March 2002	Lagos, Portugal	United States	1–1	3–2	2002 Algarve Cup
54.	17 February 2003	La Manga, Spain	Denmark	2–1	3–3	Friendly
55.	20 February 2003	La Manga, Spain	Denmark	2–0	4–0	Friendly
56.	14 March 2004	Guia, Portugal	Finland	2–1	4–1	2004 Algarve Cup
57.	16 March 2004	Olhão, Portugal	Italy	3–0	3–0	2004 Algarve Cup
58.	20 March 2004	Faro, Portugal	United States	1–1	1–4	2004 Algarve Cup

== Coaching career ==
Riise retired as a player at the end of the 2006 season with 188 international caps to her credit, the record for all Norwegian footballers. In 2007, she became the chief trainer at Team Strømmen, in the Norwegian women's premier league, the Toppserien. In the 2008 season, Team Strømmen were runners-up in both the league and the Cup competitions.

On 28 January 2009, Riise was appointed Assistant Trainer to the U.S. women's national team.

Riise was appointed interim head coach of the England women's national football team in January 2021. Her tenure bridged the gap between the resignation of Phil Neville, who had originally agreed to see out his contract, and his already-agreed-upon replacement, the incumbent Netherlands head coach Sarina Wiegman due to start in September 2021. Due to the reduced international schedule as a result of the COVID-19, Riise only took charge of three friendlies: defeating Northern Ireland 6–0 in her debut before losing to France and Canada. On 10 March 2021, she was also announced as the manager for Team GB at the delayed 2020 Tokyo Olympics. The team progressed as group winners with seven points in three games before being eliminated in the first knockout round by Australia 4–3 in extra-time.

After her stint in the United Kingdom, Riise fulfilled a prior agreement to take charge of the Norway women's national under-19 football team. In the 2022 UEFA Under-19 Championship, Norway won their group and came second overall, after being defeated 2-1 in the final by Spain.

On 3 August 2022, Riise was officially appointed as Norway head coach replacing Martin Sjögren. The rest of the coaching team consists of the assistant coaches Monica Knudsen and Ingvild Stensland, and the goalkeeping coach Jon Knudsen.

On 1 September 2023, Riise stood down from her role as Norway head coach following an unsuccessful 2023 FIFA Women's World Cup campaign. She subsequently moved into a different role at the Norwegian Football Federation (NFF).

== Honours ==
=== Player ===
Norway

- FIFA Women's World Cup: 1995
- UEFA Women's Championship: 1993
- Summer Olympics gold medal: 2000
- Summer Olympics bronze medal: 1996

Individual

- FIFA Women's World Cup Golden Ball: 1995
- UEFA Women's Championship Golden player: 1993

=== Manager ===
LSK Kvinner

- Toppserien: 2016, 2017, 2018, 2019
- Norwegian Women's Cup: 2016, 2018, 2019

Norway Under-19

- UEFA Women's Under-19 Championship silver medal: 2022

== See also ==
- List of women's footballers with 100 or more international caps
