= UEFA Women's Euro 1993 =

Campionato europeo di calcio femminile 1993
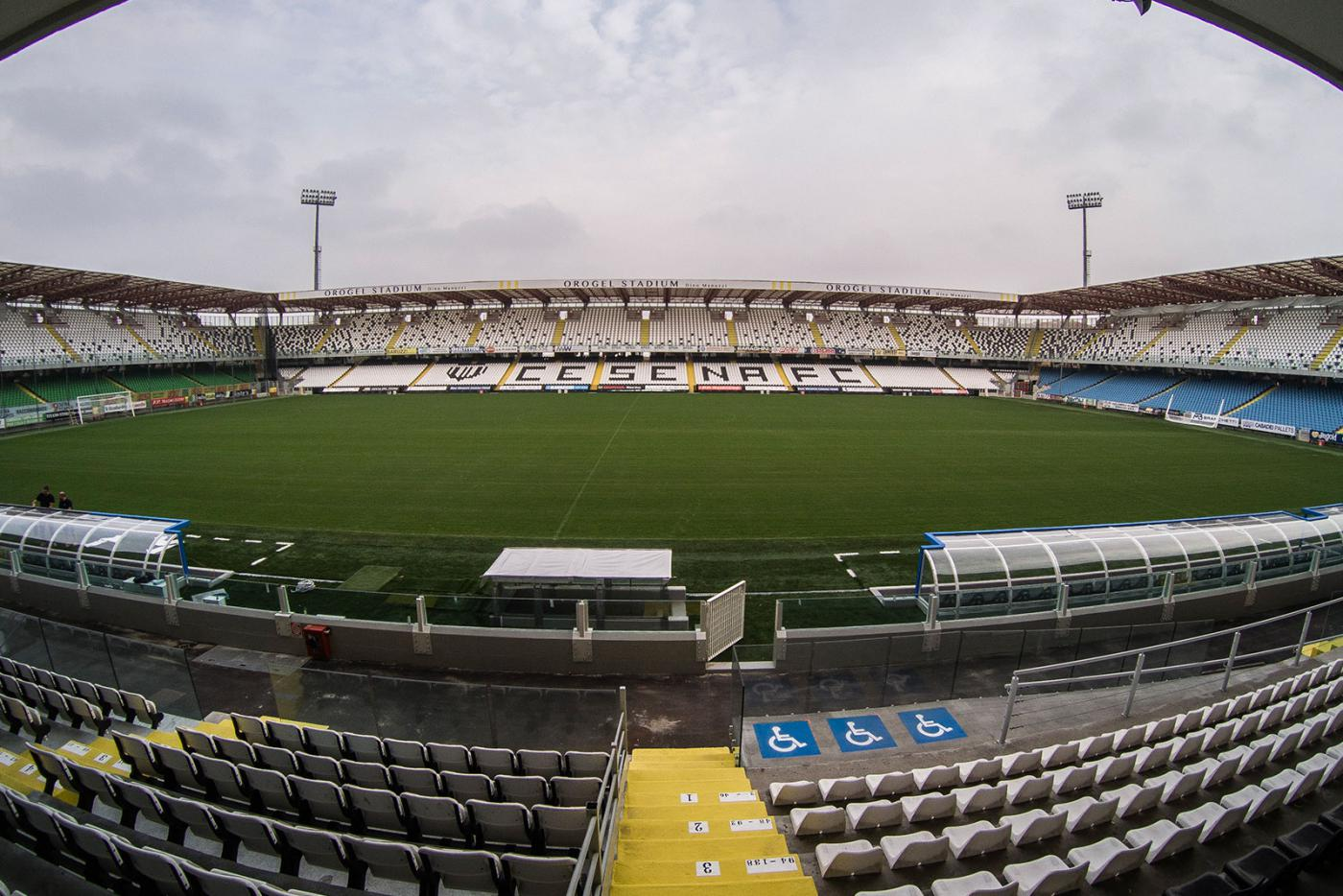
- Stadio Dino Manuzzi in Cesena, Italy, the venue for the final (pictured here in 2019)

Tournament details
- Host country: Italy
- Dates: 29 June – 4 July
- Teams: 4
- Venues: 4 (in 4 host cities)

Final positions
- Champions: Norway (2nd title)
- Runners-up: Italy
- Third place: Denmark
- Fourth place: Germany

Tournament statistics
- Matches played: 4
- Goals scored: 8 (2 per match)
- Attendance: 11,500 (2,875 per match)
- Top scorer(s): (Denmark) Susan Mackensie (2 goals)
- Best player: (Norway) Hege Riise

The 1993 UEFA Women's Championship, commonly referred to as the 1993 Women's Euros or just the 1993 Euros, was a football tournament that happened between 1991 and 1993 (with the qualifying round). The final game was held in Italy. The UEFA Women's Championship is a regular tournament involving European national teams from countries affiliated to UEFA, the European governing body, who have qualified for the competition. The competition aims to determine which national women's team is the best in Europe.

Norway won the competition against Italy who played at home in the final. This would be the last tournament not won by Germany until 2017.

== Format ==
In the qualifying round, 23 teams divided into 8 groups (all of 3 teams, except 1 which had two) and the winner of each group would be qualified into the quarter-finals of the Competition. Then teams played a 2-leg knockout round. In the semifinals and final, only one game would be played and the winner of the final would be proclaimed the Champion. The losers of the semifinals would play a Third Place playoff game.

== Squads ==
For a list of all squads that played in the final tournament, see 1993 UEFA Women's Championship squads

== Bracket ==
Semi-finals
30 June – Rimini
Italy (p)	1 (4)
Germany	1 (3)
29 June – Santa Sofia
Norway	1
Denmark	0

Final
4 July – Cesena
Italy	0
Norway	1
Third place play-off
3 July – Cesenatico
Germany	1
Denmark	3

== Results ==
=== Semifinals ===
29 June 1993

Norway	1–0	Denmark
A. Nymark Andersen 63'	DBU Report (in Danish); NFF Report (in Norwegian); Report

Sportilia, Santa Sofia
Attendance: 1,000
Referee: Plarent Kotherja (Albania)
30 June 1993

Italy	1–1 (a.e.t.)	Germany
Morace 63'	DFB Report (in German); FIGC Report (in Italian); Report	Mohr 56'
Penalties
Marsiletti (penalty scored); Salmaso (penalty scored); Ferraguzzi (penalty scored); Iozzelli (penalty scored)	4–3	(penalty scored) Wiegmann; (penalty scored) Austermühl; (penalty scored) Pohlmann; (penalty missed) ?? (penalty missed) ??

Stadio Romeo Neri, Rimini
Attendance: 3,000
Referee: Anders Frisk (Sweden)

=== Third place playoff ===
3 July 1993

Germany	1–3	Denmark
Meinert 31'	DBU Report (in Danish); DFB Report (in German); Report	Mackensie 10', 42'; Nissen 35'

Stadio Alfiero Moretti, Cesenatico
Attendance: 500
Referee: Dick Jol (Netherlands)

=== Final ===
4 July 1993

Italy	0–1	Norway
	NFF Report (in Norwegian); FIGC Report (in Italian); Report	Hegstad 75'

Stadio Dino Manuzzi, Cesena
Attendance: 7,000
Referee: Alfred Wieser (Austria)

== Goalscorers ==
2 goals

- (Denmark) Susan Mackensie

1 goal

- (Denmark) Hanne Nissen
- (Germany) Maren Meinert
- (Germany) Heidi Mohr
- (Italy) Carolina Morace
- (Norway) Birthe Hegstad
- (Norway) Anne Nymark Andersen

== See also ==
- UEFA Women's Championship
- UEFA
- Women's football (soccer)
