= 1991 FIFA Women's World Cup Group C =

Football tournament group stage

Group C of the 1991 FIFA Women's World Cup took place from 17 to 21 November 1991. The group consisted of Chinese Taipei, Germany, Italy and Nigeria.

== Standings ==
Pos	Team	Pld	W	D	L	GF	GA	GD	Pts	Qualification
1	Germany	3	3	0	0	9	0	+9	6	Advance to knockout stage
2	Italy	3	2	0	1	6	2	+4	4	Advance to knockout stage
3	Chinese Taipei	3	1	0	2	2	8	−6	2	Advance to knockout stage
4	Nigeria	3	0	0	3	0	7	−7	0	

Source: FIFA
Rules for classification: Group stage tiebreakers

== Matches ==
All times listed are local, CST (UTC+8).

=== Germany vs Nigeria ===
17 November 1991
15:30

Germany	4–0	Nigeria
Neid 16'; Mohr 32', 34'; Gottschlich 57'	Report

Jiangmen Stadium, Jiangmen
Attendance: 14,000
Referee: Rafael Rodríguez Medina (El Salvador)

GK	1	Marion Isbert
DF	2	Britta Unsleber	(substituted off) 35'
DF	3	Birgitt Austermühl
DF	4	Jutta Nardenbach
DF	5	Doris Fitschen
MF	7	Martina Voss
MF	8	Bettina Wiegmann
MF	10	Silvia Neid	(substituted off) 36'
MF	14	Petra Damm
FW	9	Heidi Mohr
FW	16	Gudrun Gottschlich
Substitutions:
DF	6	Frauke Kuhlmann	(substituted on) 35'
MF	13	Roswitha Bindl	(substituted on) 36'
Manager:
Gero Bisanz

GK	1	Ann Chiejine
DF	2	Diana Nwaiwu
DF	5	Omo-Love Branch
DF	10	Mavis Ogun
DF	14	Phoebe Ebimiekumo
MF	12	Florence Omagbemi
MF	13	Nkiru Okosieme
MF	15	Ann Mukoro
FW	4	Adaku Okoroafor	(substituted off) 34'
FW	8	Rita Nwadike
FW	9	Ngozi Eucharia Uche	(substituted off) 41'
Substitutions:
FW	11	Gift Showemimo	(substituted on) 34'
FW	7	Chioma Ajunwa	(substituted on) 41'
Manager:
(Netherlands) Jo Bonfrère

=== Chinese Taipei vs Italy ===
17 November 1991
19:45

Chinese Taipei	0–5	Italy
	Report	Ferraguzzi 15'; Marsiletti 29'; Morace 37', 52', 66'

Jiangmen Stadium, Jiangmen
Attendance: 11,000
Referee: Fethi Boucetta (Tunisia)

GK	1	Hong Li-chyn
DF	3	Chen Shwu-ju
DF	4	Lo Chu-yin
DF	11	Hsu Chia-cheng
DF	12	Lan Lan-fen
MF	6	Chou Tai-ying
MF	8	Shieh Su-jean
MF	9	Wu Su-ching
MF	17	Lin Mei-jih	(substituted off) 49'
FW	10	Huang Yu-chuan	(substituted off) 62'
FW	14	Ko Chiao-lin
Substitutions:
DF	15	Wu Min-hsun	(substituted on) 49'
FW	7	Lin Mei-chun	(substituted on) 62'
Manager:
Chong Tsu-pin

GK	1	Stefania Antonini
DF	3	Marina Cordenons
DF	5	Raffaella Salmaso
DF	6	Maura Furlotti		(substituted off) 48'
MF	4	Maria Mariotti
MF	8	Federica D'Astolfo
MF	10	Feriana Ferraguzzi
MF	11	Adele Marsiletti
MF	16	Fabiana Correra		(substituted off) 59'
FW	7	Silvia Fiorini	(yellow card) 59'
FW	9	Carolina Morace
Substitutions:
DF	13	Emma Iozzelli		(substituted on) 48'
FW	17	Nausica Pedersoli		(substituted on) 59'
Manager:
Sergio Guenza

=== Italy vs Nigeria ===
19 November 1991
15:30

Italy	1–0	Nigeria
Morace 68'	Report

Zhongshan Stadium, Zhongshan
Attendance: 12,000
Referee: Jim McCluskey (Scotland)

GK	1	Stefania Antonini
DF	2	Paola Bonato	(substituted off) 63'
DF	3	Marina Cordenons
DF	6	Maura Furlotti
DF	14	Elisabetta Bavagnoli	(substituted off) 36'
MF	8	Federica D'Astolfo
MF	10	Feriana Ferraguzzi
MF	11	Adele Marsiletti
MF	16	Fabiana Correra
FW	7	Silvia Fiorini
FW	9	Carolina Morace
Substitutions:
MF	4	Maria Mariotti	(substituted on) 36'
MF	15	Anna Mega	(substituted on) 63'
Manager:
Sergio Guenza

GK	1	Ann Chiejine
DF	2	Diana Nwaiwu		(substituted off) 78'
DF	3	Ngozi Ezeocha
DF	5	Omo-Love Branch
DF	10	Mavis Ogun
DF	17	Edith Eluma	(yellow card) 75'
MF	12	Florence Omagbemi
MF	13	Nkiru Okosieme
FW	7	Chioma Ajunwa
FW	8	Rita Nwadike
FW	9	Ngozi Eucharia Uche		(substituted off) 73'
Substitutions:
MF	18	Rachael Yamala		(substituted on) 73'
MF	6	Nkechi Mbilitam		(substituted on) 78'
Manager:
(Netherlands) Jo Bonfrère

=== Chinese Taipei vs Germany ===
19 November 1991
19:45

Chinese Taipei	0–3	Germany
	Report	Wiegmann 10' (pen.); Mohr 21', 50'

Zhongshan Stadium, Zhongshan
Attendance: 10,000
Referee: Fethi Boucetta (Tunisia)

GK	18	Lin Hui-fang
DF	3	Chen Shwu-ju
DF	4	Lo Chu-yin
DF	11	Hsu Chia-cheng
DF	12	Lan Lan-fen
DF	15	Wu Min-hsun
MF	6	Chou Tai-ying
MF	8	Shieh Su-jean
MF	9	Wu Su-ching
FW	10	Huang Yu-chuan	(substituted off) 66'
FW	14	Ko Chiao-lin	(substituted off) 46'
Substitutions:
FW	7	Lin Mei-chun	(substituted on) 46'
MF	2	Liu Hsiu-mei	(substituted on) 66'
Manager:
Chong Tsu-pin

GK	1	Marion Isbert
DF	3	Birgitt Austermühl	(substituted off) 61'
DF	4	Jutta Nardenbach	(substituted off) 41'
DF	5	Doris Fitschen
MF	7	Martina Voss
MF	8	Bettina Wiegmann
MF	13	Roswitha Bindl
MF	14	Petra Damm
MF	15	Christine Paul
FW	9	Heidi Mohr
FW	16	Gudrun Gottschlich
Substitutions:
DF	6	Frauke Kuhlmann	(substituted on) 41'
MF	11	Beate Wendt	(substituted on) 61'
Manager:
Gero Bisanz

=== Chinese Taipei vs Nigeria ===
21 November 1991
19:45

Chinese Taipei	2–0	Nigeria
Lin Mei-chun 38'; Chou Tai-ying 55'	Report

Jiangmen Stadium, Jiangmen
Attendance: 14,000
Referee: Rafael Rodríguez Medina (El Salvador)

GK	18	Lin Hui-fang	(red card) 6'
DF	3	Chen Shwu-ju
DF	4	Lo Chu-yin
DF	11	Hsu Chia-cheng
DF	12	Lan Lan-fen
DF	15	Wu Min-hsun
MF	2	Liu Hsiu-mei		(substituted off) 6'
MF	6	Chou Tai-ying
MF	8	Shieh Su-jean
MF	9	Wu Su-ching		(substituted off) 78'
FW	7	Lin Mei-chun
Substitutions:
GK	1	Hong Li-chyn		(substituted on) 6'
MF	17	Lin Mei-jih		(substituted on) 78'
Manager:
Chong Tsu-pin

GK	1	Ann Chiejine
DF	2	Diana Nwaiwu
DF	3	Ngozi Ezeocha		(substituted off) 41'
DF	5	Omo-Love Branch
DF	10	Mavis Ogun
DF	17	Edith Eluma
MF	12	Florence Omagbemi		(substituted off) 60'
MF	13	Nkiru Okosieme
FW	7	Chioma Ajunwa
FW	8	Rita Nwadike
FW	9	Ngozi Eucharia Uche	(yellow card) 48'
Substitutions:
MF	18	Rachael Yamala		(substituted on) 41'
MF	15	Ann Mukoro		(substituted on) 60'
Manager:
(Netherlands) Jo Bonfrère

=== Italy vs Germany ===
21 November 1991
19:45

Italy	0–2	Germany
	Report	Mohr 67'; Unsleber 79'

Zhongshan Stadium, Zhongshan
Attendance: 12,000
Referee: Jim McCluskey (Scotland)

GK	1	Stefania Antonini
DF	3	Marina Cordenons
DF	5	Raffaella Salmaso
DF	13	Emma Iozzelli
DF	14	Elisabetta Bavagnoli
MF	4	Maria Mariotti
MF	8	Federica D'Astolfo
MF	10	Feriana Ferraguzzi	(yellow card) 50'
MF	11	Adele Marsiletti
FW	7	Silvia Fiorini		(substituted off) 34'
FW	9	Carolina Morace
Substitutions:
MF	15	Anna Mega		(substituted on) 34'	(substituted off) 64'
MF	16	Fabiana Correra			(substituted on) 64'
Manager:
Sergio Guenza

GK	1	Marion Isbert
DF	2	Britta Unsleber	(yellow card) 50'
DF	3	Birgitt Austermühl
DF	5	Doris Fitschen
MF	7	Martina Voss
MF	8	Bettina Wiegmann
MF	13	Roswitha Bindl
MF	15	Christine Paul
MF	17	Sandra Hengst		(substituted off) 41'
FW	9	Heidi Mohr
FW	16	Gudrun Gottschlich		(substituted off) 68'
Substitutions:
DF	6	Frauke Kuhlmann		(substituted on) 41'
MF	11	Beate Wendt		(substituted on) 68'
Manager:
Gero Bisanz

== See also ==
- Chinese Taipei at the FIFA Women's World Cup
- Germany at the FIFA Women's World Cup
- Italy at the FIFA Women's World Cup
- Nigeria at the FIFA Women's World Cup
