= UEFA Women's Euro 1991 squads =

This article lists all the confirmed national football squads for the UEFA Women's Euro 1991.

Players marked (c) were named as captain for their national squad.

== Denmark ==
Head coach: (Denmark) Keld Gantzhorn

No.	Pos.	Player	Date of birth (age)	Caps	Club
1	GK	Helle Bjerregaard	21 June 1968 (aged 23)		(Denmark) BK Rødovre
2	DF	Karina Sefron (c)	2 July 1967 (aged 24)		(Sweden) Malmö FF Dam
3	DF	Jannie Hansen	6 October 1963 (aged 27)		(Denmark) BK Rødovre
4	DF	Bonny Madsen	10 August 1967 (aged 23)		(Sweden) Malmö FF Dam
5	MF	Lisbet Kolding	6 April 1965 (aged 26)		(Denmark) HEI
6	DF	Ulla Christensen	4 November 1965 (aged 25)		(Denmark) Fortuna Hjørring
7	MF	Pernille Obel	25 April 1966 (aged 25)		(Denmark) Hillerød
8	MF	Lotte Bagge	21 May 1968 (aged 23)		(Denmark) B 1909
9	FW	Helle Jensen	23 March 1969 (aged 22)		(Denmark) B 1909
10	FW	Annie Gam-Pedersen	5 July 1965 (aged 26)		(Denmark) OB
11	MF	Irene Stelling	25 July 1971 (aged 19)		(Denmark) HEI
12	MF	Marianne Jensen	14 January 1970 (aged 21)		(Denmark) HEI
13	MF	Marianne Jacobsen	1 January 1965 (aged 26)		(Denmark) HEI
14	FW	Annette Thychosen	30 August 1968 (aged 22)		(Denmark) OB
15	DF	Mette Nielsen	15 June 1964 (aged 27)		(Denmark) Vorup FB
16	GK	Gitte Hansen	21 September 1961 (aged 29)	34	(Denmark) B 1909
	DF	Tina Jensen	7 April 1970 (aged 21)		(Denmark) Kolding B
	DF	Alice Larsen	11 January 1968 (aged 23)		(Denmark) BK Rødovre
	DF	Helle Rotbøll	8 October 1963 (aged 27)		(Denmark) HEI

== Germany ==
Head coach: (Germany) Gero Bisanz

No.	Pos.	Player	Date of birth (age)	Caps	Club
	GK	Marion Isbert	25 February 1964 (aged 27)		(Germany) TSV Siegen
	DF	Roswitha Bindl	14 January 1965 (aged 26)		(Germany) Wacker München
	DF	Frauke Kuhlmann	27 September 1966 (aged 24)		(Germany) Schmalfelder SV
	DF	Jutta Nardenbach	13 August 1968 (aged 22)		(Germany) TSV Siegen
	DF	Sissy Raith	11 June 1960 (aged 31)		
	DF	Dagmar Uebelhör	10 December 1965 (aged 25)		
	DF	Britta Unsleber	25 December 1966 (aged 24)		(Germany) FSV Frankfurt
	MF	Petra Damm	20 March 1961 (aged 30)		(Germany) VfR Eintracht Wolfsburg
	MF	Doris Fitschen	25 October 1968 (aged 22)		(Germany) VfR Eintracht Wolfsburg
	MF	Ursula Lohn	7 November 1966 (aged 24)		
	MF	Susanne Brück	30 November 1972 (aged 18)		
	MF	Martina Voss	22 December 1967 (aged 23)		(Germany) TSV Siegen
	MF	Sandra Hengst	12 April 1973 (aged 18)		(Germany) KBC Duisburg
	MF	Bettina Wiegmann	7 October 1971 (aged 19)		(Germany) Grün-Weiß Brauweiler
	FW	Katja Bornschein	16 March 1973 (aged 18)		
	FW	Gudrun Gottschlich	23 May 1970 (aged 21)		(Germany) KBC Duisburg
9	FW	Heidi Mohr	29 May 1967 (aged 24)		(Germany) TuS Niederkirchen
10	FW	Silvia Neid (c)	2 May 1964 (aged 27)		(Germany) TSV Siegen

== Italy ==
Head coach: (Italy) Sergio Guenza

No.	Pos.	Player	Date of birth (age)	Caps	Club
1	GK	Giorgia Brenzan	21 August 1967 (aged 23)		(Italy) Sassari
2	DF	Paola Bonato	31 January 1961 (aged 30)		(Italy) Reggiana
3	DF	Marina Cordenons	12 January 1969 (aged 22)		(Italy) Pordenone
4	DF	Maura Furlotti	12 September 1957 (aged 33)		(Italy) Lazio
5	MF	Elisabetta Saldi			
6	MF	Adele Marsiletti	7 November 1964 (aged 26)		(Italy) Reggiana
7	FW	Silvia Fiorini	24 December 1969 (aged 21)		(Italy) Firenze
8	MF	Feriana Ferraguzzi	20 February 1959 (aged 32)		(Belgium) Standard Liège
9	FW	Carolina Morace (c)	5 February 1964 (aged 27)		(Italy) Milan '82
10	DF	Elisabetta Bavagnoli	3 September 1963 (aged 27)		(Italy) Milan '82
11	FW	Antonella Carta	1 March 1967 (aged 24)		(Italy) Sassari
12	GK	Stefania Antonini	10 October 1970 (aged 20)		(Italy) Reggiana
13		Florinda Ciardi	29 August 1970 (aged 20)		
14	MF	Fabiana Correra	1 October 1967 (aged 23)		(Italy) Turris
15	MF	Federica D'Astolfo	27 October 1966 (aged 24)		(Italy) Sassari
16	DF	Emma Iozzelli	12 June 1966 (aged 25)		(Italy) Reggiana
17	FW	Anna Maria Migliaccio			

== Norway ==
Head coach: (Norway) Even Pellerud

No.	Pos.	Player	Date of birth (age)	Caps	Club
1	GK	Reidun Seth	9 June 1966 (aged 25)		(Sweden) GAIS
	DF	Gunn Nyborg	21 March 1960 (aged 31)		(Norway) Asker
	DF	Trine Stenberg	6 December 1969 (aged 21)		(Norway) Sandviken
	DF	Heidi Støre (c)	4 July 1963 (aged 28)		(Norway) Sprint-Jeløy
	DF	Tina Svensson	16 November 1966 (aged 24)		(Norway) Asker
	MF	Lisbeth Bakken	24 October 1967 (aged 23)		(Norway) Sprint-Jeløy
	MF	Agnete Carlsen	15 January 1971 (aged 20)		(Norway) Sprint-Jeløy
	MF	Gro Espeseth	30 October 1972 (aged 18)		(Norway) Sandviken
	MF	Tone Haugen	6 February 1964 (aged 27)		(Norway) Trondheims-Ørn
	MF	Margunn Humlestøl	25 January 1970 (aged 21)		(Norway) Asker
	MF	Hege Riise	18 July 1969 (aged 21)		(Norway) Setskog/Høland FK
	MF	Liv Strædet	21 October 1964 (aged 26)		(Norway) Sprint-Jeløy
	MF	Cathrine Zaborowski	3 August 1971 (aged 19)		(Norway) Asker
	FW	Ann Kristin Aarønes	19 January 1973 (aged 18)		(Norway) Spjelkavik
	FW	Birthe Hegstad	23 July 1966 (aged 24)		(Norway) Klepp
	FW	Linda Medalen	17 June 1965 (aged 26)		(Norway) Asker
