= 1989 European Competition for Women's Football squads =

This article lists all the confirmed national football squads for the 1989 European Competition for Women's Football.

Players marked (c) were named as captain for their national squad.

== Germany ==
Head coach: (Germany) Gero Bisanz

No.	Pos.	Player	Date of birth (age)	Caps	Goals	Club
1	GK	Marion Isbert	25 February 1964 (aged 25)			(German Football Association) TuS Ahrbach
2	DF	Britta Unsleber	25 December 1966 (aged 22)			(German Football Association) FSV Frankfurt
3	DF	Sissy Raith	11 June 1960 (aged 29)			(German Football Association) TSV Siegen
4	DF	Jutta Nardenbach	13 August 1968 (aged 20)			(German Football Association) TuS Ahrbach
5	DF	Petra Landers	16 January 1962 (aged 27)			
6	MF	Doris Fitschen	25 October 1968 (aged 20)			(German Football Association) VfR Eintracht Wolfsburg
7	MF	Martina Voss	22 December 1967 (aged 21)			(German Football Association) TSV Siegen
8	MF	Petra Damm	20 March 1961 (aged 28)			
9	FW	Heidi Mohr	29 May 1967 (aged 22)			(German Football Association) TuS Niederkirchen
10	FW	Silvia Neid (c)	2 May 1964 (aged 25)			(German Football Association) TSV Siegen
11	MF	Ursula Lohn	7 November 1966 (aged 22)			
12	GK	Elke Walther	1 April 1967 (aged 22)			
13	DF	Frauke Kuhlmann	27 September 1966 (aged 22)			
14	MF	Angelika Fehrmann	6 January 1964 (aged 25)			
15	DF	Andrea Haberlaß	26 January 1964 (aged 25)			
16	DF	Roswitha Bindl	14 January 1965 (aged 24)			(German Football Association) Bayern Munich
	MF	Claudia Sonn	7 January 1966 (aged 23)			
	FW	Thekla Krause	18 May 1969 (aged 20)			

== Italy ==
Head coach: (Italy) Sergio Guenza

No.	Pos.	Player	Date of birth (age)	Caps	Goals	Club
1	GK	Eva Russo	20 December 1966 (aged 22)			
2	DF	Paola Bonato	31 January 1961 (aged 28)			
3	DF	Adele Marsiletti	7 November 1964 (aged 24)			
4	MF	Maria Mariotti	27 January 1964 (aged 25)			
5	MF	Elisabetta Saldi				
6	DF	Anna Mega	21 October 1962 (aged 26)			(Italian Football Federation) Juve Siderno
7	MF	Elisabetta Bavagnoli	3 September 1963 (aged 25)			(Italian Football Federation) Modena F.C.
8	FW	Carolina Morace	5 February 1964 (aged 25)			(Italian Football Federation) Lazio
9	FW	Elisabetta Vignotto (c)	13 January 1954 (aged 35)			(Italian Football Federation) ASD Reggiana CF
10	MF	Feriana Ferraguzzi	20 February 1959 (aged 30)			(Royal Belgian Football Association) Standard Liège
11	MF	Antonella Carta	1 March 1967 (aged 22)			
12	GK	Giorgia Brenzan	21 August 1967 (aged 21)			
15	MF	Emma Iozzelli	12 June 1966 (aged 23)			
16	DF	Federica D'Astolfo	27 October 1966 (aged 22)			

== Norway ==
Head coach: (Norway) Erling Hokstad

No.	Pos.	Player	Date of birth (age)	Caps	Goals	Club
1	GK	Hege Ludvigsen	28 January 1964 (aged 25)			(Norwegian Football Federation) Sprint-Jeløy
2	MF	Cathrine Zaborowski	3 August 1971 (aged 17)			(Norwegian Football Federation) Asker
3	MF	Liv Strædet	21 October 1964 (aged 24)			(Norwegian Football Federation) Sprint-Jeløy
4	DF	Trine Stenberg	6 December 1969 (aged 19)			(Norwegian Football Federation) Sandviken
5	DF	Gunn Nyborg	21 March 1960 (aged 29)			(Norwegian Football Federation) Asker
6	MF	Torill Hoch-Nielsen	12 March 1966 (aged 23)			(Norwegian Football Federation) Sprint-Jeløy
7	MF	Tone Haugen	6 February 1964 (aged 25)			(Norwegian Football Federation) Trondheims-Ørn
8	DF	Heidi Støre (c)	4 July 1963 (aged 25)			(Norwegian Football Federation) Sprint-Jeløy
9	FW	Sissel Grude	17 February 1967 (aged 22)			(Norwegian Football Federation) Klepp
10	FW	Linda Medalen	17 June 1965 (aged 24)			(Norwegian Football Federation) Asker
11	FW	Birthe Hegstad	23 July 1966 (aged 22)			(Norwegian Football Federation) Klepp
13	FW	Turid Storhaug	21 October 1968 (aged 20)			(Norwegian Football Federation) Klepp
15	MF	Trude Haugland	18 September 1966 (aged 22)			(Norwegian Football Federation) Trondheims-Ørn
16	MF	Agnete Carlsen	15 January 1971 (aged 18)			(Norwegian Football Federation) Sprint-Jeløy
	DF	Bjørg Storhaug	9 May 1962 (aged 27)			(Norwegian Football Federation) Klepp

== Sweden ==
Head coach: (Sweden) Gunilla Paijkull

No.	Pos.	Player	Date of birth (age)	Caps	Goals	Club
1	GK	Elisabeth Leidinge	6 March 1957 (aged 32)	66	0	(Swedish Football Association) Jitex BK
2	DF	Camilla Fors	24 April 1969 (aged 20)	3	0	(Swedish Football Association) Jitex BK
3	MF	Marie Karlsson	4 December 1963 (aged 25)	21	0	(Swedish Football Association) Öxabäcks IF
4	DF	Anette Hansson	2 May 1963 (aged 26)	25	3	(Swedish Football Association) Jitex BK
5	DF	Eva Zeikfalvy	18 April 1967 (aged 22)	14	0	(Swedish Football Association) Malmö FF
6	MF	Åsa Persson	31 July 1965 (aged 23)	3	0	(Swedish Football Association) Öxabäcks IF
7	MF	Ingrid Johansson (c)	9 July 1965 (aged 23)	22	1	(Swedish Football Association) GAIS
8	FW	Helen Johansson	9 July 1965 (aged 23)	36	12	(Swedish Football Association) GAIS
9	FW	Pia Sundhage	13 February 1960 (aged 29)	80	40	(Swedish Football Association) Jitex BK
10	FW	Lena Videkull	9 December 1962 (aged 26)	36	20	(Swedish Football Association) Malmö FF
11	FW	Eleonor Hultin	9 August 1963 (aged 25)	11	3	(Swedish Football Association) Jitex BK
12	GK	Marina Persson		3	0	(Swedish Football Association) Öxabäcks IF
13	MF	Malin Swedberg	15 September 1968 (aged 20)	2	0	(Swedish Football Association) Djurgårdens IF
14	MF	Camilla Andersson	3 July 1967 (aged 21)	0	0	(Swedish Football Association) Malmö FF
15	MF	Pia Syrén	16 November 1966 (aged 22)	8	0	(Swedish Football Association) Öxabäcks IF
16	FW	Anneli Andelén	21 June 1968 (aged 21)	20	4	(Swedish Football Association) Öxabäcks IF

Source: Swedish Football Association
