= UEFA Women's Euro 1993 squads =

The UEFA Women's Euro 1993 was an international women's association football tournament held in Italy from 29 June to 4 July 1993.

== Denmark ==
Head coach: (Denmark) Keld Gantzhorn

No.	Pos.	Player	Date of birth (age)	Caps	Club
1	GK	Helle Bjerregaard	21 June 1968 (aged 25)	42	(Denmark) BK Rødovre
2	DF	Karina Sefron	2 July 1967 (aged 25)	42	(Denmark) BK Rødovre
3	DF	Bonny Madsen	10 August 1967 (aged 25)	30	(Denmark) BK Rødovre
4	MF	Irene Stelling	25 July 1971 (aged 21)	24	(Denmark) HEI
5	MF	Rikke Holm	22 March 1972 (aged 21)	10	(Denmark) B 1909
6	MF	Susan Mackensie (captain)	24 December 1962 (aged 30)	25	(Denmark) HEI
7	MF	Lotte Bagge	21 May 1968 (aged 25)	52	(Denmark)
8	MF	Marianne Jensen	14 January 1970 (aged 23)	28	(Denmark) HEI
9	FW	Hanne Nissen	21 November 1970 (aged 22)	25	(Denmark) B 1909
10	FW	Helle Jensen	23 March 1969 (aged 24)	41	(Denmark) B 1909
11	FW	Annette Thychosen	30 August 1968 (aged 24)	34	(Denmark) OB
12	DF	Lene Terp	15 April 1973 (aged 20)	3	(Denmark) Vejle B
13	MF	Lisbet Kolding	6 April 1965 (aged 28)	39	(Denmark) HEI
14	MF	Janne Rasmussen	18 July 1970 (aged 22)	11	(Denmark) B 1909
15	MF	Christina Petersen	17 September 1974 (aged 18)	1	(Denmark) Fortuna Hjørring
16	GK	Dorthe Larsen	8 August 1969 (aged 23)	2	(Denmark) Fortuna Hjørring

== Germany ==
Head coach: (Germany) Gero Bisanz

No.	Pos.	Player	Date of birth (age)	Caps	Club
1	GK	Manuela Goller	1 April 1964 (aged 29)		
2	DF	Anouschka Bernhard	5 October 1970 (aged 22)		
3	DF	Birgitt Austermühl	8 October 1965 (aged 27)		
4	DF	Jutta Nardenbach	13 August 1968 (aged 24)		(Germany) TSV Siegen
5	MF	Doris Fitschen	25 October 1968 (aged 24)		(Germany) TSV Siegen
6	DF	Dagmar Pohlmann	7 February 1972 (aged 21)		
7	FW	Gudrun Gottschlich	23 May 1970 (aged 23)		
8	MF	Bettina Wiegmann	7 October 1971 (aged 21)		(Germany) Grün-Weiß Brauweiler
9	FW	Heidi Mohr	29 May 1967 (aged 26)		(Germany) TuS Niederkirchen
10	FW	Silvia Neid (captain)	2 May 1964 (aged 29)		(Germany) TSV Siegen
11	FW	Katja Bornschein	16 March 1973 (aged 20)		
12	GK	Silke Rottenberg	5 January 1971 (aged 22)		(Germany) TSV Siegen
14	DF	Britta Unsleber	25 December 1966 (aged 26)		(Germany) TSV Siegen
15	FW	Maren Meinert	5 August 1973 (aged 19)		
16	MF	Steffi Jones	22 December 1972 (aged 20)		(Germany) SG Praunheim
	GK	Elke Walther	1 April 1967 (aged 26)		
	DF	Manuela Schultealbert	15 January 1973 (aged 20)		
	MF	Susanne Brück	30 November 1972 (aged 20)		
	MF	Martina Voss	22 December 1967 (aged 25)		(Germany) TSV Siegen
	FW	Patricia Brocker	7 April 1966 (aged 27)		(Germany) TuS Niederkirchen
	FW	Michaela Kubat	27 September 1969 (aged 23)		(Germany) TSV Siegen

== Italy ==
Head coach: (Italy) Sergio Guenza

No.	Pos.	Player	Date of birth (age)	Caps	Club
	GK	Stefania Antonini	10 October 1970 (aged 22)		
	GK	Giorgia Brenzan	21 August 1967 (aged 25)		(Italy) Sassari
	DF	Elisabetta Bavagnoli	3 September 1963 (aged 29)		(Italy) Milan '82
	DF	Marina Cordenons	12 January 1969 (aged 24)		
	DF	Emma Iozzelli	12 June 1966 (aged 27)		
	DF	Dolores Prestifillipo			
	DF	Raffaella Salmaso	16 April 1968 (aged 25)		(Italy) Milan '82
	MF	Bianca Baldelli			
	MF	Antonella Carta	1 March 1967 (aged 26)		
	MF	Florinda Ciardi	29 August 1970 (aged 22)		
	MF	Rosa Ciardi			
	MF	Federica D'Astolfo	27 October 1966 (aged 26)		
	MF	Feriana Ferraguzzi	20 February 1959 (aged 34)		(Belgium) Standard Liège
	MF	Silvia Fiorini	24 December 1969 (aged 23)		
	MF	Maria Mariotti	27 January 1964 (aged 29)		
	MF	Adele Marsiletti	7 November 1964 (aged 28)		
	FW	Rita Guarino	31 January 1971 (aged 22)		(Italy) Reggiana
	FW	Carolina Morace (captain)	5 February 1964 (aged 29)		(Italy) Milan '82

== Norway ==
Head coach: (Norway) Even Pellerud

No.	Pos.	Player	Date of birth (age)	Caps	Club
	GK	Bente Nordby	23 July 1974 (aged 18)		(Norway) Sprint-Jeløy
	GK	Reidun Seth	9 June 1966 (aged 27)		(Norway) Sandviken
	DF	Gunn Nyborg	21 March 1960 (aged 33)		(Norway) Asker
	DF	Nina Nymark Andersen	28 September 1972 (aged 20)		(Norway) Sandviken
	DF	Anne Nymark Andersen	28 September 1972 (aged 20)		(Norway) Sandviken
	DF	Katrine Nysveen	26 November 1973 (aged 19)		(Norway) Setskog/Høland FK
	DF	Heidi Støre (captain)	4 July 1963 (aged 29)		(Norway) Sprint-Jeløy
	DF	Tina Svensson	16 November 1966 (aged 26)		(Norway) Asker
	MF	Agnete Carlsen	15 January 1971 (aged 22)		(Norway) Sprint-Jeløy
	MF	Gro Espeseth	30 October 1972 (aged 20)		(Norway) Sandviken
	MF	Elin Krokan	7 June 1971 (aged 22)		(Norway) Setskog/Høland
	MF	Hege Riise	18 July 1969 (aged 23)		(Norway) Setskog/Høland FK
	MF	Cathrine Zaborowski	3 August 1971 (aged 21)		(Norway) Asker
	FW	Ann Kristin Aarønes	19 January 1973 (aged 20)		(Norway) Trondheims-Ørn
	FW	Birthe Hegstad	23 July 1966 (aged 26)		(Norway) Sprint-Jeløy
	FW	Linda Medalen	17 June 1965 (aged 28)		(Norway) Asker
	FW	Kristin Sandberg	23 March 1972 (aged 21)		(Norway) Asker
	FW	Åse Iren Steine	20 June 1969 (aged 24)		(Norway) Sandviken
