= List of Nigeria women's international footballers =

This is a list of Nigeria women's international footballers who have played for the Nigeria women's national football team since the first match in 1991.

== Players ==
Name	Caps	Goals	National team years	Club(s)
Perpetua Nkwocha	99	80	?–2012	
Maureen Mmadu	101		1993 - 2011	Klepp IL, Kolbotn and Avaldsnes IL
Stella Mbachu	89	20		
Nkiru Okosieme			1991-2003	Rivers Angels, Charlotte Lady Eagles
Ann Chiejine				
Ngozi Ezeocha				
Adaku Okoroafor				
Omo-Love Branch				
Nkechi Mbilitam				
Chioma Ajunwa				
Rita Nwadike				
Ngozi Eucharia Uche				
Florence Omagbemi			1991-2004	
Phoebe Ebimiekumo				
Gift Showemimo				
Mavis Ogun				
Edith Eluma				
Ann Mukoro				
Rachael Yamala				
Yinka Kudaisi			1995-2008	Pelican Stars
Prisca Emeafu				
Mercy Akide				Garden City Queens, Jegede Babes, Ufuoma Babes, Pelican Stars, San Diego Spirit and Hampton Roads Piranhas
Ugochi Opara				
Patience Avre				
Adanna Nwaneri				
Eberechi Opara				
Florence Ajayi				
Gloria Usieta				
Judith Chime				
Florence Iweta				
Nkechi Egbe				
Ifeanyi Chiejine				
Efioanwan Ekpo				
Bunmi Kayode				
Onome Ebi				
Yusuf Olaitan				
Faith Ikidi				
Precious Dede	99			Delta Queens, Bayelsa Queens, Ibom Angels, Arna Bjornar and Al Wahda.
Vera Okolo				
Ayisat Yusuf				
Gift Otuwe				
Ogonna Chukwudi				
Rita Chikwelu				
Chi-Chi Igbo				
Tochukwu Oluehi				
Christie George				
Rebecca Kalu				
Osinachi Ohale				
Helen Ukaonu				
Ebere Orji				Chioma Ajagba
Desire Oparanozie	37 (as at 13 February 2017)	22		Delta Queens, Bayelsa Queens, Guingamp, Atasehir Belediyespor, Rossiyanka and VfL Wolfsburg (women)
Glory Iroka				
Sarah Michael				
Josephine Chukwunonye				
Francisca Ordega				
Ulunma Jerome				
Uchechi Sunday				
Amenze Aighewi				
Alaba Jonathan				
Blessing Edoho				
Courtney Dike				
Iniabasi Umotong				
Halimatu Ayinde				
Ngozi Okobi				
Evelyn Nwabuoku	49 (as at July 2016)			Rivers Angels, Östersunds DFF and En Avant de Guingamp (Women)
Ugo Njoku				
Ibubeleye Whyte				
Loveth Ayila				
Martina Ohadugha				
Cecilia Nku				
Asisat Oshoala				
Ngozi Ebere				
Christy Ohiaeriaku				
Lilian Cole				
Cynthia Uwak				
Tawa Ishola				
Felicia Eze				
Edith Eduviere				
Ajuma Ameh				
Blessing Igbojionu				
Celestina Onyeka				
Akudo Sabi				
Chima Nwosu				
Gift Monday			2019–	FC Robo

== See also ==
- Nigeria women's national football team
