= Chinese Taipei at the FIFA Women's World Cup =

The Chinese Taipei women's national football team has represented Taiwan at the FIFA Women's World Cup on one occasion, in 1991.

== FIFA Women's World Cup record ==
Host Year	Result	GP	W	D	L	GF	GA
(China) 1991	Quarter-finals	4	1	0	3	2	15
(Sweden) 1995	Did not qualify						
(United States) 1999	Did not qualify						
(United States) 2003	Did not qualify						
(China) 2007	Did not qualify						
(Germany) 2011	Did not qualify						
(Canada) 2015	Did not qualify						
(France) 2019	Did not qualify						
(Australia) (New Zealand) 2023	Did not qualify						
(Brazil) 2027	to be determined						
(Costa Rica) (Jamaica) (Mexico) (United States) 2031	to be determined						
(United Kingdom) 2035	to be determined						
Total	1/12	4	1	0	3	2	15

FIFA Women's World Cup history
Year	Round	Date	Opponent	Result	Stadium
(China) 1991	Group stage	17 November	Italy	L 0–5	Jiangmen Stadium, Jiangmen
(China) 1991	Group stage	19 November	Germany	L 0–3	Zhongshan Stadium, Zhongshan
(China) 1991	Group stage	21 November	Nigeria	W 2–0	Jiangmen Stadium, Jiangmen
(China) 1991	Quarter-finals	24 November	United States	L 0–7	New Plaza Stadium, Foshan

== Head-to-head record ==
Opponent	Pld	W	D	L	GF	GA	GD	Win %
Germany	1	0	0	1	0	3	−3	0.00
Italy	1	0	0	1	0	5	−5	0.00
Nigeria	1	1	0	0	2	0	+2	100.00
United States	1	0	0	1	0	7	−7	0.00
Total	4	1	0	3	2	15	−13	25.00

== 1991 FIFA Women's World Cup ==
=== Group C ===
Pos	Team	Pld	W	D	L	GF	GA	GD	Pts	Qualification
1	Germany	3	3	0	0	9	0	+9	6	Advance to knockout stage
2	Italy	3	2	0	1	6	2	+4	4	Advance to knockout stage
3	Chinese Taipei	3	1	0	2	2	8	−6	2	Advance to knockout stage
4	Nigeria	3	0	0	3	0	7	−7	0	

Source: FIFA
Rules for classification: Group stage tiebreakers
17 November 1991
19:45

Chinese Taipei	0–5	Italy
	Report	Ferraguzzi 15'; Marsiletti 29'; Morace 37', 52', 66'

Jiangmen Stadium, Jiangmen
Attendance: 11,000
Referee: Fethi Boucetta (Tunisia)
19 November 1991
19:45

Chinese Taipei	0–3	Germany
	Report	Wiegmann 10' (pen.); Mohr 21', 50'

Zhongshan Stadium, Zhongshan
Attendance: 10,000
Referee: Fethi Boucetta (Tunisia)
21 November 1991
19:45

Chinese Taipei	2–0	Nigeria
Lin 38'; Chou 55'	Report

Jiangmen Stadium, Jiangmen
Attendance: 14,000
Referee: Rafael Medina (El Salvador)

=== Quarterfinals ===
24 November 1991
19:45

United States	7–0	Chinese Taipei
Akers-Stahl 8', 29', 33', 44' (pen.), 48'; Foudy 38'; Biefield 79'	Report

New Plaza Stadium, Foshan
Attendance: 12,000
Referee: Omer Yengo (Congo)

== Goalscorers ==
Player	Goals	1991
Lin Mei-chun	1	1
Chou Tai-ying	1	1
Total	2	2
