= Italy at the FIFA Women's World Cup =

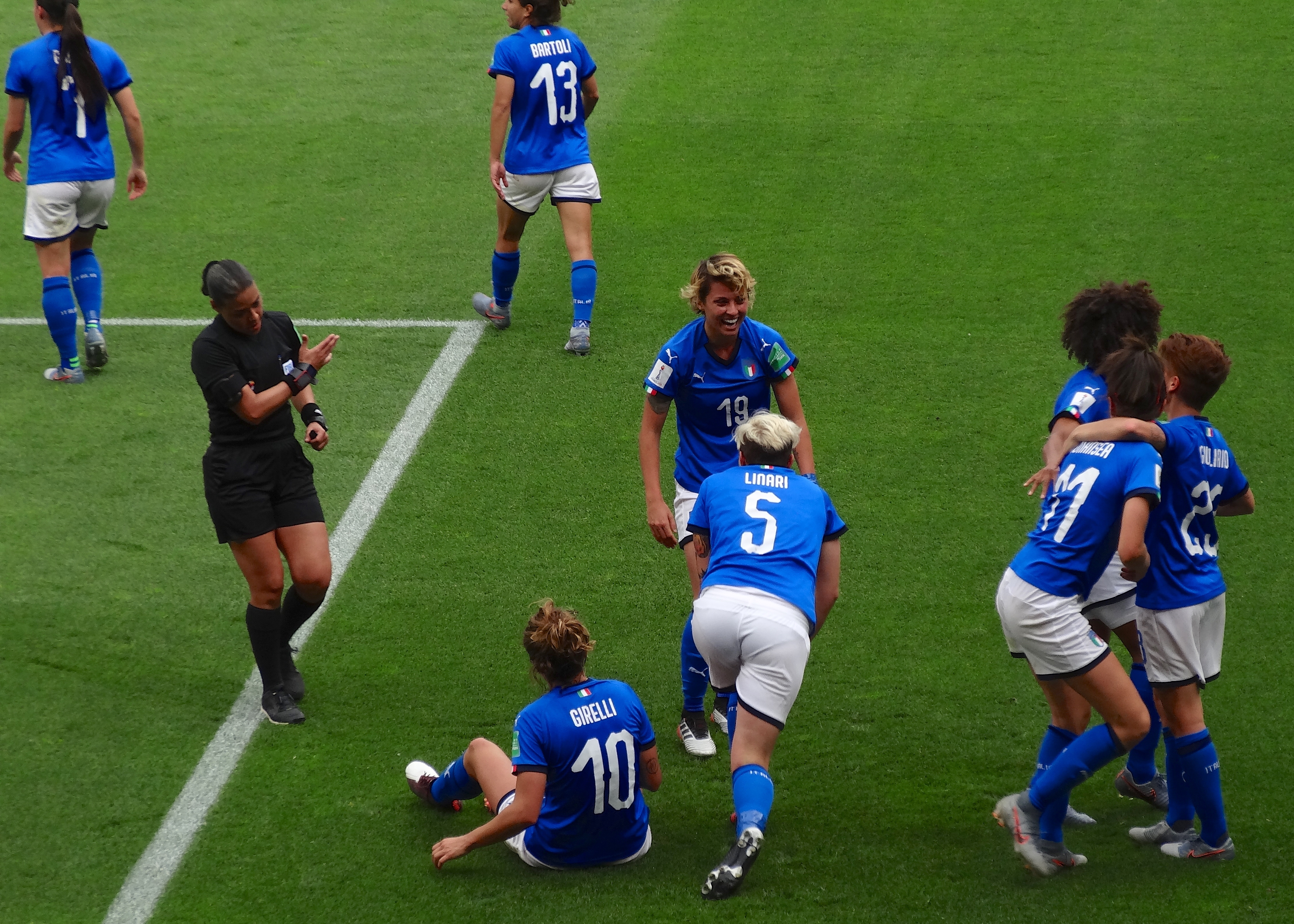
Italy during the 2019 FIFA Women's World Cup match against Australia

Italy have participated four times at the FIFA Women's World Cup: in the inaugural edition of 1991, 1999, 2019 and 2023.

While the men's senior team have won the FIFA World Cup four times, the women's team is yet to win a single edition. Italy participated in the inaugural World Cup of 1991 where, after two wins and a loss in the group stage, they qualified for the quarter-finals, where they lost against Norway. After having failed to qualify for the second edition, Italy played in the 1999 edition where they did not go past the group stages. For the following four editions, between 2003 and 2015, Italy failed to qualify for the World Cup, coming close in 2015 after losing in the final match of qualification to the Netherlands.

In 2019, Italy returned to the World Cup after a 20-year absence. With two wins and a defeat, Italy topped their group and progressed to the round of 16, where they beat China 2–0. However, their World Cup journey came to an end as they were defeated 2–0 by the Netherlands in the quarter-finals.

== FIFA Women's World Cup record ==
=== 1991 FIFA Women's World Cup ===
==== Group C ====
Pos	Team	Pld	W	D	L	GF	GA	GD	Pts	Qualification
1	Germany	3	3	0	0	9	0	+9	6	Advance to knockout stage
2	Italy	3	2	0	1	6	2	+4	4	Advance to knockout stage
3	Chinese Taipei	3	1	0	2	2	8	−6	2	Advance to knockout stage
4	Nigeria	3	0	0	3	0	7	−7	0	

Source: FIFA
Rules for classification: Group stage tiebreakers
17 November 1991
19:45

Chinese Taipei	0–5	Italy
	Report	Ferraguzzi 15'; Marsiletti 29'; Morace 37', 52', 66'

Jiangmen Stadium, Jiangmen
Attendance: 11,000
Referee: Fethi Boucetta (Tunisia)

19 November 1991
15:30

Italy	1–0	Nigeria
Morace 68'	Report

Zhongshan Stadium, Zhongshan
Attendance: 12,000
Referee: Jim McCluskey (Scotland)

21 November 1991
19:45

Italy	0–2	Germany
	Report	Mohr 67'; Unsleber 79'

Zhongshan Stadium, Zhongshan
Attendance: 12,000
Referee: Jim McCluskey (Scotland)

==== Quarter-finals ====
24 November 1991
19:45

Norway	3–2 (a.e.t.)	Italy
Hegstad 22'; Carlsen 67'; Svensson 96' (pen.)	Report	Salmaso 31'; Guarino 80'

Jiangmen Stadium, Jiangmen
Attendance: 13,000
Referee: Rafael Rodríguez Medina (El Salvador)

=== 1999 FIFA Women's World Cup ===
==== Group B ====
Pos	Team	Pld	W	D	L	GF	GA	GD	Pts	Qualification
1	Brazil	3	2	1	0	12	4	+8	7	Advance to knockout stage
2	Germany	3	1	2	0	10	4	+6	5	Advance to knockout stage
3	Italy	3	1	1	1	3	3	0	4	
4	Mexico	3	0	0	3	1	15	−14	0	

Source: FIFA
Rules for classification: Group stage tiebreakers
June 20, 1999
16:00 PDT (UTC−7)

Germany	1–1	Italy
Wiegmann 61' (pen.)	Report	Panico 36'

Rose Bowl, Pasadena
Attendance: 17,100
Referee: Bola Elizabeth Abidoye (Nigeria)

June 24, 1999
17:00 CDT (UTC−5)

Brazil	2–0	Italy
Sissi 3', 63'	Report

Soldier Field, Chicago
Attendance: 65,080
Referee: Gitte Nielsen (Denmark)

June 27, 1999
16:30 EDT (UTC−4)

Mexico	0–2	Italy
	Report	Panico 37'; Zanni 51'

Foxboro Stadium, Foxborough
Attendance: 50,484
Referee: Bola Elizabeth Abidoye (Nigeria)

=== 2019 FIFA Women's World Cup ===
==== Group C ====
Pos	Team	Pld	W	D	L	GF	GA	GD	Pts	Qualification
1	Italy	3	2	0	1	7	2	+5	6	Advance to knockout stage
2	Australia	3	2	0	1	8	5	+3	6	Advance to knockout stage
3	Brazil	3	2	0	1	6	3	+3	6	Advance to knockout stage
4	Jamaica	3	0	0	3	1	12	−11	0	

Source: FIFA
Rules for classification: Group stage tiebreakers
9 June 2019
13:00

Australia	1–2	Italy
Kerr 22'	Report	Bonansea 56', 90+5'

Stade du Hainaut, Valenciennes
Attendance: 15,380
Referee: Melissa Borjas (Honduras)

14 June 2019
18:00

Jamaica	0–5	Italy
	Report	Girelli 12' (pen.), 25', 46'; Galli 71', 81'

Stade Auguste-Delaune, Reims
Attendance: 12,016
Referee: Anna-Marie Keighley (New Zealand)

18 June 2019
21:00

Italy	0–1	Brazil
	Report	Marta 74' (pen.)

Stade du Hainaut, Valenciennes
Attendance: 21,669
Referee: Lucila Venegas (Mexico)

==== Round of 16 ====
25 June 2019
18:00

Italy	2–0	China
Giacinti 15'; Galli 49'	Report

Stade de la Mosson, Montpellier
Attendance: 17,492
Referee: Edina Alves Batista (Brazil)

==== Quarter-finals ====
29 June 2019
15:00

Italy	0–2	Netherlands
	Report	Miedema 70'; Van der Gragt 80'

Stade du Hainaut, Valenciennes
Attendance: 22,600
Referee: Claudia Umpiérrez (Uruguay)

=== 2023 FIFA Women's World Cup ===
==== Group G ====
Pos	Team	Pld	W	D	L	GF	GA	GD	Pts	Qualification
1	Sweden	3	3	0	0	9	1	+8	9	Advance to knockout stage
2	South Africa	3	1	1	1	6	6	0	4	Advance to knockout stage
3	Italy	3	1	0	2	3	8	−5	3	
4	Argentina	3	0	1	2	2	5	−3	1	

Source: FIFA
Rules for classification: Group stage tiebreakers
24 July 2023
18:00 UTC+12

Italy	1–0	Argentina
Girelli 87'	Report

Eden Park, Auckland
Attendance: 30,889
Referee: Melissa Borjas (Honduras)

29 July 2023
19:30 UTC+12

Sweden	5–0	Italy
Ilestedt 39', 50'; Rolfö 44'; Blackstenius 45+1'; Blomqvist 90+5'	Report

Wellington Regional Stadium, Wellington
Attendance: 29,143
Referee: Cheryl Foster (Wales)

2 August 2023
19:00 UTC+12

South Africa	3–2	Italy
Orsi 32' (o.g.); Magaia 67'; Kgatlana 90+2'	Report	Caruso 11' (pen.), 74'

Wellington Regional Stadium, Wellington
Attendance: 14,967
Referee: María Carvajal (Chile)

== Overview ==
=== Tournaments ===
Champions Runners-up Third place Fourth place

FIFA Women's World Cup record
Year	Round	Position	Pld	W	D*	L	GF	GA
(China) 1991	Quarter-finals	6th of 12	4	2	0	2	8	5
(Sweden) 1995	Did not qualify							
(United States) 1999	Group stage	9th of 16	3	1	1	1	3	3
(United States) 2003	Did not qualify							
(China) 2007	Did not qualify							
(Germany) 2011	Did not qualify							
(Canada) 2015	Did not qualify							
(France) 2019	Quarter-finals	7th of 24	5	3	0	2	9	4
(Australia) (New Zealand) 2023	Group stage	22nd of 32	3	1	0	2	3	8
(Brazil) 2027	To be determined							
(Costa Rica) (Jamaica) (Mexico) (United States) 2031	To be determined							
(United Kingdom) 2035	To be determined							
Total	Best: Quarter-finals	4/12	15	7	1	7	23	20
* Draws include knockout matches decided on penalty kicks.

Italy's Women's World Cup record
First Match	Chinese Taipei 0–5 Italy (17 November 1991; Jiangmen, China)
Biggest Win	Chinese Taipei 0–5 Italy (17 November 1991; Jiangmen, China); Jamaica 0–5 Italy (14 June 2019; Reims, France)
Biggest Defeat	Sweden 5–0 Italy (29 July 2023; Wellington, New Zealand)
Best Result	Quarter-finals in 1991 and 2019
Worst Result	Group stage at the 2023 FIFA Women's World Cup

=== Matches ===
List of FIFA Women's World Cup matches
Year	Round	Opponent	Score	Result	Record
1991	Group stage	Chinese Taipei	5–0	Win	1–0–0
1991	Group stage	Nigeria	1–0	Win	2–0–0
1991	Group stage	Germany	0–2	Loss	2–0–1
1991	Quarter-final	Norway	2–3 (a.e.t.)	Loss	2–0–2
1999	Group stage	Germany	1–1	Draw	2–1–2
1999	Group stage	Brazil	0–2	Loss	2–1–3
1999	Group stage	Mexico	2–0	Win	3–1–3
2019	Group stage	Australia	2–1	Win	4–1–3
2019	Group stage	Jamaica	5–0	Win	5–1–3
2019	Group stage	Brazil	0–1	Loss	5–1–4
2019	Round of 16	China	2–0	Win	6–1–4
2019	Quarter-final	Netherlands	0–2	Loss	6–1–5
2023	Group stage	Argentina	1–0	Win	7–1–5
2023	Group stage	Sweden	0–5	Loss	7–1–6
2023	Group stage	South Africa	2–3	Loss	7–1–7

== Head-to-head record ==
Opponent	Pld	W	D	L	GF	GA	GD	Win %
Argentina	1	1	0	0	1	0	+1	100.00
Australia	1	1	0	0	2	1	+1	100.00
Brazil	2	0	0	2	0	3	−3	0.00
China	1	1	0	0	2	0	+2	100.00
Chinese Taipei	1	1	0	0	5	0	+5	100.00
Germany	2	0	1	1	1	3	−2	0.00
Jamaica	1	1	0	0	5	0	+5	100.00
Mexico	1	1	0	0	2	0	+2	100.00
Netherlands	1	0	0	1	0	2	−2	0.00
Nigeria	1	1	0	0	1	0	+1	100.00
Norway	1	0	0	1	2	3	−1	0.00
South Africa	1	0	0	1	2	3	−1	0.00
Sweden	1	0	0	1	0	5	−5	0.00
Total	15	7	1	7	23	20	+3	46.67

== Goalscorers ==
Player	Goals	1991	1999	2019	2023
Cristiana Girelli	4			3	1
Carolina Morace	4	4			
Aurora Galli	3			3	
Barbara Bonansea	2			2	
Arianna Caruso	2				2
Patrizia Panico	2		2		
Feriana Ferraguzzi	1	1			
Valentina Giacinti	1			1	
Rita Guarino	1	1			
Adele Marsiletti	1	1			
Raffaella Salmaso	1	1			
Paola Zanni	1		1		
Total	23	8	3	9	3

Own goals scored for opponents

- Benedetta Orsi (scored for South Africa in 2023)

== See also ==
- Italy at the UEFA Women's Championship
