= 1989 European Competition for Women's Football =

Fußball-Europameisterschaft der Frauen 1989

Tournament details
- Host country: West Germany
- Dates: 28 June – 2 July
- Teams: 4
- Venues: 3 (in 3 host cities)

Final positions
- Champions: West Germany (1st title)
- Runners-up: Norway
- Third place: Sweden
- Fourth place: Italy

Tournament statistics
- Matches played: 4
- Goals scored: 13 (3.25 per match)
- Attendance: 35,500 (8,875 per match)
- Top scorer(s): (Norway) Sissel Grude (West Germany) Ursula Lohn (2 goals each)
- Best player: (West Germany) Doris Fitschen

The 1989 European Competition for Women's Football took place in West Germany. It was won by the hosts in a final against defending champions Norway. Again, the competition began with four qualifying groups, but this time the top two countries qualified for a home-and-away quarter final, before the four winners entered the semi-finals in the host nation.

== Squads ==
For a list of all squads that played in the final tournament, see 1989 European Competition for Women's Football squads

== Bracket ==
Semi-finals
28 June – Siegen
West Germany (p)	1 (4)
Italy	1 (3)
28 June – Lüdenscheid
Sweden	1
Norway	2

Final
2 July – Osnabrück
West Germany	4
Norway	1
Third place play-off
30 June – Osnabrück
Italy	1
Sweden (a.e.t.)	2

== Semifinals ==
28 June 1989

West Germany	1–1 (a.e.t.)	Italy
Neid 57'	Report; DFB Report (in German); FIGC Report (in Italian); Report	Vignotto 72'
Penalties
Kuhlmann (penalty scored); Bindl (penalty scored); Fitschen (penalty scored); Fehrmann (penalty missed); Landers (penalty missed); Voss (penalty missed); Isbert (penalty scored)	4–3	(penalty scored) Ferraguzzi; (penalty missed) Carta; (penalty scored) Morace; (penalty missed) Vignotto; (penalty scored) D'Astolfo; (penalty missed) Iozzelli; (penalty missed) Marsiletti

Leimbachstadion, Siegen
Attendance: 8,000
Referee: Brian Hill (England)
28 June 1989

Sweden	1–2	Norway
Videkull 54'	Report; NFF Report (in Norwegian); SvFF Report (in Swedish); Report	Medalen 1'; Grude 52'

Nattenberg Stadion, Lüdenscheid
Attendance: 3,000
Referee: Cornelius Bakker (Netherlands)

== Third place playoff ==
30 June 1989

Sweden	2–1 (a.e.t.)	Italy
Sundhage 43'; H. Johansson 94'	Report; FIGC Report (in Italian); SvFF Report (in Swedish); Report	Ferraguzzi 28'

Stadion an der Bremer Brücke, Osnabrück
Attendance: 2,500
Referee: Ivan Gregr (Czechoslovakia)

== Final ==
2 July 1989

West Germany	4–1	Norway
Lohn 22', 36'; Mohr 45'; Fehrmann 73'	Report; DFB Report (in German); NFF Report (in Norwegian); Report	Grude 54'

Stadion an der Bremer Brücke, Osnabrück
Attendance: 22,000
Referee: Carlos Silva Valente (Portugal)

== Goalscorers ==
2 goals

- (Norway) Sissel Grude
- (Germany) Ursula Lohn

1 goal

- (Germany) Angelika Fehrmann
- (Germany) Heidi Mohr
- (Germany) Silvia Neid
- (Italy) Feriana Ferraguzzi
- (Italy) Elisabetta Vignotto
- (Norway) Linda Medalen
- (Sweden) Helen Johansson
- (Sweden) Pia Sundhage
- (Sweden) Lena Videkull
