= List of foreign women's football players in Japan =

This is an updated list of women foreign players who have played for football clubs in the Nadeshiko League since 1989-present and WE League since 2020-present

== Australia ==
- Alex Chidiac – JEF United Chiba Ladies - 2021–2022
- Ashleigh Sykes – AS Harima Albion - 2016
- Cheryl Salisbury – Speranza Osaka - 1995–1996
- Clare Polkinghorne – INAC Kobe Leonessa - 2014
- Tameka Yallop – Iga FC Kunoichi Mie - 2014

== Brazil ==
- Pretinha – INAC Kobe Leonessa - 2005–2008
- Roseli – Bunnys Gunma FC White Star - 1995–1997

== Canada ==
- Carrie Serwetnyk – Fujita SC Mercury,Nippon TV Tokyo Verdy Beleza- 1992–1994
- Charmaine Hooper – Iga FC Kunoichi Mie - 1994–1998
- Chelsea Stewart – INAC Kobe Leonessa - 2014
- Holly O'Neill – JEF United Chiba Ladies - 2024–

== Chile ==
- María José Rojas – Orca Kamogawa FC - 2018

== China ==
- Sun Qingmei – Speranza Osaka - 1992–1997
- Wen Lirong – Iga FC Kunoichi Mie - 1994–1999

== Costa Rica ==
- Fabiola Sánchez – Speranza Osaka - 2016

== Indonesia ==
- Helsya Maeisyaroh – FC Ryukyu - 2024–
- Zahra Muzdalifah – Cerezo Osaka Yanmar Ladies - 2023–

== Ireland ==
- Claire Scanlan – OKI FC Winds - 1996–1997

== Jamaica ==
- Vyan Sampson – JEF United Chiba Ladies, INAC Kobe Leonessa - 2023–

== Mexico ==
- Andrea Rodebaugh – Tokyo Shidax LSC - 1993–1996
- Teresa Noyola – Kibi International University Charme Okayama Takahashi - 2016–2017

== Montenegro ==
- Slađana Bulatović – Mynavi Sendai - 2023

== Netherlands ==
- Nathalie Geeris – Suzuyo Shimizu FC Lovely Ladies - 1996–1997

== Nigeria ==
- Uchechi Sunday – Nojima Stella Kanagawa Sagamihara - 2021

== North Korea ==
- Ri Song-A – Cerezo Osaka Yanmar Ladies, Sanfrecce Hiroshima Regina - 2017–

== Norway ==
- Gunn Nyborg – Nikko Securities Dream Ladies - ?
- Hege Riise – Nikko Securities Dream Ladies - 1995–1997
- Heidi Støre – Nikko Securities Dream Ladies - 1995–1999

== Philippines ==
- Jaclyn Sawicki – Chifure AS Elfen Saitama - 2017–2018
- Quinley Quezada – JEF United Chiba Ladies - 2021–2022
- Sarina Bolden – Chifure AS Elfen Saitama - 2021–2022

== Puerto Rico ==
- Gloria Douglas – Iga FC Kunoichi Mie - 2015

== Singapore ==
- Danelle Tan – Nippon TV Tokyo Verdy Beleza - 2025–

== Spain ==
- Ángeles Parejo – Bunnys Gunma FC White Star - 1998
- Mar Prieto – Bunnys Gunma FC White Star - 1998–1999

== Sweden ==
- Anneli Andelén – Suzuyo Shimizu FC Lovely Ladies - 1997–1998
- Kristin Bengtsson – Suzuyo Shimizu FC Lovely Ladies - 1998

== Taiwan ==
- Cheng Ssu-yu – JEF United Chiba Ladies, Okayama Yunogo Belle - 2021–2023
- Chou Tai-ying – Suzuyo Shimizu FC Lovely Ladies - 1989–1993
- Michelle Pao – Nojima Stella Kanagawa - 2016–2017
- Shieh Su-jean – Suzuyo Shimizu FC Lovely Ladies - 1991
- Su Yu-hsuan – Okayama Yunogo Belle - 2020–2021

== Thailand ==
- Chatchawan Rodthong – Mynavi Sendai - 2023–2024
- Kanjana Sungngoen – Speranza Osaka - 2013
- Naphat Seesraum – Speranza Osaka - 2013
- Phornphirun Philawan – Mynavi Sendai - 2022
- Pitsamai Sornsai – Speranza Osaka - 2013

== United States ==
- Becca Moros – INAC Kobe Leonessa - 2012–2014
- Bev Yanez – INAC Kobe Leonessa - 2012–2014
- Cindy Mosley – Suzuyo Shimizu FC Lovely Ladies - 1997–1998
- Gretchen Zigante – Fujita SC Mercury -
- Janine Szpara – Shiroki FC Serena - 1995–199?
- Jennifer Lalor – Shiroki FC Serena - 1992–1994
- Jill Rutten – Fujita SC Mercury - 1997–1998
- Keri Sanchez – Suzuyo Shimizu FC Lovely Ladies - 1999
- Tammy Pearman – OKI FC Winds - ?

== See also ==
- List of Japan international footballers born outside Japan
