= Rachael Yamala =

Nigerian footballer

Personal information
- Date of birth: 12 February 1975 (age 51)
- Position: Midfielder

Senior career*
Years	Team	Apps	(Gls)
- Kakanfo Babes

International career^{‡}
- Nigeria
- * Club domestic league appearances and goals ‡ National team caps and goals as of 16 November 1991 (before the 1991 FIFA Women's World Cup)

Rachael Yamala (born 12 February 1975) is a former football midfielder for the Nigeria women's national football team. She was part of the team at the inaugural 1991 FIFA Women's World Cup. She played her last match for Nigeria on 21 November 1991. At the club level she played for Kakanfo Babes in Nigeria.

== International career ==
She was among the team played at the 1991 women's world cup against Taiwan.

== Notability ==
Rachael Yamala is one of the pioneering members of the country's first-ever women's national team to participate in the FIFA Women's World Cup in 1991. At just 16 years old, she was selected as a midfielder for the Super Falcons and featured in two group-stage matches during the inaugural tournament in China. She wore jersey #18, and played a total of 66 minutes as a substitute midfielder. Her generation included names like Florence Omagbemi, Ann Chiejine, Chioma Ajunwa, Ann Mukoro, Ngozi Ezeocha, and others.
