= Paola Bonato =

Italian footballer

Personal information
- Date of birth: 31 January 1961 (age 65)
- Place of birth: Mozzecane, Italy
- Position: Defender

Senior career*
Years	Team	Apps	(Gls)
1975–1982	Verona		
1982–1987	Trani		
1987–1989	Lazio		
1989–1993	Reggiana		
1993–1994	Lugo		

International career
1983–1991	Italy	71	(0)
Medal record
Italy
UEFA Women's Championship
Bronze medal – third place	Norway 1987
- * Club domestic league appearances and goals

Paola Bonato (born 31 January 1961) is an Italian former footballer who played as a defender for the Italy women's national football team. She accrued 71 caps between 1983 and 1991, and was part of the team at four editions of the UEFA Women's Championship and at the inaugural 1991 FIFA Women's World Cup. In a 19-year career at club level she won seven Serie A winner's medals and three Coppa Italia winner's medals, while playing for Trani, Lazio and Reggiana.

== Club career ==
Bonato began playing for Verona when she was 14 years old. She continued to live and work in Mozzecane after transferring to Trani in 1982, where she won Serie A three times and the Coppa Italia once. She also won Serie A in her first season after moving to Lazio, then won three more Serie A titles and two more Coppa Italias with Reggiana. She finished her career after spending one season with newly-promoted Serie A club Lugo.

== International career ==
Bonato made her first appearance for the national team on 24 April 1983, a 3–0 1984 European Competition for Women's Football qualifying win over France at Stadio Romeo Menti in Vicenza. Her 71st and final appearance was the 3–2 (after extra time) 1991 FIFA Women's World Cup quarter final defeat by Norway at Jiangmen Stadium. In between she had played in the semi-finals of the 1984, 1987, 1989 and 1991 editions of the UEFA Women's Championship.

Bonato may have collected more than 71 national team appearances, but her employer – the Municipality of Mozzecane – had refused to grant her any additional time off.

== Style of play ==
The Dizionario del Calcio Italiano described Bonato as a gritty and determined marker, who was not elegant but was hard to get past. She was versatile enough to play in any of the defensive positions. In May 2020, Antonella Carta described Bonato as the most difficult opponent she had faced.

== Career statistics ==
Appearances and goals by national team and year
National team	Year	Apps	Goals
Italy	1983	6	0
Italy	1984	13	0
Italy	1985	12	0
Italy	1986	8	0
Italy	1987	4	0
Italy	1988	9	0
Italy	1989	5	0
Italy	1990	4	0
Italy	1991	10	0
Total		71	0

== Honours ==
Trani

- Serie A: 1984, 1985, 1985–86
- Coppa Italia: 1983

Lazio

- Serie A: 1987–88

Reggiana

- Serie A: 1989–90, 1990–91, 1992–93
- Coppa Italia: 1991–92, 1992–93

Italy

- Mundialito: 1984, 1986
