= Football at the 2003 All-Africa Games – Women's tournament =

2003 Women's All-Africa Games football tournament
Tournament details
- Host country: Nigeria
- City: Abuja
- Dates: 3–16 October 2003
- Teams: 8 (from 1 confederation)
- Venue: 3 (in 3 host cities)

Final positions
- Champions: Nigeria (1st title)
- Runners-up: South Africa
- Third place: Cameroon
- Fourth place: Mali

Tournament statistics
- Matches played: 16
- Goals scored: 51 (3.19 per match)

The 2003 All-Africa Games football – Women's tournament was the 1st edition of the African Games men's football tournament for women. The football tournament was held in Abuja, Nigeria between 3–16 October 2003 as part of the 2003 All-Africa Games. It was played by players under the age of 23. Nigeria won the final against South Africa.

== Participating teams ==
No qualifying took part, but teams were invited. Nigeria and Ghana were seeded and put in different groups. Ghana then withdraw on short notice and were to be replaced by Nigeria's A national team, but that was withdrawn later too, due to lack of funding from the Nigerian FA. DR Congo then took part at a last minute replacement.

- Algeria
- Cameroon
- DR Congo
- Ethiopia
- Mali
- Nigeria (hosts)
- South Africa
- Zimbabwe

== Final tournament ==
All times given as local time (UTC+1)

=== Group stage ===
Key to colours in group tables
Teams that advanced to the semifinals

==== Group A ====
Team	Pld	W	D	L	GF	GA	GD	Pts
Nigeria	3	3	0	0	13	0	+13	9
Cameroon	3	1	1	1	5	2	+3	4
Zimbabwe	3	1	1	1	5	6	−1	4
Ethiopia	3	0	0	3	0	15	−15	0

3 October 2003

Nigeria	5–0	Zimbabwe
Nwadike 5', 87'; Ekwerike 37', 55' (pen.); Igbojionu 52'

Lagos
3 October 2003

Ethiopia	0–3	Cameroon
		Bebeto 57'; Ngono 72'; Bella 87'

Lagos

6 October 2003

Zimbabwe	4–0	Ethiopia
Mpalo; Moyo; Ndlovu

Lagos
6 October 2003

Cameroon	0–1	Nigeria
		Nwadike 67'

Lagos

9 October 2003

Zimbabwe	1–1	Cameroon
Goal		Goal

Lagos
9 October 2003

Nigeria	7–0	Ethiopia
		Ekwerike; Ameh; Igbojionu; Nwadike

Lagos

==== Group B ====
Team	Pld	W	D	L	GF	GA	GD	Pts
South Africa	3	3	0	0	9	1	+8	9
Mali	3	1	1	1	3	2	+1	4
DR Congo	3	1	1	1	5	6	−1	4
Algeria	3	0	0	3	3	11	−8	0

4 October 2003

DR Congo	5–2	Algeria

Kaduna
4 October 2003

South Africa	2–0	Mali

Kaduna

7 October 2003

Algeria	1–3	South Africa
Imloul		Phewa; Jijare (pen.)

Kaduna
7 October 2003

Mali	0–0	DR Congo

Kaduna

10 October 2003

Algeria	0–3	Mali

Kaduna
10 October 2003

DR Congo	0–4	South Africa

Kaduna

=== Knockout stage ===
Semifinals
12 October – Lagos
Nigeria	3
Mali	1
12 October – Kaduna
South Africa	3
Cameroon	1

Final
16 October – Abuja
Nigeria	1
South Africa	0
Third place
15 October – Kaduna
Mali	0
Cameroon	1

==== Semifinals ====
12 October 2003

Nigeria	3–1	Mali

Lagos

12 October 2003

South Africa	3–1	Cameroon

Kaduna

==== Third-place match ====
15 October 2003

Mali	0–1	Cameroon

Kaduna

==== Final ====
16 October 2003

Nigeria	1–0	South Africa
Igbojionu 85'

National Stadium, Abuja

== Final ranking ==
Pos	Team	Pld	W	D	L	GF	GA	GD	Pts	Final result
1st place, gold medalist(s)	Nigeria (H)	5	5	0	0	17	1	+16	15	Gold Medal
2nd place, silver medalist(s)	South Africa	5	4	0	1	12	3	+9	12	Silver Medal
3rd place, bronze medalist(s)	Cameroon	5	2	1	2	7	5	+2	7	Bronze Medal
4	Mali	5	1	1	3	4	6	−2	4	Fourth place
5	DR Congo	3	1	1	1	5	6	−1	4	Eliminated in group stage
6	Zimbabwe	3	1	1	1	5	6	−1	4	Eliminated in group stage
7	Algeria	3	0	0	3	3	11	−8	0	Eliminated in group stage
8	Ethiopia	3	0	0	3	0	15	−15	0	Eliminated in group stage

(H) Hosts

== See also ==
- Football at the 2003 All-Africa Games – Men's tournament
