= Nwaiwu =

Nwaiwu is a Nigerian surname. Notable people with the surname include:

- Chibuike Nwaiwu (born 2003), Nigerian football; centre-back
- Diana Nwaiwu (born 1973), Nigerian footballer; goalkeeper
- Febechi Nwaiwu (born 2004), American football guard
