= Lan Lan-fen =

Chinese football player from Taiwan

Personal information
- Date of birth: 22 November 1973 (age 52)
- Position: Defender

Senior career*
Years	Team	Apps	(Gls)
- Ming Chuan University

International career^{‡}
- Chinese Taipei
- * Club domestic league appearances and goals ‡ National team caps and goals as of 16 November 1991 (before the 1991 FIFA Women's World Cup)

Lan Lan-fen (Chinese: 藍藍芬, born 22 November 1973) is a Taiwanese footballer who played as a defender for the Chinese Taipei women's national football team. She was part of the team at the 1991 FIFA Women's World Cup. On club level she played for Ming Chuan University in Taiwan.
