= Chen Shwu-ju =

Chinese football player from Taiwan

Personal information
- Date of birth: 13 March 1971 (age 55)
- Position: Defender

Senior career*
Years	Team	Apps	(Gls)
- Ming Chuan University

International career^{‡}
- Chinese Taipei
- * Club domestic league appearances and goals ‡ National team caps and goals as of 16 November 1991 (before the 1991 FIFA Women's World Cup)

Chen Shwu-ju (Chinese: 陳淑珠, born 13 March 1971) is a Taiwanese footballer who played as a defender for the Chinese Taipei women's national football team. She was part of the team at the 1991 FIFA Women's World Cup. At the club level she played for Ming Chuan University in Taiwan.
