= Chong Tsu-pin =

Taiwanese football manager

Managerial career
- Years: Team
- 1991: Chinese Taipei Women

Chong Tsu-pin (Chinese: 張子濱; pinyin: Zhāng Zǐbīn) is a Taiwanese football manager.

== Career ==
Chong was the head coach of the Chinese Taipei women's national team at the 1991 FIFA Women's World Cup.
