= Hong Li-chyn =

Chinese football player from Taiwan

Personal information
- Date of birth: 23 May 1970 (age 56)
- Position: Goalkeeper

Senior career*
Years	Team	Apps	(Gls)
- Taiwan PE College

International career^{‡}
- Chinese Taipei
- * Club domestic league appearances and goals ‡ National team caps and goals as of 16 November 1991 (before the 1991 FIFA Women's World Cup)

Hong Li-chyn (Chinese: 洪麗琴, born 23 May 1970) is a Taiwanese women's footballer who played as a goalkeeper for the Chinese Taipei women's national football team. She was part of the team at the 1991 FIFA Women's World Cup. At the club level she played for Taiwan PE College in Taiwan.
