= Claudia Sonn =

German footballer

Personal information
- Date of birth: 7 January 1966 (age 60)
- Position: Midfielder

International career
Years	Team	Apps	(Gls)
- Germany

Claudia Sonn (born 7 January 1966) is a German women's international footballer who plays as a midfielder. She is a member of the Germany women's national football team. She was part of the team at the 1989 European Competition for Women's Football.
