= Ingrid Johansson =

Swedish footballer (born 1965)

Personal information
- Date of birth: 9 July 1965 (age 61)
- Position: Midfielder

Senior career*
Years	Team	Apps	(Gls)
- Jitex BK

International career^{‡}
	Sweden	28	(3)
- * Club domestic league appearances and goals ‡ National team caps and goals as of 2017

Ingrid Johansson (born 9 July 1965) is a Swedish footballer who played as a midfielder for the Sweden women's national football team. She was part of the team at the 1989 European Competition for Women's Football and 1991 FIFA Women's World Cup. At the club level she played for Jitex BK in Sweden.
