= Lin Mei-jih =

Chinese football player from Taiwan

Personal information
- Date of birth: 27 February 1972 (age 54)
- Position: Midfielder

Senior career*
Years	Team	Apps	(Gls)
- Ming Chuan University

International career^{‡}
- Chinese Taipei
- * Club domestic league appearances and goals ‡ National team caps and goals as of 16 November 1991 (before the 1991 FIFA Women's World Cup)

Lin Mei-jih (Chinese: 林美智, born 27 February 1972) is a Taiwanese footballer who played as a midfielder who played for the Chinese Taipei women's national football team. She was part of the team at the 1991 FIFA Women's World Cup. On club level she played for Ming Chuan University in Taiwan.
