= Wu Min-hsun =

Chinese football player from Taiwan

Personal information
- Date of birth: 26 September 1974 (age 52)
- Position: Defender

Senior career*
Years	Team	Apps	(Gls)
- Jinwen College

International career^{‡}
- Chinese Taipei
- * Club domestic league appearances and goals ‡ National team caps and goals as of 16 November 1991 (before the 1991 FIFA Women's World Cup)

Wu Min-hsun (Chinese: 吳名薰, born 26 September 1974) is a Taiwanese footballer who played as a defender for the Chinese Taipei women's national football team. She was part of the team at the 1991 FIFA Women's World Cup. On club level she played for Jinwen College in Taiwan.
