= Lo Chu-yin =

Chinese football player from Taiwan

Personal information
- Date of birth: 6 October 1965 (age 61)
- Position: Defender

Senior career*
Years	Team	Apps	(Gls)
- Mulan

International career^{‡}
- Chinese Taipei
- * Club domestic league appearances and goals ‡ National team caps and goals as of 16 November 1991 (before the 1991 FIFA Women's World Cup)

Lo Chu-yin (Chinese: 羅居銀, born 6 October 1965) is a Taiwanese footballer who played as a defender for the Chinese Taipei women's national football team. She was part of the team at the 1991 FIFA Women's World Cup. In club-level matches she played for Mulan in Taiwan.
