= Beate Wendt =

German footballer

Personal information
- Date of birth: 21 September 1971 (age 55)
- Position: Midfielder

Senior career*
Years	Team	Apps	(Gls)
- SC Poppenbüttel

International career^{‡}
	Germany	4	
- * Club domestic league appearances and goals ‡ National team caps and goals as of 16 November 1991 (before the 1991 FIFA Women's World Cup)

Beate Wendt (born 21 September 1971) is a German women's international footballer who plays as a midfielder. She is a member of the Germany women's national football team. She was part of the team at the 1991 FIFA Women's World Cup. On club level she plays for SC Poppenbüttel in Germany.
