= Fabiana Correra =

Italian footballer

Personal information
- Date of birth: 1 October 1967 (age 59)
- Position: Midfielder

Senior career*
Years	Team	Apps	(Gls)
- Turris

International career^{‡}
- Italy
- * Club domestic league appearances and goals ‡ National team caps and goals as of 16 November 1991 (before the 1991 FIFA Women's World Cup)

Fabiana Correra (born 1 October 1967) is an Italian footballer who played as a midfielder for the Italy women's national football team. She was part of the team at the inaugural 1991 FIFA Women's World Cup. On club level she played for Turris in Italy.
