= Diana Nwaiwu =

Nigerian footballer

Personal information
- Full name: Diana Esther Nwaiwu
- Date of birth: 10 October 1973 (age 53)
- Position: Defender

Senior career*
Years	Team	Apps	(Gls)
- Kakanfo Babes

International career^{‡}
- Nigeria
- * Club domestic league appearances and goals ‡ National team caps and goals as of 5 June 1995 (before the 1995 FIFA Women's World Cup)

Diana Esther Nwaiwu (born 10 October 1973) is a Nigerian former footballer who played as a goalkeeper for the Nigeria women's national football team. She was part of the team at the inaugural 1991 FIFA Women's World Cup as well as the 1995 FIFA Women's World Cup. At the club level, she played for Kakanfo Babes in Nigeria.
