= Gift Showemimo =

Nigerian footballer

Personal information
- Date of birth: 24 May 1974 (age 52)
- Position: Forward

Senior career*
| Years | Team | Apps | (Gls) |
- Kakanfo Babes

International career^{‡}
- Nigeria
- * Club domestic league appearances and goals ‡ National team caps and goals as of 16 November 1991 (before the 1991 FIFA Women's World Cup)

Gift Showemimo (born 24 May 1974) is a Nigerian former footballer who played as a forward for the Nigeria women's national football team. She was part of the team at the inaugural 1991 FIFA Women's World Cup. At the club level, she played for Kakanfo Babes in Nigeria.
