= Trine Stenberg Tviberg =

Norwegian footballer (born 1969)

Medal record

Representing Norway

Women's football

World Cup
Silver medal – second place	China 1991	Team

Trine Dyveke Stenberg Tviberg (born 6 December 1969) is a former Norwegian football player who played for the Norway women's national football team.

== Career ==
Born on 6 December 1969, Tviberg played a total of 34 matches for the Norwegian national team.

She played on the Norwegian team that won silver medals at the 1991 FIFA Women's World Cup in China.
