= Blessing Igbojionu =

Nigerian footballer

Personal information
- Date of birth: 26 September 1982 (age 44)
- Place of birth: Nigeria
- Height: 1.68 m (5 ft 6 in)
- Position: Forward

Senior career*
Years	Team	Apps	(Gls)
2004	Pelican Stars		

International career
2004	Nigeria	0 (?)	(0)
- * Club domestic league appearances and goals

Blessing Igbojionu // (born 26 September 1982) is a Nigerian former footballer who played as a forward for the Nigeria women's national football team.

She represented Nigeria at the 2004 Summer Olympics in Athens, Greece. At the club level, she played for Pelican Stars.

== See also ==
- Nigeria at the 2004 Summer Olympics
- List of Nigeria women's international footballers
