= Mavis Ogun =

Nigerian footballer

Personal information
- Date of birth: 24 August 1973 (age 53)
- Position: Defender

International career^{‡}
Years	Team	Apps	(Gls)
- Nigeria
- ‡ National team caps and goals as of 19 June 1999 (before the 1999 FIFA Women's World Cup)

Mavis Ogun (born 24 August 1973) is a Nigerian former footballer who played as a defender for the Nigeria women's national football team. She was part of the team at the 1991 FIFA Women's World Cup, 1995 FIFA Women's World Cup and 1999 FIFA Women's World Cup.
