= Maria Mariotti =

Italian footballer

Personal information
- Date of birth: 27 April 1964 (age 62)
- Position: Midfielder

Senior career*
Years	Team	Apps	(Gls)
- Reggiana

International career^{‡}
- Italy
- * Club domestic league appearances and goals ‡ National team caps and goals as of 16 November 1991 (before the 1991 FIFA Women's World Cup)

Maria Mariotti (born 27 April 1964) is an Italian former footballer who played as a midfielder for the Italy women's national football team. She was part of the team at the 1991 FIFA Women's World Cup. On club level she played for Reggiana in Italy.
