= Omo-Love Branch =

Nigerian footballer

Personal information
- Date of birth: 10 January 1974 (age 52)
- Position: Defender

International career^{‡}
Years	Team	Apps	(Gls)
- Nigeria
- ‡ National team caps and goals as of 5 June 1995 (before the 1995 FIFA Women's World Cup)

Omo-Love Branch (born 10 January 1974) is a former footballer who played as a defender for the Nigeria women's national football team. She was part of the team at the inaugural 1991 FIFA Women's World Cup as well as the 1995 FIFA Women's World Cup.
