= Angelika Fehrmann =

German women's international footballer

Personal information
- Date of birth: 6 January 1964 (age 62)
- Position: Midfielder

International career
Years	Team	Apps	(Gls)
- Germany

Angelika Fehrmann (German pronunciation: [aŋˈɡeːlika ˈfeːɐ̯man]; born 6 January 1964) was a German women's international footballer who played as a midfielder. She was a member of the Germany women's national football team at the 1989 European Competition for Women's Football.
