= Maura Furlotti =

Italian footballer (born 1957)

Personal information
- Date of birth: 12 September 1957 (age 69)
- Position: Defender

Senior career*
Years	Team	Apps	(Gls)
- Lazio

International career^{‡}
- Italy
- * Club domestic league appearances and goals ‡ National team caps and goals as of 16 November 1991 (before the 1991 FIFA Women's World Cup)

Maura Furlotti (born 12 September 1957) is an Italian footballer who played as a defender for the Italy women's national football team. She was part of the team at the 1991 FIFA Women's World Cup. At club level she played for Lazio in Italy.
