= Nkechi Mbilitam =

Nigerian footballer

Personal information
- Date of birth: 5 April 1974 (age 52)
- Position: Midfielder

International career^{‡}
Years	Team	Apps	(Gls)
- Nigeria
- ‡ National team caps and goals as of 5 June 1995 (before the 1995 FIFA Women's World Cup)

Nkechi Mbilitam (born 5 April 1974) is a Nigerian former footballer who played as a midfielder for the Nigeria women's national football team. She was part of the team at the inaugural 1991 FIFA Women's World Cup and the 1995 FIFA Women's World Cup.
