= Stefania Antonini =

Italian footballer

Personal information
- Date of birth: 10 October 1970 (age 56)
- Place of birth: Bellinzona, Switzerland
- Position: Goalkeeper

Senior career*
| Years | Team | Apps | (Gls) |
| 1983–1989 | Ascoli | | |
| 1989–1993 | Reggiana | | |
| 1993–1994 | GEAS | | |
| 1994–1995 | Lugo | | |
| 1995–1996 | Verona | | |
| 1996–1999 | Modena | | |

International career^{‡}
| 1990–1996 | Italy | 32 | (0) |
Medal record
Italy
UEFA Women's Championship
| Silver medal – second place | Italy 1993 |
- * Club domestic league appearances and goals as of 13:26, 24 March 2018 (UTC) ‡ National team caps and goals as of 26, 24 March 2018 (UTC)

Stefania Antonini (born 10 October 1970) is an Italian former footballer who played as a goalkeeper for the Italy women's national football team. She was the national team's first choice goalkeeper at the 1991 FIFA Women's World Cup. At club level she collected five women's Serie A winner's medals and three Coppa Italia winner's medals.

== Club career ==
Swiss-born Antonini began playing football at 12 years old when her family returned to Italy and settled in Teramo. She became Ascoli's starting goalkeeper aged 13 and helped the club to promotion from Serie C to Serie A. In 1989 she made her first transfer to Zambelli Reggiana, where an experienced team containing Carolina Morace, Elisabetta Vignotto and Anne O'Brien captured Antonini's first league title. She won a further four league titles and three national cups but retired at 29 years old, dissatisfied that her teams kept going bust and unhappy with the general lack of career prospects on offer for elite female footballers in Italy.

== International career ==
Antonini was drafted into the Italy women's national football team in 1990, following good form for title-winning Reggiana and the suspension of Eva Russo. She made her debut in August 1990 in a 4–1 win over England, played at Wembley Stadium as a curtain raiser for the 1990 FA Charity Shield. At the 1991 FIFA Women's World Cup, Antonini was ever-present as Italy reached the quarter-final and lost 3–2 to Norway after extra time. At UEFA Women's Euro 1993 hosts Italy reached the final and suffered another defeat by Norway, 1–0 this time. Antonini had been replaced in the team for the tournament by Giorgia Brenzan, with whom she enjoyed a friendly rivalry for the national team goalkeeper position. She returned to the number one role for UEFA Women's Euro 1995, but yet another defeat by Norway in the second-round cost the Italians a place at the 1995 FIFA Women's World Cup. In December 1996 Antonini won the last of her 32 caps in a 0–0 draw with Germany.

== Playing style ==
According to the Dizionario del Calcio Italiano, Antonini was a goalkeeper of rare talent. She was described as more instinctive and spectacular than her longstanding rival Giorgia Brenzan, and capable of making extraordinary acrobatic saves. However, her extroverted style sometimes left her prone to lapses in concentration.

== Honours ==
=== Club ===
Reggiana

- Serie A (3): 1989–90, 1990–91, 1992–93
- Coppa Italia (2): 1991–92, 1992–1993

GEAS

- Coppa Italia (1): 1993–94

Modena

- Serie A (2): 1996–97, 1997–98
- Italian Women's Super Cup (1): 1997

=== International ===
Italy

- UEFA Women's Championship Runner-up: 1993
