= Edith Eluma =

Nigerian footballer

Personal information
- Date of birth: 27 September 1958 (age 68)
- Position: Defender

Senior career*
Years	Team	Apps	(Gls)
- Princess Jegede

International career^{‡}
- Nigeria
- * Club domestic league appearances and goals ‡ National team caps and goals as of 16 November 1991 (before the 1991 FIFA Women's World Cup)

Edith Eluma (born 27 September 1958) is a Nigerian former footballer who played as a defender for the Nigeria women's national football team. She was part of the team at the first FIFA Women's World Cup held in 1991. At the club level, she played for Princess Jegede in Nigeria.
