= Dolores Prestifillipo =

Italian footballer and manager (born 1961)

Dolores Prestifilippo
Personal information
- Date of birth: 16 January 1961 (age 65)
- Place of birth: Trieste, Italy
- Position: Centre back

Senior career*
Years	Team	Apps	(Gls)
- ACF Milan

International career
	Italy	14	(0)
- * Club domestic league appearances and goals

Dolores Prestifilippo (born 16 January 1961) is an Italian former professional footballer and manager who coached Como.
