= Katrine Nysveen =

Norwegian international footballer (born 1973)

Personal information
- Date of birth: 26 November 1973 (age 52)
- Position: Defender

Senior career*
Years	Team	Apps	(Gls)
- Setskog/Høland FK
- Asker

International career
1989	Norway U16	4	(3)
1992–1995	Norway U20	16	(2)
1993–1995	Norway	21	(0)
- * Club domestic league appearances and goals

Katrine Nysveen (born 26 November 1973) is a retired Norwegian footballer who played as a defender.

She was capped 21 times for the Norway national team. She was part of the victorious team at the 1993 UEFA European Championship. She was a candidate for the 1995 FIFA Women's World Cup, but was ultimately not selected, having been capped for the last time in the 1995 Algarve Cup.

On club level she played for Setskog/Høland FK and Asker in Norway.
