= Anna Mega =

Italian footballer (born 1962)

Anna Maria Mega
Personal information
- Date of birth: 21 October 1962 (age 64)
- Position: Midfielder

Senior career*
Years	Team	Apps	(Gls)
- Reggiana

International career^{‡}
- Italy
- * Club domestic league appearances and goals ‡ National team caps and goals as of 16 November 1991 (before the 1991 FIFA Women's World Cup)

Anna Maria Mega (born 21 October 1962) is an Italian footballer who played as a midfielder for the Italy women's national football team. She was part of the team at the 1991 FIFA Women's World Cup. On club level she played for Reggiana in Italy.
