= Shieh Su-jean =

Chinese football player from Taiwan

Personal information
- Date of birth: 10 February 1969 (age 57)
- Position: Midfielder

Senior career*
Years	Team	Apps	(Gls)
- Suzuyo Shimizu F.C. Lovely Ladies

International career^{‡}
- Chinese Taipei
- * Club domestic league appearances and goals ‡ National team caps and goals as of 16 November 1991 (before the 1991 FIFA Women's World Cup)

Shieh Su-jean (Chinese: 謝素貞, born 10 February 1969) is a Taiwanese footballer who played as a midfielder for the Chinese Taipei women's national football team. She was part of the team at the 1991 FIFA Women's World Cup. On club level she played for Suzuyo Shimizu F.C. Lovely Ladies in Japan.
