= Marina Cordenons =

Italian footballer

Personal information
- Date of birth: 12 January 1969 (age 57)
- Position: Defender

Senior career*
Years	Team	Apps	(Gls)
- Pordenone

International career^{‡}
- Italy
- * Club domestic league appearances and goals ‡ National team caps and goals as of 16 November 1991 (before the 1991 FIFA Women's World Cup)

Marina Cordenons (born 12 January 1969) is an Italian footballer who played as a defender for the Italy women's national football team. She was part of the team at the 1991 FIFA Women's World Cup. On club level she played for Pordenone in Italy.
