= Ann Chiejine =

Nigerian footballer

Personal information
- Date of birth: 2 February 1974 (age 52)
- Place of birth: Nigeria
- Position: Goalkeeper

International career
Years	Team	Apps	(Gls)
1991–	Nigeria	14	

Ann Agumanu-Chiejine (born 2 February 1974) is a Nigerian former football goalkeeper who was Nigeria’s first female goalkeeper, born in Mbaise, lmo state, She played for the Nigeria women's national football team at the inaugural 1991 FIFA Women's World Cup and 2000 Summer Olympics. She is an assistant coach for the U17 Nigerian women's team.

== Honours ==
Nigeria

Player

- African Women's Championship (4): 1998, 2000, 2002, 2004

Assistant Coach

- African Women's Championship winner: 2016

== See also ==
- Nigeria at the 2000 Summer Olympics
