= Annette Thychosen =

Danish footballer (born 1968)

Personal information
- Full name: Annette Kristina Thychosen
- Date of birth: 30 August 1968 (age 58)
- Place of birth: Vejle, Denmark
- Position: Forward

Youth career
- 1973–1980: Vejle FC
- 1980–1983: Hover

Senior career*
Years	Team	Apps	(Gls)
1983–1995	Vejle B	234	

International career
1988–1994	Denmark	46	(13)
- * Club domestic league appearances and goals

Annette Kristina Thychosen (born 30 August 1968) is a Danish footballer who played as a forward for the Denmark national team. She was part of the team at the 1991 FIFA World Cup, UEFA European Championship 1991, and UEFA European Championship 1993. At club level she played for Vejle B. Thychosen earned 46 caps and scored 13 goals for the national team.

== Club career ==
Thychosen played youth football with Vejle FC for seven years from she was 5 to 12 years old. She moved to Hover for three years, before joining the senior team at Vejle B at 15 years old in 1983. Thychosen spent her club career with Vejle B before retiring her active playing career in 1995.
