= Zhongshan Sports Center Stadium =

Sports venue in Zhongshan, Guangdong, China

Coordinates: 22°30′36″N 113°23′00″E

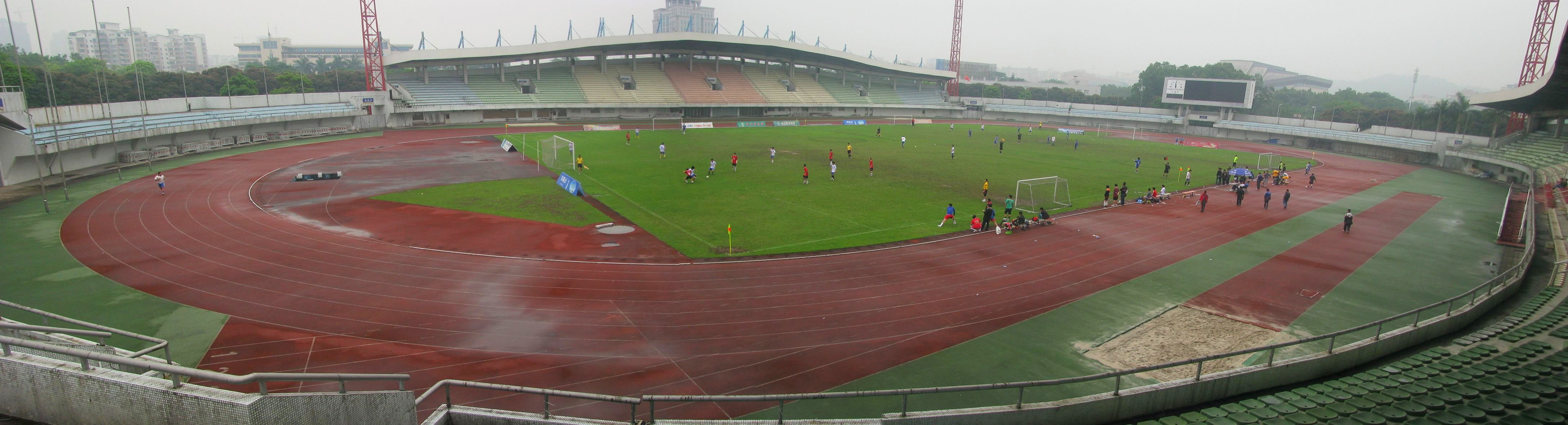
Zhongshan Sports Center Stadium in 2012

Zhongshan Sports Center Stadium (Chinese: 中山体育中心体育场) is a multi-use stadium in Zhongshan, Guangdong, China. It is currently used mostly for association football matches and was one of the six stadiums used for the 1991 FIFA Women's World Cup. The stadium has a capacity of 12,000 people. The stadium is an all-seater with multi-colour seats. It also has an all-weather track and field surface.

Concerts are also held there with acts from Hong Kong and from regional Guangzhou capital city. Unusual for concertgoers, is that a platform is set up in one end towards the centerline and the stage is just slightly higher than temporary seats, which are also on the platform.

== 1991 FIFA Women's World Cup matches ==
| Date | Competition | Team | Res | Team | Crowd |
|---|---|---|---|---|---|
| 19 November 1991 | Group C | Italy | 1–0 | Nigeria | 12,000 |
| 19 November 1991 | Group C | Chinese Taipei | 0–3 | Germany | 10,000 |
| 21 November 1991 | Group C | Italy | 0–2 | Germany | 12,000 |
| 27 November 1991 | Quarter-finals | Denmark | 1–2 (a.e.t) | Germany | 12,000 |

== See also ==
- List of football stadiums in China
- List of stadiums in China
- Lists of stadiums
