= Lin Mei-chun =

Chinese football player from Taiwan

Personal information
- Date of birth: 11 January 1974 (age 52)
- Position: Forward

Senior career*
Years	Team	Apps	(Gls)
- Ming Chuan University

International career^{‡}
- Chinese Taipei
- * Club domestic league appearances and goals ‡ National team caps and goals as of 16 November 1991 (before the 1991 FIFA Women's World Cup)

Lin Mei-chun (Chinese: 林美君, born 11 January 1974) is a Taiwanese footballer who played as a forward for the Chinese Taipei women's national football team. She was part of the team at the 1991 FIFA Women's World Cup. On club level she played for Ming Chuan University in Taiwan.
