= Petra Damm =

German women's international footballer

Personal information
- Date of birth: 20 March 1961 (age 65)
- Position: Midfielder

Senior career*
Years	Team	Apps	(Gls)
- VfR Eintracht Wolfsburg

International career^{‡}
	Germany	43	
- * Club domestic league appearances and goals ‡ National team caps and goals as of 16 November 1991 (before the 1991 FIFA Women's World Cup)

Petra Damm (born 20 March 1961) is a German women's international footballer who plays as a midfielder. She is a member of the Germany women's national football team. She was part of the team at the 1991 FIFA Women's World Cup. On club level she plays for VfR Eintracht Wolfsburg in Germany.
