= Ngozi Eucharia Uche =

Nigerian football coach

Uche Eucharia Ngozi
Personal information
- Full name: Uche Eucharia Ngozi
- Date of birth: 18 June 1973 (age 53)
- Place of birth: Mbaise, Nigeria
- Position: Forward

Youth career
- Edo Queens

Senior career*
Years	Team	Apps	(Gls)
1988-1990	Rivers Angels		
1990-2000	Delta Queens		

International career
1991-2000	Nigeria		

Managerial career
- 2009 - 2011: Nigeria (women's)
- * Club domestic league appearances and goals

Uche Eucharia Ngozi (born 18 June 1973 in Mbaise, Imo State, Nigeria) is a former Nigerian football player and a former head coach of the Nigeria women's national football team. She has served as both the first female assistant coach and also the first female head coach of Nigeria's national women's team. She is currently a FIFA and Confederation of African Football instructor. Uche grew up in Owerri, Nigeria.

== Early life ==
The first of five children, she was brought up in a middle-class environment. She attended the Egbu Girls Secondary School Owerri, before heading to Delta State University. While in secondary school, Uche began playing football. In her playing days, she played for Bendel Striking Queens, present-day Edo Queens, Rivers Angels, and Ufuoma Babes, present-day Delta Queens. She later played for the Nigerian National team Super Falcons. In her playing days, she became the first African female to be named Top Scorer in an international match, as well as the first Nigerian female to score an international hat-trick, Nigeria vs Ghana 1999. She went on and became their first female coach. In 2010, she became the first woman coach to win an African Women's Championship title. She was sacked in October 2011 after Nigeria failed to qualify for the 2012 Summer Olympics.

== Controversy ==
Uche was cautioned by FIFA for remarks she made during the 2011 FIFA Women's World Cup, in which she called homosexuality a "concerning issue" that affected the seriousness of her players.

== Honours ==
Nigeria

Coach

- African Women's Championship Winner (2): 2010, 2000 (as Assistant Coach)

Club Coach

- Nigeria Women Football League Winner (1): 2003
- Nigeria Women's Cup Winner (2): 2004, 2006
