= Susanne Brück =

German footballer

Personal information
- Date of birth: 30 November 1972 (age 53)
- Position: Midfielder

Senior career*
Years	Team	Apps	(Gls)
- VfR 09 Saarbrücken

International career
1990–1992	Germany	3	(0)
- * Club domestic league appearances and goals

Susanne Brück (née Messner, born 30 November 1972) is a German football midfielder who played for VfR 09 Saarbrücken. She also played three international matches for Germany. She was part of the team at the UEFA Women's Euro 1991 and UEFA Women's Euro 1993.
