= Ngozi Ezeocha =

Nigerian footballer

Personal information
- Date of birth: 12 October 1973 (age 53)
- Position: Defender

International career^{‡}
Years	Team	Apps	(Gls)
	Nigeria	4	(0)
- ‡ National team caps and goals as of 5 June 1995 (before the 1995 FIFA Women's World Cup)

Ngozi Ezeocha // (born 12 October 1973) is a former footballer who played as a defender for the Nigeria women's national football team. She competed with the team at the 1991 FIFA Women's World Cup and 1995 FIFA Women's World Cup.

== Honours ==
Individual

- IFFHS All-time Africa Women's Dream Team: 2021
