= Ann Mukoro =

Nigerian footballer

Personal information
- Date of birth: 27 May 1975 (age 51)
- Position: Midfielder

International career^{‡}
| Years | Team | Apps | (Gls) |
- Nigeria
- ‡ National team caps and goals as of 5 June 1995 (before the 1995 FIFA Women's World Cup)

Ann Mukoro (born 27 May 1975) is a former footballer who played as a midfielder for the Nigeria women's national football team. She was part of the team at the inaugural 1991 FIFA Women's World Cup and the 1995 FIFA Women's World Cup.
