= Frauke Kuhlmann =

German footballer

Personal information
- Date of birth: 27 September 1966 (age 60)
- Place of birth: Bad Segeberg, West Germany
- Position: Defender

Senior career*
| Years | Team | Apps | (Gls) |
- Schmalfelder SV

International career^{‡}
| | Germany | 36 | |
- * Club domestic league appearances and goals ‡ National team caps and goals as of 16 November 1991 (before the 1991 FIFA Women's World Cup)

Frauke Kuhlmann (born 27 September 1966 in Bad Segeberg) is a German women's international footballer who plays as a defender. She is a member of the Germany women's national football team. She was part of the team at the 1991 FIFA Women's World Cup. On club level she plays for Schmalfelder SV in Germany.
