= Jiangmen Stadium =

Sports venue in Jiangmen, China

Coordinates: 22°35′19″N 113°05′02″E

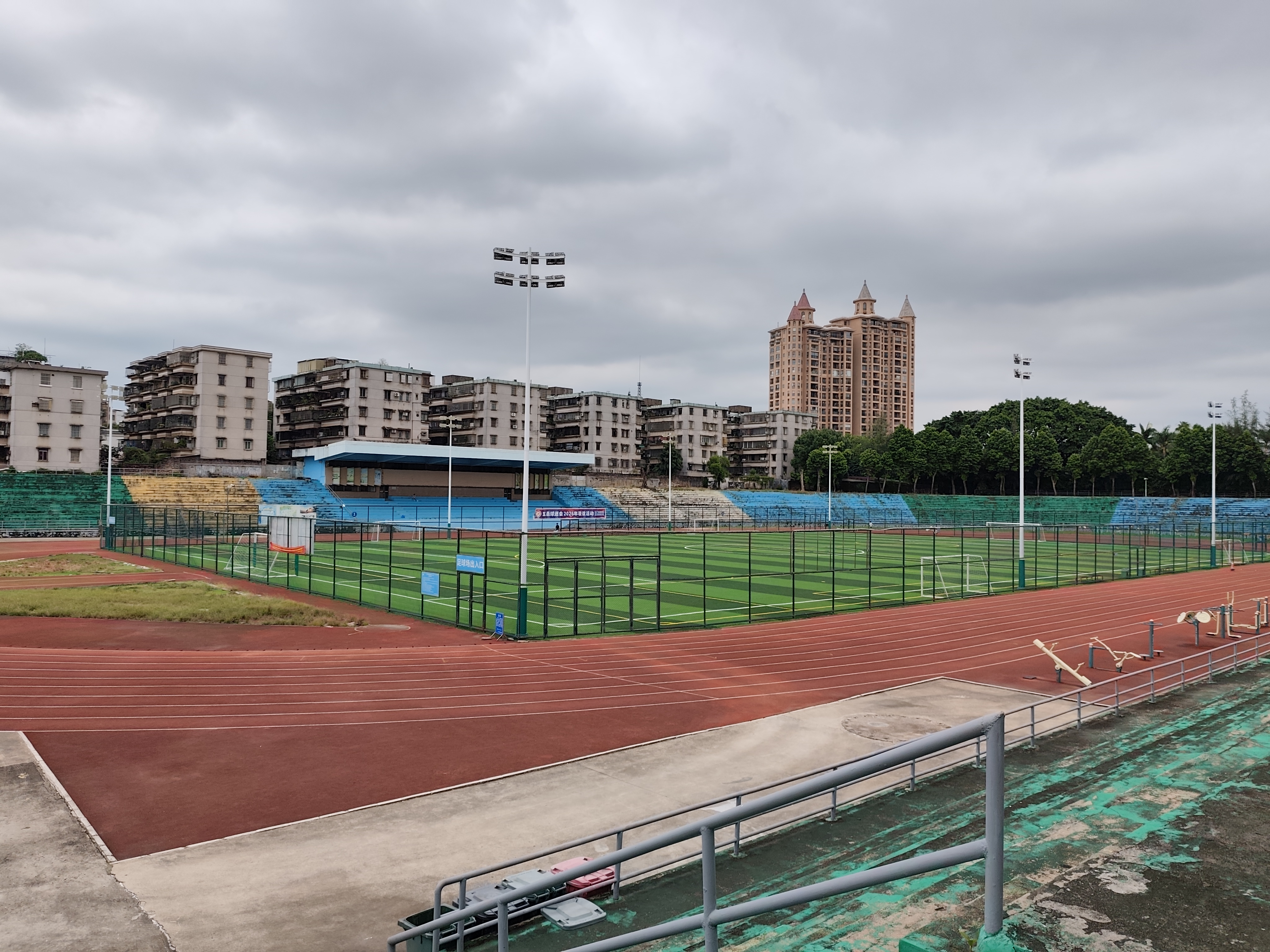
Inside Jiangmen Stadium

Jiangmen Stadium (Chinese: 江门体育场) is a multi-use stadium in Jiangmen, China. It is currently used mostly for football matches and was one of the six stadiums used for the 1991 FIFA Women's World Cup. The stadium has a capacity of 13,000 people.

== 1991 FIFA Women's World Cup matches ==
Date	Competition	Team	Res	Team	Crowd
17 November 1991	Group C	Germany	4–0	Nigeria	14,000
17 November 1991	Group C	Chinese Taipei	0–5	Italy	11,000
21 November 1991	Group C	Chinese Taipei	2–0	Nigeria	14,000
24 November 1991	Quarter-finals	Norway	3–2 (a.e.t)	Italy	13,000
