= Gudrun Gottschlich =

German footballer

Personal information
- Date of birth: 23 May 1970 (age 56)
- Position: Forward

Senior career*
Years	Team	Apps	(Gls)
- KBC Duisburg

International career^{‡}
	Germany	16	
- * Club domestic league appearances and goals ‡ National team caps and goals as of 16 November 1991 (before the 1991 FIFA Women's World Cup)

Gudrun Gottschlich (born 23 May 1970) is a German women's international footballer who plays as a forward. She is a member of the Germany women's national football team. She was part of the team at the 1991 FIFA Women's World Cup. On club level she plays for KBC Duisburg in Germany.
