= Chou Tai-ying =

Chinese football player and coach from Taiwan

Personal information
- Full name: Chou Tai-ying (周台英)
- Date of birth: 16 August 1963 (age 63)
- Place of birth: Republic of China (Taiwan)
- Positions: Striker; midfielder

Senior career*
Years	Team	Apps	(Gls)
1987–1989	SV Bergisch Gladbach 09		
1989–1993	Suzuyo Shimizu F.C. Ladies		

International career
1977–1994	Chinese Taipei		

Managerial career
- 2005–: National Taiwan Normal University
- 2006: Chinese Taipei
- * Club domestic league appearances and goals

Chou Tai-ying (Chinese: 周台英; born 16 August 1963) is a Taiwanese female association football coach and former player. She is considered the most successful Taiwanese footballer so far.

== Domestic career ==
She was Chinese Taipei's key player in the 1980s and early 1990s, winning three AFC Women's Championships (1977, 1979, 1981) and two OFC Women's Championships (1986, 1989).

== Overseas career ==
Chou was also one of the few Taiwanese players who have played for foreign professional clubs. In 1987, she joined the German football club SV Bergisch Gladbach 09 and won two championships. She was chosen by the Japanese team Suzuyo Shimizu F.C. Ladies for their inaugural team in the newly formed Japanese L. League in 1989, to add power to the team’s offence, which had been lacking. The Shimizu F.C. Ladies won the first league season title and Chou was the stand out player, scoring 12 goals, earning the Golden Boot and a spot as member of Best XI.

== International career ==
Chou was the captain of the Chinese Taipei women's national football team at the inaugural 1991 FIFA Women's World Cup. The team reached the quarter-finals before being beaten 7–0 by the eventual winners the United States.

She retired from her playing career following the 1994 Asian Games.

== Coaching career ==
In 2005, Chou took over as the head coach of the Chinese Taipei women's national football team.

NTNU Women's Football Team Blood Sample Incident On November 28, 2024, students from the National Taiwan Normal University (NTNU) women's football team, through then-Democratic Progressive Party (DPP) legislator Chen Pei-yu, revealed that they were coerced by their coach and two other professors into participating in a research project that violated the Human Subjects Research Act. The project reportedly required athletes to provide blood samples three times a day for 14 consecutive days, with team members having their blood drawn twice daily by non-professional medical personnel. Failure to comply with the blood sampling experiments could lead to penalties such as failing required courses, forced removal from the varsity team, or even delayed graduation. Coach Chou Tai-ying also allegedly collected research subsidies meant for test subjects and used them as team funds.

After the news broke, Chou Tai-ying reportedly summoned the students that same evening and threatened them, saying: "Where did I wrong you? Either call him to save you, or we'll just stay here today, because I haven't slept a wink either." The university's initial response, stating that they "had not yet launched a formal investigation" and that "not all claims were entirely true," drew criticism from the public, who questioned the official delay in handling the matter and the lack of reflection and apology.

In early December 2024, the university relieved Coach Chou Tai-ying of her administrative and coaching duties for two years and explicitly prohibited her from leading any athletic teams thereafter.

On April 10, 2025, the NTNU Bullying Investigation Committee determined that Chou Tai-ying had engaged in campus bullying and recommended her dismissal and a two-year prohibition from being rehired as a teacher. This recommendation was referred to the three-tier Teacher Review Committee for deliberation. However, the Teacher Review Committee did not adopt the recommendation, instead imposing only administrative penalties such as a freeze on salary increases.

In May 2025, after the National College Cup concluded, Chou Tai-ying merely had a departmental staff member read her handwritten apology letter to the students.

On July 14, 2025, National Taiwan Normal University issued a statement on its Facebook page, indicating that the school had completed its investigation into the alleged violations of the Human Subjects Research Act by the football team's instructors. The university issued six points: participant fees had been disbursed to the students' personal accounts, blood samples had been destroyed, the coach had been relieved of her administrative and coaching duties in early December of the previous year, and a photograph of Chou Tai-ying's handwritten apology letter was also released. However, the statement was later deleted. On July 16, the Taipei District Prosecutors Office recognized that Chou was suspected of offenses such as coercion and embezzlement, listing Chou as a defendant in a "he-zi case" (a preliminary investigation case).

== Honours ==
With Chinese Taipei women's national football team

- AFC Women's Championship: 1977, 1979, 1981
- AFC Women's Championship MVP: 1979
- OFC Women's Championship: 1986, 1989

With Shimizu F.C. Ladies

- L. League: 1989
- L. League top scorer: 1989
