= Federica D'Astolfo =

Italian footballer

Personal information
- Full name: Federica D'Astolfo
- Date of birth: 27 October 1966 (age 60)
- Place of birth: Rome, Italy
- Height: 5 ft 7 in (1.70 m)
- Position: Midfielder

Youth career
- Bravetta Aurelio

Senior career*
Years	Team	Apps	(Gls)
1978–1986	Urbe Tevere		
1986–1991	Lazio		
1991–1992	Sassari Torres		
1992–1993	ACF Milan		
1993–1994	Agliana		
1994–1996	Fiammamonza		
1996–1998	Modena		
1998–1999	Pisa		
1999–2003	Foroni Verona		
2003–2005	Atletico Oristano		
2005–2006	Reggiana		

International career
1988–2001	Italy	84	(11)

Managerial career
- 2012–2016: Reggiana
- 2016–2018: Sassuolo
Medal record
Italy
UEFA Women's Championship
Silver medal – second place	Italy 1993
- * Club domestic league appearances and goals

Federica D'Astolfo (born 27 October 1966) is an Italian football coach and former midfielder. She played for Italy at the 1991 and 1999 editions of the FIFA Women's World Cup. Active at club level from 1978 to 2006, she won five women's Serie A winner's medals and one Coppa Italia winner's medal.

== International career ==
D'Astolfo won her first cap for the Italy women's national football team on 2 April 1988, starting a 0–0 1989 European Competition for Women's Football qualifying draw with West Germany in Andria.

At the 1991 FIFA Women's World Cup, D'Astolfo was ever-present as Italy reached the quarter-final and lost 3–2 to Norway after extra time. At UEFA Women's Euro 1993 hosts Italy reached the final and suffered another defeat by Norway, 1–0 this time.

== Honours ==
=== Club ===
Lazio

- Serie A (2): 1986–87, 1987–88

Modena

- Serie A (2): 1996–97, 1997–98
- Italian Women's Super Cup (1): 1997

Foroni Verona

- Serie A (1): 2002–03
- Coppa Italia (1): 2001–02
- Italian Women's Super Cup (1): 2002

=== International ===
Italy

- UEFA Women's Championship Runner-up: 1993
