= Sergio Guenza =

Italian football manager (1933–2020)

Personal information
- Date of birth: 9 January 1933
- Place of birth: Rome, Italy
- Date of death: 6 April 2020 (aged 87)
- Place of death: Rome
- Position: Midfielder

Youth career
- 1947–1957: Lazio

Senior career*
Years	Team	Apps	(Gls)
1952–1953	→ L'Aquila (loan)		
1956–1957	→ Tivoli (loan)		
1957–1958	Foligno		
1962–1964	Vis Sezze		

Managerial career
- 1971–1977: Lazio (youth)
- 1977–1980: Lazio Women
- 1979–1981: Italy Women
- 1981–1982: Lazio (U20)
- 1982–1987: Lazio (B)
- 1982–1988: Lazio Women
- 1987–1988: Angizia Luco
- 1989–1993: Italy Women
- 1995–1997: Italy Women
- 1998–1999: Lazio Women
- 2004–2005: Lazio Women
- * Club domestic league appearances and goals

Sergio Guenza (9 January 1933 – 6 April 2020) was an Italian football manager.

== Career ==
Guenza was the head coach of the Italy women's national team in 1979–1981, 1989–1993 and 1995–1997, including at the 1991 FIFA Women's World Cup.

== Personal life ==
Guenza died on 6 April 2020 at the age of 87.
