= Gero Bisanz =

German football coach (1935–2014)

Personal information
- Date of birth: 3 November 1935
- Place of birth: Konojady, Poland
- Date of death: 17 October 2014 (aged 78)
- Position: Midfielder

Senior career*
Years	Team	Apps	(Gls)
1959–1960	1. FC Köln		
1960–1969	Viktoria Köln		

Managerial career
- 1971–1973: Bayer Leverkusen
- 1974–1975: TuS Lindlar
- 1975–1980: 1. FC Köln (amateurs)
- 1981–1982: Germany B
- 1982–1996: Germany (women)
- * Club domestic league appearances and goals

Gero Bisanz (3 November 1935 – 17 October 2014) was a German football player and coach.

== Career ==
Bisanz played for 1. FC Köln and Viktoria Köln.

From 1982 to 1996, he was the coach of the Germany women's national team, in that time winning the UEFA Women's Championship three times, in 1989, 1991 and 1995. He also was leading director of the German Football Association's coaches training facilities from 1971 to 2000, then being followed by Erich Rutemöller. He also coached 1. FC Köln (amateurs), Bayer Leverkusen, TuS Lindlar and Germany B.
