= Antonella Carta =

Italian footballer (born 1967)

Personal information
- Date of birth: 1 March 1967 (age 59)
- Place of birth: Nuoro, Italy
- Position: Midfielder

International career^{‡}
| Years | Team | Apps | (Gls) |
- Italy
- ‡ National team caps and goals as of 19 June 1999 (before the 1999 FIFA Women's World Cup)

Antonella Carta (born 1 March 1967) is an Italian footballer who played as a midfielder for the Italy women's national football team. She was part of the team at the UEFA Women's Euro 1997 and 1999 FIFA Women's World Cup where she was the team captain.
