= Bettina Wiegmann =

German footballer (born 1971)

Personal information
- Full name: Bettina Wiegmann
- Date of birth: 7 October 1971 (age 55)
- Place of birth: Euskirchen, West Germany
- Height: 1.70 m (5 ft 7 in)
- Position: Midfielder

Youth career
- 1978–1982: TSV Feytal
- 1982–1984: TuS Mechernich
- 1984–1988: SpVgg Bleibuir-Voissel

Senior career*
| Years | Team | Apps | (Gls) |
| 1988–2001 | 1. FC Köln | | |
| 2001–2002 | Boston Breakers | | |
| 2003 | 1. FC Köln | | |

International career
| 1989–2003 | Germany | 154 | (51) |
Medal record
Women's football
Representing Germany
Olympic Games
| Bronze medal – third place | 2000 Sydney | Team competition |
- * Club domestic league appearances and goals

Bettina Wiegmann (born 7 October 1971) is a German former footballer who played as a midfielder.

Wiegmann scored 51 goals in 154 caps for the Germany national team between 1989 and 2003. In 1997, she was selected German Female Footballer of the Year.

== Career statistics ==
=== International goals ===
Bettina Wiegmann competed in four FIFA Women's World Cup: China 1991, Sweden 1995, USA 1999 and USA 2003; and two Olympics: 1996 Summer Olympic Games, and 2000 Summer Olympic Games; played 30 matches and scored 14 goals. Along with her Germany teams, Wiegmann is a world champion from USA 2003, runner-up from Sweden 1995; and a bronze medalist at the 2000 Summer Olympic Games.

Key (expand for notes on "international goals" and sorting)
| Location | Geographic location of the venue where the competition occurred Sorted by country name first, then by city name |
| Lineup | Start – played entire match on minute (off player) – substituted on at the minute indicated, and player was substituted off at the same time off minute (on player) – substituted off at the minute indicated, and player was substituted on at the same time (c) – captain Sorted by minutes played |
| Goal in match | Goal of total goals by the player in the match Sorted by total goals followed by goal number |
| # | NumberOfGoals.goalNumber scored by the player in the match (alternate notation to Goal in match) |
| Min | The minute in the match the goal was scored. For list that include caps, blank indicates played in the match but did not score a goal. |
| Assist/pass | The ball was passed by the player, which assisted in scoring the goal. This column depends on the availability and source of this information. |
| penalty or pk | Goal scored on penalty-kick which was awarded due to foul by opponent. (Goals scored in penalty-shoot-out, at the end of a tied match after extra-time, are not included.) |
| Score | The match score after the goal was scored. Sorted by goal difference, then by goal scored by the player's team |
| Result | The final score. Sorted by goal difference in the match, then by goal difference in penalty-shoot-out if it is taken, followed by goal scored by the player's team in the match, then by goal scored in the penalty-shoot-out. For matches with identical final scores, match ending in extra-time without penalty-shoot-out is a tougher match, therefore precede matches that ended in regulation |
| aet | The score at the end of extra-time; the match was tied at the end of 90' regulation |
| pso | Penalty-shoot-out score shown in parentheses; the match was tied at the end of extra-time |
| | Green background color – exhibition or closed door international friendly match |
| | Yellow background color – match at an invitational tournament |
| | Red background color – Olympic women's football qualification match |
| | Light-blue background color – FIFA women's world cup qualification match |
| | Orange background color – Continental Games or regional tournament |
| | Pink background color – Olympic women's football tournament |
| | Blue background color – FIFA women's world cup final tournament |
NOTE on background colors: Continental Games or regional tournament are sometimes also qualifier for World Cup or Olympics; information depends on the source such as the player's federation. NOTE: some keys may not apply for a particular football player

| No. | Date | Venue | Opponent | Score | Result | Competition |
|---|---|---|---|---|---|---|
| 1. | 14 October 1989 | Sopron, Hungary | Hungary | 4–0 | 4–0 | UEFA Women's Euro 1991 qualifying |
| 2. | 19 November 1991 | Zhongshan, China | Chinese Taipei | 1–0 | 3–0 | 1991 FIFA Women's World Cup |
| 3. | 24 November 1991 | Zhongshan, China | Denmark | 1–0 | 2–1 (a.e.t.) | 1991 FIFA Women's World Cup |
| 4. | 27 November 1991 | Guangzhou, China | United States | 2–4 | 2–5 | 1991 FIFA Women's World Cup |
| 5. | 31 March 1994 | Bielefeld, Germany | Wales | 2–0 | 12–0 | UEFA Women's Euro 1995 qualifying |
| 6. | 31 March 1994 | Bielefeld, Germany | Wales | 4–0 | 12–0 | UEFA Women's Euro 1995 qualifying |
| 7. | 31 March 1994 | Bielefeld, Germany | Wales | 12–0 | 12–0 | UEFA Women's Euro 1995 qualifying |
| 8. | 5 May 1994 | Swansea, Wales | Wales | 11–0 | 12–0 | UEFA Women's Euro 1995 qualifying |
| 9. | 25 September 1994 | Weingarten, Germany | Switzerland | 4–0 | 11–0 | UEFA Women's Euro 1995 qualifying |
| 10. | 11 December 1994 | Watford, England | England | 4–1 | 4–1 | UEFA Women's Euro 1995 |
| 11. | 26 March 1995 | Kaiserslautern, Germany | Sweden | 3–1 | 3–2 | UEFA Women's Euro 1995 |
| 12. | 7 June 1995 | Helsingborg, Sweden | Sweden | 1–0 | 2–3 | 1995 FIFA Women's World Cup |
| 13. | 9 June 1995 | Karlstad, Sweden | Brazil | 3–1 | 6–1 | 1995 FIFA Women's World Cup |
| 14. | 15 June 1995 | Helsingborg, Sweden | China | 1–0 | 1–0 | 1995 FIFA Women's World Cup |
| 15. | 20 September 1995 | Tampere, Finland | Finland | 1–0 | 3–0 | UEFA Women's Euro 1997 qualifying |
| 16. | 20 September 1995 | Tampere, Finland | Finland | 3–0 | 3–0 | UEFA Women's Euro 1997 qualifying |
| 17. | 11 April 1996 | Unterhaching, Germany | Slovakia | 1–0 | 2–0 | UEFA Women's Euro 1997 qualifying |
| 18. | 21 July 1996 | Birmingham, United States | Japan | 1–0 | 3–2 | 1996 Summer Olympics |
| 19. | 23 July 1996 | Washington D.C., United States | Norway | 1–1 | 2–3 | 1996 Summer Olympics |
| 20. | 9 July 1997 | Karlstad, Sweden | Sweden | 1–0 | 1–0 | UEFA Women's Euro 1997 |
| 21. | 20 June 1999 | Pasadena, United States | Italy | 1–1 | 1–1 | 1999 FIFA Women's World Cup |
| 22. | 27 June 1999 | Landover, United States | Brazil | 2–2 | 3–3 | 1999 FIFA Women's World Cup |
| 23. | 1 July 1999 | Landover, United States | United States | 2–1 | 2–3 | 1999 FIFA Women's World Cup |
| 24. | 2 September 1999 | Plauen, Germany | Russia | 1–0 | 3–1 | Friendly |
| 25. | 14 October 1999 | Oldenburg, Germany | Iceland | 2–0 | 5–0 | UEFA Women's Euro 2001 qualifying |
| 26. | 14 October 1999 | Oldenburg, Germany | Iceland | 4–0 | 5–0 | UEFA Women's Euro 2001 qualifying |
| 27. | 11 November 1999 | Isernia, Italy | Italy | 4–4 | 4–4 | UEFA Women's Euro 2001 qualifying |
| 28. | 23 September 2000 | Canberra, Australia | Australia | 2–0 | 3–0 | 2000 Summer Olympics |
| 29. | 27 June 2001 | Erfurt, Germany | Russia | 1–0 | 5–0 | UEFA Women's Euro 2001 |
| 30. | 30 June 2001 | Jena, Germany | England | 2–0 | 3–0 | UEFA Women's Euro 2001 |
| 31. | 5 March 2002 | Olhão, Portugal | Finland | 2–0 | 2–0 | 2002 Algarve Cup |
| 32. | 18 April 2002 | Aschaffenburg, Germany | Netherlands | 1–0 | 6–0 | 2003 FIFA Women's World Cup qualification |
| 33. | 18 April 2002 | Aschaffenburg, Germany | Netherlands | 2–0 | 6–0 | 2003 FIFA Women's World Cup qualification |
| 34. | 18 April 2002 | Aschaffenburg, Germany | Netherlands | 6–0 | 6–0 | 2003 FIFA Women's World Cup qualification |
| 35. | 20 September 2003 | Columbus, United States | Canada | 1–1 | 4–1 | 2003 FIFA Women's World Cup |
| 36. | 27 September 2003 | Washington D.C., United States | Argentina | 2–0 | 6–1 | 2003 FIFA Women's World Cup |

== Honours ==
Germany

- FIFA Women's World Cup: 2003
- Football at the Summer Olympics: bronze medal 2000
- UEFA Women's Championship: 1991, 1995, 1997, 2001
