= Feriana Ferraguzzi =

Italian footballer (born 1959)

Fery Ferraguzzi
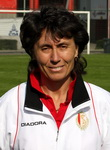

Personal information
- Full name: Feriana Ferraguzzi
- Date of birth: 20 February 1959 (age 67)
- Place of birth: San Martino dei Colli, Perugia, Italy
- Position: Midfielder

Senior career*
Years	Team	Apps	(Gls)
1975–1978	Perugia		
1979–1980	Lazio		
1980–1999	Standard Fémina de Liège		

International career
1975–1993	Italy	73	(8)

Managerial career
- 2003–2004: Standard Fémina de Liège
- 2012–: Belgium U19 (assistant)
- * Club domestic league appearances and goals

Feriana "Fery" Ferraguzzi (born 20 February 1959) is an Italian football coach and former midfielder, who is currently the technical director of BeNe League club Standard Fémina de Liège.

A box-to-box midfielder, Ferraguzzi won two Serie A titles with SS Lazio in 1979 and 1980 before accepting a transfer offer from Standard Fémina de Liège of 2,000,000 lire plus accommodation.

An administrative error by Lazio meant that Ferraguzzi moved to Standard Fémina with no transfer fee. Lazio complained to FIFA and got her banned from the national team for two years.

Overall, Ferraguzzi was a member of the Italy national team from 1975 until 1993, and scored Italy's first official World Cup goal in 1991. She retired from international football aged 34, after playing in Italy's 1–0 UEFA Women's Euro 1993 final defeat to Norway, and being named Player of the Tournament.
