= ASD Reggiana Calcio Femminile =

Italian football club

Reggiana Calcio Femminile
- Full name: Associazione Sportiva Dilettantistica Reggiana Calcio Femminile
- Founded: 1976
- Dissolved: 2016 (became Sassuolo Femminile)
- Ground: Mirabello, Reggio Emilia, Italy
- Website: http://www.acreggianafemminile.it/
Home colours

Associazione Sportiva Dilettantistica Reggiana Calcio Femminile, known as Reggiana Calcio Femminile or Reggiana for short, was an Italian women's football club from Reggio Emilia, but under licensed to plays as Sassuolo Calcio Femminile for sponsorship reason, since 2016.

The club was sponsored by Mapei, the parent company of the professional male football club U.S. Sassuolo Calcio, changing the club name and color. However, as Mapei also owned Mapei Stadium – Città del Tricolore, the club was not relocated to Sassuolo.

== History ==
Originally established in 1976 as A.C. Santa Croce, it adopted its current name in 1981, and five years later it was promoted to the top tier. Reggiana lived its golden era in subsequent years, winning three national championships and two national cups between 1990 and 1993. However, Reggiana was relegated due to financial strain following this last season. Ten years later the team returned to Serie A. In 2010 Reggiana won its third national cup, but the following year it was again relegated to fourth-tier Serie C. Due to the persistent difficulty in founding funds to guarantee the club survival every season, in 2016 the owners made a deal with U.S. Sassuolo Calcio, which made an offer to the property in order to fulfill a law imposing a women's team to Serie A and Serie B teams starting from the 2017-18 football season. The club remains known as ASD Reggiana Calcio Femminile for federal bureaucracy, but becomes A.S.D. Sassuolo Calcio Femminile, changing the colours from maroon to blue, licensing the team with its giuridical name and its main sponsor Mapei. The deal included also the foundation of a reserve team, a Serie D team and an Under 12 team.

== Titles ==
- Serie A (3)
  - 1990, 1991, 1993
- Coppa Italia (3)
  - 1992, 1993, 2010
