= 1991 FIFA Women's World Cup =

1st FIFA World Championship for Women's Football for the M&M's Cup
- Official logo

Tournament details
- Host country: China
- Dates: 16–30 November
- Teams: 12 (from 6 confederations)
- Venues: 6 (in 4 host cities)

Final positions
- Champions: United States (1st title)
- Runners-up: Norway
- Third place: Sweden
- Fourth place: Germany

Tournament statistics
- Matches played: 26
- Goals scored: 99 (3.81 per match)
- Attendance: 510,000 (19,615 per match)
- Top scorer: (United States) Michelle Akers-Stahl (10 goals)
- Best player: (United States) Carin Jennings
- Fair play award: Germany

The 1991 FIFA Women's World Cup was the first FIFA Women's World Cup, the world championship for women's national football teams. It took place in Guangdong, China from 16 to 30 November 1991. FIFA, football's international governing body, selected China as host nation as Guangdong had hosted a prototype world championship three years earlier, the 1988 FIFA Women's Invitation Tournament. Matches were played in the provincial capital, Guangzhou, as well as in Foshan, Jiangmen and Zhongshan. The competition was sponsored by Mars, Incorporated, maker of M&M's candy. With FIFA still reluctant to bestow their "World Cup" brand, the tournament was officially known as the 1st FIFA World Championship for Women's Football for the M&M's Cup.

It was won by the United States, whose captain April Heinrichs formed a forward line dubbed the "Triple-Edged Sword" with Carin Jennings and Michelle Akers. Jennings was named player of the tournament while Akers's ten goals won the Golden Boot. The United States defeated Norway 2–1 in the final in front of a crowd of 63,000 people at Guangzhou's Tianhe Stadium. Total attendance for the tournament was 510,000, an average per match of 19,615. In the opening match at the same stadium, Norway was defeated 4–0 by hosts China. Chinese defender Ma Li scored the first goal in Women's World Cup history, while goalkeeper Zhong Honglian, also of China, posted the first official clean sheet in the tournament.

The 12 qualified teams were divided into three groups of four (A to C). The top two teams and the two best third-place finishers from the three groups advanced to the knockout round of eight teams. For only this first edition of the Women's World Cup, all matches lasted only 80 minutes, instead of the typical 90, and two points were awarded for a win (both of which would change in 1995).

== Venues ==
Guangzhou
Guangdong Provincial Stadium	Tianhe Stadium	Ying Tung Stadium
Capacity: 25,000	Capacity: 63,000	Capacity: 15,000
Map of Guangdong with 1991 FIFA Women's World Cup venues marked.
Foshan	Jiangmen	Zhongshan
New Plaza Stadium	Jiangmen Stadium	Zhongshan Stadium
Capacity: 14,000	Capacity: 13,000	Capacity: 12,000

== Participating teams and officials ==
=== Qualification ===
The 1991 Women's World Cup had twelve participating teams compete in the final tournament. Each of the six FIFA confederations had at least one representative.

- Africa (CAF)
  - Nigeria
- Asia (AFC)
  - China (hosts)
  - Japan
  - Chinese Taipei
- South America (CONMEBOL)
  - Brazil
- Oceania (OFC)
  - New Zealand
- Europe (UEFA)
  - Denmark
  - Germany
  - Italy
  - Norway
  - Sweden
- North America, Central America & Caribbean (CONCACAF)
  - United States

== Squads ==
For a list of the squads that contended for the final tournament, see 1991 FIFA Women's World Cup squads.

== Match officials ==
For the first time in FIFA competition, six female officials were included. All functioned as lineswomen, except for Cláudia Vasconcelos who took charge of the third place play-off; becoming the first woman to referee a match sanctioned by FIFA.

Confederation	Referee	Appointments
Male officials
AFC	Dai Yuguang (China PR)	4 matches as linesman
AFC	Li Haiseng (China PR)	2 matches as linesman
AFC	Lu Jun (China PR)	2 matches as referee, 1 match as linesman
AFC	Shyam Krishna Shrestha (Nepal)	2 matches as referee, 1 match as linesman
AFC	Xuezhi Wang (China PR)	3 matches as linesman
AFC	Yu Jingyin (China PR)	4 matches as linesman
CAF	Fethi Boucetta (Tunisia)	2 matches as referee, 2 matches as linesman
CAF	Omer Yengo (Congo)	2 matches as referee, 1 match as linesman
CONCACAF	Rafael Rodríguez Medina (El Salvador)	3 matches as referee, 2 matches as linesman
CONMEBOL	Salvador Imperatore (Chile)	3 matches as referee
CONMEBOL	John Toro Rendón (Colombia)	3 matches as referee, 1 match as linesman
UEFA	Jim McCluskey (Scotland)	3 matches as referee, 2 matches as linesman
UEFA	Vassilios Nikakis (Greece)	2 matches as referee, 1 match as linesman
UEFA	Vadim Zhuk (Soviet Union)	3 matches as referee, 1 match as linesman
Female officials
AFC	Zuo Xiudi (China PR)	5 matches as lineswoman
CONCACAF	María Herrera García (Mexico)	3 matches as lineswoman
CONMEBOL	Cláudia Vasconcelos (Brazil)	1 match as referee, 3 matches as lineswoman
OFC	Linda May Black (New Zealand)	5 matches as lineswoman
UEFA	Gertrud Regus (Germany)	6 matches as lineswoman
UEFA	Ingrid Jonsson (Sweden)	5 matches as lineswoman

== Tournament review ==
FIFA's technical report demonstrates that, after the tournament, players and officials were undecided whether to persist with 80-minute matches, or to change to 90 minutes in line with men's football. Opinion was also divided about the suitability of using a size five football. Some teams reported difficulty in sourcing good quality equipment in the correct size.

The tournament was considered a major success in the quality of play and attendances at the games. FIFA president João Havelange wrote that:

"As president of FIFA it was a special pleasure for me to watch these young ladies playing with such flair and such elegance, and according to the reports of the many media representatives present, making the game truly into a celebration ... women's football is now well and truly established."

The perceived success of the tournament was a significant factor in the subsequent inclusion of women's football in the 1996 Summer Olympics. Sue Lopez reported that although attendances were very high, many tickets were complimentary. The "novelty factor" of women from foreign lands playing football also encouraged local people to attend.

== Draw ==
The draw for the group stage was held on 14 September 1991 at the Tianhe Stadium in Guangzhou, China. The draw was part of a televised two-hour live show, featuring songs in both Chinese and English from the female singers Zhang Qiang (Beijing), Lin Ping (Guangzhou), Jenny Tseng (Hong Kong) and Irene Yeh (Taiwan).

== Group stage ==
Tie-breaking criteria for group play
The ranking of teams in the group stage was determined as follows:
1. Points obtained in all group matches (two points for a win, one for a draw, none for a defeat);
2. Goal difference in all group matches;
3. Number of goals scored in all group matches;
4. Points obtained in the matches played between the teams in question;
5. Goal difference in the matches played between the teams in question;
6. Number of goals scored in the matches played between the teams in question;
7. Number of wins in all group matches;
8. Drawing of lots.

=== Group A ===
Pos	Team	Pld	W	D	L	GF	GA	GD	Pts	Qualification
1	China (H)	3	2	1	0	10	3	+7	5	Advance to knockout stage
2	Norway	3	2	0	1	6	5	+1	4	Advance to knockout stage
3	Denmark	3	1	1	1	6	4	+2	3	Advance to knockout stage
4	New Zealand	3	0	0	3	1	11	−10	0	

Source: FIFA
(H) Hosts
16 November 1991
20:45

China	4–0	Norway
Ma Li 22'; Liu Ailing 45', 50'; Sun Qingmei 75'	Report

Tianhe Stadium, Guangzhou
Attendance: 65,000
Referee: Salvador Imperatore (Chile)
17 November 1991
19:45

Denmark	3–0	New Zealand
H. Jensen 15', 40'; Mackensie 42'	Report

Tianhe Stadium, Guangzhou
Attendance: 14,000
Referee: Omer Yengo (Congo)

19 November 1991
15:30

Norway	4–0	New Zealand
McCahill 30' (o.g.); Medalen 32', 38'; Riise 49'	Report

Guangdong Provincial Stadium, Guangzhou
Attendance: 12,000
Referee: Salvador Imperatore (Chile)
19 November 1991
19:45

China	2–2	Denmark
Sun Wen 37'; Wei Haiying 76'	Report	Kolding 24'; Nissen 55'

Guangdong Provincial Stadium, Guangzhou
Attendance: 27,000
Referee: Vassilios Nikakis (Greece)

21 November 1991
19:45

China	4–1	New Zealand
Zhou Yang 20'; Liu Ailing 22', 60'; Wu Weiying 24'	Report	Nye 65'

New Plaza Stadium, Foshan
Attendance: 14,000
Referee: Raja Shrestha Gyanu (Nepal)
21 November 1991
19:45

Norway	2–1	Denmark
Svensson 14' (pen.); Medalen 56'	Report	Thychosen 54' (pen.)

Ying Tung Stadium, Guangzhou
Attendance: 15,500
Referee: Vadim Zhuk (Soviet Union)

=== Group B ===
Pos	Team	Pld	W	D	L	GF	GA	GD	Pts	Qualification
1	United States	3	3	0	0	11	2	+9	6	Advance to knockout stage
2	Sweden	3	2	0	1	12	3	+9	4	Advance to knockout stage
3	Brazil	3	1	0	2	1	7	−6	2	
4	Japan	3	0	0	3	0	12	−12	0	

Source: FIFA
17 November 1991
19:45

Japan	0–1	Brazil
	Report	Elane 4'

New Plaza Stadium, Foshan
Attendance: 14,000
Referee: Lu Jun (China PR)
17 November 1991
19:45

Sweden	2–3	United States
Videkull 65'; I. Johansson 71'	Report	Jennings 40', 49'; Hamm 62'

Ying Tung Stadium, Guangzhou
Attendance: 14,000
Referee: John Toro Rendón (Colombia)

19 November 1991
19:45

Japan	0–8	Sweden
	Report	Videkull 1', 11'; Andelén 15', 60'; Lundgren 25'; Nilsson 27'; Sundhage 34'; Yamaguchi 70' (o.g.)

New Plaza Stadium, Foshan
Attendance: 14,000
Referee: Raja Shrestha Gyanu (Nepal)
19 November 1991
19:45

Brazil	0–5	United States
	Report	Heinrichs 23', 35'; Jennings 38'; Akers-Stahl 39'; Hamm 63'

Ying Tung Stadium, Guangzhou
Attendance: 15,500
Referee: Vadim Zhuk (Soviet Union)

21 November 1991
15:30

Japan	0–3	United States
	Report	Akers-Stahl 20', 37'; Gebauer 39'

New Plaza Stadium, Foshan
Attendance: 14,000
Referee: John Toro Rendón (Colombia)
21 November 1991
15:30

Brazil	0–2	Sweden
	Report	Sundhage 42' (pen.); Hedberg 56'

Ying Tung Stadium, Guangzhou
Attendance: 12,000
Referee: Lu Jun (China PR)

=== Group C ===
Pos	Team	Pld	W	D	L	GF	GA	GD	Pts	Qualification
1	Germany	3	3	0	0	9	0	+9	6	Advance to knockout stage
2	Italy	3	2	0	1	6	2	+4	4	Advance to knockout stage
3	Chinese Taipei	3	1	0	2	2	8	−6	2	Advance to knockout stage
4	Nigeria	3	0	0	3	0	7	−7	0	

Source: FIFA
Rules for classification: Group stage tiebreakers
17 November 1991
15:30

Germany	4–0	Nigeria
Neid 16'; Mohr 32', 34'; Gottschlich 57'	Report

Jiangmen Stadium, Jiangmen
Attendance: 14,000
Referee: Rafael Rodríguez Medina (El Salvador)
17 November 1991
19:45

Chinese Taipei	0–5	Italy
	Report	Ferraguzzi 15'; Marsiletti 29'; Morace 37', 52', 66'

Jiangmen Stadium, Jiangmen
Attendance: 11,000
Referee: Fethi Boucetta (Tunisia)

19 November 1991
15:30

Italy	1–0	Nigeria
Morace 68'	Report

Zhongshan Stadium, Zhongshan
Attendance: 12,000
Referee: Jim McCluskey (Scotland)
19 November 1991
19:45

Chinese Taipei	0–3	Germany
	Report	Wiegmann 10' (pen.); Mohr 21', 50'

Zhongshan Stadium, Zhongshan
Attendance: 10,000
Referee: Fethi Boucetta (Tunisia)

21 November 1991
19:45

Chinese Taipei	2–0	Nigeria
Lin Mei-chun 38'; Chou Tai-ying 55'	Report

Jiangmen Stadium, Jiangmen
Attendance: 14,000
Referee: Rafael Rodríguez Medina (El Salvador)
21 November 1991
19:45

Italy	0–2	Germany
	Report	Mohr 67'; Unsleber 79'

Zhongshan Stadium, Zhongshan
Attendance: 12,000
Referee: Jim McCluskey (Scotland)

=== Ranking of third-placed teams ===
Pos	Grp	Team	Pld	W	D	L	GF	GA	GD	Pts	Qualification
1	A	Denmark	3	1	1	1	6	4	+2	3	Advance to knockout stage
2	C	Chinese Taipei	3	1	0	2	2	8	−6	2	Advance to knockout stage
3	B	Brazil	3	1	0	2	1	7	−6	2	

Source: FIFA
Rules for classification: 1) Points; 2) Goal difference; 3) Goals scored.

== Knockout stage ==
=== Bracket ===
Quarter-finals
24 November – Guangzhou (Tianhe)
China	0
Sweden	1
24 November – Jiangmen
Norway (a.e.t.)	3
Italy	2
24 November – Zhongshan
Denmark	1
Germany (a.e.t.)	2
24 November – Foshan
United States	7
Chinese Taipei	0

Semi-finals
27 November – Guangzhou (Ying Tung)
Sweden	1
Norway	4
27 November – Guangzhou (Provincial)
Germany	2
United States	5

Final
30 November – Guangzhou (Tianhe)
Norway	1
United States	2
Third place play-off
29 November – Guangzhou (Provincial)
Sweden	4
Germany	0

=== Quarter-finals ===
24 November 1991
15:30

Denmark	1–2 (a.e.t.)	Germany
Mackensie 25' (pen.)	Report	Wiegmann 17' (pen.); Mohr 98'

Zhongshan Stadium, Zhongshan
Attendance: 12,000
Referee: Vassilios Nikakis (Greece)

24 November 1991
19:45

China	0–1	Sweden
	Report	Sundhage 3'

Tianhe Stadium, Guangzhou
Attendance: 55,000
Referee: John Toro Rendón (Colombia)

24 November 1991
19:45

Norway	3–2 (a.e.t.)	Italy
Hegstad 22'; Carlsen 67'; Svensson 96' (pen.)	Report	Salmaso 31'; Guarino 80'

Jiangmen Stadium, Jiangmen
Attendance: 13,000
Referee: Rafael Rodríguez Medina (El Salvador)

24 November 1991
19:45

United States	7–0	Chinese Taipei
Akers-Stahl 8', 29', 33', 44' (pen.), 48'; Foudy 38'; Biefeld 79'	Report

New Plaza Stadium, Foshan
Attendance: 12,000
Referee: Omer Yengo (Congo)

=== Semi-finals ===
27 November 1991
15:30

Sweden	1–4	Norway
Videkull 6'	Report	Svensson 39' (pen.); Medalen 41', 77'; Carlsen 67'

Ying Tung Stadium, Guangzhou
Attendance: 16,000
Referee: Jim McCluskey (Scotland)

27 November 1991
19:45

Germany	2–5	United States
Mohr 34'; Wiegmann 63'	Report	Jennings 10', 22', 33'; Heinrichs 54', 75'

Guangdong Provincial Stadium, Guangzhou
Attendance: 15,000
Referee: Salvador Imperatore (Chile)

=== Third place play-off ===
29 November 1991
19:45

Sweden	4–0	Germany
Andelén 7'; Sundhage 11'; Videkull 29'; Nilsson 43'	Report

Guangdong Provincial Stadium, Guangzhou
Attendance: 20,000
Referee: Cláudia Vasconcelos (Brazil)

=== Final ===
30 November 1991
19:45

Norway	1–2	United States
Medalen 29'	Report	Akers-Stahl 20', 78'

Tianhe Stadium, Guangzhou
Attendance: 63,000
Referee: Vadim Zhuk (Soviet Union)

== Awards ==
The following awards were given at the conclusion of the tournament:

Golden Ball	Silver Ball	Bronze Ball
(United States) Carin Jennings	(United States) Michelle Akers	(Norway) Linda Medalen
Golden Shoe	Silver Shoe	Bronze Shoe
(United States) Michelle Akers-Stahl	(Germany) Heidi Mohr	(Norway) Linda Medalen (United States) Carin Jennings
10 goals	7 goals	6 goals
FIFA Fair Play Award
Germany

== Statistics ==
=== Goalscorers ===
There were 99 goals scored in 26 matches, for an average of 3.81 goals per match. Michelle Akers-Stahl of the United States won the Golden Boot award for scoring ten goals.

10 goals

- (United States) Michelle Akers-Stahl

7 goals

- (Germany) Heidi Mohr

6 goals

- (Norway) Linda Medalen
- (United States) Carin Jennings

5 goals

- (Sweden) Lena Videkull

4 goals

- (China) Liu Ailing
- (Italy) Carolina Morace
- (Sweden) Pia Sundhage
- (United States) April Heinrichs

3 goals

- (Germany) Bettina Wiegmann
- (Norway) Tina Svensson
- (Sweden) Anneli Andelén

2 goals

- (Denmark) Helle Jensen
- (Denmark) Susan Mackensie
- (Norway) Agnete Carlsen
- (Sweden) Helen Nilsson
- (United States) Mia Hamm

1 goal

- (Brazil) Elane
- (China) Ma Li
- (China) Sun Qingmei
- (China) Sun Wen
- (China) Wei Haiying
- (China) Wu Weiying
- (China) Zhou Yang
- (Chinese Taipei) Chou Tai-ying
- (Chinese Taipei) Lin Mei-chun
- (Denmark) Lisbet Kolding
- (Denmark) Hanne Nissen
- (Denmark) Annette Thychosen
- (Germany) Gudrun Gottschlich
- (Germany) Silvia Neid
- (Germany) Britta Unsleber
- (Italy) Feriana Ferraguzzi
- (Italy) Rita Guarino
- (Italy) Adele Marsiletti
- (Italy) Raffaella Salmaso
- (New Zealand) Kim Nye
- (Norway) Birthe Hegstad
- (Norway) Hege Riise
- (Sweden) Susanne Hedberg
- (Sweden) Ingrid Johansson
- (Sweden) Malin Lundgren
- (United States) Joy Biefeld
- (United States) Julie Foudy
- (United States) Wendy Gebauer

1 own goal

- (Japan) Sayuri Yamaguchi (against Sweden)
- (New Zealand) Terry McCahill (against Norway)

=== Assists ===
4 assists

- (Germany) Martina Voss
- (Sweden) Helen Johansson

3 assists

- (United States) Carin Jennings

2 assists

- (China) Li Xiufu
- (China) Wu Weiying
- (Denmark) Helle Jensen
- (Germany) Roswitha Bindl
- (Italy) Adele Marsiletti
- (Italy) Carolina Morace
- (Norway) Tone Haugen
- (Norway) Gunn Nyborg
- (Sweden) Helen Nilsson
- (Sweden) Pia Sundhage
- (United States) Julie Foudy
- (United States) April Heinrichs
- (United States) Shannon Higgins

1 assist

- (Brazil) Cenira
- (Chinese Taipei) Shieh Su-jean
- (Denmark) Annie Gam-Pedersen
- (Denmark) Hanne Nissen
- (Denmark) Irene Stelling
- (Germany) Birgitt Austermühl
- (Germany) Gudrun Gottschlich
- (Germany) Beate Wendt
- (Germany) Bettina Wiegmann
- (Italy) Anna Mega
- (New Zealand) Monique van de Elzen
- (Norway) Agnete Carlsen
- (Norway) Margunn Humlestøl
- (Norway) Hege Riise
- (Norway) Heidi Støre
- (Norway) Cathrine Zaborowski
- (Sweden) Anneli Andelén
- (Sweden) Anette Hansson
- (Sweden) Ingrid Johansson
- (United States) Michelle Akers-Stahl
- (United States) Joy Biefeld
- (United States) Linda Hamilton

Source: FIFA Technical Report

=== Tournament ranking ===
Per statistical convention in football, matches decided in extra time are counted as wins and losses, while matches decided by penalty shoot-outs are counted as draws.

Pos	Grp	Team	Pld	W	D	L	GF	GA	GD	Pts	Final result
1	B	United States	6	6	0	0	25	5	+20	12	Champions
2	A	Norway	6	4	0	2	14	10	+4	8	Runners-up
3	B	Sweden	6	4	0	2	18	7	+11	8	Third place
4	C	Germany	6	4	0	2	13	10	+3	8	Fourth place
5	A	China (H)	4	2	1	1	10	4	+6	5	Eliminated in quarter-finals
6	C	Italy	4	2	0	2	8	5	+3	4	Eliminated in quarter-finals
7	A	Denmark	4	1	1	2	7	6	+1	3	Eliminated in quarter-finals
8	C	Chinese Taipei	4	1	0	3	2	15	−13	2	Eliminated in quarter-finals
9	B	Brazil	3	1	0	2	1	7	−6	2	Eliminated in group stage
10	C	Nigeria	3	0	0	3	0	7	−7	0	Eliminated in group stage
11	A	New Zealand	3	0	0	3	1	11	−10	0	Eliminated in group stage
12	B	Japan	3	0	0	3	0	12	−12	0	Eliminated in group stage

Source: FIFA Technical Report
(H) Hosts
