= Bulgaria women's national football team results =

This article lists the results and fixtures for Bulgaria women's national football team.

the Bulgaria women's national football team (Bulgarian: Български женски национален отбор по футбол) is the representative of Bulgaria in international women's association football, It is governed by the Bulgarian Football Union (Bulgarian: Български футболен съюз) and it competes as a member of the Union of European Football Associations.

The national team's first appearance was in the late 1980s when they entered the 1989 European Competition for Women's Football qualifying, they were drawn in Group 4 alongside France, Czechoslovakia, Belgium and Spain. the Lioness played their first game against Spain women's national football team in Sofia, Bulgaria. the match ended with the teams sharing points. in the UEFA Women's Euro 1995 qualifying Bulgaria got its first win against the Lithuanian team with Efrossina Kovatscheva Scoring the winning goal. on the other side in the 2015 FIFA Women's World Cup qualification the lioness of Bulgaria suffered a 14-nil loss against France which is the team's largest loss to date.

As of 13 October 2022, Bulgaria is ranked 92nd at the FIFA Women's World Rankings which is their Lowest ranking to date. with its highest FIFA ranking being 33rd in the 2008 December ranking update.

== Record per opponent ==
Key

Positive balance (more wins than losses)
Neutral balance (as many wins as losses)
Negative balance (more losses than wins)

The following table shows Bulgaria' all-time official international record per opponent:

Opponent	Pld	W	D	L	GF	GA	GD	W%	Confederation
Albania	2	1	0	1	3	2	+1	50.00	UEFA
Armenia	1	1	0	0	4	1	+3	100.00	UEFA
Austria	2	0	0	2	1	10	-9	00.00	UEFA
Azerbaijan	2	1	0	1	3	1	+2	50.00	UEFA
Belgium	4	0	1	3	0	11	-11	00.00	UEFA
Bosnia and Herzegovina	3	1	1	1	3	3	0	33.33	UEFA
Croatia	2	0	0	2	1	9	-8	00.00	UEFA
Cyprus	4	2	1	1	5	4	+1	50.00	UEFA
Czech Republic	4	0	0	4	2	9	-7	00.00	UEFA
Denmark	4	0	1	3	1	19	-18	00.00	UEFA
Estonia	1	1	0	0	5	0	+5	100.00	UEFA
Finland	2	0	0	2	0	12	-12	00.00	UEFA
France	4	0	0	4	0	31	-31	00.00	UEFA
Georgia	2	1	1	0	6	1	+5	50.00	UEFA
Germany	5	0	0	5	2	26	-24	00.00	UEFA
Greece	5	4	0	1	12	3	+9	80.00	UEFA
Hungary	11	3	0	8	6	37	-31	27.27	UEFA
Iceland	2	0	0	2	0	16	-16	00.00	UEFA
Israel	3	0	0	3	0	6	-6	00.00	UEFA
Kazakhstan	4	2	1	1	9	9	0	50.00	UEFA
Latvia	2	1	1	0	5	1	+4	50.00	UEFA
Lithuania	3	1	1	1	4	4	0	33.33	UEFA
Luxembourg	2	2	0	0	8	0	+8	100.00	UEFA
Malta	1	1	0	0	1	0	+1	100.00	UEFA
Moldova	1	1	0	0	2	1	+1	100.00	UEFA
North Korea	2	0	0	2	0	7	-7	00.00	AFC
North Macedonia	4	2	1	1	15	11	+4	50.00	UEFA
Northern Ireland	2	0	0	2	1	5	-4	00.00	UEFA
Norway	2	0	0	2	0	14	-14	00.00	UEFA
Poland	1	0	0	1	0	2	-2	00.00	UEFA
Portugal	2	0	0	2	0	8	-8	00.00	UEFA
Romania	8	1	3	4	5	17	-12	12.50	UEFA
Russia	6	0	2	4	2	11	-9	00.00	UEFA
Scotland	3	0	0	3	1	16	-15	00.00	UEFA
Serbia	6	0	0	6	3	18	-15	00.00	UEFA
Slovenia	1	0	0	1	0	4	-4	00.00	UEFA
Spain	2	0	1	1	1	2	-1	00.00	UEFA
Turkey	8	2	2	4	12	11	+1	25.00	UEFA
Ukraine	5	0	0	5	2	8	-6	00.00	UEFA
United States	1	0	0	1	0	3	-3	00.00	CONCACAF
Wales	1	0	0	1	1	8	-7	00.00	UEFA
Total	130	28	17	85	126	362	-234	21.54	—

== Results ==
Legend

Win Draw Lose Fixture

=== 1987 ===
11 Oct 1987 UEFA Women's Euro 1989 qualifying Group 4	Bulgaria	1–1	Spain	Sofia, Bulgaria
18:00 UTC+3	Lekova 66'	Report	Hernández 56'	Stadium: Vasil Levski National Stadium; Referee: Octavian Streng (Romania)

21 Nov 1987 UEFA Women's Euro 1989 qualifying Group 4	France	5–0	Bulgaria	Lucé, France
--:-- UTC+1	Mismacq 10' (pen.); Puentes 37'; Breton 68'; Musset 70'; Baracat 72'	Report		Stadium: Stade Jean Boudrie; Attendance: 1,800; Referee: José Veiga Trigo (Portugal)

=== 1988 ===
20 Mar 1988 UEFA Women's Euro 1989 qualifying Group 4	Spain	1–0	Bulgaria	Valencia, Spain
--:-- UTC+1				Referee: René Bindels (Luxembourg)

9 Apr 1988 UEFA Women's Euro 1989 qualifying Group 4	Bulgaria	0–0	Belgium	Sofia, Bulgaria
14:00 UTC+3		Report		Stadium: Slavia Stadium; Referee: Dimitrios Naoum (Greece)

24 Apr 1988 UEFA Women's Euro 1989 qualifying Group 4	Bulgaria	0–1	Czechoslovakia	Dupnitsa, Bulgaria
--:-- UTC+3				Referee: Costas Kapsos (Cyprus)

1 Oct 1988 UEFA Women's Euro 1989 qualifying Group 4	Belgium	5–0	Bulgaria	Tienen, Belgium
15:00 UTC+2	Verdonck; Gevers; Cotman; Kinnaer; Van Herle	Report		Stadium: Bergéstadion; Referee: Karl-Josef Assenmacher (West Germany)

23 Oct 1988 UEFA Women's Euro 1989 qualifying Group 4	Czechoslovakia	3–0	Bulgaria	Czechoslovakia
--:-- UTC+2	Štěrbová 18'; Armačková 56', 73' (pen.)	Report		Referee: Gabor Plasek (Hungary)

6 Nov 1988 UEFA Women's Euro 1989 qualifying Group 4	Bulgaria	0–2	France	Sofia, Bulgaria
14:00 UTC+3		Report	Margaria 5'; Mismacq 42'	Stadium: Slavia Stadium; Attendance: 50; Referee: Aleksandr Khokhriakov (Soviet Union)

=== 1989 ===
21 Mar 1989 Friendly	Bulgaria	1–3	West Germany	Sofia, Bulgaria
--:-- UTC+3

14 Oct 1989 UEFA Women's Euro 1991 qualifying Group 4	Czechoslovakia	2–0	Bulgaria	Skuteč, Czechoslovakia
--:-- UTC+2	Buliřová 3', 73'	Report		Attendance: 1,000

28 Oct 1989 UEFA Women's Euro 1991 qualifying Group 4	Bulgaria	0–3	Hungary	Sofia, Bulgaria
--:-- UTC+2				Stadium: Stadion Georgi Asparuhov

=== 1990 ===
11 Apr 1990 UEFA Women's Euro 1991 qualifying Group 4	Bulgaria	1–4	West Germany	Sofia, Bulgaria
--:-- UTC+2	Georgieva 69'	Report	Lohn 9'; Mohr 39'; Damm 67'; Unsleber 88'	Stadium: Stadion Georgi Asparuhov

9 Jun 1990 UEFA Women's Euro 1991 qualifying Group 4	Hungary	2–0	Bulgaria	Hungary
--:-- UTC+2

26 Sept 1990 UEFA Women's Euro 1991 qualifying Group 4	West Germany	4–0	Bulgaria	Düsseldorf, West Germany
--:-- UTC+2	Unsleber 18'; Neid 46', 52'; Mohr 76'	Report		Stadium: Rheinstadion

14 Oct 1990 UEFA Women's Euro 1991 qualifying Group 4	Bulgaria	2–3	Czechoslovakia	Sofia, Bulgaria
--:-- UTC+3				Stadium: Stadion Georgi Asparuhov

=== 1991 ===
1 Apr 1991 1991 Grand Hotel Varna Cup	Bulgaria	Unknown	Hungary	Varna, Bulgaria
--:-- UTC+3		Report

2 Apr 1991 1991 Grand Hotel Varna Cup	Bulgaria	0–3	United States	Varna, Bulgaria
--:-- UTC+3		Report

3 Apr 1991 1991 Grand Hotel Varna Cup	Bulgaria	0–1	Yugoslavia	Varna, Bulgaria
--:-- UTC+3		Report

27 Oct 1991 UEFA Women's Euro 1993 qualifying Group 8	Bulgaria	0–1	Hungary	Bulgaria
--:-- UTC+3

=== 1992 ===
30 Mar 1992 1992 Grand Hotel Varna Cup	Bulgaria	0–2	Poland	Varna, Bulgaria
--:-- UTC+3		Report	Otrębska; Jendryczko

31 Mar 1992 1992 Grand Hotel Varna Cup	Bulgaria	0–2	Sweden U-20	Varna, Bulgaria
--:-- UTC+3		Report	Andersson; Nilsson ?', ?'; Gunskog ?', ?'	Attendance: 200

3 Apr 1992 1992 Grand Hotel Varna Cup	Bulgaria	0–3	Scotland	Varna, Bulgaria
--:-- UTC+3		Report	Lowe ?', ?'; Brown

4 Apr 1992 1992 Grand Hotel Varna Cup	Bulgaria	2–0	Russia XI	Varna, Bulgaria
--:-- UTC+3	Georgieva ?', ?'	Report

31 May 1992 UEFA Women's Euro 1993 qualifying Group 8	Hungary	0–1	Bulgaria	Hungary
--:-- UTC+2

30 Jun 1992 UEFA Women's Euro 1993 qualifying Group 8	Russia	3–0	Bulgaria	Russia
--:-- UTC+3

27 Sept 1992 UEFA Women's Euro 1993 qualifying Group 8	Bulgaria	1–2	Russia	Bulgaria
--:-- UTC+3

=== 1993 ===
10 Sept 1993 UEFA Women's Euro 1995 qualifying Group 3	Lithuania	0–1	Bulgaria	Kaunas, Lithuania
20:00 UTC+3		Report	Kovatscheva 10'	Stadium: S.Dariaus ir S.Girėno Stadium; Referee: Sergey Shmolik (Belarus)

29 Sept 1993 UEFA Women's Euro 1995 qualifying Group 3	Denmark	6–1	Bulgaria	Hjørring, Denmark
16:00 UTC+2	Thychosen 5', 87'; H. Jensen 15', 18'; M. Jensen 37'; Brink 52'	Report	Manova 45'	Stadium: Hjørring Stadion; Attendance: 612; Referee: Lennart Olufsson (Sweden)

13 Oct 1993 UEFA Women's Euro 1995 qualifying Group 3	Bulgaria	1–1	Lithuania	Blagoevgrad, Bulgaria
17:00 UTC+3	Manova 19'	Report	Vashtchilko 88'	Stadium: Hristo Botev Stadium; Referee: Graziano Cesari (Italy)

=== 1994 ===
25 May 1994 UEFA Women's Euro 1995 qualifying Group 3	Bulgaria	0–4	Denmark	Kiustendil, Bulgaria
--:-- UTC+3		Report	Bulgarian Player 7' (o.g.); C. Nielsen 30', 77'; A. Larsen 37'	Stadium: Osogovo Stadium

=== 1995 ===
16 Sept 1995 UEFA Women's Euro 1997 qualifying Group 8	Bulgaria	0–1	Ukraine	Bulgaria
--:-- UTC+3

21 Oct 1995 UEFA Women's Euro 1997 qualifying Group 8	Turkey	0–4	Bulgaria	Istanbul, Turkey
14:30 UTC+3		Report	Kassabova 14', 36', 58', 78'	Stadium: Yusuf Ziya Öniş Stadium

=== 1996 ===
14 Apr 1996 UEFA Women's Euro 1997 qualifying Group 8	Bulgaria	3–2	Hungary	Bulgaria
--:-- UTC+3

19 May 1996 UEFA Women's Euro 1997 qualifying Group 8	Ukraine	2–1	Bulgaria	Ukraine
--:-- UTC+3

16 Jun 1996 UEFA Women's Euro 1997 qualifying Group 8	Bulgaria	3–0	Turkey	Bulgaria
16:00 UTC+3	Diakova 29'; Kutchunova 35'; Kostova 64'	Report		Referee: Serguei Anokhin (Russia)

25 Aug 1996 UEFA Women's Euro 1997 qualifying Group 8	Hungary	1–2	Bulgaria	Hungary
--:-- UTC+3

17 Oct 1996 1996 Grand Hotel Varna Cup	Bulgaria	0–5	Romania	Varna, Bulgaria
--:-- UTC+3		Report

=== 1997 ===
28 Sept 1997 1999 FIFA Women's World Cup qualifying Group 7	Greece	1–5	Bulgaria	Kallikrateia, Greece
--:-- UTC+3

23 Nov 1997 1999 FIFA Women's World Cup qualifying Group 7	Bulgaria	1–2	Turkey	Sofia, Bulgaria
--:-- UTC+3

5 Dec 1997 1999 FIFA Women's World Cup qualifying Group 7	FR Yugoslavia	2–0	Bulgaria	Kruševac, Yugoslavia
--:-- UTC+1

=== 1998 ===
12 Apr 1998 1999 FIFA Women's World Cup qualifying Group 7	Bulgaria	3–0	Greece	Sandanski, Bulgaria
--:-- UTC+3

20 Apr 1998 1998 Albena Cup	Bulgaria	1–4	Romania	Varna, Bulgaria
--:-- UTC+3		Report

6 Jun 1998 1999 FIFA Women's World Cup qualifying Group 7	Bulgaria	1–6	FR Yugoslavia	Sofia, Bulgaria
--:-- UTC+3

20 Jun 1998 1999 FIFA Women's World Cup qualifying Group 7	Turkey	1–1	Bulgaria	Tekirdağ, Turkey
--:-- UTC+3

=== 2000 ===
1 Apr 2000 2000 Albena Cup Group B	Bulgaria	2–2	Romania	Varna, Bulgaria
--:-- UTC+3		Report

3 Apr 2000 2000 Albena Cup Group B	Bulgaria	0–0	Russia	Varna, Bulgaria
--:-- UTC+3		Report

5 Apr 2000 2000 Albena Cup SF	Bulgaria	4–5 (a.e.t.)	United States U-18	Varna, Bulgaria
--:-- UTC+3		Report

3 Apr 2000 2000 Albena Cup 3rd place match	Bulgaria	0–0 (4–3 p)	Russia	Varna, Bulgaria
--:-- UTC+3		Report

=== 2001 ===
2 Apr 2001 2001 Albena Cup Group B	Bulgaria	2–0	Greece	Varna, Bulgaria
--:-- UTC+3		Report

3 Apr 2001 2001 Albena Cup Group B	Bulgaria	2–1	Moldova	Varna, Bulgaria
--:-- UTC+3		Report

4 Apr 2001 2001 Albena Cup Group B	Bulgaria	0–2	Russia	Varna, Bulgaria
--:-- UTC+3		Report

6 Apr 2001 2001 Albena Cup SF	Bulgaria	0–3	North Korea	Varna, Bulgaria
--:-- UTC+3		Report

8 Apr 2001 2001 Albena Cup 3rd place match	Bulgaria	3–1	Russia U-20	Varna, Bulgaria
--:-- UTC+3		Report

=== 2002 ===
2 Apr 2002 2002 Albena Cup	Bulgaria	0–1	Ukraine	Varna, Bulgaria
--:-- UTC+3		Report

3 Apr 2002 2002 Albena Cup	Bulgaria	0–0	Romania	Varna, Bulgaria
--:-- UTC+3		Report

5 Apr 2002 2002 Albena Cup	Bulgaria	0–4	North Korea	Varna, Bulgaria
--:-- UTC+3		Report

7 Apr 2002 2002 Albena Cup	Bulgaria	1–4	Russia	Varna, Bulgaria
--:-- UTC+3		Report

=== 2003 ===
4 Apr 2003 2003 Albena Cup Group A	Bulgaria	0–4	Romania	Albena, Bulgaria
--:-- UTC+3		Report

8 Apr 2003 2003 Albena Cup 5th place match	Bulgaria	0–2	Israel	Albena, Bulgaria
--:-- UTC+3		Report

=== 2004 ===
6 Apr 2004 2004 Albena Cup 3rd place match	Bulgaria	1–1 (2–4 p)	Romania	Albena, Bulgaria
--:-- UTC+3

=== 2006 ===
2 Apr 2006 2006 Albena Cup	Bulgaria	4–2	Kazakhstan	Albena, Bulgaria
--:-- UTC+3

4 Apr 2006 2006 Albena Cup	Bulgaria	1–0	Romania	Albena, Bulgaria
--:-- UTC+3

8 Apr 2006 2006 Albena Cup	Bulgaria	1–2	Ukraine	Albena, Bulgaria
--:-- UTC+3

18 Nov 2006 UEFA Women's Euro 2009 qualifying Group A4	Estonia	0–5	Bulgaria	Otopeni, Romania
14:00 UTC+2		Report	Kostova 14', 21' (pen.), 34', 50'; Petrakieva 37'	Stadium: Stadionul Otopeni; Referee: Yuliya Medvedeva-Keldyusheva (Kazakhstan)

20 Nov 2006 UEFA Women's Euro 2009 qualifying Group A4	Romania	1–0	Bulgaria	Chiajna, Romania
14:00 UTC+2	Pavel 66'	Report		Stadium: Stadionul Concordia; Referee: Rachel Cohen (Israel)

23 Nov 2006 UEFA Women's Euro 2009 qualifying Group A4	Bulgaria	3–0	Azerbaijan	Otopeni, Romania
13:30 UTC+2	Kostova 13'; Petrakieva 36'; Peeva 55'	Report		Stadium: Stadionul Otopeni; Referee: Yuliya Medvedeva-Keldyusheva (Kazakhstan)

=== 2007 ===
4 Nov 2007 2017 UEFA Women's Support International Tournament	Turkey	2–2	Bulgaria	İzmir, Turkey
14:00 UTC+3	Özgüvenç 13'; Düner 82'	Report	Tsekova 2'; Gospodinova 61'	Stadium: Buca Arena; Referee: Venere Muradova (Azerbaijan)

6 Nov 2007 2017 UEFA Women's Support International Tournament	Azerbaijan	1–0	Bulgaria	İzmir, Turkey
--:-- UTC+3				Stadium: Buca Arena

=== 2008 ===
30 May 2008 2008 Albena Cup	Bulgaria	1–1	Bosnia and Herzegovina	Albena, Bulgaria
15:30 UTC+3	Boyanova 38'	Report	Skrbic 28'

3 June 2008 2008 Albena Cup	Bulgaria	4–1	Armenia	Albena, Bulgaria
15:30 UTC+3	Radoyska 23' (pen.); Zhekova 29'; Davidova 51'; Belcheva 59'	Report	Kostanyan 18'

27 Aug 2008 Friendly	Slovenia	0–4	Bulgaria	Dravograd, Slovenia
--:-- UTC+2

30 Oct 2008 Friendly	Bosnia and Herzegovina	1–2	Bulgaria	Bosnia and Herzegovina
--:-- UTC+2

1 Nov 2008 Friendly	Bulgaria	3–2	Kazakhstan	Bosnia and Herzegovina
--:-- UTC+2

=== 2009 ===
5 Jun 2009 Friendly	Bulgaria	5–0	Luxembourg	Ta' Qali, Malta
18:45 UTC+2

7 Jun 2009 Friendly	Latvia	0–4	Bulgaria	Ta' Qali, Malta
18:45 UTC+2

10 Jun 2009 Friendly	Malta	0–1	Bulgaria	Ta' Qali, Malta
16:30 UTC+2

21 Oct 2009 2011 FIFA Women's World Cup qualifying Group 3	Bulgaria	0–1	Greece	Lovech, Bulgaria
15:30 UTC+2		Report	Panteleiadou 53'	Stadium: Gradski Lovech Stadium; Referee: Caroline De Boeck (Belgium)

28 Oct 2009 2011 FIFA Women's World Cup qualifying Group 3	Bulgaria	0–0	Denmark	Lovech, Bulgaria
15:30 UTC+2		Report		Stadium: Gradski Lovech Stadium; Referee: Olga Tanschi (Moldova)

21 Nov 2009 2011 FIFA Women's World Cup qualifying Group 3	Bulgaria	5–0	Georgia	Lovech, Bulgaria
14:00 UTC+2	Nadirashvili 28' (o.g.); Pasikashvili 31' (o.g.); Kostova 51'; Boyanova 65'; Gospodinova 90+1'	Report		Stadium: Gradski Lovech Stadium; Referee: Elia María Martínez Martínez (Spain)

=== 2010 ===
27 Mar 2010 2011 FIFA Women's World Cup qualifying Group 3	Denmark	9–0	Bulgaria	Vejle, Denmark
14:45 UTC+1	J. Rasmussen 6', 21'; K. Pedersen 10'; Munk 37'; Troelsgaard Nielsen 45'; Paaske-Sørensen 53' (pen.), 78'; J. Jensen 55'; Pedersen 90'	Report		Stadium: Vejle Stadion; Referee: Sjoukje De Jong (Netherlands)

1 Apr 2010 2011 FIFA Women's World Cup qualifying Group 3	Scotland	8–1	Bulgaria	Falkirk, Scotland
19:30 UTC+1	Little 39', 87'; Hamill 40'; Fleeting 53', 58', 64', 90'; Grant 60'	Report	Liliana Kostova 21'	Stadium: Falkirk Stadium; Referee: Marija Margareta Damjanović (Croatia)

19 Jun 2010 2011 FIFA Women's World Cup qualifying Group 3	Bulgaria	0–5	Scotland	Sofia, Bulgaria
18:00 UTC+3		Report	Beattie 17'; Fleeting 35'; Little 62' (pen.); Corsie 66'; Hamill 90+2'	Stadium: Georgi Asparuhov Stadium; Referee: Christina Westrum Pedersen (Norway)

21 Aug 2010 2011 FIFA Women's World Cup qualifying Group 3	Georgia	1–1	Bulgaria	Tbilisi, Georgia
17:30 UTC+4	Matveeva 24'	Report	Koshuleva 50'	Stadium: Mikheil Meskhi Stadium; Referee: Anja Kunick (Germany)

25 Aug 2010 2011 FIFA Women's World Cup qualifying Group 3	Greece	1–2	Bulgaria	Arta, Greece
17:30 UTC+3	Kakambouki 5'	Report	Radoyska 69'; Kostova 80' (pen.)	Stadium: Municipal Stadium Arta; Referee: Mihaela Gurdon Bašimamović (Croatia)

24 Nov 2010 Friendly	Wales	8–1	Bulgaria	Wrexham, Wales
--:-- UTC+0

=== 2011 ===
19 May 2011 2013 UEFA Women's Euro qualifying Group 3	Iceland	6–0	Bulgaria	Reykjavík, Iceland
21:30 UTC+2	Viðarsdóttir 6', 36', 72' (pen.), 90+2'; Gunnarsdóttir 12'; Magnúsdóttir 63'	Report		Stadium: Laugardalsvollur; Attendance: 1,371; Referee: Floarea Ionescu (Romania)

12 Oct 2011 Friendly	Bulgaria	4–4	North Macedonia	Blagoevgrad, Bulgaria
--:-- UTC+3

13 Oct 2011 Friendly	Bulgaria	2–3	North Macedonia	Blagoevgrad, Bulgaria
--:-- UTC+3

22 Oct 2011 2013 UEFA Women's Euro qualifying Group 3	Bulgaria	0–1	Northern Ireland	Lovech, Bulgaria
15:00 UTC+2		Report	Stephens 10'	Stadium: Lovech Stadium; Attendance: 24; Referee: Gordana Kuzmanović (Serbia)

27 Oct 2011 2013 UEFA Women's Euro qualifying Group 3	Bulgaria	0–4	Hungary	Lovech, Bulgaria
15:00 UTC+2		Report	Vágó 24' (pen.), 33'; Sipos 36', 71'	Stadium: Lovech Stadium; Attendance: 150; Referee: Betina Norman (Denmark)

19 Nov 2011 2013 UEFA Women's Euro qualifying Group 3	Belgium	5–0	Bulgaria	Dessel, Belgium
16:00 UTC+2	Zeler 5', 56'; Wiard 14', 43'; van Gils 70'	Report		Stadium: Lorzestraat; Attendance: 867; Referee: Zuzana Kováčová (Slovakia)

23 Nov 2011 2013 UEFA Women's Euro qualifying Group 3	Bulgaria	0–1	Belgium	Lovech, Bulgaria
13:00 UTC+2		Report	Demoustier 13'	Stadium: Lovech Stadium; Attendance: 30; Referee: Stéphanie Frappart (France)

=== 2012 ===
31 Mar 2012 2013 UEFA Women's Euro qualifying Group 3	Bulgaria	0–3	Norway	Lovech, Bulgaria
13:00 UTC+2		Report	Tofte Ims 70'; Hansen 90', 90+4'	Stadium: Lovech Stadium; Attendance: 100; Referee: Ausra Kance (Lithuania)

19 May 2012 2013 UEFA Women's Euro qualifying Group 3	Northern Ireland	4–1	Bulgaria	Belfast, Northern Ireland
16:00 UTC+2	Magill 3'; McGuinness 5'; Kireva 44' (o.g.); Milligan 55'	Report	Gospodinova 34'	Stadium: Solitude; Attendance: 275; Referee: Linn Andersson (Sweden)

16 Jun 2012 2013 UEFA Women's Euro qualifying Group 3	Norway	11–0	Bulgaria	Sarpsborg, Norway
14:30 UTC+2	Herlovsen 8', 12', 30', 43', 47'; Mjelde 22', 34'; Hansen 48'; Pedersen 78'; Knudsen 80'; Voyskova 83' (o.g.)	Report		Stadium: Sarpsborg Stadion; Attendance: 642; Referee: Sandra Braz Bastos (Portugal)

21 Jun 2012 2013 UEFA Women's Euro qualifying Group 3	Bulgaria	0–10	Iceland	Lovech, Bulgaria
17:00 UTC+2		Report	Jónsdóttir 10', 80'; Gunnarsdóttir 29', 50'; Viðarsdóttir 36', 49'; Brynjarsdóttir 64'; Ómarsdóttir 67'; Bjarnadóttir 70'; Lárusdóttir 73'	Stadium: Lovech Stadium; Attendance: 50; Referee: Elia Martinez (Spain)

19 Sept 2012 2013 UEFA Women's Euro qualifying Group 3	Hungary	9–0	Bulgaria	Sopron, Hungary
15:30 UTC+2	Vágó 12' (pen.), 14', 52', 54'; Sipos 37'; Zágor 46'; Rácz 73', 74'; Pádár 76'	Report		Stadium: Stadion Városi; Attendance: 65; Referee: Hilal Tuba Tosun Ayer (Turkey)

=== 2013 ===
20 Aug 2013 Friendly	North Macedonia	2–4	Bulgaria	Skopje, North Macedonia
--:-- UTC+2

22 Aug 2013 Friendly	North Macedonia	2–5	Bulgaria	Skopje, North Macedonia
--:-- UTC+2

21 Sept 2013 2015 FIFA Women's World Cup qualifying Group 7	Austria	4–0	Bulgaria	Vöcklabruck, Austria
18:30 UTC+2	Burger 33'; Feiersinger 81'; Boycheva 90' (o.g.); Pöltl 90+1'	Report		Stadium: Voralpenstadion; Attendance: 1,000; Referee: Simona Ghisletta (Switzerland)

26 Oct 2013 2015 FIFA Women's World Cup qualifying Group 7	Bulgaria	1–1	Kazakhstan	Lovech, Hungary
14:30 UTC+2	Kireva 43'	Report	Radoyska 26' (o.g.)	Stadium: Lovech Stadium; Attendance: 100; Referee: Gordana Kuzmanović (Serbia)

31 Oct 2013 2015 FIFA Women's World Cup qualifying Group 7	Hungary	4–0	Bulgaria	Budapest, Hungary
17:00 UTC+1	B. Szabó 4'; Vágó 40' (pen.); Sipos 70'; Zeller 76'	Report		Stadium: Bozsik Stadion; Attendance: 300; Referee: Linn Andersson (Sweden)

23 Nov 2013 2015 FIFA Women's World Cup qualifying Group 7	Bulgaria	0–10	France	Lovech, Bulgaria
18:00 UTC+1		Report	Delie 2', 6', 10'; Thiney 9', 75', 80'; Renard 19', 34'; Bussaglia 73'; Le Sommer 81'	Stadium: Lovech Stadium; Attendance: 200; Referee: Esther Staubli (Switzerland)

27 Nov 2013 2015 FIFA Women's World Cup qualifying Group 7	France	14–0	Bulgaria	Le Mans, France
20:50 UTC+1	Thiney 1', 4', 11', 41', 83'; Le Sommer 3', 24', 45+1', 90'; Nécib 6'; Renard 21', 37'; Abily 48'; Georges 57'	Report		Stadium: MMArena; Attendance: 13,355; Referee: Floarea Ionescu (Romania)

=== 2014 ===
5 Apr 2014 2015 FIFA Women's World Cup qualifying Group 7	Bulgaria	1–6	Austria	Lovech, Bulgaria
14:30 UTC+2	Radoyska 66'	Report	Burger 4'; Pöltl 8', 41'; Puntigam 43'; Aschauer 51'; Makas 56'	Stadium: Lovech Stadium; Attendance: 300; Referee: Knarik Grigoryan (Armenia)

7 May 2014 2015 FIFA Women's World Cup qualifying Group 7	Kazakhstan	4–1	Bulgaria	Astana, Kazakhstan
10:00 UTC+2	Zhanatayeva 9'; Kirgizbaeva 21', 34'; Yalova 70'	Report	Kireva 43'	Stadium: Astana Arena; Attendance: 500; Referee: Karolina Radzik-Johan (Poland)

18 Jun 2014 2015 FIFA Women's World Cup qualifying Group 7	Finland	4–0	Bulgaria	Helsinki, Finland
17:00 UTC+2	Alanen 20'; Talonen 78'; Hyyrynen 85'; Saarinen 88'	Report		Stadium: Sonera Stadium; Attendance: 911; Referee: Petra Chudá (Slovakia)

21 Aug 2014 2015 FIFA Women's World Cup qualifying Group 7	Bulgaria	0–8	Finland	Lovech, Bulgaria
17:00 UTC+2		Report	Sjölund 6'; Saarinen 9'; Saari 14'; Talonen 38', 49', 53'; Alanen 41'; Ruutu 75'	Stadium: Lovech Stadium; Attendance: 80; Referee: Lilach Asulin (Israel)

17 Sept 2014 2015 FIFA Women's World Cup qualifying Group 7	Bulgaria	0–7	Hungary	Lovech, Bulgaria
16:00 UTC+2		Report	Csiszár 30'; Sipos 39', 90'; Vágó 51', 64', 67', 71'	Stadium: Lovech Stadium; Attendance: 50; Referee: Sofia Karagiorgi (Cyprus)

=== 2016 ===
6 Apr 2016 Friendly	Bulgaria	0–2	Cyprus	Tryavna, Bulgaria
--:-- UTC+3

8 Apr 2016 Friendly	Bulgaria	3–1	Cyprus	Tryavna, Bulgaria
--:-- UTC+3

=== 2017 ===
6 Apr 2017 Friendly	Cyprus	0–1	Bulgaria	Lakatamia, Cyprus
--:-- UTC+3

8 Apr 2017 Friendly	Cyprus	1–1	Bulgaria	Lakatamia, Cyprus
--:-- UTC+3

7 Jun 2017 Friendly	Hungary	4–0	Bulgaria	Balmazújváros, Hungary
--:-- UTC+3

9 Dec 2017 Friendly	Bulgaria	0–2	Albania	Sofia, Bulgaria
--:-- UTC+3

12 Dec 2017 Friendly	Bulgaria	3–0	Albania	Sofia, Bulgaria
--:-- UTC+3

=== 2019 ===
14 Jun 2019 Friendly	Bulgaria	0–6	Croatia	Sofia, Bulgaria
--:-- UTC+3

17 Jun 2019 Friendly	Bulgaria	1–3	Croatia	Sofia, Bulgaria
--:-- UTC+3
Note: Abandoned after 56 minutes due to heavy rain

=== 2020 ===
20 Sept 2020 Friendly	Luxembourg	0–3	Bulgaria	Luxembourg City, Luxembourg
--:-- UTC+2		Report	Naydenova; Popadinova; Krier (o.g.)	Stadium: Stade Avenir Beggen

27 Oct 2021 Friendly	Serbia	2–1	Bulgaria	Stara Pazova, Serbia
--:-- UTC+1	Damjanović 16'; trbojević 89'	Report	Parapunova 90+4'	Stadium: Serbian FA Sports Center

=== 2021 ===
11 Jun 2021 Friendly	Bulgaria	0–1	Bosnia and Herzegovina	Sofia, Bulgaria
18:00 UTC+3		Report

14 Jun 2021 Friendly	Turkey	3–1	Bulgaria	Istanbul, Turkey
18:00 UTC+3		Report

18 Sept 2021 2023 FIFA Women's World Cup qualifying Group H	Germany	7–0	Bulgaria	Cottbus, Germany
16:07 UTC+2	Schüller 21', 72'; Magull 24', 33'; Dallmann 67', 82'; Waßmuth 76'	Report		Stadium: Stadion der Freundschaft; Referee: Ivana Projkovska (North Macedonia)

21 Oct 2021 2023 FIFA Women's World Cup qualifying Group H	Turkey	1–0	Bulgaria	Istanbul, Turkey
18:00 UTC+3	Uraz 76'	Report		Stadium: Esenyurt Necmi Kadıoğlu Stadium; Referee: Jurgita Mačikunytė (Lithuania)

26 Oct 2021 2023 FIFA Women's World Cup qualifying Group H	Bulgaria	0–5	Portugal	Plovdiv, Bulgaria
18:00 UTC+3		Report	Ivanova 3' (o.g.); Di. Silva 5', 57'; Gomes 71'; C. Costa 76' (pen.)	Stadium: Stadion Lokomotiv; Referee: Alina Peşu (Romania)

25 Nov 2021 2023 FIFA Women's World Cup qualifying Group H	Serbia	3–0	Bulgaria	Stara Pazova, Serbia
16:00 UTC+1	Damnjanović 31', 59'; Damjanović 84'	Report		Stadium: Serbian FA Sports Center; Referee: Vera Opeykina (Russia)

30 Nov 2021 2023 FIFA Women's World Cup qualifying Group H	Bulgaria	1–4	Serbia	Plovdiv, Bulgaria
16:00 UTC+2	Naydenova 49'	Report	Mijatović 20'; Milivojević 33'; Damnjanović 45', 89'	Stadium: Stadion Lokomotiv; Referee: Ainara Acevedo (Spain)

=== 2022 ===
16 Feb 2022 2022 Turkish Women's Cup	Bulgaria	1–1	Latvia	Alanya, Turkey
10:00 UTC+3	Naydenova 88' (pen.)	Report	Voitāne 24' (pen.)	Stadium: Gold City Sport Complex; Referee: Melis Özçiğdem (Turkey)

19 Feb 2022 2022 Turkish Women's Cup	Bulgaria	2–3	Lithuania	Alanya, Turkey
14:00 UTC+3	Petrova 9'; Dineva 43'	Report	Zabolotnaja 19'; Vaitukaitytė 21', 84'	Stadium: Gold City Sport Complex; Referee: Gamze Durmuş (Turkey)

22 Feb 2022 2022 Turkish Women's Cup	Ukraine	2–0	Bulgaria	Alanya, Turkey
13:30 UTC+3	Voronina 58'; Apanashchenko 90+1'	Report		Stadium: Gold City Sport Complex; Referee: Gamze Durmuş (Turkey)

7 Apr 2022 2023 FIFA Women's World Cup qualifying Group H	Bulgaria	0–2	Turkey	Plovdiv, Bulgaria
16:00 UTC+3		Report	Türkoğlu 41'; Topçu 88'	Stadium: Stadion Lokomotiv; Referee: Tanja Račić (Bosnia and Herzegovina)

12 Apr 2022 2023 FIFA Women's World Cup qualifying Group H	Portugal	3–0	Bulgaria	Barcelos, Portugal
19:00 UTC+1	Di. Silva 18'; Marques 26'; C. Costa 42'	Report		Stadium: Estádio Cidade de Barcelos; Referee: Ivana Martinčić (Croatia)

23 Jun 2022 2023 FIFA Women's World Cup qualifying Group H	Bulgaria	0–2	Israel	Plovdiv, Bulgaria
19:00 UTC+3		Report	Selimhodzic 29'; Avital 32'	Stadium: Stadion Lokomotiv; Referee: Martina Molinaro (Italy)

1 Sept 2022 2023 FIFA Women's World Cup qualifying Group H	Israel	2–0	Bulgaria	Ness Ziona, Israel
19:30 UTC+2	Avital 54'; Sharabi 73'	Report		Stadium: Ness Ziona Stadium; Referee: Araksya Saribekyan (Armenia)

6 Sept 2022 2023 FIFA Women's World Cup qualifying Group H	Bulgaria	0–8	Germany	Plovdiv, Bulgaria
19:30 UTC+3		Report	Schüller 35', 45+1', 52'; Freigang 45', 64', 87'; Lohmann 54'; Huth 81' (pen.)	Stadium: Stadion Lokomotiv; Attendance: 200; Referee: Elvira Nurmustafina (Kazakhstan)

=== 2023 ===
15 February 2023 Turkish Women's Cup	Bulgaria	2–0	Hong Kong	Alanya, Turkey
15:00	Popadinova 11'; Naydenova 22'	Report		Stadium: Gold City Sport Complex

18 February 2023 Turkish Women's Cup	North Macedonia	1–2	Bulgaria	Alanya, Turkey
11:00	Rochi 9'		Yaneva 15'; Popadinova 87'	Stadium: Gold City Sport Complex

21 February 2023 Turkish Women's Cup	Bulgaria	1–2	Kosovo	Alanya, Turkey
11:00				Stadium: Gold City Sport Complex

6 April BFU International Women's Cup 2023 SF	Bulgaria	3–0	Lithuania	Sofia, Bulgaria
11:00 UTC+2	Yaneva 23'; Dimitrova 55'; Karadzhova 81'			Stadium: Boyana Sports Complex

10 April BFU International Women's Cup 2023 F	Bulgaria	0–1	Kosovo	Sofia, Bulgaria
--:-- UTC+2				Stadium: Boyana Sports Complex

16 July Friendly	Romania	2–0	Bulgaria

22 September 2023 Nations League C	North Macedonia	0–1	Bulgaria	Skopje
15:00		Report	Stankova 4'	Stadium: Petar Miloševski Training Centre; Attendance: 200; Referee: Miriama Bočková (Slovakia)

27 September Nations League C	Bulgaria	0–0	Kosovo	Plovdiv
17:00 (18:00 EEST)		Report		Stadium: Stadion Lokomotiv; Referee: Lovisa Johansson (Sweden)

1 December 2023 Nations League C	Kosovo	5–1	Bulgaria	Podujevo
13:00	Halilaj 39'; Metaj 58'; Uka 71'; Memeti 84', 89'	Report	Ivanova 26'	Stadium: Zahir Pajaziti Stadium; Attendance: 120; Referee: Meliz Özçiğdem (Turkey)

5 December 2023 Nations League C	Bulgaria	2–2	North Macedonia	Plovdiv
16:00 (17:00 EET)		Report		Stadium: Stadion Lokomotiv; Referee: Alexandra Collin (France)

=== 2024 ===
23 February 2023–24 UEFA Women's Nations League promotion/relegation matches	Bulgaria	0–4	Ukraine	Kardzhali
15:00 (16:00 EET)		Report	Kravchuk 6'; Andrukhiv 24'; Hlushchenko 82'; Shmatko 90'	Stadium: Arena Arda

27 February 2023–24 UEFA Women's Nations League promotion/relegation matches	Ukraine	3–0 (7–0 agg.)	Bulgaria	Antalya, Turkey (Note: Due to the Russian invasion of Ukraine, Ukraine are required to play their home matches at neutral venues until further notice.)
14:00 (16:00 TRT)		Report		Stadium: Mardan Sports Complex
Note: Ukraine won 7–0 on aggregate, and therefore both teams remained in their respective leagues.

5 April 2024 Euro 2025 qualifying League C	Kazakhstan	0–1	Bulgaria	Almaty
13:00 (16:00 UTC+5)		Report	Petkova 45+5'	Stadium: Almaty Central Stadium; Referee: Meliz Özçiğdem (Turkey)

9 April UEFA Women's Euro 2025 qualifying League C GS	Bulgaria	2–3	Armenia	Sofia
18:00 UTC+3)		Report		Stadium: Stadion Aleksandar Shalamanov; Referee: Emilie Torkelsen (Norway)

31 May UEFA Women's Euro 2025 qualifying League C GS	Romania	1–0	Bulgaria	Bucharest
18:00 (19:00 UTC+3)	Vătafu 76'	Report		Stadium: Stadionul Arcul de Triumf; Attendance: 1,709; Referee: Kathrin Huber (Austria)

4 June UEFA Women's Euro 2025 qualifying League C GS	Bulgaria	0–3	Romania	Sofia
18:00 (19:00 UTC+3)		Report	Vătafu 39'; Carp 51'; Herczeg 79'	Stadium: Stadion Aleksandar Shalamanov; Attendance: 176; Referee: Jurgita Mačikunytė (Lithuania)

12 July UEFA Women's Euro 2025 qualifying League C GS	Armenia	1–3	Bulgaria	Yerevan, Armenia
19:45 UTC+4)		Report		Stadium: Vazgen Sargsyan Republican Stadium

16 July UEFA Women's Euro 2025 qualifying League C GS	Bulgaria	0–0	Kazakhstan	Sofia
19:00 (20:00 UTC+3)		Report		Stadium: Stadion Aleksandar Shalamanov

=== 2025 ===
21 February 2025 2025 UEFA Nations League C	Israel	1–3	Bulgaria	Sofia, Bulgaria
13:30	Petrova 36'	Report (UEFA); Report (Sport5)	Awad 39'; Sommer 40'; Avital 63'	Stadium: Stadion Aleksandar Shalamanov; Attendance: 177; Referee: Milica Milovanović (Serbia)

4 April 2025 2025 UEFA Nations League C	Estonia	0–0	Bulgaria	Tallinn, Estonia
18:00 UTC+2		Report		Stadium: Lilleküla Stadium; Attendance: 457; Referee: Stacey Pearson (England)

8 April 2025 2025 UEFA Nations League C	Israel	3–3	Bulgaria	Budaörs, Hungary
13:00 UTC+2	Avital 18'; Sommer 41', 45+4'	Report	D. Ivanova 12'; Rasina 15'; Boycheva 50'	Stadium: BSC Stadium; Referee: Sara Telek (Austria)

3 June 2025 2025 UEFA Nations League C	Bulgaria	0–1	Estonia	Sofia, Bulgaria
19:00 UTC+2	Boycheva (red card) 44'; Zheleva (penalty missed) 90+4'	Report	Teern 90+1'	Stadium: Stadion Aleksandar Shalamanov; Attendance: 470; Referee: Ioanna Allayiotou (Cyprus)

=== 2026 ===
3 March 2026 2027 FIFA Women's World Cup qualification	Bulgaria	0–1	Croatia	Sofia, Bulgaria
11:00		Report (FIFA); Report (UEFA)	Vunić 80'	Stadium: Stadion Aleksandar Shalamanov; Attendance: 310; Referee: Araksya Saribekyan (Armenia)

7 March 2026 2027 FIFA Women's World Cup qualification	Bulgaria	0–5	Gibraltar	Europa Point, Gibraltar
19:00		Report (FIFA); Report (UEFA)	Borrell 2' (o.g.); Rasina 39'; D. Ivanova 84', 85'; I. Naydenova 90+4'	Stadium: Europa Point Stadium; Attendance: 361; Referee: Laura Mauricio (Switzerland)

14 April 2026 2027 FIFA Women's World Cup qualification	Bulgaria	1–3	Kosovo	Sofia, Bulgaria
16:00	Yaneva 9'	Report (FIFA); Report (UEFA)	Memeti 15'; Smaili 21'; Fejza 89'	Stadium: Stadion Aleksandar Shalamanov; Attendance: 250; Referee: Zoe Stavrou (Cyprus)

== See also ==
- Bulgaria national football team results
- Football in Bulgaria
