= 1989 European Competition for Women's Football qualifying =

Football tournament qualification stage

The qualification for the 1989 European Competition for Women's Football was held between 10 September 1987 and 17 December 1988. The winners of the quarter-finals qualified.

== Group stage ==
=== Group 1 ===
Team	GP	W	D	L	GF	GA	Pts
Denmark	6	5	0	1	12	6	10
Norway	6	2	1	3	10	10	5
England	6	2	1	3	6	10	5
Finland	6	1	2	3	9	11	4

10 September 1987

Finland	3–3	Norway
Sarlin 36'; Sundman 39'; Toikka 47'	NFF Report (in Norwegian); Moss Avis Report (in Norwegian)	Bakken 12'; Hegstad 29'; Nielsen 80'

Kalevan urheilupuisto, Kerava
Attendance: 1,500
Referee: Davidsen

7 October 1987

Norway	0–1	Denmark
	DBU Report (in Danish); NFF Report (in Norwegian); Fremover report (in Norwegian)	Jensen 6'

Ullevaal Stadion, Oslo
Attendance: 436 (also reported as 716)
Referee: Jim McCluskey (Scotland)

25 October 1987

Finland	1–2	England
Sarlin 79'		Curl 55'; Stanley 66'

Urheilukenttä, Kirkkonummi
Referee: Wieland Ziller (West Germany)

8 November 1987

England	2–1	Denmark
Spacey 34'; Davis 40' (pen.)	DBU Report (in Danish)	Ja. Hansen 44'

Ewood Park, Blackburn
Attendance: 700
Referee: John Lloyd (Wales)

8 May 1988
15:00

Denmark	2–0	England
Jacobsen 5'; Obel 58'	DBU Report (in Danish)

MCH Arena, Herning
Attendance: 1,200
Referee: Rune Larsson (Sweden)

26 May 1988

Norway	0–2	Finland
	NFF Report (in Norwegian); Rogalands Avis report (in Norwegian)	Toikka 17'; Järnfors 57'

Idrettssenteret, Nesbyen
Attendance: 1,200
Referee: Friðgeir Hallgrímsson (Iceland)

28 May 1988

Denmark	3–1	Finland
Gam-Pedersen; Smidt Nielsen; Obel	DBU Report (in Danish)	?? 48'

Valby Idrætspark, Copenhagen
Attendance: 424

21 August 1988

Norway	2–0	England
Medalen; Scheel Aalbu	NFF Report (in Norwegian)

Klepp Stadion, Kleppe
Attendance: 1,517
Referee: Bo Helén (Sweden)

24 August 1988

Finland	1–2	Denmark
??	DBU Report (in Danish)	Ja. Hansen; Gam-Pedersen

Hakunilan Urheilupuisto, Vantaa

4 September 1988
13:30

Denmark	3–2	Norway
Smidt Nielsen 31', 70'; Obel 57'	DBU Report (in Danish); NFF Report (in Norwegian)	Grude 34'; Nyborg 65'

Aalborg Stadion, Aalborg
Attendance: 1,200
Referee: Sveinn Sveinsson (Iceland)

4 September 1988

England	1–1	Finland
Spacey		Kaasinen

The Old Den, London
Referee: Keith Burge (England)

18 September 1988

England	1–3	Norway
Walker 13'	NFF report (in Norwegian); Moss Dagblad report (in Norwegian)	Zaborowski 43'; Haugen 51' (pen.); Hegstad 62'

Ewood Park, Blackburn
Attendance: 300
Referee: Frederick McKnight (Northern Ireland)

=== Group 2 ===
Team	GP	W	D	L	GF	GA	Pts
Netherlands	4	3	1	0	4	0	7
Sweden	4	1	2	1	5	2	4
Republic of Ireland	4	0	1	3	1	8	1
Scotland	0	0	0	0	0	0	0

30 September 1987

Sweden	0–0	Netherlands
	KNVB Report (in Dutch); SvFF Report (in Swedish)

Folkungavallen, Linköping
Attendance: 1,350
Referee: Olavi Fast (Finland)

7 November 1987

Netherlands	4–0	Scotland
Timisela 12'; Wiegman 20' de Bakker 68', 70'	KNVB Report (in Dutch)

Sportpark De Kollenberg, Nuth
Referee: Lucien Kayser (Luxembourg)

29 November 1987
14:30

Republic of Ireland	0–1	Netherlands
	KNVB Report (in Dutch); FAI Report	de Bakker 38'

Dalymount Park, Dublin
Referee: John Martin (England)

12 March 1988
16:00

Netherlands	2–0	Republic of Ireland
Timisela 30' de Winter 60'	KNVB Report (in Dutch); FAI Report

Sportpark Brasserskade, Delft
Attendance: 1,500
Referee: Frans Van Den Wijngaert (Belgium)

3 April 1988
15:00

Republic of Ireland	2–1	Scotland
?? 32' ?? 62'	FAI Report	?? 70'

Tolka Park, Dublin
Referee: Denis Mcardle (Ireland)

7 May 1988
15:00

Republic of Ireland	1–1	Sweden
McLoughlin 75'	FAI Report; SvFF Report (in Swedish)	Axén 15'

Dalymount Park, Dublin
Attendance: 200
Referee: Patrick Kelly (Ireland)

18 September 1988
13:30

Sweden	4–0	Republic of Ireland
Sundhage 31', 82'; Andelén 50', 78'	FAI Report; SvFF Report (in Swedish)

Lekevi IP, Mariestad
Attendance: 1,250
Referee: Kjell Nordby (Norway)

1 October 1988

Netherlands	1–0	Sweden
de Bakker 79'	KNVB Report (in Dutch); SvFF Report (in Swedish)

Sportpark Het Valkennest, Valkenswaard
Attendance: 1,200
Referee: Erny Kesseler (Luxembourg)

Scotland withdrew.

=== Group 3 ===
Team	GP	W	D	L	GF	GA	Pts
West Germany	6	4	2	0	18	0	10
Italy	6	3	2	1	16	4	8
Hungary	6	1	1	4	8	14	3
Switzerland	6	1	1	4	4	28	3

7 October 1987

Hungary	0–1	West Germany
	DFB Report (in German)	Fitschen 46'

Ferenc Puskás Stadium, Budapest

14 November 1987
13:00

Hungary	7–1	Switzerland
Till 32'; A. Nagy 52', 53', 57'; Bárfy 62'; T. Nagy 64'; Főfai 72'	ASF-SFV Report (in German)	N. Poncioni 35'

Tiszaligeti Stadion, Szolnok
Attendance: 1,300
Referee: Gerald Losert (Austria)
Match info

15 November 1987

West Germany	3–0	Italy
Fitschen 26', 72'; Unsleber 70'	DFB Report (in German); FIGC Report (in Italian)

Wacker Arena, Burghausen
Referee: Ignace Goris (Belgium)

2 April 1988

Italy	0–0	West Germany
	DFB Report (in German); FIGC Report (in Italian)

Stadio Degli Ulivi, Andria
Referee: Jean-Marie Lartigot (France)

30 April 1988

Italy	5–1	Hungary
Saldi 11'; Vignotto 28', 36'; Carta 49', 59'	FIGC Report (in Italian)	I. Kiss 83'

Stadio Riviera delle Palme, San Benedetto del Tronto
Referee: Skapuollatis (Greece)

14 May 1988

West Germany	0–0	Switzerland
	DFB Report (in German); ASF-SFV Report (in German)

Stadion im Brötzinger Tal, Pforzheim
Attendance: 1,200
Referee: Jean Lemmer (Luxembourg)
Match info

11 June 1988
17:30

Switzerland	3–0	Hungary
D. Conrad 32', 48'; N. Poncioni 73'	ASF-SFV Report (in German)

Neudorf Stadion, Zürich
Attendance: 391
Referee: Roman Steindl (Austria)
Match info

18 June 1988

Italy	5–0	Switzerland
Vignotto 39'; D'Astolfo 58', 71'; Carta 60', 62'	FIGC Report (in Italian); ASF-SFV Report (in German)

Campo Sportivo Moltedi, Levanto
Attendance: 650
Referee: Patrick Fenek (Malta)
Match info

17 September 1988

Switzerland	0–10	West Germany
	DFB Report (in German); ASF-SFV Report (in German)	Neid 14'; Mohr 24', 33', 62', 69'; Krause 36'; Sonn 43', 55'; Voss 73'; Raith 79'

Spiegelfeld, Binningen
Attendance: 700
Referee: Michel Girard (France)
Match info

8 October 1988

Hungary	0–0	Italy
	FIGC Report (in Italian)

Városi Sporttelep, Baja

30 October 1988

Switzerland	0–6	Italy
	FIGC Report (in Italian); ASF-SFV Report (in German)	Morace 14', 58'; Vignotto 52', 68', 79' (pen.); Carta 65'

Stadio Comunale, Caslano
Attendance: 500
Referee: Friedrich Kaupe (Austria)
Match info

30 October 1988

West Germany	4–0	Hungary
Krause 30'; Unsleber 44' (pen.); Raith 48'; Fitschen 56'	DFB Report (in German)

Dreiflüssestadion, Passau

=== Group 4 ===
Team	GP	W	D	L	GF	GA	Pts
France	8	4	4	0	14	3	12
Czechoslovakia	8	4	4	0	10	3	12
Belgium	8	2	4	2	7	4	8
Spain	8	2	2	4	4	8	6
Bulgaria	8	0	2	6	1	18	2

11 October 1987

Bulgaria	1–1	Spain

Sofia
Referee: Octavian Streng (Romania)

18 October 1987
19:00

Belgium	1–1	Czechoslovakia
Verdonck 80'	KBVB Report (in Dutch); Report (in Czech)	Procházková ??'

Pierre Cornelis Stadion, Aalst
Referee: Jean-Pierre Schon (Luxembourg)

24 October 1987
15:00

Belgium	0–2	France
	Report (in French); KBVB Report (in Dutch)	Puentes 10'; Musset 13'

Stade Le Canonnier, Mouscron
Attendance: 500
Referee: Keith W. Burge (Wales)

8 November 1987

Czechoslovakia	1–0	Spain
Michalcová 31'	Report (in Czech)

Petržalka, Bratislava
Attendance: 1,000
Referee: Bela Szabo (Hungary)

21 November 1987

France	5–0	Bulgaria
Mismacq 10' (pen.); Puentes 37'; Breton 68'; Musset 70'; Baracat 72'	Report (in French)

Stade Jean Boudrie, Lucé
Attendance: 1,800
Referee: José Veiga Trigo (Portugal)

19 December 1987
15:45

Spain	1–0	Belgium
	KBVB Report (in Dutch)

Estadio El Deleite, Aranjuez
Referee: Jose Francisco Conceicao Silva (Portugal)

6 March 1988

Spain	1–3	France
Artola 77'	Report (in French)	Musset 7', 59'; Loisel 67'

Palma del Río
Attendance: 5,000
Referee: Tullio Lanese (Italy)

20 March 1988

Spain	1–0	Bulgaria

Torrent
Referee: René Bindels (Luxembourg)

2 April 1988
16:00

Czechoslovakia	0–0	Belgium
	KBVB Report (in Dutch); Report (in Czech)

Stadion U Červených domků, Hodonín
Referee: Janusz Eksztajn (Poland)

9 April 1988
14:00

Bulgaria	0–0	Belgium
	KVBV Report (in Dutch)

Slavia Stadium, Sofia
Referee: Dimitrios Naoum (Greece)

23 April 1988

France	0–0	Spain
	Report (in French)

Castelsarrasin
Attendance: 1,000
Referee: Michael Caulfield (Ireland)

24 April 1988

Bulgaria	0–1	Czechoslovakia
	Report (in Slovak)	Chmelová

Stanke Dimitrov
Attendance: 15,000
Referee: Costas Kapsos (Cyprus)

7 May 1988

France	2–2	Czechoslovakia
Romagnoli 34'; Loisel 42'	Report (in French)	J. Paolettiová-Nováková 71'; Farmačková 80' (pen.)

Thonon
Attendance: 3,000
Referee: Rodger Gifford (Wales)

14 May 1988

Spain	0–2	Czechoslovakia
	Report (in Czech)	J. Paolettiová-Nováková 52'; E. Nováková 58'

Vilatenim, Figueres
Attendance: 2,000
Referee: Vitor M. Fernandes Correia (Portugal)

22 May 1988
16:00

France	0–0	Belgium
	Report (in French); KBVB Report (in Dutch)

Stade Louis Berro, Loison-sous-Lens
Attendance: 1,500
Referee: Jacobus van der Niet (Netherlands)

1 October 1988
15:00

Belgium	5–0	Bulgaria
Note*; Gevers; Cotman; Kinnaer; Van Herle	KBVB Report (in Dutch)

Bergéstadion, Tienen
Referee: Karl-Josef Assenmacher (West Germany)

Note*: KBVB report is unclear about the first goal, attributing the goal to both Marina Verdonck and Nathalie Schrymecker.

8 October 1988

Czechoslovakia	0–0	France
	Report (in French)

Stovky Stadion, Frýdek-Místek
Referee: Piotr Werner (Poland)

23 October 1988

Czechoslovakia	3–0	Bulgaria
Štěrbová 18'; Farmačková 56', 73' (pen.)	Report (in Czech)

Czechoslovakia
Attendance: 900
Referee: Gabor Plasek (Hungary)

29 October 1988
15:00

Belgium	1–0	Spain
Verdonck 73'	KBVB Report (in Dutch)

Veltwijckstadion, Antwerp
Referee: Allan Gunn (England)

6 November 1988

Bulgaria	0–2	France
	Report (in French)	Margaria 5'; Mismacq 42'

Sofia
Attendance: 50
Referee: Aleksandr Khokhriakov (USSR)

== Quarterfinals ==
Team #1	Agg.	Team #2	1st leg	2nd leg
Denmark	2–6	Sweden	1–5	1–1
Norway	5–1	Netherlands	2–1	3–0
Czechoslovakia	1–3	West Germany	1–1	0–2
Italy	4–1	France	2–0	2–1

=== First leg ===
15 October 1988
15:00

Denmark	1–5	Sweden
Smidt Nielsen 51' (pen.)	DBU Report (in Danish); SvFF Report (in Swedish)	Videkull 2', 29'; Sundhage 40'; Hansson 75'; Andelén 81'

Atletikstadion, Odense
Attendance: 375
Referee: Guðmundur Haraldsson (Iceland)

22 October 1988

Norway	2–1	Netherlands
Grude 6'; Storhaug 15'	KNVB Report (in Dutch); NFF Report (in Norwegian)	de Bakker 54'

Lystlunden, Horten
Attendance: 623
Referee: Wolf-Günter Wiesel (Germany)

27 November 1988

Italy	2–0	France
Morace 16', 46'	Report (in French); FIGC Report (in Italian)

Stadio Mirabello, Reggio Emilia
Attendance: 3,000
Referee: Charles Agius (Malta)

26 November 1988

Czechoslovakia	1–1	West Germany
E. Nováková 21'	DFB Report (in German)	Bindl 49'

Štadión Petržalka, Bratislava
Attendance: 5,000
Referee: Ion Crăciunescu (Romania)

=== Second leg ===
26 October 1988
17:30

Sweden	1–1	Denmark
Videkull 2'	DBU Report (in Danish); SvFF Report (in Swedish)	Bagge 16'

Ryavallen, Borås
Attendance: 595
Referee: Eeko Aho (Finland)

5 November 1988

Netherlands	0–3	Norway
	KNVB Report (in Dutch); NFF Report (in Norwegian)	Grude 40'; Storhaug 55'; Carlsen 76' (pen.)

Sportpark Rijsoord, Rijsoord
Attendance: 1,500
Referee: John Walter Lloyd (Wales)

11 December 1988

France	1–2	Italy
Musset 1'	Report (in French); FIGC Report (in Italian)	Marsiletti 69', 71'

Stade des frères Roustan, Vallauris
Attendance: 2,100
Referee: Jose Francisco Conceicao Silva (Portugal)

17 December 1988

West Germany	2–0	Czechoslovakia
Neid 26'; Mohr 55'	DFB Report (in German)

Fritz-Walter-Stadion, Kaiserslautern
Attendance: 2,053
Referee: Charles Gilson (Luxembourg)

Sweden, Norway, Italy and West Germany qualified for the final tournament.
