= Republic of Ireland women's national football team results (1973–1989) =

This article contains the results of the Republic of Ireland women's national football team between 1973 and 1989. In 1973 the Women's Football Association of Ireland was established and the national team made their debut with a 3–2 win in an away game against Wales in the same year. The national team made their competitive debut on 19 September 1982 in a 1984 European Competition for Women's Football qualifier, also against Scotland. This time the Republic of Ireland lost 3–0. On 2 October 1982 the Republic of Ireland gained their first competitive win when they defeated Northern Ireland 2–1 in an away game in the same competition. During the 1980s the Republic of Ireland competed in three further qualifying campaigns – 1987, 1989 and 1991.

== 1970s ==
=== 1973 ===
13 May 1973 Friendly	Wales	2–3	Republic of Ireland	Llanelli, Wales
	Blackwell; Connell	Report	Gorham	Stadium: Stebonheath Park; Referee: Len Howells (Wales)

30 June 1973 Friendly	Republic of Ireland	4–1	Northern Ireland	Dublin, Republic of Ireland
	Stokes 14'; Cummins 38'; Williams	Report	Goal	Stadium: Bluebell United

10 October 1973 Friendly	France	4–0	Republic of Ireland	Paris, France
	Binard 4'; Dewulf 49'; Wolf (?), 51'	Report		Stadium: Parc des Princes

23 October 1973 Friendly	Northern Ireland	1–1	Republic of Ireland	Lurgan, Northern Ireland
				Stadium: Mourneview Park

=== 1974 ===
26 May 1974 Friendly	Republic of Ireland	3–3	Wales	Limerick, Republic of Ireland
	O'Connell; Williams; Elliott	Report		Stadium: Markets Field

=== 1976 ===
18 April 1976 Friendly	Republic of Ireland	3–3	Scotland	Dublin, Republic of Ireland
	Griffin; McHugh	Report		Stadium: Dalymount Park

4 July 1976 Friendly	Scotland	3–1	Republic of Ireland	Grangemouth, Scotland
	Creamer 15'; McLaren 50'; Hunter 75'		Begbie 30' (o.g.)	Attendance: 200

=== 1977 ===
1977 Friendly	Republic of Ireland	6–0	Northern Ireland	Dublin, Republic of Ireland

=== 1978 ===
2 May 1978 Friendly	England	6–1	Republic of Ireland	Exeter, England
	Lopez (?); Foreman (?); Day (?); Dobb (?)		(?)	Stadium: St James Park

13 May 1978 Friendly	Northern Ireland	1–1	Republic of Ireland	Larne, Northern Ireland
	Johnston (pen.)			Stadium: Inver Park

23 September 1978 Friendly	Republic of Ireland	0–0	France	Dublin, Republic of Ireland
				Stadium: Tolka Park

== 1980s ==
=== 1980 ===
14 June 1980 Friendly	Northern Ireland	2–1	Republic of Ireland	Newry, Northern Ireland
				Stadium: Newry Showgrounds

27 October 1980 Friendly	Republic of Ireland	1–0	Belgium	Dublin, Republic of Ireland
		Report		Stadium: Dalymount Park

=== 1981 ===
29 March 1981 Friendly	Republic of Ireland	0–5	Scotland	Dublin, Republic of Ireland
				Stadium: Dalymount Park

2 May 1981 Friendly	Republic of Ireland	0–5	England	Dublin, Republic of Ireland
			Byrne (?); Foreman (?); Reynolds (?); Hutchinson (?)	Stadium: Dalymount Park

8 August 1981 Friendly	Northern Ireland	2–1	Republic of Ireland	Larne, Northern Ireland
				Stadium: Inver Park

17 October 1981 Friendly	Belgium	4–1	Republic of Ireland	Brussels, Belgium
		Report		Stadium: Heysel Stadium

=== 1982 ===
19 September 1982 1984 European Competition for Women's Football qualification	Scotland	3–0	Republic of Ireland	Dunfermline, Scotland
				Stadium: East End Park; Referee: Alan Ferguson (Scotland)

2 October 1982 1984 European Competition for Women's Football qualification	Northern Ireland	1–2	Republic of Ireland	Bangor, Northern Ireland
				Stadium: Clandeboye Park; Referee: Frederick McKnight (Northern Ireland)

7 November 1982 1984 European Competition for Women's Football qualification	Republic of Ireland	0–1	England	Dublin, Republic of Ireland
				Stadium: Dalymount Park; Referee: Patrick Daly (Ireland)

=== 1983 ===
13 March 1983 1984 European Competition for Women's Football qualification	Republic of Ireland	1–1	Scotland	Dublin, Republic of Ireland
				Stadium: Dalymount Park; Referee: John Kinsella (Ireland)

11 September 1983 1984 European Competition for Women's Football qualification	England	6–0	Republic of Ireland	Reading, England
				Stadium: Elm Park; Referee: Alan Robinson (England)

23 October 1983 1984 European Competition for Women's Football qualification	Republic of Ireland	3–2	Northern Ireland	Dublin, Republic of Ireland
				Stadium: Dalymount Park; Referee: ? Gallagher (Ireland)

=== 1984 ===
27 May 1984 Friendly	Scotland	0–1	Republic of Ireland	Glasgow, Scotland

=== 1985 ===
17 April 1985 Friendly	Republic of Ireland	0–4	Denmark	Dublin, Republic of Ireland
		Report	Leth Hansen 37'; Frederiksen 37' ? 49' (o.g.); Gam-Pedersen 56'	Stadium: Glenmalure Park; Attendance: 1,500

5 May 1985 1987 European Competition for Women's Football qualification	Republic of Ireland	1–0	Northern Ireland	Dublin, Republic of Ireland
	Cummins 78'	Report		Stadium: Glenmalure Park

2 June 1985 1987 European Competition for Women's Football qualification	Scotland	2–1	Republic of Ireland	Glasgow, Scotland
	63'; 67'	Report	26'	Stadium: Tinto Park

22 September 1985 1987 European Competition for Women's Football qualification	Republic of Ireland	0–6	England	Cork, Republic of Ireland
		Report	Curl 19', 59', 69'; Powell 24'; Coultard 26'; Sempare 72'	Stadium: Flower Lodge

=== 1986 ===
27 April 1986 1987 European Competition for Women's Football qualification	England	4–0	Republic of Ireland	Reading, England
	Davis 42', 77'; Curl 47'; Law 50'	Report		Stadium: Elm Park

30 August 1986 1987 European Competition for Women's Football qualification	Northern Ireland	0–1	Republic of Ireland	Belfast, Northern Ireland
		Report	43'	Stadium: Seaview

28 September 1986 1987 European Competition for Women's Football qualification	Republic of Ireland	1–5	Scotland	Dublin, Republic of Ireland
	Styles 70'	Report	Marshall 3', 33', 76'; O'Neil 8'; Rice 26'	Stadium: Tolka Park

=== 1987 ===
23 March 1987 Friendly	France	2–0	Republic of Ireland	Caudry, France
	Puentes 19'; Saunier 31'	Report		Attendance: 1,500

28 June 1987 Friendly	Republic of Ireland	0–0	Finland	Dublin, Republic of Ireland
				Stadium: Iveagh Grounds

29 November 1987 1989 European Competition for Women's Football qualification	Republic of Ireland	0–1	Netherlands	Dublin, Republic of Ireland
		Report	de Bakker 38'	Stadium: Dalymount Park; Referee: John Martin (England)

=== 1988 ===
12 March 1988 1989 European Competition for Women's Football qualification	Netherlands	2–0	Republic of Ireland	Delft, Netherlands
	Timisela 30' de Winter 60'	Report		Stadium: Sportpark Brasserskade; Attendance: 1,500; Referee: Frans Van Den Wijngaert (Belgium)

3 April 1988 1989 European Competition for Women's Football qualification	Republic of Ireland	2–1	Scotland	Dublin, Republic of Ireland
				Stadium: Tolka Park; Referee: Denis Mcardle (Ireland)

7 May 1988 1989 European Competition for Women's Football qualification	Republic of Ireland	1–1	Sweden	Dublin, Republic of Ireland
				Stadium: Dalymount Park; Referee: Patrick Kelly (Ireland)

18 September 1988 1989 European Competition for Women's Football qualification	Sweden	4–0	Republic of Ireland	Mariestad, Sweden
				Stadium: Lekevi IP; Referee: Kjell Nordby (Norway)

=== 1989 ===
18 November 1989 UEFA Women's Euro 1991 qualifying	Netherlands	2–0	Republic of Ireland	Koog aan de Zaan, Netherlands
	Vestjens 33' (pen.), 78' (pen.)	Report		Stadium: Hoornseveld; Attendance: 2,000; Referee: Frans Van Den Wijngaert (Belgium)

9 December 1989 UEFA Women's Euro 1991 qualifying	Northern Ireland	1–2	Republic of Ireland	Bangor, Northern Ireland
	O'Neill 42'	Report	Reynolds 43', 78'	Stadium: Clandeboye Park; Referee: Douglas Diarmid Hope (Scotland)
