= UEFA Women's Euro 1991 qualifying =

Football tournament qualification stage

The qualification for the UEFA Women's Euro 1991 was held between 9 September 1989 & 12 December 1990. Quarter finals winners qualified for the final tournament. The tournament also served as qualifiers for the inaugural FIFA Women's World Cup, with the four quarter finals winners and the best quarter finals loser qualifying for China 1991.

== Group stage ==
=== Group 1 ===
Team	GP	W	D	L	GF	GA	Pts
Netherlands	4	3	1	0	17	0	7
Republic of Ireland	4	2	1	1	6	3	5
Northern Ireland	4	0	0	4	1	21	0

18 November 1989
15:00

Netherlands	2–0	Republic of Ireland
Vestjens 33' (pen.), 78' (pen.)	KNVB Report (in Dutch); FAI Report

Hoornseveld, Koog aan de Zaan
Attendance: 2,000
Referee: Frans Van Den Wijngaert (Belgium)

9 December 1989
14:30

Northern Ireland	1–2	Republic of Ireland
O'Neill 42'	FAI Report	Reynolds 43', 78'

Clandeboye Park, Bangor
Referee: Douglas Diarmid Hope (Scotland)

19 March 1990

Northern Ireland	0–6	Netherlands
	KNVB Report (in Dutch)	de Bakker 5', 13'; Pauw 26'; Limbeek 28'; Timisela 29', 72'

Solitude, Belfast
Attendance: 100
Referee: Frederick Mcknight (Northern Ireland)

29 April 1990
15:00

Republic of Ireland	0–0	Netherlands
	FAI Report; KNVB Report (in Dutch)

Dalymount Park, Dublin
Referee: Patrick Kelly (Ireland)

22 September 1990

Netherlands	9–0	Northern Ireland
de Bakker 1', 2', 46', 49'; Geeris 3'; Limbeek 47' van Waarden 48'; Baal 50'; Vestjens 51'	KNVB Report (in Dutch)

Eikendijk, Kaatsheuvel
Attendance: 1,500
Referee: Erny Kesseler (Luxembourg)

7 October 1990
14:30

Republic of Ireland	4–0	Northern Ireland
Scanlan 2', 43'; Cross 5'; Williams 45'	FAI Report

Belfield Park, Dublin
Referee: Wilfred Wallace (Ireland)

=== Group 2 ===
Team	GP	W	D	L	GF	GA	Pts
Sweden	4	4	0	0	12	2	8
France	4	2	0	2	6	7	4
Poland	4	0	0	4	2	11	0

15 October 1989

Poland	1–3	France
Makowska 59' (pen.)	Report (in French)	Musset 19'; Jézéquel 38'; Mismacq 49'

Knurów
Attendance: 5,000
Referee: Robert Matusik (Czech Republic)

22 October 1989

Sweden	4–1	Poland
Fahlström; Karlsson; Carlsson; Videkull	SvFF Report (in Swedish)	Gospodazyk

Olympia, Helsingborg
Attendance: 394
Referee: Kim Milton Nielsen (Denmark)

13 May 1990

France	0–2	Sweden
	Report (in French); SvFF Report (in Swedish)	Sundhage 60' (pen.), 67'

Stade Municipal, Melun
Attendance: 2,500
Referee: Erny Kesseler (Luxembourg)

10 June 1990

Poland	0–2	Sweden
	SvFF Report (in Swedish)	Videkull; Sundhage

Stadium OSiR, Gorzów
Attendance: 500
Referee: Eero Aho (Finland)

29 September 1990

France	2–0	Poland
Le Boulch 16'; Mismacq 19'	Report (in French)

Creutzwald, Metz
Attendance: 1,300
Referee: Hans-Peter Dellwing (Germany)

14 October 1990

Sweden	4–1	France
Stålklint 19'; Videkull 38'; Fahlström 48'; Sundhage 79'	Report (in French); SvFF Report (in Swedish)	Jézéquel 75'

Lekevi IP, Mariestad
Attendance: 3,453
Referee: John Pallesgaard Nielsen (Denmark)

=== Group 3 ===
Team	GP	W	D	L	GF	GA	Pts
Norway	6	5	1	0	12	0	11
England	6	2	3	1	4	2	7
Finland	6	1	2	3	3	6	4
Belgium	6	1	0	5	1	12	2

9 September 1989

Finland	0–1	Norway
	NFF Report (in Norwegian)	Grude 27' (pen.)

Varkauden Keskuskenttä, Varkaus
Attendance: 749
Referee: B. Svensson (Sweden)

1 October 1989

England	0–0	Finland

Griffin Park, Brentford
Attendance: 2,083
Referee: Leslie Irvine (Northern Ireland)

15 October 1989
13:30

Norway	4–0	Belgium
Haugen 32'; Strædet 43', 76'; Støre 45'	NFF Report (in Norwegian); KBVB Report (in Dutch)

Gjemselund Stadion, Kongsvinger
Attendance: 1,200
Referee: Ulf Eriksson (Sweden)

17 March 1990
15:00

Belgium	0–3	England
	KBVB Report (in Dutch)	Powell 32', 39'; Sempare 66'

Het Minneplein, Ypres
Referee: Hans-Peter Dellwing (Germany)

7 April 1990
19:30

England	1–0	Belgium
Coultard 63'	KBVB Report (in Dutch)

Bramall Lane, Sheffield
Referee: Eyjolfur Olafsson (Iceland)

12 May 1990
13:00

Finland	3–0	Belgium
Toikka 8'; Rautiainen 20' (pen.); Ojala 69'	KBVB Report (in Dutch)

Tapiolan Urheilupuisto, Espoo
Attendance: 400
Referee: Ryszard Wojcik (Poland)

27 May 1990

Norway	2–0	England
Medalen 51'; Haugen 76'	NFF Report (in Norwegian)

Klepp Stadion, Kleppe
Attendance: 604
Referee: Kaj Østergaard (Denmark)

13 June 1990

Norway	4–0	Finland
Hegstad 1'; Carlsen 60'; Støre 61', 75'	NFF Report (in Norwegian)

Kjølnes Stadion, Porsgrunn
Attendance: 600
Referee: Andrew Wilson Waddell (Scotland)

2 September 1990

England	0–0	Norway
	NFF Report (in Norwegian)

Old Trafford, Manchester
Attendance: 435
Referee: Johannes Reijgwaart (Netherlands)

27 September 1990
17:00

Belgium	0–1	Norway
	NFF Report (in Norwegian); KBVB Report (in Dutch)	Zaborowski 34'

Stadion Jos Van Wellen, Kapellen
Attendance: 200
Referee: Alain Delmer (France)

29 September 1990

Finland	0–0	England

Tampere
Referee: Klaus Scheurell (Germany)

13 October 1990
14:00

Belgium	1–0	Finland
Van Laethem 52'	KBVB Report (in Dutch)

Stade Joseph Marien, Brussels
Referee: Karl-Josef Assenmacher (Germany)

=== Group 4 ===
Team	GP	W	D	L	GF	GA	Pts
Germany	6	5	1	0	18	1	11
Hungary	6	3	1	2	7	7	7
Czechoslovakia	6	3	0	3	8	10	6
Bulgaria	6	0	0	6	3	18	0

1 October 1989

West Germany	0–0	Hungary
	DFB Report (in German)

Straubing Stadium, Straubing

14 October 1989

Czechoslovakia	2–0	Bulgaria
Buliřová 3', 73'	Report (in Czech)

Skuteč
Attendance: 1,000
Referee: Ziler (West Germany)

28 October 1989

Bulgaria	0–3	Hungary

Bulgaria

22 November 1989

West Germany	5–0	Czechoslovakia
Unsleber 14'; Mohr 34', 75'; Bindl 35'; Neid 46'	DFB Report (in German)

Georg-Gaßmann-Stadion, Marburg

11 April 1990

Bulgaria	1–4	West Germany
Georgieva 69'	DFB Report (in German)	Lohn 9'; Mohr 39'; Damm 67'; Unsleber 88'

Georgi Asparuhov Stadium, Sofia

29 April 1990

Czechoslovakia	0–1	West Germany
	DFB Report (in German)	Nardenbach 46'

Stovky, Frýdek-Místek

26 May 1990

Hungary	2–0	Czechoslovakia

Hungary

9 June 1990

Hungary	2–0	Bulgaria

Hungary

26 September 1990

West Germany	4–0	Bulgaria
Unsleber 18'; Neid 46', 52'; Mohr 76'	DFB Report (in German)

Rheinstadion, Düsseldorf

29 September 1990

Czechoslovakia	3–0	Hungary
Haniaková 32'; Paolettiová 60'; Minksová 74'	Report (in Slovak)

Czechoslovakia
Attendance: 2000
Referee: Chuasinov

14 October 1990

Hungary	0–4	Germany
	DFB Report (in German)	Unsleber 4'; Voss 27'; Lohn 32'; Wiegmann 44' (pen.)

Sopron Stadion, Sopron

14 October 1990

Bulgaria	2–3	Czechoslovakia
	Report (in Slovak)	Zuzaníková 63'; Hanáková 76'; Jedličková 78'

Bulgaria

=== Group 5 ===
Team	GP	W	D	L	GF	GA	Pts
Denmark	6	5	1	0	18	2	11
Italy	6	3	2	1	12	4	8
Switzerland	6	1	1	4	3	17	3
Spain	6	0	2	4	3	13	2

14 October 1989
14:45

Switzerland	0–4	Denmark
	DBU Report (in Danish); ASF-SFV Report (in German)	H. Jensen 25', 63'; Obel 71'; Nissen 73'

Wankdorfstadion, Bern
Attendance: 500
Referee: Pierluigi Pairetto (Italy)
Match info

4 November 1989
16:15

Spain	0–0	Switzerland
	ASF-SFV Report (in German)

Farcha, Benicàssim
Attendance: 2,500
Referee: Claude Bouillet (France)
Match info

25 November 1989

Spain	1–3	Denmark
?? 11'	DBU Report (in Danish)	Rotbøll 40'; H. Jensen 60'; J. Hansen 77'

Estadio El Maulí, Antequera

2 December 1989

Italy	4–1	Switzerland
Morace 20'; Carta 37'; Mariotti 41'; Baldelli 50'	FIGC Report (in Italian); ASF-SFV Report (in German)	Spinner 78'

Stadio Mirabello, Reggio Emilia
Attendance: 10,000
Referee: Gerhard Kapl (Austria)
Match info

10 February 1990

Italy	3–1	Spain
Ferraguzzi 32'; Morace 53', 73'	FIGC Report (in Italian)	Artola 81'

Stadio San Ciro, Portici
Referee: Mateo Beušan (Yugoslavia)

7 April 1990
15:00

Switzerland	0–4	Italy
	FIGC Report (in Italian); ASF-SFV Report (in German)	Morace 23', 35'; Marsiletti 43'; Saldi 64'

Stadio Cornaredo, Lugano
Attendance: 500
Referee: Jozef Chocholous (Czechoslovakia)
Match info

28 April 1990
15:00

Denmark	1–0	Italy
H. Jensen 40'	DBU Report (in Danish); FIGC Report (in Italian)

Vejle Stadion, Vejle
Attendance: 400
Referee: Egil Nervik (Norway)

2 May 1990
19:30

Switzerland	2–1	Spain
L. Käser 26'; Gubler 44'	ASF-SFV Report (in German)	Á. Jiménez 75'

Spiegelfeld, Binningen
Attendance: 600
Referee: Jean-François Crucke (Belgium)
Match info

23 May 1990
19:00

Denmark	4–0	Switzerland
H. Jensen 4', 11'; Rotbøll 67'; Thychosen 79'	DBU Report (in Danish); ASF-SFV Report (in German)

Vejle Stadion, Vejle
Attendance: 300
Referee: Bernd Heynemann (Germany)
Match info

13 June 1990
14:30

Denmark	5–0	Spain
H. Jensen 12', 50'; Rotbøll 15'; Gam-Pedersen 74'; Kolding 80'	DBU Report (in Danish)

Vejle Stadion, Vejle
Attendance: 150
Referee: K. Burge (Scotland)

6 October 1990

Italy	1–1	Denmark
Ferraguzzi 51' (pen.)	DBU Report (in Danish); FIGC Report (in Italian)	Bagge 12'

Stadio Comunale di Oristano, Oristano
Attendance: 700
Referee: Besnik Kaimi (Albania)

21 October 1990

Spain	0–0	Italy
	FIGC Report (in Italian)

Estadio Cartagonova, Cartagena
Referee: Azevedo (Portugal)

== Quarter finals ==
=== First leg ===
14 November 1990

Norway	2–1	Hungary
Riise 65'; Stenberg 74'	NFF Report (in Norwegian) report	Kern 80'

Kristiansand Stadion, Kristiansand
Attendance: 808
Referee: Michał Listkiewicz (Poland)

18 November 1990

Sweden	1–1	Italy
Sundhage 19'	SvFF Report (in Swedish); FIGC Report (in Italian); Report	Carta 43'

Malmö Stadion, Malmö
Attendance: 450
Referee: Klaus Peschel (Germany)

24 November 1990

Denmark	0–0	Netherlands
	KNVB Report (in Dutch); DBU Report (in Danish); Report

Vejle Stadion, Vejle
Attendance: 250
Referee: Rodger Gifford (Wales)

25 November 1990

England	1–4	Germany
K. Walker 28'	DFB Report (in German); Report	Mohr 18', 37', 54'; Lohn 34'

Adams Park, Wycombe
Attendance: 2,000
Referee: Jaap Uilenberg (Netherlands)

=== Second leg ===
25 November 1990

Hungary	0–2	Norway
	NFF Report (in Norwegian); Report	Bakken 20'; Haugen 75'

Promontor utcai Stadion, Budapest
Attendance: 400
Referee: Karl-Josef Assenmacher (Germany)

Norway won 4–1 on aggregate.

8 December 1990

Italy	0–0	Sweden
	SvFF Report (in Swedish); FIGC Report (in Italian); Report

Stadio Romeo Menti, Castellammare di Stabia
Attendance: 4,000
Referee: Guy Goethals (Belgium)

Italy won 1–1 on away goals.

8 December 1990

Netherlands	0–1 (a.e.t.)	Denmark
	KNVB Report (in Dutch); DBU Report (in Danish); Report	Rotbøll 95'

Sportpark De Molendijk, Denekamp
Attendance: 3,500
Referee: Andrew Waddell (Scotland)

Denmark won 1–0 on aggregate.

16 December 1990

Germany	2–0	England
Unsleber 24', 80'	DFB Report (in German); Report

Ruhrstadion, Bochum
Attendance: 3,051
Referee: Michel Girard (France)

Germany won 6–1 on aggregate.

Norway, Italy, Denmark and Germany qualified for the final tournament.
Norway, Italy, Denmark, Germany and Sweden qualified for the 1991 FIFA Women's World Cup.
