= Scotland at the UEFA Women's Championship =

Scotland UEFA Women's

Scotland have participated 1 times at the UEFA Women's Championship. The best achievement is the group stage.

== UEFA Women's Championship ==
Year	Final Tournament							Qualification								
Year	Round	Pld	W	D	L	F	A	Round	Pld	W	D	L	F	A	P/R	Rnk
1984	Did not qualify							Group – 2nd	6	3	1	2	9	8	–	
(Norway) 1987	Did not qualify							Group – 2nd	6	4	0	2	24	10	–	
(West Germany) 1989	Did not qualify							Group – 4th	Withdrew							
(Denmark) 1991	Did not enter							Did not enter								
(Italy) 1993	Did not qualify							Group – 3rd	4	0	1	3	1	5	–	
1995	Did not qualify							Group – 4th	6	0	0	6	3	22	–	
(Norway) / (Sweden) 1997	Unable to qualify (Note: Scotland were in "Class B" of European qualification and were therefore unable to earn qualification for the European Championship finals.)							Unable to qualify								
(Germany) 2001	Unable to qualify							Unable to qualify								
(England) 2005	Did not qualify							Group – 3rd	8	4	0	4	19		–	
(Finland) 2009	Did not qualify							Play-offs	10	4	1	5	19	11	–	
(Sweden) 2013	Did not qualify							Play-offs	10	5	2	3	24	16	–	
(Netherlands) 2017	Group – 3rd	3	1	0	2	2	8	Group – 2nd	8	7	0	1	30	7	–	
(England) 2022	Did not qualify							Group E	8	4	0	4	26	5	–	
(Switzerland) 2025	Did not qualify							Play-offs	10	7	2	1	18	3	▲ (Note: From Euro 2025 onwards a new qualifying format was introduced, linked to the Women's Nations League where teams are divided into leagues with promotion/relegation between the leagues at the end of each cycle.)	18th
(Germany) 2029	To be determined															
Totals	1/14	3	1	0	2	2	8	Totals	76	38	7	31	173	103	18th	

UEFA Women's Championship history
Year	Round	Date	Opponent	Result	Stadium
(Netherlands) 2017	Group stage	19 July	England	L 0–6	Stadion Galgenwaard, Utrecht
(Netherlands) 2017	Group stage	23 July	Portugal	L 1–2	Sparta Stadion, Rotterdam
(Netherlands) 2017	Group stage	27 July	Spain	W 1–0	De Adelaarshorst, Deventer

== Head-to-head record ==
Opponent	Pld	W	D	L	GF	GA	GD	Win %
England	1	0	0	1	0	6	−6	0.00
Portugal	1	0	0	1	1	2	−1	0.00
Spain	1	1	0	0	1	0	+1	100.00
Total	3	1	0	2	2	8	−6	33.33
