= 1989–90 in West German football =

Football in Germany
- Season: 1989–90

Men's football
- Bundesliga: Bayern Munich
- 2. Bundesliga: Hertha BSC
- DFB-Pokal: 1. FC Kaiserslautern
- DFB-Supercup: Borussia Dortmund

Women's football
- Champions: TSV Siegen
- DFB-Pokal: FSV Frankfurt

The 1989–90 season is the 80th season of competitive football in Germany.

== National teams ==
=== West Germany national football team ===
==== 1990 FIFA World Cup qualification ====
4 October 1989	West Germany	6–1	Finland	Dortmund
	Möller 12', 80'; Littbarski 47'; Klinsmann 53'; Völler 62'; Matthäus 84' (pen.)	DFB; Report	Lipponen 72'	Stadium: Westfalenstadion; Attendance: 40,000; Referee: Alan Snoddy (Northern Ireland)

15 November 1989	West Germany	2–1	Wales	Cologne
	Völler 25'; Häßler 48'	DFB; Report	Allen 11'	Stadium: Müngersdorfer Stadion; Attendance: 60,300; Referee: Michel Vautrot (France)

==== 1990 FIFA World Cup ====
10 June 1990 Group D	West Germany	4–1	Yugoslavia	Milan, Italy
21:00	Matthäus 28', 64'; Klinsmann 39'; Völler 70'	FIFA	Jozić 55'	Stadium: San Siro; Attendance: 74,765; Referee: Peter Mikkelsen (Denmark)

15 June 1990 Group D	West Germany	5–1	United Arab Emirates	Milan, Italy
21:00	Völler 35', 75'; Klinsmann 37'; Matthäus 47'; Bein 58'	Report	Ismaïl 46'	Stadium: San Siro; Attendance: 71,169; Referee: Alexey Spirin (Soviet Union)

19 June 1990 Group D	West Germany	1–1	Colombia	Milan, Italy
17:00	Littbarski 89'	Report	Rincón 90+3'	Stadium: San Siro; Attendance: 72,510; Referee: Alan Snoddy (Northern Ireland)

24 June 1990 Round of 16	West Germany	2–1	Netherlands	Milan, Italy
21:00	Klinsmann 51'; Brehme 82'	Report	R. Koeman 89' (pen.)	Stadium: San Siro; Attendance: 74,559; Referee: Juan Carlos Loustau (Argentina)

1 July 1990 Quarter-finals	West Germany	1–0	Czechoslovakia	Milan, Italy
17:00	Matthäus 25' (pen.)	Report		Stadium: San Siro; Attendance: 73,347; Referee: Helmut Kohl (Austria)

4 July 1990 Semi-finals	West Germany	1–1 (a.e.t.) (4–3 p)	England	Turin, Italy
20:00	Brehme 60'	Report	Lineker 80'	Stadium: Stadio delle Alpi; Attendance: 62,628; Referee: José Roberto Wright (Brazil)
	Penalties
	Brehme (penalty scored); Matthäus (penalty scored); Riedle (penalty scored); Thon (penalty scored)		(penalty scored) Lineker; (penalty scored) Beardsley; (penalty scored) Platt; (penalty missed) Pearce; (penalty missed) Waddle

8 July 1990 Final	West Germany	1–0	Argentina	Rome, Italy
20:00	Brehme 85' (pen.)	Report		Stadium: Stadio Olimpico; Attendance: 73,603; Referee: Edgardo Codesal (Mexico)

==== Friendly matches ====
6 September 1989	Republic of Ireland	1–1	West Germany	Dublin, Ireland
	Stapleton 10'	DFB; Report	Dorfner 33'	Stadium: Lansdowne Road; Attendance: 47,000; Referee: Frans van den Wijngaert (Belgium)

28 February 1990	France	2–1	West Germany	Montpellier, France
	Papin 43'; Cantona 82'	DFB; Report	Möller 36'	Stadium: Stade de la Mosson; Attendance: 22,000; Referee: Joaquín Ramos Marcos (Spain)

25 April 1990	West Germany	3–3	Uruguay	Stuttgart
	Matthäus 60'; Völler 64'; Klinsmann 75'	DFB; Report	Aguilera 49'; Ostolaza 73'; Revelez 78'	Stadium: Neckarstadion; Attendance: 35,000; Referee: Bo Karlsson (Sweden)

26 May 1990	West Germany	1–0	Czechoslovakia	Düsseldorf
	Bein 24'	DFB; Report		Stadium: Rheinstadion; Attendance: 26,000; Referee: Bruno Galler (Switzerland)

30 May 1990	West Germany	1–0	Denmark	Gelsenkirchen
	Völler 35'	DFB; Report		Stadium: Parkstadion; Attendance: 42,000; Referee: Neil Midgley (England)

=== West Germany women's national football team ===
==== Women's Euro 1991 qualification ====
1 October 1989	West Germany	0–0	Hungary	Straubing
		DFB		Attendance: 3,400; Referee: Arturo Martino (Switzerland)

22 November 1989	West Germany	5–0	Czechoslovakia	Marburg
	Unsleber 14'; Mohr 34', 75'; Bindl 35'; Neid 46'	DFB		Attendance: 3,200; Referee: Steindl (Austria)

11 April 1990	Bulgaria	1–4	West Germany	Sofia, Bulgaria
	Georgieva 69'	DFB	Lohn 9'; Mohr 39'; Damm 67'; Unsleber 88'	Attendance: 500; Referee: Constantin (Romania)

29 April 1990	Czechoslovakia	0–1	West Germany	Frýdek-Místek, Czechoslovakia
		DFB	Nardenbach 46'	Referee: Michel Pireaux (Belgium)

== League season ==
=== Bundesliga ===
Pos	Team	Pld	W	D	L	GF	GA	GD	Pts	Qualification or relegation
1	Bayern Munich (C)	34	19	11	4	64	28	+36	49	Qualification to European Cup first round
2	1. FC Köln	34	17	9	8	54	44	+10	43	Qualification to UEFA Cup first round
3	Eintracht Frankfurt	34	15	11	8	61	40	+21	41	Qualification to UEFA Cup first round
4	Borussia Dortmund	34	15	11	8	51	35	+16	41	Qualification to UEFA Cup first round
5	Bayer Leverkusen	34	12	15	7	40	32	+8	39	Qualification to UEFA Cup first round
6	VfB Stuttgart	34	15	6	13	53	47	+6	36	
7	Werder Bremen	34	10	14	10	49	41	+8	34	
8	1. FC Nürnberg	34	11	11	12	42	46	−4	33	
9	Fortuna Düsseldorf	34	10	12	12	41	41	0	32	
10	Karlsruher SC	34	10	12	12	32	39	−7	32	
11	Hamburger SV	34	13	5	16	39	46	−7	31	
12	1. FC Kaiserslautern	34	10	11	13	42	55	−13	31	Qualification to Cup Winners' Cup first round
13	FC St. Pauli	34	9	13	12	31	46	−15	31	
14	Bayer 05 Uerdingen	34	10	10	14	41	48	−7	30	
15	Borussia Mönchengladbach	34	11	8	15	37	45	−8	30	
16	VfL Bochum (O)	34	11	7	16	44	53	−9	29	Qualification to relegation play-offs
17	Waldhof Mannheim (R)	34	10	6	18	36	53	−17	26	Relegation to 2. Bundesliga
18	FC 08 Homburg (R)	34	8	8	18	33	51	−18	24	Relegation to 2. Bundesliga

Source: www.dfb.de
Rules for classification: 1) points; 2) goal difference; 3) number of goals scored.
(C) Champions; (O) Play-off winners; (R) Relegated

=== 2. Bundesliga ===
Pos	Team	Pld	W	D	L	GF	GA	GD	Pts	Promotion, qualification or relegation
1	Hertha BSC (C, P)	38	22	9	7	65	39	+26	53	Promotion to Bundesliga
2	SG Wattenscheid 09 (P)	38	21	9	8	70	35	+35	51	Promotion to Bundesliga
3	1. FC Saarbrücken	38	15	16	7	58	33	+25	46	Qualification to promotion play-offs
4	Stuttgarter Kickers	38	19	7	12	68	48	+20	45	
5	Schalke 04	38	16	11	11	69	51	+18	43	
6	Rot-Weiss Essen	38	15	12	11	53	43	+10	42	
7	Eintracht Braunschweig	38	15	9	14	55	51	+4	39	
8	Hannover 96	38	12	14	12	53	43	+10	38	
9	Blau-Weiß 90 Berlin	38	12	13	13	46	52	−6	37	
10	MSV Duisburg	38	11	15	12	50	58	−8	37	
11	SV Meppen	38	10	16	12	47	57	−10	36	
12	SC Preußen Münster	38	13	10	15	45	65	−20	36	
13	SC Freiburg	38	11	12	15	53	52	+1	34	
14	Fortuna Köln	38	9	16	13	48	60	−12	34	
15	VfL Osnabrück	38	12	9	17	58	69	−11	33	
16	SV Darmstadt 98	38	10	13	15	43	55	−12	33	
17	Hessen Kassel (R)	38	13	7	18	35	64	−29	33	Relegation to Oberliga
18	SpVgg Bayreuth (R)	38	11	9	18	54	59	−5	31	Relegation to Oberliga
19	Alemannia Aachen (R)	38	11	8	19	51	63	−12	30	Relegation to Oberliga
20	SpVgg Unterhaching (R)	38	7	15	16	43	61	−18	29	Relegation to Oberliga

Source: kicker.de
Rules for classification: 1) points; 2) goal difference; 3) number of goals scored.
(C) Champions; (P) Promoted; (R) Relegated
