= UEFA Women's Euro 1993 qualifying =

Football tournament qualification stage

The qualification for the UEFA Women's Euro 1993 took place between 21 September 1991 & 14 November 1992. The winners of the quarter-finals advanced to the tournament.

== First round ==
=== Group 1 ===
Team	GP	W	D	L	GF	GA	Pts
Norway	4	3	1	0	24	0	7
Belgium	4	1	2	1	1	8	4
Switzerland	4	0	1	3	0	17	1

29 September 1991

Switzerland	0–10	Norway
	NFF Report (in Norwegian)	Medalen 33', 55', 57', 79'; Carlsen 41', 58'; Hegstad 44', 73'; Stenberg 60'; Haugen 80'

Stadion Brügglifeld, Aarau
Attendance: 700
Referee: Grapher

16 November 1991
17:30

Belgium	0–0	Switzerland
	KBVB Report (in Dutch)

De Leunen, Geel
Referee: John Purcell (Ireland)

11 April 1992
17:00

Switzerland	0–1	Belgium
	KBVB Report (in Dutch)	Vanslembrouck 56'

Pfäffikon, Switzerland
Referee: René Bindels (Luxembourg)

12 May 1992
19:30

Belgium	0–0	Norway
	NFF Report (in Norwegian); KBVB Report (in Dutch)

Pierre Cornelis Stadion, Aalst
Attendance: 600
Referee: Keith Cooper (Wales)

23 May 1992

Norway	6–0	Switzerland
Carlsen 16'; Krokan 47'; Nyborg 50'; Svensson 52'; Riise 71'; Aarønes 80'	NFF Report (in Norwegian)

Rolighetsmoen, Modum
Attendance: 910
Referee: Orrason

26 September 1992
16:00

Norway	8–0	Belgium
Aarønes 9', 44'; Carlsen 26'; Hegstad 40'; Krokan 42'; Riise 47', 75'; Nyborg 72'	NFF Report (in Norwegian); KBVB Report (in Dutch)

Sofiemyr Stadion, Kolbotn
Attendance: 1,400
Referee: John Nielsen (Denmark)

=== Group 2 ===
Team	GP	W	D	L	GF	GA	Pts
Denmark	4	3	1	0	14	2	7
France	4	1	1	2	7	10	3
Finland	4	0	2	2	3	12	2

21 September 1991

Finland	1–1	Denmark
Kuosmanen 26'	DBU Report (in Danish)	H. Jensen 34'

Tampere Stadium, Tampere
Attendance: 300
Referee: Christer Fällström (Sweden)

16 October 1991
19:00

Denmark	4–1	France
J. Hansen 2'; H. Jensen 16'; Thychosen 46' (pen.), 51'	Report (in French); DBU Report (in Danish)	Jézéquel 90'

Aalborg Stadion, Aalborg
Attendance: 300
Referee: Hans-Jürgen Weber (Germany)

2 May 1992

France	0–4	Denmark
	Report (in French); DBU Report (in Danish)	C. Nielsen 9'; Mackensie 20'; H. Jensen 49'; Nissen 60'

Stade de Penvillers, Quimper
Referee: Eric Blareau (Belgium)

9 May 1992

Finland	1–1	France
Auveri 17'	Report (in French)	Bernauer 46'

Veritas Stadion, Turku
Attendance: 100
Referee: Elofsson (Sweden)

17 May 1992
13:00

Denmark	5–0	Finland
C. Nielsen 6', 38'; Nissen 12', 76'; Mackensie 24' (pen.)	DBU Report (in Danish)

Hjørring Stadion, Hjørring
Attendance: 905
Referee: Nemus Djurhuus (Faroe Islands)

27 September 1992

France	5–1	Finland
Fusier 10', 72'; Petit 40'; Ticarzot 65'; Locatelli 70'	Report (in French)	Toikka 36'

Stadium Municipal d'Albi, Albi
Attendance: 800
Referee: Mendes Pratas (Portugal)

=== Group 3 ===
Team	GP	W	D	L	GF	GA	Pts
England	4	4	0	0	9	1	8
Iceland	4	1	1	2	3	7	3
Scotland	4	0	1	3	1	5	1

18 April 1992

England	1–0	Scotland

England

17 May 1992

England	4–0	Iceland
	KSÍ Report (in Icelandic)

Huish Park, Yeovil

20 May 1992

Scotland	0–0	Iceland
	KSÍ Report (in Icelandic)

McDiarmid Park, Perth

22 June 1992

Iceland	2–1	Scotland
Gylfadóttir 16'; Gunnlaugsdóttir 21'	KSÍ Report (in Icelandic)	?? 77'

Akranesvöllur, Akranes

19 July 1992

Iceland	1–2	England
Stefánsdóttir 60'	KSÍ Report (in Icelandic)	Walker 13'; Borman 77'

Kópavogsvöllur, Kópavogur

23 August 1992

Scotland	0–2	England

Scotland

=== Group 4 ===
Team	GP	W	D	L	GF	GA	Pts
Sweden	4	3	1	0	16	1	7
Spain	4	1	1	2	2	6	3
Republic of Ireland	4	1	0	3	1	12	2

23 October 1991

Spain	0–4	Sweden
	SvFF Report (in Swedish)	Videkull; Sundhage; Andelén; I. Johansson

Estadio La Balastera, Palencia
Attendance: 500

8 December 1991
14:00

Spain	0–1	Republic of Ireland
	FAI Report	O'Toole 51'

Ciudad Deportiva de Lucena, Lucena
Referee: Philippe Leduc (France)

22 March 1992

Republic of Ireland	0–1	Spain
	FAI Report	Bakero 9'

Dalymount Park, Dublin
Referee: Bragi Bergmann

17 May 1992

Sweden	1–1	Spain
H. Johansson	SvFF Report (in Swedish)	Prieto

Ryavallen, Borås
Attendance: 454

7 June 1992
15:00

Republic of Ireland	0–1	Sweden
	FAI Report; SvFF Report (in Swedish)	Andelén 83'

Dalymount Park, Dublin
Attendance: 700
Referee: Stephen Lodge (England)

20 September 1992
15:00

Sweden	10–0	Republic of Ireland
Kalte 28'; Andersson 30', 67'; Andelén 42', 53', 70', 73'; Videkull 51', 64'; Nilsson 80'	FAI Report; SvFF Report (in Swedish)

Ryavallen, Borås
Attendance: 606
Referee: Zygmunt Ziober

=== Group 5 ===
Team	GP	W	D	L	GF	GA	Pts
Netherlands	4	2	2	0	6	1	6
Romania	4	1	3	0	2	1	5
Greece	4	0	1	3	0	6	1

10 November 1991

Greece	0–0	Romania

Greece

8 March 1992

Greece	0–3	Netherlands
	KNVB Report (in Dutch)	Timisela 1'; Geeris 2'; Limbeek 46'

Komotini Municipal Stadium, Komotini
Referee: Arie Frost (Israel)

4 April 1992

Netherlands	2–0	Greece
Geeris 34' (pen.), 73'	KNVB Report (in Dutch)

Sportpark Het Valkennest, Valkenswaard
Referee: Styrbjörn Oskarsson (Finland)

17 May 1992

Romania	1–0	Greece

Romania

3 June 1992

Netherlands	1–1	Romania
van der Ploeg 1'	KNVB Report (in Dutch)	??? 46'

Sportpark De Peppel, Drachten
Referee: Leslie Irvine (Northern Ireland)

23 September 1992

Romania	0–0	Netherlands
	KNVB Report (in Dutch)

Stadionul Silviu Ploeșteanu, Brașov
Referee: Vesselin Bogdanov (Bulgaria)

=== Group 6 ===
Team	GP	W	D	L	GF	GA	Pts
Germany	1	1	0	0	3	0	2
FR Yugoslavia	1	0	0	1	0	3	0

28 May 1992

FR Yugoslavia	0–3	Germany
	DFB Report (in German)	Unsleber 22'; Hengst 53'; Mohr 73'

Georgi Asparuhov Stadium, Sofia (Bulgaria)

28 June 1992

Germany	n / p	FR Yugoslavia

Germany

Due to political instability and war unrest in Yugoslavia, the first leg was played in Bulgaria and the second leg was not played.

=== Group 7 ===
Team	GP	W	D	L	GF	GA	Pts
Italy	4	3	1	0	12	4	7
Czechoslovakia	4	2	1	1	7	6	5
Poland	4	0	0	4	3	12	0

29 September 1991

Poland	1–2	Czechoslovakia

Poland

19 October 1991

Italy	3–1	Poland
Morace 5'; Fiorini 55'; Marsiletti 60'	FIGC Report (in Italian)	Mikołajczyk 23'

Stadio Francesco Pallozzi, Sulmona
Referee: Babarogio (Yugoslavia)

30 May 1992
14:30

Czechoslovakia	0–3	Italy
	FIGC Report (in Italian)	Fiorini 4' (pen.); Morace 33', 79'

Mestský štadión, Púchov
Referee: Nikolai Levnikov (Russia)

28 June 1992

Czechoslovakia	3–0	Poland

Czechoslovakia

12 September 1992
15:30

Italy	2–2	Czechoslovakia
Tlachová 14' (o.g.); Marsiletti 54'	FIGC Report (in Italian)	Bulínová 59' (pen.); Chlumecká 75'

Stadio Armando Picchi, Jesolo
Referee: Raul Garcia de Loza (Spain)

27 September 1992
14:30

Poland	1–4	Italy
Jendryczko 50'	FIGC Report (in Italian)	Morace 26', 75'; D'Astolfo 29'; Marsiletti 37'

Stadion WKS Wawel, Kraków
Referee: Zeller (Germany)

=== Group 8 ===
Team	GP	W	D	L	GF	GA	Pts
Russia	4	3	1	0	7	2	7
Hungary	4	2	1	1	5	2	5
Bulgaria	4	0	0	4	1	9	0

6 October 1991

Soviet Union	2–1	Hungary

USSR

27 October 1991

Bulgaria	0–1	Hungary

Bulgaria

17 May 1992

Hungary	0–0	Russia

Hungary

31 May 1992

Hungary	3–0	Bulgaria

Hungary

30 June 1992

Russia	3–0	Bulgaria

Russia

27 September 1992

Bulgaria	1–2	Russia

Bulgaria

== Second round ==
=== First leg ===
10 October 1992
12:00

Norway	3–0	Netherlands
Hegstad 50'; Riise 53'; Krokan 61'	KNVB Report (in Dutch); NFF Report (in Norwegian); Report

Ullevaal Stadion, Oslo
Attendance: 695
Referee: Nemus Djurhuus (Faroe Islands)

11 October 1992

Russia	0–7	Germany
	DFB Report (in German); Report	Voss 5', 17'; Neid 16'; Unsleber 19', 79'; Grigoli 42'; Mohr 71'

Eduard Streltsov Stadium, Moscow
Attendance: 500
Referee: Daniel Roduit (Switzerland)

13 October 1992
19:00

Sweden	1–2	Denmark
Andelén 10'	DBU Report (in Danish); SvFF Report (in Swedish); Report	Rasmussen 14'; M. Jensen 78'

Ryavallen, Borås
Attendance: 393
Referee: Wojciech Rudy (Poland)

17 October 1992
14:00

Italy	3–2	England
Morace 37', 43'; Fiorini 54'	FIGC Report (in Italian); Report	Walker 73'; Spacey 78'

Stadio Comunale, Solofra
Referee: Gilles Veissière (France)

=== Second leg ===
7 November 1992
15:00

England	0–3	Italy
	FIGC Report (in Italian); Report	Bampton 54' (o.g.); Law 55' (o.g.); Morace 79'

Millmoor, Rotherham
Referee: José Mendes Pratas (Portugal)

Italy won 6–2 on aggregate.

7 November 1992
13:00

Denmark	1–1	Sweden
Rasmussen 33'	DBU Report (in Danish); SvFF report (in Swedish); Report	Videkull 30'

Hjørring Stadion, Hjørring
Attendance: 609
Referee: Leon Schelings (Belgium)

Denmark won 3–2 on aggregate.

7 November 1992
14:30

Netherlands	0–3	Norway
	KNVB Report (in Dutch); NFF Report (in Norwegian); Report	Riise 30'; Medalen 37'; Svensson 52'

Sportpark Tijenraan, Raalte
Attendance: 1,500
Referee: Gerd Grabher (Austria)

Norway won 6–0 on aggregate.

14 November 1992

Germany	0–0	Russia
	DFB Report (in German); Report

Jahnstadion, Rheine
Attendance: 2,431
Referee: Frank McDonald

Germany won 7–0 on aggregate.

Italy, Denmark, Norway and Germany qualified for the final tournament.
