= Jana Nováková =

Jana Nováková may refer to:

- Jana Nováková (actress) (1948–1968), Czech film actress and model
- Jana Nováková (footballer) (born 1960), Czech retired footballer
