= Evelyn Carnegie =

Irish footballer and academic

Personal information
- Full name: Evelyn Mary Carnegie
- Date of birth: 8 December 1967 (age 58)
- Position: Defender

International career
Years	Team	Apps	(Gls)
1992	Ireland		

Evelyn Mary Carnegie (born 8 December 1967) is an Irish academic and former association football player who represented the Republic of Ireland women's national football team. She is currently the Head of the Sport and Physical Activity Department at Edge Hill University.

In September 1992, Carnegie played for Ireland in a 10–0 defeat to Sweden during the UEFA Women's Euro 1993 qualification. She later represented the Liverpool County Football Association.
