= Sissel Grude =

Norwegian footballer and coach (born 1967)

Personal information
- Date of birth: 17 February 1967 (age 59)
- Place of birth: Ålgård, Norway
- Position: Forward

Senior career*
| Years | Team | Apps | (Gls) |
| –1984 | Ålgård FK | | |
| 1984–1989 | Klepp IL | | (46+) |
| 2011 | Klepp IL B | 1 | |

International career^{‡}
| 1988–1989 | Norway | 14 | (9) |
- * Club domestic league appearances and goals as of 09:13, 24 April 2021 (UTC) ‡ National team caps and goals as of 09:13, 24 April 2021 (UTC)

Sissel Grude (born 17 February 1967) is a Norwegian former footballer, who made 14 appearances for the Norway women's national football team. At club level, she played for Norwegian teams Ålgård FK and Klepp IL.

== Club career ==
Grude played for Ålgård FK in the Norwegian 2. divisjon. In 1984, she was part of the Ålgård team that lost the regional Rogaland Cup Final 6–3 to Klepp IL. It was Grude's final match for Ålgård, as she signed for Klepp later in 1984. Grude scored 12 goals for Klepp in the 1987 1. divisjon, as Klepp won the league. She scored 16 goals in the 1988 1. divisjon, and 18 goals in the 1989 1. divisjon. She scored two goals in the 1989 Norwegian Women's Cup Final, as Klepp beat Trondheims-Ørn 2–1 to win the competition.

Grude retired from football in Autumn 1989, at the age of 22. In 2011, she returned to Klepp as a coach, focused on training the team's strikers. She also made one appearance for the Klepp B team.

== International career ==
At international level, Grude made 14 appearances for the Norway women's national football team, scoring nine goals. She was not selected for the 1987 European Competition for Women's Football, despite having trained with the national team earlier in the season. She was part of the Norway team that won the 1988 FIFA Women's Invitation Tournament, beating Sweden 1–0 in the final. Her debut cap came in the 1–0 quarter-final win over the United States on 8 June 1988, as a 71st-minute substitute (matches were 80 minutes long) for Linda Medalen.

She scored two goals at the 1989 European Competition for Women's Football, making her the tournament's joint top scorer alongside Ursula Lohn of West Germany. She also scored two goals in the qualifying knockout stages, and that joint total of four goals was matched only by Lena Videkull of Sweden. Norway finished as runners up to West Germany in the tournament, and Grude scored Norway's only goal in the final, where they lost 4–1.
