= Marie Tlachová =

Czech footballer (born 1968)

Personal information
- Full name: Marie Wasner-Tlachová
- Date of birth: 8 February 1968 (age 58)
- Position: Defender

Senior career*
Years	Team	Apps	(Gls)
- Slavia Prague
- Battenberg
- Nürnberg
- SG Limburgerhof

International career
–1993	Czechoslovakia		
1993–2000	Czech Republic	29	(3)
- * Club domestic league appearances and goals

Marie Wasner (née Tlachová; born 8 February 1968) is a Czech retired footballer who played for the German side 1. FC Nürnberg. Tlachová represented the Czech Republic women's national football team 29 times and scored 3 goals. Wasner-Tlachová became the first Czech footballer to play in the Frauen-Bundesliga.

== International career ==
Tlachová represented Czechoslovakia at the 1988 FIFA Women's Invitation Tournament scoring 2 goals against Japan winning 2–1.
