= Helle Rotbøll =

Danish footballer (born 1963)

Personal information
- Date of birth: 8 October 1963 (age 63)
- Position: Defender

Senior career*
Years	Team	Apps	(Gls)
- HEI Aarhus

International career
1985–1990	Denmark	15	(4)
- * Club domestic league appearances and goals

Helle Rotbøll (born 8 October 1963) is a Danish former footballer who played as a defender for the Denmark women's national football team. She was part of the team at the 1991 FIFA Women's World Cup and UEFA Women's Euro 1991. At the club level, she played for HEI Aarhus in Denmark.
