= Helle Jensen =

Danish footballer (born 1969)

Personal information
- Date of birth: 23 March 1969 (age 57)
- Place of birth: Aalborg, Denmark
- Position: Forward

Youth career
- B52/Aalborg

Senior career*
Years	Team	Apps	(Gls)
–1989	B52/Aalborg		
1989–1993	B 1909		
1994–1996	Fortuna Hjørring		
1997–1998	Speranza Osaka (Note: At the time, the team was called Panasonic Bambina LSC)		
1999–2000	Fortuna Hjørring		

International career
1987–1996	Denmark	77	(38)
- * Club domestic league appearances and goals

Helle Jensen (born 23 March 1969) is a Danish former football forward who played for the Denmark women's national football team. She was inducted into the Danish Football Hall of Fame in 2024.

== Club career ==
Jensen played youth football with B52/Aalborg and started her professional career with the club. In 1989 she signed with B1909 at 20 years old. Following a period of league dominance by HEI Aarhus, Jensen helped B1909 win the league in 1992 and 1993. She signed with Fortuna Hjørring in 1994 and won the league with the club for three consecutive years, before signing with Japanese club Speranza Osaka (at the time known as Panasonic Bambina LSC). Jensen spent two years with the Japanese side, before returning to Fortuna and winning the league once more in her final season before retiring in 2000 as the then-league season top scorer.

== International career ==
She made her national team debut at 18 years old on 20 May 1987 in Sweden. She competed at the 1996 Summer Olympics, playing three matches although she was only fit enough to play for half of each match due to a recent recurrence of a knee injury. Jensen won 77 caps with the Denmark national team and scored 38 goals.

== International goals ==
No.	Date	Venue	Opponent	Score	Result	Competition
1.	7 October 1987	Oslo, Norway	Norway	1–0	1–0	1989 European Competition for Women's Football qualifying
2.	14 October 1989	Bern, Switzerland	Switzerland	1–0	4–0	UEFA Women's Euro 1991 qualifying
3.	14 October 1989	Bern, Switzerland	Switzerland	2–0	4–0	UEFA Women's Euro 1991 qualifying
4.	25 November 1989	Antequera, Spain	Spain	2–1	3–1	UEFA Women's Euro 1991 qualifying
5.	28 April 1990	Vejle, Denmark	Italy	1–0	1–0	UEFA Women's Euro 1991 qualifying
6.	23 May 1990	Vejle, Denmark	Switzerland	1–0	4–0	UEFA Women's Euro 1991 qualifying
7.	23 May 1990	Vejle, Denmark	Switzerland	2–0	4–0	UEFA Women's Euro 1991 qualifying
8.	13 June 1990	Vejle, Denmark	Spain	1–0	5–0	UEFA Women's Euro 1991 qualifying
9.	13 June 1990	Vejle, Denmark	Spain	3–0	5–0	UEFA Women's Euro 1991 qualifying
10.	21 September 1991	Tampere, Finland	Finland	1–1	1–1	UEFA Women's Euro 1993 qualifying
11.	16 October 1991	Aalborg, Denmark	France	2–0	4–1	UEFA Women's Euro 1993 qualifying
12.	17 November 1991	Guangzhou, China	New Zealand	1–0	3–0	1991 FIFA Women's World Cup
13.	17 November 1991	Guangzhou, China	New Zealand	2–0	3–0	1991 FIFA Women's World Cup
14.	2 May 1992	Quimper, France	France	3–0	4–0	UEFA Women's Euro 1993 qualifying
15.	15 August 1993	Kaunas, Lithuania	Lithuania	1–0	11–0	UEFA Women's Euro 1995 qualifying
16.	15 August 1993	Kaunas, Lithuania	Lithuania	11–0	11–0	UEFA Women's Euro 1995 qualifying
17.	29 September 1993	Hjørring, Denmark	Bulgaria	2–0	6–1	UEFA Women's Euro 1995 qualifying
18.	29 September 1993	Hjørring, Denmark	Bulgaria	3–0	6–1	UEFA Women's Euro 1995 qualifying
19.	15 June 1994	Idestrup, Denmark	Lithuania	1–0	11–0	UEFA Women's Euro 1995 qualifying
20.	15 June 1994	Idestrup, Denmark	Lithuania	2–0	11–0	UEFA Women's Euro 1995 qualifying
21.	15 June 1994	Idestrup, Denmark	Lithuania	5–0	11–0	UEFA Women's Euro 1995 qualifying
22.	15 June 1994	Idestrup, Denmark	Lithuania	6–0	11–0	UEFA Women's Euro 1995 qualifying
23.	6 June 1995	Västerås, Sweden	Australia	3–0	5–0	1995 FIFA Women's World Cup
24.	25 July 1996	Orlando, United States	Sweden	1–3	1–3	1996 Summer Olympics

== See also ==
- Denmark at the 1996 Summer Olympics
