= Thekla Krause =

German footballer

Personal information
- Date of birth: 18 May 1969 (age 57)
- Position: Forward

International career
Years	Team	Apps	(Gls)
- Germany

Thekla Krause (born 18 May 1969) is a former German international footballer who played as a forward. She was a member of the Germany national team. She was part of the team at the 1989 European Championship.

== Career ==
=== Clubs ===
Krause began her career at Fortuna Sachsenroß Hannover. With her club she reached the semi-finals of the German championship in 1988, but did not advance after two 0–1 defeats against KBC Duisburg. A year later she became champion of the Oberliga Nord with her club. She qualified in 1990 for the then newly introduced two-pronged Bundesliga. After her club gave up the starting place in 1997 despite sporting qualification for the single-track Bundesliga, she switched to the Sportfreunde Siegen. On the first day of the 1997/98 season, she scored the first goal of the single-track Bundesliga.

For the 1999/2000 season she moved to Hamburger SV. In 2002, the bank clerk joined the then district league club FFC Oldesloe 2000. The team initially managed to get promoted to the Verbandsliga, and after promotion to the Regionalliga Nord in 2004, she retired.

=== National team ===
Krause gained five caps for the senior national team in 1988, for which she scored two goals.
