= John Lloyd (referee) =

Welsh footballer and referee

John Lloyd (born 15 February 1948) is a Welsh former football player and referee. As a referee he worked in The Football League and Premier League and was a member of the Welsh FIFA List. He is one of only three referees (alongside Steve Baines and Bob Matthewson) who have made League appearances as a player.

== Career ==
Lloyd figured in two matches as an outside-right for Wrexham between 1965 and 1967. That was the end of his League playing career but he stayed in the town and developed a career as a referee. In 1982, he gained a place as a Football League linesman and three years later moved up to the referees list.

In common with all Welsh referees who attained this level Lloyd was also an international official and was soon in action in Europe. His first match in the middle in Iceland in September 1996 saw visitors Sporting CP achieve an emphatic 9-0 victory over Akranes in a UEFA Cup tie. Domestically he made steady progress. He started to make a bigger impression early in 1993. He was in charge of a League Cup quarter-final between Blackburn Rovers and Cambridge United and two months later was one of several officials drafted into the new Premier League. He retained this status for the following season (1993–1994), including a match at runners-up Blackburn (against Ipswich Town) on the penultimate weekend.

That proved to be his final game at Premier level and he reverted to the Football League for his final two seasons. When he retired in 1996 he was the last referee from North Wales, leaving Keith Burge from Tonypandy as the sole Welsh National List referee. Since then he has become a Football League assessor and worked as an after-dinner speaker.
