= Jana Nováková (footballer) =

Czech footballer

Personal information
- Date of birth: 15 April 1960 (age 66)
- Place of birth: Prague, Czechoslovakia
- Position: Forward

Senior career*
Years	Team	Apps	(Gls)
1975–1986	Slavia Prague		
1983–1985	Fiammamonza		
1988–1991	Slavia Prague		

International career
1976–1992	Czechoslovakia	30	(12)
- * Club domestic league appearances and goals

Jana Nováková (born 15 April 1960) is a Czech retired football player. She won Czechoslovak women's football championships titles with Sparta Prague. Nováková was one the first Czech female players to play in Serie A.

== Personal life ==
Nováková has a sister Alena Nováková who also played professional footballer.

== Bibliography ==
- AA.VV., Società Sportiva Fiammamonza - 25 anni di sport 1970/1995, Monza (MI), Fiammamonza, printed by Memigraph -Introbio (LC), April 1995, p. 51.
- Luca Barboni and Gabriele Cecchi, Women's Football Yearbook 2002/2003, Agnano Pisano (PI), Etruria Football Club - Stamperia Editoriale Pisana S.r.l., July 2003, p. 49, Jana Nováková's career profile from the 1992–1993 season to 2001–2002.
- Luboš Jeřábek, Československý fotbal v číslech a faktech (Czechoslovak Football in Numbers and Facts), Prague, Olympia, 1991, pp. 222–224.
- Luboš Jeřábek, Český a československý fotbal - lexikon osobností a klubů (Czech and Czechoslovak Football – Lexicon of Personalities and Clubs), Prague (CZE), Grada Publishing, a.s., 2007, p. 139.
