= Marjoke de Bakker =

Dutch footballer

Personal information
- Date of birth: 9 November 1959 (age 66)
- Position: Forward

Senior career*
Years	Team	Apps	(Gls)
- Kooger Football Club

International career
1979–1991	Netherlands	61	(29)
- * Club domestic league appearances and goals

Marjoke de Bakker is a former Dutch professional footballer who played as a forward for Kooger Football Club and the Netherlands women's national team, earning 61 caps. For 20 years she was the all-time record goal scorer for her country, having scored 29 times. On 21 August 2010 she lost her record when Manon Melis scored twice against Belarus, her 29th and 30th international goals. Melis subsequently lost her record to Vivianne Miedema on 15 June 2019. As of December 2020 de Bakker ranks fifth on the all-time goal scoring list for the Dutch women's football team.

== International goals ==
No.	Date	Venue	Opponent	Score	Result	Competition
1.	21 July 1979	Rimini, Italy	Wales	1–0	2–0	1979 European Competition for Women's Football
2.	23 July 1979	Rimini, Italy	Sweden	1–1	1–1	1979 European Competition for Women's Football
3.	13 October 1982	Groningen, Netherlands	Denmark	2–1	2–1	1984 European Competition for Women's Football qualifying
4.	28 September 1985	Zaventem, Belgium	Belgium	3–1	3–1	1987 European Competition for Women's Football qualifying
5.	26 October 1995	Cambrai, France	France	1–0	5–3	1987 European Competition for Women's Football qualifying
6.	18 October 1986	Hoogeveen, Netherlands	Sweden	1–0	2–0	1987 European Competition for Women's Football qualifying
7.	7 November 1987	Nuth, Netherlands	Scotland	3–0	4–0	1989 European Competition for Women's Football qualifying
8.	7 November 1987	Nuth, Netherlands	Scotland	4–0	4–0	1989 European Competition for Women's Football qualifying
9.	29 November 1987	Dublin, Ireland	Republic of Ireland	1–0	1–0	1989 European Competition for Women's Football qualifying
10.	1 October 1988	Valkenswaard, Netherlands	Sweden	1–0	1–0	1989 European Competition for Women's Football qualifying
11.	22 October 1988	Horten, Norway	Norway	1–2	1–2	1989 European Competition for Women's Football qualifying
12.	19 March 1990	Belfast, Northern Ireland	Northern Ireland	1–0	6–0	UEFA Women's Euro 1991 qualifying
13.	19 March 1990	Belfast, Northern Ireland	Northern Ireland	2–0	6–0	UEFA Women's Euro 1991 qualifying
14.	22 September 1990	Kaatsheuvel, Netherlands	Northern Ireland	1–0	9–0	UEFA Women's Euro 1991 qualifying
15.	22 September 1990	Kaatsheuvel, Netherlands	Northern Ireland	2–0	9–0	UEFA Women's Euro 1991 qualifying
16.	22 September 1990	Kaatsheuvel, Netherlands	Northern Ireland	4–0	9–0	UEFA Women's Euro 1991 qualifying
17.	22 September 1990	Kaatsheuvel, Netherlands	Northern Ireland	7–0	9–0	UEFA Women's Euro 1991 qualifying
