= Linda Medalen =

Norwegian footballer (born 1965)

Personal information
- Full name: Linda Medalen
- Date of birth: 17 June 1965 (age 61)
- Place of birth: Sandnes, Norway
- Height: 1.67 m (5 ft 6 in)
- Positions: Forward; midfielder; defender

Youth career
- IL Brodd

Senior career*
Years	Team	Apps	(Gls)
1981–1986	Viking FK		
1987–1992	Asker		
1992–1998	Nikko Securities		
1994	→ Klepp IL (loan)		
1997	→ Asker (loan)		
1998–2001	Asker		
2003	Asker		
2006	Asker		

International career^{‡}
1987–1999	Norway	152	(64)
Medal record
Women's football
Representing Norway
Olympic Games
Bronze medal – third place	1996 Atlanta	Team
World Cup
Gold medal – first place	Sweden 1995	Team
Silver medal – second place	China 1991	Team
European Championship
Gold medal – first place	Italy 1993	Team
Silver medal – second place	Denmark 1991	Team
Silver medal – second place	Germany 1989	Team
- * Club domestic league appearances and goals as of 12:07, 29 January 2022 (UTC) ‡ National team caps and goals as of 12:07, 29 January 2022 (UTC)

Linda Medalen (born 17 June 1965) is a former Norwegian footballer. She is one of Norway's most celebrated former footballers, finishing her international career with 152 caps, scoring 64 goals. She was on the Norway team that won the 1995 FIFA Women's World Cup.

She played most of her career in Norway with Asker Fotball, and retired in 2006, at 41 years old. She also spent seven seasons in Japan with Nikko. She started her career as a striker, but as her career progressed, she moved further back on the field, and was playing toward the end of her career in central defence.

Apart from playing football, Medalen worked as a police officer. In 2007, she was elected to serve as a local politician in Asker municipality council for the Conservative Party. Medalen is openly lesbian, coming out in a Se og Hør article in June 1999. On 16 June 2012, Medalen married Trude Flan. She stands at 1.67 m (5 ft 5 1/2 in).

== Club career ==
In August 2000 Medalen revealed that she was considering an approach from the Women's United Soccer Association (WUSA), following contact from the nascent American professional league's vice president of playing personnel Lauren Gregg.

Medalen was sent-off at half-time in the 2001 Norwegian Women's Cup final, for slapping away Gøril Kringen's hand during a disagreement. The disappointment from Asker's 3–2 defeat was compounded as the final was intended to be Medalen's farewell appearance before her retirement from football. In the 2003 Toppserien Medalen returned to Asker as a player-coach. In 2006 41-year-old Medalen made another playing comeback and was selected for Asker's 3–2 Norwegian Women's Cup final defeat by Røa IL.

== International career ==
Medalen made her debut for the Norway women's national football team on 7 October 1987, in a 1–0 1989 European Competition for Women's Football qualifying defeat by Denmark women's national football team at the Ullevaal Stadion.

At the 1988 FIFA Women's Invitation Tournament, Medalen scored her first two national team goals in her fourth appearance; Norway's opening 4–0 win over Thailand in Jiangmen. She scored again in a 3–0 win over Australia, then scored the only goal in the final win over Sweden at the Tianhe Stadium in Guangzhou. Medalen was named to the tournament All-Star team.

Norway rebounded from their qualifying defeat by Denmark to qualify for the 1989 European Competition for Women's Football tournament. Medalen's first-minute goal in the 2–1 semi-final win over Sweden helped set up a final meeting with the West German hosts in Osnabrück, but reigning European champions Norway were beaten 4–1.

At UEFA Women's Euro 1991, Medalen's Norway reached the final again but were beaten by Germany, this time 3–1 after extra-time. This placing secured qualification for the inaugural 1991 FIFA Women's World Cup in China. Medalen scored six goals, including two in the semi-final win over Sweden and an equaliser in the 2–1 final defeat by the United States. She was awarded FIFA's "Bronze Ball" as the tournament's third best player.

In Norway's opening UEFA Women's Euro 1993 qualifying fixture, Medalen scored four times in a 10–0 win over Switzerland. At the UEFA Women's Euro 1993 final tournament Norway recaptured their European title, beating hosts Italy 1–0 in the final. In UEFA Women's Euro 1995 Norway missed out on a fifth successive final appearance, being eliminated in the semi-finals by Sweden, 7–5 on aggregate, despite Medalen's second-leg goal in Jönköping.

Medalen was an important player in the Norway team which won the 1995 FIFA Women's World Cup in Sweden.

At the 1999 FIFA Women's World Cup in the United States, Medalen was Norway's captain. She also had a new role as a central defender, having struggled to adapt to incoming coach Per-Mathias Høgmo's possession-based tactics for his forwards.

Medalen felt she had sufficiently recovered from a ligament injury to participate at the 2000 Summer Olympics. She was disappointed when Høgmo disagreed and left her out. She was also disappointed at the withdrawal of her Norwegian Football Federation central contract worth 3500kr per month: "it was like getting a knife in the back".

== Personal life ==
Medalen came out as a lesbian in an interview with the Se og Hør gossip magazine in 1999, declaring: "I love a girl, it's not worse". She brought her partner Kristin Bitnes to that year's FIFA Women's World Cup in the United States, but the couple separated after eight years together in 2006. Medalen was part of an exceptionally strong Norwegian women's football selection at the 2002 Gay Games in Sydney. Medalen met dance instructor Trude Flan in 2010 and the two were married two years later. Medalen announced their separation in January 2022.

In 1997 Medalen posed with a carefully-positioned football for semi-nude photographs in Se og Hør. It has been reported as evidence of sexism that Medalen earned 70000kr for the photographs but stood to earn only 27500kr if she had won that year's UEFA Women's Championship with Norway. Her cousin Rune Medalen played football for Tippeligaen clubs Bryne FK and Viking FK.

In 2020 Medalen participated in the "Mesternes mester" (English: master of masters) reality television programme, screened on NRK. In 2011 she had appeared in another reality television series, 71 Degrees North. TVNorge apologised to Medalen after broadcasting images of her topless without her consent.

During her football career, Medalen was relatively outspoken. She enjoyed Norway's rivalry with the United States team, frequently exchanging "trash-talk" with her friend Michelle Akers. While her habit of scoring important goals against neighbours Sweden saw Medalen ruefully nicknamed "Svenskdöderskan" (English: the Swede killer) in Sweden.

== Career statistics ==
=== International goals ===
No.	Date	Venue	Opponent	Score	Result	Competition
1.	1 June 1988	Jiangmen, China	Thailand	?–0	4–0	1988 FIFA Women's Invitation Tournament
2.	1 June 1988	Jiangmen, China	Thailand	?–0	4–0	1988 FIFA Women's Invitation Tournament
3.	6 June 1998	Jiangmen, China	Australia	?–0	3–0	1988 FIFA Women's Invitation Tournament
4.	12 June 1988	Guangzhou, China	Sweden	1–0	1–0	1988 FIFA Women's Invitation Tournament
5.	21 August 1988	Klepp, Norway	England	1–0	2–0	1989 European Competition for Women's Football qualifying
6.	28 June 1989	Lüdenscheid, Germany	Sweden	1–0	2–1	1989 European Competition for Women's Football
7.	27 May 1990	Klepp, Norway	England	1–0	2–0	UEFA Women's Euro 1991 qualifying
8.	29 September 1991	Aarau, Switzerland	Switzerland	1–0	10–0	UEFA Women's Euro 1993 qualifying
9.	29 September 1991	Aarau, Switzerland	Switzerland	4–0	10–0	UEFA Women's Euro 1993 qualifying
10.	29 September 1991	Aarau, Switzerland	Switzerland	5–0	10–0	UEFA Women's Euro 1993 qualifying
11.	29 September 1991	Aarau, Switzerland	Switzerland	9–0	10–0	UEFA Women's Euro 1993 qualifying
12.	19 November 1991	Guangzhou, China	New Zealand	2–0	4–0	1991 FIFA Women's World Cup
13.	19 November 1991	Guangzhou, China	New Zealand	3–0	4–0	1991 FIFA Women's World Cup
14.	21 November 1991	Guangzhou, China	Denmark	2–1	2–1	1991 FIFA Women's World Cup
15.	27 November 1991	Guangzhou, China	Sweden	2–1	4–1	1991 FIFA Women's World Cup
16.	27 November 1991	Guangzhou, China	Sweden	4–1	4–1	1991 FIFA Women's World Cup
17.	30 November 1991	Guangzhou, China	United States	1–1	1–2	1991 FIFA Women's World Cup
18.	1 June 1993	Borås, Sweden	Sweden	2–2	2–4	Friendly
19.	16 October 1993	Bergen, Norway	Hungary	8–0	8–0	UEFA Women's Euro 1995 qualifying
20.	18 March 1994	Vila Real de Santo António, Portugal	Denmark	3–1	6–1	1994 Algarve Cup
21.	4 September 1994	Oslo, Norway	Finland	4–0	4–0	UEFA Women's Euro 1995 qualifying
22.	24 September 1994	Prague, Czech Republic	Czech Republic	3–0	8–0	UEFA Women's Euro 1995 qualifying
23.	24 September 1994	Prague, Czech Republic	Czech Republic	5–0	8–0	UEFA Women's Euro 1995 qualifying
24.	4 March 1995	Jönköping, Sweden	Sweden	1–0	1–4	UEFA Women's Euro 1995
25.	16 March 1995	Quarteira, Portugal	Italy	?–?	3–1	1995 Algarve Cup
26.	17 March 1995	Portimão, Portugal	Sweden	1–0	2–0	1995 Algarve Cup
27.	6 June 1995	Karlstad, Sweden	Nigeria	5–0	8–0	1995 FIFA Women's World Cup
28.	13 June 1995	Karlstad, Sweden	Denmark	2–0	3–1	1995 FIFA Women's World Cup
29.	19 September 1995	Ulefoss, Norway	Slovakia	1–0	17–0	UEFA Women's Euro 1997 qualifying
30.	19 September 1995	Ulefoss, Norway	Slovakia	8–0	17–0	UEFA Women's Euro 1997 qualifying
31.	19 September 1995	Ulefoss, Norway	Slovakia	9–0	17–0	UEFA Women's Euro 1997 qualifying
32.	2 May 1996	Jena, Germany	Germany	3–1	3–1	UEFA Women's Euro 1997 qualifying
33.	6 July 1996	Kolbotn, Norway	Finland	2–0	7–0	UEFA Women's Euro 1997 qualifying
34.	6 July 1996	Kolbotn, Norway	Finland	6–0	7–0	UEFA Women's Euro 1997 qualifying
35.	6 July 1996	Kolbotn, Norway	Finland	7–0	7–0	UEFA Women's Euro 1997 qualifying
36.	21 July 1996	Washington, D.C., United States	Brazil	1–0	2–2	1996 Summer Olympics
37.	23 July 1996	Washington, D.C., United States	Germany	2–1	3–2	1996 Summer Olympics
38.	25 July 1996	Washington, D.C., United States	Japan	2–0	4–0	1996 Summer Olympics
39.	28 July 1996	Athens, United States	United States	1–0	1–2 (a.e.t.)	1996 Summer Olympics
40.	21 March 1998	Loulé, Portugal	Denmark	4–0	4–1	1998 Algarve Cup
41.	16 March 1999	Quarteira, Portugal	Sweden	1–0	2–1	1999 Algarve Cup
42.	23 June 1999	Landover, United States	Canada	5–1	7–1	1999 FIFA Women's World Cup

== Honours ==
Asker

- Toppserien: 1988, 1991, 1998, 1999
- Norwegian Women's Cup: 1990, 1991, 2000

Nikko

- L. League: 1996, 1997, 1998
- Empress's Cup: 1992, 1996

Norway

- FIFA Women's World Cup: 1995
- UEFA Women's Championship: 1993

== See also ==
- List of women's footballers with 100 or more international caps
