= Sylvie Saunier =

French footballer (born 1965)

Personal information
- Date of birth: 25 February 1965 (age 61)
- Place of birth: Moulins, France
- Position: Midfielder

International career
Years	Team	Apps	(Gls)
	France	17	(1)

Sylvie Saunier is a retired French professional footballer who played as a forward for French club AS Moulins and the France national team. Saunier in her playing days was called the female Michel Platini.

== International career ==
Saunier represented France 17 times and scored 1 goal.
