= Diana Petrakieva =

Bulgarian footballer

Personal information
- Full name: Diana Petrakieva
- Date of birth: 24 October 1981 (age 45)
- Place of birth: Bulgaria
- Position: Midfielder

Senior career*
Years	Team	Apps	(Gls)
- Grand Hotel Varna
- LP Super Sport
2005–	NSA Sofia		

International career
2006–	Bulgaria		
- * Club domestic league appearances and goals

Diana Petrakieva (Bulgarian: Диана Петракиева; born 24 October 1981) is a Bulgarian former footballer who played as a midfielder. She spent most of her club career with NSA Sofia in the Bulgarian women's football championship, with whom she also played in the UEFA Women's Champions League. She has also appeared in the competition with Grand Hotel Varna and LP Super Sport Sofia.

Petrakieva has been a member of the Bulgaria women's national football team since 2006 and has served as its captain. She has taken part in qualification matches for major international tournaments, including the qualifying competition for the 2015 FIFA Women's World Cup, where she featured in a 2014 match against Kazakhstan.

After the end of her playing career, Petrakieva has been listed among the coaches working in the youth and women's structure of football club NSA Sofia.
