= Lisbeth Bakken =

Norwegian footballer (born 1967)

Personal information
- Date of birth: 24 October 1967 (age 59)
- Position: Midfielder

Senior career*
Years	Team	Apps	(Gls)
- Sprint-Jeløy

International career
1987–1991	Norway	14	(4)
- * Club domestic league appearances and goals

Lisbeth Bakken (born 24 October 1967) is a Norwegian footballer who played as a midfielder for the Norway women's national football team. She was part of the team at the UEFA Women's Euro 1991. On club level she played for Sprint-Jeløy in Norway.
