= Ingrid Van Herle =

Belgian association football player

Personal information
- Date of birth: 5 August 1970 (age 56)
- Place of birth: Bilzen, Belgium
- Position: Defender

Senior career*
Years	Team	Apps	(Gls)
1991-1993	Standard Fémina de Liège		

International career
1988-1999	Belgium	48	(5)
- * Club domestic league appearances and goals

Ingrid Vanherle (born 5 August 1970) is a retired Belgian football player who played for Standard Fémina de Liège and the Belgium women's national football team. Since July 2015, Vanherle became the porting director of the Robert Louis-Dreyfus Academy of Standard de Liège.
