= Marielle Breton =

French footballer (born 1965)

Personal information
- Date of birth: 26 October 1965 (age 61)
- Position: Defender

Senior career*
Years	Team	Apps	(Gls)
- Juvisy FCF

International career
	France	24	(3)
- * Club domestic league appearances and goals

Marielle Breton (born 26 October 1965) is a French former footballer who played as a defender for Juvisy FCF of the Division 1 Féminine. After retiring from football she decided to work in administration for FC Lorient.
