= Isabelle Musset =

French footballer (born 1960)

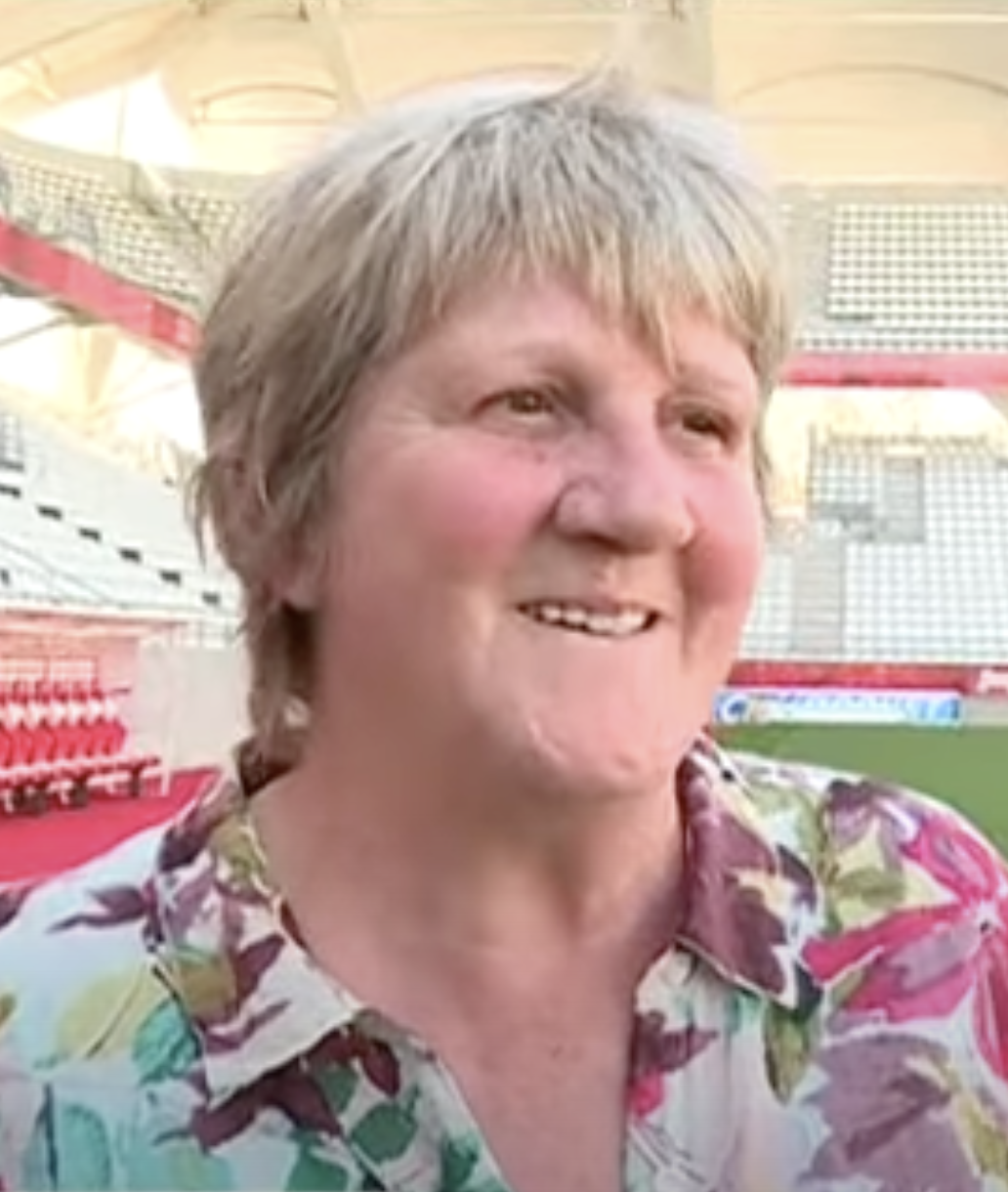
- Isabelle Musset in 2018

Personal information
- Date of birth: 10 September 1960 (age 66)
- Place of birth: Vouziers, France
- Position: Forward

Senior career*
Years	Team	Apps	(Gls)
1975–1982	Reims		

International career
1976–1990	France	41	(15)
- * Club domestic league appearances and goals

Isabelle Musset (born 10 September 1960) is a former French professional footballer who plays as a forward for French club Reims and the France national team. She won five Division 1 Féminine with Stade de Reims between 1975 and 1982.

== International career ==
Mussett represented France 41 times and scored 15 goals.

== Post career ==
After retiring from professional football, Mussett became a schoolteacher. She retired in 2022.

== Honours ==
- French Championship
- Winners (5): 1975, 1976, 1977, 1980, 1982
