= Anu Toikka =

Finnish association football player

Personal information
- Date of birth: 27 October 1963 (age 63)
- Position: Midfielder

International career
Years	Team	Apps	(Gls)
1979-1992	Finland	29	(8)

Anu Toikka (born 27 October 1963) is a retired Finnish footballer who played for HJK and the Finnish women's national team.

== Honours ==
=== HJK ===
- 1 Finnish League:1991
- 1 Finnish Cup:1992
