= Régine Mismacq =

French footballer (born 1965)

Personal information
- Date of birth: 2 October 1965 (age 61)
- Place of birth: Paris, France
- Position: Forward

Senior career*
Years	Team	Apps	(Gls)
1981–1990	VGA Saint-Maur		
1990–1991	FCF Juvisy		
1991–1995	Toulouse Olympique Mirail		

International career
1984–1992	France	37	(9)
- * Club domestic league appearances and goals

Régine Mismacq (born 2 October 1965) is a French footballer who played as a striker. Mismacq won five Division 1 Féminine titles with VGA Saint-Maur.

== National team ==
Régine Mismacq won thirty-seven caps and nine goals for the France women's national team between 1989 and 1993.

== Honours ==
- Division 1 Féminine
  - Winners (5): 1982–83, 1984–85, 1985–86, 1986–87, 1987–88, 1989–90
