= Martine Puentes =

French association football player (born 1961)

Personal information
- Date of birth: 12 July 1961 (age 65)
- Position: Midfielder

Senior career*
Years	Team	Apps	(Gls)
1973-1992	VGA Saint-Maur		

International career
1987-1989	France	15	(5)
- * Club domestic league appearances and goals

Martine Puentes (born 12 July 1961) is a French former football player who played as a forward for French club VGA Saint-Maur of the Division 1 Féminine.
