= Czechoslovakia women's national football team =

Czechoslovakia
- Association: Československý fotbalový svaz/Československý futbalový zväz
- Confederation: UEFA (Europe)
- Home stadium: Various
- FIFA code: TCH
First colours

First international
- Italy 2–1 Czechoslovakia (Viareggio, Italy; 23 February 1968); Last International; Italy 2–2 Czechoslovakia (Italy; 12 September 1992)

Biggest win
- Czechoslovakia 3–0 Bulgaria (Czechoslovakia; 23 October 1988); Czechoslovakia 3–0 Hungary (Czechoslovakia; 29 September 1990); Czechoslovakia 3–0 Poland (Czechoslovakia; 28 June 1992)

Biggest defeat
- West Germany 5–0 Czechoslovakia (West Germany; 22 November 1989)

World Cup
- Appearances: None

The Czechoslovakia women's national football team was the national women's association football representing Czechoslovakia. It was established in 1968, in the midst of the Prague Spring, making it one of the pioneering women's football national teams.

Czechoslovakia's first game was played on February 23 that year in Viareggio, Italy against the also debuting Italian team, and resulted in a 2–1 loss. In 1970 Czechoslovakia registered in the first unofficial attempt at a World Cup, and it was scheduled to make its debut on July 7 in Bologna against Denmark. However, the team was not granted a visa to travel to the Western Bloc and had to withdraw. The same happened the following year.

Czechoslovakia's first official women's match took place in the Bratislava's Stadium Petržalka in 1985, ending in a 2–2 draw against Hungary. The team then went two years without a victory in its next seven games.

From October 1987 to November 1988 Czechoslovakia took part for the first time in the qualifying of the still unofficial European Championship. In the mid-time it took part in June 1988 in the China-based 1988 FIFA Women's Invitation Tournament, an essay for the first official World Cup three years later, where it failed to progress to the quarter-finals despite defeating Japan and drawing with impending powerhouse United States. In the European Championship Czechoslovakia was defeated by West Germany in the last qualifying round.

Through 1989 and 1990 Czechoslovakia played the first official European Championship's qualification, which also served as a qualifying for the 1991 World Cup. This time the team didn't make qualify past the first qualifying stage, ranking third in its group behind Germany and Hungary. In 1991–92 it didn't make it either, losing this time to Italy. This was the team's last appearance as Czechoslovakia was dissolved at the end of 1992. The following saw the foundation of the Czech and Slovak national teams, both serving as the Czechoslovak team's successor.

== Competition record ==
=== UEFA Women's Championship ===
UEFA Women's Championship record								Qualifying record					
Year	Result	GP	W	D	L	GS	GA	GP	W	D	L	GS	GA
(England) (Italy) (Norway) (Sweden) 1984	Did not enter							Did not enter					
(Norway) 1987	Did not enter							Did not enter					
(West Germany) 1989	Did not qualify							10	4	5	1	11	6
(Denmark) 1991	Did not qualify							6	3	0	3	8	10
(Italy) 1993	Did not qualify							4	2	1	1	7	6
Total	-	-	-	-	-	-	-	20	9	6	5	26	22

==== Match History ====
Competition	Stage	Result	Opponent	Position	Notes
(China) 1988 FIFA Invitation Tournament	Round 1	0–1	Sweden		
		2–1	Japan		
		0–0	United States	3 / 4	
1989 European Competition qualification	Round 1	1–1 0–0	Belgium		
		1–0 2–0	Spain		
		1–0 3–0	Bulgaria		
		2–2 0–0	France	2 / 5	
	Quarterfinals	1–1 0–2	West Germany		
1991 European Championship qualification	Round 1	2–0 3–2	Bulgaria		
		0–5 0–1	West Germany		
		0–2 3–0	Hungary	3 / 4	
1993 European Championship qualification	Round 1	2–1 3–0	Poland		
		0–3 2–2	Italy	2 / 3	
