= Janny Timisela =

Dutch football player (born 1962)

Personal information
- Date of birth: 23 September 1962 (age 64)
- Place of birth: Tiel, Netherlands
- Position: Midfielder

Senior career*
Years	Team	Apps	(Gls)
- RKTVC
1987	Hammarby		
1988	Hammarby		
1989–1990	Djurgården		

International career
1982–1997	Netherlands	63	(12)

Managerial career
- –2017: vv Maarssen
- 2017–: Fortuna Wormerveer
- * Club domestic league appearances and goals

Janny Timisela (born 23 September 1962) is a Dutch football manager and former footballer who played as a midfielder for Dutch and Swedish clubs and the national team.

== Club career ==
Born in Tiel, Timisela started her career in RKTVC. Timisela joined Hammarby in July 1987 from RKTVC as the first player from outside the Nordic countries in Swedish women's football and for the rest of the season. She also was the first Dutch footballer to play abroad. She then returned the following summer to Hammarby. In 1989, Timisela joined Djurgården for the season after having played for Hammarby on tourist visa the years before. After two seasons, Timisela returned to the Netherlands.

She also played for Puck Deventer and Ter Leede.

== International career ==
Timisela represented the Netherlands women's national football team 63 appearances and scored 12 times between 1982 and 1987. Timisela had a sister Fien Timisela who was also a football player.

== Post-playing career ==
After having managed vv Maarssen, Timisela was in 2017 appointed manager for Fortuna Wormerveer.
