= Britta Unsleber =

German footballer

Personal information
- Date of birth: 25 December 1966 (age 59)
- Place of birth: Darmstadt, Germany
- Position: Defender

Senior career*
Years	Team	Apps	(Gls)
1981–1984	TSV Eschollbrücken		
1984–1992	FSV Frankfurt		
1992–1994	TSV Siegen		
1994–?	FSV Frankfurt		

International career
1984–1993	Germany	54	(13)
- * Club domestic league appearances and goals

Britta Unsleber (born 25 December 1966 in Darmstadt) is former German international football player. The defender was capped 54 times for Germany, scoring 13 goals. She won two German championships and five cups with FSV Frankfurt. She also won a championship at TSV Siegen. In 1989 and 1991 she won the Women's EURO with the German national team.

== Club career ==
Unsleber's career began at TSV Eschollbrücken, where she had her first appearance for the senior team when only 14 years old. From 1984 on and for most of her career she played for FSV Frankfurt, where she won the championship in 1986 and 1995. With Frankfurt she also won cups in 1985, 1990, 1992, 1995, and 1996. From 1992 to 1994 Unsleber played for TSV Siegen, where she won the championship in 1994.

== International career ==
Unsleber was capped 54 times and scored 13 goals for Germany's national team. Her debut was on 21 November 1984 against the Netherlands. With Germany she won the 1989 and 1991 Women's EURO. Unsleber was also part of the team, which finished fourth at the 1991 FIFA Women's World Cup. She was capped for the last time against Denmark on 3 July 1993.

== Coaching career ==
Britta Unsleber currently is assistant coach at Sportfreunde Siegen, the club she played for between 1992 and 1994.
