= 2000 African Women's Championship squads =

Football tournament squads

This article describes the squads for the 2000 African Women's Championship.

The age listed for each player is on 11 November 2000, the first day of the tournament. The numbers of caps and goals listed for each player do not include any matches played after the start of the tournament. The club listed is the club for which the player last played a competitive match prior to the tournament. A flag is included for coaches who are of a different nationality than their own national team.

== Group A ==
=== Réunion ===
Head coach: Patrick Honorine

No.	Pos.	Player	Date of birth (age)	Caps	Club
		Kelly Bello			
		Laurianne Boyer			
		Marie Thérèse Fanovana			
		Carole Keita			
		Claure Lebon			
		Rachelle Lecoutre			
		Prisca Maraguet			
		Florence Mussard			
		Tania Nice			
		Nadège Orosmane			
		Lise May Ouledi			
		Sabrina Rakalovahini			
		Prisca Serveaux			
		Martine Turpin			
		Cathy Châteauroux			

=== South Africa ===
Head coaches: Fran Hilton-Smith and Ephraim Mashaba

No.	Pos.	Player	Date of birth (age)	Caps	Club
	MF	Desiree Ellis	14 March 1963 (aged 37)		
	MF	Portia Modise	20 June 1983 (aged 17)		
		Maud Khumalo			
		Sibongile Khumalo			
		Hilda Lekalakala			
		Makhosi Luthuli			
		Noriah Majekane			
		Martha Malaku			
		Delisile Mbatha			
		Nandipha Mlomo			
		Anna Modingoane			
		Evah Mokwape			
		Anna Monate			
		Veronica Phewa			
		Reineth Phutego			
		Joanne Solomon			
		Makhosane Zungu			

=== Uganda ===
Head coach: Sam Timbe

No.	Pos.	Player	Date of birth (age)	Caps	Club
	MF	Annet Nakimbugwe			
	FW	Oliver Mbekeka	22 August 1979 (aged 21)		
		Doreen Apolot			
		Racheal Babirye			
		Harriet Kayonjo			
		Fatuma Luwedoe			
		Fatuma Manashe			
		Sylvia Nagawa			
		Alaisa Nakanwagi			
		Becca Nakate			
		Robina Nakintu			
		Agnes Namata			
		Etheman Namatovu			
		Majidah Nantanda			
		Asha Sonko			

=== Zimbabwe ===
Head coach: Benedict Moyo

No.	Pos.	Player	Date of birth (age)	Caps	Club
	MF	Nomsa Moyo			
	MF	Precious Mpala			
	FW	Yesmore Mutero			
		Ruth Banda			
		Sithandile Khoza			
		Ennie Konje			
		Thandekile Mathobela			
		Tafadzwa Mhunduru			
		Seluleko Moyo			
		Christine Mpanza			
		Rosemary Mugadza			
		Siduduzile Nkomo			
		Fungai Nyamutukwa			
		Florence Nyerukai			
		Sithethelelwe Sibanda			
		Talent Zulu			

== Group B ==
=== Cameroon ===
Head coach: Robert Atah

No.	Pos.	Player	Date of birth (age)	Caps	Club
	MF	Françoise Bella			
		Bernadette Anong			
		Antoinette Anounga			
		Gladis Ayele			
		Desire Enama Abbe			
		Clarisse Gomoko			
		Alica Kacha			
		Judith Kenfack			
		Marceline Mete			
		Julienne Mvie Manga			
		Josephine Ndoumou Mike			
		Idelette Nguiadem			
		Lydienne Njolle Ekoh			
		Marie Nkami			
		Catherine Zock			

=== Ghana ===
Head coach: PSK Paha

No.	Pos.	Player	Date of birth (age)	Caps	Club
	GK	Fati Mohammed	4 June 1979 (aged 21)		
	GK	Memunatu Sulemana	4 November 1977 (aged 23)		
	DF	Lydia Ankrah	1 December 1973 (aged 26)		
	DF	Yaa Avoe	1 July 1982 (aged 18)		
	DF	Elizabeth Baidu	28 April 1978 (aged 22)		
	DF	Patience Sackey	22 April 1975 (aged 25)		
	DF	Kulu Yahaya	23 May 1976 (aged 24)		
	DF	Rita Yeboah	25 May 1976 (aged 24)		
	MF	Adjoa Bayor	17 May 1979 (aged 21)		
	MF	Genevive Clottey	25 April 1969 (aged 31)		
	MF	Memuna Darku	17 April 1979 (aged 21)		
	MF	Sheila Okai	14 February 1979 (aged 21)		
	FW	Mavis Dgajmah	21 December 1973 (aged 26)		
	FW	Gloria Foriwa	11 May 1981 (aged 19)		
	FW	Nana Gyamfuah	4 August 1978 (aged 22)		
	FW	Alberta Sackey	6 November 1972 (aged 28)		
		Florence Akyea			
		Rosemary Konadu			
		Genevive Sackey			

=== Morocco ===
Head coach: Alaoui Slimani

No.	Pos.	Player	Date of birth (age)	Caps	Club
	FW	Lamia Boumehdi			
	DF	Mina Rokbi			
	MF	Aïcha Barbou			
		Fatiha Bouramedane			
		Imane El Atrassi			
		Fama El Foukki			
		Fatima El Jazouli			
		Nisrine El Moufarej			
		Fatima Fathi			
		Ilham Haimoudi			
		Mounia Lhand			
		Nadia Maqdi			
		Jamila Mouftakhir			
		Rachida Mourachah			
		Badia Mourrad			
		Touria Najeh			
		Btissam Zidane			

=== Nigeria ===
Head coach: Ismaila Mabo

No.	Pos.	Player	Date of birth (age)	Caps	Club
	GK	Ann Chiejine	2 February 1974 (aged 26)		
	GK	Judith Chime	20 May 1978 (aged 22)		
	DF	Florence Ajayi	28 April 1977 (aged 23)		
	DF	Florence Iweta	29 March 1983 (aged 17)		
	DF	Yinka Kudaisi	25 August 1975 (aged 25)		
	DF	Perpetua Nkwocha	3 January 1976 (aged 24)		
	DF	Eberechi Opara	6 March 1976 (aged 24)		
	MF	Mercy Akide	26 August 1975 (aged 25)		
	MF	Maureen Mmadu	7 May 1975 (aged 25)		
	MF	Florence Omagbemi	2 February 1975 (aged 25)		
	MF	Martha Tarhemba	1 April 1978 (aged 22)		
	MF	Gloria Usieta	19 June 1977 (aged 23)		
	FW	Ifeanyi Chiejine	17 May 1983 (aged 17)		
	FW	Nkechi Egbe	5 February 1978 (aged 22)		
	FW	Stella Mbachu	16 April 1978 (aged 22)		
	FW	Rita Nwadike	3 November 1974 (aged 26)		
	FW	Olaitan Yusuf	12 January 1982 (aged 18)		
