= Football at the 2000 Summer Olympics – Women's team squads =

The women's football tournament at the 2000 Summer Olympics in Sydney was held from 13 to 28 September 2000. The women's tournament was a full international tournament with no restrictions on age. The eight national teams involved in the tournament were required to register a squad of 18 players, including two goalkeepers. Additionally, teams could name a maximum of four alternate players, numbered from 19 to 22. The alternate list could contain at most three outfielders, as at least one slot was reserved for a goalkeeper. In the event of serious injury during the tournament, an injured player could be replaced by one of the players in the alternate list. Only players in these squads were eligible to take part in the tournament.

The age listed for each player is on 13 September 2000, the first day of the tournament. The numbers of caps and goals listed for each player do not include any matches played after the start of the tournament. The club listed is the club for which the player last played a competitive match prior to the tournament. A flag is included for coaches who are of a different nationality than their own national team.

== Group E ==
=== Australia ===
Head coach: (United Kingdom) Chris Tanzey

Australia named a squad of 18 players and 4 alternates for the tournament.

No.	Pos.	Player	Date of birth (age)	Caps	Goals	Club
1	GK	Tracey Wheeler	26 September 1967 (aged 32)	43	0	(Football Australia) SASI Pirates
2	MF	Kate McShea	13 April 1983 (aged 17)	5	0	(Football Australia) Queensland Sting FC
3	DF	Bridgette Starr	10 December 1975 (aged 24)	49	1	(Football Australia) NSW Sapphires FC
4	MF	Heather Garriock	21 December 1982 (aged 17)	10	1	(Football Australia) NSW Sapphires FC
5	DF	Dianne Alagich	12 May 1979 (aged 21)	17	0	(Football Australia) SASI Pirates
6	DF	Anissa Tann-Darby	10 October 1967 (aged 32)	81	8	(Football Australia) NSW Sapphires FC
7	MF	Alison Forman (captain)	17 March 1969 (aged 31)	61	6	(Football Australia) Northern NSW Pride
8	DF	Cheryl Salisbury	8 March 1974 (aged 26)	61	23	(Football Australia) Northern NSW Pride
9	FW	Julie Murray	28 April 1970 (aged 30)	66	19	(Football Australia) NSW Sapphires FC
10	FW	Sunni Hughes	9 June 1968 (aged 32)	55	23	(Football Australia) Northern NSW Pride
11	MF	Sharon Black	4 April 1971 (aged 29)	50	19	(Football Australia) SASI Pirates
12	MF	Bryony Duus	7 October 1977 (aged 22)	21	2	(Football Australia) Queensland Sting FC
13	FW	Alicia Ferguson	31 October 1981 (aged 18)	24	5	(Football Australia) Queensland Sting FC
14	DF	Sacha Wainwright	6 February 1972 (aged 28)	26	1	(Football Australia) Canberra Eclipse FC
15	MF	Peita-Claire Hepperlin	24 December 1981 (aged 18)	10	0	(Football Australia) Canberra Eclipse FC
16	MF	Amy Wilson	9 June 1980 (aged 20)	20	0	(Football Australia) Canberra Eclipse FC
17	FW	Kelly Golebiowski	26 July 1981 (aged 19)	27	0	(Football Australia) NSW Sapphires FC
18	GK	Leanne Trimboli	10 November 1975 (aged 24)	3	0	(Football Australia) SASI Pirates

Unenrolled alternate players
No.	Pos.	Player	Date of birth (age)	Caps	Goals	Club
19	FW	Lisa Casagrande	29 May 1978 (aged 22)			
20	MF	Danielle Small	7 February 1979 (aged 21)			
21	DF	Amy Taylor	11 June 1979 (aged 21)			
22	GK	Joanne Butland	24 November 1978 (aged 21)			

=== Brazil ===
Head coach: José Duarte

Brazil named a squad of 18 players and 4 alternates for the tournament.

No.	Pos.	Player	Date of birth (age)	Caps	Goals	Club
1	GK	Andréia	14 September 1977 (aged 22)	9	0	(Brazilian Football Confederation) Vasco da Gama
2	DF	Nenê	31 March 1976 (aged 24)	21	6	(Brazilian Football Confederation) Associação Portuguesa de Desportos
3	DF	Juliana	3 October 1981 (aged 18)	10	0	(Brazilian Football Confederation) São Paulo FC
4	DF	Mônica	4 April 1978 (aged 22)	9	0	(Brazilian Football Confederation) São Paulo FC
5	MF	Daniela	12 January 1984 (aged 16)	6	0	(Brazilian Football Confederation) Associação Portuguesa de Desportos
6	DF	Tânia	3 October 1974 (aged 25)	29	13	(Brazilian Football Confederation) São Paulo FC
7	MF	Formiga	3 March 1978 (aged 22)	21	4	(Brazilian Football Confederation) São Paulo FC
8	MF	Cidinha	6 October 1976 (aged 23)	15	5	(Brazilian Football Confederation) Vasco da Gama
9	FW	Kátia	18 February 1977 (aged 23)	21	19	(Brazilian Football Confederation) São Paulo FC
10	MF	Sissi (captain)	2 June 1967 (aged 33)	35	41	(Brazilian Football Confederation) Vasco da Gama
11	FW	Roseli	7 September 1969 (aged 31)	26	36	(Brazilian Football Confederation) Vasco da Gama
12	FW	Pretinha	19 May 1975 (aged 25)	27	30	(Brazilian Football Confederation) Vasco da Gama
13	FW	Maycon	30 April 1977 (aged 23)	14	7	(Brazilian Football Confederation) Associação Portuguesa de Desportos
14	MF	Raquel	10 May 1978 (aged 22)	9	3	(Brazilian Football Confederation) São Paulo FC
15	DF	Simone	10 February 1981 (aged 19)	5	0	(Brazilian Football Confederation) São Paulo FC
16	DF	Rosana	7 July 1982 (aged 18)	8	0	(Brazilian Football Confederation) São Paulo FC
17	MF	Suzana	12 October 1973 (aged 26)	12	5	(Brazilian Football Confederation) Vasco da Gama
18	GK	Maravilha	10 April 1973 (aged 27)	16	0	(Brazilian Football Confederation) Associação Portuguesa de Desportos

Unenrolled alternate players
No.	Pos.	Player	Date of birth (age)	Caps	Goals	Club
19	MF	Marisa	10 August 1966 (aged 34)			
20	GK	Mayla	25 August 1982 (aged 18)			
21	FW	Grazielle	28 March 1981 (aged 19)			
22	FW	Nilda	25 March 1972 (aged 28)			

=== Germany ===
Head coach: Tina Theune-Meyer

Germany named a squad of 18 players and 4 alternates for the tournament.

No.	Pos.	Player	Date of birth (age)	Caps	Goals	Club
1	GK	Silke Rottenberg	25 January 1972 (aged 28)			(German Football Association) FFC Brauweiler Pulheim
2	DF	Kerstin Stegemann	29 September 1977 (aged 22)			(German Football Association) FFC Flaesheim-Hillen
3	DF	Jeannette Götte	13 March 1979 (aged 21)			(German Football Association) FFC Flaesheim-Hillen
4	DF	Steffi Jones	22 December 1972 (aged 27)			(German Football Association) 1. FFC Frankfurt
5	DF	Doris Fitschen (captain)	25 October 1968 (aged 31)			(German Football Association) 1. FFC Frankfurt
6	FW	Maren Meinert	5 August 1973 (aged 27)			(German Football Association) FFC Brauweiler Pulheim
7	FW	Claudia Müller	21 May 1974 (aged 26)			(German Football Association) WSV Wolfsburg-Wendschott
8	MF	Nicole Brandebusemeyer	9 October 1974 (aged 25)			(German Football Association) FFC Brauweiler Pulheim
9	FW	Birgit Prinz	25 October 1977 (aged 22)			(German Football Association) 1. FFC Frankfurt
10	MF	Bettina Wiegmann	7 October 1971 (aged 28)			(German Football Association) FFC Brauweiler Pulheim
11	FW	Inka Grings	31 October 1978 (aged 21)			(German Football Association) FCR 2001 Duisburg
12	DF	Stefanie Gottschlich	5 August 1978 (aged 22)			(German Football Association) WSV Wolfsburg-Wendschott
13	DF	Sandra Minnert	7 April 1973 (aged 27)			(German Football Association) 1. FFC Frankfurt
14	DF	Tina Wunderlich	10 October 1977 (aged 22)			(German Football Association) 1. FFC Frankfurt
15	MF	Ariane Hingst	25 July 1979 (aged 21)			(German Football Association) 1. FFC Turbine Potsdam
16	MF	Renate Lingor	11 October 1975 (aged 24)			(German Football Association) 1. FFC Frankfurt
17	MF	Melanie Hoffmann	29 November 1974 (aged 25)			(German Football Association) FCR 2001 Duisburg
18	GK	Nadine Angerer	10 November 1978 (aged 21)			(German Football Association) Bayern Munich

Unenrolled alternate players
No.	Pos.	Player	Date of birth (age)	Caps	Goals	Club
19	MF	Sandra Smisek	3 July 1977 (aged 23)			(German Football Association) FCR 2001 Duisburg
20	DF	Martina Müller	18 April 1980 (aged 20)			(German Football Association) SC 07 Bad Neuenahr
21	MF	Pia Wunderlich	26 January 1975 (aged 25)			(German Football Association) 1. FFC Frankfurt
22	GK	Andrea Schaller	14 September 1976 (aged 23)			(German Football Association) SC 07 Bad Neuenahr

=== Sweden ===
Head coach: Marika Domanski-Lyfors

Sweden named a squad of 18 players and 4 alternates for the tournament.

No.	Pos.	Player	Date of birth (age)	Caps	Goals	Club
1	GK	Caroline Jönsson	22 November 1977 (aged 22)	10	0	
2	DF	Karolina Westberg	16 May 1978 (aged 22)	44	0	
3	DF	Jane Törnqvist	9 May 1975 (aged 25)	54	7	
4	DF	Sara Larsson	13 May 1979 (aged 21)	1	0	
5	DF	Kristin Bengtsson	12 January 1970 (aged 30)	95	8	
6	FW	Malin Moström	1 August 1975 (aged 25)	27	5	
7	DF	Cecilia Sandell	10 June 1968 (aged 32)	56	2	
8	FW	Tina Nordlund	19 March 1977 (aged 23)	24	4	
9	MF	Malin Andersson (captain)	4 May 1973 (aged 27)	86	24	
10	MF	Hanna Ljungberg	8 January 1979 (aged 21)	48	12	
11	FW	Victoria Svensson	18 May 1977 (aged 23)	46	16	
12	DF	Hanna Marklund	26 November 1977 (aged 22)	24	0	
13	DF	Sara Call	16 July 1977 (aged 23)	18	1	
14	FW	Sara Johansson	23 January 1980 (aged 20)	1	0	
15	MF	Linda Fagerström	17 March 1977 (aged 23)	32	3	
16	MF	Malin Swedberg	15 September 1968 (aged 31)	76	9	
17	MF	Therese Sjögran	8 April 1977 (aged 23)	16	1	
18	GK	Ulrika Karlsson	14 October 1970 (aged 29)	43	0	

Unenrolled alternate players
No.	Pos.	Player	Date of birth (age)	Caps	Goals	Club
19	DF	Åsa Lönnqvist	14 April 1970 (aged 30)	76	1	
20	MF	Elin Flyborg	5 January 1976 (aged 24)	7	1	
21	DF	Jessika Sundh	9 July 1974 (aged 26)	13	1	
22	GK	Ulla-Karin Thelin	19 February 1977 (aged 23)	5	0	

== Group F ==
=== China PR ===
Head coach: Ma Yuanan

China PR named a squad of 18 players and 2 alternates for the tournament.

No.	Pos.	Player	Date of birth (age)	Caps	Goals	Club
1	GK	Han Wenxia	23 August 1976 (aged 24)			
2	DF	Wang Liping	12 November 1973 (aged 26)			
3	DF	Fan Yunjie	29 April 1972 (aged 28)			
4	DF	Bai Jie	28 March 1972 (aged 28)			
5	DF	Xie Huilin	17 January 1975 (aged 25)			
6	MF	Zhao Lihong	25 December 1972 (aged 27)			
7	MF	Shui Qingxia	18 December 1966 (aged 33)			
8	FW	Jin Yan	27 July 1972 (aged 28)			
9	FW	Sun Wen (captain)	6 April 1973 (aged 27)			
10	MF	Liu Ailing	2 May 1967 (aged 33)			
11	MF	Pu Wei	20 August 1980 (aged 20)			
12	DF	Wen Lirong	2 October 1969 (aged 30)			
13	MF	Liu Ying	11 June 1974 (aged 26)			
14	MF	Pan Lina	18 July 1977 (aged 23)			
15	MF	Qiu Haiyan	17 June 1974 (aged 26)			
16	MF	Zhu Jing	2 March 1978 (aged 22)			
17	FW	Zhang Ouying	2 November 1975 (aged 24)			
18	GK	Gao Hong	27 November 1967 (aged 32)			

Unenrolled alternate players
No.	Pos.	Player	Date of birth (age)	Caps	Goals	Club
19	DF	Fan Chunling	2 February 1972 (aged 28)			
22	GK	Bai Lifang	5 January 1978 (aged 22)			

=== Nigeria ===
Head coach: Mabo Ismaila

Nigeria named a squad of 18 players and 4 alternates for the tournament.

No.	Pos.	Player	Date of birth (age)	Caps	Goals	Club
1	GK	Ann Chiejine	2 February 1974 (aged 26)			
2	DF	Yinka Kudaisi	25 August 1975 (aged 25)			
3	MF	Martha Tarhemba	1 April 1978 (aged 22)			
4	DF	Perpetua Nkwocha	3 January 1976 (aged 24)			
5	DF	Eberechi Opara	6 March 1976 (aged 24)			
6	DF	Florence Ajayi	28 April 1977 (aged 23)			
7	FW	Stella Mbachu	16 April 1978 (aged 22)			
8	FW	Rita Nwadike	3 November 1974 (aged 25)			
9	MF	Gloria Usieta	19 June 1977 (aged 23)			
10	MF	Mercy Akide	26 August 1975 (aged 25)			
11	FW	Ifeanyi Chiejine	17 May 1983 (aged 17)			
12	FW	Patience Avre	10 June 1976 (aged 24)			
13	MF	Nkiru Okosieme	1 March 1972 (aged 28)			
14	MF	Florence Omagbemi (captain)	2 February 1975 (aged 25)			
15	MF	Maureen Mmadu	7 May 1975 (aged 25)			
16	DF	Florence Iweta	29 March 1983 (aged 17)			
17	FW	Nkechi Egbe	5 February 1978 (aged 22)			
18	GK	Judith Chime	20 May 1978 (aged 22)			

Unenrolled alternate players
No.	Pos.	Player	Date of birth (age)	Caps	Goals	Club
19	FW	Lami Adamu	20 January 1979 (aged 21)			
20	FW	Adaku Okoroafor	18 November 1974 (aged 25)			
21	DF	Vivian Nkemakolam	24 May 1976 (aged 24)			
22	GK	Precious Dede	18 January 1980 (aged 20)			

=== Norway ===
Head coach: Per-Mathias Høgmo

Norway named a squad of 18 players and 4 alternates for the tournament. During the tournament, Bente Kvitland replaced Anne Tønnessen due to injury.

No.	Pos.	Player	Date of birth (age)	Caps	Goals	Club
1	GK	Bente Nordby	23 July 1974 (aged 26)			(Norwegian Football Federation) Athene Moss
2	DF	Brit Sandaune	5 June 1972 (aged 28)			(Norwegian Football Federation) SK Trondheims-Ørn
3	DF	Gøril Kringen (captain)	28 January 1972 (aged 28)			(Norwegian Football Federation) SK Trondheims-Ørn
4	DF	Anne Tønnessen	18 March 1974 (aged 26)			(Norwegian Football Federation) Kolbotn IL
5	DF	Gro Espeseth	30 October 1972 (aged 27)			(Norwegian Football Federation) SK Trondheims-Ørn
6	MF	Hege Riise	18 July 1969 (aged 31)			(Norwegian Football Federation) Asker Fotball
7	MF	Solveig Gulbrandsen	12 January 1981 (aged 19)			(Norwegian Football Federation) Kolbotn IL
8	MF	Monica Knudsen	25 March 1975 (aged 25)			(Norwegian Football Federation) Asker Fotball
9	MF	Anita Rapp	24 July 1977 (aged 23)			(Norwegian Football Federation) Asker Fotball
10	MF	Unni Lehn	7 June 1977 (aged 23)			(Norwegian Football Federation) SK Trondheims-Ørn
11	FW	Marianne Pettersen	12 April 1975 (aged 25)			(Norwegian Football Federation) Athene Moss
12	DF	Silje Jørgensen	5 May 1977 (aged 23)			(Norwegian Football Federation) Klepp IL
13	DF	Kristin Bekkevold	19 April 1977 (aged 23)			(Norwegian Football Federation) Asker Fotball
14	MF	Dagny Mellgren	19 June 1978 (aged 22)			(Norwegian Football Federation) Arna-Bjørnar
15	MF	Margunn Haugenes	25 January 1970 (aged 30)			(Norwegian Football Federation) Arna-Bjørnar
16	FW	Ragnhild Gulbrandsen	22 February 1977 (aged 23)			(Norwegian Football Federation) SK Trondheims-Ørn
17	MF	Christine Bøe Jensen	3 June 1975 (aged 25)			(Norwegian Football Federation) IK Grand Bodø
18	GK	Ingeborg Hovland	3 October 1969 (aged 30)			(Norwegian Football Federation) Klepp IL
19	DF	Bente Kvitland	23 June 1974 (aged 26)			(Norwegian Football Federation) SK Trondheims-Ørn

Unenrolled alternate players
No.	Pos.	Player	Date of birth (age)	Caps	Goals	Club
20	DF	Anne Bugge-Paulsen	29 June 1979 (aged 21)			(Norwegian Football Federation) Arna-Bjørnar
21	FW	Kjersti Thun	18 June 1974 (aged 26)			(Norwegian Football Federation) Asker Fotball
22	GK	Astrid Johannessen	10 January 1978 (aged 22)			(Norwegian Football Federation) Arna-Bjørnar

=== United States ===
Head coach: April Heinrichs

The United States named a squad of 18 players and 4 alternates for the tournament.

No.	Pos.	Player	Date of birth (age)	Caps	Goals	Club
1	GK	Briana Scurry	7 September 1971 (aged 29)			
2	MF	Lorrie Fair	5 August 1978 (aged 22)			
3	DF	Christie Pearce	24 June 1975 (aged 25)			
4	DF	Carla Overbeck	9 May 1968 (aged 32)			
5	MF	Nikki Serlenga	20 June 1978 (aged 22)			
6	DF	Brandi Chastain	21 July 1968 (aged 32)			
7	MF	Sara Whalen	28 April 1976 (aged 24)			
8	MF	Shannon MacMillan	7 October 1974 (aged 25)			
9	FW	Mia Hamm	17 March 1972 (aged 28)			
10	DF	Michelle French	27 January 1977 (aged 23)			
11	MF	Julie Foudy (captain)	23 January 1971 (aged 29)			
12	FW	Cindy Parlow	8 May 1978 (aged 22)			
13	MF	Kristine Lilly	22 July 1971 (aged 29)			
14	DF	Joy Fawcett	8 February 1968 (aged 32)			(United States Soccer Federation) Ajax
15	DF	Kate Sobrero	23 August 1976 (aged 24)			
16	FW	Tiffeny Milbrett	23 October 1972 (aged 27)			
17	DF	Danielle Slaton	10 June 1980 (aged 20)			
18	GK	Siri Mullinix	22 May 1978 (aged 22)			(United States Soccer Federation) Raleigh Wings

Unenrolled alternate players
No.	Pos.	Player	Date of birth (age)	Caps	Goals	Club
19	MF	Aly Wagner	10 August 1980 (aged 20)			
20	DF	Susan Bush	10 November 1980 (aged 19)			
21	FW	Christie Welsh	27 February 1981 (aged 19)			
22	GK	Jenni Branam	8 October 1980 (aged 19)			(United States Soccer Federation) Charlotte Eagles
