= Ehikhamenor =

Ehikhamenor is a surname. Notable people with the surname include:

- Ehinomen Ehikhamenor (born 1980), Nigerian boxer
- Victor Ehikhamenor, Nigerian visual artist
