= Nigeria at the 2000 Summer Olympics =

- IOC code: NGR
- NOC: Nigeria Olympic Committee
- Website: www.nigeriaolympiccommittee.org

in Sydney
- Competitors: 83 (44 men and 39 women) in 8 sports
- Flag bearer: Sunday Bada
- Medals Ranked 41st: Gold 1 Silver 2 Bronze 0 Total 3

Summer Olympics appearances (overview)
- 1952; 1956; 1960; 1964; 1968; 1972; 1976; 1980; 1984; 1988; 1992; 1996; 2000; 2004; 2008; 2012; 2016; 2020; 2024

Nigeria competed at the 2000 Summer Olympics in Sydney, Australia.

== Medalists ==
Medal	Name	Sport	Event	Date
Gold	Nduka Awazie; Fidelis Gadzama; Clement Chukwu; Jude Monye; Sunday Bada; Enefiok Udo-Obong	Athletics	Men's 4×400 metres relay	30 September
Silver	Ruth Ogbeifo	Weightlifting	Women's 75 kg	20 September
Silver	Glory Alozie	Athletics	Women's 100 metres hurdles	27 September

== Competitors ==
The following is the list of number of competitors in the Games.

Sport	Men	Women	Total
Athletics	14	14	28
Boxing	5	–	5
Football	17	15	32
Judo	1	1	2
Swimming	1	1	2
Table tennis	3	4	7
Weightlifting	1	4	5
Wrestling	2	–	2
Total	44	39	83

== Athletics ==
Key

- Note–Ranks given for track events are within the athlete's heat only
- Q = Qualified for the next round
- q = Qualified for the next round as a fastest loser or, in field events, by position without achieving the qualifying target
- NR = National record
- N/A = Round not applicable for the event
- Bye = Athlete not required to compete in round

Men
Track and road events

Athletes	Events	Heat Round 1		Heat Round 2		Semifinal		Final	
Athletes	Events	Time	Rank	Time	Rank	Time	Rank	Time	Rank
Deji Aliu	100 metres	10.35	20 Q	10.29	15 Q	10.32	12	Did not advance	
Sunday Emmanuel	100 metres	10.31	10 Q	10.36	16 Q	10.45	14	Did not advance	
Seun Ogunkoya	100 metres	10.72	71	Did not advance					
Uchenna Emedolu	200 metres	20.87	25 Q	20.93	29	Did not advance			
Francis Obikwelu	200 metres	20.76	17 Q	20.33	12 Q	20.71	15	Did not advance	
Nduka Awazie	400 metres	46.81	52	Did not advance					
Sunday Bada	400 metres	45.75	21 q	45.83	27	Did not advance			
Jude Monye	400 metres	45.79	22 Q	46.32	32	Did not advance			
Sylvester Omodiale	400 metres hurdles	51.06	41	—N/a		Did not advance			
Uchenna Emedolu; Nnamdi Lucky Anusim; Sunday Emmanuel; Deji Aliu	4 × 100 metres relay	38.85	8 q	—N/a		Did not finish		Did not advance	
Clement Chukwu; Jude Monye; Sunday Bada; Enefiok Udo-Obong; Nduka Awazie; Fidelis Gadzama	4 × 400 metres relay	3:01.20	1 Q	—N/a		3:01.06	6 Q	2:58.68	1st place, gold medalist(s)

Field events

Athlete	Event	Qualification		Final	
Athlete	Event	Distance	Position	Distance	Position
Chima Ugwu	Shot put	19.11	21	Did not advance	
Chima Ugwu	Discus throw	Did not start		Did not advance	

Women
Track and road events

Athletes	Events	Heat Round 1		Heat Round 2		Semifinal		Final	
Athletes	Events	Time	Rank	Time	Rank	Time	Rank	Time	Rank
Joan Uduak Ekah	100 metres	11.60	32 Q	11.67	30	Did not advance			
Mercy Nku	100 metres	11.41	21 Q	11.26	14 Q	11.56	16	Did not advance	
Mary Onyali	100 metres	11.36	18 Q	11.40	20	Did not advance			
Mercy Nku	200 metres	23.14	16 Q	22.95	11 Q	23.40	14	Did not advance	
Mary Onyali	200 metres	22.90	9 Q	23.03	18	Did not advance			
Fatima Yusuf	200 metres	23.21	21 q	23.21	22	Did not advance			
Bisi Afolabi	400 metres	51.61	2 Q	51.87	20	Did not advance			
Falilat Ogunkoya	400 metres	51.88	14 Q	50.49	2 Q	50.18	3 Q	50.12	7
Charity Opara	400 metres	51.77	10 Q	51.04	17	Did not advance			
Glory Alozie	100 metres hurdles	12.84	5 Q	12.84	7 Q	12.68	1 Q	12.68	2nd place, silver medalist(s)
Angela Atede	100 metres hurdles	13.09	16 Q	13.11	17	Did not advance			
Glory Alozie; Benedicta Ajudua; Mercy Nku; Mary Onyali	4 × 100 metres relay	43.28	9 Q	—N/a		42.82	5 Q	44.05	7
Bisi Afolabi; Charity Opara; Rosemary Okafor; Falilat Ogunkoya; Doris Jacob	4 × 400 metres relay	3:22.99	1 Q	—N/a				3:23.80	4

Field events

Athlete	Event	Qualification		Final	
Athlete	Event	Distance	Position	Distance	Position
Pat Itanyi	Long jump	6.33	25	Did not advance	
Vivian Chukwuemeka	Shot put	17.47	14	Did not advance	

== Boxing ==
Men

Athlete	Event	Round of 32	Round of 16	Quarterfinals	Semifinals	Final	
Athlete	Event	Opposition Result	Opposition Result	Opposition Result	Opposition Result	Opposition Result	Rank
Olusegun Ajose	Light welterweight	Nourian (IRI); W Walkover	Williams, Jr. (USA); L RSC–R4	Did not advance			
Eromosele Albert	Middleweight	Bye	Gaydarbekov (RUS); L 9–15	Did not advance			
Jegbefumere Albert	Light heavyweight	Bye	Amos-Ross (CAN); W RSC–R3	Kraj (CZE); L 7–8	Did not advance		
Rasmus Ojemaye	Heavyweight	—N/a	Savón (CUB); L RSC–R2	Did not advance			
Samuel Peter	Super heavyweight	—N/a	Onofrei (ROU); W 17–14	Vidoz (ITA); L 3–14	Did not advance		

== Football ==
=== Men's tournament ===
Team roster

Head coach: (Netherlands) Jo Bonfrere

No.	Pos.	Player	Date of birth (age)	Caps	Club
1	GK	Greg Etafia	30 September 1982 (aged 17)		(Nigeria) Lobi Stars
2	DF	Gbenga Okunowo	1 March 1979 (aged 21)		(Spain) Barcelona
3	DF	Celestine Babayaro	29 August 1978 (aged 22)		(England) Chelsea
4	FW	Johnson Sunday	10 January 1981 (aged 19)		(Nigeria) Kwara United
5	DF	Iyenemi Furo	17 July 1978 (aged 22)		(Belgium) Royal Antwerp
6	DF	Christopher Kanu	4 December 1979 (aged 20)		(Netherlands) Ajax
7	FW	Victor Agali	29 December 1978 (aged 21)		(Germany) Hansa Rostock
8	FW	Bright Igbinadolor	16 December 1980 (aged 19)		(Spain) Sporting Gijón
9	FW	Yakubu	22 November 1982 (aged 17)		(Israel) Maccabi Haifa
10	MF	Azubike Oliseh	18 November 1978 (aged 21)		(Netherlands) Utrecht
11	MF	Garba Lawal*	22 May 1974 (aged 26)		(Netherlands) Roda JC
12	MF	Henry Onwuzuruike	26 December 1979 (aged 20)		(Germany) Greuther Fürth
13	FW	Pius Ikedia	11 July 1980 (aged 20)		(Netherlands) Ajax
14	MF	Blessing Kaku	5 March 1978 (aged 22)		(Belgium) Genk
15	DF	Godwin Okpara*	20 September 1972 (aged 27)		(France) Paris Saint-Germain
16	DF	Isaac Okoronkwo	1 May 1978 (aged 22)		(Ukraine) Shakhtar Donetsk
17	FW	Julius Aghahowa	12 February 1982 (aged 18)		(Tunisia) Espérance
18	GK	Sam Okoye	1 May 1980 (aged 20)		(Nigeria) Enugu Rangers

- Stand-by players

No.	Pos.	Player	Date of birth (age)	Caps	Club
19	DF	Chikelue Iloenyosi	13 October 1980 (aged 19)		(Germany) Tennis Borussia Berlin
20	MF	Henry Isaac	14 February 1980 (aged 20)		(Germany) Eintracht Frankfurt
22	GK	Ettah Ijoh	14 November 1978 (aged 21)		(Egypt) Al-Mahala

Group play

Team	Pld	W	D	L	GF	GA	GD	Pts
Italy	3	2	1	0	5	2	+3	7
Nigeria	3	1	2	0	7	6	+1	5
Honduras	3	1	1	1	6	7	−1	4
Australia	3	0	0	3	3	6	−3	0

13 September 2000
18:30

Nigeria	3–3	Honduras
Igbinadolor 50'; Agali 78'; Yakubu 90+1'	Report	Suazo 36', 76'; León 60'

Hindmarsh Stadium, Adelaide
Attendance: 13,386
Referee: Ľuboš Micheľ (Slovakia)

16 September 2000
20:00

Australia	2–3	Nigeria
Foxe 41'; Wehrman 44'	Report	Ikedia 16'; Aghahowa 22'; Agali 64'

Sydney Football Stadium, Sydney
Attendance: 38,080
Referee: Carlos Simon (Brazil)

19 September 2000
18:30

Italy	1–1	Nigeria
Okunowo 65' (o.g.)	Report	Lawal 40'

Hindmarsh Stadium, Adelaide
Attendance: 18,340
Referee: Felipe Ramos (Mexico)

Quarterfinal

23 September 2000
20:00

Chile	4–1	Nigeria
Contreras 17'; Zamorano 18'; Navia 42'; Tello 65'	Report	Agali 76'

Melbourne Cricket Ground, Melbourne
Attendance: 44,425
Referee: Saad Mane (Kuwait)

=== Women's tournament ===
Team roster

Head coach: Mabo Ismaila

Nigeria named a squad of 18 players and 4 alternates for the tournament.

No.	Pos.	Player	Date of birth (age)	Caps	Goals	Club
1	GK	Ann Chiejine	2 February 1974 (aged 26)			
2	DF	Yinka Kudaisi	25 August 1975 (aged 25)			
3	MF	Martha Tarhemba	1 April 1978 (aged 22)			
4	DF	Perpetua Nkwocha	3 January 1976 (aged 24)			
5	DF	Eberechi Opara	6 March 1976 (aged 24)			
6	DF	Florence Ajayi	28 April 1977 (aged 23)			
7	FW	Stella Mbachu	16 April 1978 (aged 22)			
8	FW	Rita Nwadike	3 November 1974 (aged 25)			
9	MF	Gloria Usieta	19 June 1977 (aged 23)			
10	MF	Mercy Akide	26 August 1975 (aged 25)			
11	FW	Ifeanyi Chiejine	17 May 1983 (aged 17)			
12	FW	Patience Avre	10 June 1976 (aged 24)			
13	MF	Nkiru Okosieme	1 March 1972 (aged 28)			
14	MF	Florence Omagbemi (captain)	2 February 1975 (aged 25)			
15	MF	Maureen Mmadu	7 May 1975 (aged 25)			
16	DF	Florence Iweta	29 March 1983 (aged 17)			
17	FW	Nkechi Egbe	5 February 1978 (aged 22)			
18	GK	Judith Chime	20 May 1978 (aged 22)			

Unenrolled alternate players
No.	Pos.	Player	Date of birth (age)	Caps	Goals	Club
19	FW	Lami Adamu	20 January 1979 (aged 21)			
20	FW	Adaku Okoroafor	18 November 1974 (aged 25)			
21	DF	Vivian Nkemakolam	24 May 1976 (aged 24)			
22	GK	Precious Dede	18 January 1980 (aged 20)			

Group play

Team	Pld	W	D	L	GF	GA	GD	Pts
United States	3	2	1	0	6	2	+4	7
Norway	3	2	0	1	5	4	+1	6
China	3	1	1	1	5	4	+1	4
Nigeria	3	0	0	3	3	9	−6	0

14 September 2000
17:30

China	3–1	Nigeria
Zhao 12'; Sun 57', 83'	Report	Nkwocha (85>pen.)

Bruce Stadium, Canberra
Attendance: 16,000
Referee: Martha Toro (Colombia)

17 September 2000
17:30

Norway	3–1	Nigeria
Mellgren 22'; Riise 62' (pen.); Pettersen 90'	Report	Akide 78'

Bruce Stadium, Canberra
Attendance: 9,150
Referee: Tammy Ogston (Australia)

20 September 2000
17:30

United States	3–1	Nigeria
Chastain 26'; Lilly 35'; MacMillan 56'	Report	Akide 48'

Melbourne Cricket Ground, Melbourne
Attendance: 9,000
Referee: Im Eun Ju (South Korea)

== Judo ==
Men

Athlete	Event	Round of 64	Round of 32	Round of 16	Quarterfinals	Semifinals	Repechage 1	Repechage 2	Repechage 3	Final / BM	
Athlete	Event	Opposition Result	Opposition Result	Opposition Result	Opposition Result	Opposition Result	Opposition Result	Opposition Result	Opposition Result	Opposition Result	Rank
Majemite Omagbaluwaje	−81 kg	Slyfield (NZL); L	Did not advance								

Women

Athlete	Event	Round of 32	Round of 16	Quarterfinals	Semifinals	Repechage 1	Repechage 2	Repechage 3	Final / BM	
Athlete	Event	Opposition Result	Opposition Result	Opposition Result	Opposition Result	Opposition Result	Opposition Result	Opposition Result	Opposition Result	Rank
Bilkisu Yusuf	−63 kg	Rodríguez (CUB); L	Did not advance							

== Swimming ==
Men

Athlete	Event	Heat		Semifinal		Final	
Athlete	Event	Time	Rank	Time	Rank	Time	Rank
Gentle Offoin	100 m freestyle	52.91	60	Did not advance			

Women

Athlete	Event	Heat		Semifinal		Final	
Athlete	Event	Time	Rank	Time	Rank	Time	Rank
Ngozi Monu	50 m freestyle	28.20	57	Did not advance			

== Table Tennis ==
Men

Athlete	Event	Qualification round	Group stage			Round of 32	Round of 16	Quarterfinals	Semifinals	Final / BM
Athlete	Event	Opposition Result	Opposition Result	Rank	Opposition Result	Opposition Result	Opposition Result	Opposition Result	Opposition Result	Rank
Peter Akinlabi	Singles	—N/a	Grujić (YUG); L 0–3	Lee (KOR); L 0–3	3	Did not advance				
Segun Toriola	Singles	—N/a	Huang (CAN); L 2–3	Sosa (CUB); W 3–1	2	Did not advance				
Kazeem Nosiru; Segun Toriola	Doubles	Bye	Heister / Keen (NED); L 1–2	Baboor / Subramanyan (IND); W 2–1	2	—N/a	Did not advance			

Women

Athlete	Event	Qualification round	Group stage			Round of 32	Round of 16	Quarterfinals	Semifinals	Final / BM
Athlete	Event	Opposition Result	Opposition Result	Rank	Opposition Result	Opposition Result	Opposition Result	Opposition Result	Opposition Result	Rank
Bose Kaffo	Singles	—N/a	Bátorfi (HUN); L 0–3	Reed (USA); L 0–3	3	Did not advance				
Funke Oshonaike	Singles	—N/a	Sakata (JPN); L 2–3	Miao (AUS); L 0–3	3	Did not advance				
Bose Kaffo; Funke Oshonaike	Doubles	Bye	Aganović / Boroš (CRO); L 0–2	Tsui / Yu (TPE); L 0–2	3	—N/a	Did not advance			
Atisi Owoh; Kehinde Okenla	Doubles	Pérez / Ramos (VEN); W 2–0	Bădescu / Steff (ROU); L 0–2	Kushch / Melnik (RUS); L 0–2	3	—N/a	Did not advance			

== Weightlifting ==
Men

Athlete	Event	Snatch		Clean & Jerk		Total	
Athlete	Event	Weight	Rank	Weight	Rank	Weight	Rank
Sunday Mathias	–62 kg	115.0	17	150.0	=14	265.0	15

Women

Athlete	Event	Snatch		Clean & Jerk		Total	
Athlete	Event	Weight	Rank	Weight	Rank	Weight	Rank
Franca Gbodo	–53 kg	85.0	=4	110.0	=4	195.0	4
Evelyn Ebhomien	–58 kg	92.5	=3	No lift		Did not finish	
Ruth Ogbeifo	–75 kg	105.0	=4	140.0 OR	1	245.0	2nd place, silver medalist(s)
Helen Idahosa	+75 kg	110.0	=7	140.0	5	250.0	5

== Wrestling ==
Freestyle

Athlete	Event	Elimination pool				Quarterfinals	Semifinals	Final / BM	
Athlete	Event	Opposition Result	Opposition Result	Opposition Result	Rank	Opposition Result	Opposition Result	Opposition Result	Rank
Ibo Oziti	69 kg	McIlravy (USA); L 1–2	Şanlı (TUR); L 0–6	—N/a	3	Did not advance			
Victor Kodei	97 kg	Xanthopoulos (GRE); L 1–4	Torchinava (NED); L 3–14	—N/a	2	Did not advance			

== See also ==
- Nigeria at the 1998 Commonwealth Games
- Nigeria at the 2002 Commonwealth Games
