= Rico Hoye =

American boxer (born 1974)

Personal information
- Nationality: American
- Born: Rico Hoye; November 9, 1974 (age 51) Monroe, Michigan, U.S.
- Height: 6 ft 3 in (191 cm)
- Weight: Cruiserweight

Boxing career
- Reach: 76 in (193 cm)
- Stance: Orthodox

Boxing record
- Total fights: 28
- Wins: 24
- Win by KO: 16
- Losses: 4
- Draws: 0

Rico Hoye (born November 9, 1974) is an American former professional boxer who competed in the Cruiserweight division. He resides in Phoenix, Arizona, and is a former number one ranked light heavyweight contender (IBF) and a former world title challenger in the light heavyweight division. Hoye was a Cruiserweight division contestant in the fourth season of the Contender, boxing three 5-round bouts and one 8-round bout on Versus, winning three.

== Early life and professional career ==
Hoye was raised in Monroe, Michigan and Detroit, Michigan. His father, Bobby Hoye (1951–1996) was a professional super middleweight contender. Rico was raised by his grandfather Robert Hoye (1930–1999) a United States Army and Golden Gloves middleweight boxer. Both his father and grandfather brought him to the gym as an infant and he first competed at 7 years old. As a teenager, he was trained by his grandfather, and he was able to amass a 68–12 amateur record, including junior Olympic titles and Golden Gloves titles in Toledo and Detroit, and was hopeful for an opportunity to make the 1992 Olympic team. At that time, however, his grandfather was injured and wasn't able to train him and he strayed from the sport and became involved in street activity around his Detroit neighborhood. In a 1992 altercation at 17 years old, he shot and killed someone and spent 9 years in prison. While in prison, both his father and grandfather died. Upon his release from prison, he immediately began seriously training and was soon back in the ring competing.

Hoye made his professional debut in June 2001 with a third round stoppage of Omar Pucci in Michigan. Over the next two years, Hoye scored twelve consecutive wins. He won the vacant IBA Continental Light Heavyweight title by decisioning Prince Badi Ajamu over 12 rounds in June 2003.

== Defenses and challenges ==
Hoye made three defenses of his IBA regional title. He defeated Etienne Whitaker in October 2003, Donnell Wiggins in March 2004, and Montell Griffin in September 2004 in a bout which was also an International Boxing Federation eliminator for a world title shot.

In March 2005, the 18–0 Hoye traveled to England to challenge Clinton Woods for the vacant IBF title, losing on a fifth-round technical knockout. In May 2007, Hoye challenged unbeaten Romanian boxer Adrian Diaconu for the WBC International light heavyweight title, an eliminator for the full WBC world title, but lost when the fight was stopped in the 3rd round.

== Contender ==
In late 2008, Hoye moved up to the cruiserweight division to compete in the fourth season of the boxing reality show, The Contender.

Hoye defeated Mike Alexander and Joell Godfrey by decision in separate five round bouts. In the semifinal, Hoye lost by unanimous decision to Ehinomen Ehikhamenor of Nigeria. In February 2009, Hoye defeated Akinyemi Laleye by 8 round unanimous decision to win third place in the televised competition.

== Return from retirement ==
Hoye, who lived in Los Angeles and then Phoenix, Arizona, with his wife and children, operated a boxing and fitness gym in Phoenix during his four years of inactivity, working with clients on physical conditioning, including training such professional athletes as baseball player Troy O'Leary and football running back Marcel Shipp. Hoye has also sparred with heavyweights Wladimir Klitschko and Chris Arreola.

Hoye returned to the ring on November 2, 2013, at heavyweight with a 1st-round TKO of Brandon Winner and then lost by unanimous decision to cruiserweight contender Lucasz Janik in Poland on June 28, 2014.

== Professional boxing record ==
24 Wins (16 knockouts, 8 decisions), 4 Losses (2 knockouts, 2 decisions)
| Result | Record | Opponent | Type | Round | Date | Location | Notes |
| Loss | 26-2 | (Poland) Łukasz Janik | UD | 10 | 06/28/2014 | Hala na Podpromiu, Rzeszów, Poland | |
| Win | 3-8 | (United States) Brandon Winner | TKO | 1 | 11/02/2013 | (United States) Potawatomi Bingo Casino, Milwaukee | comeback at heavyweight after 4 year and 9 month layoff |
| Win | 12-2 | (Nigeria) Akinyemi Laleye | UD | 8 | 02/25/2009 | (United States) Foxwoods, Mashantucket, Connecticut | Contender Season 4 3rd Place Fight. 79-72, 79-72, 79-72. |
| Loss | 14-3 | (Nigeria) Ehinomen Ehikhamenor | UD | 5 | 02/18/2009 | (Singapore) | 45-50, 47-48, 46-49. |
| Win | 9-1-1 | (United States) Joell Godfrey | UD | 5 | 02/11/2009 | (Singapore) | 50-44, 49-45, 48-46. |
| Win | 12-2 | (United States) Mike Alexander | UD | 5 | 01/12/2009 | (Singapore) | 49-46, 48-47, 49-46. |
| Loss | 23-0 | (Romania) Adrian Diaconu | TKO | 3 | 05/09/2007 | (Canada) Studio Mel's, Montreal | WBC International/TAB Light Heavyweight Titles. WBC World Light Heavyweight Title Eliminator. Referee stopped the bout at 0:32 of the third round. |
| Win | 17-6-1 | (United States) Sam "Punching Policeman" Hill | TKO | 10 | 11/10/2006 | (United States) Quiet Cannon, Montebello, California | Referee stopped the bout at 2:15 of the tenth round. |
| Win | 23-23-3 | (United States) Derrick Whitley | UD | 6 | 12/10/2005 | (United States) Mohegan Sun, Uncasville, Connecticut | 59-55, 59-55, 60-54. |
| Loss | 36-3-1 | (United Kingdom) Clinton Woods | TKO | 5 | 03/04/2005 | (United Kingdom) Magna Centre, Rotherham, Yorkshire | IBF World Light Heavyweight Title. Referee stopped the bout at 2:59 of the fifth round. |
| Win | 46-4 | (United States) Montell Griffin | SD | 12 | 09/16/2004 | (United States) Kewadin Casino, Sault Sainte Marie, Michigan | IBA Continental Light Heavyweight Title. IBF World Light Heavyweight Title Eliminator. 116-112, 113-115, 116-112. |
| Win | 27-4 | (Jamaica) Richard Hall | KO | 4 | 15 May 2004 | (United States) Mandalay Bay, Las Vegas | IBF World Light Heavyweight Title Eliminator. Hall knocked out at 1:10 of the fourth round. |
| Win | 20-3-2 | (United States) Donnell Wiggins | TKO | 1 | 03/18/2004 | (United States) Chumash Casino, Santa Ynez, California | WBO NABO/WBC Continental Americas/IBA Continental Light Heavyweight Titles. Referee stopped the bout at 2:38 of the first round. |
| Win | 15-58-3 | (United States) Marris Virgil | KO | 1 | 12/12/2003 | (United States) Ford Community Center, Dearborn, Michigan | Virgil knocked out at 1:12 of the first round. |
| Win | 29-10-2 | (United States) Etianne Whitaker | TKO | 2 | 10/11/2003 | (United States) The Palace of Auburn Hills, Auburn Hills, Michigan | WBO NABO/IBA Continental Light Heavyweight Titles. Referee stopped the bout at 1:22 of the second round. |
| Win | 15-0-1 | (United States) Prince Badi Ajamu | UD | 12 | 06/05/2003 | (United States) State Theatre, Detroit | IBA Continental Light Heavyweight Title. 118-109, 117-110, 118-109. |
| Win | 10-16-3 | (United States) Tyrone Muex | TKO | 3 | 04/24/2003 | (United States) Grand Casino Gulfport, Gulfport, Mississippi | Referee stopped the bout at 1:22 of the third round. |
| Win | 19-9-2 | (Ecuador) Segundo Mercado | TKO | 1 | 01/29/2003 | (United States) Andiamo's Banquet Center, Warren, Michigan | Referee stopped the bout at 2:16 of the first round. |
| Win | 5-1-1 | (United States) Ayodeji Fadeyi | TKO | 1 | 11/02/2002 | (United States) The Palace of Auburn Hills, Auburn Hills, Michigan | Referee stopped the bout at 1:47 of the first round. |
| Win | 18-8-2 | (United States) "Mr. Everything" Greg Wright | UD | 8 | 09/27/2002 | (United States) The Palace of Auburn Hills, Auburn Hills, Michigan | |
| Win | 11-5-2 | (United States) George Klinesmith | TKO | 2 | 06/08/2002 | (United States) Pyramid Arena, Memphis, Tennessee | Referee stopped the bout at 1:40 of the second round. |
| Win | 15-34-2 | (United States) Ruben Ruiz | TKO | 2 | 04/19/2002 | (United States) Auburn Hills, Michigan | |
| Win | 32-38 | (United States) Kenny Snow | UD | 6 | 01/31/2002 | (United States) The Roostertail, Detroit | |
| Win | 1-12 | (United States) Conley Person | KO | 1 | 01/22/2002 | (United States) Andiamo's Banquet Center, Detroit | Person knocked out at 1:21 of the first round. |
| Win | 1-5-2 | (United States) Vidal Middlebrook | TKO | 1 | 12/21/2001 | (United States) Youngstown, Ohio | |
| Win | 13-46-3 | (United States) Marris Virgil | KO | 2 | 11/23/2001 | (United States) The Palace of Auburn Hills, Auburn Hills, Michigan | Virgil knocked out at 1:09 of the second round. |
| Win | 3-3-1 | (United States) Percel Banks | TKO | 3 | 08/10/2001 | (United States) Cobo Hall, Detroit | Referee stopped the bout at 2:59 of the third round. |
| Win | 3-0 | (United States) Omar Pucci | TKO | 3 | 06/20/2001 | (United States) Andiamo's Banquet Center, Warren, Michigan | Referee stopped the bout at 2:59 of the third round. |
