= Mugadza =

Mugadza is a Zimbabwean surname. Notable people with the surname include:

- Misheck Mugadza, Zimbabwean politician
- Rosemary Mugadza, Zimbabwean footballer
- Taps Mugadza, Zimbabwean soul and pop singer
