= Eberechi =

- Gender: Unisex
- Language: Igbo

Origin
- Word/name: Igboland
- Meaning: Chi's mercy

Eberechi // is an Igbo given name that means “chi's mercy”. It is unisex but mostly used for girls.

== Names ==
Notable people with the name include:

- Eberechi Eze (born 1998), English footballer
- Eberechi Opara (born 1976), Nigerian footballer
- Eberechi Wike (born 1972), Nigerian judge
