= The Contender season 4 =

The Contender
- Season 4
- No. of episodes: 5

Release
- Original network: Versus
- Original release: December 3, 2008 – January 7, 2009

Season chronology
- ← Previous; Season 3 Next → Season 5

The fourth season of The Contender was recorded in Singapore (with the exception of the live finale), and premiered on Versus on December 3, 2008. The show was on its third network, with the first season being broadcast on NBC and second and third seasons being shown on ESPN.

== Contestants ==
The following 16 fighters, hailing from around the globe, were selected to take part in the fourth Contender Tournament which took place in the cruiserweight division.

Records entering tournament in parentheses (W-L-D)

Contestant	Record
Mike Alexander	(12-2-0)
Felix Cora Jr.	(18-2-2)
Ryan Coyne	(9-0-0)
Ehinomen Ehikhamenor	(12-3-0)
Deon Elam	(9-0-0)
Alfredo Escalera Jr.	(15-1-1)
Tim Flamos	(20-4-1)
Richard Gingras	(8-0-0)
Joell Godfrey	(9-0-1)
Rico Hoye	(20-2-0)
Akinyemi Laleye	(10-1-0)
Troy Ross	(17-1-0)
Jon Schneider	(7-2-1)
Lawrence Tauasa	(30-5-1)
Erick Vega	(8-2-1)
Darnell Wilson	(23-7-3)

== Trainers ==
- Tommy Brooks
- John Bray

== Emcee for the series ==
- Perry Cale - Australia (During tournament)
- John Vena - USA (Finale)

== Fight results ==
Episode 1

- Felix Cora Jr. defeats Joell Godfrey by unanimous decision.
  - 50-45 | 50-45 | 49-46
  - Blue Team 1, Gold Team 0

Episode 2

- Alfredo Escalera Jr. defeats Jon Schneider by unanimous decision.
  - 49-45 | 50-44 | 49-45
  - Blue Team 2, Gold Team 0

Episode 3

- Akinyemi Laleye defeats Erick Vega by unanimous decision.
  - 50-46 | 49-46 | 49-46
  - Blue Team 2, Gold Team 1

Episode 4

- Deon Elam defeats Richard Gingras by unanimous decision.
  - 50-45 | 49-46 | 48-47
  - Blue Team 2, Gold Team 2

Episode 5

- Ehinomen Ehikhamenor defeats Darnell Wilson by unanimous decision.
  - 50-44 | 50-45 | 50-44
  - Gold Team 3, Blue Team 2

Episode 6

- Troy Ross defeats Lawrence Tauasa by TKO (referee stoppage) in round two.
  - Gold Team 4, Blue Team 2

Episode 7

- Rico Hoye defeats Mike Alexander by unanimous decision.
  - 49-46 | 48-47 | 49-46
  - Gold Team 5, Blue Team 2
- Ryan Coyne defeats Tim Flamos by split decision.
  - 49-46 | 47-48 | 48-47
  - Gold Team 5, Blue Team 3

Episode 8

- Quarterfinal 1
  - Troy Ross defeats Felix Cora Jr. by TKO (referee stoppage) in round one.
  - Time: 2:38

Episode 9

- Quarterfinal 2
  - Akinyemi Laleye defeats Alfredo Escalera Jr. by KO in round five.
  - Time: 1:51

Episode 10

- Quarterfinal 3
  - Ehinomen Ehikhamenor defeats Deon Elam by unanimous decision.
  - 49-46 | 49-46 | 49-46
- Quarterfinal 4
  - Rico Hoye defeats Joell Godfrey by unanimous decision.
  - 50-44 | 49-45 | 48-46
  - Hoye was originally scheduled to fight Ryan Coyne, but due to the severity of Coyne's cut that he sustained in his fight with Tim Flamos, he was unable to continue in the Contender Season 4 tournament. He was replaced by Joell Godfrey, who was invited back to the tournament to fight Rico.

Episode 11

- Semifinal 1
  - Troy Ross defeats Akinyemi Laleye by unanimous decision.
  - 50-45 | 50-45 | 50-45
  - In preparation for the fight, as per the Gold Team's ritual, Laleye spells out "gorilla warfare" on the whiteboard in his locker room. In actuality, the term is "guerilla warfare".
- Semifinal 2
  - Ehinomen Ehikhamenor defeats Rico Hoye by unanimous decision.
  - 50-45 | 48-47 | 49-46

Live finale at the MGM Foxwoods Casino in Connecticut

- February 25, 2009
- Contender championship bout
  - Troy Ross defeats Ehinomen Ehikhamenor by TKO in round four.
- Third place bout
  - Rico Hoye defeats Akinyemi Laleye by unanimous decision.
  - 79-72 | 79-72 | 79-72
- Other undercard bouts
  - Felix Cora Jr. defeats Tim Flamos by TKO in round three.
  - Ryan Coyne defeats Richard Gingras by unanimous decision.
  - Alfredo Escalera Jr. defeats Erick Vega by TKO in round six.
