= Anne Tønnessen =

Norwegian footballer (born 1974)

Personal information
- Full name: Anne Tønnessen
- Date of birth: 18 March 1974 (age 52)
- Place of birth: Sokndal Municipality, Norway
- Position: Defender

Youth career
- Sokndal
- Eigersund

Senior career*
Years	Team	Apps	(Gls)
- Klepp IL
- Kolbotn IL

International career
1996–2004	Norway	68	(3)
Medal record
Women's football
Representing Norway
Olympic Games
Gold medal – first place	2000 Atlanta	Team competition
- * Club domestic league appearances and goals

Anne Tønnessen (born 18 March 1974) is a Norwegian footballer and Olympic champion.

== Biography ==
Tønnessen was born in Sokndal Municipality on 18 March 1974.

She received a gold medal at the 2000 Summer Olympics in Sydney, playing for the Norwegian team. She played only the two first matches in the Olympics, as she became injured early in the second game against Nigeria, and was replaced by Bente Kvitland for the rest of the Olympics.
