= Prince Badi Ajamu =

American boxer

Personal information
- Nickname: The Boxing Prince
- Nationality: American
- Born: Badi Ajamu; January 24, 1972 Camden, New Jersey United States
- Weight: 175

Boxing career
- Stance: Orthodox

Boxing record
- Total fights: 36
- Wins: 30
- Win by KO: 15
- Losses: 5
- Draws: 1
- No contests: 0

Prince Badi Ajamu (born January 24, 1972, in Camden, New Jersey) — nicknamed the Boxing Prince — is best known for taking a fight against former champion Roy Jones Jr.

== Pro career ==
Ajamu was undefeated until July 5, 2003, when he lost in a unanimous decision to Rico Hoye. He is currently being trained by the legendary trainer Buddy McGirt. Ajamu is best known for fighting Roy Jones Jr. in a fight that took place on July 29, 2006, with Jones winning the fight in a lopsided unanimous decision.

== Comeback ==
Ajamu came back after that loss to Jones on January 19, 2007, to stop Craig Cummings for the Vacant World Boxing Foundation (WBFo) and NBA titles. On July 31, 2009, Ajamu beat DeAndrey Abron by UD for the Vacant NBA Light Heavyweight title.

== Titles Held ==
- Pennsylvania State Light Heavyweight Title
- IBC Intercontinental Light Heavyweight
- WBC Continental Americas Light Heavyweight title
- WBC Caribbean Boxing Federation (CABOFE) Light Heavyweight title
- WBO NABO Light Heavyweight title
- World Boxing Foundation Light Heavyweight title
- NBA Light Heavyweight Title (2 times)

== Professional boxing record ==
30 Wins (15 knockouts, 15 decisions), 5 Losses (5 decisions), 1 Draw
Result	Record	Opponent	Type	Round	Date	Location	Notes
Win	30-5-1	(United States) Anthony Caputo Smith	UD	8	12/01/2018	(United States) PAL Center, Hockessin, Delaware	
Loss	29-5-1	(Puerto Rico) Kenny Cruz Carasquillo	UD	6	08/11/2018	(United States) 2300 Arena, Philadelphia	
Win	29-4-1	(Puerto Rico) Edgar Perez	UD	8	06/01/2018	(United States) The Claridge Hotel, Atlantic City, New Jersey	
Loss	28-4-1	(United States) Willis Lockett	MD	6	03/10/2018	(United States) The Claridge Hotel, Atlantic City, New Jersey	
Win	28-3-1	(Puerto Rico) Edgar Perez	UD	8	08/05/2017	(United States) The Claridge Hotel, Atlantic City, New Jersey	
Win	27-3-1	(United States) DeAndrey Abron	UD	12	07/31/2009	(United States) Resorts Casino Hotel, Atlantic City, New Jersey	
Win	26-3-1	(United States) Craig Cummings	RTD	2	01/29/2007	(United States) Knox Arena, Olive Branch, Mississippi	For NBA and vacant WBFo World Light heavyweight titles. Cummings retired due to an injury.
Loss	25-3-1	(United States) Roy Jones Jr.	UD	12	07/29/2006	(United States) Qwest Arena, Boise, Idaho	Retained WBO NABO Light heavyweight title.
Win	25-2-1	(United States) Galen Brown	TKO	10	01/27/2006	(United States) The Tropicana, Atlantic City, New Jersey	For WBO NABO/WBC Continental Americas Light Heavyweight Titles. Referee stopped the bout at 0:47 of the tenth round.
Win	24-2-1	(United States) Thomas Reid	UD	12	12/03/2005	(United States) Saint Petersburg Municipal Auditorium, Saint Petersburg, Florida	WBC CABOFE Light Heavyweight Title.
Win	23-2-1	(United States) Olando Rivera	TKO	9	10/15/2005	(United States) UCF Arena, Kissimmee, Florida	WBC Continental Americas Light Heavyweight Title. Referee stopped the bout at 1:08 of the ninth round.
Win	22-2-1	(United States) "Mr. Everything" Greg Wright	UD	12	12/09/2004	(United States) Robert Treat Hotel, Newark, New Jersey	WBC Continental Americas Light Heavyweight Title.
Win	21-2-1	(United States) "Fabulous" Fred Moore	TKO	10	07/27/2004	(United States) A La Carte Event Pavilion, Tampa, Florida	Referee stopped the bout at 0:33 of the tenth round.
Win	20-2-1	(United States) Derrick Whitley	MD	10	06/04/2004	(United States) The Blue Horizon, Philadelphia	IBC Intercontinental Light Heavyweight Title.
Loss	19-2-1	(Jamaica) Otis Grant	MD	10	04/24/2004	(Canada) Colisée Pepsi, Quebec City, Quebec	
Win	19-1-1	(United States) "Sting" Ray Berry	TKO	4	01/23/2004	(United States) The Tropicana, Atlantic City, New Jersey	Referee stopped the bout at the end of the fourth round.
Win	18-1-1	(United States) "Sting" Ray Berry	TKO	5	10/25/2003	(United States) Philadelphia Armory, Philadelphia	
Win	17-1-1	(United States) Sam "Punching Policeman" Hill	TKO	6	10/03/2003	(United States) The Blue Horizon, Philadelphia	IBC Intercontinental Light Heavyweight Title.
Win	16-1-1	(United States) Mike Alvarez	TKO	6	08/08/2003	(United States) Philadelphia Armory, Philadelphia	Pennsylvania Light Heavyweight Title.
Loss	15-1-1	(United States) Rico Hoye	UD	12	05/06/2003	(United States) State Theatre, Detroit	IBA Continental Light Heavyweight Title.
Win	15-0-1	(United States) Danny Sheehan	TKO	5	01/16/2003	(United States) Adam's Mark, Philadelphia	Referee stopped the bout at 2:52 of the fifth round.
Draw	14-0-1	(United States) Anthony Bonsante	PTS	8	10/04/2002	(United States) Dover Downs, Dover, Delaware	77-75, 76-76, 76-78.
Win	14-0	(United States) Alton Rice	UD	6	08/09/2002	(United States) The Tropicana, Atlantic City, New Jersey	
Win	13-0	(United States) John Lindsay	TKO	3	06/21/2002	(United States) The Blue Horizon, Philadelphia	
Win	12-0	(United States) Alton Rice	UD	6	05/10/2002	(United States) Dover Downs, Dover, Delaware	
Win	11-0	(United States) Roger Bowden	UD	6	03/22/2002	(United States) Philadelphia	
Win	10-0	(United States) Roderick Knox	UD	6	12/14/2001	(United States) Pennsylvania Convention Center, Philadelphia	
Win	9-0	(United States) Sam Reese	PTS	6	11/10/2001	(United States) Fernwood Resort, Bushkill, Pennsylvania	
Win	8-0	(United States) Robert Marsh	TKO	2	10/13/2001	(United States) The Tropicana, Atlantic City, New Jersey	
Win	7-0	(United States) Roderick Knox	UD	4	09/21/2001	(United States) The Blue Horizon, Philadelphia	
Win	6-0	(United States) Robert Marsh	TKO	5	07/21/2001	(United States) Bally's Park Place, Atlantic City, New Jersey	
Win	5-0	(United States) Chuck Berry	TKO	1	06/15/2001	(United States) The Blue Horizon, Philadelphia	
Win	4-0	(United States) Chet Scott	TKO	4	05/18/2001	(United States) Foxwoods, Mashantucket, Connecticut	
Win	3-0	(Iraq) Naim Al Khafaji	UD	4	03/16/2001	(United States) The Blue Horizon, Philadelphia	
Win	2-0	(Guyana) John Douglas	UD	4	02/21/2001	(United States) The Tropicana, Atlantic City, New Jersey	
Win	1-0	(United States) Lavarius Thompson	TKO	2	12/01/2001	(United States) The Blue Horizon, Philadelphia	
