= Ehinomen Ehikhamenor =

Nigerian boxer

Personal information
- Nicknames: Heknow, Hino
- Nationality: Nigerian
- Born: Hino Ehikhamenor; 1 April 1980 (age 46) Lagos, Nigeria
- Weight: cruiserweight

Boxing career
- Stance: orthodox

Boxing record
- Total fights: 19
- Wins: 15
- Win by KO: 7
- Losses: 4
- Draws: 0
- No contests: 0

Ehinomen Ehikhamenor (born 1 April 1980) is a Nigerian professional boxer who fights in the cruiserweight division.

== Professional career ==
Ehikhamenor turned professional in February 2004 at the Mohegan Sun Casino, Connecticut, U.S.. In his debut Ehikhamenor defeated Moorish American Anthony Riddick by way of a first round knockout.

== Contender ==
Ehinomen was a contestant on the 4th season of The Contender filmed in Singapore. On 7 January 2009 he won his first round fight with a five round points victory over experience Darnell Wilson. After winning two more fights beating Deon Elam in the quarters and Rico Hoye in the semi-final, Ehikhamenor secured a spot in the championship match, in which he will battle Troy Amos-Ross.

Ehikhamenor lost to Troy Ross in The Contender championship bout.

== Personal life ==
Ehikhamenor was raised in LeFrak City apartments in New York City. He attended John Bowne High School.

== Professional boxing record ==
15 Wins (7 knockouts, 8 decisions), 4 Losses (1 knockout, 3 decisions)
Result	Record	Opponent	Type	Round	Date	Location	Notes
Loss	20-1	Troy Ross	TKO	4	25/02/2009	Foxwoods, Mashantucket, Connecticut, U.S.	Referee stopped the bout at 2:00 of the fourth round.
Win	22-2	Rico Hoye	UD	5	18/02/2009	Singapore	
Win	10-0	Deon Elam	UD	5	11/02/2009	Singapore	
Win	23-7-3	Darnell Wilson	UD	5	07/01/2009	Singapore	
Loss	42-4	Herbie Hide	UD	12	30/05/2008	Pabellon Lasesarre, Baracaldo, Spain	WBC International Cruiserweight Title.
Win	14-17-1	Zack Page	UD	6	01/02/2008	Expo Mart, Monroeville, Pennsylvania, U.S.	
Loss	9-1-1	Daniel Stuckey	UD	6	21/10/2005	Mohegan Sun Casino, Uncasville, Connecticut, U.S.	
Loss	9-1	Patrick Nwamu	UD	10	04/08/2005	The Grand Ballroom, New York City, U.S.	New York Cruiserweight Title.
Win	5-9-3	John Douglas	UD	6	09/06/2005	The Grand Ballroom, New York City, U.S.	
Win	3-12-1	Kevin Miller	TKO	2	15/04/2005	The Hoops, Columbus, Ohio, U.S.	Referee stopped the bout at 2:49 of the second round.
Win	4-4-1	Mark Miller	KO	4	18/11/2004	Manhattan Center, New York City, U.S.	Miller knocked out at 2:59 of the fourth round.
Win	6-9-1	Charles Brown	TKO	2	30/09/2004	The Grand Ballroom, New York City, U.S.	Referee stopped the bout at 1:48 of the second round.
Win	12-9-1	John Battle	TKO	3	27/08/2004	Mohegan Sun Casino, Uncasville, Connecticut, U.S.	Referee stopped the bout at 1:48 of the third round.
Win	11-3	Gary Gomez	UD	6	30/07/2004	Mohegan Sun Casino, Uncasville, Connecticut, U.S.	
Win	4-2	Sameh Elashry	UD	4	24/06/2004	Manhattan Center, New York City, U.S.	
Win	3-0	Scott Halton	TKO	1	28/05/2004	Mohegan Sun Casino, Uncasville, Connecticut, U.S.	
Win	2-5	Robert Mosley	UD	4	22/04/2004	The Grand Ballroom, New York City, U.S.	
Win	1-2	Miguel Reyes	TKO	2	19/03/2004	Olympic Theater, New York City, U.S.	
Win	2-10	Anthony Riddick	TKO	1	13/02/2004	Mohegan Sun Casino, Uncasville, Connecticut, U.S.	Referee stopped the bout at 2:36 of the first round.
