= Lawrence Tauasa =

Australian boxer

Personal information
- Nationality: Australian/Samoan
- Born: Lawrence Tauasa; 8 July 1979 (age 47) Apia, Samoa
- Height: 5 ft 9 in (175 cm)
- Weight: Cruiserweight

Boxing career

Boxing record
- Total fights: 46
- Wins: 35
- Win by KO: 23
- Losses: 10
- Draws: 1

Lawrence Tauasa is a Samoan Australian former professional boxer who competes in the cruiserweight division. He comes from Sydney, is a former Australian cruiserweight champion and was a contestant on the fourth season of the Contender.

== Early life ==
Tauasa was born in Samoa but moved to New Zealand when he was 6. He moved to Australia when he was 13.

He made his professional debut in February 1998 with a draw in New South Wales against Glen Fitzpatrick. Over the next few years he made mixed progress scoring a further 8 wins against 2 defeats before challenging Daniel Rowsell for the Australian cruiserweight title in July 2001. It was his first title challenge and it ended with a defeat for Tauasa.

== Australian champion ==
A second attempt for the title was made in February 2003 after three straight wins. The opponent on this occasion was Tosca Petridis and Tauasa picked up the title, this time with a Majority decision. He defended the title only once against former champion Jamie Wallace winning a unanimous decision on that occasion in July 2003.

== Title challenges ==
Tauasa next fought for a title in November 2006 having fought a further eleven times since his victory over Wallace, winning on ten occasions and losing once. In November 2006 he travelled to South Africa to fight Polish heavyweight Albert Sosnowski for the World Boxing Federation (WBF) heavyweight title, losing for the fifth time.

Following the defeat to Sosnowski, Tauasa scored two knockout wins before meeting Jamie Wallace for the second time for the IBF Australasian cruiserweight title in October 2007, winning in the 4th round. In his next fight he travelled to Samoa to win the vacant WBO Oriental cruiserweight title beating Frenchman Charles Baou again in the 4th round. Over the course of his next two fights in 2008 he would make one defence each of both titles.

== Contender ==
Tauasa was a contestant on the 4th series of the boxing reality show, The Contender and fought for the blue team. On 14 January 2009 he suffered his sixth defeat as a professional when he was knocked out of the competition in the first round after suffering a 2nd-round TKO at the hands of Canadian Troy Ross.
