= Banquet hall =

Room for hosting social events

A banquet hall, function hall, or reception hall, is a special purpose room, or a building, used for hosting large social and business events. Typically a banquet hall is capable of serving dozens to hundreds of people a meal in a timely fashion. People and organizations rent them to hold parties, banquets, wedding receptions, memorial services/celebrations of life or other social events. Businesses rent them to hold sales meetings, employee training events, employee awards events, and corporate celebrations and parties.

Banquet halls are often found within pubs, nightclubs, hotels, or restaurants.

The first recorded mention of "function rooms" is in 1922.

They are distinct from other halls, in that they have no religious or government affiliation. Most are run by commercial enterprises, though some banquet halls are run by fraternal organizations and are part of their building, available for rent by the public, for example Masonic Halls.

== Gallery ==
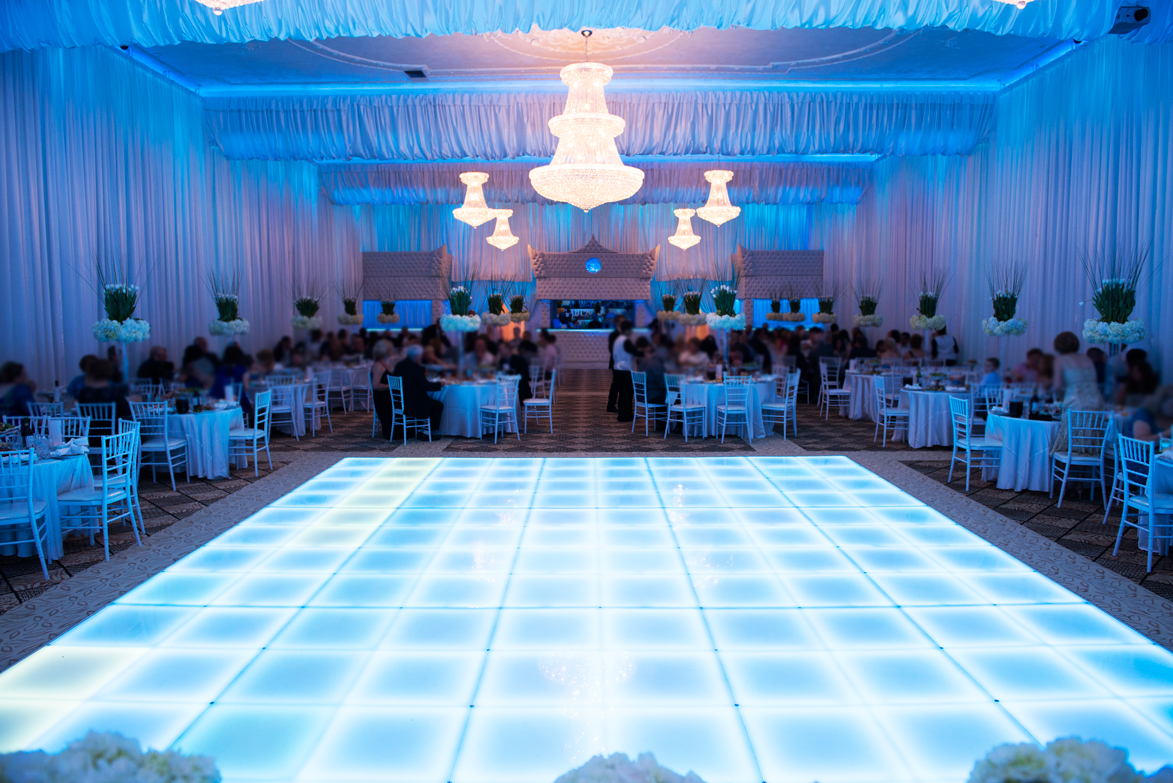
Hotel banquet hall with wedding reception

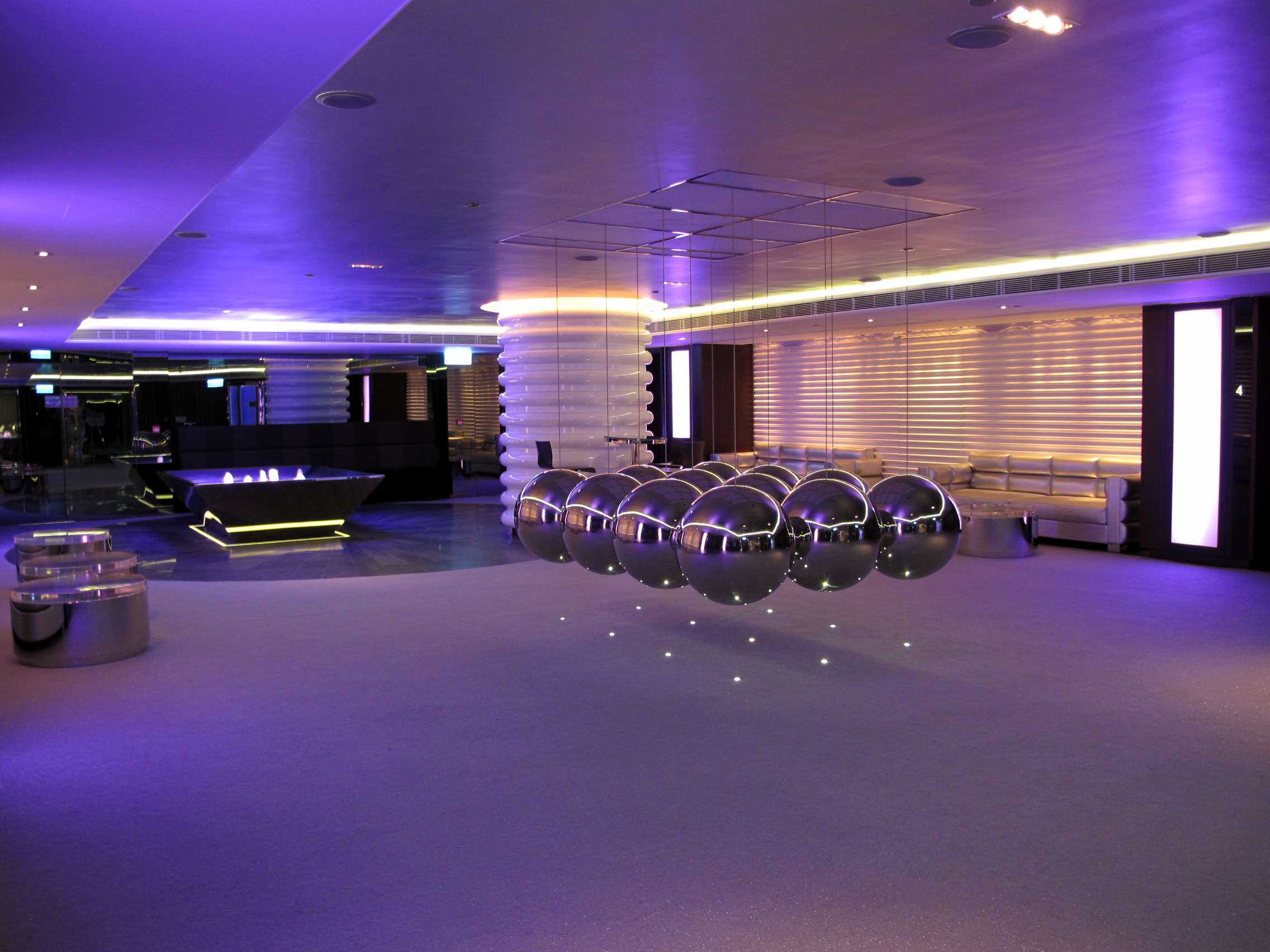
Nightclub banquet hall.

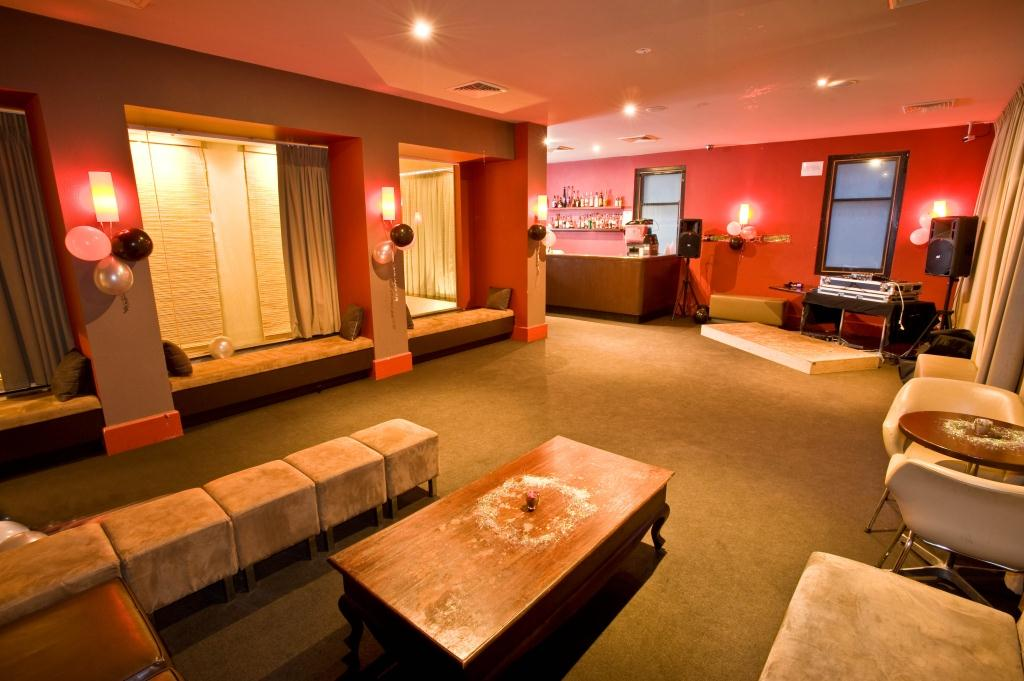
Banquet hall in Melbourne

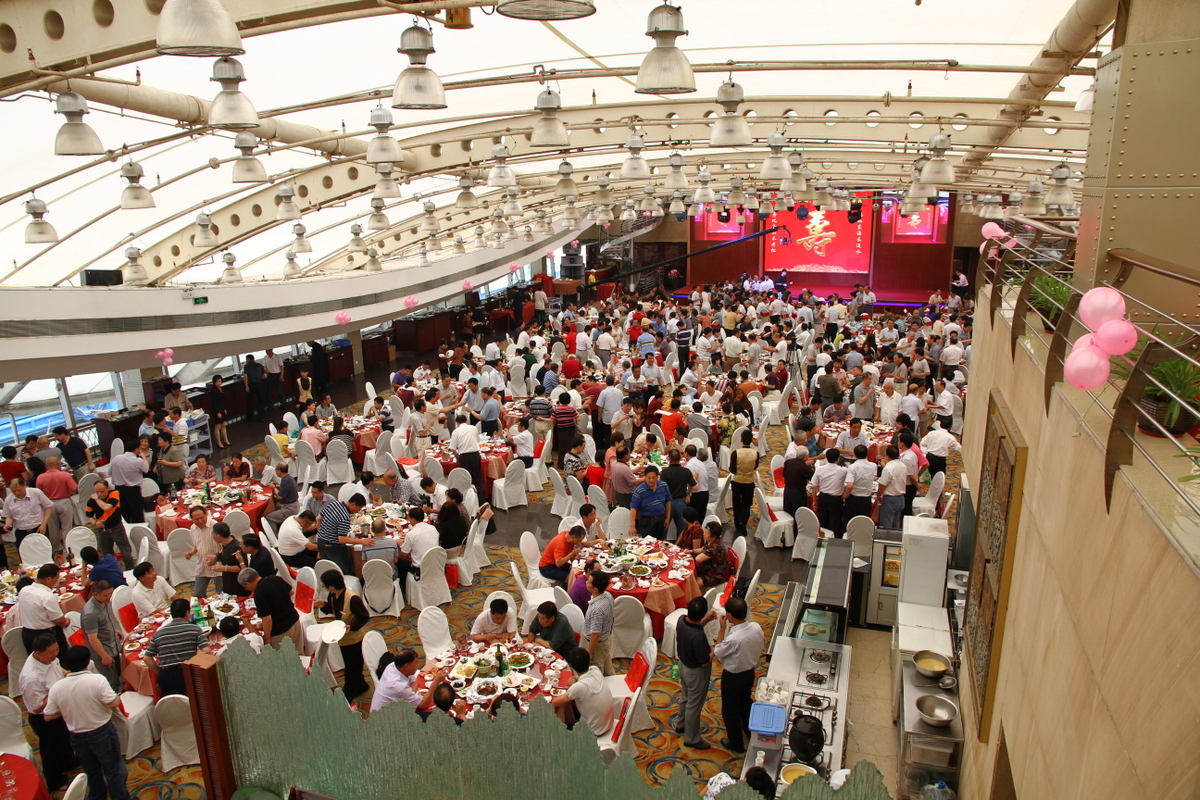
Chinese banquet hall with birthday party

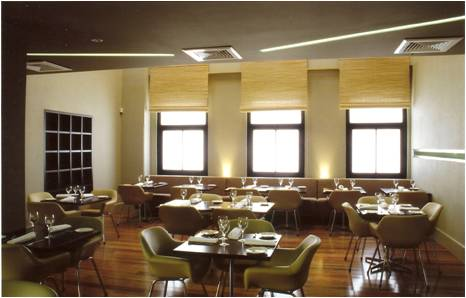
Banquet hall in Brisbane, Australia

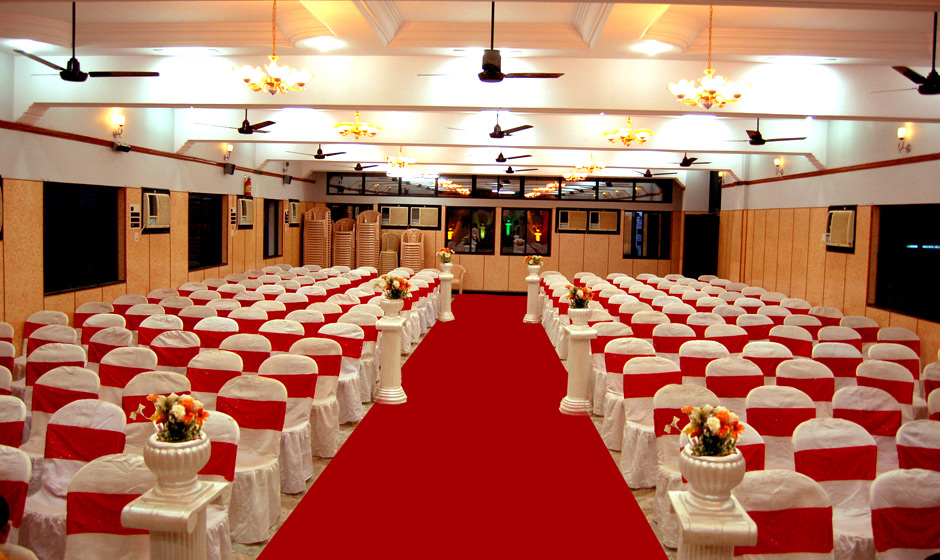
Banquet hall in India

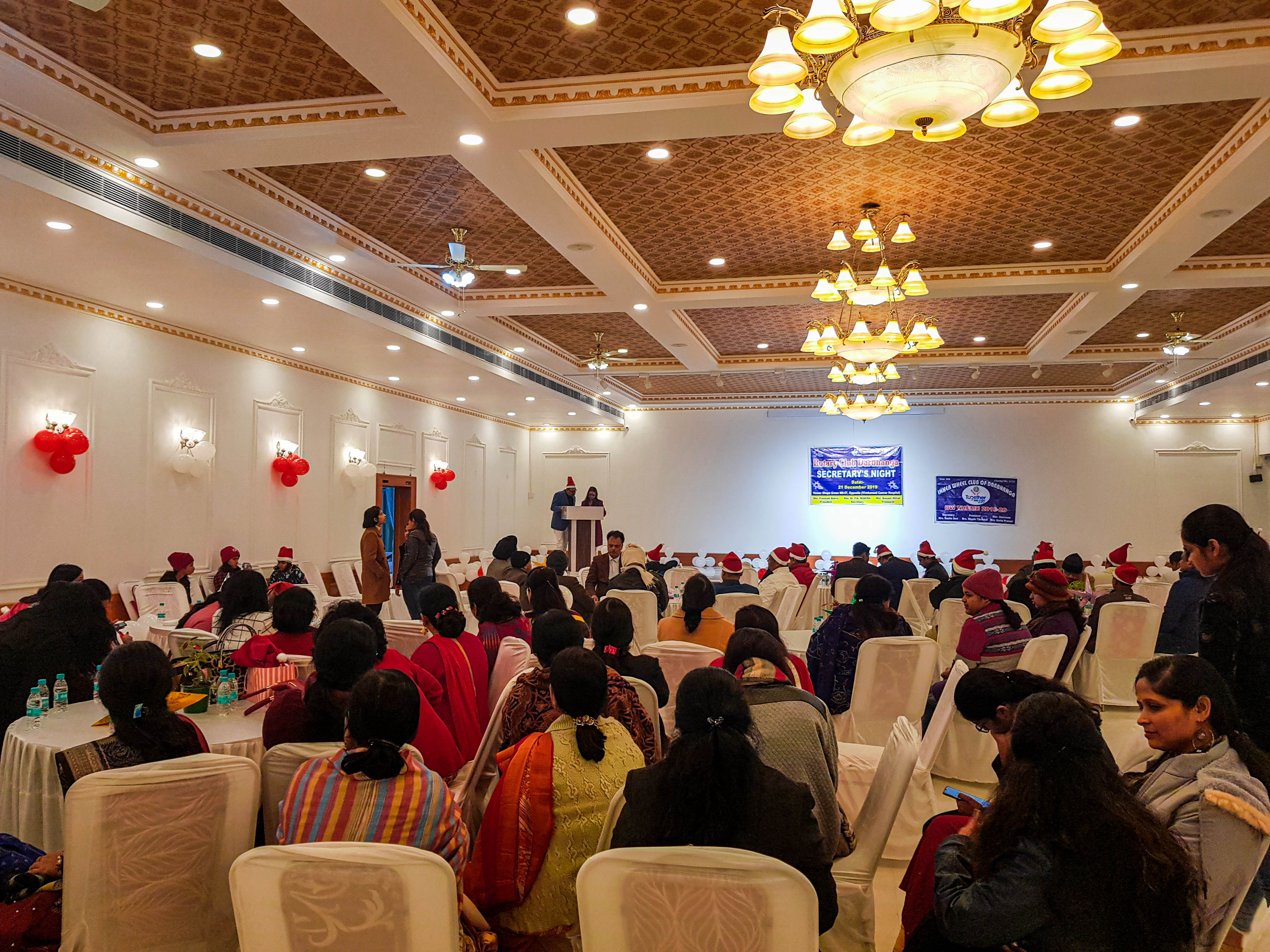
Banquet hall in Darbhanga, Bihar, India
