= Troy Ross =

Canadian boxer (born 1975)

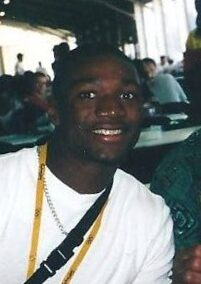
- Troy Ross at the 2000 Summer Olympics

Personal information
- Nickname: The Boss
- Nationality: Canadian
- Born: Troy Amos-Ross; July 17, 1975 (age 51) Georgetown, Guyana
- Height: 5 ft 11 in (180 cm)
- Weight: Cruiserweight; Light Heavyweight

Boxing career
- Reach: 72 in (183 cm)
- Stance: Southpaw

Boxing record
- Total fights: 28
- Wins: 25
- Win by KO: 16
- Losses: 3
Medal record
Commonwealth Games
Silver medal – second place	1998 Kuala Lumpur	Light Heavyweight
Pan American Games
Bronze medal – third place	1999 Winnipeg	Light Heavyweight

Troy Amos-Ross (born July 17, 1975) is a Guyanese-Canadian retired professional boxer. As an amateur, he competed in the light heavyweight division at the 1996 Summer Olympics in Atlanta and 2000 Summer Olympics in Sydney, Australia.

== Personal life ==
He is the son of retired boxer Charles Amos who represented Guyana at the 1968 Summer Olympics and first cousin of Egerton Marcus who won the silver medal for Canada in the Middleweight division at the 1988 Summer Olympics in Seoul, Korea.

== Boxing career ==
In the 1996 Olympics, after having defeated Roland Raforme (Seychelles) and Paul M'Bongo (Cameroon), Ross lost 14–8 in quarterfinals to Kazakhstan's eventual gold medalist Vassili Jirov. Ross entered the 2000 Olympics as a gold medal hopeful, however he was eliminated after a disappointing loss in his first fight with a knockout at the 2nd round by a Nigerian boxer Jegbefumere Albert

Ross turned pro after the 2000 Summer Olympics, however he announced his retirement in 2005 after compiling a record of 13–1, due to the inability to get quality fights. In 2007 he began a comeback and on March 19, 2007, he captured the Commonwealth Cruiserweight title by knocking out John Keeton in the second round.

== The Contender ==
In 2008 Ross joined the cast of the boxing reality TV show The Contender filming in Singapore. He became a member of the gold team and on 14 January 2009 won his first round contest against Australian Lawrence Tauasa. He fought American Felix Cora Jr. in the quarterfinals winning when the fight was stopped after 2:48 of the first round. In the semifinals Troy faced Nigerian Akinyemi Laleye, the fight was scored 50–45 by all three judges in Troy's favor. Troy fought another Nigerian, Ehinomen Ehikhamenor, in the finals on February 25, 2009, at the MGM Grand at Foxwoods Casino in Connecticut. Ross defeated Ehikhamenor by fourth-round TKO to become the Contender champion.

== Acting career ==
Ross has also achieved success out of the ring starting his own fashion line, Ross Wear, and playing roles in movies. He appeared in the 2005 movie Cinderella Man opposite Russell Crowe playing the role of heavyweight boxer John Henry Lewis. Ross also appeared in the 2007 movie Resurrecting the Champ with Josh Hartnett and Samuel L. Jackson, playing the younger version of the champ. He also appears in the movie Phantom Punch, in the role of Heavyweight boxer Floyd Patterson.

== Championships and accomplishments ==
- Commonwealth Boxing Council
  - Commonwealth Cruiserweight Championship (One time)
- Canadian Boxing Federation
  - CBF Cruiserweight Championship (One time)
- The Contender
  - The Contender Season 4 Champion

== Professional record ==
28 fights	25 wins	3 losses
By knockout	16	1
By decision	9	2

No.	Result	Record	Opponent	Method	Round, time	Date	Location	Notes
28	Loss	25–3	(Cuba) Yoan Pablo Hernández	UD	12	Sep 15, 2012	Stechert Arena, Bamberg, Germany	For IBF and The Ring cruiserweight titles
27	Win	25–2	(Poland) Lukasz Rusiewicz	UD	8	Feb 4, 2012	Fraport Arena, Frankfurt, Germany	
26	Win	24–2	(Canada) Carl Handy	UD	10	Oct 30, 2010	(Canada) Casino Rama, Rama, Ontario	
25	Loss	23–2	(United States) Steve Cunningham	TKO	5 (12), 0:01	June 5, 2010	Jahnsportforum, Neubrandenburg, Germany	For vacant IBF cruiserweight title
24	Win	23–1	(Brazil) Daniel Bispo	KO	1 (8), 1:12	Dec 5, 2009	(Canada) Montreal Casino, Montreal	
23	Win	22–1	(United States) Michael Simms	UD	10	June 19, 2009	(Canada) Bell Centre, Montreal	
22	Win	21–1	(Nigeria) Ehinomen Ehikhamenor	TKO	4 (10), 2:00	Feb 25, 2009	(United States) Foxwoods Resort Casino, Mashantucket, Connecticut	Won The Contender season 4 championship.
21	Win	20–1	(Nigeria) Akinyemi Laleye	UD	5	Feb 18, 2009	Singapore	
20	Win	19–1	(United States) Felix Cora Jr.	TKO	1 (5), 2:38	Jan 28, 2009	Singapore	
19	Win	18–1	(Samoa) Lawrence Tauasa	TKO	2 (5)	Jan 14, 2009	Singapore	
18	Win	17–1	(United States) Kendrick Releford	UD	8	May 3, 2008	(Canada) Montreal Casino, Montreal	
17	Win	16–1	(England) Tony Booth	TKO	2 (8), 1:52	May 18, 2007	ExCel Arena, London, England	
16	Win	15–1	(England) John Keeton	KO	2 (12), 2:08	Mar 19, 2007	(Canada) Montreal Casino, Montreal	Won vacant Commonwealth cruiserweight title
15	Win	14–1	(Zimbabwe) Hastings Rasani	TKO	3 (8), 3:05	Jan 20, 2007	Alexandra Palace, Wood Green, England	
14	Win	13–1	(Romania) Claudio Rîșco	TKO	8 (10), 1:25	May 28, 2005	(Canada) Casino Lac Leamy, Hull, Quebec	Won vacant CBF cruiserweight title
13	Loss	12–1	(United States) Willie Herring	SD	8	Mar 5, 2005	(United States) The Venue, Greensboro, North Carolina	
12	Win	12–0	(United States) Etianne Whitaker	KO	2 (8), 1:09	Feb 4, 2005	(Canada) Agricultural Exhibition Hall, Orangeville, Ontario	
11	Win	11–0	(United States) John Battle	TKO	5 (6), 1:26	Jan 8, 2005	(United States) The Venue, Greensboro, North Carolina	
10	Win	10–0	(United States) Caseny Truesdale	TKO	1 (8), 2:24	Dec 11, 2004	(United States) The Venue, Greensboro, North Carolina	
9	Win	9–0	(United States) Robert Marsh	TKO	4 (6), 0:44	Nov 20, 2004	(United States) The Venue, Greensboro, North Carolina	
8	Win	8–0	(United States) Sam Reese	KO	3 (6), 0:38	Jan 31, 2003	(United States) Randy's Ballroom, San Antonio, Texas	
7	Win	7–0	(United States) Norman Jones	UD	6	Aug 6, 2002	(United States) Buchmuller Park, Secaucus, New Jersey	
6	Win	6–0	(United States) Dennis Matthews	KO	2 (6), 1:13	May 24, 2002	(United States) Brady Theater, Tulsa, Oklahoma	
5	Win	5–0	(United States) Dan Sheehan	UD	4	Dec 14, 2001	(United States) Mohegan Sun Casino, Uncasville, Connecticut	
4	Win	4-0	(United States) Will Little	UD	4	Oct 26, 2001	(United States) Sands Casino Hotel, Atlantic City, New Jersey	
3	Win	3–0	(United States) Kip Triplet	TKO	2 (4), 2:40	June 22, 2001	(Canada) Hershey Centre, Mississauga, Ontario	
2	Win	2–0	(United States) Tim Scoggins	TKO	1 (4), 2:12	June 1, 2001	(United States) Sunset Station, San Antonio, Texas	
1	Win	1–0	(United States) Roger Bowden	UD	4	April 20, 2001	(United States) Cintas Center, Cincinnati	

Preceded by Mark Hobson retired	Commonwealth Cruiserweight Champion vacated March 19, 2007 – February 2, 2009	Succeeded by Robert Norton
Preceded by Sakio Bika	The Contender Champion; 2008	Succeeded by Garth Wood
