= Asha Sonko =

Ugandan football player and referee (born 1983)

Personal information
- Full name: Asha Mande Sonko
- Date of birth: 1983 (age 42–43)

Senior career*
Years	Team	Apps	(Gls)
- Kampala United

International career^{‡}
2000	Uganda	3	(0)
- * Club domestic league appearances and goals ‡ National team caps and goals as of 17 November 2000

Asha Mande Sonko (born 1983) is a Ugandan football former player and former referee. She has been a member of the Uganda women's national team.

== Club career ==
Sonko has played for Kampala United in Uganda.

== International career ==
Sonko capped for Uganda at senior level during the 2000 African Women's Championship.
