= Fati Mohammed =

Ghanaian footballer

Personal information
- Date of birth: 4 June 1979 (age 47)
- Position: Goalkeeper

College career
Years	Team	Apps	(Gls)
–2007	Robert Morris Eagles		

International career^{‡}
	Ghana	13	(0)
- ‡ National team caps and goals as of 10 September 2007 (before the 2007 FIFA Women's World Cup)

Fati Mohammed (born 4 June 1979) is a Ghanaian women's international footballer who plays as a goalkeeper. She is a member of the Ghana women's national football team. She was part of the team at the 2003 FIFA Women's World Cup and 2007 FIFA Women's World Cup. On club level she plays for Robert Morris College in United States.
