= Mina Rokbi =

Moroccan footballer

Personal information
- Position: Defender

Senior career*
Years	Team	Apps	(Gls)
- Berrechid

International career^{‡}
2000–2008	Morocco	2+	(0+)
- * Club domestic league appearances and goals ‡ National team caps and goals as of 8 March 2008.

Mina Rokbi (Arabic: أمينة الركبي) is a Moroccan former footballer who played as a defender. She has been a member of the Morocco women's national team.

== Club career ==
Rokbi has played for FC Berrechid in Morocco.

== International career ==
Rokbi capped for Morocco at senior level during the 2000 African Women's Championship.

== Personal life ==
Rokbi is the sister of Saïd Rokbi.

== See also ==
- List of Morocco women's international footballers
