= Patrick Nwamu =

American martial artist

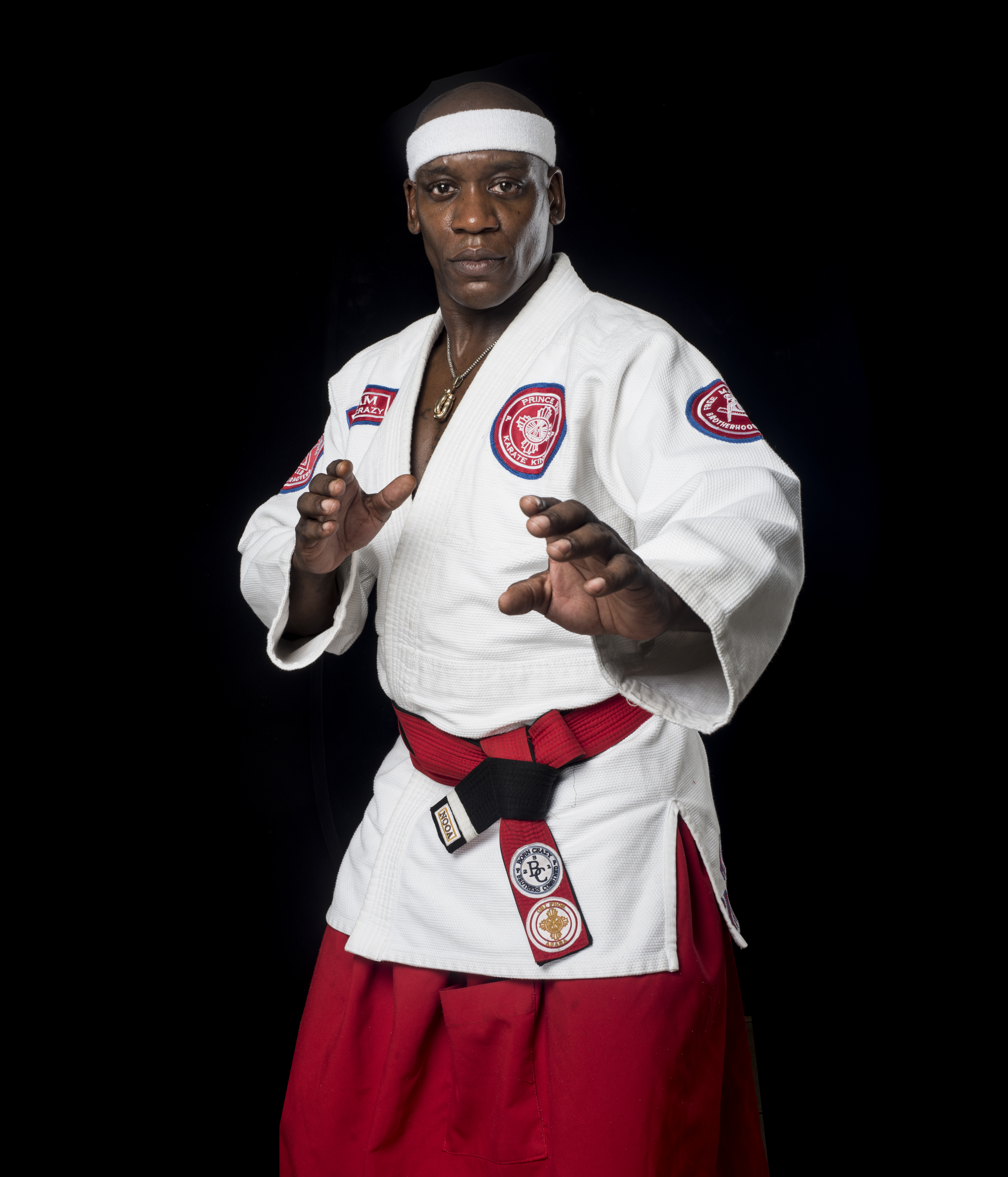
Patrick A. I. Nwamu

Patrick Nwamu (a.k.a. Patrick A. I. Nwamu, born August 10, 1972) is a retired professional fighter, who has held international titles in boxing, kickboxing and Jiu Jitsu. He has also coached and promoted boxing and martial arts, and has collected a small number of acting credits. His parents are members of the Nigerian royal family of Asaba, Nigeria, and Nwamu was given the title of crown warrior prince for his accomplishments in professional fighting and his promotion of Asaba traditions and customs, as well as the creation of Tri Fighting MMA (Kwab-Je).

== Education and amateur boxing career ==
After many years of training in various styles of martial arts, Nwamu was accepted to Georgia Military College in 1998 and began amateur boxing as a student athlete. Nwamu won the 1998 Georgia State Amateur Boxing Championship and the 1998 and 1999 Golden Gloves Heavyweight Championships sanctioned by USA Boxing, representing Georgia and New York, respectively. Failing to advance at the 2000 Olympic boxing West Coast trials, Nwamu left school to begin his professional career.

== Professional fighting career ==
As a professional fighter, Nwamu won four world titles in three different styles of combat within an 11-year span:

- International Boxing Association (IBA) – 2006 Super Cruiserweight World Champion
- International Sport Kickboxing Association (ISKA) – 2011 Super Cruiserweight World Champion
- North American Grappling Association (NAGA) – 2015 Mixed Grappling/Jiu Jitsu Heavyweight World Champion (April 2015)
- North American Grappling Association (NAGA) – 2017 Mixed Grappling/Jiu Jitsu Heavyweight World Champion (April 2017)

Nwamu was the first IBA super-cruiserweight world-champion professional-boxer to win the ISKA full-contact kickboxing world-championship title. He was also the first member of a royal family to win the kickboxing title, in the first kickboxing world-championship fight held in Africa.

== Coaching, promoting and executive career ==
Nwamu has spent many years as a licensed coach at the championship level, teaching in various styles of combat including as a USA Boxing coach (ID# 498812) and a USA Taekwondo (USAT) coach (ID# 999798111).

Nwamu promoted the IBA Super Cruiserweight Pro World Title fight in Madison Square Garden, New York City August 2006. He independently promoted the ISKA Super Cruiserweight Pro Full Contact World Title fight in Asaba, Nigeria January 2011.

His most-significant contribution to martial arts is his creation of Tri Fighting MMA/Kwab-Je, Nigeria's national martial art and freestyle fight sport. In 2011, he was given the title of World Champion Grandmaster by the Intercontinental Union of Kwab-Je which also acts as the Nigerian executive board representing the World Kickboxing and Karate Association (WKA). In 2023, the New York Athletic Commission officially approved Tri-Fighting as a new sport under the amateur MMA umbrella.

In 2022, Nwamu was appointed National Representative of the WKA, as well as National Director of ISKA, for Nigeria.

== Acting and production ==
Nwamu wrote, produced and starred in a biopic about his life, They're Just My Friends (2006). Rosedog Books (Dorrance Publishing) subsequently turned his screenplay into a book.

A long-time member of the Screen Actors Guild, Nwamu has acted in commercials for HBO's Boxing After Dark, Met Life, VOOM and appeared in the Shakira music video "Illegal".

In the episode "The Art of War" of the 2016 HBO miniseries The Night Of, Nwamu helped choreograph the fight scene, in which he played the role of Dante and served as stuntman.

== Family lineage ==
Patrick A. I. Nwamu comes from the royal family of Asaba and descends from a line of asagbas (kings) listed here:

- King Nwani of Asaba – 1870 (great-grand uncle)
- King Okocha Nwokolo of Asaba – 1962 (paternal grandfather)
- King Joseph Chike Edozien of Asaba – 1991 (cousin, mother's side)
- King Patrick Ike Nwamu – 2011 (father)

In 2009, Prince Patrick Nwamu received the title of ogbu ahaba, crown warrior prince of the 'Kingdom of Asaba' by his people for his accomplishments in professional combat and martial arts, and his observance and promotion of Asaba traditions and customs, as well as eze wanta, king of the youths.
