= Bai Lifang =

Chinese footballer

Personal information
- Date of birth: 5 January 1978 (age 48)
- Place of birth: China
- Position: Goalkeeper

International career
Years	Team	Apps	(Gls)
2000	China		

Bai Lifang (born 5 January 1978) is a female Chinese former football goalkeeper. She was part of the China women's national football team at the 2000 Summer Olympics, but did not play.
