= Fama El Foukki =

Moroccan footballer

Senior career*
Years	Team	Apps	(Gls)
- Filles du Boughaz

International career^{‡}
2000	Morocco	3	(0)
- * Club domestic league appearances and goals ‡ National team caps and goals as of 18 November 2000

Fama El Foukki is a Moroccan former footballer. She has captained the Morocco women's national team.

== Club career ==
El Foukki has played for Filles du Boughaz in Morocco.

== International career ==
El Foukki capped for Morocco at senior level during the 2000 African Women's Championship.

== See also ==
- List of Morocco women's international footballers
