= Gloria Usieta =

Nigerian footballer

Personal information
- Date of birth: 19 June 1977 (age 49)
- Place of birth: Nigeria
- Position: Midfielder

International career
Years	Team	Apps	(Gls)
2000	Nigeria		

Gloria Usieta (born 19 June 1977) is a former football midfielder who played for the Nigeria women's national football team at the 1999 Women's World Cup, and the 2000 Summer Olympics.

== See also ==
- Nigeria at the 2000 Summer Olympics
