= Bente Kvitland =

Norwegian footballer (born 1974)

Personal information
- Full name: Bente Kvitland
- Date of birth: 23 June 1974 (age 52)
- Height: 1.70 m (5 ft 7 in)
- Position: Defender

Youth career
- Rissa IL

Senior career*
Years	Team	Apps	(Gls)
1991–1994	Stadsbygd		
1995–1997	Verdal		
1998	Byåsen		
1999–2004	Trondheims-Ørn	99	(3)
2005	Asker	18	(1)

International career^{‡}
1999–2002	Norway	37	(1)
Medal record
Women's football
Representing Norway
Olympic Games
Gold medal – first place	2000 Atlanta	Team
- * Club domestic league appearances and goals as of 17:38, 7 December 2014 (UTC) ‡ National team caps and goals as of 17:38, 7 December 2014 (UTC)

Bente Kvitland (born 23 June 1974) is a Norwegian former footballer who was an Olympic champion with the Norway women's national football team. She played club football in the Toppserien for Trondheims-Ørn and Asker.

Kvitland grew up in Skaugdalen in Rissa Municipality, Norway. In 1991 she began playing club football for Stadsbygd and spent three seasons with Verdal from 1995 until 1997. She played for Trondheims-Ørn from 1999 until 2004, winning the Toppserien and the Norwegian Women's Cup on three occasions each. After winning another Cup with Asker in 2005, Kvitland retired from football to focus on her employment as a prison officer (Norwegian: fengselsbetjent) in Oslo.

In October 1999 Kvitland made her senior national team debut—a 4–0 win in Portugal—but she had not been selected for Norway's 1999 FIFA Women's World Cup squad. In Kvitland's fourth appearance she scored a free kick from 30 metres, the second goal in Norway's 3–0 2001 UEFA Women's Championship qualification win over England at Carrow Road on 7 March 2000.

She collected a total of 37 caps for Norway and was an alternate on the squad that won gold at the 2000 Summer Olympics in Sydney. She played in Norway's UEFA Women's Euro 2001 campaign, which ended with a 1–0 semi-final defeat by hosts Germany in Ulm.

== International appearances ==
As of 7 December 2014.

Norway national team
Year	Apps	Goals
1999	5	0
2000	12	1
2001	13	0
2002	11	0
Total	37	1

== International goals ==
Scores and results list Norway's goal tally first.

#	Date	Venue	Opponent	Result	Competition	Scored
1	7 March 2000	Carrow Road, Norwich	England	3–0	UEFA Euro 2001 Qual.	1
