= Rosemary Mugadza =

Zimbabwean footballer

Rosemary Mugadza is a Zimbabwean football manager and former footballer.

== Early life ==
Mugadza started playing football at a young age with her brothers.

== Career ==
Mugadza has been described as "synonymous with the women's game [in Zimbabwe]". She captained the Zimbabwe women's national football team. Mugadza mainly operates as a defender and was known for her tackling ability.

Mugadza later worked as manager of the Zimbabwe women's national football team.

== Personal life ==
Mugadza has been a Christian. She has five brothers.
