= Judith Chime =

Nigerian former football goalkeeper

Personal information
- Date of birth: 20 May 1978 (age 48)
- Place of birth: Lagos, Nigeria
- Position: Goalkeeper

International career
Years	Team	Apps	(Gls)
2000	Nigeria		

Judith Nneka Chime (born 20 May 1978 in Lagos) is a Nigerian former football goalkeeper. She played for the Nigeria women's national football team at the 1999 FIFA Women's World Cup, and the 2000 Summer Olympics.

== See also ==
- Nigeria at the 2000 Summer Olympics
