= Martha Tarhemba =

Nigerian footballer

Personal information
- Full name: Martha Hembadoon Tarhemba Makir
- Date of birth: 1 April 1978 (age 48)
- Place of birth: Gboko
- Position: Midfielder

Senior career*
Years	Team	Apps	(Gls)
- Benue Queens
- KaKanfo Queens
- Simbiat Abiola Queens
- Jegede Babes
- Pelican Stars

International career
- Nigeria
- * Club domestic league appearances and goals

Martha Tarhemba (born 1 April 1978) is a retired Nigerian professional footballer, who played as a midfielder for the Nigeria women's national team (Super Falcons).

Makir had a diverse football career that spanned several clubs, having featured for the likes of Benue Queens, Kakanfo Queens, Simbiat Abiola Queens, Jegede Babes and Pelican Stars. She also had a commendable outing with the Super Falcons, being part of the 1998 history-making Super Falcons team who won the 1998 African Women's Championship, historically recorded as first Super Falcons international trophy ever. She also featured for the Super Falcons at 1999 FIFA Women's World Cup. Makir was also featured at the 2000 summer Olympics 2000 Summer Olympics.

Despite a promising career, Makir's playing time was curtailed by injury. In 2003, she officially retired from professional football.

After retirement, Makir relocated to the United States to raise her family, though her love for football is still on through the Martha Tarhemba Makir Secondary School Female Football Championship (a tournament aimed at promoting and developing young female football talent in Nigeria).

== Honours ==
Super Falcons

- Winner, African Women's Championship 1998

== See also ==
- Nigeria at the 2000 Summer Olympics
