= Eberechi Opara =

Nigerian footballer

Personal information
- Date of birth: 6 March 1976 (age 50)
- Place of birth: Nigeria
- Position: Defender

International career
Years	Team	Apps	(Gls)
2000	Nigeria		

Eberechi Patience Opara (born 6 March 1976) is a former Nigerian football defender.

She was part of the Nigeria women's national football team at the 1999 FIFA Women's World Cup, and at the 2000 Summer Olympics.

== See also ==
- Nigeria at the 2000 Summer Olympics
