= Denmark women's national football team results (1970–1979) =

This article provides details of international football games played by the Denmark women's national football team from 1974 to 1979. Unofficial matches played in the early 1970s will also be noted. Incomplete

== Results ==
Key
Win
Draw
Defeat

=== 1974 ===
27 July 1974 Nordic Championship	Denmark	1–0	Sweden	Markusböle, Finland
	Stengård (pen.)			Attendance: 800

28 July 1974 Nordic Championship	Denmark	5–0	Finland	Mariehamn, Finland
	Frederiksen; Niemann			Stadium: Mariehamns idrottsparken Attendance: 1,165

=== 1975 ===
26 July 1975 Nordic Championship	Denmark	9–0	Finland	Vejen, Denmark
15:00 UTC+2	Niemann 4', 27', 37'; Nielsen-Mann 20', 40'; Nilsson 29'; Frederiksen 45', 67'; Toftdahl 46'			Stadium: Vejen Stadium; Attendance: 575; Referee: Leif Larsen (Denmark)

27 July 1975 Nordic Championship	Denmark	3–0	Sweden	Vejle, Denmark
14:00 UTC+2	Kramager 10'; Nilsson 18'; Frederiksen 65'			Stadium: Vejle Stadium; Attendance: 1,100; Referee: Poul Jørgen Jensen (Denmark)

=== 1976 ===
9 July 1976 Nordic Championship	Denmark	1–0	Finland	Fristad, Sweden
19:00 UTC+2	Frederiksen	Report		Referee: Bo-Lennart Johansson (Sweden)

11 July 1976 Nordic Championship	Denmark	1–0	Sweden	Borås, Sweden
18:00 UTC+2	Holst 35'	Report		Stadium: Ryavallen; Attendance: 2,000; Referee: Ingemar Johansson (Sweden)

2 October Friendly	Denmark	1–1	Sweden	Roskilde, Denmark
15:30 UTC+2	Barsballe 55'	Report	Sintorn 18'	Stadium: Roskilde Idrætspark; Attendance: 350; Referee: Egard H. Pedersen (Denmark)

=== 1977 ===
9 July 1977 Nordic Championship	Denmark	0–1	Sweden	Mariehamn, Finland
20:00 UTC+3		Report	Lindqvist 10'	Stadium: Mariehamns idrottsparken Attendance: 449; Referee: Anders Mattsson (Sweden)

10 July 1977 Nordic Championship	Denmark	1–0	Finland	Mariehamn, Finland
14:00 UTC+3	Holst 35'	Report		Stadium: Mariehamns idrottsparken Attendance: 0 Referee: Roger Humell (Sweden)

15 October Friendly	Denmark	1–0	Netherlands	Ribe, Denmark
15:00 UTC+2	Smidt Nielsen 29'	Report		Stadium: Ribe Stadium; Attendance: 499; Referee: Henning Lund Sørensen (Denmark)

=== 1978 ===
7 July 1978 Nordic Championship	Denmark	4–0	Finland	Kolding, Denmark
20:00 UTC+2	Smidt Nielsen 8'; Fabrin 11'; Riggelsen 20' (pen.); Holst 70'	Report		Stadium: Kolding Stadium; Attendance: 300; Referee: Ejner Jensen (Denmark)

8 July 1978 Nordic Championship	Denmark	2–0	Norway	Brande, Denmark
16:00 UTC+2	Ehmsen 38'; Pedersen 55'	Report		Stadium: Brande Stadium; Attendance: 200; Referee: Knud Garde (Denmark)

9 July 1978 Nordic Championship	Denmark	0–1	Sweden	Vejle, Denmark
15:00 UTC+2		Report	Erlandsson 5'	Stadium: Vejle Stadium; Attendance: 700; Referee: Henning Lund Sørensen (Denmark)

21 October Friendly	Netherlands	0–3	Denmark	Ruinen, Netherlands
20:00 UTC+2		Report	Fabrin 10', 17'; Ehmsen 63'	Stadium: De Baete Ruinen; Attendance: 2,800; Referee: E. Akse (Netherlands)

=== 1979 ===
19 May Friendly	Denmark	3–1	England	Hvidovre, Denmark
15:00 UTC+2	Barsballe 35'; Holst 45'; Larsen 49'	Report	Pollard 72'	Stadium: Hvidovre Stadium; Attendance: 480; Referee: Jørgen Mortensen (Denmark)

5 July 1979 Nordic Championship	Denmark	1–4	Sweden	Fredrikstad, Norway
18:30 UTC+2	Hindkjær	Report	Söderström 2', 51'; Jansson 21'; Sundhage 61'	Stadium: Lisleby Stadium; Attendance: 700; Referee: Gunnar Larsen (Norway)

6 July 1979 Nordic Championship	Denmark	4–0	Finland	Setskog, Norway
17:30 UTC+2	Mortensen; Ehmsen; Smidt Nielsen	Report		Stadium: Setskog Stadium; Attendance: 1,000; Referee: Ivar Frederiksen (Norway)

8 July 1979 Nordic Championship	Denmark	4–2	Norway	Oslo, Norway
13:00 UTC+2	Niemann 10'; Smidt Nielsen 14'; Mortensen 68'	Report	Kristiansen 5' (pen.); Nyborg 31'; Sværen 33' (o.g.)	Stadium: Bislett Stadium; Attendance: 957; Referee: Jan Erik Olsen (Norway)

18 July 1979 Euros (unofficial)	Denmark	3–1	France	Rimini, Italy
18:00 UTC+2	Niemann; Hindkjær 50'; Holst	Report	Farrugia 25'	Stadium: Stadio Communale; Attendance: 500

22 July 1979 Euros (unofficial)	Scotland	0–2	Denmark	Riccione, Italy
21:30 UTC+2		Report	Hindkjær	Stadium: Stadio Communale

25 July 1979 Euros (unofficial)	Denmark	1–0	Sweden	Rimini, Italy
21:30 UTC+2	Niemann 25'	Report		Attendance: 1,000

28 July 1979 Euros (unofficial)	Denmark	2–0	Italy	Naples, Italy
18:00 UTC+2	Smidt Nielsen 51'; Hindkjær 76'	Report		Stadium: Stadio San Paolo; Attendance: 15,000; Referee: Pancani (Italy)

13 September Friendly	England	2–2	Denmark	Hull, England
18:30 UTC+1	Foreman 43'	Report	Smidt Nielsen 15'; Niemann 39'; Riggelsen 42' (o.g.)	Stadium: Boothferry Park; Attendance: 1,100
