= Denmark women's national football team results =

This article lists the results for the Denmark women's national football team from their first official match against Sweden in 1974 to the present day.

== Results ==
Note that scores are written Denmark first

Key

Abb.	Match
F	Friendly match
NC	Nordic Football Championship match
OG	Olympic Games match
OT	Other tournament(s)

=== 1970s ===
#	Date	Venue	Opponents	Score	Comp	Denmark scorers
1	1974–07–27	Markusböle, Finland	Sweden	1–0	NC	Ann Stengård
2	1974–07–28	Mariehamns idrottsparken, Finland	Finland	5–0	NC	Annette Frederiksen (3), Susanne Niemann (2)
3	1975–07–26	Vejen Stadium, Denmark	Finland	9–0	NC	Susanne Niemann (3), Annette Frederiksen (2), Charlotte Nielsen-Mann (2), Lone Nielsen, Jeanette Toftdahl
4	1975–07–27	Vejle Stadium, Denmark	Sweden	3–0	NC	Bente Jensen Kramager, Annette Frederiksen, Lone Nielsen
5	1976–07–09	Fristad, Sweden	Finland	1–0	NC	Annette Frederiksen
6	1976–07–11	Ryavallen, Sweden	Sweden	1–0	NC	Anne Grete Holst
7	1976–10–02	Roskilde Idrætspark, Denmark	Sweden	1–1	F	Maren Barsballe
8	1977–07–09	Wiklöf Holding Arena, Finland	Sweden	0–1	NC	
9	1977–07–10	Wiklöf Holding Arena, Finland	Finland	1–0	NC	Anne Grete Holst
10	1977–10–15	Ribe Stadium, Denmark	Netherlands	1–0	F	Lone Smidt Nielsen
11	1978–07–07	Kolding Stadium, Denmark	Finland	4–0	NC	Lone Smidt Nielsen, Kirsten Fabrin, Fridel Riggelsen (pen.), Anne Grete Holst
12	1978–07–08	Brande Stadium, Denmark	Norway	2–0	NC	Britta Ehmsen, Inger Pedersen
13	1978–07–09	Vejle Stadium, Denmark	Sweden	0–1	NC	
14	1978–10–21	De Baete Ruinen, Netherlands	Netherlands	3–0	F	Kirsten Fabrin (2), Britta Ehmsen
15	1979–05–19	Hvidovre Stadium, Denmark	England	3–1	F	Maren Barsballe, Anne Grete Holst, Hanne Larsen
16	1979–07–05	Lisleby Stadium, Norway	Sweden	1–4	NC	Inge Hindkjær
17	1979–07–06	Setskog Stadium, Norway	Finland	4–0	NC	Lone Smidt Nielsen (2), Vibeke Mortensen, Britta Ehmsen
18	1979–07–08	Bislett Stadium, Norway	Norway	4–2	NC	Susanne Niemann, Lone Smidt Nielsen, Vibeke Mortensen, Elin Sværen (o.g.)
19	1979–07-18	Stadio Comunale, Rimini, Italy	France	3–1	OT (Note: Denmark win the unofficial 1979 Women's Euro)	Anne Grete Holst, Susanne Niemann, Inge Hindkjær
20	1979–07–22	Stadio Comunale, Riccione, Italy	Scotland	2–0	OT	Inge Hindkjær (2)
21	1979–07–25	Rimini, Italy	Sweden	1–0	OT	Susanne Niemann
22	1979–07–28	Sao Paolo Stadium, Italy	Italy	2–0	OT	Lone Smidt Nielsen, Inge Hindkjær
23	1979–09–13	Boothferry Park, England	England	2–2	F	Lone Smidt Nielsen, Susanne Niemann

=== 1980s ===
#	Date	Venue	Opponents	Score	Comp	Denmark scorers
24	1980–05–10	Stade du Schlossberg, France	France	2–0	F	Anne Grete Holst, Susanne Niemann
25	1980–07–10	Hovåsvallen, Sweden	Norway	4–0	NC	Ann Stengård, Britta Ehmsen, Jette Hansen, Inge Hindkjær
26	1980–07–11	Prästängen, Sweden	Finland	1–1	NC	Susanne Niemann
27	1980–07–13	Nya Ullevi, Sweden	Sweden	2–2	NC	Inge Hindkjær, Anne Grete Holst
28	1980–10–18	Køge Stadium, Denmark	France	4–1	F	Annette Mogensen (2), Lone Smidt Nielsen, Hanne Larsen
29	1981–07–16	Töölön pallokenttä, Finland	Finland	0–0	NC	
30	1981–07–17	Porvoo, Finland	Norway	0–0	NC	
31	1981–07–19	Töölön pallokenttä, Finland	Sweden	1–2	NC	own goal
32	1981–09–06	Kobe Central Football Stadium, Japan	Italy	1–1	OT	Inger Pedersen
33	1981–09–09	Ajinomoto Field Nishigaoka, Japan	England	1–0	OT	Inger Pedersen
34	1982–05–16	Ringsted, Denmark	Italy	6–0	F	Inge Hindkjær (3), Lone Smidt Nielsen (2), Gitte Christensen
35	1982–07–14	Kolding Stadium, Denmark	Norway	1–1	NC	Lone Smidt Nielsen
36	1982–07–16	MCH Arena, Denmark	Finland	1–0	NC	Lone Smidt Nielsen
37	1982–07–18	Vejle Stadium, Denmark	Sweden	2–1	NC	Annie Gam-Pedersen, Lone Smidt Nielsen
38	1982–09–18	Alassio, Italy	Italy	2–0	F	Annette Mogensen, Jette Hansen
39	1982–10–13	Oosterpark Stadium, Netherlands	Netherlands	1–2	EQ	Annette Mogensen
40	1982–11–06	Tårnby Stadium, Denmark	Belgium	1–0	EQ	Charlotte Nielsen-Mann
41	1983–04–30	Delmenhorst Stadium, Germany	West Germany	1–1	EQ	Jette Andersen
42	1983–08–10	Rådavallen Stadium, Sweden	Sweden	1–2	F	Birgitte Frederiksen
43	1983–09–24	Sønderborg Stadium, Denmark	West Germany	1–0	EQ	Lone Smidt Nielsen
44	1983–10–08	King Baudouin Stadium	Belgium	2–2	EQ	Birgitte Frederiksen (2)
45	1983–10–29	Sønderborg Stadium, Denmark	Netherlands	2–0	EQ	Lone Smidt Nielsen, Annette Mogensen
46	1984–04–08	Gresty Road Stadium, England	England	1–2	EC	Inge Hindkjær (pen.)
47	1984–04–28	Hjørring Stadium, Denmark	England	0–1	EC	
48	1984–10–24	Odense Stadium, Denmark	Finland	1–1	EQ	Helle Pedersen

== Sources ==
- (in Danish) Landsholdsdatabasen at DBU.dk
