= England women's national football team results (1980–1989) =

- Win Draw Loss

This is a list of the England women's national football team results from 1980 to 1989.

== Results ==
=== 1980 ===
1 May 1980 Friendly	Belgium	2–1	England	Ostend, Belgium
	Goal		Goal	Stadium: Albertpark

1 June 1980 Friendly	England	6–1	Wales	Warminster, England
	Stirling; Bampton; Foreman; Chapman; Curl; Doe		Goal	Stadium: Weymouth Street

17 September 1980 Friendly	England	1–1	Sweden	Leicester, England
	Foreman		Söderström	Stadium: Filbert Street; Referee: John Hunting (England)

=== 1981 ===
3 May 1981 Friendly	Republic of Ireland	0–5	England	Dublin, Republic of Ireland
			Byrne (o.g.); Foreman; Reynolds; Hutchinson	Stadium: Dalymount Park; Referee: Eamon Farrell (Ireland)

6 September 1981 1981 Mundialito	Japan	0–4	England	Kobe, Japan
		Report	Gallimore 45', 48'; Johnson 71'; Bampton 75'	Stadium: Kobe Central Stadium

9 September 1981 1981 Mundialito	England	0–1	Denmark	Tokyo, Japan
		Report	Pedersen 49'	Stadium: Nishigaoka Stadium

25 October 1981 Friendly	England	0–3	Norway	Cambridge, England
			Nyborg; Pedersen; Nielsen	Stadium: Abbey Stadium; Attendance: 1,300; Referee: C.A.Maskell (England)

=== 1982 ===
26 May 1982 Friendly	Sweden	1–1	England	Kinna, Sweden
	Sundhage		Dobb	Stadium: Viskavallen; Attendance: 777

11 June 1982 Friendly	Italy	2–0	England	Castiglione, Italy
	Morace; Vignotto

19 September 1982 1984 European Competition qualifying	England	7–1	Northern Ireland	Crewe, England
	Davis; Doe; Curl (pen.); Turner; Coultard		Goal	Stadium: Gresty Road; Referee: Neil Midgley (England)

3 October 1982 1984 European Competition qualifying	Scotland	0–4	England	Dumbarton, Scotland
			Davis	Stadium: Boghead Park

7 November 1982 1984 European Competition qualifying	Republic of Ireland	0–1	England	Dublin, Republic of Ireland
		Report	Davis	Stadium: Dalymount Park; Referee: Patrick Daly (Ireland)

=== 1983 ===
14 May 1983 1984 European Competition qualifying	Northern Ireland	0–4	England	Belfast, Northern Ireland
			Davis; Curl; Chapman	Stadium: Seaview; Referee: Hugh Wilson (Northern Ireland)

22 May 1983 1984 European Competition qualifying	England	2–0	Scotland	Leeds, England
	Chapman			Stadium: Elland Road; Referee: David Richardson (England)

11 September 1983 1984 European Competition qualifying	England	6–0	Republic of Ireland	Reading, England
	Davis; Gallimore; Deighan; Curl; Fitzpatrick (o.g.)	Report		Stadium: Elm Park; Referee: Alan Robinson (England)

30 October 1983 Friendly	England	2–2	Sweden	Charlton, England
	Davis; Curl		Björk; Svenjeby	Stadium: The Valley; Attendance: 991

=== 1984 ===
8 April 1984 1984 European Competition semi-final first leg	England	2–1	Denmark	Crewe, England
	Curl 31'; Deighan 51'	Report	Hindkjær 49' (pen.)	Stadium: Gresty Road; Attendance: 1,000; Referee: Kevin O'Sullivan (Ireland)

28 April 1984 1984 European Competition semi-final second leg	Denmark	0–1 (1–3 agg.)	England	Hjørring, Denmark
		Report	Bampton 44'	Stadium: Hjørring Stadium; Attendance: 1,439; Referee: Kaj Natri (Finland)

12 May 1984 1984 European Competition Final first leg	Sweden	1–0	England	Gothenburg, Sweden
	Sundhage 57'	Report		Stadium: Ullevi; Attendance: 5,662; Referee: Cees Bakker (Netherlands)

27 May 1984 1984 European Competition Final second leg	England	1–0 (1–1 agg.) (3–4 p)	Sweden	Luton, England
	Curl 31'	Report		Stadium: Kenilworth Road; Attendance: 2,567; Referee: Ignace Goris (Belgium)
	Penalties
	Curl (penalty missed); Gallimore (penalty scored); Bampton (penalty scored); Dobb (penalty missed); Davis (penalty scored)		(penalty scored) Börjesson; (penalty scored) Andersson; (penalty missed) Björk; (penalty scored) Jansson; (penalty scored) Sundhage
Note: 1–1 on aggregate. No extra time played. Sweden won 4–3 on penalties.

20 August 1984 1984 Mundialito group stage	England	1–1	Belgium	Jesolo, Italy
	Curl		Martens	Stadium: Stadio Armando Picchi

22 August 1984 1984 Mundialito group stage	England	0–2	West Germany	Jesolo, Italy
			Neid	Stadium: Stadio Armando Picchi

24 August 1984 1984 Mundialito group stage	Italy	1–1	England	Jesolo, Italy
	Morace		Curl	Stadium: Stadio Armando Picchi

25 August 1984 1984 Mundialito 3rd place	England	2–1	Belgium	Caorle, Italy
	Spacey; Curl		Goal	Stadium: Stadio Giovanni Chiggiato

27 August 1984 Friendly	Italy	1–3	England	Monfalcone, Italy
	Goal		Gallimore; Powell; Chapman	Stadium: Stadio Comunale Monfalcone

=== 1985 ===
17 March 1985 1987 European Competition qualifying	England	4–0	Scotland	Preston, England
	Coultard; Powell; Davis; Turner			Stadium: Deepdale; Referee: Neil Midgeley (England)

25 May 1985 1987 European Competition qualifying	Northern Ireland	1–8	England	Antrim, Northern Ireland
	Goal		Davis; Curl; Powell	Stadium: Allen Park

17 August 1985 Friendly	England	6–0	Wales	Ramsey, Isle of Man
	Sherrard; Turner; Powell; Davis; Spacey			Stadium: Ballacloan Stadium

19 August 1985 1985 Mundialito group stage	England	0–1	Denmark	Caorle, Italy
			Pedersen	Stadium: Stadio Giovanni Chiggiato

20 August 1985 1985 Mundialito group stage	England	1–1	Italy	Caorle, Italy
	Davis		Golin	Stadium: Stadio Giovanni Chiggiato

23 August 1985 1985 Mundialito group stage	England	3–1	United States	Caorle, Italy
	Spacey; Curl; Gallimore		Akers	Stadium: Stadio Giovanni Chiggiato

25 August 1985 1985 Mundialito Final	Italy	2–3	England	Caorle, Italy
	Golin		Spacey; Sempare	Stadium: Stadio Giovanni Chiggiato

22 September 1985 1987 European Competition qualifying	Republic of Ireland	0–6	England	Cork, Ireland
			Linda Curl; Hope Powell; Gillian Coultard; Brenda Sempare	Stadium: Flower Lodge; Referee: Neil Midgley (England)

=== 1986 ===
16 March 1986 1987 European Competition qualifying	England	10–0	Northern Ireland	Blackburn, England
	Goal			Stadium: Ewood Park

27 April 1986 1987 European Competition qualifying	England	4–0	Republic of Ireland	Reading, England
	Davis 42', 77'; Curl 47'; Law 50'	Report		Stadium: Elm Park

12 October 1986 1987 European Competition qualifying	Scotland	1–3	England	Kirkcaldy, Scotland
	Goal		Davis; Powell; Spacey	Stadium: Stark's Park

=== 1987 ===
29 March 1987 Friendly	Republic of Ireland	0–1	England	Dublin, Republic of Ireland
			Davis	Stadium: Dalymount Park

11 April 1987 Friendly	England	6–0	Northern Ireland	Leeds, England
	Spacey; Powell; Sempare; Curl			Stadium: Elland Road

11 June 1987 1987 European Competition semi-final	Sweden	3–2 (a.e.t.)	England	Moss, Norway
	Börjesson 32'; Axén 50', 100'	Report	Sherrard 35'; Davis 43'	Stadium: Melløs Stadion; Attendance: 300; Referee: Michał Listkiewicz (Poland)

13 June 1987 1987 European Competition 3rd place	Italy	2–1	England	Drammen, Norway
	Morace 36'; Vignotto 50'	Report	Davis 4' (pen.)	Stadium: Marienlyst Stadion; Attendance: 504; Referee: Peter Mikkelsen (Denmark)

25 October 1987 1989 European Competition qualifying	Finland	1–2	England	Kirkkonummi, Finland
	Sarlin 79'		Curl 55'; Stanley 66'	Stadium: Urheilukenttä; Referee: Wieland Ziller (West Germany

8 November 1987 1989 European Competition qualifying	England	2–1	Denmark	Blackburn, England
	Spacey 34'; Davis 40' (pen.)	Report	J. Hansen 44'	Stadium: Ewood Park; Attendance: 700; Referee: John Lloyd (Wales)

=== 1988 ===
8 May 1988 1989 European Competition qualifying	Denmark	2–0	England	Herning, Denmark
	Jacobsen 5'; Obel 58'	Report		Stadium: Herning Stadion; Attendance: 1,200; Referee: Rune Larsson (Sweden)

22 July 1988 1988 Mundialito group stage	England	1–1	France	Riva del Garda, Italy
	Goal		Musset	Stadium: Campo Sportivo Benecense

27 July 1988 1988 Mundialito semi-final	England	2–0	United States	Riva del Garda, Italy
	Goal			Stadium: Campo Sportivo Benecense

30 July 1988 1988 Mundialito Final	England	2–1 (a.e.t.)	Italy	Arco, Italy
	Curl		Morace	Stadium: Stadio Comunal di Arco

21 August 1988 1989 European Competition qualifying	Norway	2–0	England	Kleppe, Norway
	Medalen; Scheel Aalbu	Report		Stadium: Klepp Stadion; Attendance: 1,517; Referee: Bo Helén (Sweden)

4 September 1988 1989 European Competition qualifying	England	1–1	Finland	London, England
	Spacey		Kaasinen	Stadium: The Den; Referee: Keith Burge (England)

18 September 1988 1989 European Competition qualifying	England	1–3	Norway	Blackburn, England
	Walker 13'	Report	Zaborowski 43'; Haugen 51' (pen.); Hegstad 62'	Stadium: Ewood Park; Attendance: 300; Referee: Frederick McKnight (Northern Ireland)

=== 1989 ===
30 April 1989 Friendly	Scotland	0–3	England	Kirkcaldy, Scotland
			Goal	Stadium: Stark's Park

13 May 1989 1989 Four Nations Tournament	England	0–0	Netherlands	Épinal, France
				Stadium: Stade de la Colombière

14 May 1989 1989 Four Nations Tournament	England	2–0	Belgium	Épinal, France
	Goal			Stadium: Stade de la Colombière

23 May 1989 Friendly	England	0–2	Sweden	London, England
			Sundhage; Videkull	Stadium: Wembley Stadium; Attendance: 3,150; Referee: Brian Hill (England)

1 October 1989 Euro 1991 qualifying group stage	England	0–0	Finland	Brentford, England
				Stadium: Griffin Park; Attendance: 2,083; Referee: Leslie Irvine (Ireland)

1 November 1989 Friendly	England	1–1	Italy	High Wycombe, England
	Davis (pen.)		D'Astolfo	Stadium: Loakes Park; Attendance: 1013
