= 1978 Women's Nordic Football Championship =

Tournament details
- Host country: Denmark
- Dates: 7 July – 9 July 1978
- Teams: 4
- Venue: 4 (in 4 host cities)

Final positions
- Champions: Sweden (2nd title)

Tournament statistics
- Matches played: 6
- Goals scored: 11 (1.83 per match)
- Attendance: 1,900 (317 per match)
- Top scorer: 11 players (1 goal)

1978 Women's Nordic Football Championship was the fifth edition of the Women's Nordic Football Championship tournament. It was held from 7 July to 9 July in Denmark. This was the first time as Norway joined the tournament.

The match between Norway and Sweden on 7 July was the first ever international for Norway women's national football team.

== Standings ==
Team	Pld	W	D	L	GF	GA	GD	Pts
Sweden	3	2	1	0	3	1	+2	5
Denmark	3	2	0	1	6	1	+5	4
Finland	3	1	1	1	1	4	−3	3
Norway	3	0	0	3	1	5	−4	0

== Results ==
7 July 1978
12:00

Norway	1–2	Sweden
Nielsen ?'	Report	Börjesson ?'; Ödlund ?'

Kolding Stadion, Kolding
Attendance: 100
Referee: Kurt Sørensen, Denmark

7 July 1978
20:00

Denmark	4–0	Finland
Smidt Nielsen 8'; Fabrin 11'; Riggelsen 20'; Holst 70'	Report

Kolding Stadion, Kolding
Attendance: 300
Referee: Ejner Jensen, Denmark

8 July 1978
12:00

Finland	0–0	Sweden
	Report

Horsens Idraetspark, Horsens
Attendance: 100
Referee: Peer Frickmann, Denmark

8 July 1978
16:00

Denmark	2–0	Norway
Ehmsen 38'; Pedersen 55'	Report

Brande Stadion, Brande
Attendance: 200
Referee: Knud Garde, Denmark

9 July 1978

Finland	1–0	Norway
Sundman 48'	Report

Vejle Stadion, Vejle
Attendance: 500
Referee: Poul J. Jensen, Denmark

9 July 1978
15:00

Denmark	0–1	Sweden
	Report	Erlandsson 5'

Vejle Stadion, Vejle
Attendance: 700
Referee: Henning Lund Sørensen, Denmark

== Goalscorers ==
1 goal

- (Sweden) Anette Börjesson
- (Denmark) Britta Ehmsen
- (Sweden) Susanne Erlandsson
- (Denmark) Kirsten Fabrin
- (Denmark) Anne Grete Holst
- (Norway) Kari Nielsen
- (Denmark) Inger Pedersen
- (Denmark) Fridel Riggelsen
- (Denmark) Lone Smidt Nielsen
- (Finland) Tuula Sundman
- (Sweden) Karin Ödlund

== Sources ==
- Nordic Championships (Women) 1978 Rec.Sport.Soccer Statistics Foundation
- Landsholdsdatabasen Danish Football Association
- Lautela, Yrjö & Wallén, Göran: Rakas jalkapallo — Sata vuotta suomalaista jalkapalloa, p. 418. Football Association of Finland / Teos Publishing 2007. ISBN 978-951-851-068-3.
