= 1982 Women's Nordic Football Championship =

Tournament details
- Host country: Denmark
- Dates: 14 July – 18 July 1982
- Teams: 4
- Venue: 3 (in 3 host cities)

Final positions
- Champions: Denmark (4th title)

Tournament statistics
- Matches played: 6
- Goals scored: 14 (2.33 per match)
- Attendance: 3,000 (500 per match)
- Top scorer: (Denmark) Lone Smidt Nielsen (3 goals)

1982 Women's Nordic Football Championship was the ninth and last edition of the Women's Nordic Football Championship tournament. It was held from 14 July to 18 July in Herning, Kolding and Vejle in Denmark.

== Standings ==
Team	Pld	W	D	L	GF	GA	GD	Pts
Denmark	3	2	1	0	4	2	+2	5
Sweden	3	1	1	1	6	3	+3	3
Norway	3	0	3	0	3	3	±0	3
Finland	3	0	1	2	1	6	−5	1

== Results ==
14 July 1982
17:30

Denmark	1–1	Norway
Smidt Nielsen 47'	Report	Støre 18'

Kolding Stadion, Kolding
Attendance: 550
Referee: Henning Bertelsen, Denmark

14 July 1982

Finland	0–4	Sweden
	Report	Johansson 11'; Andersson 15' 22'; Söderström 53'

Kolding Stadion, Kolding
Attendance: 550
Referee: H. G. Petersen, Denmark

16 July 1982
17:30

Denmark	1–0	Finland
Smidt Nielsen 4'	Report

Herning Stadion, Herning
Attendance: 400
Referee: Carl Aage Thybo, Denmark

16 July 1982

Norway	1–1	Sweden
Stendal ?'	Report	Söderström ?'

Herning Stadion, Herning
Attendance: 300

18 July 1982
18:00

Denmark	2–1	Sweden
Gam-Pedersen 7'; Smidt Nielsen 80'	Report	Ödlund 38'

Vejle Stadion, Vejle
Attendance: 900
Referee: Erik Steen Jensen, Denmark

18 July 1982

Finland	1–1	Norway
Kaasinen 53'	Report	Nyborg ?'

Vejle Stadion, Vejle
Attendance: 300
Referee: K. E. Gaarde, Denmark

== Goalscorers ==
3 goals

- (Denmark) Lone Smidt Nielsen

2 goals

- (Sweden) Eva Andersson
- (Sweden) Birgitta Söderström

1 goal

- (Denmark) Annie Gam-Pedersen
- (Sweden) Helene Johansson
- (Finland) Ulla Kaasinen
- (Norway) Gunn Lisbeth Nyborg
- (Norway) Trude Margaret Stendal
- (Norway) Heidi Støre
- (Sweden) Karin Ödlund

== Sources ==
- Nordic Championships (Women) 1982 Rec.Sport.Soccer Statistics Foundation
- Lautela, Yrjö & Wallén, Göran: Rakas jalkapallo — Sata vuotta suomalaista jalkapalloa, p. 419. Football Association of Finland / Teos Publishing 2007. ISBN 978-951-851-068-3.
