= 1984 European Competition for Women's Football qualifying =

Football tournament qualification stage

The qualification for the 1984 European Competition for Women's Football was held between 18 August 1982 and 28 October 1983.

Teams were placed into four groups of four teams each according to geographical location — Group 1 was Northern Europe, Group 2 was Great Britain and Ireland, Group 3 was Southern Europe, Group 4 was Central Europe.

Each team played each other team in its group twice, home and away, earning two points for a win and one for a draw. The first-placed teams qualified.

== Results ==
=== Group 1 (North) ===
Team	Pts	Pld	W	D	L	GF	GA
Sweden	12	6	6	0	0	26	1
Norway	7	6	3	1	2	10	6
Finland	4	6	2	0	4	5	17
Iceland	1	6	0	1	5	2	19

18 August 1982

Finland	0–6	Sweden
	SvFF Report (in Swedish)	Björk 5' 42'; A. Jansson 25'; Söderström 37'; Ödlund 48' 65'

Vammala IP, Vammala
Referee: Reidar Bjørnestad (Norway)

28 August 1982

Norway	2–2	Iceland
Kneppen; Landsem	NFF Report (in Norwegian); KSÍ Report (in Icelandic)	Gunnlaugsdóttir 12'; Valdimarsdóttir 27'

Tønsberg Gressbane, Tønsberg
Attendance: 1,000
Referee: Svein-Inge Thime (Norway)

9 September 1982

Iceland	0–6	Sweden
	KSÍ Report (in Icelandic); SvFF Report (in Swedish)	Ödlund 6'; Hållstrand 24'; Björk 29'; Sundhage 42'; Börjesson 44'; A. Jansson 60'

Kópavogsvöllur, Kópavogur
Attendance: 352
Referee: Peer Frickmann (Denmark)

15 September 1982

Finland	0–3	Norway
	NFF Report (in Norwegian)	Nielsen; Frøiland; Nyborg

Arto Tolsa Areena, Kotka
Attendance: 1,500
Referee: Kai Natri (Finland)

29 September 1982

Sweden	2–0	Norway
Björk 33'; Börjesson 62' (pen.)	NFF Report (in Norwegian); SvFF Report (in Swedish)

Tyresövallen, Tyresö
Attendance: 3,336
Referee: Alex Jacobsen (Denmark)

8 June 1983

Sweden	5–0	Finland
Eva Andersson 10'; Svenjeby 14'; Björk 36'; Söderström 60'; Börjesson 69' (pen.)	SvFF Report (in Swedish)

Nipvallen, Sollefteå
Attendance: 2,800
Referee: Torben Månsson (Denmark)

30 July 1983

Iceland	0–1	Norway
	NFF Report (in Norwegian); KSÍ Report (in Icelandic)	Nielsen

Kópavogsvöllur, Kópavogur
Attendance: 300
Referee: Eysteinn Guðmundsson (Iceland)

18 August 1983

Norway	3–0	Finland
Støre; Stendal	NFF Report (in Norwegian)

Åråsen Stadion, Lillestrøm
Attendance: 1,000
Referee: Thorodd Presberg (Norway)

21 August 1983

Iceland	0–2	Finland
	KSÍ Report (in Icelandic)

Kópavogsvöllur, Kópavogur
Referee: Óli Olsen (Iceland)

24 August 1983

Sweden	5–0	Iceland
Sundhage 9' 15'; Svenjeby 17'; Björk 18'; Söderström 25'	KSÍ Report (in Icelandic); SvFF Report (in Swedish)

Brunnsvallen, Ronneby
Referee: Nielsen (Denmark)

27 August 1983

Finland	3–0	Iceland
	KSÍ Report (in Icelandic)

Porvoo
Referee: Heikki Tuominen (Finland)

24 September 1983

Norway	1–2	Sweden
Nyborg 38'	NFF Report (in Norwegian); SvFF Report (in Swedish)	Hultin 42'; Åhman 65'

Sentralidrettsplassen, Elverum
Attendance: 400
Referee: Jan Hora (Czechoslovakia)

Sweden qualified for the final tournament.

=== Group 2 (Great Britain and Ireland) ===
Team	Pts	Pld	W	D	L	GF	GA
England	12	6	6	0	0	24	1
Scotland	7	6	3	1	2	9	8
Republic of Ireland	5	6	2	1	3	6	14
Northern Ireland	0	6	0	0	6	5	21

4 September 1982

Northern Ireland	1–2	Scotland

Belfast
Referee: Alan Snoddy (Northern Ireland)

19 September 1982

England	7–1	Northern Ireland

Crewe
Referee: Neil Midgley (England)

19 September 1982

Scotland	3–0	Republic of Ireland
	FAI Report

East End Park, Dunfermline
Referee: Alan Ferguson (Scotland)

2 October 1982

Northern Ireland	1–2	Republic of Ireland
	FAI Report

Clandeboye Park, Bangor
Referee: Frederick McKnight (Northern Ireland)

October 3, 1982

Scotland	0–4	England

Dumbarton
Referee: Hugh Alexander (Scotland)

7 November 1982

Republic of Ireland	0–1	England
	FAI Report

Dublin
Referee: Patrick Daly (Ireland)

18 March 1983

Republic of Ireland	1–1	Scotland
	FAI Report

Dublin
Referee: John Kinsella (Ireland)

17 April 1983

Scotland	3–0	Northern Ireland

Glasgow
Referee: Brian McGinlay (Scotland)

14 May 1983

Northern Ireland	0–4	England

Belfast
Referee: Hugh Wilson (Northern Ireland)

22 May 1983

England	2–0	Scotland

Leeds
Referee: David Richardson (England)

11 September 1983

England	6–0	Republic of Ireland
	FAI Report

Elm Park, Reading
Referee: Alan Robinson (England)

23 October 1983

Republic of Ireland	3–2	Northern Ireland
	FAI Report

Dublin
Referee: ? Gallagher (Ireland)

England qualified for the final tournament.

=== Group 3 (South) ===
Team	Pts	Pld	W	D	L	GF	GA
Italy	10	6	5	0	1	12	1
France	7	6	2	3	1	4	4
Switzerland	5	6	1	3	2	4	6
Portugal	2	6	0	2	4	1	10

10 October 1982
15:00

Switzerland	2–0	Portugal
Hüsler 23'; Odermatt 33'	FPF Report (in Portuguese); ASF-SFV Report (in German)

Stadion FC Solothurn, Solothurn
Attendance: 900
Referee: Arthur Pernkopf (Austria)
Match info

30 October 1982
15:00

France	1–0	Italy
Musset 28'	Report (in French)

Stade Georges Pompidou, Valence
Attendance: 1,343
Referee: Ulrich Nyffenegger (Switzerland)

14 November 1982

Italy	3–0	Portugal
Vignotto 4', 26', 32'	FPF Report (in Portuguese); FIGC Report (in Italian)

Stadio Luigi Ferraris, Genoa
Referee: Glamar (Yugoslavia)

4 December 1982

Portugal	0–0	France
	Report (in French); FPF Report (in Portuguese)

Estádio da Tapadinha, Lisbon
Attendance: 3,000
Referee: Victoriano Sánchez Arminio (Spain)

12 February 1983
15:00

France	2–0	Portugal
Wolf 14'; Musset 32'	Report (in French); FPF Report (in Portuguese)

Stade Municipal, Pauillac
Attendance: 3,251
Referee: Norbert Risch (Luxembourg)

3 April 1983

Portugal	1–1	Switzerland
Alfredina 60'	FPF Report (in Portuguese); ASF-SFV Report (in German)	Willi 40'

Estádio Municipal de Coimbra, Coimbra
Attendance: 6,300
Referee: José Maria Miguel Pérez (Spain)
Match info

24 April 1983
16:30

Italy	3–0	France
Vignotto 8', 59' (pen.); Ferraguzzi 24'	Report (in French); FIGC Report (in Italian)

Stadio Romeo Menti, Vicenza
Attendance: 8,487
Referee: Damir Matovinović (Yugoslavia)

7 May 1983
16:00

France	1–1	Switzerland
Musset 27'	Report (in French); ASF-SFV Report (in German)	Moser 50' (pen.)

Stade Alberto Corazza, Meaux
Attendance: 2,500
Referee: Louis Delsemme (Belgium)
Match info

23 May 1983
17:30

Switzerland	0–2	Italy
	FIGC Report (in Italian); ASF-SFV Report (in German)	Morace 8'; Vignotto 73' (pen.)

Cornaredo Stadium, Lugano
Attendance: 1,000
Referee: Aron Schmidhuber (West Germany)
Match info

24 June 1983

Portugal	0–2	Italy
	FPF Report (in Portuguese); FIGC Report (in Italian)	Vignotto 24', 27'

Estádio do Bessa, Porto
Referee: Albert Thomas (Netherlands)

17 September 1983

Italy	2–0	Switzerland
Vignotto 8', 23'	FIGC Report (in Italian); ASF-SFV Report (in German)

Stadio Flaminio, Rome
Attendance: 3,400
Referee: Georgios Koukoulakis (Greece)
Match info

29 October 1983
15:00

Switzerland	0–0	France
	Report (in French); ASF-SFV Report (in German)

Stadion Neumatt, Burgdorf
Attendance: 500
Referee: Karl-Heinz Tritschler (West Germany)
Match info

Italy qualified for the final tournament.

=== Group 4 (Central) ===
Team	Pts	Pld	W	D	L	GF	GA
Denmark	8	6	3	2	1	8	5
Netherlands	6	6	2	2	2	12	9
West Germany	5	6	0	5	1	6	7
Belgium	5	6	1	3	2	7	12

25 September 1982

Belgium	3–2	Netherlands
Martens 50'; Poesen 59'; Martens 65'	KNVB Report (in Dutch); KBVB Report (in Dutch)	Fortuin 30' de Jong-Desaunois 56'

Heysel Stadium, Brussels
Referee: Louis Delsemme (Belgium)

13 October 1982
20:00

Netherlands	2–1	Denmark
Camper 34' de Bakker 38'	KNVB Report (in Dutch); DBU Report (in Danish)	Mogensen 24'

Oosterpark Stadion, Groningen
Attendance: 2,000
Referee: Egbert Mulder (Netherlands)

6 November 1982
16:00

Denmark	1–0	Belgium
Nielsen-Mann 11'	DBU Report (in Danish); KBVB Report (in Dutch)

Tårnby Stadion, Tårnby
Attendance: 300
Referee: Ole Amundsen (Denmark)

5 March 1983

West Germany	1–1	Belgium
Gebauer 61'	KBVB Report (in Dutch); DFB Report (in German)	A. Martens 6'

Belkaw-Arena, Bergisch Gladbach
Referee: Dieter Pauly (West Germany)

19 March 1983

Netherlands	2–2	West Germany
Camper 42' de Visser 57' (pen.)	KNVB Report (in Dutch); DFB Report (in German)	Camper 7' (o.g.); Bormann 68'

De Wieën, Venray
Attendance: 3,500
Referee: Henk van Ettekoven (Netherlands)

23 April 1983

Netherlands	5–0	Belgium
de Visser 15'; Timisela 41'; Camper 43'; Timmer 53' de Haan 61'	KNVB Report (in Dutch); KBVB Report (in Dutch)

Sportpark De Warande, Oosterhout
Referee: Gerard Geurds (Netherlands)

30 April 1983
16:00

West Germany	1–1	Denmark
Koekkoek 29'	DBU Report (in Danish); DFB Report (in German)	J. Andersen 51'

Stadion an der Düsternortstraße, Delmenhorst
Attendance: 5,300
Referee: Jan Redelfs (West Germany)

24 September 1983

Denmark	1–0	West Germany
L. S. Nielsen 17'	DBU Report (in Danish); DFB Report (in German)

Sønderborg Stadion, Sønderborg
Attendance: 1,000
Referee: Henning Lund-Sørensen (Denmark)

8 October 1983
15:00

Belgium	2–2	Denmark
Verdonck 55'; Poesen 74'	DBU Report (in Danish); KBVB Report (in Dutch)	Frederiksen 17', 43'

Heysel Stadium, Brussels
Attendance: 700

8 October 1983

West Germany	1–1	Netherlands
Eichenlaub 30'	KNVB Report (in Dutch); DFB Report (in German)	de Visser 46'

Leimbachstadion, Siegen
Attendance: 1,800
Referee: Karl-Josef Assenmacher (West Germany)

22 October 1983

Belgium	1–1	West Germany
C. Martens 55'	KBVB Report (in Dutch); DFB Report (in German)	Neid 46'

Heysel Stadium, Brussels
Referee: Jean-François Crucke (Belgium)

29 October 1983
15:00

Denmark	2–0	Netherlands
L. S. Nielsen 20'; Mogensen 27'	KNVB Report (in Dutch); DBU Report (in Danish)

Sønderborg Stadion, Sønderborg
Attendance: 1,800
Referee: Walter Eschweiler (West Germany)

Denmark qualified for the final tournament.
