= Women's Nordic Football Championship =

- Founded: 1974
- Abolished: 1982
- Region: Nordic countries
- Teams: 3–4
- Most championships: Sweden (5); Denmark (4)

Women's Nordic Football Championship was an international football competition contested by the women's national football teams of the Nordic countries. The tournament was held annually between 1974 and 1982. Finland, Denmark and Sweden competed from the start, Norway joined the tournament in 1978. Iceland and Faroe Islands did not take part at the competition.

== Results ==
Year	Host	Winner	Runner-up	3rd Place	4th Place
1974; Details	Finland	Denmark	Sweden	Finland	Only three participants
1975; Details	Denmark	Denmark	Sweden	Finland	Only three participants
1976; Details	Sweden	Denmark	Sweden	Finland	Only three participants
1977; Details	Finland	Sweden	Denmark	Finland	Only three participants
1978; Details	Denmark	Sweden	Denmark	Finland	Norway
1979; Details	Norway	Sweden	Denmark	Finland	Norway
1980; Details	Sweden	Sweden	Denmark	Norway	Finland
1981; Details	Finland	Sweden	Finland	Denmark	Norway
1982; Details	Denmark	Denmark	Sweden	Norway	Finland

== Medal summary ==
Rank	Nation	Gold	Silver	Bronze	Total
1	Sweden	5	4	0	9
2	Denmark	4	4	1	9
3	Finland	0	1	6	7
4	Norway	0	0	2	2
Totals (4 entries)		9	9	9	27

== General statistics ==
Pos	Team	Part	Pld	W	D	L	GF	GA	Dif	Pts
1	Denmark	9	23	14	5	4	48	15	+33	47
2	Sweden	9	23	14	5	4	46	17	+29	47
3	Finland	9	23	3	6	14	9	56	-47	15
4	Norway	5	15	0	6	9	10	25	-15	6

== Top goalscorers ==
10 goals

- (Sweden) Pia Sundhage

8 goals

- (Denmark) Lone Smidt Nielsen

7 goals

- (Denmark) Annette Frederiksen
- (Denmark) Susanne Niemann
- (Sweden) Birgitta Söderström

6 goals

- (Sweden) Ann Jansson

5 goals

- (Sweden) Görel Sintorn
- (Sweden) Karin Ödlund

4 goals

- (Denmark) Anne Grete Holst

3 goals

- (Sweden) Eva Andersson
- (Denmark) Britta Ehmsen
- (Denmark) Inge Hindkjær

== See also ==
- Nordic Football Championship (Men's)
- FIFA Women's World Cup
- Football at the Summer Olympics
- Algarve Cup
