= 1980 Women's Nordic Football Championship =

Tournament details
- Host country: Sweden
- Dates: 10 July – 13 July 1980
- Teams: 4
- Venue: 5 (in 3 host cities)

Final positions
- Champions: Sweden (4th title)

Tournament statistics
- Matches played: 6
- Goals scored: 21 (3.5 per match)
- Attendance: 10,388 (1,731 per match)
- Top scorer: (Sweden) Pia Sundhage (4 goals)

1980 Women's Nordic Football Championship was the seventh edition of the Women's Nordic Football Championship tournament. It was held from 10 July to 13 July in Gothenburg, Mölndal, and Öckerö in Sweden.

== Standings ==
Team	Pld	W	D	L	GF	GA	GD	Pts
Sweden	3	1	2	0	11	4	+7	4
Denmark	3	1	2	0	7	3	+4	4
Norway	3	0	2	1	2	6	−4	2
Finland	3	0	2	1	1	8	−7	2

== Results ==
10 July 1980
16:00

Denmark	4–0	Norway
Stengård ?'; Ehmsen ?'; Hansen ?'; Hindkjær ?'	Report

Hovåsvallen, Gothenburg
Attendance: 150
Referee: L-O. Eliasson, Sweden

10 July 1980

Finland	0–7	Sweden
	Report	Sintorn 3' 24'; Sundhage 6' 68' 70'; Lundstedt 13'; Ödlund 65'

Kvarnbyvallen, Mölndal
Attendance: 1,030
Referee: Christer Drottz, Sweden

11 July 1980
17:00

Denmark	1–1	Finland
Niemann ?'	Report	Leskinen ?'

Prästängen, Öckerö
Attendance: 1,538
Referee: Lars-Göran Andersson, Sweden

11 July 1980

Norway	2–2	Sweden
Pedersen ?'; Nielsen ?'	Report	Sundhage ?'; Ödlund ?'

Prästängen, Öckerö
Attendance: 1,585
Referee: Roland Henkelman, Sweden

13 July 1980

Finland	0–0	Norway
	Report

Gamla Ullevi, Gothenburg
Attendance: 285
Referee: Kjell Lind, Sweden

13 July 1980
19:00

Denmark	2–2	Sweden
Hindkjær 20'; Holst 39'	Report	Lundmark 25'; Sintorn 63'

Nya Ullevi, Gothenburg
Attendance: 5,800
Referee: J. Almqvist, Sweden

== Goalscorers ==
4 goals

- (Sweden) Pia Sundhage

3 goals

- (Sweden) Görel Sintorn

2 goals

- (Denmark) Inge Hindkjær
- (Sweden) Karin Ödlund

1 goal

- (Denmark) Britta Ehmsen
- (Denmark) Jette Hansen
- (Denmark) Anne Grete Holst
- (Finland) Irmeli Leskinen
- (Sweden) Susanne Lundmark
- (Sweden) Ingegerd Lundstedt
- (Norway) Kari Nielsen
- (Denmark) Susanne Niemann
- (Norway) Grete Pedersen
- (Denmark) Ann Stengård

== Sources ==
- Nordic Championships (Women) 1980 Rec.Sport.Soccer Statistics Foundation
- Lautela, Yrjö & Wallén, Göran: Rakas jalkapallo — Sata vuotta suomalaista jalkapalloa, p. 418–419. Football Association of Finland / Teos Publishing 2007. ISBN 978-951-851-068-3.
