= 1981 Women's Nordic Football Championship =

Tournament details
- Host country: Finland
- Dates: 15 July – 19 July 1981
- Teams: 4
- Venue: 4 (in 4 host cities)

Final positions
- Champions: Sweden (5th title)

Tournament statistics
- Matches played: 6
- Goals scored: 12 (2 per match)
- Attendance: 2,970 (495 per match)
- Top scorer(s): (Sweden) Pia Sundhage (Sweden) Birgitta Söderström (2 goals each)

1981 Women's Nordic Football Championship was the eighth edition of the Women's Nordic Football Championship tournament. It was held from 15 July to 19 July in Finland.

== Standings ==
Team	Pld	W	D	L	GF	GA	GD	Pts
Sweden	3	3	0	0	6	1	+5	6
Finland	3	1	1	1	3	4	−1	4
Denmark	3	0	2	1	1	2	−1	2
Norway	3	0	1	2	2	5	−3	1

== Results ==
15 July 1981

Norway	0–2	Sweden
	Report	Andersson ?'; Ödlund ?'

Centralplan, Karis
Attendance: 285

16 July 1981
18:00

Denmark	0–0	Finland
	Report

Töölön Pallokenttä, Helsinki
Attendance: 550
Referee: Ari Petäjä, Finland

17 July 1981
19:00

Denmark	0–0	Norway
	Report

Keskuskenttä, Porvoo
Attendance: 300
Referee: Taisto Mäkelä, Finland

17 July 1981

Finland	0–2	Sweden
	Report	Sundhage 30'; Söderström 52'

Urheilupuisto, Hyvinkää
Attendance: 300
Referee: Erkki Multanen, Finland

19 July 1981
14:00

Denmark	1–2	Sweden
Own goal ?'	Report	Söderström 7'; Sundhage 20'

Töölön Pallokenttä, Helsinki
Attendance: 750
Referee: Heikki L. Tuominen, Finland

19 July 1981

Finland	3–2	Norway
Rautiainen 8'; Mortensen Kvistnes 18' (o.g.); Jääskeläinen 23'	Report	Støre 39'; Bjørkli 76'

Töölön Pallokenttä, Helsinki
Attendance: 785
Referee: Gunnar Hellgren, Finland

== Goalscorers ==
2 goals

- (Sweden) Pia Sundhage
- (Sweden) Birgitta Söderström

1 goal

- (Sweden) Eva Andersson
- (Norway) Marit Bjørkli
- (Finland) Eeva Jääskeläinen
- (Finland) Jutta Rautiainen
- (Norway) Heidi Støre
- (Sweden) Karin Ödlund

Own goal

- (Norway) Mariann Mortensen Kvistnes (against Finland)
- (Sweden) Unknown player (against Denmark)

== Sources ==
- Nordic Championships (Women) 1981 Rec.Sport.Soccer Statistics Foundation
- Lautela, Yrjö & Wallén, Göran: Rakas jalkapallo — Sata vuotta suomalaista jalkapalloa, p. 419. Football Association of Finland / Teos Publishing 2007. ISBN 978-951-851-068-3.
