= 1979 Women's Nordic Football Championship =

Tournament details
- Host country: Norway
- Dates: 5 July – 8 July 1979
- Teams: 4
- Venue: 3 (in 3 host cities)

Final positions
- Champions: Sweden (3rd title)

Tournament statistics
- Matches played: 6
- Goals scored: 19 (3.17 per match)
- Attendance: 5,497 (916 per match)
- Top scorer: (Denmark) Lone Smidt Nielsen (3 goals)

1979 Women's Nordic Football Championship was the sixth edition of the Women's Nordic Football Championship tournament. It was held from 5 July to 8 July in Oslo, Fredrikstad and Setskog in Norway.

== Standings ==
Team	Pld	W	D	L	GF	GA	GD	Pts
Sweden	3	2	1	0	6	2	+4	5
Denmark	3	2	0	1	9	6	+3	4
Finland	3	1	1	1	2	5	−3	3
Norway	3	0	0	3	2	6	−4	0

== Results ==
5 July 1979

Finland	1–0	Norway
Leskinen ?'	Report

Lisleby Stadion, Fredrikstad
Attendance: 621
Referee: Bjørge Johansen, Norway

5 July 1979
18:30

Denmark	1–4	Sweden
Hindkjær ?'	Report	Söderström 2' 51'; Jansson 21'; Sundhage 61'

Lisleby Stadion, Fredrikstad
Attendance: 700
Referee: Gunnar Larsen, Norway

6 July 1979

Norway	0–1	Sweden
	Report	Sundhage ?'

Setskog stadion, Setskog
Attendance: 1,262
Referee: Arild Sigvaldsen, Norway

6 July 1979
17:30

Denmark	4–0	Finland
Mortensen ?'; Ehmsen ?'; Smidt Nielsen ?' ?'	Report

Setskog stadion, Setskog
Attendance: 1,000
Referee: Ivar Frederiksen, Norway

8 July 1979
13:00

Denmark	4–2	Norway
Niemann 10'; Smidt Nielsen 14'; Sværen 33' (o.g.); Mortensen 68'	Report	Kristiansen 5' (pen.); Nyborg 31'

Bislett Stadion, Oslo
Attendance: 957
Referee: Jan Erik Olsen, Norway

8 July 1979

Finland	1–1	Sweden
Kaasinen 33'	Report	Sintorn 55'

Bislett Stadion, Oslo
Attendance: 957
Referee: Rolf Nyhus, Norway

== Goalscorers ==
3 goals

- (Denmark) Lone Smidt Nielsen

2 goals

- (Denmark) Vibeke Mortensen
- (Sweden) Pia Sundhage
- (Sweden) Birgitta Söderström

1 goal

- (Denmark) Britta Ehmsen
- (Denmark) Inge Hindkjær
- (Sweden) Ann Jansson
- (Finland) Ulla Kaasinen
- (Norway) Astrid Kristiansen
- (Finland) Irmeli Leskinen
- (Denmark) Susanne Niemann
- (Norway) Gunn Lisbeth Nyborg
- (Sweden) Görel Sintorn

Own goal

- (Norway) Elin Sværen

== Sources ==
- Nordic Championships (Women) 1979 Rec.Sport.Soccer Statistics Foundation
- Lautela, Yrjö & Wallén, Göran: Rakas jalkapallo — Sata vuotta suomalaista jalkapalloa, p. 418–419. Football Association of Finland / Teos Publishing 2007. ISBN 978-951-851-068-3.
