= 1979 European Competition for Women's Football =

1979 Coppa Europa per Nazioni

Tournament details
- Host country: Italy
- Dates: 19–27 July
- Teams: 12

Final positions
- Champions: Denmark (1st title)
- Runners-up: Italy
- Third place: Sweden
- Fourth place: England

Tournament statistics
- Matches played: 16
- Goals scored: 40 (2.5 per match)

The 1979 European Competition for Women's Football was a women's football tournament contested by European nations. It took place in Italy from 19 to 27 July 1979.

The tournament featured 12 teams, with games staged in Naples and Rimini. Considered unofficial because it was not run under the auspices of UEFA, it was a precursor to the UEFA Women's Championship. Denmark won the tournament, beating hosts Italy 2–0 in the final at Stadio San Paolo.

== Tournament review ==
Economically, the tournament was not a success:

The 1979 Italian tournament is often cited as being financially disastrous, but it was not so for the participating teams. Rather, the hosts bore the costs, but the financial problems affected the organization of the competition.

In the late 1970s the issue of international tournaments for women's football teams was contentious. The international governing body International Federation of Association Football (FIFA) refused several requests to sanction independently organised tournaments, declaring that such matters "were only possible through the National Association and the Confederations." Writing in 2007, Jean Williams observed that "The fact that they had been busy not organising these events seems to have escaped [FIFA's] notice. According to Williams, FIFA's bureaucratic suppression of women's football was becoming unsustainable: "By the 1970s it simply wasn't a viable option for FIFA to ignore women playing the game and hope that they would go away."

The European Confederation, Union of European Football Associations (UEFA), displayed little enthusiasm for women's football and were particularly hostile to Italy's independent women's football federation. Sue Lopez, a member of England's squad, contended that a lack of female representation in UEFA was a contributory factor:

In 1971, UEFA had set up a committee for women's football, composed exclusively of male representatives, and by the time this committee folded in 1978 they had failed to organise any international competitions.

At a conference on 19 February 1980 UEFA resolved to launch its own competition for women's national teams. The meeting minutes had registered the 1979 competition as a "cause for concern".

== Results ==
=== First round ===
The top team in each group advanced to the semi-finals.

==== Group A ====
Team	Pld	W	D	L	GF	GA	GD	Pts
Italy	2	2	0	0	6	1	+5	4
Norway	2	1	0	1	5	3	+2	2
Northern Ireland	2	0	0	2	1	8	−7	0

18 July 1979

Italy	4–0	Northern Ireland
Morace 15', 42'; Vignotto 33'; Golin 63'	Report

Naples (Note: Erik Garin's tournament page at Rec.Sport.Soccer Statistics Foundation says Italy won this match 4–1.)
Referee: Limini (Italy)

20 July 1979

Northern Ireland	1–4	Norway
Geraldine Smith	Report	Neilsen; Nyborg; Karlsen; Opseth

Naples
Attendance: 3,000

22 July 1979

Italy	2–1	Norway
Golin 7'; Morace 68'	Report	Neilsen 55'

Benevento (Note: The Italian Football Federation report says this game took place in Benevento. The Football Association of Norway report says Naples.)
Attendance: 3,000
Referee: Beretta (Italy)

==== Group B ====
Team	Pld	W	D	L	GF	GA	GD	Pts
England	2	2	0	0	5	1	+4	4
Finland	2	0	1	1	2	4	-2	1
Switzerland	2	0	1	1	1	3	−2	1

19 July 1979

England	3–1	Finland
Chapman; ?	Report	Kaasinen

Sorrento

21 July 1979

Switzerland	1–1	Finland
Barmettler 51'	Report	Krummenacher 43' (o.g.)

Scafati

23 July 1979

England	2–0	Switzerland
Parker; ?	Report

Sorrento

==== Group C ====
Team	Pld	W	D	L	GF	GA	GD	Pts
Denmark	2	2	0	0	5	1	+4	4
France	2	0	1	1	1	3	-2	1
Scotland	2	0	1	1	0	2	−2	1

18 July 1979
21:30

Denmark	3–1	France
Niemann; Hindkjær 50'; Holst	DBU Report (in Danish); Report (in French)	Farrugia 25'

Stadio Comunale, Rimini
Attendance: 500

20 July 1979

France	0–0	Scotland
	Report (in French)

Rimini
Attendance: 650

22 July 1979
21:30

Denmark	2–0	Scotland
Hindkjær	DBU Report (in Danish)

Stadio Comunale, Riccione

==== Group D ====
Team	Pld	W	D	L	GF	GA	GD	Pts
Sweden	2	1	1	0	4	1	+3	3
Netherlands	2	1	1	0	3	1	+2	3
Wales	2	0	0	2	0	5	−5	0

19 July 1979
12:00

Sweden	3–0	Wales
Ödlund; Sintorn; Lindqvist	Report

Rimini

21 July 1979
12:00

Wales	0–2	Netherlands
	Report	De Bakker 40'; Timmer 60' (pen.)

Rimini

23 July 1979
12:00

Sweden	1–1	Netherlands
Sintorn 2'	Report	De Bakker 21'

Rimini

=== Knockout stage ===
Semi-finals
25 July – Naples
Italy	3
England	1
25 July – Rimini
Denmark	1
Sweden	0

Final
28 July – Naples
Denmark	2
Italy	0
Third place
27 July – Naples
Sweden (p)	0 (4)
England	0 (3)

==== Semi-finals ====
25 July 1979

Italy	3–1	England
Vignotto 11', 65'; Musumeci 70'	FIGC Report (in Italian)	Curl 49'

Stadio San Paolo, Naples

25 July 1979
21:30

Denmark	1–0	Sweden
Niemann 25'	DBU Report (in Danish)

Rimini
Attendance: 1,000

==== Third place match ====
27 July 1979

Sweden	0–0	England
	Report
Penalties
	4–3

Naples (Note: The Swedish Football Association list of matches says this game took place in Naples. Sue Lopez's book Women on the Ball suggests nearby Scafati.)

==== Final ====
After a goalless first half, Denmark took the lead 10 minutes into the second period through 18–year–old striker Lone Smidt Hansen (who later became Lone Smidt Nielsen through marriage). Inge Hindkjær secured Denmark's victory with her fourth goal of the tournament, four minutes from full-time. After the tournament, the Danish Football Association (DBU) were subject to media criticism for their failure to properly develop women's football.

28 July 1979
21:30

Denmark	2–0	Italy
Smidt Nielsen 51'; Hindkjær 76'	FIGC Report (in Italian); DBU Report (in Danish)

Stadio San Paolo, Naples
Attendance: 15,000
Referee: Pancani (Italy)

== Winner ==
European Competition for Women's Football
1979 winners

Denmark
First title

== Bibliography ==
- Fan, Hong; Mangan, James Anthony (2003). "Women's Football in Denmark". Soccer, Women, Sexual Liberation: Kicking Off a New Era. Routledge. ISBN 978-0714684086.
- Lopez, Sue (1997). Women on the Ball: A Guide to Women's Football. London, England: Scarlet Press. ISBN 1857270169.
- Williams, Jean (2007). A Beautiful Game: International Perspectives on Women's Football. Berg Publishers. ISBN 978-1845206758.
