= 1975 Women's Nordic Football Championship =

Tournament details
- Host country: Denmark
- Dates: 25 July – 27 July 1975
- Teams: 3
- Venue: 3 (in 3 host cities)

Final positions
- Champions: Denmark (2nd title)

Tournament statistics
- Matches played: 3
- Goals scored: 16 (5.33 per match)
- Attendance: 1,925 (642 per match)
- Top scorer(s): (Denmark) Annette Frederiksen (Denmark) Susanne Niemann (3 goals each)

1975 Women's Nordic Football Championship was the second edition of the Women's Nordic Football Championship tournament. It was held from 25 July to 27 July in Brande, Vejen and Vejle in Denmark.

== Standings ==
Team	Pld	W	D	L	GF	GA	GD	Pts
Denmark	2	2	0	0	12	0	+12	4
Sweden	2	1	0	1	4	3	+1	2
Finland	2	0	0	2	0	13	−13	0

== Results ==
25 July 1975

Finland	0–4	Sweden
	Report	Jansson 17' 44'; Sundhage 36'; Sintorn 60'

Brande Stadion, Brande
Attendance: 250
Referee: Peer Frickmann, Denmark

26 July 1975

Denmark	9–0	Finland
Niemann 4' 27' 37'; Nielsen-Mann 20' 40'; Nielsen 29'; Frederiksen 45' 67'; Toftdahl 46'	Report

Vejen Stadion, Vejen
Attendance: 575
Referee: Leif Larsen, Denmark

27 July 1975

Denmark	3–0	Sweden
Jensen Kramager 10'; Nielsen 18'; Frederiksen 65'	Report

Vejle Stadion, Vejle
Attendance: 1,100
Referee: Poul J. Jensen, Denmark

== Goalscorers ==
3 goals

- (Denmark) Annette Frederiksen
- (Denmark) Susanne Niemann

2 goals

- (Sweden) Ann Jansson
- (Denmark) Lone Nielsen
- (Denmark) Charlotte Nielsen-Mann

1 goal

- (Denmark) Bente Jensen Kramager
- (Sweden) Görel Sintorn
- (Sweden) Pia Sundhage
- (Denmark) Jeanette Toftdahl

== Sources ==
- Nordic Championships (Women) 1975 Rec.Sport.Soccer Statistics Foundation
- Landsholdsdatabasen Danish Football Association
- Lautela, Yrjö & Wallén, Göran: Rakas jalkapallo — Sata vuotta suomalaista jalkapalloa, p. 418. Football Association of Finland / Teos Publishing 2007. ISBN 978-951-851-068-3.
