= Euro 1984 =

Euro 1984 or Euro 84 may refer to:

== Association football ==
- UEFA Euro 1984, the seventh UEFA [men's] European Championship, a competition held every four years and endorsed by UEFA
- 1984 European Competition for Women's Football, the first UEFA Women's Championship
