= Pia Sundhage =

Swedish footballer and manager (born 1960)

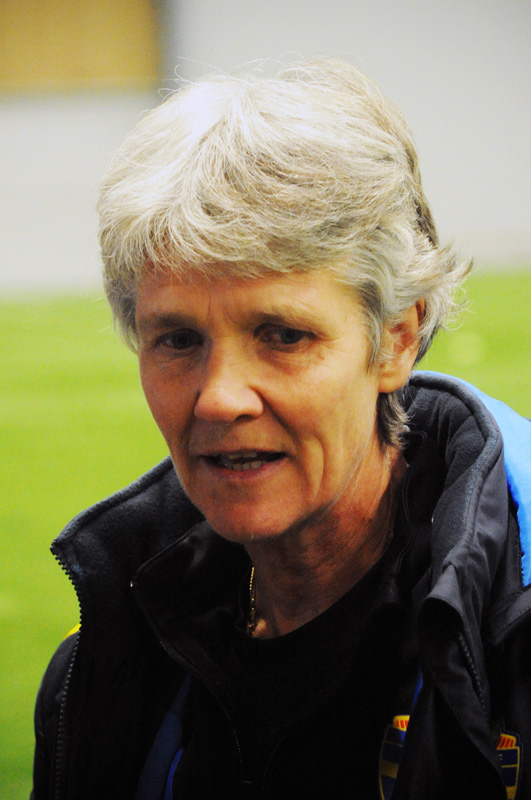
- Sundhage in 2013

Personal information
- Full name: Pia Mariane Sundhage
- Date of birth: 13 February 1960 (age 66)
- Place of birth: Ulricehamn, Sweden
- Height: 1.72 m (5 ft 8 in)
- Position: Forward

Team information
- Current team: Haiti (manager)

Youth career
- 1975: IFK Ulricehamn
- 1975–1976: SGU Falköping

Senior career*
Years	Team	Apps	(Gls)
1977–1978	Falköpings KIK	3	(2)
1979–1981	Jitex BK	54	(86)
1982–1983	Östers IF	40	(65)
1984	Jitex BK	18	(33)
1985	Lazio	23	(16)
1985	Stattena IF		
1985	Jitex BK	9	(4)
1986	Hammarby IF	18	(17)
1987–1989	Jitex BK	65	(41)
1990–1996	Hammarby IF	111	(21)

International career
1975–1996	Sweden	146	(71)

Managerial career
- 1992–1994: Hammarby IF (player-manager)
- 1998–1999: Vallentuna BK (assistant)
- 2000: AIK Fotboll Dam (assistant)
- 2001–2002: Philadelphia Charge (assistant)
- 2003: Boston Breakers
- 2004: Kolbotn Fotball
- 2005–2006: KIF Örebro DFF
- 2007: China (assistant)
- 2007–2012: United States
- 2012–2017: Sweden
- 2018–2019: Sweden U-17
- 2019–2023: Brazil
- 2024–2025: Switzerland
- 2026–: Haiti
- * Club domestic league appearances and goals

Pia Mariane Sundhage (Swedish pronunciation: [ˈpîːa ˈsɵ̂nːdˌhɑːɡɛ], born 13 February 1960) is a Swedish football manager and former player who currently manages the Haiti national team. As a player, Sundhage played most of her career as a forward and retired as the top scorer for the Sweden national team.

Sundhage was the head coach of the United States national team from 2008 to 2012 and led the team to two Olympic gold medals and a silver medal at the World Cup. Her success led to her winning the 2012 FIFA World Coach of the Year. Sundhage later became the head coach of her native Sweden from 2012 to 2017, winning an Olympic silver medal in 2016. She coached the Brazil national team from 2019 to 2023. She later managed Switzerland, the hosts of the UEFA Women's Euro 2025.

== Club career ==
Sundhage started with IFK Ulricehamn as a youth player and eventually moved to Falköpings KIK in 1978. She then joined Jitex BK from 1979 to 1981. Sundhage played 1982 to 1983 with Östers IF, scoring 30 times in her first season with the club and chipping in 35 more in her second season. 1984 saw a move back to Jitex BK, while 1985 saw Sundhage split time between Stattena IF, Lazio (where she scored 17 times), and Jitex BK. She played the 1986 season with Hammarby IF, before she moved back to Jitex BK from 1979 through 1989. Sundhage finished her career with Hammarby IF DFF, playing from 1990 until she retired in 1996.

She won four Damallsvenskan championships, all with Jitex BK, as well as two additional Svenska Cupen with the club. She also won two Svenska Cupen with Hammarby IF DFF.

== International career ==
Sundhage made her first appearance for the Sweden national team as a 15-year-old in 1975, eventually amassing 146 caps and scoring 71 goals for her country. Her 71 goals gave her joint-lead with Lena Videkull for the most in the Sweden national team history, a record which has since been surpassed by both Hanna Ljungberg and Lotta Schelin.

She participated for Sweden in the 1991 (a third-place finish) and 1995 editions of the FIFA Women's World Cup and the 1996 Summer Olympics. She won, and was the top scorer, in the 1984 UEFA Women's Championship. Her image appeared on a Swedish postage stamp in 1988. In 1989 Sundhage scored the first goal in a women's match at Wembley Stadium, as Sweden beat England 2–0 in a curtain–raiser for the Rous Cup.

In 2000, Sundhage finished sixth in the voting for FIFA Women's Player of the Century.

== Coaching career ==
=== Pre-United States ===
Sundhage got her start in coaching as a player/manager when she was with Hammarby IF from 1992 to 1994. She then took assistants jobs with Vallentuna BK (1998 to 1999) and AIK Fotboll Dam (2000) before moving across the Atlantic Ocean to become an assistant with Philadelphia Charge of the new Women's United Soccer Association in the United States. She eventually was hired on by Boston Breakers as the head coach, winning the league title and being named the 2003 WUSA Coach of the Year in the process. Once the WUSA folded however, it was back to Scandinavia to take on further coaching positions.

Her relationship with the Boston Breakers led United States women's national team captain Kristine Lilly and fellow USWNT player Kate Markgraf joining her in the Swedish Damallsvenskan when Pia coached KIF Örebro DFF from 2005 to 2006, after a brief stint with Kolbotn IL in 2004. Lilly said she "wanted to play for Pia again."

Sundhage served as an assistant to Marika Domanski-Lyfors for the China Women's national team during the 2007 FIFA Women's World Cup.

=== United States women's national team ===
Pia Sundhage was announced as the United States women's national team head coach on 13 November 2007. She became the seventh head coach in the U.S. team's history and the third woman. Lauren Gregg was in charge for 3 games in 2000, April Heinrichs led the squad from 2000–2004 and won the 2004 Summer Olympics, while Sundhage served as a scout for the United States during the 2004 Olympics.

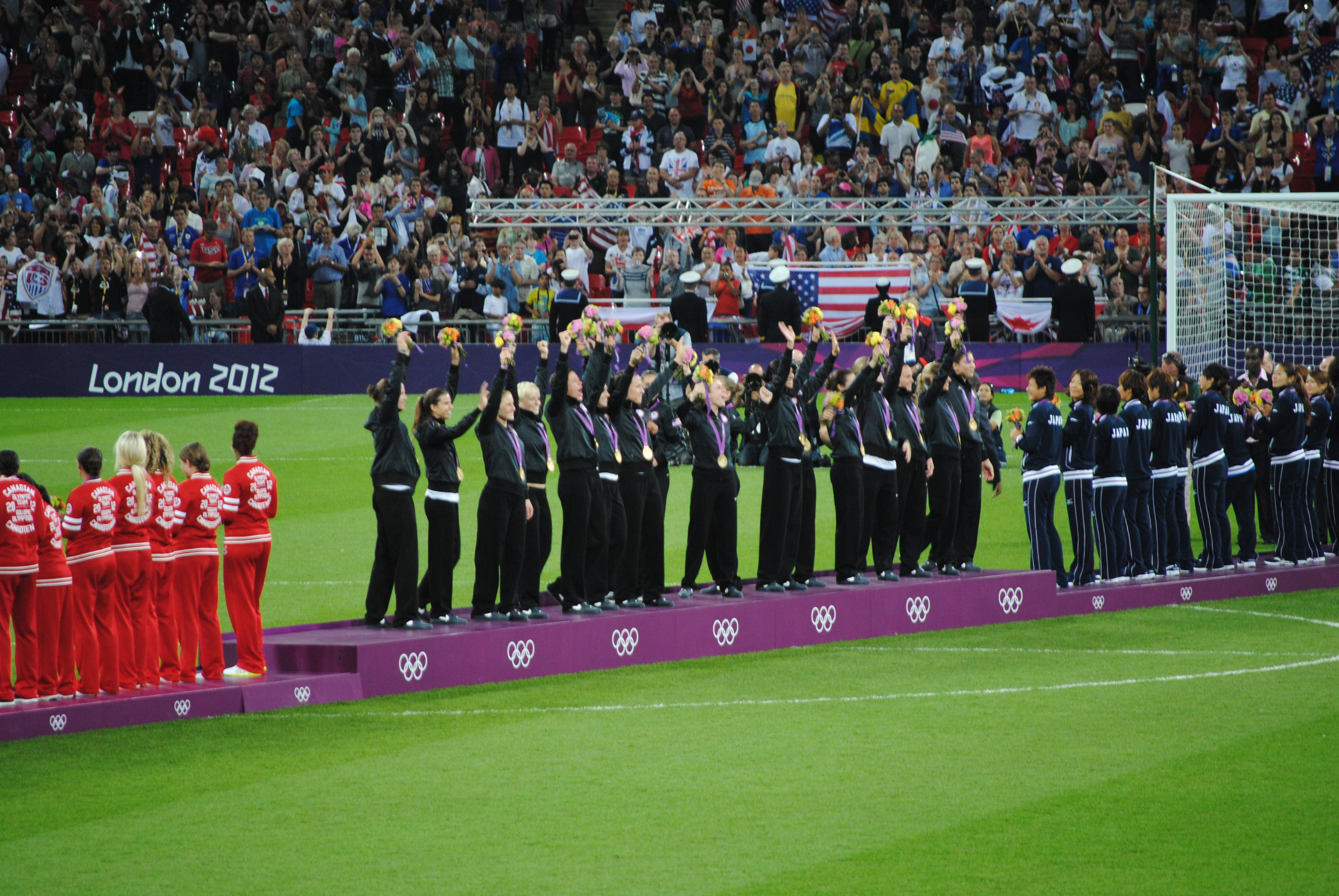
United States women's national team at the 2012 Summer Olympics

While at the helm of the United States, Sundhage won the 2008 Algarve Cup and gold medals at both the 2008 Summer Olympics and the 2012 Summer Olympics. She was on the verge of winning the 2009 Algarve Cup, but the United States lost out to Sundhage's native Sweden on penalties. However, she did win the 2010 Algarve Cup a year later, defeating World and European Champions Germany 3–2 in the final.

She coached the women's team to the final of the 2011 FIFA Women's World Cup, where the team advanced to the final for the first time since 1999. However, they were upset by Japan, losing 3–1 on penalty kicks after a 2-2 draw. A year later, Sundhage coached the USWNT to another gold medal at the 2012 Summer Olympics in London, defeating Japan 2–1 in a Women's World Cup final rematch, with Carli Lloyd scoring both goals.

On 1 September 2012, Sundhage announced she was stepping down as the U.S women's head coach having expressed a desire to seek opportunities in her native Sweden. Sundhage announced she would coach the U.S. team's games on 16 and 19 September on the team's Olympic victory tour before officially resigning. "I have days where I think, 'What am I doing?' and there are other days where I'm like, 'I'm all up for this next challenge'" Sundhage said upon announcing her departing the US women's national team. She coached her last game against Australia as part the team's Olympic victory tour on 19 September, defeating them 6–2. With this final win Sundhage was able to leave the team with a 91–6–10 win–loss–tie record that included two Olympic gold medals and a second-place finish at the 2011 FIFA Women's World Cup.

=== Sweden women's national team ===
The Swedish Football Association announced early 2 September 2012 that Sundhage signed a four-year contract that starts on 1 December. The announcement came hours after Sundhage's match as coach of the U.S. women's team, an 8–0 win in a friendly match against Costa Rica; the first of a series organized to celebrate the winning of gold medal at the 2012 London Olympics. Sundhage replaced Thomas Dennerby, who resigned after Sweden failed to reach the semifinals in 2012 Olympics. "I have long dreamed of becoming Sweden coach and now I am so happy" Sundhage said. Sundhage's first major tournament as coach of the Sweden team was the 2013 European championship, which Sweden hosted; Sweden lost 0–1 in the semi-final to Germany, which won the championship. In the 2015 FIFA Women's World Cup, Sweden advanced from their group after 3 consecutive draws (including a scoreless draw with eventual champions USA, but lost 4-1 to Germany in the Round of 16.

At the 2016 Summer Olympics, Sundhage's Sweden started slow, following up an opening 1-0 win over South Africa with a 1-5 loss vs the hosts (and her future employers), Brazil. However, a scoreless draw against China enabled Sweden to advance to the quarterfinals on a tiebreaker, where her team faced her former USA squad. Deploying defense-first tactics (Note: Sweden's defensive setup also drew angry postgame remarks from Hope Solo, Sundhage's former longtime goalkeeper at the USWNT, which resulted in an end to Solo's international career.) and very physical play, Sweden neutralized the top-ranked American attack, capitalized on a breakaway at 61', and held on through extra time to win in a penalty shootout. The victory marked the first instance of the USA being eliminated before reaching the medal rounds at the Olympics. Sweden would go on to a rematch with Brazil in the semifinals, which they would also win in penalties after a scoreless draw. With a 2-1 defeat to Germany in the Gold Medal match, Sweden won their first Olympic medal in women's football.

After a disappointing quarterfinal exit in the UEFA Women's Euro 2017 tournament, in August 2017, Sundhage stepped down as coach of the women's national team, a move which had been announced the previous Fall. In November 2017, the Swedish Football Association announced the appointment of Sundhage as the new Sweden women's national under-17 football team head coach. Sundhage took over her new duties on 1 January 2018.

=== Brazil women's national team ===
In July 2019, Sundhage accepted an invitation from the Brazilian Football Confederation (CBF) to become the new coach of the Brazil women's national football team, being the first none Brazilian to occupy this position. She was let go after a disappointing performance of Brazil's team at the 2023 FIFA Women's World Cup.

=== Swiss women's national team ===
Sundhage has coached the Swiss national team since 2024. The team surprised with a respectable performance against Spain in the quarter finals of the UEFA Women's Euro 2025 which took place in Switzerland.

=== Haitian women's national team ===
Sundhage became coach of the Haitian women's national team on the 13th of February 2026

== Personal life ==
In January 2010, Sundhage mentioned in a Swedish TV interview that as a lesbian she has not felt any homophobia as a coach. "There has been no problem for me to be openly gay as head coach in the U.S.," said Sundhage.

== Career statistics ==
=== Matches and goals scored at World Cup and Olympic tournaments ===
Key (expand for notes on "world cup and olympic goals")
Location	Geographic location of the venue where the competition occurred
Lineup	Start – played entire match on minute (off player) – substituted on at the minute indicated, and player was substituted off at the same time off minute (on player) – substituted off at the minute indicated, and player was substituted on at the same time (c) – captain
Min	The minute in the match the goal was scored. For list that include caps, blank indicates played in the match but did not score a goal.
Assist/pass	The ball was passed by the player, which assisted in scoring the goal. This column depends on the availability and source of this information.
penalty or pk	Goal scored on penalty-kick which was awarded due to foul by opponent. (Goals scored in penalty-shoot-out, at the end of a tied match after extra-time, are not included.)
Score	The match score after the goal was scored.
Result	The final score. W – match was won L – match was lost to opponent D – match was drawn (W) – penalty-shoot-out was won after a drawn match (L) – penalty-shoot-out was lost after a drawn match
aet	The score at the end of extra-time; the match was tied at the end of 90' regulation
pso	Penalty-shoot-out score shown in parentheses; the match was tied at the end of extra-time
	Pink background color – Olympic women's football tournament
	Blue background color – FIFA women's world cup final tournament

Goal	Match	Date	Location	Opponent	Lineup	Min	Score	Result	Competition
China 1991 FIFA Women's World Cup
	1	1991-11-17	Panyu	United States	Start			2–3 L	Group match
1	2	1991-11-19	Foshan	Japan	Start	34	6–0	8–0 W	Group match
2	3	1991-11-21	Panyu	Brazil	Start	42	1-0	2–0 W	Group match
3	4	1991-11-24	Guangzhou	China	Start	3	1-0	1–0 W	Quarter-Final
	5	1991-11-27	Panyu	Norway	Start			1–4 L	Semi-Final
4	6	1991-11-29	Guangzhou	Germany	Start	11	2-0	4–0 W	3rd Place Match
Sweden 1995 FIFA Women's World Cup
	7	1995-6-5	Helsingborg	Brazil	Start			0–1 L	Group match
5	8	1995-6-7	Helsingborg	Germany	Start	80	2-2	3–2 W	Group match
	9	1995-6-9	Västerås	Japan	Start			2–0 W	Group match
	10	1995-6-13	Helsingborg	China	Start			1–1 (pso 3–4) (L)	Quarter-Final
(United States) Atlanta 1996 Women's Olympic Football Tournament
	11	1996-7-21	Miami	China	Start			0–2 L	Group match
	12	1996-7-23	Orlando	United States	Start			1–2 L	Group match
	13	1996-7-25	Orlando	Denmark	Start			3–1 W	Group match

=== Matches and goals scored at European Championship tournaments ===
Goal	Match	Date	Location	Opponent	Lineup	Min	Score	Result	Competition
1984 European Championship
1	1	1984-3-1	Rome	Italy	Start	50	2-2	3–2 W	Semi-Final 1st Leg
2	2	1984-4-1	Linköping	Italy	Start	57	2-1	2–1 W	Semi-Final 2nd Leg
3	3	1984-5-27	Gothenburg	England	Start	57	1-0	1–0 W	Final 1st Leg
	4	1984-5-27	Luton	England	Start			0–1 L (Note: The 1984 European Championship was won by Sweden on penalty kicks when both legs ended 1-0.)	Final 2nd Leg
(Norway) 1987 European Championship
	5	1987-6-11	Moss	England	Start			3–2 W	Semi-Final
	6	1987-6-14	Oslo	Norway	Start			1–2 L	Final
(Germany) 1989 European Championship
	7	1989-6-28	Lüdenscheid	Norway	Start			1–2 L	Semi-Final
4	8	1989-6-30	Osnabrück	Italy	Start	43	1-1	2–1 W	3rd Place Match
1995 European Championship
	9	1995-2-26	Kristiansand	Norway	Start			3–4 L	Semi-Final 1st Leg
	10	1995-3-5	Jönköping	Norway	Start			4–1 W	Semi-Final 2nd Leg
	11	1995-3-26	Kaiserslautern	Germany	Start			2–3 L	Final

== International goals ==
No.	Date	Venue	Opponent	Score	Result	Competition	Ref.
1.	25 July 1975	Brande Stadion, Brande, Denmark	Finland	2–0	4–0	1975 Women's Nordic Football Championship	
2.	7 September 1975	Plough Lane, Wimbledon, England	England	1–1	3–1	Friendly	
3.	8 July 1977	Mariehamns IP, Mariehamn, Finland	Finland	4–0	4–0	1977 Women's Nordic Football Championship	
4.	5 July 1979	Lisleby Stadion, Fredrikstad, Norway	Denmark	4–1	4–1	1979 Women's Nordic Football Championship	
5.	6 July 1979	Setskog stadion, Setskog, Norway	Norway	1–0	1–0	1979 Women's Nordic Football Championship	
6.	28 June 1980	Norrvalla IP, Skellefteå, Sweden	France	2–0	2–2	Friendly	
7.	10 July 1980	Kvarnbyvallen, Mölndal, Sweden	Finland	2–0	7–0	1980 Women's Nordic Football Championship	
8.	10 July 1980	Kvarnbyvallen, Mölndal, Sweden	Finland	6–0	7–0	1980 Women's Nordic Football Championship	
9.	10 July 1980	Kvarnbyvallen, Mölndal, Sweden	Finland	7–0	7–0	1980 Women's Nordic Football Championship	
10.	11 July 1980	Prästängen, Öckerö, Sweden	Norway	1–1	2–2	1980 Women's Nordic Football Championship	
11.	25 April 1981	Sportpark 't Alterbarg, Zweeloo, Netherlands	Netherlands	1–1	1–2	Friendly	
12.	23 May 1981	Stade de la Fobio, Montauban, France	France	1–0	6–1	Friendly	
13.	23 May 1981	Stade de la Fobio, Montauban, France	France	3–0	6–1	Friendly	
14.	23 May 1981	Stade de la Fobio, Montauban, France	France	4–0	6–1	Friendly	
15.	23 May 1981	Stade de la Fobio, Montauban, France	France	6–0	6–1	Friendly	
16.	17 July 1981	Urheilupuisto, Hyvinkää, Finland	Finland	1–0	2–0	1981 Women's Nordic Football Championship	
17.	19 July 1981	Töölön Pallokenttä, Helsinki, Finland	Denmark	2–0	2–1	1981 Women's Nordic Football Championship	
18.	26 September 1981	Ryavallen, Borås, Sweden	Netherlands	6–0	7–0	Friendly	
19.	26 May 1982	Viskavallen, Kinna, Sweden	England	1–1	1–1	Friendly	
20.	9 September 1982	Kópavogsvöllur, Kópavogur, Iceland	Iceland	4–0	6–0	1984 European Competition for Women's Football qualifying	
21.	10 August 1983	Rådavallen, Mellerud, Sweden	Denmark	1–0	2–1	Friendly	
22.	10 August 1983	Rådavallen, Mellerud, Sweden	Denmark	2–1	2–1	Friendly	
23.	24 August 1983	Brunnsvallen, Ronneby, Sweden	Iceland	1–0	5–0	1984 European Competition for Women's Football qualifying	
24.	24 August 1983	Brunnsvallen, Ronneby, Sweden	Iceland	2–0	5–0	1984 European Competition for Women's Football qualifying	
25.	8 April 1984	Stadio Flaminio, Rome, Italy	Italy	2–2	3–2	1984 European Competition for Women's Football	
26.	28 April 1984	Folkungavallen, Linköping, Sweden	Italy	1–0	2–1	1984 European Competition for Women's Football	
27.	28 April 1984	Folkungavallen, Linköping, Sweden	Italy	2–1	2–1	1984 European Competition for Women's Football	
28.	12 May 1984	Ullevi, Gothenburg, Sweden	England	1–0	1–0	1984 European Competition for Women's Football	
29.	11 June 1985	Olympia, Helsingborg, Sweden	Netherlands	1–0	2–0	1987 European Competition for Women's Football qualifying	
30.	9 October 1985	Stadsparksvallen, Jönköping, Sweden	Belgium	3–0	5–0	1987 European Competition for Women's Football qualifying	
31.	9 October 1985	Stadsparksvallen, Jönköping, Sweden	Belgium	4–0	5–0	1987 European Competition for Women's Football qualifying	
32.	7 May 1986	Krohnsminde, Bergen, Norway	Norway	3–2	3–2	Friendly	
33.	11 July 1987	Minneapolis, United States	United States U-19	3–0	5–1	Friendly	
34.	19 August 1987	Folkungavallen, Nyköping, Sweden	Hungary	1–0	5–0	Friendly	
35.	27 April 1988	Vä IP, Kristianstad, Sweden	Switzerland	2–0	3–0	Friendly	
36.	8 June 1988	Tianhe Stadium, Guangzhou, China	Canada	1–0	1–0	1988 FIFA Women's Invitation Tournament	
37.	18 September 1988	Lekevi IP, Mariestad, Sweden	Republic of Ireland	1–0	4–0	1989 European Competition for Women's Football qualifying	
38.	18 September 1988	Lekevi IP, Mariestad, Sweden	Republic of Ireland	4–0	4–0	1989 European Competition for Women's Football qualifying	
39.	15 October 1988	Odense Stadium, Odense, Denmark	Denmark	3–0	5–1	1989 European Competition for Women's Football qualifying	
40.	11 March 1989	Stade Louison Bobet, Levallois-Perret, France	France	1–0	2–1	Friendly	
41.	26 April 1989	Strandängens IP, Bromölla, Sweden	Finland	3–0	4–1	Friendly	
42.	23 May 1989	Wembley Stadium, London, England	England	1–0	2–0	Friendly	
43.	30 June 1989	Stadion an der Bremer Brücke, Osnabrück, Germany	Italy	1–1	2–1	1989 European Competition for Women's Football	
44.	10 August 1989	Petalax IP, Petalax, Finland	Finland	2–0	2–0	Friendly	
45.	13 May 1990	Stade Municipal de Melun, Melun, France	France	1–0	2–0	UEFA Women's Euro 1991 qualifying	
46.	13 May 1990	Stade Municipal de Melun, Melun, France	France	2–0	2–0	UEFA Women's Euro 1991 qualifying	
47.	10 June 1990	Stadion OSiR, Gorzów Wielkopolski, Poland	Poland	1–0	2–0	UEFA Women's Euro 1991 qualifying	
48.	19 September 1990	Örjans Vall, Halmstad, Sweden	Italy	3–0	4–0	Friendly	
49.	19 September 1990	Örjans Vall, Halmstad, Sweden	Italy	4–0	4–0	Friendly	
50.	14 October 1990	Lekevi IP, Mariestad, Sweden	France	4–1	4–1	UEFA Women's Euro 1991 qualifying	
51.	18 November 1990	Malmö Stadion, Malmö, Sweden	Italy	1–0	1–1	UEFA Women's Euro 1991 qualifying	
52.	26 February 1991	Estádio de Troia, Tróia Peninsula, Portugal	Finland	1–0	3–0	Friendly tournament	
53.	26 February 1991	Estádio de Troia, Tróia Peninsula, Portugal	Finland	3–0	3–0	Friendly tournament	
54.	28 February 1991	Estádio de Troia, Tróia Peninsula, Portugal	Denmark	2–0	2–3	Friendly tournament	
55.	21 August 1991	Nösnäsvallen, Stenungsund, Sweden	Soviet Union	2–0	2–0	Friendly	
56.	9 October 1991	Ryavallen, Borås, Sweden	Netherlands	1–0	3–1	Friendly	
57.	9 October 1991	Ryavallen, Borås, Sweden	Netherlands	3–0	3–1	Friendly	
58.	23 October 1991	Nou Estadi de Palamós, Palamós, Spain	Spain	3–0	4–0	UEFA Women's Euro 1993 qualifying	
59.	19 November 1991	New Plaza Stadium, Foshan, China	Japan	6–0	8–0	1991 FIFA Women's World Cup	
60.	21 November 1991	Ying Tung Stadium, Guangzhou, China	Brazil	1–0	2–0	1991 FIFA Women's World Cup	
61.	24 November 1991	Tianhe Stadium, Guangzhou, China	China	1–0	1–0	1991 FIFA Women's World Cup	
62.	29 November 1991	Guangdong Provincial Stadium, Guangzhou, China	Germany	2–0	4–0	1991 FIFA Women's World Cup	
63.	9 March 1993	Municipal Stadium Georgios Katsouris Kastros, Ayia Napa, Cyprus	France	3–1	3–1	Friendly tournament	
64.	13 May 1995	Örjans Vall, Halmstad, Sweden	England	4–0	4–0	Friendly	
65.	7 June 1995	Olympia, Helsingborg, Sweden	Germany	2–2	3–2	1995 FIFA Women's World Cup	
66.	30 August 1995	Jakobstads Centralplan, Jakobstad, Finland	Finland	1–0	3–1	Friendly	
67.	30 September 1995	Hjørring Stadium, Hjørring, Denmark	Denmark	2–1	2–1	UEFA Women's Euro 1997 qualifying	
68.	11 March 1996	Estádio Municipal de Lagos, Lagos, Portugal	Denmark	1–0	2–1	1996 Algarve Cup	
69.	12 May 1996	Gutavallen, Visby, Sweden	Spain	1–0	1–1	UEFA Women's Euro 1997 qualifying	
70.	2 June 1996	Estadio Guillermo Olagüe, Gandia, Spain	Spain	2–0	8–0	UEFA Women's Euro 1997 qualifying	
71.	2 June 1996	Estadio Guillermo Olagüe, Gandia, Spain	Spain	4–0	8–0	UEFA Women's Euro 1997 qualifying	

== Managerial statistics ==
All competitive league games (league and domestic cup) and international matches (including friendlies) are included.

As of 18 July 2025

Team	Nat	Year	Record				
Team	Nat	Year	G	W	D	L	Win %
Hammarby IF	(Sweden)	1992–1994	66	33	13	20	50.00
Boston Breakers	(United States)	2003	21	10	7	4	47.62
Kolbotn	(Norway)	2004	18	9	1	8	50.00
Örebro DFF	(Sweden)	2005–2006	44	16	11	17	36.36
United States women	(United States)	2007–2012	107	91	10	6	85.05
Sweden women	(Sweden)	2012–2017	39	20	8	11	51.28
Brazil women	(Brazil)	2019–2023	58	36	12	10	62.07
Switzerland women	(Switzerland)	2024–2026	21	7	3	11	33.33
Haiti women	(Haiti)	2026–Present	0	0	0	0	—
Career total			374	222	65	87	59.36

== Honours ==
=== Player ===
Jitex BK

- Damallsvenskan: 1979, 1981, 1984, 1989
- Svenska Cupen: 1981, 1984

Hammarby IF DFF

- Svenska Cupen: 1994, 1995

Sweden

- FIFA Women's World Cup: third place 1991
- UEFA European Women's Championship: 1984; runner-up 1987, 1995; third place 1989
- European Competition for Women's Football: third place 1979 (non-official competition)
- Women's Nordic Football Championship: 1977, 1978, 1979, 1980, 1981; runner-up 1982
- Algarve Cup: 1995
- Cyprus Tournament: 1990, 1992
- North America Cup: 1987

Individual

- European Competition for Women's Football top scorer: 1984
- European Competition for Women's Football best player: 1984
- Damallsvenskan top scorer: 1982, 1983
- Women's Nordic Football Championship top scorer

=== Managerial ===
United States Women

- Olympic Gold Medal: 2008, 2012
- FIFA Women's World Cup: runner-up 2011
- Four Nations Tournament: 2008, 2011
- Algarve Cup: 2008, 2010, 2011

Sweden Women

- Olympic Silver Medal: 2016

Brazil Women

- Torneio Internacional de Futebol Feminino: 2021
- Copa América Femenina: 2022

Individual

- FIFA World Women's Coach of the year: 2012; finalist 2010, 2011, 2013
- Best FIFA Women's Coach: finalist 2016
- 2003 WUSA Coach of the Year

== Awards ==
Sundhage was awarded the Illis quorum in the eighth size by the Swedish government in 2021.

== See also ==
- List of women's footballers with 100 or more international caps
- List of UEFA Women's Championship goalscorers
- List of UEFA Women's Championship records
- List of women's Olympic football tournament records and statistics
- List of LGBT sportspeople
