= Marko Saloranta =

Finnish football manager (born 1972)

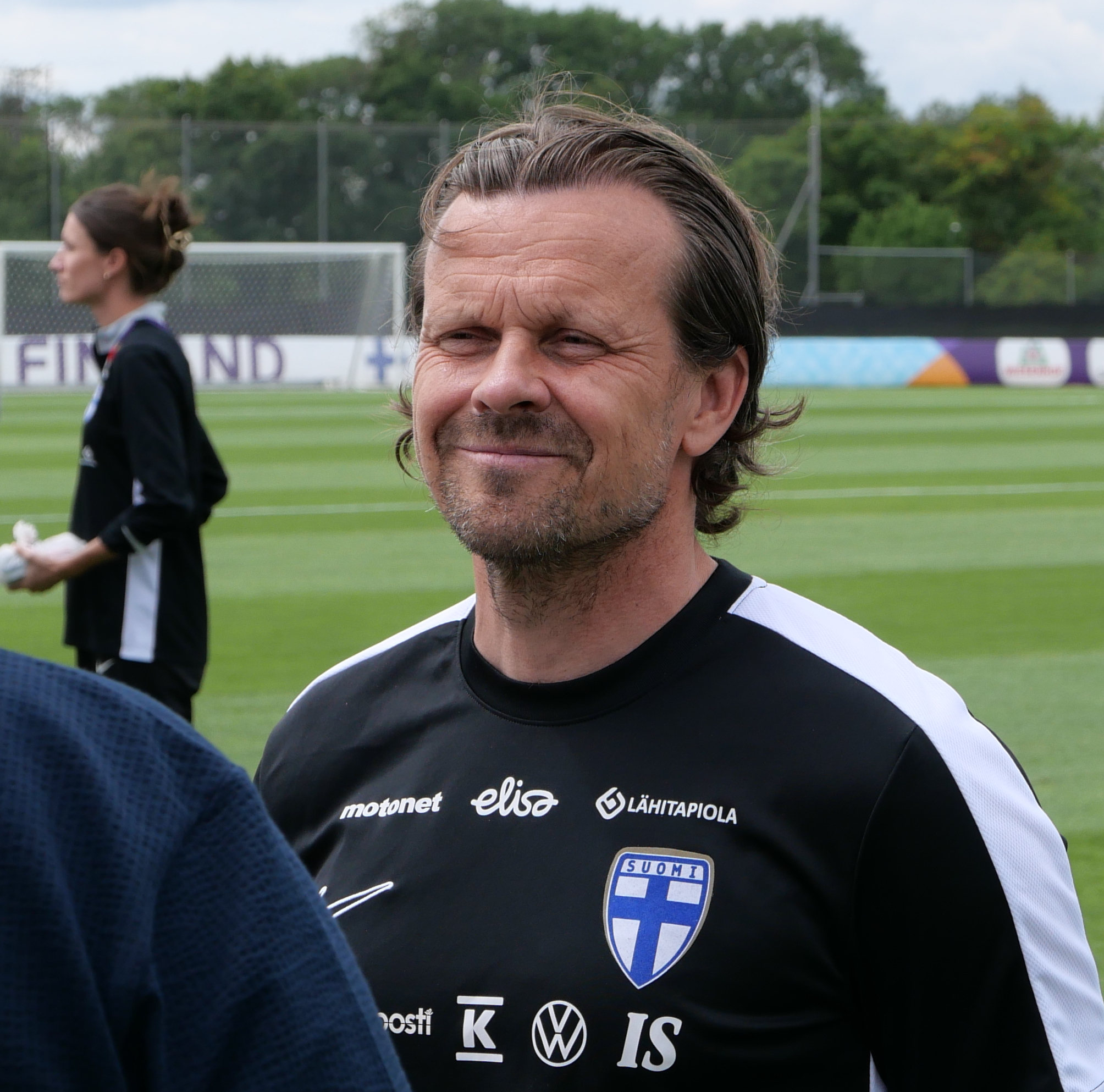
- Saloranta during a public training in Versoix during the UEFA Women's Euro 2025.

Personal information
- Date of birth: 31 March 1972 (age 54)
- Place of birth: Raisio, Finland

Team information
- Current team: Finland (manager)

Senior career*
Years	Team	Apps	(Gls)
- RaPS
- MaPS

Managerial career
- MaPS
- SC Raisio (women)
- 2005–2010: Honka
- 2009: Finland women (assistant)
- 2011–2019: Finland women U16
- 2011–2022: Finland women U17
- 2013: Finland women (assistant)
- 2017: Finland women (interim)
- 2022: Finland women (interim)
- 2023–: Finland women
- * Club domestic league appearances and goals as of 22 February 2024

Marko Saloranta (born 31 March 1972) is a Finnish football manager and a former player. Since the start of 2023, he is serving as the head coach of the Finland women's national team, having previously worked as an interim manager for the team in 2017 and 2022.

== Career ==
Saloranta started coaching in Maskun Palloseura, from where he continued to the women's team of SC Raisio.

During 2005–2010, he worked as the head coach of Honka in Finnish Naisten Liiga.

Saloranta has had an extensive career in Finnish women's football, having worked for over 15 years with Finland's women's and girls' national teams.

He also coached Finland U17 national team at the 2018 FIFA U-17 Women's World Cup in Uruguay.

He led Finland national team in the UEFA Women's Euro 2025 qualifying campaign, where they qualified for the final tournament, after defeating Scotland in the play-offs.
