= Jette Hansen =

Danish footballer (born 1953)

Personal information
- Date of birth: 17 November 1953 (age 72)
- Position: Defender

Senior career*
Years	Team	Apps	(Gls)
–1985	BK Rødovre		
1985–1987	Nakskov BK		
- B 1909

International career
1980–1987	Denmark	33	(2)
- * Club domestic league appearances and goals

Jette Hansen (born 17 November 1953) is a Danish footballer who played as a defender for the Denmark women's national football team. She was part of the team at the 1984 European Competition for Women's Football. At the club level she played for Boldklubben Rødovre in Denmark.
