= Kirsten Fabrin =

Danish footballer (born 1953)

Personal information
- Birth name: Kirsten Drost
- Date of birth: 20 December 1953 (age 72)
- Place of birth: Denmark
- Position: Midfielder

Senior career*
Years	Team	Apps	(Gls)
1972–	B 1909		

International career^{‡}
	Denmark	19	(3)
- * Club domestic league appearances and goals ‡ National team caps and goals as of 8 April 1984 (before the 1984 European Competition for Women's Football)

Kirsten Fabrin (née Drost; born 20 December 1953) is a Danish footballer who played as a midfielder for the Denmark women's national football team. She was part of the team at the 1984 European Competition for Women's Football. At the club level she played for Danish A-Liga club B 1909 in Denmark.
