= Ejner Jensen =

Danish footballer (1929–2020)

Personal information
- Date of birth: 6 October 1929
- Date of death: 17 December 2020 (aged 91)

Senior career*
Years	Team	Apps	(Gls)
	Vanløse IF	300+	

International career
1955	Denmark	1	(0)
- * Club domestic league appearances and goals

Ejner Jensen (6 October 1929 – 17 December 2020) was a Danish footballer. He played in one match for the Denmark national football team in 1955.

Jensen played his entire career for Vanløse IF, becoming the club's first ever national team player, and making over 300 appearances for the club. Jensen helped the club qualify for the second division for the first time in the club's history. Vanløse IF's membership in the "Alliance" helped the national selection identify Jensen as a potential national team player.

He appeared in only one national team match, a 1–1 draw against Norway in Oslo in 1955. He also won two caps for the National B team in 1955 and 1957.
