= Wiklöf Holding Arena =

Sports stadium in Åland, Finland

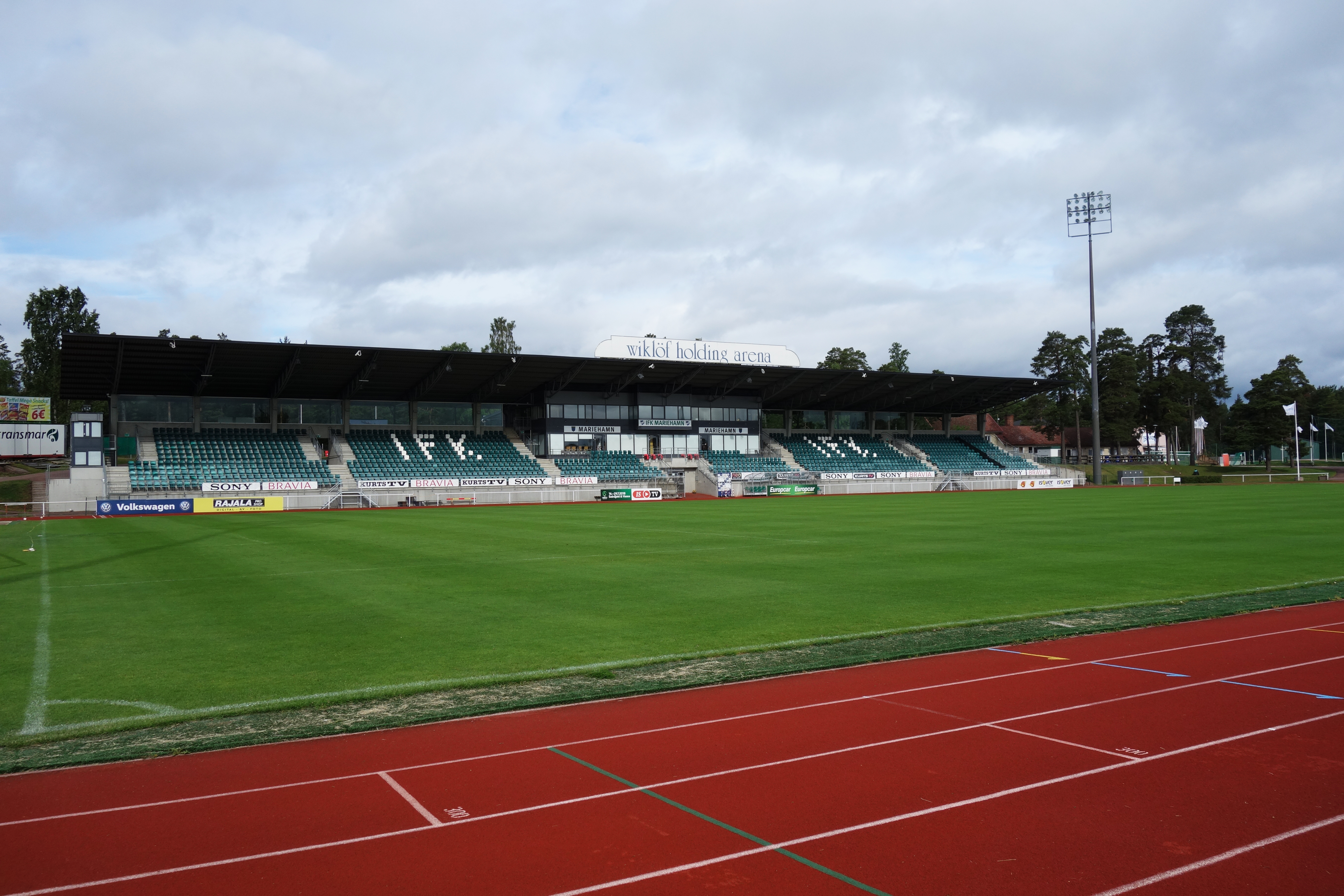
- Interactive map of Wiklöf Holding Arena
- Former names: Idrottsparken
- Location: Mariehamn, Åland
- Coordinates: 60°06′08″N 19°56′07″E
- Capacity: 1 635

Construction
- Opened: 1932
- Renovated: 2022

Tenant
- IFK Mariehamn

Wiklöf Holding Arena (located in Idrottsparken) is a multi-purpose stadium in Mariehamn, Finland. It is used mostly for football matches and is the home ground of IFK Mariehamn and Åland United.

The stadium has a capacity of 1,635 seats, with standing places increasing the total capacity up to 4,500. The first stadium was built in 1932.
