= Henning Lund-Sørensen =

Danish football referee (born 1942)

Henning Lund-Sørensen (born 20 March 1942) is a Danish retired football referee from Aarhus. He is known for having refereed one match in the 1982 FIFA World Cup in Spain, between the host nation and Yugoslavia, where he awarded a penalty to Spain for a foul committed by Velimir Zajec 1.5 meters outside the penalty box. When the penalty attempt was stopped by Yugoslavian goalkeeper Dragan Pantelić, he ordered it to be retaken due to alleged encroachment, whereupon it was scored by Juanito.
