= Kolding Stadium =

Football stadium in Kolding, Denmark

Kolding Stadion
- Autocentral Park
- Interactive map of Kolding Stadion
- Full name: Autocentral Park
- Location: Marcus Allé 30; 6000 Kolding
- Coordinates: 55°29′39″N 9°27′33″E
- Owner: Kolding Municipality
- Capacity: 10,000 (2,197 seated)
- Surface: Grass
- Field size: 105 × 68 m

Construction
- Opened: 1931
- Renovated: 1972, 2006

Tenants
- Kolding IF (1931–present); Kolding FC (2002–2013)

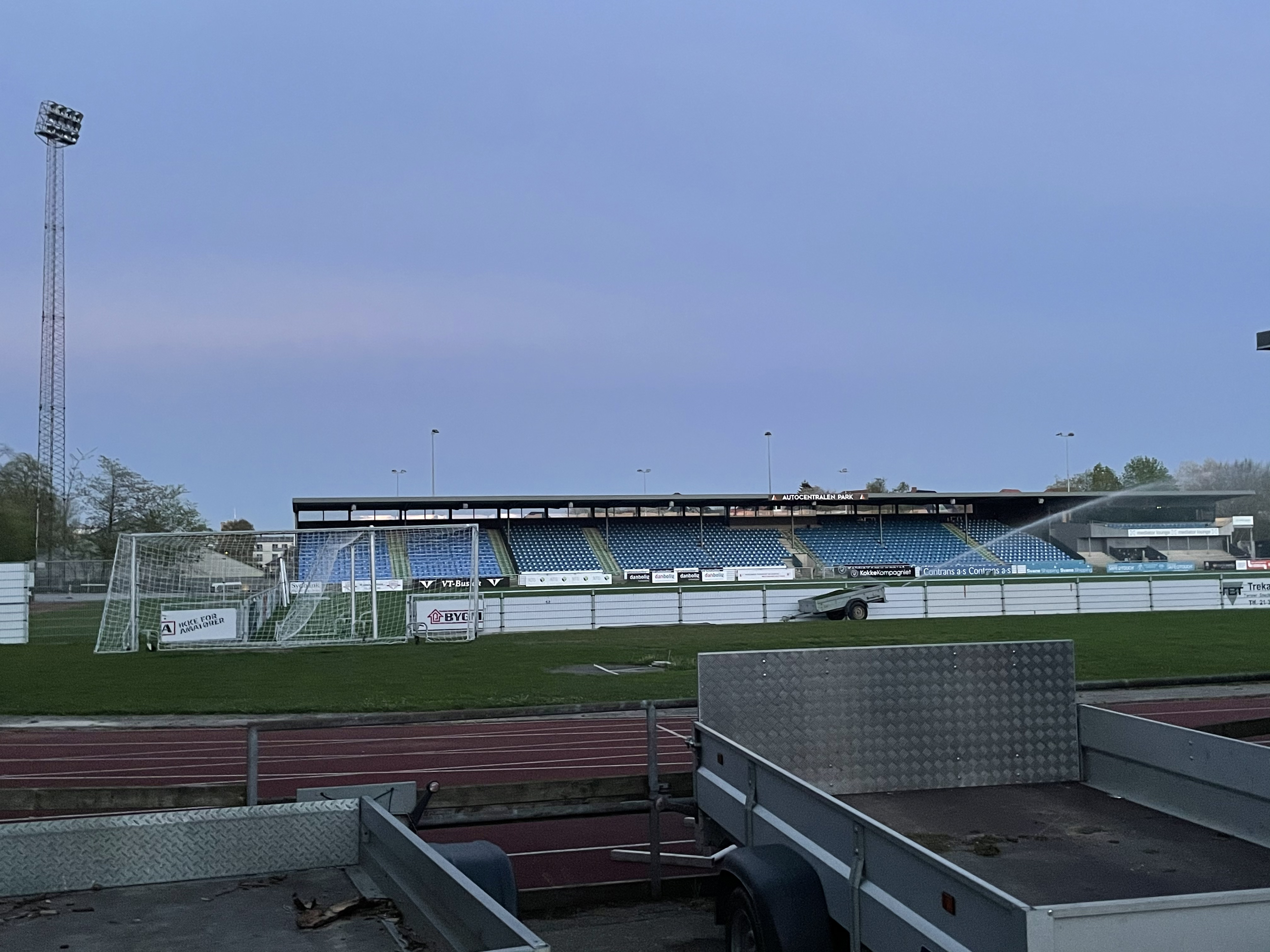

Kolding Stadion, known as Autocentral Park for sponsorship purposes, is a multi-purpose stadium in Kolding, Denmark.

It consists of an old wooden stand (west), a 700-seater, a larger more modern east stand, with room for a sitting crowd of 1,517 (after the 2006 rebuild), plus a round southern stand. There are four athletics running lanes (six for sprint distances up to 110 metres), and facilities for pole vaulting, high jumping, hammer throwing, shot putting and long jumping.

== History ==
In 1898, Kolding Fodsports Klub (literally: Kolding Footsports' Club, later Kolding IF) left Staldgården, near Koldinghus because of a new arena being built there. In 1913 they took over the area Olympia in Kolding and the pitch there. The poor conditions of the playing field, though, made the city council of Kolding finance a new stadium there, which was opened in 1931.

In 1972 the old building and main stand was demolished, to make room for a new one.

The American singer Whitney Houston performed a concert at the stadium on 15 August 1993, during The Bodyguard World Tour.

The ground has been used for three matches for the Denmark women's national football team, and several matches for various Danish national youth teams, latest matches for the Danish under-17 men's side and the women's under-19 team in 2007.

More recently, on 6 July 2007, the ground was used for a Bryan Adams concert.

=== 2006 rebuild ===
A slight rebuild was made in 2006, in order to make a new VIP-section on the east stand. The section has room for 140 dining guests, and a separate seating section with 40 seats. A direct entrance to the stadium from the cafeteria was also built, and the entrances (in the southwest corner and to the north) were renovated to Superliga-standards.

== External links and references ==
- (in Danish) Kolding Stadion from stadions.dk
- (in Danish) Photos, also from stadions.dk
- (in Danish) Further photos of the stadium from Kolding FC's fanclub-homepage
- (in Danish) Kolding Idræts Forening in the Kolding Leksikon at Kolding Municipality's homepage
