= Vejle Stadium =

Danish sports stadium

Coordinates: 55°42′50″N 9°33′26″E

Vejle Stadion
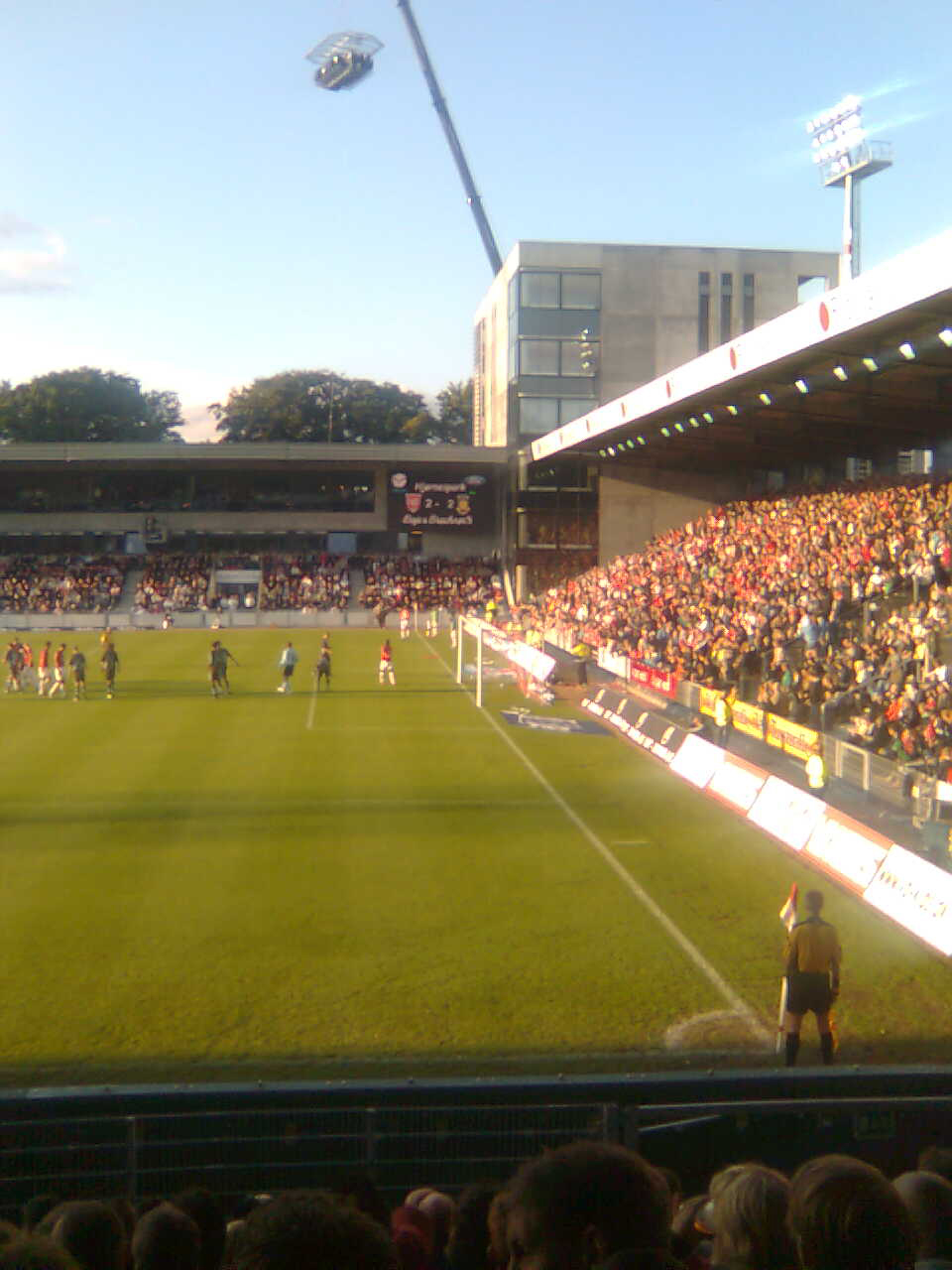
- Interactive map of Vejle Stadion
- Location: Roms Hule 3; 7100 Vejle
- Capacity: 11,060 (7,567 is covered and seated)
- Surface: Grass
- Field size: 108 m × 68 m (354 ft × 223 ft)

Construction
- Opened: 9 March 2008
- Cost: DKr. 75,000,000
- Architect: Årstiderne Arkitekter A/S

Tenant
- Vejle Boldklub

Vejle Stadium (Danish: Vejle Stadion) is a fully enclosed, modern (built in 2008) football stadium in Vejle, Denmark, and is home ground of Vejle Boldklub. The stadium has two towers for business and two VIP lounges. The stadium holds 11,060 spectators and the field is equipped with sprinkler and undersoil heating systems.

In 1995, a stand in the old Vejle Stadium collapsed when visiting fans celebrated an early goal by Brøndby IF against Vejle. About 30 people were injured.
