= Ann Jansson (footballer) =

Swedish association football player (born 1957)

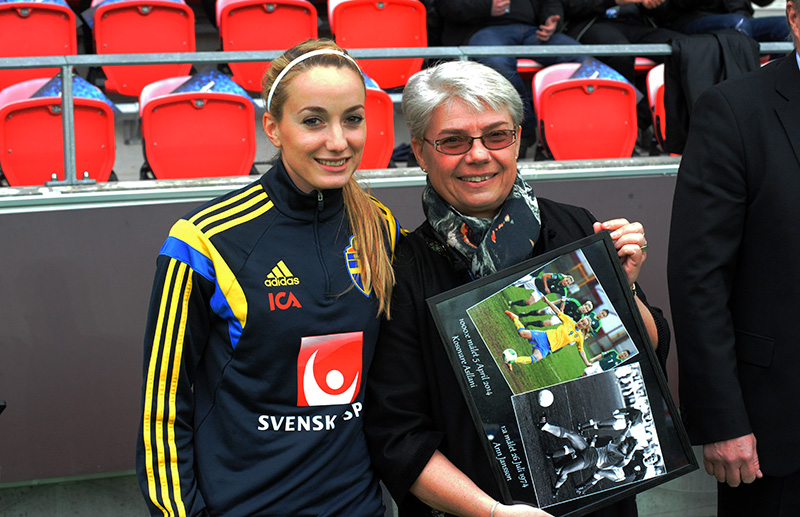
- Jansson (right) with Kosovare Asllani in 2014

Personal information
- Date of birth: 6 May 1957 (age 69)
- Place of birth: Stockholm, Sweden
- Positions: Forward; defender

Youth career
- Karlbergs BK
- 1970: Stockholms Godtemplare
- 1971: Älvsjö AIK

Senior career*
Years	Team	Apps	(Gls)
1972–1984	Hammarby IF	90	(72)

International career^{‡}
1973–1984	Sweden	37	(12)

Managerial career
- 1990: Hammarby IF
- * Club domestic league appearances and goals as of 12:51, 27 October 2018 (UTC) ‡ National team caps and goals as of 12:51, 27 October 2018 (UTC)

Ann Jansson (born 6 May 1957) is a Swedish former association footballer, who scored the Sweden women's national football team's first ever goal in 1974. In an 11-year national team career, she won 37 caps for Sweden, scoring 12 goals.

== Club career ==
Jansson scored 864 goals in 642 appearances for Hammarby IF between 1972 and 1984. With the club she played in six finals between 1974 and 1984, but lost them all. Hammarby won the national league title for the first time in 1985, the year after Jansson's retirement. In December 2017 she was inducted into the Swedish football Hall of Fame. She served as Hammarby's coach during the first half of the 1990 Damallsvenskan season. She scored 72 goals in 90 matches of Swedish's championship.

== International career ==
Jansson made her senior Sweden debut in a 0–0 draw with Finland in Mariehamn on 25 August 1973, the national team's first ever match. In Sweden's next match on 26 July 1974, also against Finland in Mariehamn, second-half substitute Jansson became the national team's first ever goal-scorer in a 1–0 win. In June 1975, Jansson scored twice to hand England their first ever defeat; 2–0 at Ullevi. As a free-scoring forward she scored four goals in her five appearances in 1975.

With Sweden Jansson won the first UEFA championships for national women's teams in 1984. Returning from a year-long injury absence for the semi-final win over Italy, versatile Jansson was deployed as a full-back. Sweden beat England in the final, on a penalty shootout at Kenilworth Road, Luton, after a 1–1 aggregate draw. Jansson successfully converted her kick in the shootout.

Jansson retired from football in 1984. When Kosovare Asllani scored the national team's 1,000th goal about 40 years after Jansson's first, the occasion was marked at a joint presentation before a match against Northern Ireland in Växjö.

== Personal life ==
During her football career Jansson was a gym teacher. She later became a head teacher.
