= Kari Nielsen =

Norwegian football player (born 1959)

Personal information
- Date of birth: 26 May 1959 (age 67)
- Place of birth: Sør-Odal, Norway
- Position: Forward

Senior career*
Years	Team	Apps	(Gls)
1978-1987	Asker		

International career
1978-1987	Norway	49	(14)

Managerial career
- 1994-1996: Asker
Medal record
Women's football
Representing Norway
UEFA Women's Championship
Gold medal – first place	Norway 1987	Team
- * Club domestic league appearances and goals

Kari Nielsen (born 26 May 1959) is a former Norwegian footballer, known as the first goal scorer for the Norway women's national football team.

Nielsen was also part of the Norwegian team at the 1987 European Championships. Kari Nielsen scored 14 goals in 49 appearances for Norway.

From 1994 through 1996 she managed Asker. After that she worked on an offshore oil rig.

Openly lesbian, she headed a Norwegian football team at the 2002 Gay Games as player-coach.

== Honours ==
Norway

- UEFA Women's Championship: 1987
