= Finland women's national football team =

Women's national association football team representing Finland

Finland
- Nickname: Helmarit (the Boreal Owls)
- Association: Football Association of Finland (Suomen Palloliitto)
- Confederation: UEFA (Europe)
- Head coach: Marko Saloranta
- Captain: Eva Nyström
- Most caps: Linda Sällström (157)
- Top scorer: Linda Sällström (64)
- FIFA code: FIN
First colours	Second colours

FIFA ranking
- Current: 22 ▲2 (20 October 2026)
- Highest: 14 (September 2005)
- Lowest: 32 (March 2019)

First international
- Finland 0–0 Sweden (Mariehamn, Finland; 25 August 1973)

Biggest win
- Bulgaria 0–8 Finland (Lovech, Bulgaria; 21 August 2014); Finland 8–0 Hungary (Larnaca, Cyprus; 19 February 2023)

Biggest defeat
- Denmark 9–0 Finland (Vejen, Denmark; 26 July 1975)

European Championship
- Appearances: 5 (first in 2005)
- Best result: Semi-finals (2005)

The Finland women's national football team (Finnish: Suomen naisten jalkapallomaajoukkue, Swedish: Finlands damlandslag i fotboll), also known as nickname The Boreal Owls (Finnish: Helmarit), represents Finland in international women's football. The team, controlled by the Football Association of Finland (SPL/FBF), reached the semi-finals of the 2005 European Championship, surprising the female football world having drawn with Sweden and beaten Denmark before losing to Germany in the semifinals. Finland hosted the 2009 European Championship.

The Finnish team has had a few players that are considered to be among the best in women's football, such as Laura Österberg Kalmari, Sanna Valkonen and Anne Mäkinen.

As of April 2026, the team is ranked 26th in the FIFA world ranking.

== History ==
=== The beginning ===
The Finland women's national football team played its first international match in 1973 against Sweden. The game was played in Mariehamn, Åland. The national team's greatest achievement is reaching the semi finals in Euro 2005.

== Team image ==
=== Nicknames ===
The Finland women's national football team has been known or nicknamed as the "Helmarit (the Boreal Owls)".

== Results and fixtures ==
The following is a list of match results in the last 12 months, as well as any future matches that have been scheduled.

Legend

Win Draw Loss Fixture

=== 2025 ===
27 November Friendly	Finland	1–1	Austria	Arcos de la Frontera, Spain
19:00				Stadium: Estadio Antonio Gallardo

1 December Friendly	Finland	1–1	Belgium	Sanlúcar de Barrameda, Spain
19:00	Sevenius 34'		Janssens 12'	Stadium: Estadio El Pamar

=== 2026 ===
3 March 2027 FIFA Women's World Cup qualification	Portugal	2–0	Finland	Pacos de Ferreira
18:45 (17:45 UTC)	Alves 90+1'; Santiago 90+4'	Report (FIFA); Report (UEFA)		Stadium: Estádio Capital do Móvel; Referee: Franziska Wildfeuer (Germany)

7 March 2027 FIFA Women's World Cup qualification	Finland	3–1	Latvia	Helsinki
13:30 (14:30 UTC+2)	Öling 26', 56'; Sevenius 65'	Report (FIFA); Report (UEFA)	Andersone 90+3'	Stadium: Helsinki Football Stadium; Attendance: 2,471; Referee: Tatyana Sorokopudova (Kazakhstan)

14 April 2027 FIFA Women's World Cup qualification	Finland	4–2	Slovakia	Helsinki
17:30 (18:30 UTC+3)	Kosola 4'; Engman 22'; P. Nyström 67'; E. Nyström 75'	Report (FIFA); Report (UEFA)	Fabová 35'; Hmírová 71' (pen.)	Stadium: Helsinki Football Stadium; Attendance: 4,287; Referee: Kirsty Dowle (England)

18 April 2027 FIFA Women's World Cup qualification	Latvia	0–1	Finland	Riga, Latvia
19:00 (20:00 UTC+3)		Report (FIFA); Report (UEFA)	Lindström 66'	Stadium: Daugava Stadium; Attendance: 3,554; Referee: Lovisa Johansson (Sweden)

5 June 2027 FIFA Women's World Cup qualification	Slovakia	0–4	Finland	Nitra
				Stadium: Štadión pod Zoborom

9 June 2027 FIFA Women's World Cup qualification	Finland	3–1	Portugal	Tampere
				Stadium: Tammelan Stadion

9 October 2027 FIFA Women's World Cup qualification	Finland	3-1	Serbia	Tampere
	Koivisto 28'; Lindström 36'; Franssi 88'	Report	Milivojević 82'	Stadium: Tammelan Stadion

13 October 2027 FIFA Women's World Cup qualification	Serbia	1-3	Finland	Stara Pazova
				Stadium: Serbian FA Sports Center

1 December 2027 FIFA Women's World Cup qualification	Finland	v	Italy

5 December 2027 FIFA Women's World Cup qualification	Italy	v	Finland

== Coaching staff ==
=== Current coaching staff ===
As of October 2024

- Head coach: Marko Saloranta
- Assistant coaches: Jari Väisänen, Liisa-Maija Rautio
- Goalkeeping coach: Tommy Nordenswan
- Fitness coach: Eero Savolainen
- Psychological coach: Vacant
- Doctor: Pippa Laukka
- Physiotherapists: Markus Rosenblad, Sannakaisa Vastamäki
- Kit managers: Piia Karonen, Alban Saliko
- Video Analyst: Jouko Kylmäoja
- Team managers: Outi Saarinen, Sanna Pirhonen
- Press officers: Eveliina Parikka, Jyri Sulander
- Media officer: Taru Nyholm

=== Manager history ===
As of 2 December 2025

Tenure	Coach	Record				
Tenure	Coach	G	W	D	L	Win %
1973–77	(Finland) Juhani Nirkkonen	12	1	1	10	8.33
1978	(Finland) Simo Syrjävaara	3	1	1	1	33.33
1979–89	(Finland) Kaj Österberg	44	13	12	19	29.55
1989–92	(Finland) Jyrki Nieminen	24	3	4	17	12.50
1993–96	(Finland) Nils Suomalainen	24	4	5	15	16.67
1996–00	(Finland) Reima Kokko	46	11	3	32	23.91
2001–09	(Finland) Michael Käld	107	35	22	50	32.71
2010–16	(Sweden) Andrée Jeglertz	76	27	13	36	35.53
2017	(Finland) Marko Saloranta	6	2	0	4	33.33
2017–2022	(Sweden) Anna Signeul	47	19	11	17	40.43
2022–	(Finland) Marko Saloranta	43	21	11	11	48.84

== Players ==
=== Current squad ===
The following players were called up for the 2027 FIFA Women's World Cup qualification matches against Slovakia and Portugal on 5 and 9 June 2026, respectively.

Caps and goals correct as of 9 June 2026, after the match against Portugal.

No.	Pos.	Player	Date of birth (age)	Caps	Goals	Club
1	GK	Anna Koivunen	28 November 1999 (age 26)	14	0	(The Football Association) Charlton Athletic
12	GK	Anna Tamminen	30 October 1994 (age 32)	16	0	(The Football Association) Newcastle United
23	GK	Katriina Talaslahti	21 September 2000 (age 26)	6	0	(French Football Federation) Dijon
2	DF	Jasmin Mansaray	27 December 2004 (age 21)	1	0	(Norwegian Football Federation) LSK Kvinner
3	DF	Eva Nyström (captain)	29 November 1999 (age 26)	42	4	(The Football Association) West Ham United
5	DF	Emma Koivisto	25 September 1994 (age 32)	121	8	(Italian Football Federation) AC Milan
6	DF	Joanna Tynnilä	1 September 2001 (age 25)	29	0	(Norwegian Football Federation) Brann
10	DF	Emmi Siren	23 February 2001 (age 25)	12	0	(French Football Federation) Dijon
14	DF	Julia Tunturi	25 April 1996 (age 30)	30	0	(Swedish Football Association) Vittsjö
16	DF	Nea Lehtola	24 October 1998 (age 28)	26	5	(Norwegian Football Federation) Brann
22	DF	Helmi Raijas	11 May 2005 (age 21)	5	0	(Swedish Football Association) Växjö
4	MF	Ria Öling	15 September 1994 (age 32)	104	134	(Swedish Football Association) Rosengård
7	MF	Adelina Engman	11 October 1994 (age 32)	103	13	(Swedish Football Association) IF Brommapojkarna
8	MF	Olga Ahtinen	15 August 1997 (age 29)	82	4	(The Football Association) Tottenham Hotspur
9	MF	Katariina Kosola	24 February 2001 (age 25)	34	5	(Swedish Football Association) Malmö FF
9	MF	Aada Nurmi	12 March 2003 (age 23)	1	0	(Football Association of Finland) KuPS
11	MF	Vilma Koivisto	21 November 2002 (age 24)	18	1	(Swedish Football Association) Hammarby
13	MF	Oona Siren	23 February 2001 (age 25)	34	1	(The Football Association) West Ham United
15	MF	Emma Peuhkurinen	30 November 1999 (age 26)	12	0	(Norwegian Football Federation) Brann
20	MF	Eveliina Summanen	29 May 1998 (age 28)	85	14	(The Football Association) Tottenham Hotspur
17	FW	Sanni Franssi	19 March 1995 (age 31)	101	7	(The Football Association) London City Lionesses
18	FW	Paulina Nyström	17 August 2000 (age 26)	6	1	(Swedish Football Association) Häcken
19	FW	Lotta Lindström	10 September 2004 (age 22)	14	4	(The Football Association) Bristol City
21	FW	Oona Sevenius	28 April 2004 (age 22)	38	9	(The Football Association) Newcastle United

=== Recent call-ups ===
The following players have also been called up to the squad within the past 12 months.

Pos.	Player	Date of birth (age)	Caps	Goals	Club	Latest call-up
GK	Milla-Maj Majasaari	15 October 1999 (age 27)	2	0	(Denmark) Fortuna Hjørring	v. Belgium, 1 December 2025
DF	Maaria Roth ^{PRE}	13 June 1997 (age 29)	9	0	(Finland) HJK	v. Slovakia, 14 April 2026
DF	Nanne Ruuskanen	19 November 2001 (age 25)	2	0	(Sweden) Djurgården	v. Belgium, 1 December 2025
MF	Milja Kiviranta	15 May 2006 (age 20)	5	0	(Finland) HJK	v. Latvia, 7 March 2026
FW	Dana Leskinen	22 September 2001 (age 25)	3	0	(Italy) Parma	v. Belgium, 1 December 2025
FW	Linda Sällström ^{RET}	13 July 1988 (age 38)	157	64	Retired	v. Denmark, 28 October 2025
FW	Jutta Rantala	11 November 1999 (age 27)	36	10	(England) Leicester City	v. Denmark, 28 October 2025
Notes: ^{ALT} = Alternate; ^{INJ} = Withdrew due to injury; ^{PRE} = Preliminary squad / standby; ^{RET} = Retired from the national team

== Records ==
As of 9 June 2026

Players in bold are still active with the national team.

=== Most appearances ===
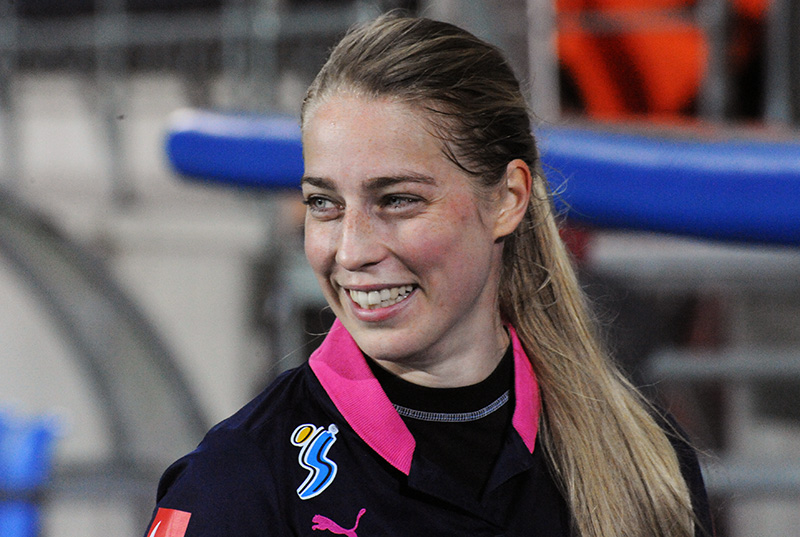
Linda Sällström currently holds the records for both the most appearances and the most goals for the Finland women's national football team.

Rank	Player	Career	Caps	Goals
1	Linda Sällström	2007–2025	157	64
2	Anna Westerlund	2008–2022	147	4
3	Laura Österberg Kalmari	1996–2011	130	41
4	Tinja-Riikka Korpela	2007–2025	128	0
5	**Emma Koivisto**	2012–present	121	8
5	Tuija Hyyrynen	2007–2022	121	3
7	Sanna Valkonen	1995–2009	120	7
8	Anne Mäkinen	1991–2009	118	16
8	Jessica Julin	1997–2009	118	4
10	Emmi Alanen	2010–2025	109	22

=== Top goalscorers ===
Rank	Player	Career	Goals	Caps	Avg.
1	Linda Sällström	2007–2025	64	157	0.41
2	Laura Österberg Kalmari	1996–2011	41	130	0.32
3	Sanna Talonen	2004–2014	36	103	0.35
4	Emmi Alanen	2010–2025	22	109	0.20
5	Annica Sjölund	2006–2014	17	69	0.25
6	Anne Mäkinen	1991–2009	16	118	0.14
7	**Eveliina Summanen**	2017–present	14	85	0.16
7	**Ria Öling**	2015–present	14	104	0.13
9	**Adelina Engman**	2012–present	13	103	0.13
10	Heidi Kackur	1999–2005	12	48	0.25

== Competitive record ==
=== FIFA Women's World Cup ===
FIFA Women's World Cup record									Qualification record							
Year	Result	GP	W	D*	L	GF	GA	GD	Round	GP	W	D*	L	GF	GA	GD
(China) 1991	Did not qualify								UEFA Euro 1991							
(Sweden) 1995	Did not qualify								UEFA Euro 1995							
(United States) 1999	Lost in Play-offs to Russia								Play-offs	8	3	1	4	8	9	−1
(United States) 2003	Did not qualify								Group 2	6	1	0	5	4	24	−20
(China) 2007	Did not qualify								Group 3	8	5	1	2	16	5	+11
(Germany) 2011	Did not qualify								Group 7	8	6	1	1	25	6	+19
(Canada) 2015	Did not qualify								Group 7	10	7	0	3	27	9	+18
(France) 2019	Did not qualify								Group 7	8	3	1	4	9	13	−4
(Australia) (New Zealand) 2023	Did not qualify								Group A	8	3	1	4	14	12	−10
(Brazil) 2027	To be determined								Play-offs							
(Costa Rica) (Jamaica) (Mexico) (United States) 2031	To be determined								To be determined							
(United Kingdom) 2035	To be determined								To be determined							
Total	-	-	-	-	-	-	-	-	Round	56	28	5	23	103	78	+13

*Draws include knockout matches decided on penalty kicks.

=== Olympic Games ===
Summer Olympics record
Year	Result	GP	W	D	L	GF	GA
(United States) 1996	Did not qualify						
(Australia) 2000	Did not qualify						
(Greece) 2004	Did not qualify						
(China) 2008	Did not qualify						
(United Kingdom) 2012	Did not qualify						
(Brazil) 2016	Did not qualify						
(Japan) 2020	Did not qualify						
(France) 2024	Unable to qualify (Note: Finland was unable to qualify since Finland was in the “League B” at the 2023–24 UEFA Women's Nations League.)						
(United States) 2028	To be determined						
(Australia) 2032	To be determined						
Total	-	-	-	-	-	-	-

=== UEFA Women's Championship ===
UEFA Women's Championship record									Qualifying record									
Year	Result	P	W	D*	L	GF	GA	GD	Round	P	W	D*	L	GF	GA	GD	P/R	Rnk
1984	Did not qualify								Group 1	6	2	0	4	5	17	−12	–	
(Norway) 1987	Did not qualify								Group 1	6	1	2	3	2	6	−4	–	
(West Germany) 1989	Did not qualify								Group 1	6	1	2	3	9	11	−2	–	
(Denmark) 1991	Did not qualify								Group 3	6	1	2	3	3	6	−3	–	
(Italy) 1993	Did not qualify								Group 2	4	0	2	2	3	12	−9	–	
(Germany) 1995	Did not qualify								Group 1	6	2	3	1	8	7	+1	–	
(Norway) (Sweden) 1997	Did not qualify								Play-offs	8	1	1	6	2	24	−22	–	
(Germany) 2001	Did not qualify								Play-offs	8	2	0	6	8	21	−13	–	
(England) 2005	Semi-finals	4	1	1	2	5	8	−3	Play-offs	10	4	4	2	16	7	+9	–	
(Finland) 2009	Quarter-finals	4	2	0	2	5	5	0	Qualified as host									
(Sweden) 2013	Group stage	3	0	2	1	1	6	−5	Group 5	8	6	1	1	22	4	+18	–	
(Netherlands) 2017	Did not qualify								Group 2	8	4	1	3	17	12	+5	–	
(England) 2022	Group stage	3	0	0	3	1	8	−7	Group E	8	7	1	0	24	2	+22	–	
(Switzerland) 2025	Group stage	3	1	1	1	3	3	0	Play-offs	10	4	3	3	12	12	0	▼ (Note: From Euro 2025 onwards a new qualifying format was introduced, linked to the Women's Nations League where teams are divided into leagues with promotion/relegation between the leagues at the end of each cycle.)	13th
(Germany) 2029	To be determined								To be determined									
Total	5/14	17	4	4	9	15	30	−15	Total	94	35	22	37	131	141	−10	13th	

*Draws include knockout matches decided on penalty kicks.

=== UEFA Women's Nations League ===
UEFA Women's Nations League record
Season	Division	Group	Pos	Pld	W	D	L	GF	GA	P/R	Rnk
2023–24	B	2	1st	6	5	1	0	18	2	▲	18th
2025	B	3	2nd	8	3	2	3	9	10	*	23rd
2026	B	3	2nd	6	5	0	1	15	6	*	21st
Total				14	8	1	3	27	12	18th and 23rd	

▲	Promoted at end of season
Same position	No movement at end of season
▼	Relegated at end of season
*	Participated in promotion/relegation play-offs

=== Pinatar Cup ===
Pinatar Cup record
Year	Result	GP	W	D	L	GF	GA	GD
2024	Champions	2	1	1	0	2	1	+1
Total		2	1	1	0	2	1	+1

=== Cyprus Women's Cup ===
Cyprus Women's Cup record
Year	Result	GP	W	D	L	GF	GA	GD
2012	7th place	4	1	1	2	6	7	−1
2013	7th place	4	1	1	2	5	6	−1
2014	12th place	4	0	1	3	1	8	−7
2015	9th place	4	1	1	2	3	7	−4
2016	8th place	4	0	1	3	3	8	−5
2018	11th place	4	1	1	2	4	7	−3
2019	9th place	4	1	1	2	3	6	−3
2020	Runners-up	3	1	1	1	7	6	+1
2023	Champions	3	3	0	0	16	1	+15
Total		34	9	8	17	48	56	−8

=== Algarve Cup ===
Algarve Cup record
Year	Result	GP	W	D	L	GF	GA	GD
1994	6th place	3	0	0	3	0	9	−9
1995	6th place	4	1	0	3	3	6	−3
1996	8th place	4	0	0	4	1	15	−14
1997	6th place	4	1	0	3	3	8	−5
1998	8th place	4	0	0	4	2	6	−4
1999	8th place	4	0	1	3	1	7	−6
2000	7th place	4	1	0	3	5	8	−3
2001	7th place	4	1	0	3	4	15	−11
2002	7th place	4	1	0	3	4	8	−5
2003	6th place	4	0	2	2	0	6	−6
2004	9th place	4	1	0	3	6	10	−4
2005	10th place	4	0	0	4	3	10	−7
2006	7th place	4	1	1	2	5	12	−7
2007	6th place	4	1	0	3	2	6	−4
2008	8th place	4	0	0	4	1	10	−9
2009	7th place	4	1	0	3	1	5	−4
2010	8th place	4	0	1	3	2	11	−9
2011	10th place	4	0	0	4	2	13	−11
Total								

=== Nordic Football Championship ===
Women's Nordic Football Championship record
Year	Result	GP	W	D	L	GF	GA	GD
(Finland) 1974	Third place	2	0	0	2	0	6	−6
(Denmark) 1975	Third place	2	0	0	2	0	13	−13
(Sweden) 1976	Third place	2	0	0	2	1	5	−4
(Finland) 1977	Third place	2	0	0	2	0	5	−5
(Denmark) 1978	Third place	3	1	1	1	1	4	−3
(Norway) 1979	Third place	3	1	1	1	2	5	−3
(Sweden) 1980	Fourth place	3	0	2	1	1	8	−7
(Finland) 1981	Runners-up	3	1	1	1	3	4	−1
(Denmark) 1982	Fourth place	3	0	1	2	1	6	−5
Total	9/9	23	3	6	14	9	56	−47

== See also ==
- Sports in Finland
- Football in Finland
- Football Association of Finland (SPL)
- Finland women's national under-20 football team
- Finland women's national under-17 football team
- Finland national football team
