= Eva Andersson (footballer) =

Swedish footballer (born 1963)

Personal information
- Date of birth: 17 August 1963 (age 63)
- Place of birth: Sundsvall, Sweden

International career
| Years | Team | Apps | (Gls) |
| 1983-1986 | Sweden | 36 | (7) |

Eva "Lill-Eva" Andersson (born August 15, 1963) is a former Swedish footballer. Andersson has played for Kubikenborgs IF, GIF Sundsvall, Sundsvalls DFF and Öxabäcks IF. Andersson was a member of the Swedish national team that won the 1984 European Competition for Women's Football.
