= Karin Ödlund =

Swedish footballer (1959–2005)

Personal information
- Full name: Karin Margareta Sofia Ödlund
- Date of birth: 22 February 1959
- Place of birth: Alnö, Sweden
- Date of death: 1 April 2005 (aged 46)
- Place of death: Alnön, Sweden
- Position: Striker

International career
Years	Team	Apps	(Gls)
1983-1986	Sweden	31	(13)

Karin Margareta Sofia Ödlund (22 February 1959 – 1 April 2005) was a Swedish footballer. Ödlund was a member of the Swedish national team that won the 1984 European Competition for Women's Football. In November 2007 she was named among 11 nominees for the Medelpads Fotbollförbund's best ever player.
