= Birgitta Söderström =

Swedish international footballer

Personal information
- Date of birth: 12 July 1956 (age 70)
- Place of birth: Stockholm, Sweden

International career
Years	Team	Apps	(Gls)
1973-1986	Sweden	36	(15)

Birgitta Söderström (born 12 July 1956) is a former Swedish footballer and bandy player.

== International career ==
Söderström was a member of the very first Sweden women's national football team, which played against Finland on 25 August 1973.
