= 1984 European Competition for Women's Football =

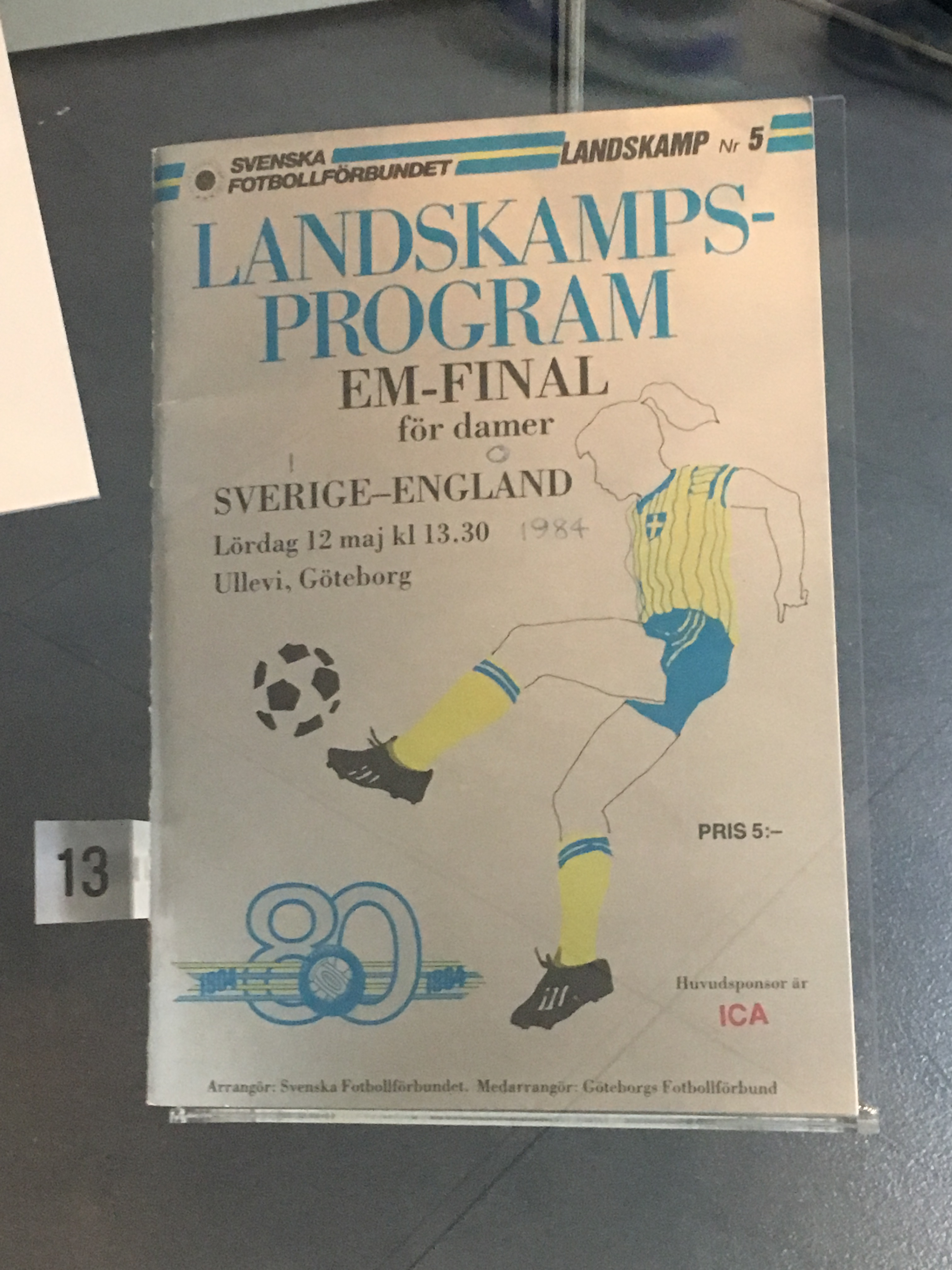
- Programme from the final, first leg

Tournament details
- Dates: 8 April – 27 May
- Teams: 4
- Venues: 6 (in 6 host cities)

Final positions
- Champions: Sweden (1st title)
- Runners-up: England

Tournament statistics
- Matches played: 6
- Goals scored: 14 (2.33 per match)
- Attendance: 20,830 (3,472 per match)
- Top scorer: (Sweden) Pia Sundhage (4 goals)
- Best player: (Sweden) Pia Sundhage

The 1984 European Competition for Women's Football was won by Sweden on penalties against England. It comprised four qualifying groups, the winner of each going through to the semi-finals which were played over two legs, home and away. As only sixteen teams took part (less than half the membership of UEFA at the time), the competition could not be granted official status. Matches comprised two halves of 35 minutes, played with a size-four football.

== Squads ==
For a list of all squads that played in the final tournament, see 1984 European Competition for Women's Football squads

== Bracket ==
Semi-finals
Italy	2	1	3
Sweden	3	2	5
England	2	1	3
Denmark	1	0	1

Final
Sweden (p)	1	0	1 (4)
England	0	1	1 (3)

== Semifinals ==
=== First leg ===
8 April 1984
14:30

England	2–1	Denmark
Davis 31'; Deighan 51'	DBU Report (in Danish); Report	Hindkjær 49' (pen.)

Gresty Road, Crewe
Attendance: 1,000
Referee: Kevin O'Sullivan (Republic of Ireland)
8 April 1984
12:00

Italy	2–3	Sweden
Morace 18'; Vignotto 31'	SvFF Report (in Swedish); FIGC Report (in Italian); Report	Björk 23'; Sundhage 48'; Uusitalo 57' (Note: Other sources credit an Italy own goal along with Sundhage and Börjesson goals.)

Stadio Flaminio, Rome
Attendance: 5,000
Referee: Werner Föckler (West Germany)
*Match info

=== Second leg ===
28 April 1984
14:00

Denmark	0–1	England
	DBU Report (in Danish); Report	Bampton 44'

Hjørring Stadium, Hjørring
Attendance: 1,439
Referee: Kaj Natri (Finland)

England won 3–1 on aggregate.

28 April 1984

Sweden	2–1	Italy
Sundhage 28', 52' (Note: Other sources credit Doris Uusitalo with the first goal.)	SvFF Report (in Swedish); FIGC Report (in Italian); Report	Morace 50'

Folkungavallen, Linköping
Attendance: 5,162
Referee: Rolf Haugen (Norway)
*Match info

Sweden won 5–3 on aggregate.

== Final ==
=== First leg ===
12 May 1984

Sweden	1–0	England
Sundhage 57'	SvFF Report (in Swedish); Report

Ullevi, Gothenburg
Attendance: 5,662
Referee: Cees Bakker (Netherlands)
*Match info

=== Second leg ===
27 May 1984

England	1–0	Sweden
Curl 31'	SvFF Report (in Swedish); Report
Penalties
Curl (penalty missed); Gallimore (penalty scored); Bampton (penalty scored); Hanson (penalty missed); Davis (penalty scored)	3–4	(penalty scored) Börjesson; (penalty scored) Andersson; (penalty missed) Björk; (penalty scored) Jansson; (penalty scored) Sundhage

Kenilworth Road, Luton
Attendance: 2,567
Referee: Ignace Goris (Belgium)

1–1 on aggregate. No extra time played. Sweden won 4–3 on penalties.

== Goalscorers ==
4 goals

- (Sweden) Pia Sundhage

2 goals

- (England) Linda Curl
- (Italy) Carolina Morace

1 goal

- (Denmark) Inge Hindkjær
- (England) Debbie Bampton
- (England) Kerry Davis
- (Italy) Elisabetta Vignotto
- (Sweden) Helen Johansson Björk
- (Sweden) Doris Uusitalo

Source: UEFA
