= Inge Hindkjær =

Danish footballer (born 1958)

Personal information
- Birth name: Inge Henriksen
- Date of birth: 16 November 1958 (age 67)
- Place of birth: Denmark
- Position: Forward

Senior career*
Years	Team	Apps	(Gls)
- Skovlunde IF

International career
1977–1984	Denmark	25	(11)
- * Club domestic league appearances and goals

Inge Hindkjær (née Henriksen; born 16 November 1958) is a Danish former international footballer who played as a forward for Skovlunde IF and the Danish national team.
