= 1984 European Competition for Women's Football squads =

This article lists all the confirmed national football squads for the 1984 European Competition for Women's Football.

Players marked (c) were named as captain for their national squad.

== Denmark ==
Head coach: (Denmark) Flemming Schultz

No.	Pos.	Player	Date of birth (age)	Caps	Goals	Club
1	GK	Gitte Hansen	21 September 1961 (aged 22)	9	0	(Danish Football Association) Boldklubben 1909
2	MF	Kirsten Fabrin	20 December 1953 (aged 30)	19	3	(Danish Football Association) Boldklubben 1909
3	DF	Glennie Nielsen		10	0	(Danish Football Association) Skovlunde IF
4	MF	Jette Andersen	8 June 1959 (aged 24)	9	1	(Danish Football Association) Fortuna Hjørring
5	DF	Jette Hansen	17 November 1953 (aged 30)	18	2	(Danish Football Association) Boldklubben Rødovre
6	MF	Hanne Pedersen (c)	4 July 1963 (aged 20)	7	0	(Danish Football Association) Boldklubben Rødovre
7	MF	Mette Munk Pedersen	24 January 1964 (aged 20)	1	0	(Danish Football Association) Fortuna Hjørring
8	MF	Susan Mackensie	24 December 1962 (aged 21)	4	0	(Danish Football Association) HEI Aarhus
9	FW	Lone Smidt Hansen	1 January 1961 (aged 23)	38	15	(Danish Football Association) Boldklubben 1909
10	DF	Birgitte Frederiksen	19 November 1963 (aged 20)	4	3	(Danish Football Association) Boldklubben 1909
11	FW	Inge Henriksen	16 November 1958 (aged 25)	22	10	(Danish Football Association) Skovlunde IF
12	FW	Annie Gam-Pedersen	5 July 1965 (aged 18)	12	1	(Danish Football Association) HEI Aarhus
13	DF	Lis Lene Nielsen	29 August 1951 (aged 32)	5	0	(Danish Football Association) Boldklubben 1909
14	DF	Charlotte Nielsen-Mann	22 February 1958 (aged 26)	22	3	(Danish Football Association) HEI Aarhus
15	MF	Pia Andersen	27 April 1960 (aged 23)	3	0	(Danish Football Association) Ringsted IF
16	GK	Marianne Riis	8 October 1953 (aged 30)	26	0	(Danish Football Association) HEI Aarhus
	DF	Annette Mogensen	26 May 1959 (aged 24)	21	5	(Danish Football Association) Kolding Boldklub
	MF	Hanne Larsen	7 December 1960 (aged 23)	18	2	(Danish Football Association) Boldklubben Rødovre
	MF	Helle Pedersen	8 December 1963 (aged 20)	1	0	(Danish Football Association) Skovlunde IF

== England ==
Head coach: (England) Martin Reagan

No.	Pos.	Player	Date of birth (age)	Caps	Goals	Club
1	GK	Theresa Wiseman	0 December 1956 (aged 27–28)	14		(The Football Association) Howbury Grange
2	DF	Carol Thomas (c)	5 June 1955 (aged 28)	41		(The Football Association) Rowntree
3	DF	Morag Pearce		36		(The Football Association) Southampton
4	DF	Lorraine Hanson		23		(The Football Association) Doncaster Belles
5	DF	Angela Gallimore		10		(The Football Association) Broadoak
6	MF	Gillian Coultard	22 July 1963 (aged 20)	12		(The Football Association) Rowntree
7	MF	Elisabeth Deighan		32		(The Football Association) St Helens
8	MF	Debbie Bampton	7 October 1961 (aged 22)	10		(The Football Association) Howbury Grange
9	FW	Linda Curl	0 December 1962 (aged 21–22)	28		(The Football Association) Norwich
10	FW	Kerry Davis	2 August 1962 (aged 21)	7		(The Football Association) Crewe
11	MF	Pat Chapman	21 July 1956 (aged 27)	25		(The Football Association) Southampton
12	GK	Theresa Irvine		6		(The Football Association) Aylesbury
13	MF	Brenda Sempare	9 November 1961 (aged 22)	2		(The Football Association) Friends of Fulham
14	MF	Hope Powell	8 December 1966 (aged 17)	2		(The Football Association) Millwall Lionesses
15	MF	Janet Turner		11		(The Football Association) Crewe
16	DF	Sheila Parker	0 December 1947 (aged 36–37)	30		(The Football Association) Chorley

== Italy ==
Head coach: (Italy) Enzo Benedetti

No.	Pos.	Player	Date of birth (age)	Caps	Goals	Club
1	GK	Eva Russo	20 December 1966 (aged 17)			(Italian Football Federation) Lazio
2	DF	Maura Furlotti	12 September 1957 (aged 26)			(Italian Football Federation) Lazio
3	MF	Adele Marsiletti	7 November 1964 (aged 19)			(Italian Football Federation) ACF Trani 80
4	MF	Maria Mariotti	27 January 1964 (aged 20)			(Italian Football Federation) ACF Trani 80
5	DF	Paola Bonato	31 January 1961 (aged 23)			(Italian Football Federation) ACF Trani 80
6	MF	Feriana Ferraguzzi	20 February 1959 (aged 25)			(Royal Belgian Football Association) Standard Liège
7	MF	Viviana Bontacchio	11 June 1959 (aged 24)			(Italian Football Federation) ACF Trani 80
8	FW	Carolina Morace	5 February 1964 (aged 20)			(Italian Football Federation) ACF Trani 80
9	FW	Elisabetta Vignotto (c)	13 January 1954 (aged 30)			(Italian Football Federation) Roma
10	MF	Elisabetta Secci	7 October 1962 (aged 21)			(Italian Football Federation) Roma
11	MF	Antonella Carta	1 March 1967 (aged 17)			(Italian Football Federation) Roma
12	GK	Giorgia Brenzan	21 August 1967 (aged 16)			(Italian Football Federation) Juve Piemonte
13	MF	Viola Langella	14 January 1961 (aged 23)			(Italian Football Federation) ACF Trani 80
14	FW	Ernesta Venuto				(Italian Football Federation) Roma
15	MF	Anna Mega	21 October 1962 (aged 21)			(Italian Football Federation) ACF Trani 80

== Sweden ==
Head coach: (Sweden) Ulf Lyfors

No.	Pos.	Player	Date of birth (age)	Caps	Goals	Club
1	GK	Elisabeth Leidinge	6 March 1957 (aged 27)	31	0	(Swedish Football Association) Jitex BK
2	DF	Anette Börjesson (c)	11 November 1954 (aged 29)	45	6	(Swedish Football Association) Jitex BK
3	MF	Ann Jansson	6 May 1957 (aged 26)	34	12	(Swedish Football Association) Hammarby IF
4	DF	Angelica Burevik	7 December 1958 (aged 25)	18	0	(Swedish Football Association) Stattena IF
5	MF	Mia Kåberg	9 June 1958 (aged 25)	8	0	(Swedish Football Association) AIK
6	DF	Karin Åhman-Svensson	30 March 1957 (aged 27)	29	2	(Swedish Football Association) Öxabäcks IF
7	MF	Anna Svenjeby	26 April 1962 (aged 21)	31	3	(Swedish Football Association) Jitex BK
8	MF	Eva Andersson	15 August 1963 (aged 20)	16	5	(Swedish Football Association) GIF Sundsvall
9	FW	Lena Videkull	9 December 1962 (aged 21)	0	0	(Swedish Football Association) Trollhättans IF
10	FW	Pia Sundhage	13 February 1960 (aged 24)	42	24	(Swedish Football Association) Jitex BK
11	FW	Helen Johansson	9 July 1965 (aged 18)	13	8	(Swedish Football Association) Jitex BK
12	GK	Inger Arnesson	12 April 1953 (aged 30)	11	0	(Swedish Football Association) Sunnanå SK
13	DF	Catarina Gjellan	1 October 1963 (aged 20)	2	0	(Swedish Football Association) Gideonsbergs IF
14	MF	Camilla Andersson	25 May 1962 (aged 21)	10	1	(Swedish Football Association) Sunnanå SK
15	MF	Gunilla Axén	27 October 1966 (aged 17)	0	0	(Swedish Football Association) Gideonsbergs IF
16	FW	Karin Ödlund	22 February 1959 (aged 25)	31	13	(Swedish Football Association) Alnö IF
	DF	Anette Hansson	2 May 1963 (aged 20)	0	0	(Swedish Football Association) Malmö FF
	DF	Anette Nicklasson	11 November 1955 (aged 28)	23	0	(Swedish Football Association) Jitex BK
	MF	Doris Uusitalo	17 October 1957 (aged 26)	7	0	(Swedish Football Association) Hammarby IF

Source: Swedish Football Association
