= 1984 European Competition for Women's Football final =

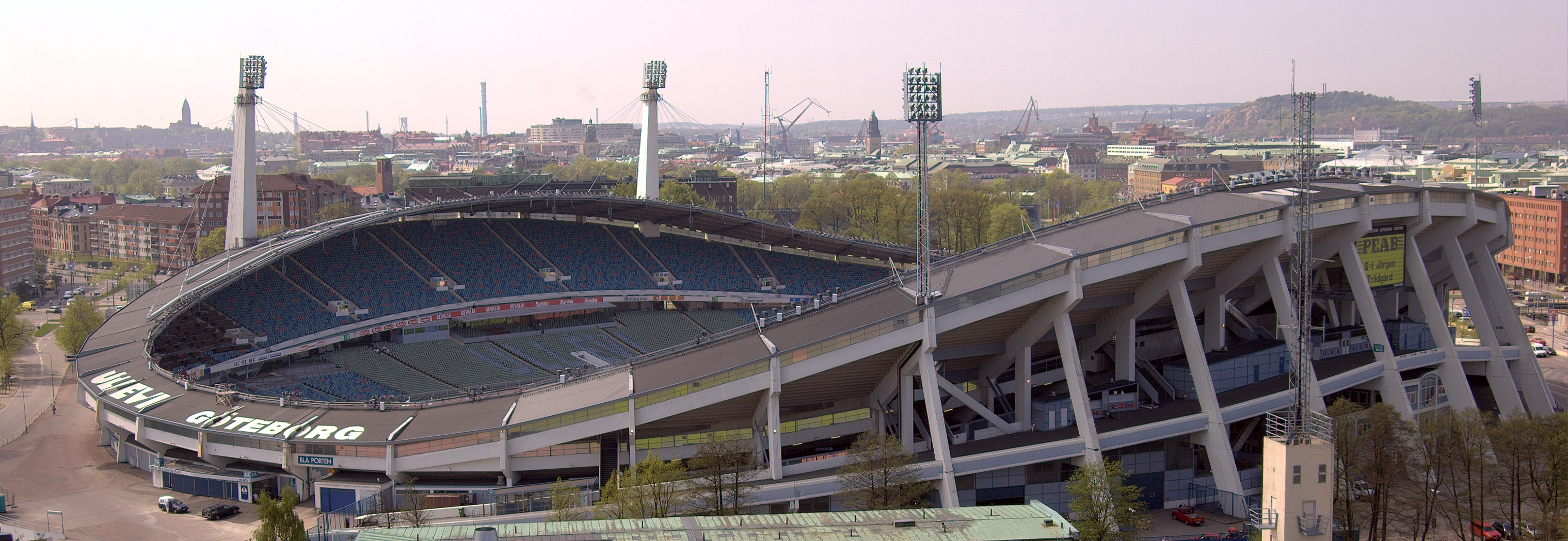
- Event: 1984 European Competition for Women's Football
Sweden	England
(Sweden)	(England)
1	1
- on aggregate Sweden won 4–3 on penalties

First leg
Sweden	England
1	0
- Date: 12 May 1984
- Venue: Ullevi, Gothenburg
- Referee: Cees Bakker (Netherlands)
- Attendance: 5,662

Second leg
England	Sweden
1	0
- Date: 27 May 1984
- Venue: Kenilworth Road, Luton
- Referee: Ignace Goris (Belgium)
- Attendance: 2,567

The 1984 European Competition for Women's Football final was a two-legged football tie to determine the winner of the 1984 European Competition for Women's Football. It was the first UEFA Women's Championship final, UEFA's top football competition for women's national teams. The match was contested by Sweden and England at Ullevi, Gothenburg, on 12 May 1984, and at Kenilworth Road, Luton, on 27 May 1984.

Watched by a crowd of 5,552 at Ullevi, dominant Sweden took the lead in the first leg when Pia Sundhage scored in the 57th minute. A crowd of 2,567 at Kenilworth Road watched England level the tie though Linda Curl's 31st minute goal in extremely wet and muddy conditions. Sweden then beat England 4–3 on penalties to secure the inaugural UEFA Women's Championship.

== Match details ==
=== First leg ===
12 May 1984
13:30 CEST

Sweden	1–0	England
Sundhage 57'	Report

Ullevi, Gothenburg
Attendance: 5,552
Referee: Cees Bakker (Netherlands)

Sweden	England

GK	1	Elisabeth Leidinge
RB	4	Angelica Burevik
CB	3	Anette Börjesson (c)
CB	5	Mia Kåberg
LB	2	Ann Jansson
RM	7	Eva Andersson
CM	6	Anna Svenjeby
LM	9	Karin Åhman-Svensson
RW	10	Lena Videkull
CF	11	Pia Sundhage
LW	8	Anette Hansson
Manager:
Ulf Lyfors

GK	1	Theresa Wiseman
RB	2	Carol Thomas (c)
CB	4	Lorraine Hanson
CB	5	Angela Gallimore
LB	3	Maggie Pearce
RM	6	Gillian Coultard
CM	7	Liz Deighan
LM	8	Debbie Bampton
RW	9	Linda Curl
CF	10	Kerry Davis
LW	11	Pat_Chapman	(substituted off) 47'
Substitutions:
LW	15	Janet Turner	(substituted on) 47'
Manager:
Martin Reagan

Linesmen:
Jan Almqvist (Sweden)
Matts Sjöström (Sweden)

Match rules

- 70 minutes.
- Maximum of two substitutions.

=== Second leg ===
27 May 1984
14:30 BST

England	1–0	Sweden
Curl 31'	Report
Penalties
Curl (penalty missed); Gallimore (penalty scored); Bampton (penalty scored); Hanson (penalty missed); Davis (penalty scored)	3–4	(penalty scored) Börjesson; (penalty scored) Andersson; (penalty missed) Johansson; (penalty scored) Jansson; (penalty scored) Sundhage

Kenilworth Road, Luton
Attendance: 2,567
Referee: Ignace Goris (Belgium)

England	Sweden

GK	1	Theresa Wiseman
RB	2	Carol Thomas (c)
CB	4	Lorraine Hanson
CB	5	Angela Gallimore
LB	3	Maggie Pearce
RM	6	Gillian Coultard
CM	7	Liz Deighan
LM	8	Debbie Bampton
RW	9	Linda Curl
CF	10	Kerry Davis
LW	11	Pat Chapman
Manager:
Martin Reagan

GK	1	Elisabeth Leidinge
RB	2	Ann Jansson
CB	3	Anette Börjesson (c)
CB	4	Angelica Burevik
LB	5	Mia Kåberg
RM	7	Eva Andersson
CM	6	Anna Svenjeby
LM	9	Karin Åhman-Svensson
RW	10	Lena Videkull	(substituted off) 35'
CF	11	Pia Sundhage
LW	8	Helen Johansson
Substitutions:
LW	15	Doris Uusitalo	(substituted on) 35'
Manager:
Ulf Lyfors

Linesmen:
B. Bellamy (England)
M. Dimblebee (England)

Match rules

- 70 minutes.
- No extra time.
- Penalty shoot-out if scores level.
- Maximum of two substitutions.

== Match ==
=== Summary ===
The final was tense 2 legged game which ended in defeat from England via a penalty shootout. The games were not broadcast on British television due to a lack of interest.
