= Sallie Jackson =

English footballer (born 1966)

Personal information
- Full name: Sallie Ann Jackson
- Date of birth: 1966
- Position: Defender

Senior career*
Years	Team	Apps	(Gls)
- Lowestoft Ladies
- Howbury Grange
- Friends of Fulham
- Norwich City
- ACF Milan
- Maidstone United

International career
1984-1985	England	6	(0)
- * Club domestic league appearances and goals

Sallie Ann Jackson (born 21 February 1966) is a former footballer who played as a centre back. She won 6 caps for the England Women's national team and was the 66th women capped by England, receiving her legacy number in 2022. She won the Women's FA Cup four times with four different clubs during the 1980s before going to play in Italy.

== Club career ==
Jackson's first victory in the Women's FA Cup came in the 1982 final playing for Lowestoft Ladies when they beat Cleveland Spartans 2–0 at Loftus Road. Her second came in 1984 whilst playing for Howbury Grange when they beat Doncaster Belles 4–2 in the final at Sincil Bank. Her third win was with Friends of Fulham in 1985 when they beat Doncaster Belles 2–0 at Craven Cottage. Jackson got an assist for the opening goal with a through ball to forward Cheryl McAdam. Her victory in 1985 made her the first women to win the competition with three different clubs.

Her fourth and final victory was achieved at Norwich who beat Doncaster Belles 4–3 at Carrow Road in 1986, with Jackson scoring Norwich's third goal. Her former Lowestoft teammates from the 1982 final Linda Curl, Vicky Johnson and Jackie Slack all played for Norwich that day under manager Maureen Martin. The win with Norwich in 1986 saw Jackson become the first women to win the competition with four different clubs, an achievement first matched by Debbie Bampton in 1996. She later played for a ladies team in Milan and then returned to England. In 1989 she was playing for Maidstone United.

== International career ==
Jackson made her international debut during the 1984 Mundialito tournament held in Italy, under England manager Martin Reagan. Her first game was against Belgium at Stadio Armando Picchi in Jesolo which finished 1–1. In total Jackson won 6 caps for England and was awarded legacy number 66 by England. In 2022 England Football announced that all 227 women that had represented England since 1972 would be given an official cap with their legacy number written on it. The caps were awarded on 18 November 2022 which was symbolic as it marked the 50th anniversary of England Women's first ever international against Scotland. Kay Cossington, the Football Association's head of women's technical, said "we hope they can reflect with pride on being part of a small group of women who have transformed football and made an everlasting impact on society".

== Honours ==
Lowestoft Ladies

- FA Women's Cup: 1981-82

Howbury Grange

- FA Women's Cup: 1983-84

Friends of Fulham

- FA Women's Cup: 1984–85

Norwich City

- FA Women's Cup: 1985–86
