= Jackie Slack =

English footballer

Personal information
- Date of birth: 25 July 1959 (age 67)
- Position: Left-back

Senior career*
Years	Team	Apps	(Gls)
- Lowestoft Ladies
- Norwich

International career
1984–1991	England	32	(1)
- * Club domestic league appearances and goals

Jackie Slack (born 25 July 1959) is a British former footballer who played as a left-back for the England women's national football team, playing thirty two matches and scoring one goal. She was part of the team at the 1987 Women's EURO held in Norway. Slack is also a two time winner of the Women's FA Cup.

== Club career ==
During her club career she won the 1982 WFA Cup final with Lowestoft Ladies F.C. They beat Cleveland Spartans 2-0 in the final held at Loftus Road, with Slack as captain. She won the WFA Cup for a second time in 1986 whilst playing for Norwich, after they beat Doncaster Belles 4-3 in the final at Carrow Road.

== England ==
Slack made her England debut at the 1984 Mundialito held in Italy. She played her first game at the Stadio Armando Picchi in Jesolo in a 1-1 draw against Belgium. In November 2022, Slack was recognized by The Football Association as one of the England national team's legacy players, and as the 64th women's player to be capped by England.

== Life outside football ==
Before making a name for herself in the football world, Slack was an England junior badminton player.

== Honours ==
=== Player ===
Lowestoft

- FA Women's Cup: 1982

Norwich

- FA Women's Cup: 1986
