= List of England women's national football team hat-tricks =

Since the first recognised match in November 1972, there have been 39 hat-tricks scored, by 23 footballers, for the England women's national football team. The first player to score a hat-trick in a recognised match was Pat Firth, who did so days after turning sixteen on 23 June 1973, to remain England's youngest hat-trick scorer. The first players to score a hat-trick after the Football Association formally incorporated women's football were Marieanne Spacey and Karen Walker, who both achieved the feat in England's 10–0 victory on 25 September 1993.

No England players have scored a hat-trick on their only international appearance, but two players have scored for England only through claimed hat-tricks: Danielle Carter, with two hat-tricks in consecutive appearances, and Gemma Davison, though the third of her goals was officially recorded as an own goal for the opposing team. England have never lost a match in which they have scored a hat-trick.

== Hat-tricks for England ==
As of 29 November 2025

No.	Date	Goals	Player	Opponent	Venue	Competition	Result (Note: The result is presented with England's score first.)	Ref
WFA era
1	23 June 1973	3	Pat Firth	Scotland	Manor Park, Nuneaton	Friendly	8–0	
2	19 April 1975	3	Sandra Choat	Switzerland	Stadion Schützenmatte, Basel		3–1	
3	23 May 1976	3	Pat Firth	Scotland	Southbury Road, Enfield	Home International Championship	5–1	
4	28 April 1977	3	Pat Chapman	Switzerland	Boothferry Park, Hull		9–1	
5	3 October 1982	4	Kerry Davis	Scotland	Boghead Park, Dumbarton	Euro qualifiers	4–0	
6	25 May 1985	5	Kerry Davis	Northern Ireland	Allen Park, Antrim	Euro qualifiers	8–1	
7	22 September 1985	3	Linda Curl	Republic of Ireland	Flower Lodge, Cork	Euro qualifiers	6–0	
8	16 March 1986	3	Kerry Davis	Northern Ireland	Ewood Park, Blackburn	Euro qualifiers	10–0	
9	11 April 1987	3	Marieanne Spacey	Northern Ireland	Elland Road, Leeds	Friendly	6–0	
10	20 April 1991	3	Marieanne Spacey	Scotland	Adams Park, High Wycombe	Friendly	5–0	
FA era
11	25 September 1993	4	Marieanne Spacey	Slovenia	Centralni stadion Bežigrad, Ljubljana	Euro qualifiers	10–0	
12	25 September 1993	3	Karen Walker	Slovenia	Centralni stadion Bežigrad, Ljubljana	Euro qualifiers	10–0	
13	9 March 1997	3	Joanne Broadhurst	Scotland	Bramall Lane, Sheffield	Friendly	6–0	
14	22 March 2001	3	Sue Smith	Spain	Kenilworth Road, Luton	Friendly	4–2	
15	27 October 2005	3	Kelly Smith	Hungary	Tapolca Stadium, Tapolca	World Cup qualifiers	13–0	
16	31 August 2006	3	Kelly Smith	Netherlands	The Valley, Charlton	World Cup qualifiers	4–0	
17	8 May 2008	3	Fara Williams	Belarus	Darida Stadium, Minsk	Euro qualifiers	6–1	
18	25 October 2009	3	Fara Williams	Malta	Bloomfield Road, Blackpool	World Cup qualifiers	8–0	
19	21 September 2013	3	Karen Carney	Belarus	Goldsands Stadium, Bournemouth	World Cup qualifiers	6–0	
20	26 September 2013	3	Toni Duggan	Turkey	Fratton Park, Portsmouth	World Cup qualifiers	8–0	
21	5 April 2014	3	Toni Duggan	Montenegro	American Express Community Stadium, Falmer	World Cup qualifiers	9–0	
22	17 September 2014	3	Eni Aluko	Montenegro	Stadion pod Malim brdom, Petrovac	World Cup qualifiers	10–0	
23	6 March 2015	3	Jodie Taylor	Australia	GSP Stadium, Nicosia	2015 Cyprus Women's Cup	3–0	
24	21 September 2015	3	Danielle Carter	Estonia	A. Le Coq Arena, Tallinn	Euro qualifiers	8–0	
25	4 June 2016	3	Karen Carney	Serbia	Adams Park, High Wycombe	Euro qualifiers	7–0	
26	15 September 2016	3	Danielle Carter	Estonia	Meadow Lane, Nottingham	Euro qualifiers	5–0	
27	19 July 2017	3	Jodie Taylor	Scotland	Stadion Galgenwaard, Utrecht	UEFA Women's Euro 2017	6–0	
28	23 February 2021	3	Ellen White	Northern Ireland	St George's Park, Burton upon Trent	Friendly	6–0	
29	23 October 2021	3	Beth Mead	Northern Ireland	Wembley Stadium, Wembley	World Cup qualifiers	4–0	
30	26 October 2021	3	Ella Toone	Latvia	Daugavas Stadions, Riga	World Cup qualifiers	10–0	
31	30 November 2021	3	Beth Mead	Latvia	Keepmoat Stadium, Doncaster	World Cup qualifiers	20–0	
32	30 November 2021	3	Ellen White	Latvia	Keepmoat Stadium, Doncaster	World Cup qualifiers	20–0	
33	30 November 2021	4	Lauren Hemp	Latvia	Keepmoat Stadium, Doncaster	World Cup qualifiers	20–0	
34	30 November 2021	3	Alessia Russo	Latvia	Keepmoat Stadium, Doncaster	World Cup qualifiers	20–0	
35	8 April 2022	4	Beth Mead	North Macedonia	Toše Proeski Arena, Skopje	World Cup qualifiers	10–0	
36	8 April 2022	3	Ella Toone	North Macedonia	Toše Proeski Arena, Skopje	World Cup qualifiers	10–0	
37	11 July 2022	3	Beth Mead	Norway	American Express Community Stadium, Falmer	UEFA Women's Euro 2022	8–0	
38	30 May 2025	3	Aggie Beever-Jones	Portugal	Wembley Stadium, Wembley	2025 UEFA Women's Nations League A	6–0	
39	29 November 2025	3	Georgia Stanway	China	Wembley Stadium, Wembley	Friendly	8–0	

=== Disputed hat-tricks ===
Results that have been claimed or reported as hat-tricks, but which official match reports do not list as hat-tricks.

Date	Goals	Player	Opponent	Venue	Competition	Result	Ref
1 November 1969 (Note: This match is not considered official)	3	Sue Lopez	Denmark	Stadio Mario Puchoz, Aosta	1969 Euro	3–4	
7 June 2016	3 (Note: The third was officially recorded as a Serbia own goal. After initially being kept out by the goalkeeper, Davison kicked the ball back into goal, but it touched a Serbian player on the way in.)	Gemma Davison	Serbia	Kuća fudbala, Stara Pazova	Euro qualifiers	7–0	

== Hat-tricks conceded by England ==
England has conceded seven hat-tricks; six of the games ended in losses, while the other was a 3–3 draw.

Date	Goals	Player	Team	Venue	Competition	Result	Ref
WFA era
18 August 1990	4	Carolina Morace	Italy	Wembley Stadium, Wembley	Friendly	1–4	
25 November 1990	3	Heidi Mohr	Germany	Adams Park, High Wycombe	Euro qualifiers	1–4	
30 June 1991	3	Gam Pedersen	Denmark	Nordby Stadion, Nordby	Friendly	3–3	
FA era
27 February 1997	3	Claudia Müller	Germany	Deepdale, Preston	Friendly	4–6	
9 May 1997	3	Mia Hamm	United States	Spartan Stadium, San Jose	Friendly	0–5	
4 June 2000	3	Marianne Pettersen	Norway	Melløs Stadion, Moss	Euro qualifiers	0–8	
17 May 2003	4	Cindy Parlow	United States	Legion Field, Birmingham	Friendly	0–6	

== Records ==
As of 29 November 2025

=== Most hat-tricks against an opponent ===
Hat-tricks by opponent
Rank	Opponent	Hat-tricks
1	Scotland	6
2	Latvia	5
2	Northern Ireland	5
4	Belarus	2
4	Estonia	2
4	Montenegro	2
4	North Macedonia	2
4	Slovenia	2
4	Switzerland	2
10	Australia	1
10	Hungary	1
10	Malta	1
10	Netherlands	1
10	Norway	1
10	Portugal	1
10	Republic of Ireland	1
10	Serbia	1
10	Spain	1
10	Turkey	1
10	China	1
Total		39

=== Most hat-tricks (player) ===
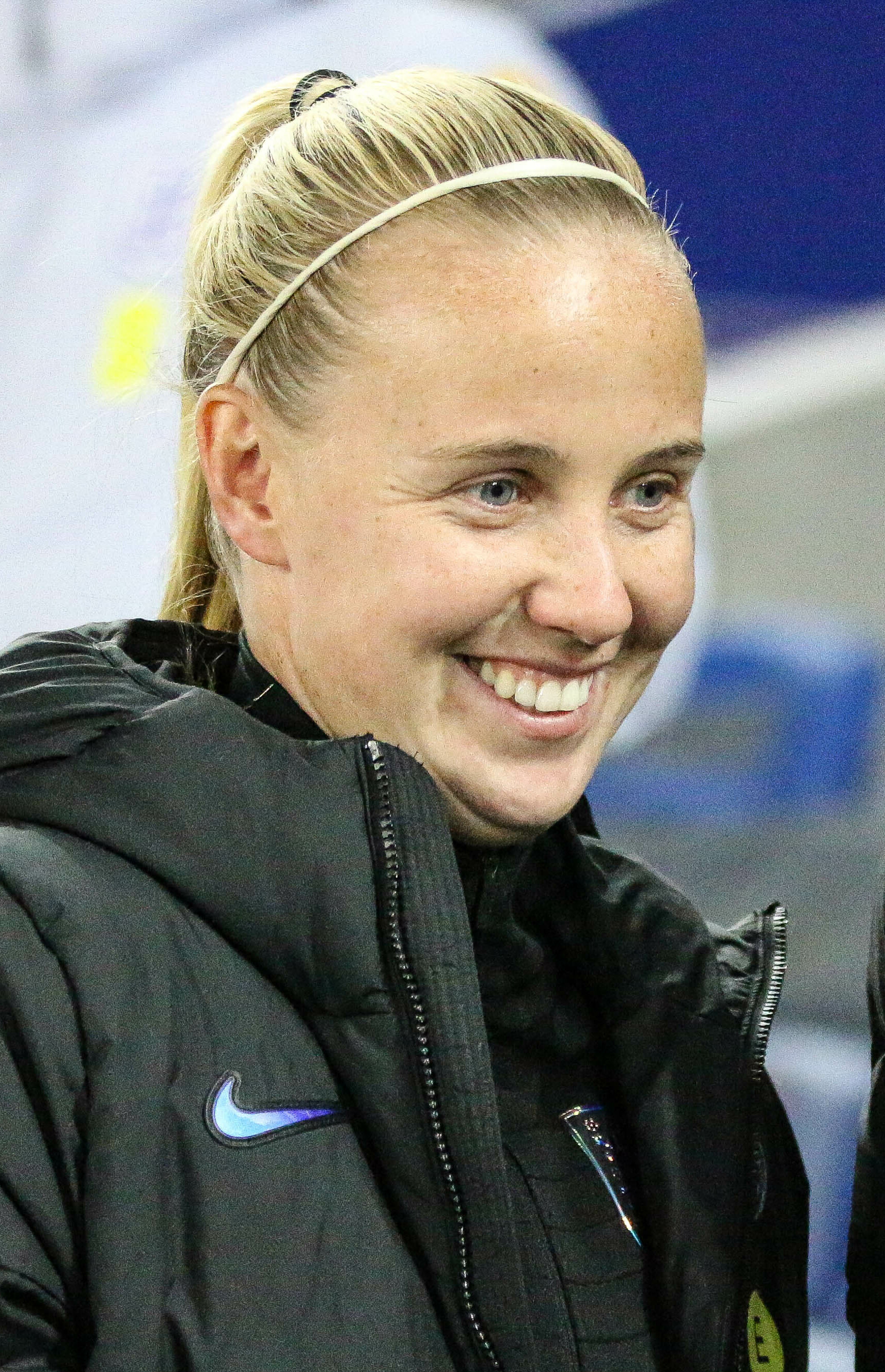
Beth Mead has scored the most England women’s hat-tricks with four, and the most goals in games when scoring a hat-trick with thirteen

Rank	Player	Hat-tricks	Goals
1	Beth Mead	4	13
2	Kerry Davis	3	12
3	Marieanne Spacey	3	10
4=	Karen Carney	2	6
4=	Danielle Carter	2	6
4=	Toni Duggan	2	6
4=	Pat Firth	2	6
4=	Kelly Smith	2	6
4=	Jodie Taylor	2	6
4=	Ella Toone	2	6
4=	Ellen White	2	6
4=	Fara Williams	2	6
13	Lauren Hemp	1	4
14=	Eni Aluko	1	3
14=	Aggie Beever-Jones	1	3
14=	Joanne Broadhurst	1	3
14=	Pat Chapman	1	3
14=	Sandra Choat	1	3
14=	Linda Curl	1	3
14=	Alessia Russo	1	3
14=	Sue Smith	1	3
14=	Georgia Stanway	1	3
14=	Karen Walker	1	3

=== Most hat-tricks under a manager ===
Rank	Manager	Hat-tricks	Tenure
1	Sarina Wiegman	11	2021–present
2	Mark Sampson	7	2014–2017
3	Martin Reagan	5	1979–1990
3	Hope Powell	5	1998–2013
5	Tom Tranter	3	1973–1979
5	Ted Copeland	3	1993–1998
7	Brent Hills	2	2006, 2013
8	John Adams	1	1973
8	Hege Riise	1	2021
10	Eric Worthington	0	1972
10	John Sims	0	1979
10	Mike Rawding	0	1979
10	John Bilton	0	1991–1993
10	Dick Bate	0	1998
10	Mo Marley	0	2017
10	Phil Neville	0	2017–2020

=== Matches with multiple England hat-tricks ===
Rank	Date	Opponent	Hat-tricks	Result
1	30 November 2021	Latvia	4	20–0
2=	25 September 1993	Slovenia	2	10–0
2=	8 April 2022	North Macedonia	2	10–0

=== Players to score a hat-trick by age ===
==== Youngest players (below 25) ====
Player	Hat-trick	DoB	Age
Pat Firth	23 June 1973	12 June 1957	16 years, 11 days
Sandra Choat	19 April 1975	1957/58	17/18 years
Kerry Davis	3 October 1982	2 August 1962	20 years, 62 days
Pat Chapman	28 April 1977	21 July 1956	20 years, 281 days
Marieanne Spacey	11 April 1987	13 February 1966	21 years, 57 days
Lauren Hemp	30 November 2021	7 August 2000	21 years, 115 days
Sue Smith	22 March 2001	24 November 1979	21 years, 118 days
Aggie Beever-Jones	30 May 2025	27 July 2003	21 years, 307 days
Ella Toone	26 October 2021	2 September 1999	22 years, 54 days
Toni Duggan	26 September 2013	25 July 1991	22 years, 63 days
Danielle Carter	21 September 2015	18 May 1993	22 years, 126 days
Alessia Russo	30 November 2021	8 February 1999	22 years, 295 days
Linda Curl	22 September 1985	c. 1962	approx. 23 years
Karen Walker	25 September 1993	29 July 1969	24 years, 58 days
Fara Williams	8 May 2008	25 January 1984	24 years, 104 days

==== Oldest players (25+) ====
Ellen White has scored two hat-tricks; at the time of scoring her first, she became England women's oldest hat-trick goalscorer, and has only been overtaken in this regard by herself.

Player	Hat-trick	DoB	Age
Ellen White	30 November 2021	9 May 1989	32 years, 205 days
Jodie Taylor	19 July 2017	17 May 1986	31 years, 63 days
Joanne Broadhurst	9 March 1997	27 November 1967	29 years, 102 days
Karen Carney	4 June 2016	1 August 1987	28 years, 308 days
Kelly Smith	31 August 2006	29 October 1978	27 years, 306 days
Marieanne Spacey	25 September 1993	13 February 1966	27 years, 224 days
Eni Aluko	17 September 2014	21 February 1987	27 years, 208 days
Beth Mead	11 July 2022	9 May 1995	27 years, 63 days
Georgia Stanway	29 November 2025	3 January 1999	26 years, 330 days
Fara Williams	25 October 2009	25 January 1984	25 years, 273 days

== See also ==
- England women's national football team records and statistics
- List of England national football team hat-tricks
