= List of England national football team hat-tricks =

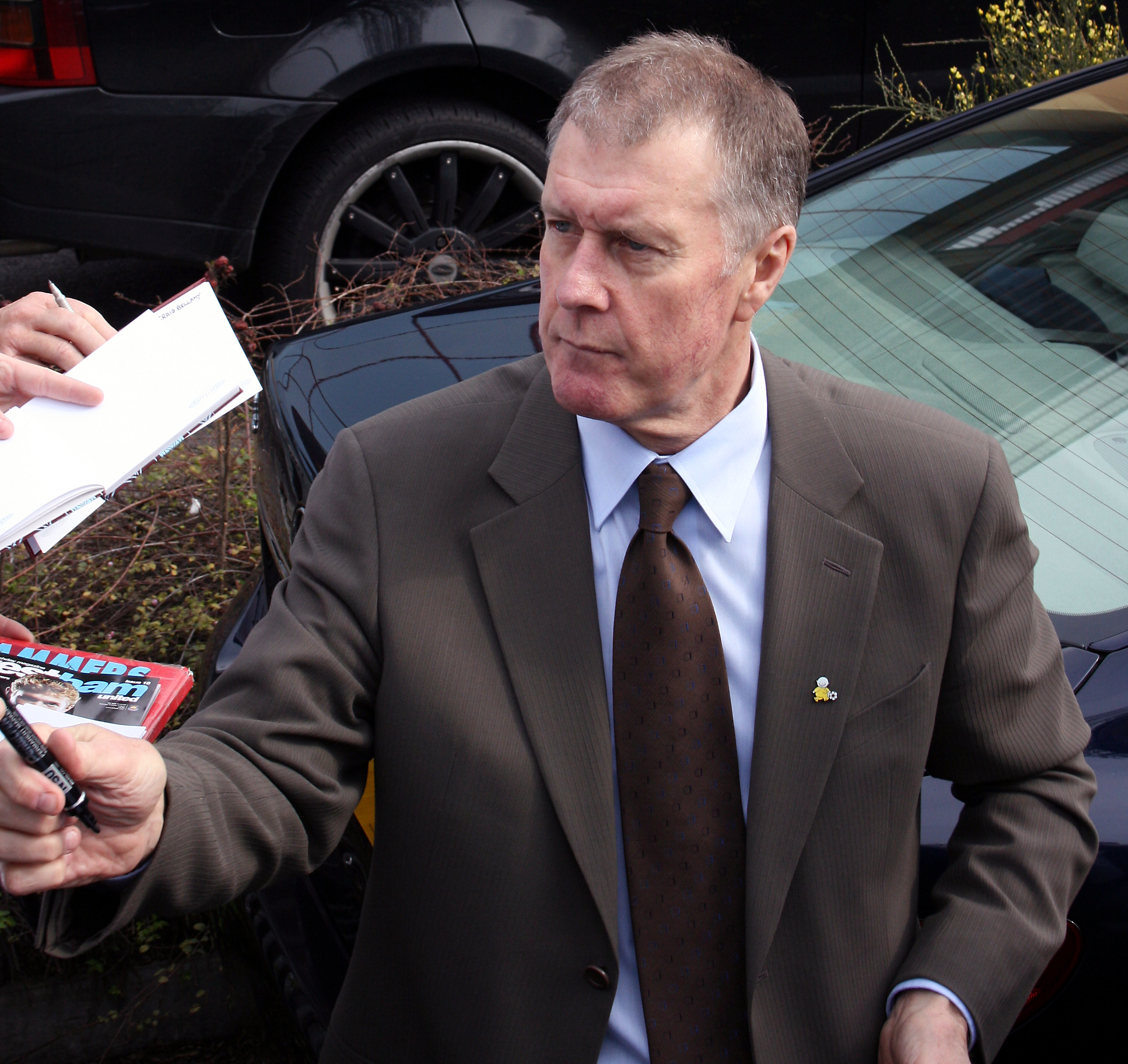
Geoff Hurst scored a hat-trick in the 1966 FIFA World Cup Final, which England won 4–2.

Since the inception of international association football matches in 1872, 59 England male footballers have scored three or more goals (a hat-trick) in a game. The first players to score a hat-trick for England were Howard Vaughton and Arthur Alfred Brown, both Aston Villa players; in a friendly match against Ireland in 1882, they scored nine goals between them. Four players, Vaughton, Steve Bloomer, Willie Hall and Malcolm Macdonald, have scored five goals in one match. Jimmy Greaves has scored the greatest number of hat-tricks, with six. Five players, Albert Allen, Frank Bradshaw, Walter Gilliat, John Veitch and John Yates, have scored hat-tricks on their only international appearance.

In the 1966 FIFA World Cup Final, Geoff Hurst scored a hat-trick, generally considered one of the most famous of all time. The most recent hat-trick was scored by Bukayo Saka in the 2026 FIFA World Cup match for third place against France in July 2026.

England have conceded eleven hat-tricks since 1872, the most recent being scored by Zlatan Ibrahimović who scored four goals in a 4–2 defeat by Sweden in a friendly match in November 2012. Richard Hofmann was the first player from outside the Home Nations to score a hat-trick against England, scoring three times for Germany in a friendly match in May 1930. Previously only the Scottish players John McDougall, George Ker, John Smith, Robert Smyth McColl and Alex Jackson had scored hat-tricks against England.

== Hat-tricks for England ==
Wartime internationals, not regarded as official matches, are not included in the list.

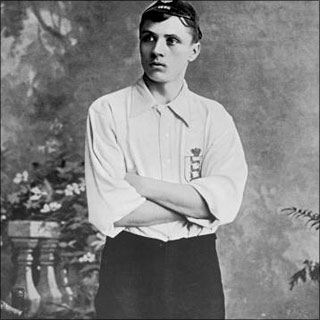
Steve Bloomer scored England's first hat-trick of the twentieth century.

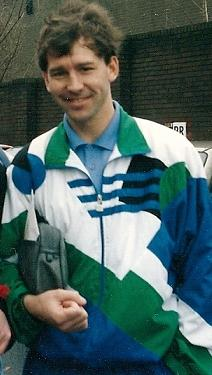
Bryan Robson scored a hat-trick in an 8–0 victory against Turkey in 1984.

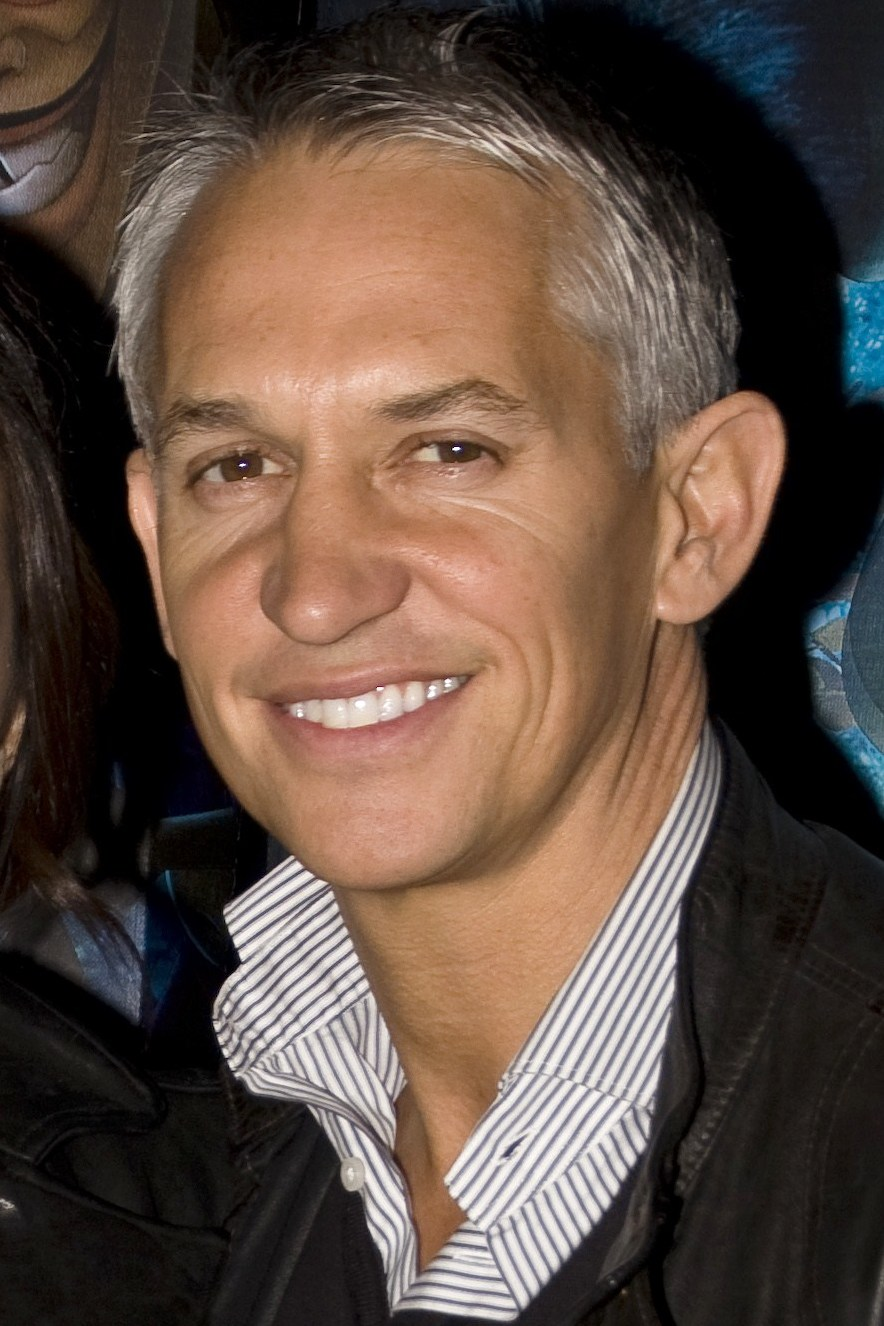
Gary Lineker scored five hat-tricks for England.

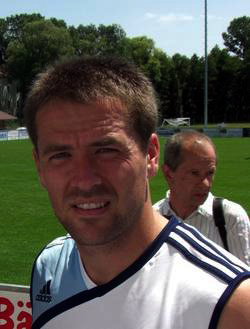
Michael Owen scored a hat-trick against Germany in 2001.

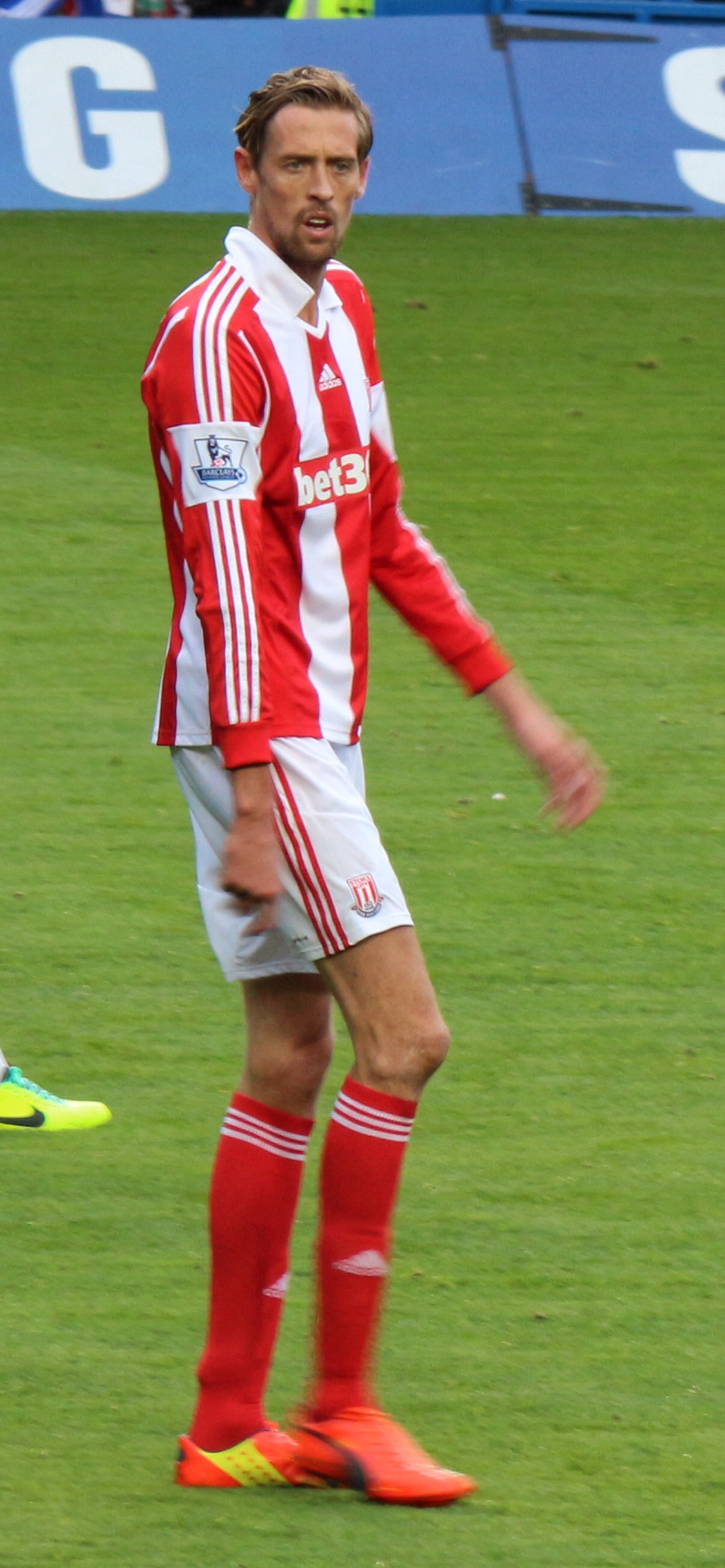
Peter Crouch scored a hat-trick in a friendly fixture against Jamaica in 2006.

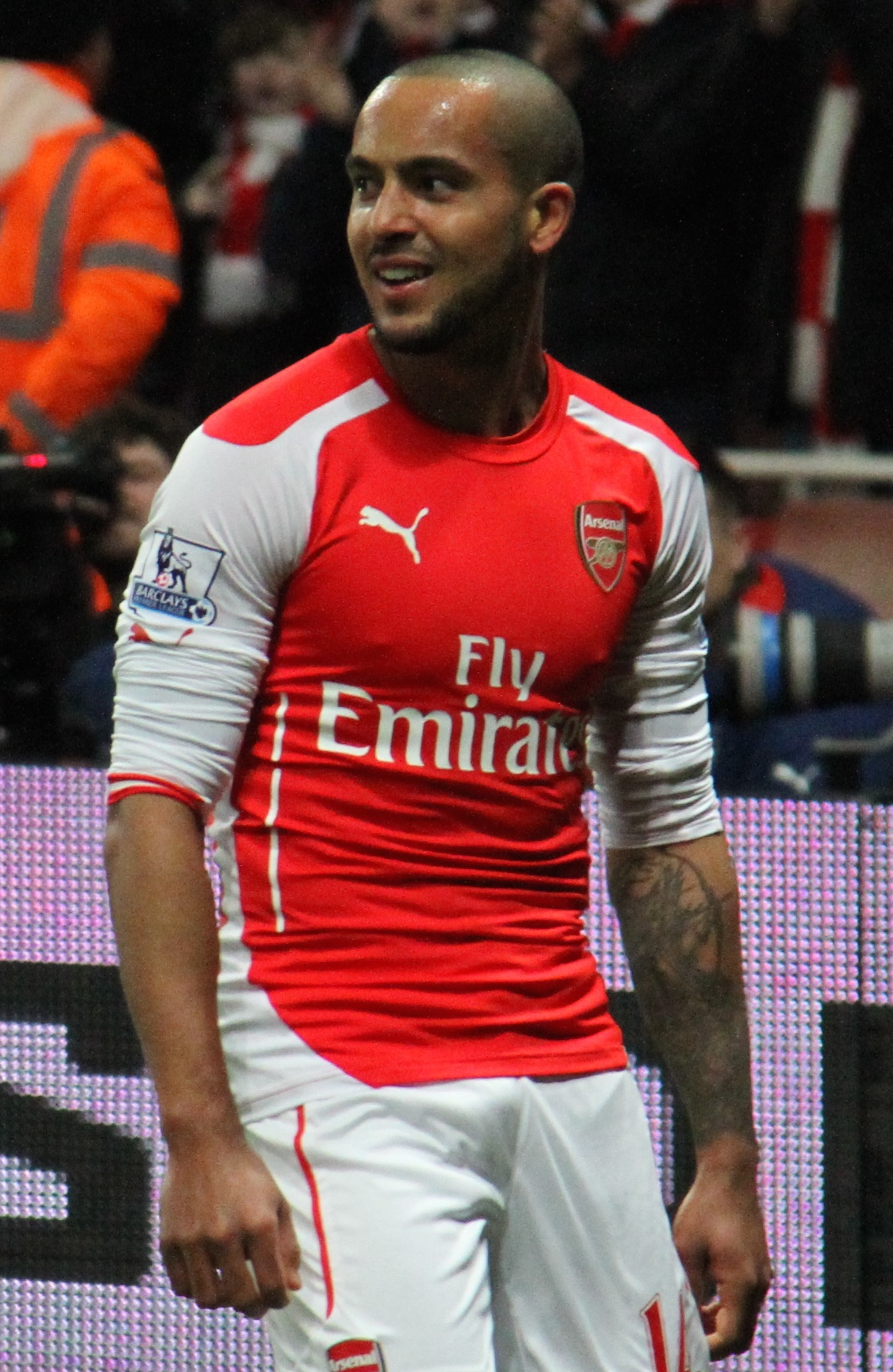
Theo Walcott scored three times against Croatia in a World Cup qualifying game in 2008.

No.	Date	Goals	Player	Opponent	Venue	Competition	Result (Note: The result is presented with England's score first.)	Ref
1	18 February 1882	5	Howard Vaughton	Ireland	Bloomfield, Belfast	Friendly	13–0	
2	18 February 1882	4	Arthur Alfred Brown	Ireland	Bloomfield, Belfast	Friendly	13–0	
3	3 February 1883	3	Clement Mitchell	Wales	Kensington Oval, London	Friendly	5–0	
4	23 February 1884	3	Henry Cursham	Ireland	Ulster Cricket Ground, Ballynafeigh, Belfast	1883–84 British Home Championship	8–1	
5	13 March 1886	4	Benjamin Spilsbury	Ireland	Ulster Cricket Ground, Ballynafeigh, Belfast	1885–86 British Home Championship	6–1	
6	5 February 1887	3	Tinsley Lindley	Ireland	Bramall Lane, Sheffield	1886–87 British Home Championship	7–0	
7	4 February 1888	3	Fred Dewhurst	Wales	Nantwich Road, Crewe	1887–88 British Home Championship	5–1	
8	7 April 1888	3	Albert Allen	Ireland	Ulster Cricket Ground, Ballynafeigh, Belfast	1887–88 British Home Championship	5–1	
9	2 March 1889	3	John Yates	Ireland	Anfield, Liverpool	1888–89 British Home Championship	6–1	
10	15 March 1890	3	Fred Geary	Ireland	Ulster Cricket Ground, Ballynafeigh, Belfast	1889–90 British Home Championship	9–1	
11	25 February 1893	3	Walter Gilliat	Ireland	Wellington Road, Perry Barr	1892–93 British Home Championship	6–1	
12	13 March 1893	3	Fred Spiksley	Wales	Victoria Ground, Stoke-on-Trent	1892–93 British Home Championship	6–0	
13	1 April 1893	3	Fred Spiksley (2)	Scotland	Athletic Ground, Richmond	1892–93 British Home Championship	5–2	
14	12 March 1894	3	John Veitch	Wales	Racecourse Ground, Wrexham	1893–94 British Home Championship	5–1	
15	16 March 1896	5	Steve Bloomer	Wales	Arms Park, Cardiff	1895–96 British Home Championship	9–1	
16	20 February 1897	3	Fred Wheldon	Ireland	Trent Bridge, Nottingham	1896–97 British Home Championship	6–0	
17	18 February 1899	4	Gilbert Smith	Ireland	Roker Park, Sunderland	1898–99 British Home Championship	13–2	
18	18 February 1899	4	Jimmy Settle	Ireland	Roker Park, Sunderland	1898–99 British Home Championship	13–2	
19	18 March 1901	4	Steve Bloomer (2)	Wales	St James' Park, Newcastle upon Tyne	1900–01 British Home Championship	6–0	
20	16 March 1908	3	Vivian Woodward	Wales	Racecourse Ground, Wrexham	1907–08 British Home Championship	7–1	
21	8 June 1908	3	Frank Bradshaw	Austria	Hohe Warte Stadium, Vienna	Friendly	11–1	
22	8 June 1908	4	Vivian Woodward (2)	Austria	Hohe Warte Stadium, Vienna	Friendly	11–1	
23	10 June 1908	4	George Hilsdon	Hungary	Millenáris Sporttelep, Budapest	Friendly	7–0	
24	31 May 1909	4	Vivian Woodward (3)	Hungary	Millenáris Sporttelep, Budapest	Friendly	8–2	
25	1 June 1909	3	Vivian Woodward (4)	Austria	Hohe Warte Stadium, Vienna	Friendly	8–1	
26	10 February 1912	3	Harold Fleming	Ireland	Dalymount Park, Dublin	1911–12 British Home Championship	6–1	
27	24 May 1926	3	Frank Osborne	Belgium	Kielstadion, Antwerp	Friendly	5–3	
28	11 May 1927	3	Dixie Dean	Belgium	Stadium in Molenbeek, Molenbeek, Brussels	Friendly	9–1	
29	21 May 1927	3	Dixie Dean (2)	Luxembourg	Stade de la Frontière, Esch-sur-Alzette	Friendly	5–2	
30	11 May 1929	4	George Camsell	Belgium	Stade Joseph Marien, Brussels	Friendly	5–1	
31	20 November 1929	3	George Camsell (2)	Wales	Stamford Bridge, London	1929–30 British Home Championship	6–0	
32	2 December 1936	3	Ted Drake	Hungary	Arsenal Stadium, London	Friendly	6–2	
33	17 May 1937	3	Freddie Steele	Sweden	Råsunda Stadium, Solna, Stockholm	Friendly	4–0	
34	23 October 1937	3	George Mills	Ireland	Windsor Park, Belfast	1937–38 British Home Championship	5–1	
35	1 December 1937	3	Stanley Matthews	Czechoslovakia	White Hart Lane, London	Friendly	5–4	
36	16 November 1938	5	Willie Hall	Ireland	Old Trafford, Manchester	1938–39 British Home Championship	7–0	
37	28 September 1946	3	Wilf Mannion	Ireland	Windsor Park, Belfast	1946–47 British Home Championship	7–2	
38	27 November 1946	4	Tommy Lawton	Netherlands	Leeds Road, Huddersfield	Friendly	8–2	
39	25 May 1947	4	Stan Mortensen	Portugal	Estádio Nacional, Jamor	Friendly	10–0	
40	25 May 1947	4	Tommy Lawton (2)	Portugal	Estádio Nacional, Jamor	Friendly	10–0	
41	19 November 1947	3	Stan Mortensen (2)	Sweden	Arsenal Stadium, London	Friendly	4–2	
42	9 October 1948	3	Stan Mortensen (3)	Ireland	Windsor Park, Belfast	1949 British Home Championship	6–2	
43	15 October 1949	3	Jackie Milburn	Wales	Ninian Park, Cardiff	1950 FIFA World Cup qualifier 1949–50 British Home Championship	4–1	
44	16 November 1949	4	Jack Rowley	Ireland	Maine Road, Manchester	1950 FIFA World Cup qualifier 1949–50 British Home Championship	9–2	
45	14 May 1950	4	Tom Finney	Portugal	Estádio Nacional, Jamor	Friendly	5–3	
46	10 November 1954	3	Roy Bentley	Wales	Wembley Stadium, London	1953–54 British Home Championship	3–2	
47	2 April 1955	4	Dennis Wilshaw	Scotland	Wembley Stadium, London	1954–55 British Home Championship	7–2	
48	5 December 1956	3	Tommy Taylor	Denmark	Molineux Stadium, Wolverhampton	1958 FIFA World Cup qualifier	5–2	
49	8 May 1957	3	Tommy Taylor (2)	Republic of Ireland	Wembley Stadium, London	1958 FIFA World Cup qualifier	5–1	
50	22 October 1958	3	Johnny Haynes	Soviet Union	Wembley Stadium, London	Friendly	5–0	
51	28 May 1959	3	Bobby Charlton	United States	Wrigley Field, Los Angeles	Friendly	8–1	
52	19 October 1960	3	Bobby Charlton (2)	Luxembourg	Stade Municipal, Luxembourg City	1962 FIFA World Cup qualifier	9–0	
53	19 October 1960	3	Jimmy Greaves	Luxembourg	Stade Municipal, Luxembourg City	1962 FIFA World Cup qualifier	9–0	
54	15 April 1961	3	Jimmy Greaves (2)	Scotland	Wembley Stadium, London	1960–61 British Home Championship	9–3	
55	10 May 1961	3	Bobby Charlton (3)	Mexico	Wembley Stadium, London	Friendly	8–0	
56	20 May 1962	3	Jimmy Greaves (3)	Peru	Estadio Nacional de Lima, Lima	Friendly	4–0	
57	5 June 1963	3	Bobby Charlton (4)	Switzerland	St. Jakob-Park, Basel	Friendly	8–1	
58	20 November 1963	4	Jimmy Greaves (4)	Northern Ireland	Wembley Stadium, London	1962–63 British Home Championship	8–3	
59	20 November 1963	3	Terry Paine	Northern Ireland	Wembley Stadium, London	1962–63 British Home Championship	8–3	
60	17 May 1964	3	Johnny Byrne	Portugal	Estádio Nacional, Jamor	Friendly	4–3	
61	27 May 1964	4	Roger Hunt	United States	Downing Stadium, New York City	Friendly	10–0	
62	27 May 1964	3	Fred Pickering	United States	Downing Stadium, New York City	Friendly	10–0	
63	3 October 1964	3	Jimmy Greaves (5)	Northern Ireland	Windsor Park, Belfast	1963–64 British Home Championship	4–3	
64	29 June 1966	4	Jimmy Greaves (6)	Norway	Ullevaal Stadion, Oslo	Friendly	6–1	
65	30 July 1966	3	Geoff Hurst	West Germany	Wembley Stadium, London	1966 FIFA World Cup final	4–2	
66	12 March 1969	3	Geoff Hurst (2)	France	Wembley Stadium, London	Friendly	5–0	
67	16 April 1975	5	Malcolm Macdonald	Cyprus	Wembley Stadium, London	1976 European Championship qualifier	5–0	
68	15 December 1982	3	Luther Blissett	Luxembourg	Wembley Stadium, London	1984 European Championship qualifier	9–0	
69	14 November 1984	3	Bryan Robson	Turkey	Besiktas Inönü Stadyumu, Istanbul	1986 FIFA World Cup qualifier	8–0	
70	16 October 1985	3	Gary Lineker	Turkey	Wembley Stadium, London	1986 FIFA World Cup qualifier	5–0	
71	11 June 1986	3	Gary Lineker (2)	Poland	Estadio Universitario, Monterrey	1986 FIFA World Cup finals	3–0	
72	18 February 1987	4	Gary Lineker (3)	Spain	Santiago Bernabéu Stadium, Madrid	Friendly	4–2	
73	14 October 1987	3	Gary Lineker (4)	Turkey	Wembley Stadium, London	1988 European Championship qualifier	8–0	
74	12 June 1991	4	Gary Lineker (5)	Malaysia	Stadium Merdeka, Kuala Lumpur	Friendly	4–2	
75	17 February 1993	4	David Platt	San Marino	Wembley Stadium, London	1994 FIFA World Cup qualifier	6–0	
76	17 November 1993	4	Ian Wright	San Marino	Stadio Renato Dall'Ara, Bologna	1994 FIFA World Cup qualifier	7–1	
77	27 March 1999	3	Paul Scholes	Poland	Wembley Stadium, London	2000 European Championship qualifier	3–1	
78	4 September 1999	3	Alan Shearer	Luxembourg	Wembley Stadium, London	2000 European Championship qualifier	6–0	
79	1 September 2001	3	Michael Owen	Germany	Olympiastadion, Munich	2002 FIFA World Cup qualifier	5–1	
80	31 May 2005	3	Michael Owen (2)	Colombia	Giants Stadium, New York City	Friendly	3–2	
81	3 June 2006	3	Peter Crouch	Jamaica	Old Trafford, Manchester	Friendly	6–0	
82	10 September 2008	3	Theo Walcott	Croatia	Maksimir Stadium, Zagreb	2010 FIFA World Cup qualifier	4–1	
83	3 September 2010	3	Jermain Defoe	Bulgaria	Wembley Stadium, London	2012 European Championship qualifier	4–0	
84	24 June 2018	3	Harry Kane	Panama	Nizhny Novgorod Stadium, Nizhny Novgorod	2018 FIFA World Cup finals	6–1	
85	22 March 2019	3	Raheem Sterling	Czech Republic	Wembley Stadium, London	2020 European Championship qualifier	5–0	
86	7 September 2019	3	Harry Kane (2)	Bulgaria	Wembley Stadium, London	2020 European Championship qualifier	4–0	
87	14 November 2019	3	Harry Kane (3)	Montenegro	Wembley Stadium, London	2020 European Championship qualifier	7–0	
88	12 November 2021	3	Harry Kane (4)	Albania	Wembley Stadium, London	2022 FIFA World Cup qualifier	5–0	
89	15 November 2021	4	Harry Kane (5)	San Marino	San Marino Stadium, Serravalle	2022 FIFA World Cup qualifier	10–0	
90	19 June 2023	3	Bukayo Saka	North Macedonia	Old Trafford, Manchester	2024 European Championship qualifier	7–0	
91	18 July 2026	3	Bukayo Saka (2)	France	Hard Rock Stadium, Miami Gardens	2026 FIFA World Cup match for third place	6–4	

== Hat-tricks conceded by England ==
England have conceded eleven hat-tricks, the first five of which were scored by players from Scotland. England have lost ten of the eleven matches in which they have conceded a hat-trick; the other was a 3–3 draw against Germany in 1930.

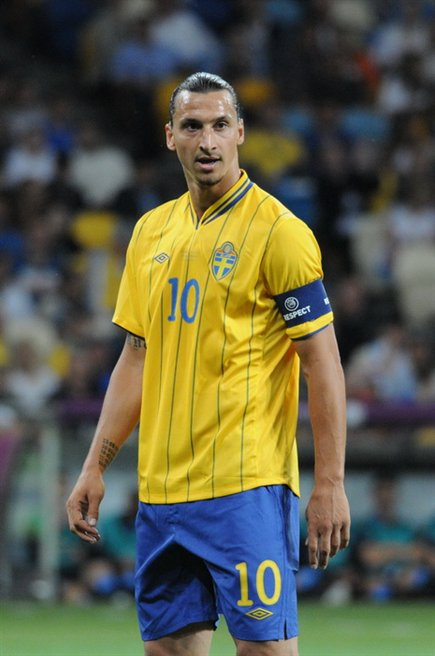
Zlatan Ibrahimović scored four goals against England. He achieved the feat for Sweden in 2012 at the opening game of the Friends Arena.

Date	Goals	Player	Opponent	Venue	Competition	Result	Ref(s)
2 March 1878	3	John McDougall	Scotland	Hampden Park, Glasgow	Friendly	2–7	
13 March 1880	3	George Ker	Scotland	Hampden Park, Glasgow	Friendly	4–5	
12 March 1881	3	John Smith	Scotland	Kennington Oval, London	Friendly	1–6	
7 April 1900	3	Robert Smyth McColl	Scotland	Celtic Park, Glasgow	1899–1900 British Home Championship	1–4	
31 March 1928	3	Alex Jackson	Scotland	Wembley Stadium, London	1927–28 British Home Championship	1–5	
10 May 1930	3	Richard Hofmann	Germany	Deutsches Stadion, Berlin	Friendly	3–3	
25 November 1953	3	Nándor Hidegkuti	Hungary	Wembley Stadium, London	Friendly	3–6	
11 May 1958	3	Aleksandar Petaković	Yugoslavia	Jugoslavija Narodna Armia, Belgrade	Friendly	0–5	
17 May 1959	3	Juan Seminario	Peru	Estadio Nacional, Lima	Friendly	1–4	
15 June 1988	3	Marco van Basten	Netherlands	Rheinstadion, Düsseldorf	1988 European Championship finals	1–3	
14 November 2012	4	Zlatan Ibrahimović	Sweden	Friends Arena, Solna Municipality	Friendly	2–4	

== Statistics ==
The following table lists the number of hat-tricks scored by English
players who have scored two or more hat-tricks.

Multiple hat-tricks
Rank	Player	Hat-tricks
1	Jimmy Greaves	6
2	Gary Lineker	5
2	Harry Kane	5
4	Vivian Woodward	4
4	Bobby Charlton	4
6	Stan Mortensen	3
7	Steve Bloomer	2
7	Fred Spiksley	2
7	Dixie Dean	2
7	George Camsell	2
7	Tommy Lawton	2
7	Tommy Taylor	2
7	Geoff Hurst	2
7	Michael Owen	2
7	Bukayo Saka	2

Hat-tricks by competition (Note: Two hat-tricks have been scored for two competitions at the same time, thus 91 + 2 = 93.)
Competition	Hat-tricks
Friendlies	34
British Home Championship	31
UEFA European Championship qualifying	10
UEFA European Championship	0
FIFA World Cup qualification	14
FIFA World Cup	4
Total	93

Hat-tricks by opponent
Rank	Opponent	Hat-tricks
1	Ireland (incl. Northern Ireland)	21
2	Wales	10
3	Luxembourg	5
4	Portugal	4
5	Austria	3
5	Belgium	3
5	Hungary	3
5	San Marino	3
5	Scotland	3
5	Turkey	3
5	United States	3
12	Bulgaria	2
12	Czech Republic (incl. Czechoslovakia)	2
12	France	2
12	Germany (incl. West Germany)	2
12	Poland	2
12	Sweden	2
17	Albania	1
17	Colombia	1
17	Croatia	1
17	Cyprus	1
17	Denmark	1
17	Jamaica	1
17	Republic of Ireland	1
17	Malaysia	1
17	Mexico	1
17	Montenegro	1
17	Netherlands	1
17	North Macedonia	1
17	Norway	1
17	Panama	1
17	Peru	1
17	Soviet Union	1
17	Spain	1
17	Switzerland	1
Total		91

== See also ==
- England national football team records and statistics
- List of England women's national football team hat-tricks
- List of Scotland national football team hat-tricks
- List of Wales national football team hat-tricks
- List of Republic of Ireland national football team hat-tricks
- List of Germany national football team hat-tricks
- List of France national football team hat-tricks
- List of Spain national football team hat-tricks
- List of Portugal national football team hat-tricks
