= Vicky Johnson =

English footballer

Vicky Sartain (nee Johnson)
Personal information
- Birth name: Vicky Johnson
- Position: Right-back

Senior career*
Years	Team	Apps	(Gls)
- Spurs Ladies
- Lowestoft Ladies F.C.
- Norwich City Women F.C.

International career
1980‍–‍1982	England	5	(1)
- * Club domestic league appearances and goals

Vicky Johnson is a former England women's international footballer who won five caps as a defender and scored one goal. Johnson played for Lowestoft Ladies with whom she won the 1982 WFA Cup final. She won the tournament for a second time in the 1986 WFA Cup final with Norwich City Women

== Club career ==
Johnson was playing for Spurs Ladies when she received her first international cap. She won the Women's FA Cup for the first time in 1982 with Lowestoft Ladies after they defeated Cleveland Spartans 2‍–‍0 in the final at Loftus Road. Maureen Martin signed her to Norwich where she won her second WFA winners medal in 1986. They beat Doncaster Rovers Belles at Carrow Road 4‍–‍3.

== International career ==
Vicky Johnson debuted for England in 1980 against Belgium. In November 2022, Johnson was recognized by The Football Association as one of the England national team's legacy players, and as the 50th women's player to be capped by England.

== Honours ==
Lowestoft Ladies F.C.

- FA Women's Cup: 1982

Norwich City

- FA Women's Cup: 1986
