= Maureen Reynolds =

English footballer

Maureen Martin
Personal information
- Birth name: Maureen Reynolds
- Position: Defender

Senior career*
| Years | Team | Apps | (Gls) |
| 1975-81/82 | Lowestoft Ladies | | |
| 1982–83 | Norwich City | | |

International career
| 1980–81 | England | 5 | (2) |

Managerial career
- 1982-87: Norwich City
- * Club domestic league appearances and goals

Maureen Martin (née Reynolds) is a former England women's international footballer and manager of Norwich City Women FC with whom she won the 1986 WFA Cup final.

== Club career ==
Martin started her football career playing for a local club near Norwich called Costessey LFC. She then signed for Lowestoft Ladies F.C. and won the East Anglian League and league cup double in 1975. She was captain of the Lowestoft side that reached the 1979 WFA Cup final where they lost 1–0 to Southampton WFC.

== International career ==
Martin represented England five times. She made her England debut against Belgium in 1980 and in a subsequent match scored twice against Republic of Ireland at Dalymount Park, Dublin. In November 2022 Martin was recognized by The Football Association as one of the England national team's legacy players, and as the 48th women's player to be capped by England.

== Managerial career ==
Martin's greatest managerial achievement was winning the Women's FA Cup with Norwich in 1986. Her side triumphed over Doncaster Rovers Belles 4–3 with the match coincidentally being held at Carrow Road. She formed the original Norwich ladies team in 1982 whom she nicknamed 'the fledgelings' at that time. After Lowestoft Ladies disbanded, Martin signed several of their players including Linda Curl, Sallie Jackson and Vicky Johnson. The club won the East Anglian League and league cup double in the 1982–83 season and reached the semi-final of the WFA Cup in 1985. During her time at Norwich, Martin was a player-manager, non-playing manager, coach and club secretary. She left the club after the 1986–87 season.

== Honours ==
Norwich City

- FA Women's Cup: 1985–86
