= 1986 WFA Cup final =

1986 WFA Cup Final
- Event: 1985–86 WFA Cup
Norwich City	Doncaster Belles
4	3
- Date: 4 May 1986
- Venue: Carrow Road, Norwich
- Referee: Ian J Borrett (Harleston)

The 1986 WFA Cup Final was the 16th final of the WFA Cup, England's primary cup competition for women's football teams. The showpiece event was played under the auspices of the Women's Football Association (WFA). Norwich City and Doncaster Belles contested the match at Carrow Road in Norwich on 4 May 1986. Norwich City won the match 4–3.

== Match details ==
4 May 1986
14:00 BST

Norwich City	4–3	Doncaster Belles
Curl 16'; Colk 40'; Jackson 50'; Lawrence 80+2'	Report	Hanson 26'; Walker 27', 75'

Carrow Road, Norwich
Referee: Ian J Borrett (Harleston)

GK	1	(England) Julie Page
DF	2	(England) Kate Purdom
DF	3	(England) Miranda Colk
DF	4	(England) Sallie Jackson
DF	5	(England) Jackie Slack
MF	6	(England) Tracey Ives-Keeler (c)
MF	7	(England) Veronica Price
MF	8	(England) Vanessa Kemp
MF	9	(England) Linda Curl
FW	10	(England) Marianne Lawrence
FW	11	(England) Vicky Johnson
Substitutes:
FW	12	(England) Julie Bowler
GK	13	(England) Sue Steel
Manager:
(England) Maureen Martin

GK	1	(England) Tracey Davidson
DF	2	(England) Doreen Jones
DF	3	(England) Jackie Mayes
DF	4	(England) Jackie Sherrard
DF	5	(England) Loraine Hunt
MF	6	(England) Toni Evans
MF	7	(England) Jill Hanson
MF	8	(England) Sheila Stocks
MF	9	(England) Karen Walker
FW	10	(England) Karen Skillcorn
FW	11	(England) Debbie Preston
Substitutes:
	12	(England) Carol Carr
FW	13	(England) Samantha Eyre
Manager:
(England) Mick Sherrard
