= Jarhois =

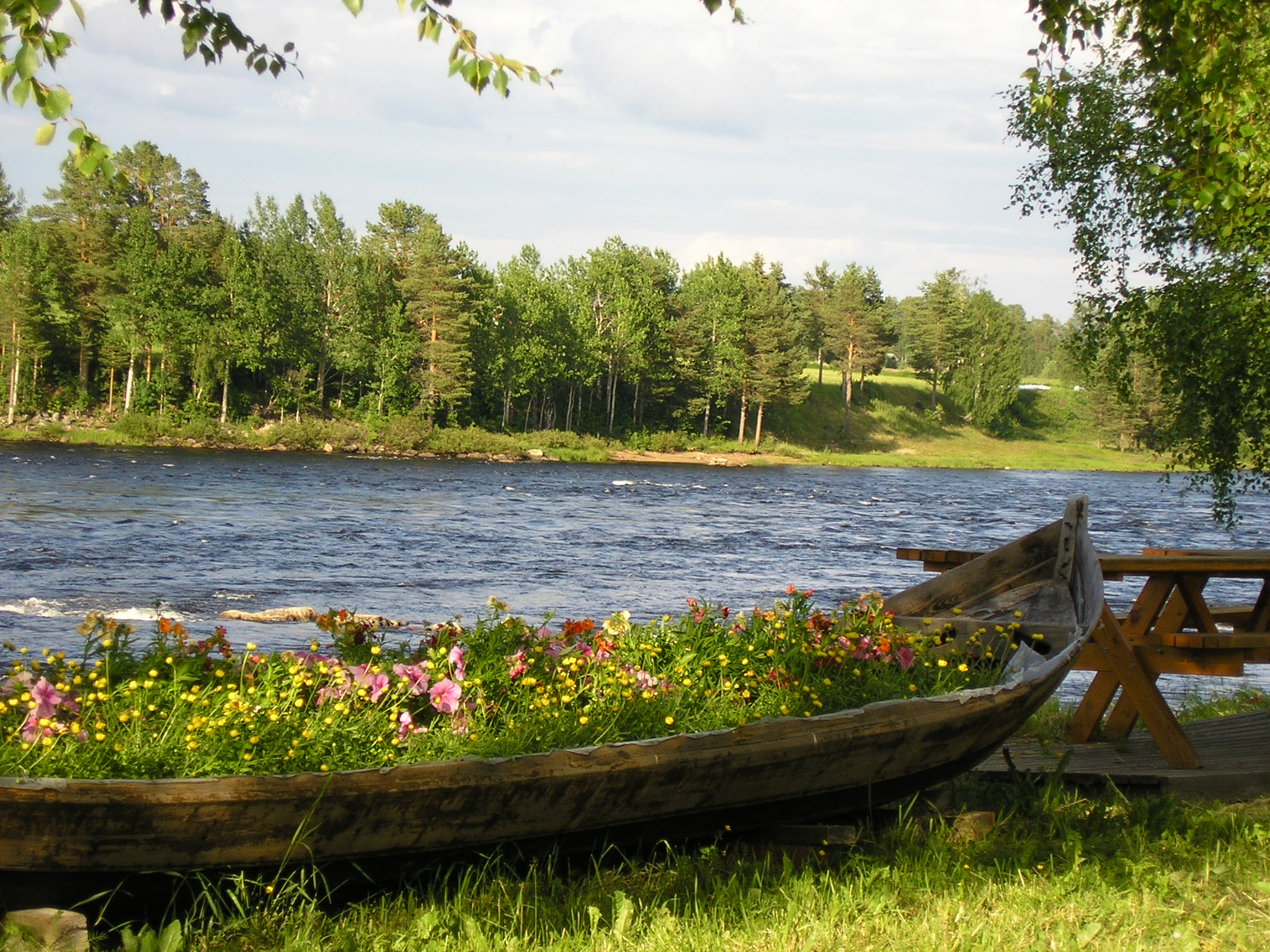

- Location within Norrbotten Location within Sweden
- Coordinates: 66°57′02″N 23°50′58″E
- Country: Sweden
- Municipality: Pajala Municipality
- Time zone: UTC+1 (CET)
  - Summer (DST): UTC+2 (CEST)

Jarhois is a village on the Torne River in Pajala Municipality, Sweden.

The most notable resident from Jarhois is the female footballer Doris Uusitalo.

According to 1890 Swedish census, Jarhois had 97 residents also in July 2016, according to the magazine Ratsit, there was only 51 people over the age of 16 living in Jarhois.
