= Marika Domanski-Lyfors =

Swedish footballer and coach (born 1960)

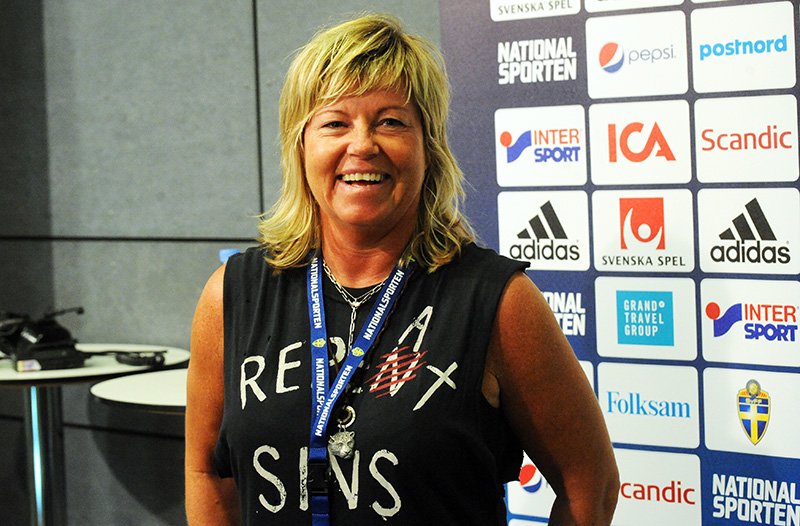
- Domanski-Lyfors in 2014

Personal information
- Full name: Marika Susan Domanski-Lyfors
- Date of birth: 17 May 1960 (age 66)
- Place of birth: Gothenburg, Sweden
- Position: Defender

Senior career*
Years	Team	Apps	(Gls)
1971–1974	Nödinge SK		
1975–1979	Surte IS		
1980–1985	Jitex BK		
1986–1988	GAIS		

Managerial career
- 1989–1993: Tyresö FF
- 1991–1993: Sweden women U20
- 1992–1996: Sweden women (assistant)
- 1996–2005: Sweden women
- 2005–2007: Sweden women U21
- 2007: China women
- * Club domestic league appearances and goals

Marika Susan Domanski-Lyfors (born 17 May 1960), née Marika Susan Domanski, is a Swedish football coach and former player. She was head coach of the Sweden women's national team from September 1996 until June 2005 and also coached the China women's national team during 2007. She is nicknamed Mackan.

== Playing career ==
As a Jitex BK player, Domanski-Lyfors won two League Championships (1981 and 1984) and three Swedish Cups (1981, 1982 and 1984). All of Jitex's regular players except left-back Domanski-Lyfors were capped at international level, because national team coach Ulf Lyfors did not rate her as a player. Marika disputed Ulf's judgement, but forgave him to the extent that the two were later married and had son Joakim.

== Managerial career ==
Domanski-Lyfors was manager of Tyresö FF from 1989 to 1993.

Her own nine-year spell in charge of the senior Sweden women's national team was considered a success. During her first international game as Swedish head coach, Sweden won against Italy, 1–0, in Turin on 9 October 1996. The team were runners-up in UEFA Women's Euro 2001 and the 2003 FIFA Women's World Cup, beaten by Germany in the final of both competitions.

After returning to a role with the Sweden women's national under-21 team, Domanski-Lyfors accepted an offer to become head coach of the China women's national team in March 2007. She oversaw an improvement in the team's results and guided the hosts to the quarter finals of the 2007 FIFA Women's World Cup.

At the tournament, the Chinese hosts engaged in surveillance and intimidation of first round opponents Denmark. Domanski-Lyfors and her assistant Pia Sundhage were unaware of the incidents and Danish coach Kenneth Heiner-Møller absolved them of any blame, although he refused to shake hands after the match.

The Chinese wanted Domanski-Lyfors to stay on for the 2008 Olympics, but she decided against extending her contract. In November 2007 she was appointed a technical director of the Swedish Football Association (SvFF).

== In popular culture ==
Marika Domanski-Lyfors can be seen in the 2013 Sveriges Television documentary television series The Other Sport.

== Personal life ==
Domanski-Lyfors was married to Ulf Lyfors until his death in February 2022.
