= List of France national football team hat-tricks =

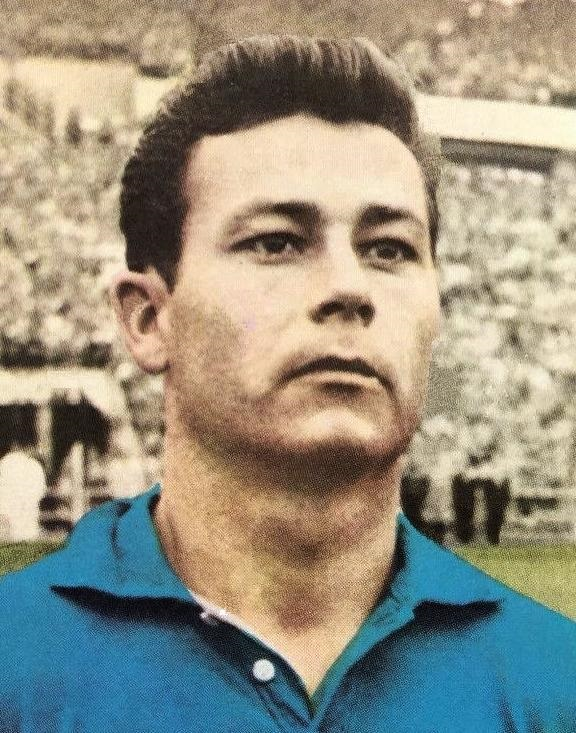
Just Fontaine, scorer of five hat-tricks for France.

Since France's first international association football match in 1904, there have been 28 occasions when a French player has scored three or more goals (a hat-trick) in a game. The first hat-trick was scored by Eugène Maës against Italy in 1912. The record for the most goals scored in an international by a French player is five, which has been achieved on two occasions: by Maës against Luxembourg in 1913, and by Thadée Cisowski against Belgium in 1956.

Just Fontaine holds the record for the most hat-tricks scored by a French player, with five between 1953 and 1959. Two of these came at the 1958 World Cup finals, when France finished in third place. In the 1984 European Championship, Michel Platini scored hat-tricks in consecutive first-round matches, against Belgium and Yugoslavia. Kylian Mbappé became the second-ever player to score a hat-trick in a World Cup final when he did so in 2022 against Argentina. The last French player to score a hat-trick was Ousmane Dembélé, who scored three times against Norway at the 2026 World Cup.

France have conceded 41 hat-tricks in their history, 31 of which came before the Second World War. In the post-war period, the only player to have scored two hat-tricks against France is Pelé; the first of these occurred in the 1958 World Cup semi-finals. Pelé is also the only non-European player to have scored a hat-trick against France. The Danish forward Sophus Nielsen holds the record for the most goals scored against France in a match, with ten in a 17–1 win at the 1908 Olympic Games in London. England's Bukayo Saka scored the most recent hat-trick against France, coming at the 2026 World Cup third-place play-off.

== Hat-tricks for France ==
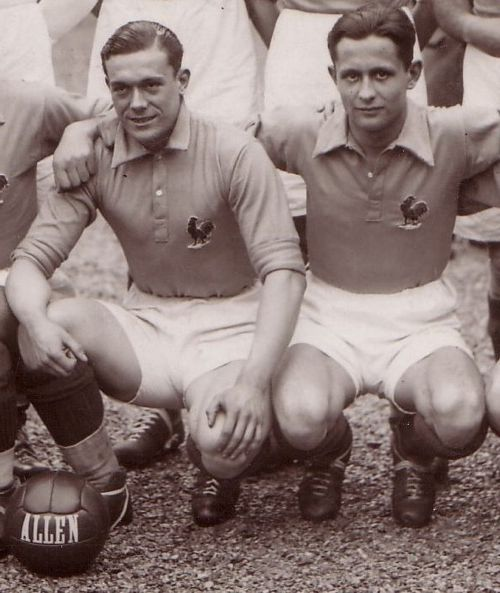
Jean Nicolas (left) scored two hat-trick for France in 1934.

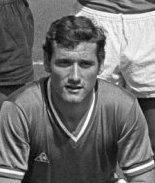
Hervé Revelli scored a hat-trick against Norway in a World Cup qualifier in 1969.

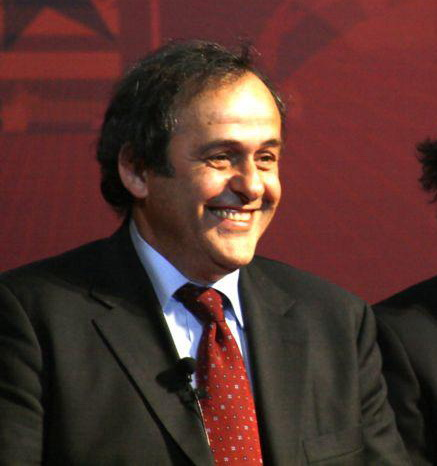
Michel Platini scored two hat-tricks at the 1984 European Championship.

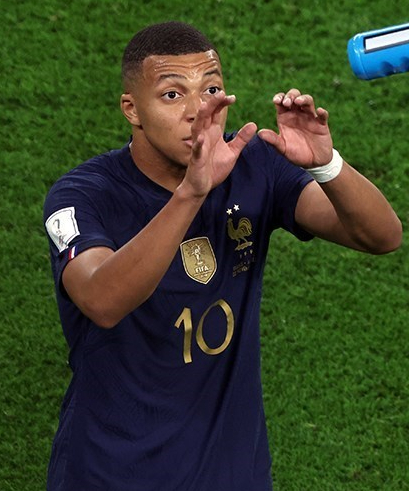
Kylian Mbappé scored a hat-trick in the 2022 FIFA World Cup final, the second player to do so in a World Cup final.

Date	Goals	Player	Opponent	Venue	Competition	Result^{[a]}	Ref.
17 March 1912	3	Eugène Maës	Italy	Campo Piazza d’Armi, Turin	Friendly	4–3	
20 April 1913	5	Eugène Maës	Luxembourg	Stade de Paris, Saint-Ouen	Friendly	8–0	
27 May 1924	3	Édouard Crut	Latvia	Stade de Paris, Saint-Ouen	1924 Summer Olympics	7–0	
13 June 1926	3	Paul Nicolas	Yugoslavia	Colombes, Paris	Friendly	4–1	
21 February 1928	3	Paul Nicolas	Ireland	Stade Buffalo, Montrouge	Friendly	4–0	
9 June 1932	4	Jean Sécember	Bulgaria	Yunak Stadium, Sofia	Friendly	5–3	
15 April 1934	4	Jean Nicolas	Luxembourg	Stade Municipale, Luxembourg City	1934 FIFA World Cup qualification	6–1	
10 May 1934	3	Jean Nicolas	Netherlands	Olympic Stadium, Amsterdam	Friendly	5–4	
23 November 1947	3	Ernest Vaast	Portugal	Estádio Nacional, Lisbon	Friendly	4–2	
17 December 1953	3	Just Fontaine	Luxembourg	Parc des Princes, Paris	1954 FIFA World Cup qualification	8–1	
11 November 1956	5	Thadée Cisowski	Belgium	Colombes, Paris	1958 FIFA World Cup qualification	6–3	
8 June 1958	3	Just Fontaine	Paraguay	Idrottsparken, Norrköping	1958 FIFA World Cup	7–3	
28 June 1958	4	Just Fontaine	West Germany	Ullevi, Gothenburg	1958 FIFA World Cup	6–3	
11 November 1959	3	Just Fontaine	Portugal	Colombes, Paris	Friendly	5–3	
13 December 1959	3	Just Fontaine	Austria	Colombes, Paris	1960 European Nations' Cup qualifying	5–2	
23 December 1967	3	Charly Loubet	Luxembourg	Parc des Princes, Paris	UEFA Euro 1968 qualifying	3–1	
10 September 1969	3	Hervé Revelli	Norway	Ullevaal Stadion, Oslo	1970 FIFA World Cup qualification	3–1	
7 May 1979	3	Bernard Lacombe	United States	Giants Stadium, East Rutherford	Friendly	6–0	
16 June 1984	3	Michel Platini	Belgium	Stade de la Beaujoire, Nantes	UEFA Euro 1984	5–0	
19 June 1984	3	Michel Platini	Yugoslavia	Stade Geoffroy-Guichard, Saint-Étienne	UEFA Euro 1984	3–2	
30 October 1985	3	Dominique Rocheteau	Luxembourg	Parc des Princes, Paris	1986 FIFA World Cup qualification	6–0	
16 August 2000	3	David Trezeguet	FIFA XI	Stade Vélodrome, Marseille	Friendly	5–1	
2 June 2017	3	Olivier Giroud	Paraguay	Roazhon Park, Rennes	Friendly	5–0	
13 November 2021	4	Kylian Mbappé	Kazakhstan	Parc des Princes, Paris	2022 FIFA World Cup qualification	8–0	
18 December 2022	3	Kylian Mbappé	Argentina	Lusail Stadium, Lusail	2022 FIFA World Cup final	3–3 (2–4 p)	
18 November 2023	3	Kylian Mbappé	Gibraltar	Allianz Riviera, Nice	UEFA Euro 2024 qualifying	14–0	
8 June 2026	3	Michael Olise	Northern Ireland	Stade Pierre-Mauroy, Villeneuve-d'Ascq	Friendly	3–1	
26 June 2026	3	Ousmane Dembélé	Norway	Gillette Stadium, Foxborough	2026 FIFA World Cup	4–1	

== Hat-tricks conceded by France ==
Date	Goals	Player	Opponent	Venue	Competition	Result^{[a]}	Ref.
7 May 1905	3	Pierre Destrebecq	Belgium	Stade du Vivier d'Oie, Brussels	Friendly	0–7	
1 November 1906	7	Stanley Harris	England Amateurs	Parc des Princes, Paris	Friendly	0–15	
1 November 1906	4	Vivian Woodward	England Amateurs	Parc des Princes, Paris	Friendly	0–15	
23 March 1908	6	William Jordan	England Amateurs	Park Royal, London	Friendly	0–12	
23 March 1908	3	Vivian Woodward	England Amateurs	Park Royal, London	Friendly	0–12	
22 October 1908	10	Sophus Nielsen	Denmark	White City Stadium, London	1908 Summer Olympics	1–17	
22 October 1908	4	Vilhelm Wolfhagen	Denmark	White City Stadium, London	1908 Summer Olympics	1–17	
9 May 1909	3	Robert De Veen	Belgium	Stade du Vivier d'Oie, Brussels	Friendly	2–5	
22 May 1909	3	Thomas Porter	England Amateurs	Stade de FGSPF, Gentilly	Friendly	0–11	
3 April 1910	3	Alphonse Six	Belgium	Stade de FGSPF, Gentilly	Friendly	0–4	
16 April 1910	4	Thomas Wilson	England Amateurs	Goldstone Ground, Brighton	Friendly	1–10	
16 April 1910	4	William Steer	England Amateurs	Goldstone Ground, Brighton	Friendly	1–10	
15 May 1910	3	Pietro Lana	Italy	Arena Civica, Milan	Friendly	2–6	
1 January 1911	3	Imre Schlosser	Hungary	Stade Charentonneau, Maisons-Alfort	Friendly	0–3	
30 April 1911	5	Robert De Veen	Belgium	Uccle Stadium, Brussels	Friendly	1–7	
8 February 1914	4	Jean Massard	Luxembourg	Stade Achille Hammerel, Luxembourg City	Friendly	4–5	
31 May 1914	3	Sándor Bodnár	Hungary	Üllői Úti Stadion, Budapest	Friendly	1–5	
18 January 1920	3	Ermanno Aebi	Italy	Velodromo Sempione, Milan	Friendly	4–9	
18 January 1920	3	Guglielmo Brezzi	Italy	Velodromo Sempione, Milan	Friendly	4–9	
31 August 1920	3	Otakar Mazal	Czechoslovakia	Olympic Stadium, Antwerp	1920 Summer Olympics	1–4	
13 November 1921	3	Jan van Gendt	Netherlands	Stade Pershing, Vincennes	Friendly	0–5	
11 June 1922	4	Einar Gundersen	Norway	Gressbanen, Oslo	Friendly	0–7	
12 June 1927	6	József Takács	Hungary	Üllői Úti Stadion, Budapest	Friendly	1–13	
11 March 1928	3	Willy Jäggi	Switzerland	Stade Olympique de la Pontaise, Lausanne	Friendly	3–4	
14 April 1929	4	Gaspar Rubio	Spain	Estadio Torrero, Saragossa	Friendly	1–8	
13 April 1930	3	Michel Vanderbauwhede	Belgium	Colombes, Paris	Friendly	1–6	
25 January 1931	3	Giuseppe Meazza	Italy	Stadio Littoriale, Bologna	Friendly	0–5	
29 November 1931	3	Wim Lagendaal	Netherlands	Colombes, Paris	Friendly	3–4	
8 May 1932	3	Neil Dewar	Scotland	Colombes, Paris	Friendly	1–3	
9 June 1932	3	Asen Panchev	Bulgaria	Yunak Stadium, Sofia	Friendly	5–3	
12 January 1936	3	Bep Bakhuys	Netherlands	Parc des Princes, Paris	Friendly	1–6	
6 December 1945	3	Karl Decker	Austria	Prater Stadium, Vienna	Friendly	1–4	
23 April 1949	3	Theo Timmermans	Netherlands	De Kuip, Rotterdam	Friendly	1–4	
19 June 1949	3	Estanislau Basora	Spain	Colombes, Paris	Friendly	1–5	
4 June 1950	3	Joseph Mermans	Belgium	Heysel Stadium, Brussels	Friendly	1–4	
11 November 1953	3	Charles Antenen	Switzerland	Colombes, Paris	Friendly	2–4	
24 June 1958	3	Pelé	Brazil	Råsunda Stadium, Solna	1958 FIFA World Cup	2–5	
12 October 1960	5	Josef Hügi	Switzerland	St. Jakob-Park, Basle	Friendly	2–6	
28 April 1963	3	Pelé	Brazil	Colombes, Paris	Friendly	2–3	
28 September 1966	4	János Farkas	Hungary	Népstadion, Budapest	Friendly	2–4	
12 March 1969	3	Geoff Hurst	England	Wembley Stadium, London	Friendly	0–5	
18 July 2026	3	Bukayo Saka	England	Hard Rock Stadium, Miami Gardens	2026 FIFA World Cup	4–6	
