= Jette Andersen =

Danish footballer (born 1959)

Personal information
- Date of birth: 8 June 1959 (age 67)
- Position: Midfielder

Senior career*
Years	Team	Apps	(Gls)
1975–	Fortuna Hjørring	348	

International career
1982–1985	Denmark	15	(1)
- * Club domestic league appearances and goals

Jette Andersen (born 8 June 1959) is a Danish chairperson and former footballer who played as a midfielder for A-Liga club Fortuna Hjørring and the Denmark women's national football team. She was part of the team at the 1984 European Competition for Women's Football. Andersen served as the chairman of Fortuna Hjørring from 1990–2019 and is the chairman for the annual Dana Cup. In 2015 she received the Danish Football Association Sølvnål award, given to leaders within the sport, for her work with the club.

== After football ==
Andersen has worked with Fortuna Hjørring's Dana Cup tournament since its inception in 1982. She became the chairman of Fortuna Hjørring in 1990, a position she held for 29 years until 2019, when she resigned to focus solely on her job at Dana Cup.

== Honours ==
Fortuna Hjørring

- A-Liga: Runners-up 1989
