= Inger Arnesson =

Swedish international footballer

Personal information
- Date of birth: 12 April 1953 (age 73)
- Position: Goalkeeper

Youth career
- 1968–1971: Floby IF

Senior career*
Years	Team	Apps	(Gls)
1972	Åsarps IF		
1973–1981	Öxabäcks IF		
1982–1987	Sunnanå SK		

International career
1973–1984	Sweden	12	(0)
- * Club domestic league appearances and goals

Inger Arnesson (born 12 April 1953) is a former Swedish footballer. Arnesson has played for Sunnanå SK, and she was a member of the Swedish national team that won the 1984 European Competition for Women's Football.

== Honours ==
Öxabäcks IF

- Damallsvenskan: 1973, 1975, 1978

Sunnanå SK

- Damallsvenskan: 1982
- Svenska Cupen: 1983

Sweden

- UEFA European Women's Championship: 1984
