= Dana Cup =

Association football tournament in Denmark for youths clubs worldwide

The Dana Cup, one of the world's largest football tournaments, takes place every year in the North Jutland town of Hjørring in Denmark at the end of July. In 2008 there were over 25,000 participants (players, coaches and referees) from all around the world. It is advertised by the organisers as "the world's most international youth soccer tournament" since over the years, they claim it has had the largest number of participating countries of any international football tournament. First held in 1982, the tournament celebrated its 40th anniversary in 2023, hosting 1114 teams from 37 different countries.

== Tournament format ==
The tournament caters to boys and girls teams, organised into age groups ranging from U12 to U19. In the first phase of play, games are played in a round-robin format with groups of 4 or 5 teams. Based on their results in this first phase, teams advance into either the 'A' or 'B' finals brackets where games are played in a knockout format.

== Gallery ==
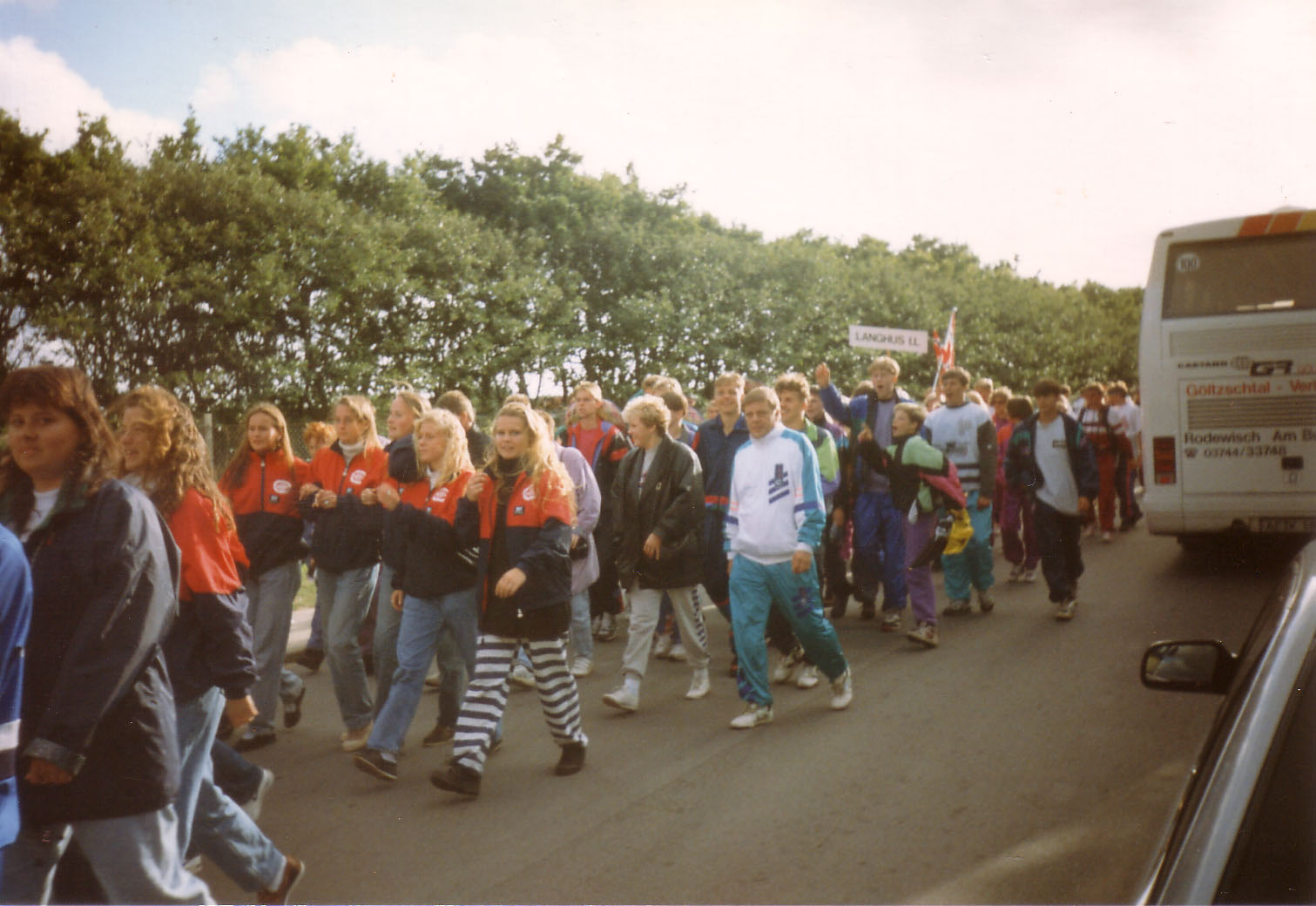
Players moving into the grounds

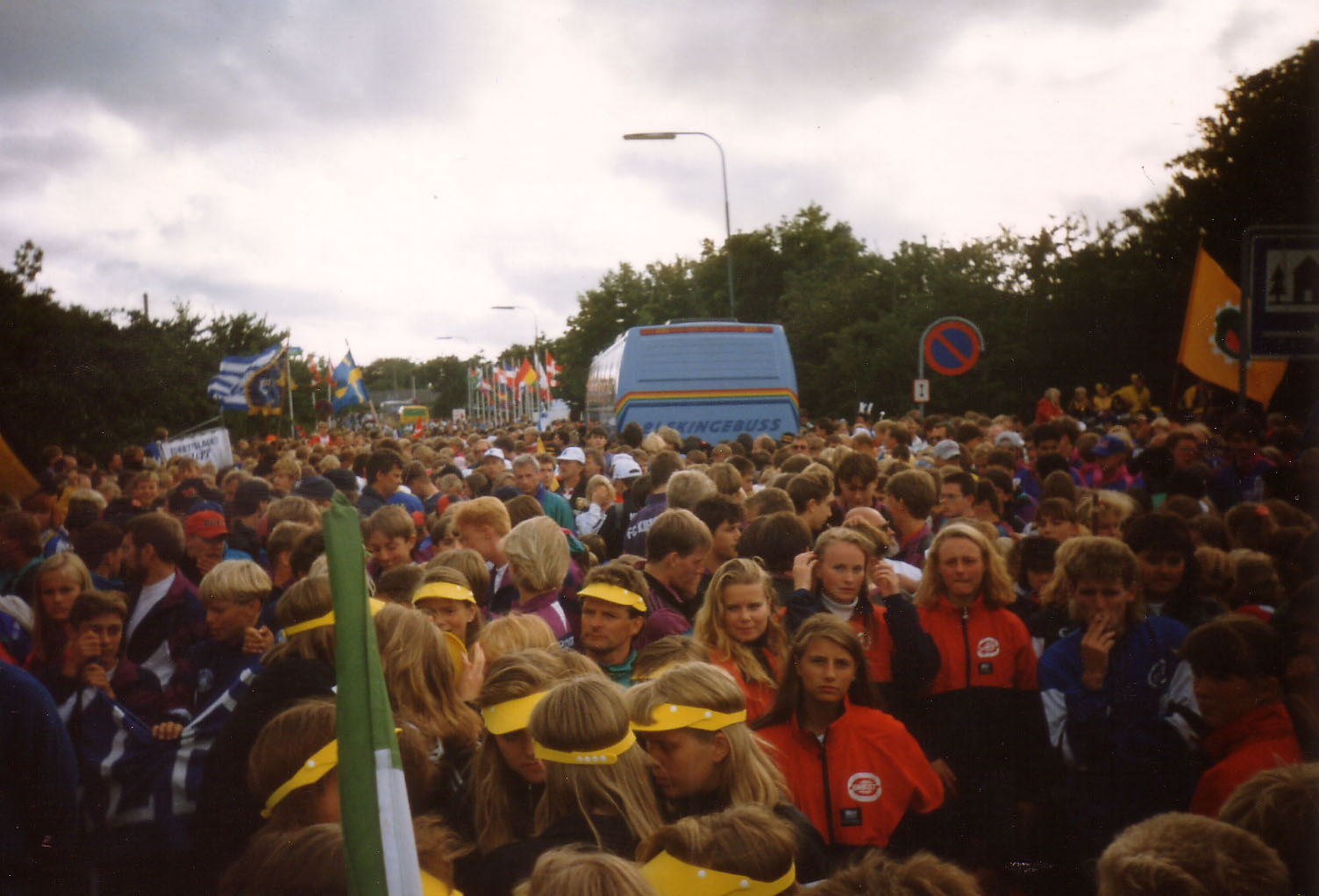
Players arriving off the coaches

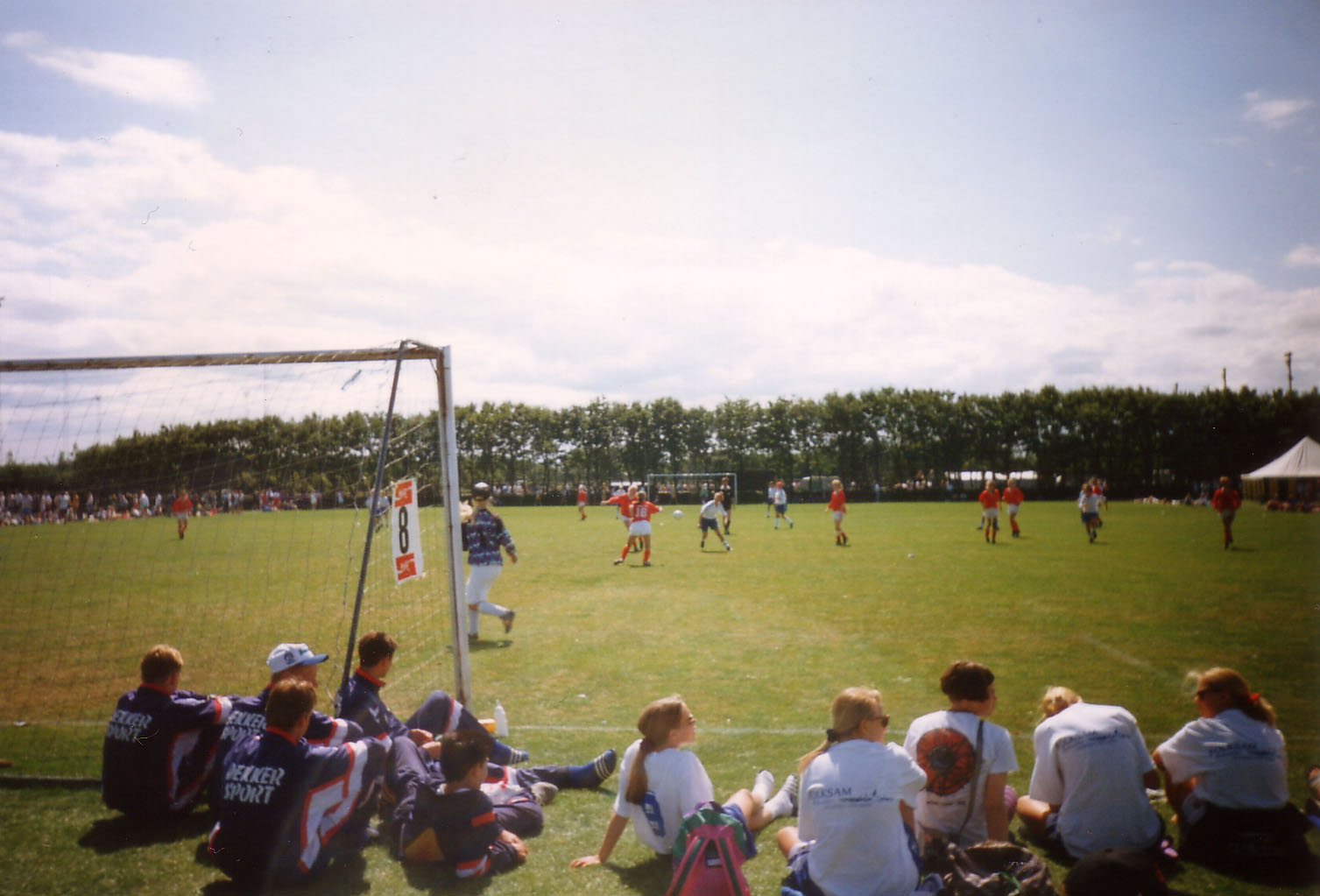
A game taking place

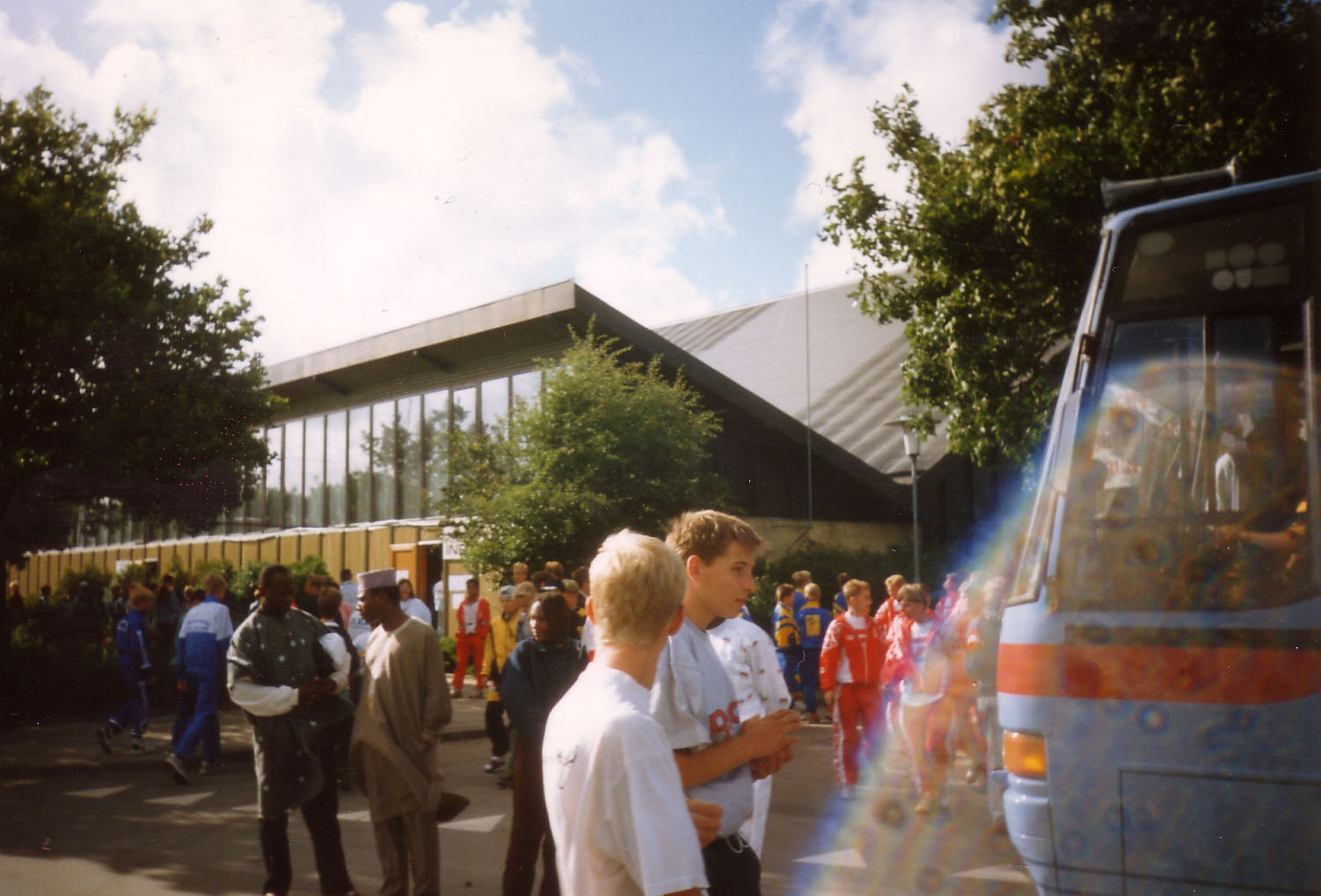
The end of the games
