= Annette Mogensen =

Danish footballer (born 1959)

Personal information
- Date of birth: 26 May 1959 (age 67)
- Position: Defender

Senior career*
Years	Team	Apps	(Gls)
- Kolding B

International career
1980-1988	Denmark	45	(5)
- * Club domestic league appearances and goals

Annette Mogensen (born 26 May 1959) is a Danish footballer who played as a defender for the Denmark women's national football team. She was a part of the team at the 1984 European Competition for Women's Football. At the club level, she played for Kolding Boldklub in Denmark.
