= Camilla Neptune =

Swedish footballer

Personal information
- Full name: Camilla Andersson
- Date of birth: 25 May 1962 (age 64)

International career
Years	Team	Apps	(Gls)
1983-1986	Sweden	23	

Camilla Neptune (born 25 May 1962) is a former Swedish footballer. Neptune was a member of the Swedish national team that won the 1984 European Competition for Women's Football.
