= 1970 FIFA World Cup qualification – UEFA Group 5 =

Football tournament qualification stage

The 1970 FIFA World Cup qualification UEFA Group 5 was a UEFA qualifying group for the 1970 FIFA World Cup. The group comprised France, Norway and Sweden.

== Standings ==
Rank	Team	Pld	W	D	L	GF	GA	GD	Pts
1	Sweden	4	3	0	1	12	5	+7	6
2	France	4	2	0	2	6	4	+2	4
3	Norway	4	1	0	3	4	13	−9	2

== Matches ==
9 October 1968

Sweden	5–0	Norway
Kindvall 38', 58', 61'; B. Larsson 56', 81'	Report

Råsunda Stadium, Stockholm
Referee: Aho (Finland)

6 November 1968

France	0–1	Norway
	Report	Iversen 67'

Stade de la Meinau, Strasbourg
Attendance: 18,319
Referee: Francescon (Italy)

19 June 1969

Norway	2–5	Sweden
Dybwad-Olsen 53', 83'	Report	Persson 21'; L. Eriksson 26'; Kindvall 36'; Grahn 47'; Grip 49'

Ullevaal Stadion, Oslo
Referee: Coiling (Luxembourg)

10 September 1969

Norway	1–3	France
Dybwad-Olsen 90'	Report	Revelli 9', 48', 77'

Ullevaal Stadion, Oslo
Referee: Van Ravens (Netherlands)

15 October 1969

Sweden	2–0	France
Kindvall 32' (pen.), 65'	Report

Råsunda Stadium, Stockholm
Referee: Glöckner (East Germany)

1 November 1969

France	3–0	Sweden
Bras 39', 43'; Djorkaeff 41' (pen.)	Report

Parc des Princes, Paris
Referee: Smith (England)
