= Enzo Benedetti =

Italian footballer and manager (1931-2017)

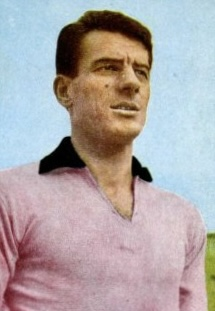
- Benedetti in 1964

Personal information
- Date of birth: 11 June 1931
- Place of birth: Vezzano Ligure
- Date of death: 3 January 2017 (aged 85)
- Place of death: Palermo
- Position: Midfielder

Senior career*
Years	Team	Apps	(Gls)
1951–1952	Spezia	24	(0)
1952–1953	Latina	23	(0)
1953–1955	Chinotto Neri		
1955–1965	Palermo	273	(0)

Managerial career
- 1970–1971: Siracusa
- 1972–1973: Barletta
- 1973–1874: Cosenza
- 1974–1975: Frosinone
- 1976–1977: Albese
- 1978–1979: Mazara
- 1979–1980: Casalotti
- * Club domestic league appearances and goals

Enzo Benedetti (11 June 1931 – 3 January 2017) was an Italian football midfielder and manager.
