= Gitte Hansen =

Danish footballer (born 1961)

Personal information
- Date of birth: 21 September 1961 (age 65)
- Position: Goalkeeper

Senior career*
Years	Team	Apps	(Gls)
- B 1909

International career^{‡}
- Denmark
- * Club domestic league appearances and goals ‡ National team caps and goals as of 16 November 1991 (before the 1991 FIFA Women's World Cup)

Gitte Hansen (born 21 September 1961) is a Danish footballer who played as a goalkeeper for the Denmark women's national football team. She was part of the team at the 1984 European Competition for Women's Football and inaugural 1991 FIFA Women's World Cup. At the club level, she played for B 1909 in Denmark.
