= Viola Langella =

Italian footballer

Personal information
- Date of birth: 14 July 1961 (age 65)
- Place of birth: Rome, Italy
- Height: 1.68 m (5 ft 6 in)
- Position: Centre back

Senior career*
Years	Team	Apps	(Gls)
- ACF Trani 80

International career
	Italy	40	(0)
- * Club domestic league appearances and goals

Viola Langella (born 14 July 1961) is an Italian football manager and player who played as a defender for ACF Trani 80.

== International career ==
Langella was also part of the Italian team at the 1984 European Championships.
