= Elisabetta Secci =

Italian footballer (born 1962)

Personal information
- Date of birth: 10 July 1962 (age 64)
- Position: Centre back

Senior career*
Years	Team	Apps	(Gls)
- Lazio

International career
- Italy
- * Club domestic league appearances and goals

Elisabetta Secci (born 10 July 1962) is an Italian former footballer who played as a defender for Lazio.

== International career ==
Secci was also part of the Italian team at the 1984 European Championships.
