= 1985–86 WFA Cup =

Tournament details
- Country: England & Wales

Final positions
- Champions: Norwich
- Runners-up: Doncaster Belles
- Penalty shoot-outs do not count towards the total number of goals.

The 1985–86 WFA Cup was an association football knockout tournament for women's teams, held between 6 October 1985 and 4 May 1986. It was the 16th season of the WFA Cup and was won by Norwich City, who defeated Doncaster Belles in the final.

The tournament consisted seven rounds of competition proper.

All match results and dates from the Women's FA Cup Website.

== Group A ==
=== First round proper ===
All games were scheduled for 6 October 1985.

Tie	Home team (tier)	Score	Away team (tier)	Att.
1	City Bombers	0–6	BYC Argyle (Burwell Youth Club)	
Bye: Birmingham City, Droitwich St. Andrews, Fodens, Wyvern

=== Second round proper ===
All games were originally scheduled for 3 November 1985.

Tie	Home team (tier)	Score	Away team (tier)	Att.
1	Batchley	4–2	Worcester	
2	Birmingham City	0–2	Fodens	
3	BYC Argyle (Burwell Youth Club)	3–3 (a.e.t.)	Droitwich St. Andrews	
replay	Droitwich St. Andrews	5–1	BYC Argyle (Burwell Youth Club)	
4	Crewe Permanent Way	12–1	Wyvern	

== Group B ==
=== Second round proper ===
All games were originally scheduled for 3 November 1985.

Tie	Home team (tier)	Score	Away team (tier)	Att.
1	Basildon	0–14	Islington	
2	Chelsea	4–4 (a.e.t.)	Tottenham	
replay	Tottenham	3–1	Chelsea	
3	District Line	3–0	Vicarage Wanderers	
4	Northwood	2–11	Spurs	

== Group C ==
=== First round proper ===
All games were scheduled for 6 October 1985.

Tie	Home team (tier)	Score	Away team (tier)	Att.
1	Hemel Hempstead	3–0	Ipswich	
2	Leicester	0–14	Norwich	
3	Suffolk Bluebirds	4–3	Duston Two Tones	
Bye: Attleborough, Biggleswade, Dunstable, EMGALS, Town & County

=== Second round proper ===
All games were originally scheduled for 3 November 1985.

Tie	Home team (tier)	Score	Away team (tier)	Att.
1	Attleborough	3–1	Dunstable	
2	EMGALS	0–5	Biggleswade	
3	Hemel Hempstead	0–1	Norwich	
4	Town & County	12–1	Suffolk Bluebirds	

== Group D ==
=== First round proper ===
All games were scheduled for 6 October 1985.

Tie	Home team (tier)	Score	Away team (tier)	Att.
1	Illogan	18–0	Bridge Youth Club	
2	Pelynt	2–7	Tiverton	
3	Plymouth Pilgrims	2–2 (a.e.t.)	Keynsham	
replay	Keynsham	1–0	Plymouth Pilgrims	
Bye: Bournemouth, Cardiff, Exeter, Exeter Rangers, Frome

=== Second round proper ===
All games were originally scheduled for 3 November 1985.

Tie	Home team (tier)	Score	Away team (tier)	Att.
1	Bournemouth	3–7	Frome	
2	Exeter	6–1	Exeter Rangers	
3	Illogan	2–1	Tiverton	
4	Keynsham	5–3	Cardiff	

== Group E ==
=== First round proper ===
All games were scheduled for 6 October 1985.

Tie	Home team (tier)	Score	Away team (tier)	Att.
1	Doncaster Belles	H–W	CP Doncaster	
Walkover for Doncaster Belles
Bye: BAC Warton, Boots Athletic, Notts Rangers, Rotherham, Sheffield

=== Second round proper ===
All games were originally scheduled for 3 November 1985.

Tie	Home team (tier)	Score	Away team (tier)	Att.
1	Haddon Park	2–1	Boots Athletic	
2	Notts Rangers	2–6	Doncaster Belles	
3	Sheffield	6–1	BAC Warton	
4	St Helens	3–1	Rainworth Miners Welfare	

== Group F ==
=== First round proper ===
All games were scheduled for 6 October 1985.

Tie	Home team (tier)	Score	Away team (tier)	Att.
1	Milton Keynes	1–4	Millwall Lionesses	
Bye: Friends of Fulham, Hightown, Newbury, Southampton

=== Second round proper ===
All games were originally scheduled for 3 November 1985.

Tie	Home team (tier)	Score	Away team (tier)	Att.
1	Aylesbury	12–1	Hightown	
2	Millwall Lionesses	5–0	Southampton	
3	Newbury	1–2	Swindon Spitfires	
4	Solent	0–1	Friends of Fulham	

== Group G ==
=== Second round proper ===
All games were originally scheduled for 3 November 1985.

Tie	Home team (tier)	Score	Away team (tier)	Att.
1	Bronte	6–1	Rotherham	
2	Cleveland Spartans	1–2	Preston Rangers	
3	Rowntrees	16–1	Ingol Belles	
4	Whitley Bay	1–2	Kirkby Sports Centre	

== Group H ==
=== Second round proper ===
All games were originally scheduled for 3 November 1985.

Tie	Home team (tier)	Score	Away team (tier)	Att.
1	Ashford Town	2–2 (a.e.t.)	Reigate	
replay	Reigate	1–1 (?–? p)	Ashford Town	
2	Cove Krakatoa	4–3	C&C Sports	
3	Eastbourne	1–6	Shoreham	
4	Hassocks Beacon	0–3	Southwick	

== Third round proper ==
All games were originally scheduled for 1 December 1985.

Tie	Home team (tier)	Score	Away team (tier)	Att.
1	Ashford Town	?–?	Sheffield	
2	Aylesbury	2–1	Friends of Fulham	
3	Batchley	?–?	Biggleswade	
4	Cove Krakatoa	0–3	Norwich	
5	District Line	?–?	Keynsham	
6	Doncaster Belles	7–0	Droitwich St. Andrews	
7	Fodens	?–?	Tottenham	
Winner not known
8	Frome	?–?	Shoreham	
Winner not known
9	Islington	?–?	Bronte	
10	Kirkby Sports Centre	?–?	Swindon Spitfires	
11	Preston Rangers	5–0	Illogan	
12	Rowntree	?–?	Haddon Park	
13	Southwick	1–0 (a.e.t.)	Exeter	
14	Spurs	?–?	Attleborough	
15	St Helens	?–?	Crewe Permanent Way	
16	Town & County	0–4	Millwall Lionesses	

== Fourth round proper ==
All games were originally scheduled for 5 and 12 January 1986.

Tie	Home team (tier)	Score	Away team (tier)	Att.
1	Aylesbury	2–0	Rowntree	
2	Bronte	4–3 (a.e.t.)	Preston Rangers	
3	Doncaster Belles	3–1	Biggleswade	
4	Fodens	1–4	Millwall Lionesses	
5	Kirkby Sports Centre	2–4	Norwich	
6	Southwick	0–3	St Helens	
Keynsham progressed. Opposition not known.
Spurs progressed. Opposition not known.

== Quarter–finals ==
All games were played on 2 and 9 February 1986.

Tie	Home team (tier)	Score	Away team (tier)	Att.
1	Aylesbury	3–2 (a.e.t.)	Bronte	
2	Doncaster Belles	4–0	Keynsham	
3	Millwall Lionesses	6–1	St Helens	
4	Norwich	12–0	Spurs	

== Semi–finals ==
All games were played on 16 and 23 March 1986.

Tie	Home team (tier)	Score	Away team (tier)	Att.
1	Aylesbury	0–1	Norwich	
2	Millwall Lionesses	1–2	Doncaster Belles	

== Final ==
4 May 1986
14:00 BST

Norwich	4–3	Doncaster Belles
Curl 16'; Colk 40'; Jackson 50'; Lawrence 80+2'	Report	Hanson 26'; Walker 27', 75'

Carrow Road, Norwich
Referee: Ian J Borrett (Harleston)
