= 1981–82 WFA Cup =

Tournament details
- Country: England & Wales

Final positions
- Champions: Lowestoft
- Runners-up: Cleveland Spartans
- Penalty shoot-outs do not count towards the total number of goals.

The 1981–82 WFA Cup was an association football knockout tournament for women's teams, held between 4 October 1981 and 1 May 1982. It was the 12th season of the WFA Cup and was won by Lowestoft, who defeated Cleveland Spartans in the final.

The tournament consisted seven rounds of competition proper.

All match results and dates from the Women's FA Cup Website.

== First round proper ==
All games were scheduled for 4 and 11 October 1981.

Tie	Home team (tier)	Score	Away team (tier)	Att.
1	Amersham Angels	1–2	Shelburne	
2	Biggleswade United	6–0	Millwall Lionesses	
3	Burton Wanderers	0–4	Birmingham City	
4	Colchester	1–4	Lowestoft	
5	Durrington Rebels	4–2	Hassocks Beacon	
6	Friends of Fulham	9–0	Watford	
7	Horsham	?–?	Worthing	
8	Manchester Corinthians	2–3	Preston Rangers	
9	Manchester United Supporters	1–4	Daresbury	
10	Rossendale	0–7	Doncaster Belles	
11	Rotherham	7–2	Rochdale	
12	Spurs	?–?	Ashford Town	
13	Worthing	0–0 (a.e.t.)	Bracknell	
replay	Bracknell	0–2	Worthing	
14	Wythenshawe	3–8	CP Doncaster	
Bye: Cleveland Spartans, Exeter

== Second round proper ==
All games were originally scheduled for 1 November 1981.

Tie	Home team (tier)	Score	Away team (tier)	Att.
1	Broadoak	1–4	Doncaster Belles	
2	Crewe	3–1	Wolverhampton	
3	Daresbury	0–4	Preston North End	
4	Exeter	10–0	Chard	
5	Friends of Fulham	6–1	Biggleswade United	
6	Illogan	2–5	Tiverton	
7	Kilnhurst	1–4	Cleveland Spartans	
8	Lowestoft	7–0	Suffolk Bluebirds	
9	Manor Athletic	1–5	Fodens	
10	Pelynt	2–0	Kingsteignton	
11	Southampton	1–3	Cleveland Spartans	
12	St Catherines	3–1	Plymouth Pilgrims	

== Third round proper ==
All games were originally scheduled for 6 December 1981.

Tie	Home team (tier)	Score	Away team (tier)	Att.
1	Cleveland Spartans	5–2	Fodens	
2	Crewe	1–1 (a.e.t.)	BYC Argyle (Burwell Youth Club)	
replay	BYC Argyle (Burwell Youth Club)	2–0	Crewe	
3	Friends of Fulham	9–3	Costessey	
4	Old Actonians	0–2	Lowestoft	
5	Pelynt	4–2	Exeter	
6	Rotherham	1–4	Doncaster Belles	
7	Solihull	?–? (a.e.t.)	Notts Rangers	
replay	Notts Rangers	2–1	Solihull	

== Fourth round proper ==
All games were originally scheduled for 24 and 31 January 1982.

Tie	Home team (tier)	Score	Away team (tier)	Att.
1	Aylesbury	0–1	Cleveland Spartans	
2	BYC Argyle (Burwell Youth Club)	2–0	Worthing	
3	Friends of Fulham	0–0 (a.e.t.)	Doncaster Belles	
replay	Doncaster Belles	6–1	Friends of Fulham	
4	Maidstone Mote United	6–1	Luton	
5	Preston North End	1–3	Lowestoft	
6	Southampton	10–0	Pelynt	
7	Spurs	0–7	St Helens	
8	Tiverton	2–0	Notts Rangers	

== Quarter–finals ==
All games were played on 7 February 1982.

Tie	Home team (tier)	Score	Away team (tier)	Att.
1	BYC Argyle (Burwell Youth Club)	0–4	Cleveland Spartans	
2	Doncaster Belles	2–3	Lowestoft	
3	St Helens	1–3	Southampton	
4	Tiverton	?–?	Maidstone Mote United	

== Semi–finals ==
All games were played on 14 and 21 March 1982.

Tie	Home team (tier)	Score	Away team (tier)	Att.
1	Lowestoft	1–0	Maidstone Mote United	
2	Southampton	1–1 (a.e.t.)	Cleveland Spartans	
replay	Cleveland Spartans	2–1	Southampton	

== Final ==
1 May 1982
12:30 BST

Lowestoft	2–0	Cleveland Spartans
Curl 26'; Poppy 57'	Report

Loftus Road, London
Attendance: 1,000
Referee: D.S. Vickers (Ilford)
