= Norwich City Women F.C. =

Women's football club affiliated with Norwich City FC

Norwich City Women
- Full name: Norwich City Women Football Club
- Nicknames: The Canaries; Yellows
- Founded: 1982
- Ground: The Nest, Horsford
- Capacity: 1,000
- Manager: Perry Northeast
- League: FA Women's National League North
- 2025–26: FA Women's National League Division One South East, 2nd of 12 (promoted via play-offs)
- Website: https://www.canaries.co.uk
Home colours

Norwich City Women is the women's football club affiliated to Norwich City F.C. Previously operated by a board of volunteers, Norwich City F.C. formally integrated the women's side into the club in February 2022. The club achieved promotion at the end of the 2025–26 season, and will play in the third tier in the 2026–27 season, in the FA Women's National League North.

Founded in 1982, the original Norwich Ladies team won the Women's FA Cup in 1986 under manager Maureen Martin before disbanding in 1987. The 1990s saw new team Canary Racers achieve four consecutive first place finishes in the Eastern Region Women's Football League Premier Division, before they joined the South East Combination Women's Football League in 1998. They started competing as Norwich City in 2001. The current Norwich City Women have won the Norfolk County Cup eight times. They play their home games at The Nest but occasionally play home fixtures at Carrow Road.

== History 1982–87: Origins and WFA Cup Glory ==
The original Norwich Women's team was founded in 1982 by Maureen Martin (nee Reynolds) who assembled a team of youth players she had been coaching whom she nicknamed 'the fledgelings'. She also signed England players Linda Curl, Jackie Slack and Vicky Johnson from Lowestoft Ladies who had disbanded. They competed in the East Anglian League for their first season before transferring to the Chiltern League. The club dominated both of these leagues until 1987 and also reached the WFA Cup semi-final in 1985. In September 1983 Norwich beat Milton Keynes Reserves 40-0 with Curl scoring 22 times in the Chiltern League Division Two fixture. They won the Chiltern League Division One in 1984–85, 1985–86 and 1986–87. In the 1985–86 season, Norwich progressed to the final of the WFA Cup after defeating Spurs 12–0 in the quarter-finals and Aylesbury 1–0 in the semi-finals.

On 4 May 1986, they won the 1986 WFA Cup final against Doncaster Rovers Belles at Carrow Road. Norwich won the match 4–3 under manager Maureen Martin, with Curl opening the scoring. Miranda Colk and Sallie Jackson also scored as the lead changed hands. With the scores level at 3–3, Marianne Lawrence scored a late winner to secure the trophy. At the end of the 1986/87 season, Martin stood down and as no replacement could be found the original club disbanded.

== 1989–2001: Canary Racers - Norwich City ==
Canary Rangers competed in the Women's FA Cup in the 1989–90 and 1991–92 seasons but failed to make it past the third round. Under the name Canary Racers, their best run in the tournament came in the 1995–96 season when they reached the fifth round. In January 1998, they hosted Arsenal Women in the fourth round but lost 12–0 to a team featuring Rachel Yankey at the Canary Racers home ground in Attleborough.

They also competed in the Eastern Region Women's Football League Premier Division which they won four times during the 1990s, in 1994–95, 1995–96, 1996–97 and again in 1997–98. They then joined the South East Combination Women's Football League for the 1998-99 season where they finished fourth and then finished in the same position again the following season. 2000–01 is the final season where they are named Canary Racers with the team changing to Norwich City for the 2001-02 season, although records for the Women's FA Cup show them competing under the name Norwich City Racers in that same season. Prominent players for the Canary Racers included Vanessa Kemp who was a member of the Norwich side that won the 1986 WFA Cup and was capped by England and received legacy cap number 86.

== 2001–2022 ==
In 2001–02 they competed as Norwich City in the South East Combination Women's Football League finishing fourth. In 2002–03 they finished sixth and in 2003–04 they were fourth. A fifth-place finish was achieved in 2004–05, but they dropped down to eighth at the end of the 2005–06 season.

In the final season of the South East Combination Women's Football League in 2013–2014, Norwich finished third. The summer of 2014 saw the women's leagues restructured and Norwich joined the inaugural FAWPL (now FAWNL) in the fourth tier.

Norwich City Women won the inaugural Norfolk County Cup in the 2010–11 season and successfully defended it three times to win four in a row. Norwich would have to wait another seven years before they would win it again, a timespan that included a last-16 3–2 defeat to Acle United Ladies in the 2018–19 season. In May 2020, Shaun Howes was unveiled as the new head coach, and he won a trophy in his first season in charge. Kathryn Stanley scored a hat-trick in the final of the 2020–21 County Cup as Norwich beat Mulbarton 7–0 at The FDC in Bowthorpe. This season also saw the club leave their ground at Plantation Park, Blofield and move to their new ground The Nest.

== 2022–present: Integration with Norwich City F.C ==
In February 2022, it was announced that Norwich City Women had been fully integrated into Norwich City F.C who were now responsible for all day to day running of the club. On the pitch, the 2021/22 season finished on a positive note with the club surviving a relegation battle. After only collecting seven points before Christmas, an upturn in form saw them retain their fourth-tier status. Norwich City appointed former footballer Flo Allen as general manager of the women's side in June 2022.

On 16 April 2023, Norwich City Women played their first match at Carrow Road since their integration into Norwich City F.C, running out 5–3 winners against Ashford Town in an FA Women's National League Division One South East Fixture. The match was played in front of a crowd of 7,585 spectators with Alice Parker scoring twice. In May, they won the 2022–23 Norfolk County Cup by defeating Mulbarton Wanderers 3–0 in the final. It was head coach Shaun Howes's final game in charge and concluded a campaign where Norwich achieved their highest league finish for 9 years.

In February 2024, it was announced that head coach Martin Herdman had departed the club. Under interim head coach Scott Emmerson, Norwich City Women won the Norfolk County Cup in the 2023–24 season. After beating Mulbarton Wanderers 7–0 in the semi-final, they beat Wroxham Ladies 6–0 in the final held at Carrow Road, with forward Natasha Snelling scoring twice. Norwich finished second in the league and therefore missed out on promotion to AFC Wimbledon. Norwich were unbeaten in the league until the final game of the season when they lost to Ashford Town. Midfielder Ellie Smith was voted fans player of the season for the second consecutive year.

In June 2024, it was announced that Andy Cook had been appointed as the new head coach, commencing duties on 1 July. For the second consecutive season, Norwich finished second in the league and therefore missed out on promotion, this time to Real Bedford Ladies . Natasha Snelling was named player of the season for 2024–25. Norwich finished the season by clinching the County Cup for the third consecutive year, beating Mulbarton 7–1. Captain Megan Todd scored in her final game before retiring from football.

In May 2025, Norwich announced that they would start offering professional contracts to some players, and the following month Ellie Bishop became the first player to sign a professional contract with the club.

On 3 May 2026, Norwich secured promotion to the third tier of English football following a playoff victory against Moneyfields F.C. Held at the Pirelli Stadium, Burton, Norwich led 2–0 but the game finished level and the match went to a penalty shootout. Norwich won 6–5 after Sarah Quantrill saved the final penalty. Two days later, Norwich announced that they had parted company with head coach Cook. Grace Riglar was named as both the Supporters and Players' Player of the Season.

It was announced that Norwich would join the FAWNL Northern Premier Division for the following season. On 19 June 2026, the club announced that Perry Northeast would be the new head coach, commencing duties on 1 July.

== Long-term vision ==
In March 2024, it was revealed that Norwich City Women would receive over £200k after Mark Attanasio bought shares in the parent club with his Norfolk Holdings Group and that this would help with the "longer term vision" of the club. Executive Director Zoe Webber said: "It will help form part of our strategic plan as we continue to build on the recent success and infrastructure around our women's team." Norwich City Community Sports Foundation (CSF) have a Girls Football Development Pathway from under 8's to under 16's that aims to help young players fulfill their potential, with the Norwich City Women first team at the end of the pathway.

== Ground ==
Norwich City Women play their home matches at the Community Sports Foundation's The Nest which is named after the former ground of Norwich City FC. The Nest is also a community hub and in 2024, Lioness Lauren Hemp, originally from North Walsham, opened a new 3G pitch at the site which is named after her. Prior to playing at The Nest, they played at Plantation Park, Blofield, also the home of Norwich United F.C. Since they became integrated into Norwich City F.C, the women's team have played several league games at Carrow Road, including a match in the 2022–23 season against Ashford Town and two fixtures during the 2023–24 season against QPR and Cambridge United. Manager Andy Cook said in October 2024 that it would be "huge to play there more often".

== Players ==
=== First-team squad ===
As of 15 August 2026

Note: Flags indicate national team as defined under FIFA eligibility rules; some limited exceptions apply. Players may hold more than one non-FIFA nationality.

No.	Pos.	Nation	Player
1	GK	ENG	Poppy Irvine
2	DF	ENG	Grace Riglar
3	DF	NIR	Natalie Johnson
4	MF	ENG	Eloise King
6	DF	ENG	Evie Williams
7	FW	ENG	Eloise Hall
8	MF	ENG	Millie Daviss
9	MF	ENG	Ellie Smith
10	FW	ENG	Elliana Martin
11	MF	ENG	Holly Kennard
12	MF	ENG	Bryony Brodie (on loan)
13	GK	USA	Eva Jean-Young
14	FW	ENG	Faith Harrison
15	MF	ENG	Poppy Groves
16	DF	ENG	Emily Wallace
17	MF	ENG	Lara Densley

No.	Pos.	Nation	Player
18	MF	ENG	Freya Symonds
19	MF	ENG	Lauren Hailes
20	MF	ENG	Isabelle Moore
21	GK	ENG	Amber Locker
22	DF	ENG	Poppy Francis
23	DF		Zofia Szczech
24	MF	ENG	Drew Wilson
25	FW	ENG	Niyah Dunbar (on loan from Sunderland A.F.C. Women)
26	MF	ENG	Sienna Booty
27	GK	ENG	Megan Frary
28	GK	ENG	Abi Calver

== Club Staff ==
Head of Women's Football	Flo Allen
Head Coach	Perry Northeast
Assistant Coach	Megan Todd
Goalkeeping Coach	Hugh McCluskie
Sports Therapist	Robyn Joseph
Physical Performance Coach	William Davies

== Honours ==
=== Norwich ===
- Women's FA Cup
  - Winners (1): 1985–86
- East Anglian League
  - Winners (1): 1982–83
- Chiltern League 1st Division
  - Winners (3): 1984–85, 1985–86, 1986–87
- Chiltern League 2nd Division
  - Winners (1): 1983–84
- Chiltern League Cup
  - Winners (4): 1983–84, 1984–85, 1985–86, 1986–87

=== Canary Racers ===
- Eastern Region Women's Football League Premier Division
  - Winners (4) 1994–95, 1995–96, 1996–97, 1997–98

=== Norwich City ===
- Eastern Region Women's Football League Premier Division
  - Winners (1) 2007–08
- Norfolk Women's Cup
  - Winners (8): 2010–11, 2011–12, 2012–13, 2013–14, 2020–21, 2022–23, 2023–24, 2024–25
- FA Women's National League Division One
  - Play-off winners (1) 2025–26
