= Karin Åhman-Svensson =

Swedish international footballer

Personal information
- Date of birth: 30 March 1957 (age 69)

International career
Years	Team	Apps	(Gls)
	Sweden	54	(2)

Karin Åhman-Svensson (born 30 March 1957) is a former Swedish footballer. Åhman-Svensson was a member of the Swedish national team that won the 1984 European Competition for Women's Football.
