= Angelica Burevik =

Swedish footballer (born 1958)

Personal information
- Full name: Angelica Burevik Törnqvist
- Date of birth: December 7, 1958 (age 67)
- Place of birth: Helsingborg, Sweden
- Position: Defender

Senior career*
Years	Team	Apps	(Gls)
- Stattena IF

International career^{‡}
1981–1985	Sweden	30	(0)
- * Club domestic league appearances and goals ‡ National team caps and goals as of October 18, 2007

Angelica Burevik Törnqvist (born 7 December 1958) is a Swedish former association football defender who won 30 caps for the Sweden women's national football team. She is nicknamed Agge.

== Club career ==
Burevik's performances for local team Stattena IF earned her a place in the Helsingborgs Idrottsmuseum Hall of Fame in 1983. She later served the club as chairperson.

== International career ==
Burevik made her senior Sweden debut in a 6–1 win over France in Montauban on 23 May 1981. She won the first UEFA championships for national women's teams in 1984. Sweden beat England in the final, on a penalty shootout at Kenilworth Road after a 1–1 aggregate draw. Burevik's break down the right wing and cross had created Pia Sundhage's headed goal for Sweden in the first leg at Ullevi. Her exertions in central defence on the muddy Kenilworth Road pitch left her too exhausted to participate in the shootout.

Burevik played 30 games in a row for Sweden, the last of which was on 9 October 1985. Only two games were lost while 22 resulted in Swedish victories.
