= Doris Uusitalo =

Swedish international footballer

Personal information
- Full name: Doris Katarina Uusitalo
- Date of birth: 17 October 1957 (age 69)
- Place of birth: Jarhois, Sweden

Senior career*
Years	Team	Apps	(Gls)
1978–1981	Jar-Ka IF		
1982–1987	Hammarby IF		
- Öxabäcks IF

International career
1983-1986	Sweden	18	(3)
- * Club domestic league appearances and goals

Doris Katarina Uusitalo (born 17 October 1957), is a former Swedish footballer. Uusitalo was a member of the Swedish national team that won the 1984 European Competition for Women's Football. After a cruciate ligament injury in 1987, Uusitalo was forced to retire from football. In 1985, Uusitalo won a Stora Grabbars och Tjejers Märke.
