= Anna Svenjeby =

Swedish footballer

Personal information
- Full name: Anna Svenjeby
- Date of birth: 9 December 1962 (age 63)
- Position: Midfielder

Senior career*
Years	Team	Apps	(Gls)
- Kronängs IF
- Jitex BK

International career^{‡}
1979–1987	Sweden	58	(6)
- * Club domestic league appearances and goals as of 15:36, 7 April 2018 (UTC) ‡ National team caps and goals as of 15:36, 7 April 2018 (UTC)

Anna Svenjeby (born 26 April 1962) is a Swedish retired football player who played as a midfielder for Kronängs IF and Jitex BK in the Swedish Championship in the late 1970s and 1980s. She won the first edition of the Årets Fotbollstjej Award, the forerunner of the Diamantbollen, in 1980, and she was a member of the Swedish national team that won the 1984 European Championship.

== Club career ==
While playing for Kronängs IF in 1980, aged 18, Svenjeby won the Årets Fotbollstjej award for the best female footballer in Sweden. In 1984 she helped Jitex BK win a league and cup double.

== International career ==
Svenjeby made her senior international debut as a 17-year-old on 5 July 1979, a 4–1 win over Denmark played in Fredrikstad, Norway. Her national team career comprised the next 57 consecutive international matches, during which she scored six goals.

== Personal life ==
Anna's daughter Malin is also a footballer. Malin played once for the Sweden Under–16 team and overcame serious injury to play for Dalsjöfors GoIF in the Damallsvenskan.
