= Mia Kåberg =

Swedish international footballer (born 1958)

Personal information
- Date of birth: 9 June 1958 (age 68)
- Position: Defender

International career
Years	Team	Apps	(Gls)
- Sweden

Mia Kåberg (born 9 June 1958) is a former Swedish footballer. Kåberg was a member of the Swedish national team that won the 1984 European Competition for Women's Football. Kåberg joined AIK in 1978, and in 1981 was the first women's player from AIK to reperesent the Swedish women's national football team.
