= Ulf Lyfors =

Swedish football manager (1943–2022)

Personal information
- Date of birth: 9 July 1943
- Date of death: 20 February 2022 (aged 78)

Senior career*
Years	Team	Apps	(Gls)
- Huvudsta IS

Managerial career
- 1979–1980: Djurgården (women)
- 1980–1987: Sweden (women)
- 1991: Sweden U20
- 2005–2006: IK Frej
- * Club domestic league appearances and goals

Ulf Lyfors (9 July 1943 – 20 February 2022) was a Swedish football player and coach.

== Career ==
Lyfors played for Huvudsta IS.

Lyfors managed Djurgården's women's team in the 1979 and 1980 seasons. From 1980 to 1987, he was the coach of the Sweden women's national team, in that time winning the UEFA Women's Championship once, in 1984.

Lyfors can be seen in the 2013 Sveriges Television documentary television series The Other Sport.

== Personal life ==
Lyfors was married to coach and former player Marika Domanski-Lyfors and had one child.
