= Linda Curl =

English association football player

Personal information
- Date of birth: 1961 or 1962 (age 64–65)
- Place of birth: Norwich, England
- Positions: Midfielder; forward

Senior career*
Years	Team	Apps	(Gls)
- Lowestoft Ladies
- Norwich
- Town & County L.F.C.
- Ipswich Town

International career^{‡}
1977–1990	England	62	(27)
- * Club domestic league appearances and goals as of 14:09, 20 February 2021 (UTC) ‡ National team caps and goals as of 14:09, 25 October 2024 (UTC)

Linda Curl is an English former footballer who played as a midfielder or forward for the England women's national football team winning 62 caps and scoring 27 goals. At club level she won the WFA Cup with Lowestoft Ladies in 1982 and also with Norwich in 1986, scoring in both finals.

== Club career ==
At Lowestoft Ladies Curl won her first WFA Cup with a 2-0 victory over Cleveland Spartans at Loftus Road. She scored the opening goal for the team known as The Waves. Curl was signed by Norwich manager Maureen Martin (nee Reynolds), who was a former team-mate of Curl's in the 1979 WFA Cup final which Lowestoft Ladies lost 1-0 to Southampton WFC. Whilst at Norwich, Curl scored 22 of the goals in a 40-0 win versus Milton Keynes Reserves in the Chiltern League Division Two in September 1983. She also scored the opening goal at Carrow Road in the 1986 WFA Cup final which saw Norwich beat Doncaster Rovers Belles 4-3 for her second win in the tournament.

== International career ==
Curl made her England debut as a 15-year-old, in a 9–1 friendly win over Switzerland, staged at Boothferry Park, Hull, on 28 April 1977. In the 1984 European Competition for Women's Football final, England lost the first away leg 1–0 against Sweden, after a header from Pia Sundhage. They won the second home leg by the same margin, with a goal from Curl. England lost the subsequent penalty shootout 4–3, as both Curl and Lorraine Hanson had their spot kicks saved by Elisabeth Leidinge. At the 1988 Mundialito Curl finished the tournament as overall top scorer with four goals. She continued playing for England until 1990 when she retired.

In November 2022, Curl was recognized by The Football Association as one of the England national team's legacy players, and as the 35th women's player to be capped by England.

Outside of football she worked as a police officer.

== Honours ==
=== Club ===
Lowestoft

- FA Women's Cup: 1981–82

Norwich

- FA Women's Cup: 1985–86
