= List of England women's international footballers =

This is a list of England women's international footballers – association football players who have played for the England women's national football team. This table takes into account all official England matches.

Legacy numbers were introduced in November 2022 to mark the 50th anniversary of an official England women's team.

== Key ==
	Tournament medalists at the: 1984 EC — 1984 Euros - (silver) Runners-up; 2009 EC — 2009 Euros - (silver) Runners-up; 2015 WC — 2015 FIFA World Cup - (bronze) Third; 2017 EC — 2017 Euros - (bronze) Third; 2022 EC — 2022 Euros - (gold) Winners; 2025 EC — 2025 Euros - (gold) Winners; 2023 WC — 2023 FIFA World Cup - (silver) Runners-up
**Bold**	Currently available for selection. Correct as of 13 October 2026 against Greece.
Pos	Positions
GK	Goalkeeper
DF	Defender
MF	Midfielder
FW	Forward

== Table ==
England women's national team football players
Legacy number	Player	Date of birth	Caps	Goals	Debut		Last or most recent match		Ref.
Legacy number	Player	Date of birth	Caps	Goals	Date	Opponent	Date	Opponent	Ref.
1	Sue Buckett	1 January 1944	29	0	18 November 1972	Scotland			
2	Morag Pearce (née Kirkland)		41	0	18 November 1972	Scotland			
3	Sandra Graham		1	0	18 November 1972	Scotland			
4	Janet Bagguley		11	0	18 November 1972	Scotland			
5	Sheila Parker	1947	33	5	18 November 1972	Scotland			
6	Margaret McGroarty		6	5	18 November 1972	Scotland			
7	Lynda Hale	23 February 1954	10	3	18 November 1972	Scotland			
8	Sylvia Gore	25 November 1944	5	2	18 November 1972	Scotland			
9	Pat Davies		8	8	18 November 1972	Scotland			
10	Jeannie Allott		11	1	18 November 1972	Scotland			
11	Jean Wilson		1	0	18 November 1972	Scotland			
12	Wendy Owen	1954	16	0	18 November 1972	Scotland	26 February 1977	France	
13	Julia Manning		4	1	22 April 1973	France			
14	Eileen Foreman		16	10					
15	Margaret Miks		8	0					
16	Pat Firth		12	9	23 June 1973	Scotland			
17	Sue Whyatt	16 August 1954	1	0	23 June 1973	Scotland			
18	Sue Lopez	1 September 1945	22	6					
19	Lesley Stirling		5	1					
20	Sandra Choat		5	4					
21	Liz Deighan		49	3	7 November 1974	France			
22	Carol Thomas (née McCune)	5 June 1955	56	0	7 November 1974	France	22 September 1985	Republic of Ireland	
23	Lorraine Hanson (née Dobb)		37	2	1975		1986		
24	Pauline May (née Chilton)		1	0	1975		1986		
25	Alison Leatherbarrow		19	0					
26	Elaine Badrock		14	8	15 June 1975	Sweden			
27	Rayner Hadden		7	1					
28	Linda Coffin		28	1					
29	Cathy Bird (née Hamstead)		2	0			19 May 1976	Scotland	
30	Debbie Cowell (née Smith)		3	0					
31	Angela Poppy	19 November 1953	5	1					
32	Audrey Rigby		1	0					
33	Pat Chapman	21 July 1956	32	13	22 May 1976	Wales	1985		
34	Debbie Day	29 March 1959	6	2	5 June 1976	Italy	2 May 1978	Republic of Ireland	
35	Linda Curl	1962	62	27	28 April 1977	Switzerland			
36	Christine Hutchinson		9	1					
37	Josie Clifford (née Lee)		4	0	1975		1986		
38	Janet Milner		1	0					
39	Patricia Cavanagh (née Napier)		1	0					
40	Debbie Bampton	7 October 1961	95	7	30 September 1978	Netherlands	11 May 1997	United States	
41	Eileen Lillyman		6	0					
42	Sarah Pollard	20 April 1956	1	1	19 May 1979	Denmark	19 May 1979	Denmark	
43	Debbie Mack		5	0					
44	Janet Turner		28	4	July 1979	Finland	1985		
45	Theresa Wiseman	1956	68	0	23 July 1979	Switzerland			
46	Sheree Livesey (née Jameson)		1	0					
47	Marrie Wieczorek		3	0	1 May 1980	Belgium	17 September 1980	Sweden	
48	Maureen Reynolds		5	2	1 May 1980	Belgium			
49	Linda Young		1	0					
50	Vicky Johnson		5	1					
51	Tracy Doe		12	5					
52	Terry Springett		2	0					
53	Terri Hinton (née Irvine)		7	0					
54	Mary Rudkin (née Meacham)		1	0					
55	Angela Gallimore		35	5	2 May 1981	Republic of Ireland			
56	Gillian Coultard	22 July 1963	125	19	2 May 1981	Republic of Ireland	13 May 2000	Switzerland	
57	Loraine Smith (née Hunt)		16	0					
58	Julie Hemsley		1	0					
59	Kerry Davis	2 August 1962	90	43	19 September 1982	Northern Ireland	8 March 1998	Germany	
60	Maxine Johnson (née Fowkes)		1	0					
61	Hope Powell	8 December 1966	72	17	11 September 1983	Republic of Ireland	14 May 1998	Norway	
62	Brenda Sempare	30 June 1964	55	5					
63	Jackie Sherrard	9 June 1966	47	5					
64	Jackie Slack	25 July 1959	35	1	August 1984	Belgium	1990	United States	
65	Marieanne Spacey	13 February 1966	94	30	August 1984	Belgium	27 June 2001	Sweden	
66	Sallie Jackson		6	0					
67	Joanne Broadhurst	27 November 1967	28	6	24 August 1984	Italy			
68	Sue Law		39	1	17 August 1985	Wales			
69	Jane Stanley	13 April 1964	27	3	27 April 1986	Republic of Ireland			
70	Lorraine Hoey		3	0					
71	Tracy Davidson	6 January 1961	25	0	29 March 1987	Republic of Ireland	17 April 1994	Slovenia	
72	Karen Walker	29 July 1969	86	41	20 July 1988	Italy	22 May 2003	Canada	
73	Karen Skillcorn		2	0					
74	Carole Osborne		2	0	18 September 1988	Norway	30 April 1989	Scotland	
75	Clare Lambert		26	1					
76	Maria Harper		14	2					
77	Jan Murray	26 October 1966	35	1					
78	Tina Mapes	21 January 1971	19	0					
79	Louise Waller	30 July 1969	32	0	1989		9 June 1997	Norway	
80	Gail Borman	25 April 1963	22	7					
81	Lesley Higgs (née Shipp)	26 October 1968	16	0					
82	Clare Taylor	22 May 1965	32	5	16 December 1990	Germany			
83	Carol Harwood		6	0					
84	Mandy O'Callaghan		3	0					
85	Helen Clancy		3	0					
86	Vanessa Kemp		3	0					
87	Louise Cafferkey		3	0					
88	Sammy Britton	8 February 1973	65	3			22 May 2003	Canada	
89	Samantha Howarth (née Hayward)	1 February 1971	8	0	June 1991	Denmark			
90	Olivia Hughes		2	0					
91	Michelle Jackson	5 June 1968	2	0	25 May 1991	United States			
92	Michelle Curley	30 April 1972	5	0					
93	Julie Tomlinson		1	0					
94	Sarah Begg		2	1					
95	Karen Burke	14 June 1971	72	7					
96	Isobel Pollard		3	0					
97	Sian Williams	2 February 1968	20	0	8 October 1994	Iceland			
98	Frances Carroll		1	0	25 September 1993	Slovenia			
99	Kirsty Pealling	14 April 1975	17	0	6 November 1993	Belgium	14 May 2004	Iceland	
100	Mandy Lowe	1 January 1970	1	0					
101	Donna Smith	17 January 1967	3	0	8 October 1994	Iceland			
102	Julie Fletcher	28 September 1974	26	0	13 May 1995	Sweden			
103	Karen Farley	2 September 1970	11	8					
104	Becky Easton	16 April 1974	44	0					
105	Chantel Woodhead	17 September 1974	1	0	25 January 1995	Italy	25 January 1995	Italy	
106	Pauline Cope	16 February 1969	60	0	26 January 1995	Italy	19 February 2004	Denmark	
107	Alex Cottier	6 December 1977	5	0					
108	Kelly Smith	29 October 1978	117	46	1 November 1995	Italy	8 May 2014	Ukraine	
109	Mo Marley	31 January 1967	41	1	1 November 1995	Italy	27 June 2001	Sweden	
110	Tara Proctor	31 January 1971	20	0			23 July 2002	Nigeria	
111	Marie-Anne Catterall	29 November 1979	6	1	11 February 1996	Portugal			
112	Claire Lacey		1	0	11 February 1996	Portugal	11 February 1996	Portugal	
113	Vicky Exley	22 October 1975	52	7	16 March 1996	Italy	17 September 2007	Argentina	
114	Mary Phillip	14 March 1977	65	0			2 March 2008	Czech Republic	
115	Clare Wheatley	4 February 1971	1	0	1996				
116	Kelley Few		4	0					
117	Kim Jerray-Silver	6 October 1977	1	0	19 May 1996	Portugal	19 May 1996	Portugal	
118	Sue Smith	24 November 1979	94	16	27 February 1997	Germany	9 March 2011	South Korea	
119	Rachel Brown	2 July 1980	82	0	27 February 1997	Germany	21 September 2013	Belarus	
120	Faye White	2 February 1978	90	12	9 March 1997	Scotland	9 July 2011	France	
121	Pru Buckley	20 July 1973	3	0					
122	Natasha Daly	29 November 1979	3	0					
123	Kate Massey	6 June 1979	4	0					
124	Sarah Reed	12 May 1980	4	0					
125	Tina Lindsay		1	0					
126	Rachel Yankey	1 November 1979	129	19	23 August 1997	Scotland	15 July 2013	Russia	
127	Danielle Murphy	4 June 1981	25	0	23 August 1997	Scotland	2001		
128	Justine Lorton	11 March 1974	7	0	23 August 1997	Scotland	22 August 1999	Denmark	
129	Melanie Garside-Wight	11 August 1979	3	0	15 February 1998	France	21 April 1998	Italy	
130	Claire Utley	11 February 1979	4	0					
131	Angela Banks	23 December 1975	18	4	26 May 1999	Italy	19 May 2002	Germany	
132	Katie Chapman	15 June 1982	94	8	13 May 2000	Switzerland	16 April 2016	Belgium	
133	Leanne Hall	19 May 1980	13	0	4 August 2000	France	22 September 2004	Netherlands	
134	Casey Stoney	13 May 1982	130	6	14 August 2000	France	21 October 2017	France	
135	Rachel Unitt	5 June 1982	102	8	14 August 2000	France	8 March 2013	Scotland	
136	Layla Young	21 January 1979	1	0	14 August 2000	France	14 August 2000	France	
137	Aran Embleton	7 October 1981	4	0	21 March 2001	Spain	24 November 2001	Portugal	
138	Amanda Barr	2 May 1982	39	10	27 May 2001	Scotland	13 May 2007	Northern Ireland	
139	Carly Hunt	9 February 1982	7	0	1 March 2002	Norway	24 February 2003	Italy	
140	Fara Williams	25 January 1984	172	40	24 November 2001	Portugal	3 September 2019	Norway	
141	Rachel Stowell (née McArthur)	27 July 1977	14	1	1 March 2002	Norway			
142	Una Nwajei	17 March 1977	3	0	1 March 2002	Norway			
143	Kristy Moore	28 January 1977	14	0	23 July 2002	Nigeria			
144	Jody Handley	12 March 1979	38	6	23 July 2002	Nigeria	1 March 2010	Switzerland	
145	Leanne Champ	10 August 1983	10	0	25 February 2003	Italy			
146	Laura Bassett	2 August 1983	63	2	25 February 2003	Italy	27 July 2017	Portugal	
147	Kelly McDougall	22 January 1984	9	0	25 February 2003	Italy	18 September 2004	Netherlands	
148	Carmaine Walker	5 November 1979	7	0	25 February 2003	Italy	14 May 2004	Iceland	
149	Ellen Maggs	16 February 1983	4	0	19 May 2003	Canada			
150	Alexa Hunn		1	0	22 May 2003	Canada	May 2003		
151	Corinne Yorston	15 June 1983	6	0	11 September 2003	Germany	16 July 2009	Iceland	
152	Anita Asante	27 April 1985	71	2	14 May 2004	Iceland	1 March 2018	France	
153	Lindsay Johnson	8 May 1980	43	1	18 September 2004	Netherlands	9 March 2011	South Korea	
154	Eniola Aluko	21 February 1987	105	33	18 September 2004	Netherlands	12 April 2017	Bosnia and Herzegovina	
155	Alex Scott	14 October 1984	140	12	18 September 2004	Netherlands	27 July 2017	Portugal	
156	Jo Potter	13 November 1984	35	3	18 September 2004	Netherlands	24 November 2017	Bosnia and Herzegovina	
157	Siobhan Chamberlain	15 August 1983	50	0	22 September 2004	Netherlands	4 March 2018	Germany	
158	Jo Fletcher	31 December 1980	9	0	17 February 2005	Italy	8 June 2005	Denmark	
159	Emily Westwood	5 April 1984	32	4	17 February 2005	Italy	1 March 2010	Switzerland	
160	Karen Carney	1 August 1987	144	33	18 February 2005	Italy	6 July 2019	Sweden	
161	Karen Bardsley	14 October 1984	81	0	9 March 2005	Northern Ireland	13 April 2021	Canada	
162	Lianne Sanderson	3 February 1988	50	15	11 May 2006	Hungary	4 July 2015	Germany	
163	Jill Scott	2 February 1987	161	26	31 August 2006	Netherlands	31 July 2022	Germany	
164	Steph Houghton	23 April 1988	121	13	8 March 2007	Russia	23 February 2021	Northern Ireland	
165	Carly Telford	7 July 1987	28	0	11 March 2007	Scotland	13 April 2021	Canada	
166	Kay Hawke	28 March 1983	1	0	14 February 2008	Norway			
167	Michelle Hickmott	20 February 1985	1	0	February 2009	Finland	February 2009	Finland	
168	Jessica Clarke	5 May 1989	51	11	5 March 2009	South Africa	29 November 2015	Bosnia and Herzegovina	
169	Danielle Bowman (née Buet)	31 October 1988	8	0	5 March 2009	South Africa	22 September 2011	Slovenia	
170	Dunia Susi	11 August 1987	21	0	16 July 2009	Iceland	26 June 2013	Japan	
171	**Rachel Williams**	10 January 1988	15	4	16 July 2009	Iceland	1 March 2017	France	
172	Gemma Davison	17 April 1987	17	2	16 July 2009	Iceland	24 January 2017	Sweden	
173	Natasha Dowie	30 June 1988	14	5	26 November 2009	Turkey	17 September 2014	Montenegro	
174	Ellen White	9 May 1989	113	52	25 March 2010	Austria	31 July 2022	Germany	
175	Claire Rafferty	11 January 1989	18	0	25 March 2010	Austria	24 January 2017	Sweden	
176	Sophie Bradley-Auckland	21 October 1989	28	0	21 August 2010	Austria	14 June 2014	Belarus	
177	Fern Whelan	5 December 1988	3	0	17 May 2011	Sweden	1 March 2012	Switzerland	
178	Jade Moore	22 October 1990	50	1	28 February 2012	Finland	6 July 2019	Sweden	
179	Toni Duggan	25 July 1991	79	22	19 September 2012	Croatia	11 March 2020	Spain	
180	**Jordan Nobbs**	8 December 1992	71	8	6 March 2013	Italy	19 February 2023	Italy	
181	**Lucy Bronze**	28 October 1991	148	22	26 June 2013	Japan	5 June 2026	Spain	
182	**Gemma Bonner**	13 July 1991	12	1	26 September 2013	Turkey	5 April 2019	Spain	
183	**Demi Stokes**	12 December 1991	69	1	17 January 2014	Norway	11 October 2022	Czech Republic	
184	**Alex Greenwood**	7 September 1993	113	7	5 March 2014	Italy	13 October 2026	Greece	
185	Lizzie Durack	20 May 1994	1	0	7 March 2014	Finland	7 March 2014	Finland	
186	Fran Kirby	29 June 1993	77	19	3 August 2014	Sweden	30 May 2025	Portugal	
187	Jodie Taylor	17 May 1986	51	19	3 August 2014	Sweden	9 November 2019	Germany	
188	Amy Turner	4 July 1991	4	0	6 March 2015	Australia	29 November 2015	Bosnia and Herzegovina	
189	Izzy Christiansen	20 September 1991	31	6	21 September 2015	Estonia	5 March 2019	Japan	
190	Danielle Carter	18 May 1993	4	6	21 September 2015	Estonia	28 November 2017	Kazakhstan	
191	Gilly Flaherty	24 August 1991	9	0	23 October 2015	China	24 January 2017	Sweden	
192	Drew Spence	23 October 1992	1	0	23 October 2015	China	23 October 2015	China	
193	Laura Coombs	29 January 1991	7	0	23 October 2015	China	1 August 2023	China	
194	Jemma Rose	19 January 1992	1	0	29 November 2015	Bosnia and Herzegovina	29 November 2015	Bosnia and Herzegovina	
195	Rachel Daly	6 December 1991	84	16	4 June 2016	Serbia	9 April 2024	Republic of Ireland	
196	**Nikita Parris**	10 March 1994	74	17	4 June 2016	Serbia	8 April 2025	Belgium	
197	Millie Bright	21 August 1993	88	6	20 September 2016	Belgium	8 April 2025	Belgium	
198	Mary Earps	7 March 1993	53	0	10 June 2017	Switzerland	21 February 2025	Portugal	
199	**Melissa Lawley**	28 April 1994	12	1	20 October 2017	France	8 October 2019	Portugal	
200	**Keira Walsh**	8 April 1997	105	2	28 November 2017	Kazakhstan	13 October 2026	Greece	
201	**Jessica Carter**	27 October 1997	56	3	28 November 2017	Kazakhstan	13 October 2026	Greece	
202	Abbie McManus	1 January 1993	18	0	1 March 2018	France	11 March 2020	Spain	
203	**Hannah Blundell**	25 May 1994	3	0	8 March 2018	United States	8 November 2018	Austria	
204	**Beth Mead**	9 May 1995	83	40	6 April 2018	Wales	13 October 2026	Greece	
205	**Leah Williamson**	29 March 1997	69	5	8 June 2018	Russia	13 October 2026	Greece	
206	**Gabby George**	2 February 1997	3	0	4 September 2018	Kazakhstan	3 December 2024	Switzerland	
207	Lauren Bruton	22 November 1992	1	0	4 September 2018	Kazakhstan	4 September 2018	Kazakhstan	
208	Lucy Staniforth	2 October 1992	17	2	4 September 2018	Kazakhstan	23 October 2021	Northern Ireland	
209	**Georgia Stanway**	3 January 1999	95	35	8 November 2018	Austria	13 October 2026	Greece	
210	**Chioma Ubogagu**	10 September 1992	3	1	8 November 2018	Austria	9 April 2019	Spain	
211	**Ellie Roebuck**	23 September 1999	11	0	8 November 2018	Austria	19 February 2023	Italy	
212	**Chloe Kelly**	15 January 1998	67	9	8 November 2018	Austria	9 June 2026	Ukraine	
213	**Bethany England**	3 June 1994	26	11	29 August 2019	Belgium	20 August 2023	Spain	
214	**Lauren Hemp**	7 August 2000	80	21	8 October 2019	Portugal	13 October 2026	Greece	
215	**Alessia Russo**	8 February 1999	69	33	11 March 2020	Spain	13 October 2026	Greece	
216	**Ella Toone**	2 September 1999	69	24	23 February 2021	Northern Ireland	5 June 2026	Spain	
217	**Lotte Wubben-Moy**	11 January 1999	19	1	23 February 2021	Northern Ireland	5 June 2026	Spain	
218	Sandy MacIver	18 June 1998	1	0	23 February 2021	Northern Ireland	23 February 2021	Northern Ireland	
219	**Ebony Salmon**	27 January 2001	4	0	23 February 2021	Northern Ireland	19 February 2023	Italy	
220	**Niamh Charles**	21 June 1999	35	0	9 April 2021	France	13 October 2026	Greece	
221	**Katie Zelem**	20 January 1996	12	0	30 November 2021	Latvia	26 September 2023	Netherlands	
222	**Hannah Hampton**	16 November 2000	31	0	20 February 2022	Spain	13 October 2026	Greece	
223	**Lauren James**	29 September 2001	42	11	3 September 2022	Austria	13 October 2026	Greece	
224	**Esme Morgan**	18 October 2000	26	0	11 October 2022	Czech Republic	9 October 2026	Greece	
225	**Jess Park**	21 October 2001	28	5	11 November 2022	Japan	13 October 2026	Greece	
226	**Maya Le Tissier**	18 April 2002	16	1	15 November 2022	Norway	13 October 2026	Greece	
227	**Katie Robinson**	8 August 2002	5	0	15 November 2022	Norway	1 July 2023	Portugal	
228	**Grace Clinton**	31 March 2003	17	3	23 February 2024	Austria	2 December 2025	Ghana	
229	**Millie Turner**	7 July 1996	2	0	27 February 2024	Italy	3 December 2024	Switzerland	
230	**Jessica Naz**	24 September 2000	6	0	12 July 2024	Republic of Ireland	26 February 2025	Spain	
231	**Aggie Beever-Jones**	27 July 2003	16	7	12 July 2024	Republic of Ireland	3 March 2026	Ukraine	
232	**Ruby Mace**	5 September 2003	1	0	3 December 2024	Switzerland	3 December 2024	Switzerland	
233	**Laura Blindkilde Brown**	9 September 2003	8	0	3 December 2024	Switzerland	9 October 2026	Greece	
234	**Michelle Agyemang**	3 February 2006	7	3	8 April 2025	Belgium	28 October 2025	Australia	
235	**Missy Bo Kearns**	14 April 2001	3	0	3 June 2025	Spain	2 December 2025	Ghana	
236	**Khiara Keating**	27 June 2004	1	0	25 October 2025	Brazil	25 October 2025	Brazil	
237	**Taylor Hinds**	25 April 1999	5	0	28 October 2025	Australia	7 March 2026	Iceland	
238	**Lucia Kendall**	20 May 2004	7	1	28 October 2025	Australia	9 June 2026	Ukraine	
239	**Anna Moorhouse**	30 March 1995	2	0	29 November 2025	China	2 December 2025	Ghana	
240	**Anouk Denton**	9 May 2003	1	0	2 December 2025	Ghana	2 December 2025	Ghana	
241	**Poppy Pattinson**	30 April 2000	1	0	3 March 2026	Ukraine	3 March 2026	Ukraine	
242	**Erica Meg Parkinson**	18 April 2008	1	0	9 October 2026	Greece	9 October 2026	Greece	
243	**Grace Fisk**	5 January 1998	2	0	9 October 2026	Greece	13 October 2026	Greece	
244	**Lexi Potter**	17 August 2006	1	0	13 October 2026	Greece	13 October 2026	Greece	
245	**Freya Godfrey**	7 May 2005	1	0	13 October 2026	Greece	13 October 2026	Greece	

== Bibliography ==
- Lopez, Sue (1997). Women on the Ball: A Guide to Women's Football. London, England: Scarlet Press. ISBN 1857270169.
- Owen, Wendy (2005). Kicking Against Tradition: A Career in Women's Football. Tempus. ISBN 0752434276.
