= England women's national football team records and statistics =

The England women's national football team, commonly known as the Lionesses, played their first match officially recognised by The Football Association (FA), England's football governing body, in 1972. Previous teams are often known as the Lost Lionesses. Still, the women's national team was not organised by the FA for the first two decades of its existence. The Women's Football Association (WFA) was the former association that acted as the governing body for women's football in England. It initially operated independently, between 1969 and 1983, then was a county-level affiliate of the FA until 1993, at which point the FA assumed responsibility for women's football in England and the women's game became formally regulated.

During their time under the WFA, England reached the final of Euro 1984, which they lost on penalties. They won Euro 2022 on home soil and Euro 2025 in Switzerland.

This list encompasses honours won by the England national team, and records set by both players and managers including appearance and goal records. It also records England's record victories.

Carol Thomas was the first women's international footballer ever to reach 50 caps, which she achieved in 1985 before retiring from representative football later that year (having amassed 56 caps). Fara Williams holds the record for England appearances, having played 172 times between 2001 and 2019.

Ellen White has scored the most goals for England, with 52. She surpassed Kelly Smith's record on 30 November 2021, scoring a hat-trick against Latvia during a UEFA qualifier for the 2023 FIFA Women's World Cup where England won 20–0, the Lionesses' biggest-ever competitive win.

== Terms ==
- Competitive matches or competitive internationals refer to any matches that are not friendlies, training games, or invitational tournaments, i.e. all of: World Cup qualifiers and finals, European Championship qualifiers and finals, Finalissima, and Nations League group stage and finals.
- Major competitions refers to the same competitions as above, though results only from the final tournaments; major tournaments refers to these such finals.
- Due to poor records and a lack of oversight, there may still be limited recognition of matches played under the WFA; records and statistics prior to 1993 are marked as (WFA era).

== Honours and achievements ==
=== Trophies ===
Major

- FIFA Women's World Cup
  - Runners-up: 2023
  - Third place: 2015
- Women's Finalissima
  - Champions: 2023
- UEFA Women's Championship
  - Champions: 2022, 2025
  - Runners-up: 1984, 2009

Regional

- British Home Championship
  - Champions: 1976

Minor

- Mundialito
  - Champions: 1985, 1988
- Cyprus Cup
  - Champions: 2009, 2013, 2015
- SheBelieves Cup
  - Champions: 2019
- Arnold Clark Cup
  - Champions: 2022, 2023

=== Awards ===
- In 2015, the World Cup squad won the BT Sport Action Woman Awards Team of the Year award.
- In 2019, the World Cup squad won the GQ Men of the Year Inspiration Award.
- The 23-player squad and coach Sarina Wiegman who won the 2022 Euro, the women's team's first major international title, received several honours that year, including:
  - Freedom of the City of London (as individuals)
  - Pride of Britain Awards (2022): Inspiration Award
  - BT Sport Action Woman Awards: Team of the Year
  - Northwest Football Awards: Billy Seymour Impact Award
  - Manchester City of Champions Awards: Hall of Fame induction
  - Just A Ball Game? LGBT+ inclusion and visibility award
  - Sports Journalists' Association Awards: Team of the Year
  - BBC Sports Personality of the Year (2022): Team of the Year Award
  - World Soccer Awards: Women's World Team of the Year
  - Laureus World Sports Awards: Team of the Year nomination
- The 23-player squad and Wiegman who won the 2025 Euro, England's first title retention and first major trophy won outside of England, received further honours:
  - Collectively inducted into the English Football Hall of Fame, housed at the National Football Museum
  - Laureus World Sports Awards: Team of the Year nomination
  - BBC Sports Personality of the Year (2025): Team of the Year Award nomination

== Player appearances ==
=== Most appearances ===
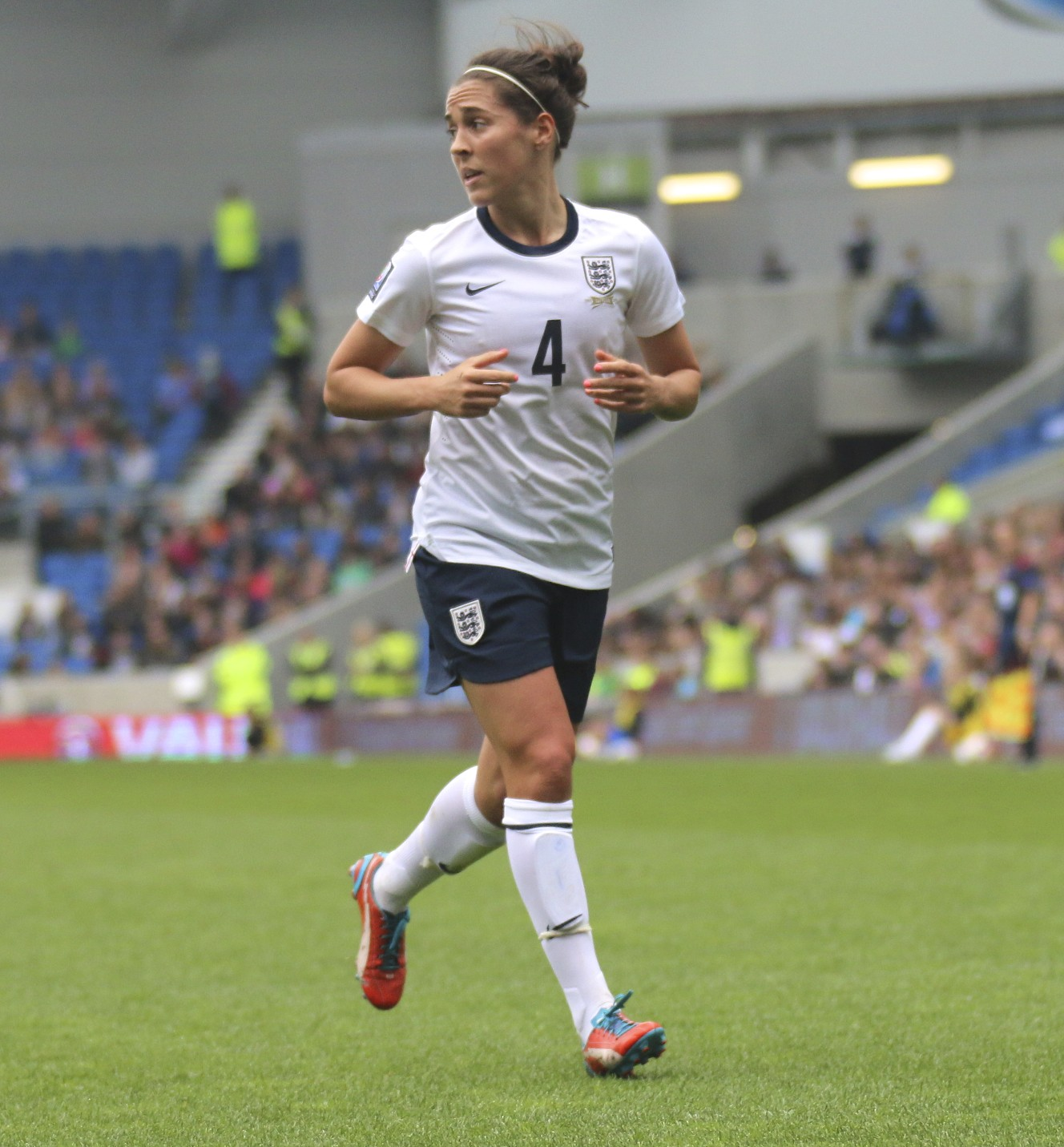
Fara Williams is England's most capped player and fourth highest goalscorer with 40 goals in 172 appearances between 2001 and 2019.

As of 9 June 2026

#	Player	England career	Caps	Goals	Ref
1	Fara Williams	2001–2019	172	40	
2	Jill Scott	2006–2022	161	27	
3	Lucy Bronze	2013–	148	22	
4	Karen Carney	2005–2019	144	32	
5	Alex Scott	2004–2017	140	12	
6	Casey Stoney	2000–2018	130	6	
7	Rachel Yankey	1997–2013	129	19	
8	Steph Houghton	2007–2021	121	13	
9	Gillian Coultard	1981–2000	119	30	
10	Kelly Smith	1995–2014	117	46	

=== Centurions ===
First player to reach 100 appearances
Gillian Coultard
Fastest to reach 100 appearances

As of 14 April 2026. Source as of 27 February 2019:

#	Player	First cap	100th cap	Time taken	Ref (Note: For those who reached 100 caps after 27 February 2019, or the source used when sources disagree.)
1	Keira Walsh	28 November 2017	14 April 2026	8 years, 137 days	
2	Alex Scott	18 September 2004	15 July 2013	8 years, 300 days	
3	Jill Scott	31 August 2006	27 October 2015	9 years, 57 days	
4	Lucy Bronze	26 June 2013	11 October 2022	9 years, 107 days	
5	Karen Carney	18 February 2005	23 November 2014	9 years, 278 days	
6	Fara Williams	24 November 2001	1 March 2012	10 years, 98 days	
7	Alex Greenwood	5 March 2014	5 July 2025	11 years, 122 days	
8	Eniola Aluko	18 September 2004	9 March 2016	11 years, 173 days	
9	Casey Stoney	14 August 2000	4 March 2012	11 years, 203 days	
10	Rachel Unitt	14 August 2000	31 March 2012	11 years, 230 days	
11	Ellen White	25 March 2010	27 November 2021	11 years, 247 days	
12	Steph Houghton	8 March 2007	11 November 2018	11 years, 248 days	
13	Rachel Yankey	23 August 1997	29 July 2010	12 years, 340 days	
14	Kelly Smith	1 November 1995	2 March 2011	15 years, 121 days	
15	Gillian Coultard	2 May 1981	27 February 1997	15 years, 301 days	

=== Firsts ===
==== First player to reach 50 appearances ====
Carol Thomas (Note: Thomas was the first known women's international footballer of any team to achieve 50 caps.)

==== First substitute ====
Wendy Owen, 18 November 1972 (WFA era)

==== Players to debut at the World Cup finals ====
Becky Easton, 8 June 1995 vs. Norway

==== Players to debut at the European Championship finals ====
None as of 27 July 2025

=== Consecutive records ===
==== Most consecutive appearances ====
Known confirmed appearances:

Of 20+ appearances (the most games England has played in a single calendar year, i.e. players must have played consecutive games for at least a year); only the single longest streak of any individual player is listed.

Player	No.	Ref(s)
Carol Thomas	51	
Gillian Coultard	50	(Note: Additional match reports/line-ups for 110–112OVR and 123OVR.)
Rachel Daly	38	
Rachel Unitt	35	
Alex Scott	33	
Sue Smith	31	
Jill Scott	29	
Georgia Stanway	29	
Fara Williams	28	
Steph Houghton	26	
Marieanne Spacey	25	
Samantha Britton	24	
Karen Carney	24	
Keira Walsh	24	
Kerry Davis	22	
Mary Phillip	22	
Casey Stoney	22	
Demi Stokes	22	
Eniola Aluko	22	
Karen Walker	21	
Kelly Smith	20	
Nikita Parris	20	

==== Most consecutive starts at the World Cup and European Championship finals ====
As of 27 July 2025

Of >7 starts (the most games in a tournament finals, i.e. players must have consecutively started more than all games in a single tournament); players who have multiple streaks appear multiple times; current active streaks listed in italics.

Player	No.	Matches
Lucy Bronze	28	
Georgia Stanway	19	
Millie Bright	13	
Mary Earps	13	
Steph Houghton	12	
Ellen White	11	
Lauren Hemp	11	
Keira Walsh	10	
Steph Houghton	9	
Beth Mead	8	
Keira Walsh	8	

==== Most consecutive years of appearances ====
Gillian Coultard, 20 (1981–2000, inclusive)

==== Most tournaments appeared in consecutively ====
Only includes tournaments in which the player did play, minimum of 5 consecutive tournament appearances.

Player	No.	Tournaments
Jill Scott	8	2007, 2009, 2011, (Note: Also appeared for Great Britain at the 2012 Summer Olympics) 2013, 2015, 2017, 2019, (Note: Also appeared for Great Britain at the 2020 Summer Olympics) 2022
Karen Carney	8	2005, 2007, 2009, 2011, 2013, 2015, 2017, 2019
Fara Williams	7	2005, 2007, 2009, 2011, 2013, 2015, 2017
Alex Scott	7	2005, 2007, 2009, 2011, 2013, 2015, 2017
Eni Aluko	6	2005, 2007, 2009, 2011, 2013, 2015
Ellen White	6	2011, 2013, 2015, 2017, 2019, 2022
Lucy Bronze	6	2015, 2017, 2019, 2022, 2023, 2025
Alex Greenwood	6	2015, 2017, 2019, (Note: Greenwood did not appear at the 2020 Summer Olympics, however this tournament was contested by Great Britain rather than England.) 2022, 2023, 2025
Kelly Smith	5	2005, 2007, 2009, 2011, 2013
Casey Stoney	5	2007, 2009, 2011, 2013, 2015
Steph Houghton	5	2011, 2013, 2015, 2017, 2019,
Karen Bardsley	5	2011, 2013, 2015, 2017, 2019

==== Most consecutive appearances by an unchanged team ====
On three occasions the England women's football team has fielded an unchanged starting XI for more than two consecutive games:

No.	Event	Matches	Starting XI
6	UEFA Women's Euro 2022	6 July 2022 England 1–0 Austria; 11 July 2022 England 8–0 Norway; 15 July 2022 Northern Ireland 0–5 England; 20 July 2022 England 2–1 Spain; 26 July 2022 England 4–0 Sweden; 31 July 2022 England 2–1 Germany	Mary Earps, Lucy Bronze, Millie Bright, Leah Williamson, Rachel Daly, Keira Walsh, Fran Kirby, Georgia Stanway, Beth Mead, Ellen White, Lauren Hemp
4	1984 European Competition for Women's Football	8 April 1984 England 2–1 Denmark; 28 April 1984 Denmark 0–1 (1–3 agg.) England; 12 May 1984 Sweden 1–0 England; 27 May 1984 England 1–0 (1–1 agg., 3–4 p.) Sweden	Theresa Wiseman, Carol Thomas, Morag Pearce, Lorraine Hanson, Angie Gallimore, Gillian Coultard, Liz Deighan, Debbie Bampton, Linda Curl, Kerry Davis, Pat Chapman
3	UEFA Women's Euro 2025	9 July 2025 England 4–0 Netherlands; 13 July 2025 England 6–1 Wales; 17 July 2025 Sweden 2–2 (2–3 p.) England	Hannah Hampton, Lucy Bronze, Leah Williamson, Jess Carter, Alex Greenwood, Keira Walsh, Georgia Stanway, Ella Toone, Lauren James, Alessia Russo, Lauren Hemp

=== Mosts ===
==== Most appearances without ever playing at the World Cup finals ====
Theresa Wiseman, 68

==== Most appearances at the European Championship finals ====
Lucy Bronze, 16
Karen Carney, 15

==== Most appearances total at the World Cup and European Championship finals ====
Source as of 22 July 2025:

Lucy Bronze, 36
Jill Scott, 35
Karen Carney, 32
Ellen White, 27
Fara Williams, 27

=== Time spans ===
==== Longest England career ====
Gillian Coultard, 19 years and 10 days, 3 May 1981 – 13 May 2000 (including WFA era)

==== Shortest England career ====
Anouk Denton, 2 minutes, 2 December 2025

==== Appearances at three World Cup final tournaments ====
The following players have appeared in (at least) three World Cup final tournaments:

Player	World Cup appearances				
Player	2007	2011	2015	2019	2023
Fara Williams	Yes	Yes	Yes	No	No
Alex Scott	Yes	Yes	Yes	No	No
Eniola Aluko	Yes	Yes	Yes	No	No
Casey Stoney	Yes	Yes	Yes	No	No
Jill Scott	Yes	Yes	Yes	Yes	No
Karen Carney	Yes	Yes	Yes	Yes	No
Ellen White	No	Yes	Yes	Yes	No
Steph Houghton	No	Yes	Yes	Yes	No
Karen Bardsley	No	Yes	Yes	Yes	No
Lucy Bronze	No	No	Yes	Yes	Yes
Alex Greenwood	No	No	Yes	Yes	Yes

==== Appearances in three separate decades ====
The following players have made appearances in three separate decades:

Player	Decades appeared in					
Player	1970s	1980s	1990s	2000s	2010s	2020s
Debbie Bampton	Yes	Yes	Yes	No	No	No
Gillian Coultard	No	Yes	Yes	Yes	No	No
Marieanne Spacey	No	Yes	Yes	Yes	No	No
Karen Walker	No	Yes	Yes	Yes	No	No
Rachel Brown-Finnis	No	No	Yes	Yes	Yes	No
Kelly Smith	No	No	Yes	Yes	Yes	No
Sue Smith	No	No	Yes	Yes	Yes	No
Faye White	No	No	Yes	Yes	Yes	No
Rachel Yankey	No	No	Yes	Yes	Yes	No
Karen Bardsley	No	No	No	Yes	Yes	Yes
Steph Houghton	No	No	No	Yes	Yes	Yes
Jill Scott	No	No	No	Yes	Yes	Yes

=== Youngests ===
==== Youngest players ====
Morag Pearce, 15 years, 18 November 1972 (WFA era)
Linda Curl, 15 years, 28 April 1977 (WFA era)

==== Youngest player to feature at the World Cup finals ====
Lianne Sanderson, 19 years and 231 days, 22 September 2007

==== Youngest player to feature at the European Championship finals ====
Hope Powell, 17 years and 171 days, 27 May 1984 (WFA era)
Karen Carney, 17 years and 308 days, 5 June 2005 (FA era)

=== Oldests ===
==== Oldest debutante ====
Anna Moorhouse, 30 years 244 days, 29 November 2025

=== Players capped by another country ===
Players who have made senior international appearances for England and another country

Other country	Player	England career	Other career	Ref
Australia	Kristy Moore	2002–2004	1997	
Jamaica	Drew Spence	2015	2021–	
Jamaica	Taylor Hinds	2025–	2024	
Netherlands	Jeannie Allott (WFA era) (Note: Due to the lack of oversight with unaffiliated national teams, Allott was able to represent the Netherlands purely by virtue of living there, and was able to make double-digits appearances for both national teams.)	1972–1976	1985–1987	
New Zealand	Audrey Rigby (WFA era)	1976	1983–1987	
Scotland	Sandy MacIver	2021	2023–	
Wales	Alison Leatherbarrow (WFA era) (Note: Due to the lack of oversight of unaffiliated national teams, Leatherbarrow was able to represent another country after 19 England caps.)	1975–1979	?	
Wales	Sian Williams	1992–2000	1985	

- Rinsola Babajide played two uncapped behind-closed-doors matches with England in 2020, but has not received an official cap. She began representing Nigeria in 2023.

== Goalscoring ==
=== Top goalscorers ===
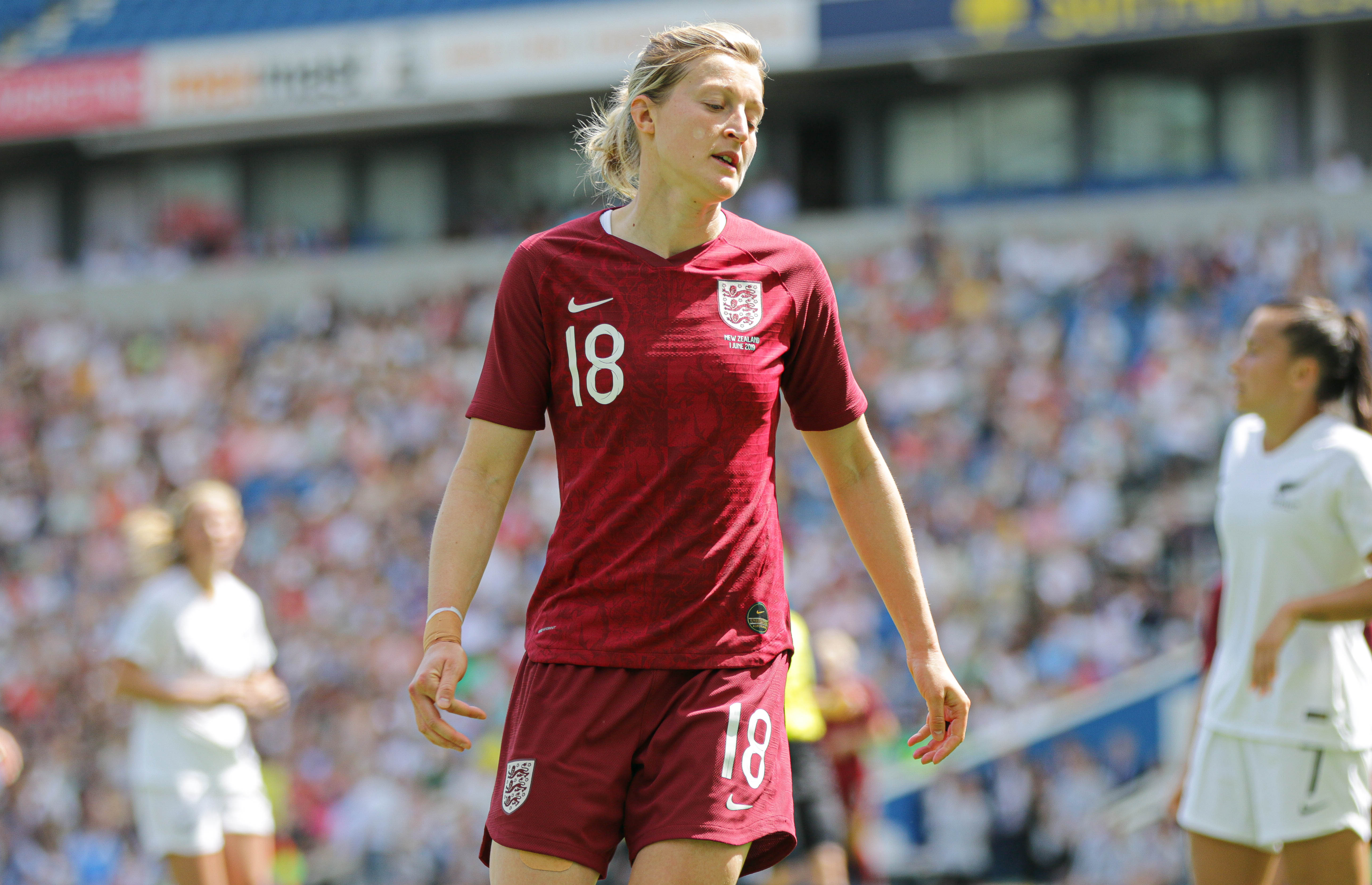
Ellen White is England's top goalscorer with 52 goals in 113 appearances.

As of 9 June 2026

#	Name	England career	Goals	Caps	Average	Ref
1	Ellen White (list)	2010–2022	52	113	0.46	
2	Kelly Smith (list)	1995–2015	46	117	0.39	
3	Kerry Davis	1982–1998	43	90	0.54	
4	Karen Walker	1988–2003	41	86	0.48	
5=	Beth Mead	2018–	40	80	0.50	
5=	Fara Williams	2001–2019	40	172	0.23	
7=	Georgia Stanway	2019–	33	92	0.36	
7=	Eniola Aluko	2004–2017	33	105	0.31	
7=	Karen Carney	2005–2019	33	144	0.22	
10=	Alessia Russo	2020–	31	65	0.46	
10=	Marieanne Spacey	1984–2001	30	94	0.32	

=== Firsts ===
==== First goal ====
Sylvia Gore, 18 November 1972 vs. Scotland (WFA era)
Clare Taylor, 25 September 1993 vs. Slovenia (FA era)

==== First goal in a World Cup finals match ====
Gillian Coultard, 6 June 1995 vs. Canada (Note: Coultard scored England women's first overall goal, a penalty in the 51st minute, and first goal from open play, in the 85th, during the team's first match at a World Cup finals.)

==== First goal in a World Cup qualifying campaign ====
Hope Powell, 17 March 1990 vs. Belgium (Note: The same qualification competition was used for both the World Cup and Euro in 1991.)

==== First goal in a European Championship finals match ====
Kerry Davis, 8 April 1984 vs. Denmark (unofficial) (Note: Until Euro 1991, the tournaments were not given official recognition status by UEFA.)
Karen Farley, 11 December 1994 vs. Germany (official)

==== First goal in a European Championship qualifying campaign ====
? possibly Kerry Davis, 19 September 1982 vs. Northern Ireland (unofficial)
Hope Powell, 17 March 1990 vs. Belgium (official)

==== First goal by a substitute ====
Eileen Foreman, 23 June 1973 vs. Scotland (WFA era)
Kerry Davis, 25 September 1993 vs. Slovenia (FA era)

=== Mosts ===
==== Highest goals to games average ====
Danielle Carter, 6 goals in 4 games, average 1.5 goals per game (Note: All of Carter's six England goals came from two hat-tricks, in her first two games, also making her England women's only player to score consecutive hat-tricks.)

==== Most goals on debut ====
Pat Firth, 3, 23 June 1973 (WFA era)
Danielle Carter, 3, 21 September 2015 (FA era)

==== Most goals in a European Championship tournament ====
Beth Mead, 6, Euro 2022

==== Most goals in total at European Championship tournaments ====
Beth Mead, 7, as of 27 July 2025

==== Most goals scored from penalties ====
Georgia Stanway, 14, as of 3 March 2026

==== Most goals scored by a defender ====
Lucy Bronze, 22, as of 7 March 2026

==== Scoring in most consecutive internationals ====
Kerry Davis, 7, March 1986–November 1987

==== Most goalscorers in a match ====
10 vs. Latvia, 30 November 2021: Beth Mead, Ellen White, Lauren Hemp, Ella Toone, Georgia Stanway, Jess Carter, Bethany England, Jill Scott, Alessia Russo, Jordan Nobbs

=== Oldests ===
==== Oldest goalscorer ====
Kerry Davis, 35 years 197 days, 15 February 1998

==== Oldest goalscorer on debut ====
Sylvia Gore, 27 years 359 days, 18 November 1972 (WFA era)

==== Oldest first-time goalscorer ====
Mo Marley, 30 years 37 days, 9 March 1997

=== Youngests ===
==== Youngest goalscorer ====
Jeannie Allott, 16 years 1 day, 18 November 1972 (WFA era)
Marie-Anne Catterall, 16 years 74 days, 11 February 1996 (FA era)

==== Youngest goalscorer on debut ====
Jeannie Allott, 16 years 1 day, 18 November 1972 (WFA era)

=== Speed and time spans ===
==== Fastest goal from kick-off ====
Rachel Yankey, 52 seconds, 22 September 2011 vs. Slovenia

==== Fastest goal at Wembley ====
Lauren Hemp, 2 minutes 34 seconds, 14 April 2026 vs Spain

==== Fastest goal by a substitute ====
Michelle Agyemang, 41 seconds, 8 April 2025

=== Hat-tricks ===
==== First player to score a hat-trick ====
Pat Firth, 23 June 1973 (WFA era)
Marieanne Spacey, 72nd minute, 25 September 1993 (FA era) (Note: Both Spacey and Walker scored hat-tricks in the first match under charge of the FA. Spacey scored in 22', 36', 72', 87' and Walker scored in 39', 48', 82'.)
Karen Walker, 82nd minute, 25 September 1993 (FA era)

==== Oldest player to score a hat-trick ====
Ellen White, 32 years 205 days, 30 November 2021

==== Youngest player to score a hat-trick ====
Pat Firth, 16 years 11 days, 23 June 1973 (WFA era)
Lauren Hemp, 21 years 115 days, 30 November 2021 (FA era)

==== Four goals or more in a match on the greatest number of occasions ====
Kerry Davis, twice

==== Three goals or more in a match on the greatest number of occasions ====
Beth Mead, four times

==== Players to score exclusively with hat-tricks ====
Danielle Carter scored in two matches for six England goals.
Gemma Davison only scored in one match. Sources generally report that Davison scored a hat-trick, though the third of these was officially recorded as a Serbia own goal.

=== Non-scoring records ===
For one game in 2025, the England women's team was in the unusual position of its highest-capped non-scoring player ever being not only an outfield player, but a midfielder.

==== Most appearances for an outfield player without ever scoring ====
Mary Phillip, 65

==== Highest cap reached without scoring ====
As of 19 April 2025.

#	Cap	Player	Position	Date (Note: Of relevant cap, i.e. last match without scoring after debut.)	Ref
1	82	Rachel Brown-Finnis	Goalkeeper	21 September 2013 (r)	
1	82	Keira Walsh	Midfielder	26 February 2025 (Note: Walsh scored her debut England goal on her 83rd cap on 4 April 2025.)	
3	81	Karen Bardsley	Goalkeeper	13 April 2021 (r)	
4	68	Theresa Wiseman	Goalkeeper	1991 (r)	
5	65	Mary Phillip	Defender	2 March 2008 (r)	
6	60	Pauline Cope	Goalkeeper	19 February 2004 (r)	
7	56	Carol Thomas	Defender	22 September 1985 (r)	
8	53	Mary Earps	Goalkeeper	21 February 2025 (r)	
9	50	Siobhan Chamberlain	Goalkeeper	4 March 2018 (r)	

== Goalkeeping ==
Penalty saves refer to penalty shots on target saved by the goalkeeper; the relevant records do not include the opposition missing penalty shots. A goalkeeper has to have played at least 45 minutes of a match to be credited with its clean sheet.

As of 14 April 2026

=== Most clean sheets ===
Sixteen goalkeepers have kept at least one clean sheet:

Goalkeeper	Clean sheets
Karen Bardsley	43
Rachel Brown-Finnis	29
Theresa Wiseman	28
Mary Earps	26
Siobhan Chamberlain	22
Pauline Cope	17
Hannah Hampton	13
Sue Buckett	9
Tracey Davidson	9
Carly Telford	8
Lesley Shipp	7
Jo Fletcher	4
Ellie Roebuck	4
Anna Moorhouse	2
Terri Irvine	1
Leanne Hall	1

=== Most penalty saves in shoot outs ===
Five goalkeepers have faced at least one penalty shoot-out:

Goalkeeper	Saves	S-Os	Avg	Ref(s)
Hannah Hampton	4	2	2	
Karen Bardsley	1	1	1	
Mary Earps	1	2	0.5	
Theresa Wiseman	0	1	0	
Jo Fletcher	0	1	0	

== Captains ==
Records and statistics relate to known named captains, i.e. listed on the teamsheet and started the match as captain.

=== First captain ===
Sheila Parker, 18 November 1972 (WFA era)
Gillian Coultard, 25 September 1993 (FA era)

=== Most appearances as captain ===
Steph Houghton, 72, 17 January 2014 – 8 March 2020

=== Fewest appearances prior to captaincy ===
Not including the captain of the first match (i.e. 0) (Note: Otherwise, no England women's player has been named captain on debut. No England women's player has been captain on all of their international appearances.)

Carol Thomas, 6 (WFA era)
Keira Walsh, 6 (FA era)

=== Longest-serving captain ===
Faye White, 9 years 124 days, 7 March 2002 – 9 July 2011

=== Youngest captain ===
Carol Thomas, 20 years 352 days, (Note: Generally reported as being named captain aged 21, the first England match of the 1976 Home International was in May 1976, with Thomas' birthday in June.) 22 May 1976 (WFA era)
Keira Walsh, 21 years 149 days, 4 September 2018 (FA era)

=== Oldest captain ===
Gillian Coultard, 36 years 296 days, 13 May 2000

=== Most players to captain a single match ===
4 vs. Latvia, 30 November 2021: Millie Bright, Ellen White, Keira Walsh, Alex Greenwood
4 vs. China, 29 November 2025: Keira Walsh, Lucy Bronze, Alessia Russo, Georgia Stanway

== Discipline ==
=== Red cards ===
No player has received more than one red card. As one red card was rescinded on appeal, the England women's team is in the unusual situation of having had more different players sent off than the team has red cards total in its history.

==== Most red cards ====
#	Number	Player	Date	Ref
1	1	Casey Stoney	25 August 2009	
1	1	Gemma Bonner	4 March 2015	
1	1	Alex Greenwood	6 April 2018	
1	1	Millie Bright	2 July 2019	
1	1	Lauren James	7 August 2023 (Note: With Reece James' red card for the men's team on 14 October 2020, the Jameses are the only pair of siblings to both be sent off for England.)	

==== List of all England players sent off ====
As of 11 April 2025

Player	Date	Against	Location	Result	Match
Casey Stoney	25 August 2009	Italy	Lahti Stadium, Lahti, Finland	1–2	UEFA Women's Euro 2009 group stage
Rachel Brown-Finnis (Note: Swiss forward Ramona Bachmann later admitted there had been no foul and apologised for her simulation, and Brown's red card was rescinded on appeal.)	16 September 2010	Switzerland	Stadion Niedermatten, Wohlen	3–2 (5–2 agg.)	2011 World Cup qualifying play-offs
Gemma Bonner	4 March 2015	Finland	GSZ Stadium, Larnaca, Cyprus	3–1	Cyprus Cup group stage
Alex Greenwood	6 April 2018	Bosnia and Herzegovina	Koševo City Stadium, Sarajevo	2–0	2019 World Cup qualifying
Millie Bright	2 July 2019	United States	Parc Olympique Lyonnais, Décines-Charpieu, France	1–2	2019 World Cup semi-final
Lauren James	7 August 2023	Nigeria	Lang Park, Brisbane, Australia	0–0 (a.e.t.; 4–2 p)	2023 World Cup round of 16

== Manager records ==
=== England players who later became England manager/head coach ===
Person	Playing career	Managerial career
Hope Powell	1983–1998	1998–2013
Mo Marley	1995–2001	2017 (caretaker)

=== Managerial results record ===
As of 13 October 2026

Image	Manager	Tenure	P	W	D	L	Win %	Competitions
	(England) Harry Batt	1969–1970, 1972	6	1	0	5	16.7	unofficial matches
	(England) Frank Baker	1971	1	0	0	1	0.0	unofficial match
	(England) Eric Worthington	1972	1	1	0	0	100.0	
	(England) Tom Tranter	1973–1979	25	17	2	6	68.0	
	(England) Mike Rawding	1979	1	0	1	0	0.0	
	(England) Martin Reagan	1980–1990	61	28	14	19	45.9	Euro 1984 runners-up Euro 1987 fourth place
	(Wales) Barrie Williams	1991	1	1	0	0	100.0	
	(England) John Bilton	1991–1992	11	5	2	4	45.5	
	(England) Ted Copeland	1993–1998	35	15	5	15	42.9	Euro 1995 semi-finals 1995 World Cup quarter-finals
	(England) Dick Bate	1998 (caretaker)	3	0	0	3	0.0	
	(England) Hope Powell	1998–2013	169	85	33	51	50.3	Euro 2001 group stage Euro 2005 group stage 2007 World Cup quarter-finals Euro 2009 runners-up 2011 World Cup quarter-finals Euro 2013 group stage
	(England) Brent Hills	2006, 2013 (caretaker)	5	4	0	1	80.0	
	(Wales) Mark Sampson	2013–2017	60	39	8	13	65.0	2015 World Cup third place Euro 2017 semi-finals
	(England) Mo Marley	2017 (caretaker)	3	2	0	1	66.7	
	(England) Phil Neville	2018–2021	35	19	5	11	54.3	2019 World Cup fourth place
	(Norway) Hege Riise	2021 (caretaker)	3	1	0	2	33.3	
	(Netherlands) Sarina Wiegman	2021–	82	58	13	11	70.7	Euro 2022 champions 2023 Finalissima champions 2023 World Cup runners-up 2023–24 Nations League fifth place Euro 2025 champions

=== Managerial victories ===
==== Most victories at Wembley ====
9, Sarina Wiegman

==== Most tournament finals match victories ====
18, Sarina Wiegman

== Attendance records ==
As of 28 June 2026, England's overall top five most-attended games are also their top five most-attended home games and top five most-attended games at Wembley.

=== Overall highest attendances ===
	Date	Opponent	Result F–A	Venue	Attendance	Competition
1st place, gold medalist(s)	31 July 2022	Germany	2–1 (a.e.t.)	Wembley Stadium, London, England	87,192	UEFA Women's Euro 2022 final
2nd place, silver medalist(s)	6 April 2023	Brazil	1–1 (4–2 p)	Wembley Stadium, London, England	83,132	2023 Women's Finalissima
3rd place, bronze medalist(s)	30 November 2024	United States	0–0	Wembley Stadium, London, England	78,346	Friendly
4	9 November 2019	Germany	1–2	Wembley Stadium, London, England	77,768	Friendly
5	7 October 2022	United States	2–1	Wembley Stadium, London, England	76,893	Friendly

=== Attendance by location ===
==== Home: all venues ====
Date	Opponent	Result F–A	Venue	Attendance	Competition
31 July 2022	Germany	2–1 (a.e.t.)	Wembley Stadium, London	87,192	UEFA Women's Euro 2022 final
6 April 2023	Brazil	1–1 (4–2 p)	Wembley Stadium, London	83,132	2023 Women's Finalissima
30 November 2024	United States	0–0	Wembley Stadium, London	78,346	Friendly
9 November 2019	Germany	1–2	Wembley Stadium, London	77,768	Friendly
7 October 2022	United States	2–1	Wembley Stadium, London	76,893	Friendly
29 November 2025	China	8–0	Wembley Stadium, London	74,611	Friendly
1 December 2023	Netherlands	3–2	Wembley Stadium, London	71,632	2023–24 UEFA Nations League group stage
6 July 2022	Austria	1–0	Old Trafford, Manchester	68,871	UEFA Women's Euro 2022 group stage
5 April 2024	Sweden	1–1	Wembley Stadium, London	63,248	UEFA Women's Euro 2025 qualifying
14 April 2026	Spain	1–0	Wembley Stadium, London	62,306	2027 FIFA Women's World Cup qualification

==== Home: Wembley ====
Date	Opponent	Result F–A	Attendance	Competition
31 July 2022	Germany	2–1 (a.e.t.)	87,192	UEFA Women's Euro 2022 final
6 April 2023	Brazil	1–1 (4–2 p)	83,132	2023 Women's Finalissima
30 November 2024	United States	0–0	78,346	Friendly
9 November 2019	Germany	1–2	77,768	Friendly
7 October 2022	United States	2–1	76,893	Friendly
29 November 2025	China	8–0	74,611	Friendly
1 December 2023	Netherlands	3–2	71,632	2023–24 UEFA Nations League group stage
5 April 2024	Sweden	1–1	63,248	UEFA Women's Euro 2025 qualifying
14 April 2026	Spain	1–0	62,306	2027 FIFA Women's World Cup qualification
30 May 2025	Portugal	6–0	48,531	2025 UEFA Nations League group stage

==== Away attendance ====
Date	Opponent	Result F–A	Venue	Attendance	Competition
16 August 2023	Australia	3–1	Stadium Australia, Sydney	75,784	2023 FIFA Women's World Cup semi-final
16 August 2000	France	0–1	Stade Vélodrome, Marseille	60,000	Friendly
27 July 2015	Canada	2–1	BC Place, Vancouver	54,027	2015 FIFA Women's World Cup quarter-final
9 April 2024	Republic of Ireland	2–0	Aviva Stadium, Dublin	32,742	UEFA Women's Euro 2025 qualifying
3 August 2017	Netherlands	0–3	De Grolsch Veste, Enschede	27,093	UEFA Women's Euro 2017 semi-final
4 March 2017	United States	1–0	Red Bull Arena, Harrison	26,500	2017 SheBelieves Cup
26 September 2023	Netherlands	1–2	Stadion Galgenwaard, Utrecht	24,000	2023–24 UEFA Nations League group stage
16 November 2002	France	0–1	Stade Geoffroy-Guichard, Saint-Étienne	23,680	2003 FIFA Women's World Cup qualification play-offs
30 May 2015	Canada	0–1	Hamilton Stadium, Hamilton	23,197	Friendly
2 March 2019	United States	2–2	Nissan Stadium, Nashville	22,125	2019 SheBelieves Cup

==== Neutral venue attendance ====
Date	Opponent	Result F–A	Venue	Attendance	Competition
12 August 2023	Colombia	2–1	Stadium Australia, Sydney, Australia	75,784	2023 FIFA Women's World Cup quarter-final
20 August 2023	Spain	0–1	Stadium Australia, Sydney, Australia	75,784	2023 FIFA Women's World Cup final
2 July 2019	United States	1–2	Parc Olympique Lyonnais, Lyon, France	53,512	2019 FIFA Women's World Cup semi-final
7 August 2023	Nigeria	0–0 (a.e.t.; 4–2 p)	Lang Park, Brisbane, Australia	49,461	2023 FIFA Women's World Cup round of 16
22 July 2023	Haiti	1–0	Lang Park, Brisbane, Australia	44,369	2023 FIFA Women's World Cup group stage
28 July 2023	Denmark	1–0	Sydney Football Stadium, Sydney, Australia	40,439	2023 FIFA Women's World Cup group stage
27 July 2025	Spain	1–1 (a.e.t.; 3–1 p)	St. Jakob-Park, Basel, Switzerland	34,203	UEFA Women's Euro 2025 final
1 July 2015	Japan	1–2	Commonwealth Stadium, Edmonton, Canada	31,467	2015 FIFA Women's World Cup semi-final
17 September 2007	Argentina	6–1	Chengdu Sports Centre, Chengdu, China	30,730	2007 FIFA Women's World Cup group stage
22 September 2007	United States	0–3	Tianjin Olympic Centre, Tianjin, China	29,586	2007 FIFA Women's World Cup quarter-final

=== Attendance by format ===
==== Friendly attendance ====
Date	Opponent	Result F–A	Venue	Attendance
30 November 2024	United States	0–0	Wembley Stadium, London, England	78,346
9 November 2019	Germany	1–2	Wembley Stadium, London, England	77,768
7 October 2022	United States	2–1	Wembley Stadium, London, England	76,893
29 November 2025	China	8–0	Wembley Stadium, London, England	74,611
16 August 2000	France	0–1	Stade Vélodrome, Marseille, France	60,000
25 October 2024	Germany	3–4	Wembley Stadium, London, England	47,967
23 November 2014	Germany	0–3	Wembley Stadium, London, England	45,619
25 October 2025	Brazil	1–2	City of Manchester Stadium, Manchester, England	37,460
5 October 2019	Brazil	1–2	Riverside Stadium, Middlesbrough, England	29,238
28 October 2025	Australia	3–0	Pride Park Stadium, Derby, England	26,544

==== Competitive attendance ====
Date	Opponent	Result F–A	Venue	Attendance	Competition
31 July 2022	Germany	2–1 (a.e.t.)	Wembley Stadium, London, England	87,192	UEFA Women's Euro 2022 final
6 April 2023	Brazil	1–1 (4–2 p)	Wembley Stadium, London, England	83,132	2023 Women's Finalissima
12 August 2023	Colombia	2–1	Stadium Australia, Sydney, Australia	75,784	2023 FIFA Women's World Cup quarter-final
16 August 2023	Australia	3–1	Stadium Australia, Sydney, Australia	75,784	2023 FIFA Women's World Cup semi-final
20 August 2023	Spain	0–1	Stadium Australia, Sydney, Australia	75,784	2023 FIFA Women's World Cup final
1 December 2023	Netherlands	3–2	Wembley Stadium, London, England	71,632	2023–24 UEFA Nations League group stage
6 July 2022	Austria	1–0	Old Trafford, Manchester, England	68,871	UEFA Women's Euro 2022 group stage
5 April 2024	Sweden	1–1	Wembley Stadium, London, England	63,248	UEFA Women's Euro 2025 qualifying
14 April 2026	Spain	1–0	Wembley Stadium, London, England	62,306	2027 FIFA Women's World Cup qualification
27 July 2015	Canada	2–1	BC Place, Vancouver, Canada	54,027	2015 FIFA Women's World Cup quarter-final

== Team results records ==
All scorelines show England's score first

=== Scorelines ===
==== Biggest victory ====
20–0 vs. Latvia, 30 November 2021

==== Heaviest defeat ====
0–8 vs. Norway, 4 June 2000

==== Biggest home victory ====
20–0 vs. Latvia, 30 November 2021

==== Heaviest home defeat ====
0–5 vs. Sweden, 25 January 2002

==== Biggest victory at the World Cup finals ====
6–1 vs. Argentina, 17 September 2007
6–1 vs. China, 1 August 2023

==== Heaviest defeat at the World Cup finals ====
0–3 vs. Germany, 13 June 1995
0–3 vs. United States, 22 September 2007

==== Biggest victory at the European Championship finals ====
8–0 vs. Norway, 11 July 2022

==== Heaviest defeat at the European Championship finals ====
0–4 vs. Sweden, 27 June 2001
2–6 vs. Germany, 10 September 2009

==== Biggest victory in a competitive international ====
20–0 vs. Latvia, 30 November 2021

==== Heaviest defeat in a competitive international ====
0–8 vs. Norway, 4 June 2000

=== Consecutive streaks ===
==== Most consecutive victories in competitive internationals ====
16, 17 September 2021 vs. North Macedonia – 6 September 2022 vs. Luxembourg (Note: These games comprised the entirety of the 2023 World Cup qualifiers and the 2022 Euro. The next competitive match, the 2023 Finalissima, was a draw that England won by penalty shoot-out. Prior to this run, England had not lost a competitive international since the 2019 World Cup.)

==== Most consecutive matches without defeat in competitive internationals ====
23, 17 September 2021 vs. North Macedonia – 16 August 2023 vs. Australia (Note: These games comprised the entirety of the 2023 World Cup qualifiers, the 2022 Euro, and the 2023 Finalissima, plus the 2023 World Cup up to and including the semi-final. Prior to this run, England had not lost a competitive international since the 2019 World Cup. If considering the 2011 World Cup quarter-final loss by penalty shoot-out as a draw, i.e. undefeated, England previously had a run of 22 matches undefeated from 25 October 2009 – 19 September 2012.)

==== Most consecutive draws ====
2, which has happened on fourteen occasions

== Club records ==
=== Players per club ===
==== Clubs providing the most players in a major tournament squad ====
Arsenal, 9, 2007 World Cup
Manchester City, 9, Euro 2022

== See also ==
- England national football team records and statistics

== General references ==
Goodwin, C.; Isherwood, G.; Young, P. "England Football Online".

Naylor, D. "englandstats.com - England International Database".

"11v11.com - Home of football statistics and history". Association of Football Statisticians.
