= England women's national football team results (1972–1979) =

- Win Draw Loss

This is a list of the England women's national football team results from 1972 to 1979.

== Results ==
=== 1972 ===
18 November 1972 Friendly	Scotland	2–3	England	Greenock, Scotland
	Carr; Reilly		Gore; Hale; Allott	Stadium: Ravenscraig Stadium; Attendance: 400; Referee: J Clelland

=== 1973 ===
22 April 1973 Friendly	France	0–3	England	Brion, France
			Foreman; Davies	Stadium: Stade Brion; Attendance: 3,000; Referee: Marcel Bacou

23 June 1973 Friendly	England	8–0	Scotland	Nuneaton, England
	Firth; Davies; McGroarty; Foreman			Stadium: Manor Park; Attendance: 1,308

7 September 1973 Friendly	England	5–1	Northern Ireland	Bath, England
	Allott; Hale; Dunlop (o.g.); Gore		Gillespi	Stadium: Twerton Park; Referee: P Davies

9 November 1973 Friendly	England	1–0	Netherlands	Reading, England
	McGroarty 34'			Stadium: Elm Park; Attendance: 2,015; Referee: Kieth Walker

=== 1974 ===
17 March 1974 Friendly	England	5–0	Wales	Slough, England
	McGroarty; Davies; Firth; Manning			Stadium: Wexham Park; Attendance: 500; Referee: D Haywood

31 May 1974 Friendly	Netherlands	0–3	England	Groningen, Netherlands
			Bagguley 10'; Davies 20'; Lopez 65'	Stadium: Stadspark; Attendance: 3,000; Referee: Frans Derks

7 November 1974 Friendly	England	2–0	France	Wimbledon, England
	Davies; Lopez			Stadium: Plough Lane; Attendance: 2,000; Referee: Ray Regester
Note: Game consisted of two 40-minute halves.

=== 1975 ===
19 April 1975 Friendly	Switzerland	1–3	England	Basel, Switzerland
	Barmettler		Choat	Stadium: Stadion Schützenmatte; Attendance: 3,000; Referee: Ernst Dörflinger

15 June 1975 Friendly	Sweden	2–0	England	Gothenburg, Sweden
	Jansson 36', 39'			Stadium: Gamla Ullevi; Attendance: 2,963; Referee: Ǻke Jansson

7 September 1975 Friendly	England	1–3	Sweden	Wimbledon, England
	Deighan 15'		Sundhage 34'; Håkansson 47', 61'	Stadium: Plough Lane; Referee: Bartley John Homewood

=== 1976 ===
2 May 1976 Friendly	England	2–1	Netherlands	Blackpool, England
	Badrock 16'; Choat 30' (pen.)		de Visser 20'	Stadium: Borough Park; Attendance: 4,000; Referee: K Walmsley
Note: Game consisted of two 35-minute halves.

22 May 1976 The Pony Home International Championship	England	4–0	Wales	Bedford, England
	Firth; Badrock; Poppy			Stadium: The Eyrie Ground; Referee: John Hunting

23 May 1976 The Pony Home International Championship	England	5–1	Scotland	Enfield, England
	?; ?; ?; ?; ?		?	Stadium: Southbury Road Ground; Referee: John Homewood

2 June 1976 Friendly	Italy	2–0	England	Rome, Italy
	Vignotto 31', 59'			Stadium: Stadio Flaminio; Referee: Barra

5 June 1976 Friendly	Italy	2–1	England	Cesena, Italy
	Ciceri 23'; Ferraguzzi 66'		Coffin 21'	Stadium: Stadio La Fiorita; Attendance: 1,500; Referee: Beretta

17 October 1976 Friendly	Wales	1–2	England	Ebbw Vale, Wales
	?		Hadden; Badrock	Stadium: Eugene Cross Welfare Ground

=== 1977 ===
26 February 1977 Friendly	France	0–0	England	Longjumeau, France
		Report		Attendance: 1,200; Referee: Jean Muchembled

28 April 1977 Friendly	England	9–1	Switzerland	Kingston-upon-Hull, England
	Foreman; Chapman; Deighan; Parker; Coffin		Boll	Stadium: Boothferry Park; Attendance: 2,800; Referee: Reg Matthewson

29 May 1977 Friendly	Scotland	2–1	England	Dundee, Scotland
	Creamer; Blagojević		Lopez (pen.)	Stadium: Downfield Park; Attendance: 1,000; Referee: J Morrison

18 September 1977 Queen's Silver Jubilee International	England	5–0	Wales	Warminster, England
	Parker; Lopez (pen.); Badrock; Day; Foreman			Stadium: Weymouth Street; Attendance: 1,600

15 November 1977 Friendly	England	1–0	Italy	Wimbledon, England
	Parker 8'			Stadium: Plough Lane; Referee: Reynolds
Note: Game consisted of two 40-minute halves.

=== 1978 ===
2 May 1978 Friendly	England	6–1	Republic of Ireland	Exeter, England
	Lopez; Foreman; Day; Dobb (pen.)	Report	Hynes (pen.)	Stadium: St James Park

30 September 1978 Friendly	Netherlands	3–1	England	Vlissingen, Netherlands
	van Hoof 30', 65'; Manuputty 50'		Chapman 60'	Stadium: Sportpark Irislaan; Attendance: 1,000; Referee: GHH van der Linden

31 October 1978 Friendly	England	3–0	Belgium	Southampton, England
	Badrock; Curl			Stadium: The Dell; Attendance: 5,471; Referee: Clive White

=== 1979 ===
19 May 1979 Friendly	Denmark	3–1	England	Copenhagen, Denmark
	Barsballe; Holst; Larsen		?	Stadium: Hvidovre Stadium; Attendance: 480; Referee: Jørgen Mortensen

19 July 1979 1979 European Competition Group B	England	3–1	Finland	Sorrento, Italy
	Chapman; ?		Kaasinen

23 July 1979 1979 European Competition Group B	England	2–0	Switzerland	Sorrento, Italy
	Parker; ?

25 July 1979 1979 European Competition semi-final	Italy	3–1	England	Naples, Italy
	Vignotto 11', 65'; Musumeci 70'	FIGC Report (in Italian)	Curl 49'	Stadium: Stadio San Paolo

27 July 1979 1979 European Competition 3rd place	Sweden	0–0 (a.e.t.) (4 – 3 p)	England	Scafati, Italy (Note: The Swedish Football Association list of matches says this game took place in Naples. Sue Lopez's book Women on the Ball suggests nearby Scafati.)
	Penalties
	Lindqvist (penalty scored); Börjesson (penalty scored); Åhman (penalty scored); Söderström (penalty missed); Arnesson (penalty scored)		Wiseman (penalty scored); ? (penalty missed); Curl (penalty scored); ? (penalty missed); Lopez (penalty scored)
Note: Extra time was of twenty minutes' duration.

13 September 1979 Friendly	England	2–2	Denmark	Kingston-upon-Hull, England
	Riggelsen (o.g.); Foreman		Nielsen; Niemann	Stadium: Boothferry Park; Attendance: 1,100; Referee: George Courtney

== Sources ==
- "Match Results England Women – 1970–1990". England Football Online. Archived from the original on 26 January 2025.
