= 1972 Scotland v England women's football match =

- Event: International friendly
Scotland	England
(Scotland)	(England)
2	3
- Date: 18 November 1972
- Venue: Ravenscraig Stadium, Greenock
- Referee: Mr. J. McClelland (Scotland)
- Attendance: 400
- Weather: Snow

Scotland Women v England Women (1972) was the first ever official international women's football match to be played in Great Britain. It was contested by the national teams of Scotland and England. The match took place on 18 November 1972 at Ravenscraig Stadium in Greenock, Scotland. England won the game 3–2, almost exactly a hundred years after the first men's international between the two nations. It was the second international women's match to be granted official status by FIFA, after a meeting between France and Netherlands in April 1971.

== Background ==
Previous matches

Representative women's fixtures between teams from Scotland and England had taken place much earlier. In May 1881 a touring English team played two fixtures against local opposition in Edinburgh and Glasgow. The second game, before 5,000 spectators at Shawfield Stadium, resulted in a riot. In March 1918 Celtic Park hosted a match between female teams of munitions workers. Vickers-Armstrongs from Barrow, beat William Beardmore and Company from Glasgow 4–0, with proceeds donated to hospitals caring for wounded soldiers from World War I. A return fixture in Barrow three weeks later finished 2–2, in front of 5,000 fans. In 1920 Dick, Kerr's Ladies beat a Scottish XI 22–0. A return fixture at Celtic Park the following year finished 9–0 to the English team, watched by a crowd of 6,000. Dick, Kerr's then undertook a tour of Scotland; playing in Edinburgh, Kilmarnock, Aberdeen, Dundee and Dumfries to an aggregate crowd of 70,000.

Treatment of women's football in Scotland

In 1972 the SFA was resisting pressure from UEFA to take over the administration of women's football. In 1971 the European member associations had voted 39–1 in favour of UEFA's motion that they take control of women's football, with Scotland voting against. In Scotland football was traditionally seen as a working class, male preserve. A 1921 ban on women's football was not lifted until 1974 and it was not until 1998 that the SFA assumed ultimate responsibility for Scottish women's football.

Wendy Owen reported that the hotel in Gourock where England stayed required its female guests to wear skirts at all times: "this didn't go down too well with the players, most of whom, like me, were never out of trousers. I didn't even possess a dress or skirt and had to go out and buy one before I joined the tour."

== Teams ==
England's defensive midfielder was 17-year-old Janet Bagguley of Macclesfield Ladies, described by Wendy Owen as "hard as nails and a ferocious tackler". Team captain Sheila Parker (née Porter) was a 24-year-old centre half.

== Venue ==
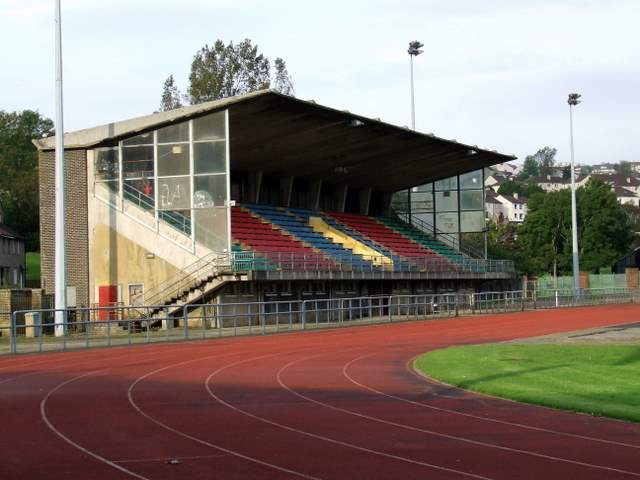
Ravenscraig Stadium

The match was staged in Greenock at Ravenscraig Stadium, primarily an athletics facility, because a Scottish Football Association (SFA) resolution dating from the 1920s was still in place. This banned women footballers from SFA-affiliated grounds. For the same reason the referee and linesmen were sourced from the Scottish Football Referees Association instead of via the SFA. The English FA had rescinded their own similar ban in January 1970.

== The match ==
Wendy Owen was "bitterly disappointed" to be named amongst the substitutes and watched the game from underneath a blanket on the substitute's bench. The match was played in icy conditions which gave way to heavy snow during the second half. Sylvia Gore recalled that: "There was only one other game played in Scotland that day – a men's game – because the conditions were so bad." A "close and exciting" game saw Scotland leading 2–1 at half time but England recovering to win 3–2. Scotland took the lead with a goal from Mary Carr. Rose Reilly then scored direct from a corner to put Scotland 2–0 ahead. During the first half Gore made history by scoring England's first ever goal in an official international:

I picked up the ball in my own area and ran 40 yards. I thought I would slip over but I stayed on my feet and side-footed the ball past the keeper.

As conditions deteriorated in the second half, England scored twice more without reply. Wendy Owen reported that Gore scored again and Pat Davies got one, while Sue Lopez credited Davies with both England's second half goals. The English and Scottish FAs report England's goals came from Gore, Lynda Hale, and Jeannie Allot.

== Match details ==
18 November 1972
14:15 GMT

Scotland	2 – 3	England
Carr 20'; Reilly 27'	Report	Gore 37'; Hale 57'; Allott 73'

Ravenscraig Stadium, Greenock
Attendance: 400
Referee: Mr. J. McClelland (Glasgow)

Scotland	England

GK	Janie Houghton
RB	Jean Hunter
LB	June Hunter
RH	Linda Kidd
CH	Marian Mount
LH	Sandra Walker
OR	Rose Reilly
IR	Edna Neillis
CF	Mary Anderson
IL	Margaret McAuley (c)	(substituted off) 47'
OL	Mary Carr
Substitutes:
GK	Liz Creamer
DF	Mary Davenport
FW	Linda Cooper
FW	Diane McLaren	(substituted on) 47'
DF	Irene Morrison
Manager:
(Scotland) Rab Stewart

GK	Sue Buckett
RB	Morag Kirkland
LB	Sandra Graham
RH	Janet Bagguley
CH	Sheila Parker (c)
LH	Paddy McGroarty
OR	Lynda Hale
IR	Sylvia Gore
CF	Pat Davies
IL	Jeannie Allott
OL	Jean Wilson
Substitutes:
GK	Susan Whyatt
DF	Wendy Owen
DF	Julia Manning
FW	Eileen Foreman
Manager:
(England) Eric Worthington

Assistant referees:
(Scotland) Mr. D. Munro (East Kilbride)
(Scotland) Mr. J. Gibb (East Kilbride)

== Subsequent matches ==
England has competed against Scotland most notably since 1972 in matches in 2019 FIFA World Cup and Euro 2017.

== Record ==
The full record between the two countries is as follows:

Competition	Played	Results			Goals	
Competition	Played	Scotland	England	Draw	Scotland	England
Friendly	12	1	11	0	5	43
British Home Championship	1	0	1	0	1	5
UEFA Championship qualifiers	6	0	6	0	1	16
Algarve Cup	1	0	1	0	1	4
Cyprus Cup	2	1	1	0	2	3
TOTAL	22	2	20	0	10	71

== Bibliography ==
- Caudwell, Jayne (2007). "Women's Football in Scotland: An Historical Overview". In Magee, Jonathan; Caudwell, Jayne; Liston, Katie; Scraton, Sheila (eds.). Women, Football and Europe: Histories, Equity and Experiences. Vol. 1. Mayer and Mayer. ISBN 978-1841262253.
- Lopez, Sue (1997). Women on the Ball: A Guide to Women's Football. London, England: Scarlet Press. ISBN 1857270169.
- Owen, Wendy (2005). Kicking Against Tradition: A Career in Women's Football. Tempus. ISBN 0752434276.
