= Manuputty =

Manuputty is a Moluccan surname. Notable people with the surname include:

- Bellaetrix Manuputty (born 1988), Indonesian badminton player
- Cassiopeia Manuputty (born 1994), Indonesian basketball player
- Elly Manuputty
