= Christine Hutchinson =

Christine Hutchinson may refer to:

- Christine Hutchinson (entertainer)
- Christine Hutchinson (footballer)
