= Janet Bagguley =

English footballer

Personal information
- Full name: Janet Elizabeth Clark
- Date of birth: 5 May 1955 (age 71)
- Place of birth: Buxton, England
- Position: Midfielder

Senior career*
Years	Team	Apps	(Gls)
- Macclesfield Ladies

International career
1972-1976	England	11	(0)
- * Club domestic league appearances and goals

Janet Clark (née Bagguley) is a former England women's international footballer. After retiring from football Bagguley became a postwoman.

== Club career ==
As a teenager, Bagguley joined Macclesfield Ladies, where she was known as the 'female Nobby Stiles' for her aggressive play. Bagguley was described by England teammate Wendy Owen as "hard as nails and a ferocious tackler".

She eventually gave up football as she couldn't get enough time off work to keep playing while also pursuing other interests.

== International career ==
Bagguley made her first appearance for England in their first ever official match. England played against Scotland on 18 November 1972 in Greenock, winning 3–2. Bagguley represented England 11 times.

== After football ==
After her football career, Bagguley became a Royal Mail postwoman. In 2025 she was the face of the 'Lioness Letters' initiative, through which she travelled around England with a special postbox collecting letters of support for the current England women's squad ahead of their UEFA Women's Euro 2025 campaign. She remains close friends with former Macclesfield and England teammate Sue Whyatt.

== Bibliography ==
- Owen, Wendy (2005). Kicking Against Tradition: A Career in Women's Football. Tempus. ISBN 0752434276.
