= Sue Whyatt =

English footballer

Personal information
- Full name: Susan Whyatt
- Place of birth: Macclesfield, England
- Position: Goalkeeper

Senior career*
Years	Team	Apps	(Gls)
1971-74	Macclesfield Ladies		

International career
1973	England	1	(0)
- * Club domestic league appearances and goals

Sue Whyatt is an English former footballer who played as a goalkeeper for England and Macclesfield Ladies. She was part of the squad for England's first ever official international match against Scotland in 1972.

== Early life ==
Whyatt was born in Macclesfield and started playing football after the 1966 FIFA World Cup, joining other local children playing in the road. She has said that the boys in her street needed a goalkeeper who would "dive on the tarmac". She was particularly inspired by England goalkeeper Gordon Banks and later had the opportunity to meet him, crediting him for words of advice that helped her earn a spot in the England team.

== Club career ==
Unable to play competitive football with the boys at school, Whyatt discovered Macclesfield Ladies and went for a trial, after which she began playing for the team.

== International career ==
Following the lifting of the Football Association's ban on women's football, Whyatt tried out for the first official England team, succeeding at county, regional and national level before being selected for the squad.

Whyatt was an unused substitute in England's first ever official international which was played against Scotland at Ravenscraig Stadium in Greenock. Whyatt made her only appearance for England against Scotland on 23 June 1973, in England's 8–0 win at Manor Park, Nuneaton. She came on as a second-half substitute in the 64th minute. Although she only made one international appearance, she was included in several squads as the reserve goalkeeper and travelled across Europe with the England team.

== After football ==
Whyatt became a police officer in 1974. Initially she was assured that the police force would give her time off to play and train, but this proved difficult and she was forced to give up football. She later became the first female police dog handler in her county.

In 2022, Whyatt kickstarted a campaign for the FA to give legacy caps to all former Lionesses. In November 2022, Whyatt was recognized by The Football Association as one of the England national team's legacy players, and as the 17th women's player to be capped by England. She was among a group of former players invited to watch the current squad in training ahead of a match dedicated to the 50th anniversary of the England women's team.
