= Greenock Juniors F.C. =

Association football club in Inverclyde, Scotland

Greenock Juniors
- Full name: Greenock Juniors Football Club
- Founded: 1956
- Ground: Ravenscraig Stadium, Greenock
- Coordinates: 55°56′24″N 4°48′47″W
- Chairman: Tommy Sutherland
- Manager: Gary Fleming
- League: West of Scotland League Second Division
- 2025–26: West of Scotland League Second Division, 11th of 16
Home colours	Away colours

Greenock Juniors Football Club are a Scottish football club based in Greenock, Inverclyde. They compete in West of Scotland League Second Division and play home matches at Ravenscraig Stadium, on Auchmead Road - a five-minute walk from Branchton railway station. The club were decanted for a short period of time as the Stadium received multi-million pound upgrades in preparation for the 2014 Commonwealth Games.

== History ==
In season 1959–60 Greenock made their only appearance in the final of the Scottish Junior Cup. They were beaten 3–1 by St Andrews United at Hampden Park, Glasgow in front of a crowd of 34,603. Their quarter-final tie against Johnstone Burgh earlier in the competition attracted a record attendance of 8,000 to Ravenscraig Stadium.

In June 2017, former player Thomas Molloy was appointed as manager, assisted by former Kilmarnock FC and Greenock Morton Central Defender Shaun Dillon, Owen Archdeacon and goalkeeping coach Gavin Pick. Thomas and his management team left the club in the summer of 2021 to join West of Scotland Premier League team, Kilbirnie Ladeside.

In September 2021, former Kirkintiloch Rob Roy coach, John Doyle was appointed as Manager. His tenure was short, leaving 4 months later for the First Team Managers role at Division One side, St Cadocs.

In January 2022, following a period of instability, former Goalkeeper, Ian Nixon, was appointed as Club Manager. Assisted by staff, Derrick McMillan, Ross Holland and Kenny McLachlan, formerly of Beith Juniors FC, he secured qualification to the Second Division with an 8th-placed finish in Conference B, of the West of Scotland Football Leagues 2021/22 season.

Scottish actor Martin Compston briefly played for the club following his release from Greenock Morton.

== Honours ==
- Central League Championship winners: 1960–61, 1965–66
- Central League Division Two winners: 1997–98
- Central League Cup winners: 1960–61, 1965–66, 1966–67
- Pompey Cup winners: 1965–66
- Renfrewshire Junior Cup winners: 1959–60, 1960–61, 1962–63, 1963–64, 1966–67
- Erskine Hospital Charity Cup winners: 1959–60
- West Central League First Division winners: 2013
