= Jo Fletcher =

English footballer (born 1980)

Personal information
- Full name: Josephine Julia Fletcher
- Date of birth: 31 December 1980 (age 45)
- Place of birth: Chester, England
- Height: 5 ft 8 in (1.73 m)
- Position: Goalkeeper

Team information
- Current team: Watford

Youth career
- Tranmere Rovers

College career
Years	Team	Apps	(Gls)
1999–2000	Kentucky Wildcats		
2001–2002	Oregon State Beavers	39	(0)

Senior career*
Years	Team	Apps	(Gls)
1997–1998	Everton		
1998–1999	Liverpool		
2002–2003	Tranmere Rovers	22	(1)
2003–2004	Doncaster Rovers Belles		
2004–2006	Birmingham City		
2006–2007	Charlton Athletic		
2009	Lincoln	1	(0)
2017–	Watford		

International career^{‡}
2005	England	9	(0)
- * Club domestic league appearances and goals ‡ National team caps and goals as of 11:13, 15 September 2009 (UTC)

Josephine Julia Fletcher (born 31 December 1980) is an English footballer who plays as a goalkeeper for Watford. She played at full international level for England. She hails from Malpas, Cheshire and attended Bishop Heber High School.

== Club career ==
Fletcher joined Tranmere Rovers Ladies as an under–18 player. In summer 1998 she left FA Women's Premier League champions Everton for local rivals Liverpool.

Fletcher spent the US 2001 and 2002 seasons playing for Oregon State in the Pac-10 league, playing 39 times In January 2003 she was selected as available to be drafted at the 2003 Women's United Soccer Association player draft.

On returning to England, she re-joined Tranmere Rovers Ladies, where she was coached by Tranmere Rovers' keeper John Achterberg. She moved on to Doncaster Rovers Belles, leaving them to join Birmingham City in June 2004. She left City on joining the Army in 2005, but returned after initial training in October 2005.

In the 2006 close season, Fletcher joined Charlton Athletic Ladies.

But she later made a single appearance for OOH Lincoln Ladies in October 2009, deputising for Kay Hawke who was suspended.

Fletcher signed for Watford in March 2017.

== International career ==
Fletcher played at junior level for England and made her senior debut in February 2005, against Italy. She played eight further games for England, the last being against Denmark in June the same year, having been included in the Euro 2005 Squad. She played in place of the injured Rachel Brown at the start of the tournament, but was replaced by Brown on her return from injury. Her international career effectively ended when she joined an Army Officer Training Scheme, although she was later selected for a training squad.

Fletcher was allotted 158 when the FA announced their legacy numbers scheme to honour the 50th anniversary of England's inaugural international.

== Personal life ==
Fletcher, a Sheffield Wednesday fan, majored in Biology at Oregon State University, having transferred from the University of Kentucky, both times on football scholarships. She returned to the UK after graduating and briefly worked for a pharmaceutical company before joining the Royal Military Academy where she marched in Prince Harry's commissioning parade. In 2005, she graduated with an MSc in Exercise Science and Nutrition from the University of Chester. Her mentor while at Chester was Wendy Owen who had played in England's first national women's football team.
