= England women's national football team results (2000–2009) =

- Win Draw Loss

This is a list of the England women's national football team results from 2000 to 2009.

== Results ==
=== 2000 ===
20 February 2000 Euro 2001 qualifying	England	2–0	Portugal	Barnsley, England
	S. Smith 23'; Walker 30'	Report		Stadium: Oakwell; Attendance: 5,114; Referee: Maria Trampusch (Austria)

7 March 2000 Euro 2001 qualifying	England	0–3	Norway	Norwich, England
		Report	Pettersen 1'; Kvitland 33'; Rapp-Ødegaard 45'	Stadium: Carrow Road; Attendance: 5,142; Referee: Claudine Brohet (Belgium)

22 April 2000 Euro 2001 qualifying	Portugal	2–2	England	Sacavém, Portugal
	Couto 7'; Sequeira 57'	Report	Burke 40'; S. Smith 79'	Stadium: Campo do Sacavenense; Referee: Geja Mulder (Netherlands)

13 May 2000 Euro 2001 qualifying	England	1–0	Switzerland	Bristol, England
	S. Smith			Stadium: Memorial Stadium; Attendance: 5,900

4 June 2000 Euro 2001 qualifying	Norway	8–0	England	Moss, Norway
	Mellgren 5', 61'; Rapp-Ødegaard 17', 63'; Pettersen 32', 72', 82'; S. Gulbrandsen 42'	Report		Stadium: Melløs Stadion; Referee: Maria Jose Alcantara Negrin (Spain)

16 August 2000 Friendly	France	1–0	England	Marseille, France
	Zenoni 5'	Report		Stadium: Stade Vélodrome; Attendance: 60,000; Referee: Katriina Elovirta (Finland)

28 September 2000 Friendly	England	2–1	Finland	Leyton, England
				Stadium: Brisbane Road

30 October 2000 Euro 2001 qualifying playoff first leg	Ukraine	1–2	England	Boryspil, Ukraine
	Zinchenko	Report	K. Smith; Walker	Stadium: Kolos Stadium; Referee: Bente Ovedie Skogvang (Norway)

28 November 2000 Euro 2001 qualifying playoff second leg	England	2–0 (4–1 agg.)	Ukraine	Leyton, England
	S. Smith; Yankey	Report		Stadium: Brisbane Road; Attendance: 7,102; Referee: Sabrina Rinaldi (Italy)

=== 2001 ===
22 March 2001 Friendly	England	4–2	Spain	Luton, England
	K. Smith 18'; S. Smith 35', 67', 76'	Report	Gurrutxaga 12'; Ferré 62'	Stadium: Kenilworth Road; Attendance: 3,602; Referee: Elke Gunthner (Germany)

27 May 2001 Friendly	England	1–0	Scotland	Bolton, England
	Banks 44'	Report		Stadium: Reebok Stadium; Attendance: 3,004; Referee: Ceri Richards (Wales)

24 June 2001 Euro 2001 group stage	Russia	1–1	England	Jena, Germany
	Svetlitskaya 62'	Report	Banks 45'	Stadium: Ernst-Abbe-Sportfeld; Attendance: 1,253; Referee: Rita Ruiz Tacoronte (Spain)

27 June 2001 Euro 2001 group stage	Sweden	4–0	England	Jena, Germany
	Törnqvist 3'; Bengtsson 26'; Ljungberg 75'; Eriksson 80'	Report		Stadium: Ernst-Abbe-Sportfeld; Attendance: 1,000; Referee: Claudine Brohet (Belgium)

30 June 2001 Euro 2001 group stage	England	0–3	Germany	Jena, Germany
		Report	Wimbersky 57'; Wiegmann 65'; Lingor 67'	Stadium: Ernst-Abbe-Sportfeld; Attendance: 11,312; Referee: Bente Ovedie Skogvang (Norway)

23 August 2001 Friendly	England	0–3	Denmark	Northampton, England
			Jokumsen; Pedersen; Jensen	Stadium: Sixfields Stadium; Attendance: 2,902

27 September 2001 2003 World Cup qualifying	Germany	3–1	England	Kassel, Germany
	M.Müller 3'; Smisek 7', 11'	Report	Yankey 49'	Stadium: Auestadion; Referee: Vibeke Karlsen (Norway)

4 November 2001 2003 World Cup qualifying	England	0–0	Netherlands	Cleethorpes, England
		Report		Stadium: Blundell Park; Attendance: 4,130; Referee: Katriina Elovirta (Finland)

24 November 2001 2003 World Cup qualifying	Portugal	1–1	England	Gafanha da Nazaré, Portugal
	Anabela 5'	Report	Walker 38'	Stadium: Complexo Desportivo; Referee: Claudine Brohet (Belgium)

=== 2002 ===
25 January 2002 Friendly	England	0–5	Sweden	La Manga, Spain
		Report	Moström 8'; Sjögran 18'; Ljungberg 26'; Olsson 47'; Andersson 65'	Stadium: La Manga Stadium

24 February 2002 2003 World Cup qualifying	England	3–0	Portugal	Portsmouth, England
	Williams 20'; Smith 58', 60'	Report		Stadium: Fratton Park; Attendance: 8,821; Referee: Anri Hänninen (Finland)

1 March 2002 2002 Algarve Cup group	Norway	3–1	England	Ferreiras, Portugal
	Mellgren 8'; Tønnessen 33'; Riise 79'	Report	Banks 18'

3 March 2002 2002 Algarve Cup group	United States	2–0	England	Ferreiras, Portugal
	MacMillan 58'; Wilson 75'	Report

5 March 2002 2002 Algarve Cup group	England	3–6	Sweden	Lagos, Portugal
	Walker 47', 53'; Barr 88'	Report	Sjögran 7', 41'; Flyborg 8'; Ljungberg 69'; Björn 79', 89'

7 March 2002 2002 Algarve Cup 9th	England	4–1	Scotland	Quarteira, Portugal
	Walker; Exley 42'; Williams; Burke 70'	Report	Cook 25'

23 March 2002 2003 World Cup qualifying	Netherlands	1–4	England	The Hague, Netherlands
	Kiesel-Griffioen 55'	Report	Chapman 16'; Burke 24'; Smith 73'; Walker 89'	Stadium: Zuiderpark Stadion

19 May 2002 2003 World Cup qualifying	England	0–1	Germany	London, England
			Gottschlich 41'	Stadium: Selhurst Park; Attendance: 14,107; Referee: Sabrina Rindali (Italy)

23 July 2002 Friendly	England	0–1	Nigeria	Norwich, England
		Report	Avre	Stadium: Carrow Road

16 September 2002 2003 World Cup qualifying playoff semi-final first leg	Iceland	2–2	England	Reykjavík, Iceland
	Færseth 42'; Hendriksdóttir 56'	Report	Walker 44', 88'	Stadium: Laugardalsvöllur; Attendance: 2,974; Referee: Katriina Elovirta (Finland)

22 September 2002 2003 World Cup qualifying playoff semi-final second leg	England	1–0 (3–2 agg.)	Iceland	Birmingham, England
	Barr 87'	Report		Stadium: St Andrew's; Attendance: 3,442; Referee: Ingrid Jonsson (Sweden)

17 October 2002 2003 World Cup qualifying playoff final first leg	England	0–1	France	London, England
		Report	Pichon 75'	Stadium: Selhurst Park; Attendance: 6,200; Referee: Vibeke Karlsen (Norway)

16 November 2002 2003 World Cup qualifying playoff final second leg	France	1–0 (2–0 agg.)	England	Saint-Étienne, France
	Diacre 54'	Report		Stadium: Stade Geoffroy-Guichard; Attendance: 23,680; Referee: Nicole Petignat (Switzerland)

=== 2003 ===
24 February 2003 Friendly	Italy	1–0	England	Viareggio, Italy
	Mazzoni			Stadium: Stadio dei Pini

16 May 2003 Friendly	United States	6–0	England	Birmingham, Alabama
	Hamm 31'; Parlow 43', 45', 51', 56'; Milbrett 70'	Report		Stadium: Legion Field

19 May 2003 Friendly	Canada	4–0	England	Montreal, Canada
	Neil; Lang	Report		Stadium: Soccerplexe Catalogna; Attendance: 2,500

22 May 2003 Friendly	Canada	4–0	England	Ottawa, Canada
	Neil; Latham; Lang			Stadium: Frank Clair Stadium; Attendance: 19,000

4 September 2003 Friendly	England	1–0	Australia	Burnley, England
	Yankey	Report		Stadium: Turf Moor; Attendance: 4,349

11 September 2003 Friendly	Germany	4–0	England	Darmstadt, Germany
	Lingor; Wiegmann; Prinz	Report		Stadium: Stadion am Böllenfalltor; Referee: 5,870

20 October 2003 Friendly	Russia	2–2	England	Moscow, Russia
				Stadium: Kryoia Soveto

14 November 2003 Friendly	England	5–0	Scotland	Preston, England
	Barr; F. White; Williams; Johnstone (o.g.)			Stadium: Deepdale

=== 2004 ===
19 February 2004 Friendly	England	2–0	Denmark	Portsmouth, England
	Cederkvist 73' (o.g.); Smith 84' (pen.)	Report		Stadium: Fratton Park; Attendance: 8,157

22 April 2004 Friendly	England	0–3	Nigeria	Reading, England
		Report	Nwadike 24'; Nkwocha 65', 85'	Stadium: Madejski Stadium; Attendance: 4,089

14 May 2004 Friendly	England	1–0	Iceland	Peterborough, England
	Williams 40'	Report		Stadium: London Road; Attendance: 2,762

19 August 2004 Friendly	England	1–2	Russia	Bristol, England
	Williams 67'	Report	Barbachina 70', 90+1'	Stadium: Memorial Stadium; Attendance: 1,439; Referee: Hilda McDermott (Ireland)

18 September 2004 Friendly	Netherlands	1–2	England	Heerhugowaard, Netherlands
	Smit 37'	Report	Exley 45+3'; Barr 63'	Stadium: Sportpark de Wending; Referee: Harry van Hatten (Netherlands)

22 September 2004 Friendly	Netherlands	0–1	England	Tuitjenhorn, Netherlands
		Report	Unitt 67'	Stadium: Sportcomplex Hollandia; Attendance: 800; Referee: Fred Gerritsen (Netherlands)

=== 2005 ===
17 February 2005 Friendly	England	4–1	Italy	Milton Keynes, England
	Williams 9'; Handley 24'; Barr 36'; Carney 65'	Report	Damiana 80'	Stadium: National Hockey Stadium; Attendance: 6,546

9 March 2005 2005 Algarve Cup group	England	4–0	Northern Ireland	Paderne, Portugal
	Carney 32'; Exley 53', 89'; McArthur 56'	Report		Stadium: Estadio Municipal

11 March 2005 2005 Algarve Cup group	Portugal	0–4	England	Faro, Portugal
		Report	Stoney 10'; Yankey 30', 90'; Barr 77'	Stadium: Estádio de São Luís; Referee: Eun ah Hong

13 March 2005 2005 Algarve Cup group	England	5–0	Mexico	Lagos, Portugal
	Williams 2', 68'; Handley 34'; Yankey 52'; Smith 78'	Report		Stadium: Estadio Municipal

15 March 2005 2005 Algarve Cup 7th	China	0–0 (5–3 p)	England	Guia, Portugal
		Report		Stadium: Complexo Desportivo Arsénio Catuna

21 April 2005 Friendly	England	2–1	Scotland	Birkenhead, England
		Report		Stadium: Prenton Park

6 May 2005 Friendly	England	1–0	Norway	Barnsley, England
	Asante	Report		Stadium: Oakwell

26 May 2005 Friendly	England	4–1	Czech Republic	Walsall, England
	Unitt; Smith; Aluko	Report	Chlumeka	Stadium: Bescot Stadium; Attendance: 6,869

5 June 2005 Euro 2005 group stage	England	3–2	Finland	Manchester, England
	Valkonen 18' (o.g.); Barr 40'; Carney 90+1'	Report	Rantanen 56'; Kalmari 88'	Stadium: City of Manchester Stadium; Attendance: 29,092; Referee: Gyöngyi Gaál (Hungary)

8 June 2005 Euro 2005 group stage	England	1–2	Denmark	Blackburn, England
	Williams 52' (pen.)	Report	M. Pedersen 80'; Sørensen 88'	Stadium: Ewood Park; Attendance: 14,695; Referee: Alexandra Ihringová (Slovakia)

11 June 2005 Euro 2005 group stage	England	0–1	Sweden	Blackburn, England
		Report	Sjöström 3'	Stadium: Ewood Park; Attendance: 25,694; Referee: Nicole Petignat (Switzerland)

1 September 2005 2007 World Cup qualifying	Austria	1–4	England	Amstetten, Austria
	Celouch 21'	Report	Williams 23' (pen.); K. Smith 35'; Barr 56'; S. Smith 90+2'	Stadium: Ertl Glas Stadion; Referee: Ausra Tvarijonaite (Lithuania)

27 October 2005 2007 World Cup qualifying	Hungary	0–13	England	Tapolca, Hungary
		Report	K. Smith 3', 43', 80'; Yankey 5'; Aluko 12', 50'; Scott 15', 38'; Chapman 30'; Williams 61', 88' (pen.); Potter 75'; Handley 79'	Stadium: Tapolcia Stadium; Referee: Dagmar Damkova (Czech Republic)

17 November 2005 2007 World Cup qualifying	Netherlands	0–1	England	Zwolle, Netherlands
		Report	Williams 55' (pen.)	Stadium: Oosterenk; Referee: Christine Frai (Germany)

=== 2006 ===
7 February 2006 Friendly	England	0–0	Sweden	Larnaca, Cyprus
		Report		Stadium: GSZ Stadium

9 February 2006 Friendly	England	1–1	Sweden	Achna, Cyprus
	Goal	Report	Aronsson	Stadium: Dasaki Stadium

9 March 2006 Friendly	England	1–0	Iceland	Norwich, England
	Carney	Report		Stadium: Carrow Road

26 March 2006 2007 World Cup qualifying	England	0–0	France	Blackburn, England
		Report		Stadium: Ewood Park; Attendance: 12,164; Referee: Bente Skogvang (Norway)

20 April 2006 2007 World Cup qualifying	England	4–0	Austria	Gillingham, England
	Spieler 36' (o.g.); Williams 85'; S. Smith 87'; Handley 90+2'	Report		Stadium: Priestfield Stadium; Attendance: 8,068; Referee: Snjezana Fodic (Croatia)

11 May 2006 2007 World Cup qualifying	England	2–0	Hungary	Southampton, England
	Exley 40'; A. Scott 90+1'	Report		Stadium: St Mary's Stadium; Attendance: 8,817; Referee: Lena Arwedahl (Sweden)

31 August 2006 2007 World Cup qualifying	England	4–0	Netherlands	Charlton, England
	K. Smith 9', 24' (pen.), 65'; Yankey 67'	Report		Stadium: The Valley; Attendance: 7,931; Referee: Floarea Cristina Ionescu (Romania)

30 September 2006 2007 World Cup qualifying	France	1–1	England	Rennes, France
	Diguelman 88'	Report	Lattaf 63' (o.g.)	Stadium: Stade de la Route de Lorient; Attendance: 19,215; Referee: Jenny Palmqvist (Sweden)

23 October 2006 Friendly	Germany	5–1	England	Aalen, Germany
	Stegemann; Smisek; Prinz; Šašić; Müller	Report	A. Scott	Stadium: Städtisches Waldstadion; Attendance: 11,200; Referee: Christine Baitinger (Germany)

=== 2007 ===
26 January 2007 2007 Four Nations	China	2–0	England	Guangzhou, China
	Zhang 4'; Han 45'			Stadium: Guangdong Olympic Stadium

28 January 2007 2007 Four Nations	United States	1–1	England	Guangzhou, China
	O'Reilly 17'	Report	A. Scott 47'	Stadium: Guangdong Olympic Stadium; Attendance: 3,000; Referee: Bibiana Steinhaus (Germany)

30 January 2007 2007 Four Nations	England	0–0	Germany	Guangzhou, China
				Stadium: Guangdong Olympic Stadium

7 March 2007 Friendly	England	6–0	Russia	Milton Keynes, England
	A. Scott; Aluko; Carney; K. Smith; Yankey; Stoney	Report		Stadium: Stadium MK; Attendance: 5,421; Referee: Saša Ihringová (Slovakia)

11 March 2007 Friendly	England	1–0	Scotland	Wycombe, England
	Williams 30'	Report		Stadium: Adams Park; Attendance: 2,066

14 March 2007 Friendly	England	0–1	Netherlands	Swindon, England
		Report	Melis	Stadium: The County Ground; Attendance: 6,000

13 May 2007 Euro 2009 qualifying	England	4–0	Northern Ireland	Gillingham, England
	K. Smith 52'; Harkin 66' (o.g.); Chapman 73'; Sanderson 77'	Report		Stadium: Priestfield; Attendance: 3,944; Referee: Ann Helen Østervold (Norway)

16 May 2007 Friendly	England	4–0	Iceland	Southend, England
	Yankey 23'; Chapman 45+1'; K. Smith 64'; Chapman 69'			Stadium: Roots Hall

11 September 2007 2007 World Cup group stage	England	2–2	Japan	Shanghai, China
	K. Smith 81', 83'	Report	Miyama 55', 90+5'	Stadium: Hongkou Stadium; Attendance: 27,146; Referee: Kari Seitz (United States)

14 September 2007 2007 World Cup group stage	Germany	0–0	England	Shanghai, China
		Report		Stadium: Hongkou Stadium; Attendance: 27,730; Referee: Jenny Palmqvist (Sweden)

17 September 2007 2007 World Cup group stage	Argentina	1–6	England	Chengdu, China
	González 60'	Report	González 9' (o.g.); J. Scott 10'; Williams 50' (pen.); K. Smith 64', 77'; Exley 90' (pen.)	Stadium: Chengdu Sports Center; Attendance: 30,730; Referee: Dianne Ferreira-James (Guyana)

22 September 2007 2007 World Cup quarter-final	United States	3–0	England	Tianjin, China
	Wambach 48'; Boxx 57'; Lilly 60'	Report		Stadium: Tianjin Olympic Centre Stadium; Attendance: 29,586; Referee: Jenny Palmqvist (Sweden)

27 October 2007 Euro 2009 qualifying	England	4–0	Belarus	Walsall, England
	A. Scott 10', 64'; K. Smith 32'; Aluko 48'	Report		Stadium: Bescot Stadium; Attendance: 8,632; Referee: Marylin Remy (France)

25 November 2007 Euro 2009 qualifying	England	1–0	Spain	Shrewsbury, England
	Carney 64'	Report		Stadium: New Meadow; Attendance: 8,753; Referee: Claudine Brohet (Belgium)

=== 2008 ===
12 February 2008 Friendly	England	0–2	Sweden	Larnaca, Cyprus
		Report	Schelin	Stadium: GSZ Stadium

14 February 2008 Friendly	Norway	1–2	England	Larnaca, Cyprus
	Stensland	Report	Williams; K. Smith	Stadium: GSZ Stadium

6 March 2008 Euro 2009 qualifying	Northern Ireland	0–2	England	Lurgan, Northern Ireland
		Report	Williams 18'; White 84'	Stadium: Mourneview Park; Referee: Silvia Tea Spinelli (Italy)

20 March 2008 Euro 2009 qualifying	England	0–0	Czech Republic	Doncaster, England
		Report		Stadium: Keepmoat Stadium; Referee: Eva Ödlund (Sweden)

8 May 2008 Euro 2009 qualifying	Belarus	1–6	England	Minsk, Belarus
	Ryzhevich 30'	Report	J. Scott 1'; Williams 7', 25', 87'; Sanderson 44'; White 90'	Stadium: Darida Stadium; Referee: Cristina Dorcioman (Romania)

17 July 2008 Friendly	Germany	3–0	England	Unterhaching, Germany
	Smisek; Prinz; Behringer	Report		Stadium: Generali Sportpark; Attendance: 9,185; Referee: Christine Baitinger (Germany)

28 September 2008 Euro 2009 qualifying	Czech Republic	1–5	England	Prague, Czech Republic
	Došková 28'	Report	Westwood 61'; K. Smith 79', 86'; Carney 81'; J. Scott 83'	Stadium: Ďolíček Stadion; Referee: Christine Baitinger (Germany)

2 October 2008 Euro 2009 qualifying	Spain	2–2	England	Zamora, Spain
	Boquete 8'; Bermúdez 42'	Report	Carney 54'; K. Smith 76'	Stadium: Estadio Ruta de la Plata; Referee: Jenny Palmqvist (Sweden)

=== 2009 ===
9 February 2009 Friendly	England	2–2	Finland	Larnaca, Cyprus
		Report		Stadium: Alpha Sports Centre

11 February 2009 Friendly	England	4–1	Finland	Larnaca, Cyprus
		Report		Stadium: Alpha Sports Centre

5 March 2009 2009 Cyprus Cup group	South Africa	0–6	England	Larnaca, Cyprus
		Report	Williams 18'; Sanderson 19'; Smith 42'; Houghton 54'; Chapman 87', 91'	Stadium: GSZ Stadium

7 March 2009 2009 Cyprus Cup group	England	2–2	France	Paralimni, Cyprus
	Carney 28'; Stoney 75'		Franco 15'; Thomis 72'	Stadium: Paralimni Stadium

10 March 2009 2009 Cyprus Cup group	England	3–0	Scotland	Larnaca, Cyprus
	Aluko 40'; Westwood 66'; Clarke 83'			Stadium: GSZ Stadium

12 March 2009 2009 Cyprus Cup Final	England	3–1	Canada	Nicosia, Cyprus
	Sanderson 32'; Smith 40'; Williams 45'	Report	Sinclair 14'	Stadium: GSP Stadium

23 April 2009 Friendly	England	3–0	Norway	Shrewsbury, England
	Williams; Johnson	Report		Stadium: New Meadow

16 July 2009 Friendly	England	0–2	Iceland	Colchester, England
		Report	Magnúsdóttir; Viðarsdóttir	Stadium: Colchester Community Stadium; Attendance: 4,170

22 July 2009 Friendly	England	1–0	Denmark	Swindon, England
	Handley	Report		Stadium: The County Ground; Attendance: 4,177; Referee: Simon Hooper (England)

25 August 2009 Euro 2009 group stage	Italy	2–1	England	Lahti, Finland
	Panico 56'; Tuttino 82'	Report	Williams 38' (pen.)	Stadium: Lahden Stadion; Attendance: 2,950; Referee: Bibiana Steinhaus (Germany)

28 August 2009 Euro 2009 group stage	England	3–2	Russia	Helsinki, Finland
	Carney 24'; Aluko 32'; K. Smith 42'	Report	Tsybutovich 2'; Kurochkina 22'	Stadium: Finnair Stadium; Attendance: 1,462; Referee: Dagmar Damkova (Czech Republic)

31 August 2009 Euro 2009 group stage	Sweden	1–1	England	Turku, Finland
	Sandell Svensson 40' (pen.)	Report	White 28'	Stadium: Veritas Stadion; Attendance: 6,142; Referee: Kateryna Monzul (Ukraine)

3 September 2009 Euro 2009 quarter-final	Finland	2–3	England	Turku, Finland
	Sjölund 66'; Sällström 79'	Report	Aluko 15', 67'; Williams 49'	Stadium: Veritas Stadion; Attendance: 7,247; Referee: Dagmar Damkova (Czech Republic)

6 September 2009 Euro 2009 semi-final	England	2–1 (a.e.t.)	Netherlands	Tampere, Finland
	K. Smith 61'; J. Scott 116'	Report	Pieëte 64'	Stadium: Ratina Stadion; Attendance: 4,621; Referee: Gyöngyi Gaál (Hungary)

10 September 2009 Euro 2009 Final	England	2–6	Germany	Helsinki, Finland
	Carney 24'; K. Smith 55'	Report	Prinz 20', 76'; Behringer 22'; Kulig 50'; Grings 62', 73'	Stadium: Olympic Stadium; Attendance: 15,877; Referee: Dagmar Damkova (Czech Republic)

25 October 2009 2011 World Cup qualification	England	8–0	Malta	Blackpool, England
	White 8'; F. Williams 21', 39', 66'; Clarke 37', 76'; Westwood 78'; Unitt 87'	Report		Stadium: Bloomfield Road; Attendance: 3,681; Referee: Florence Guillemin (France)

26 November 2009 2011 World Cup qualification	Turkey	0–3	England	İzmir, Turkey
		Report	A. Scott 77'; Sanderson 81'; Unitt 85'	Stadium: Buca Arena; Referee: Sandra Braz Bastos (Portugal)
