= Jonathan Magee =

Northern Irish footballer and academic

Personal information
- Full name: Jonathan Magee
- Date of birth: 9 February 1972 (age 54)
- Place of birth: Lurgan, Northern Ireland
- Position: Forward

Senior career*
Years	Team	Apps	(Gls)
1988–1989	Glenavon	1	(0)
1989–1990	Dungannon Swifts		
1990–1993	Linfield	32	(5)
1993–1994	Bangor	39	(19)
1994	→ Kettering Town (loan)	2	(0)
1994–1995	→ Burton Albion (loan)		
1995	Portadown	2	(0)
1995	Distillery	3	(0)
1995–	Dungannon Swifts		
Total		79+	(24+)
- * Club domestic league appearances and goals

Jonathan Magee (born 9 February 1972) is a Northern Irish academic and former footballer.

== Football career ==
Magee is the son of Eric Magee who played professional football in England for Oldham Athletic. Jonathan began his own career with two of his father's ex–clubs: Glenavon and Linfield. After moving to Bangor in January 1993, Magee became a prolific goalscorer and won an Irish Cup winners' medal. In 1994, he was given an appearance in the national Under 21 team by Bryan Hamilton.

In 1994–95 Magee had short loan spells in the English non–League with Kettering Town and Burton Albion. He returned to local football with Portadown, Distillery then Dungannon Swifts before retiring from the game due to a long–term ankle injury.

== Academic career ==
Magee remained a semi-professional footballer by choice, stating: "I realised that for a long-term career it was better to look beyond the game." He attended Ulster University before gaining further qualifications at Loughborough University and Brighton University. He later worked as a senior lecturer at the University of Central Lancashire, while continuing to publish work on the sociology of sport.

Magee describes himself as a lifelong supporter of Glasgow Rangers and admits to regular attendance at Ibrox Stadium.
