= Cathy Hamstead =

English footballer

Personal information
- Date of birth: Rotherham, England

Senior career*
Years	Team	Apps	(Gls)
- Kilnhurst Ladies

International career
1976	England	2	(0)
- * Club domestic league appearances and goals

Cathy Hamstead is a former England women's international footballer.

== Career ==
Hamstead began her football career at age 14 with Kilnhurst Ladies and then made her England debut at 17. When Hamstead decided to go to Loughborough University she ended up playing for the university team.

In November 2022, Hamstead was recognized by The Football Association as one of the England national team's legacy players, and as the 29th women's player to be capped by England.
