= Claire Lacey =

English footballer (born 1975)

Personal information
- Date of birth: 12 June 1975 (age 51)
- Place of birth: East London, England
- Height: 5 ft 11 in (1.80 m)
- Positions: Goalkeeper; central defender

Senior career*
Years	Team	Apps	(Gls)
1993-2005	West Ham United	350	(0)

International career
1996	England	1	(0)
- * Club domestic league appearances and goals

Claire Lacey is a former England women's international footballer who played for West Ham United. Lacey is notable for being the first West Ham Women's player to win a cap for England.

== International career ==
In November 2022, Lacey was recognized by The Football Association as one of the England national team's legacy players, and as the 112th women's player to be capped by England.
