= Julia Manning =

English association footballer

Personal information
- Full name: Julia Brunton
- Birth name: Julia Manning
- Place of birth: Hillingdon, England
- Position: Forward

Senior career*
Years	Team	Apps	(Gls)
1972-1974	Lowestoft Ladies	29	(154)
- Brighton Supporters Ladies Club

International career
1972-1974	England	4	(1)
- * Club domestic league appearances and goals

Julia Brunton (née Manning) is a former England women's international footballer. She was born in Hillingdon in 1951. Brunton became the first Lowestoft Ladies player to be called up to the England squad in 1972. Brunton also played at Brighton.

== International career ==
Brunton was called up by England for their first ever international against Scotland at Ravenscraig Stadium, Greenock on 18 November 1972 and was on the substitutes bench. She made her first appearance for England against France on 22 April 1973 in a 3–0 victory in Brion, Chateauroux. Brunton’s second cap was against Scotland. In November 2022, Brunton was recognized by The Football Association as one of the England national team's legacy players, and as the 13th women's player to be capped by England.

Brunton also played hockey for Suffolk and the East of England U23 team.
