= Manor Park, Nuneaton =

Stadium in Nuneaton, England

Coordinates: 52°31′21.92″N 1°29′04.16″W

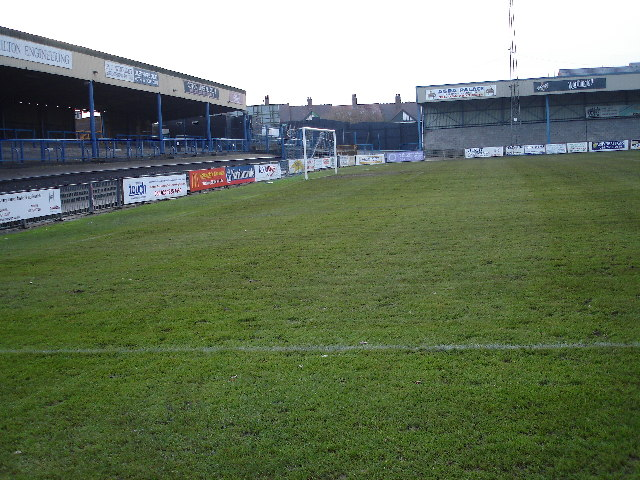
Manor Park

Manor Park was the former stadium of Nuneaton Borough A.F.C. 22,114 spectators packed into the ground for an FA Cup tie against Rotherham United in 1967. The club moved away from Manor Park at the beginning of the 2007–08 season to a new home at Liberty Way which they share with Nuneaton R.F.C. In 2008 Manor Park was demolished and housing was built on the site.

Manor Park staged the first ever official home match of the England women's national team on 23 June 1973, an 8–0 victory over Scotland watched by a crowd of 1,310. The match featured England Women's first ever hattrick which was scored by Pat Firth.
