= Elaine Badrock =

English footballer

Elaine
Personal information
- Full name: Elaine Badrock
- Birth name: Elaine Badrock
- Place of birth: Chester, England
- Position: Forward

Senior career*
Years	Team	Apps	(Gls)
- Prestatyn Ladies

International career
	England	14	(8)
- * Club domestic league appearances and goals

Elaine Badrock is a former English footballer who played as a forward for Prestatyn Ladies in Wales and the England national team.

Badrock represented England 14 times and scored 8 goals.
