= Christine Hutchinson (footballer) =

English footballer

Personal information
- Full name: Christine Knox
- Birth name: Christine Hutchinson
- Position: Forward

Senior career*
Years	Team	Apps	(Gls)
- Wallsend Girls Club

International career
1977-1981	England	9	(1)
- * Club domestic league appearances and goals

Christine Knox (née Hutchinson) is a former England women's international footballer who played for Wallsend Girls Club. After retiring from football Knox became a PE teacher.

== International career ==
In November 2022, Knox was recognized by The Football Association as one of the England national team's legacy players, and as the 36th women's player to be capped by England.
