= Terri Hinton =

English footballer

Theresa Hinton
Personal information
- Full name: Theresa Hinton
- Birth name: Theresa Irvine
- Date of birth: 1952 (age 73–74)
- Place of birth: Bracknell, England
- Position: Goalkeeper

Senior career*
| Years | Team | Apps | (Gls) |
- Bracknell Bullitts
- Aylesbury

International career
| 1980–1984 | England | 7 | (0) |
- * Club domestic league appearances and goals

Theresa Hinton (née Irvine) is a former England women's international footballer.

== Career ==
Terri began her football career at the Berkshire side Bracknell Bullitts at the age of 21. Initially starting as a forward, she soon found she preferred playing as a goalkeeper, a position in which she thrived at Bracknell Bullitts before eventually transferring to Aylesbury.

=== International career ===
Terri made her England debut on 1 June 1980 against Wales, and continued to represent England for the next four years. She was part of the England squad that competed at the 1984 European Competition for Women's Football where England lost against Sweden in the final. In November 2022, Terri was recognized by The Football Association as one of the England national team's legacy players, and as the 53rd women's player to be capped by England.

Personal Life

Terri currently lives in Weymouth, Dorset with her husband Tony. She has 2 daughters, Nikki (1975) and Charlotte (1985) and three grandchildren, Grace, Ava and Freddie.
