= Elly Manuputty =

Former Dutch footballer

Personal information
- Full name: Elly Titapasanea-Manuputty
- Place of birth: Steenwijk, Netherlands

International career
| Years | Team | Apps | (Gls) |
| 1978 | Netherlands | 4 | (2) |

Elly Manuputty is a former Dutch footballer who represented the Netherlands women's national football team 4 times.

== International career ==
On May 30, 1978, Manuputty won the first of 4 caps for the Dutch national team playing against Italy.
