= Audrey Rigby =

New Zealand footballer

Personal information
- Full name: Audrey Rigby
- Date of birth: 17 September 1957 (age 69)
- Position: Defender

Senior career*
Years	Team	Apps	(Gls)
- Nottingham Forest

International career
1976	England	1	(0)
1983–1987	New Zealand	14	(1)
- * Club domestic league appearances and goals

Audrey Rigby (née Allen; born 17 September 1957) is a former association football player who represented New Zealand at international level.

Rigby made her Football Ferns as a substitute in a 0–0 draw with Australia on 28 November 1983, and finished her international career with 14 caps to her credit.

In 1972–73 Rigby was in England, playing for an early incarnation of Nottingham Forest Ladies. She played for England in a 5–1 win over Wales in 1976.

She was allotted 32 when the FA announced their legacy numbers scheme to honour the 50th anniversary of England’s inaugural international.
