= Ravenscraig Stadium =

Stadium in Greenock, Scotland

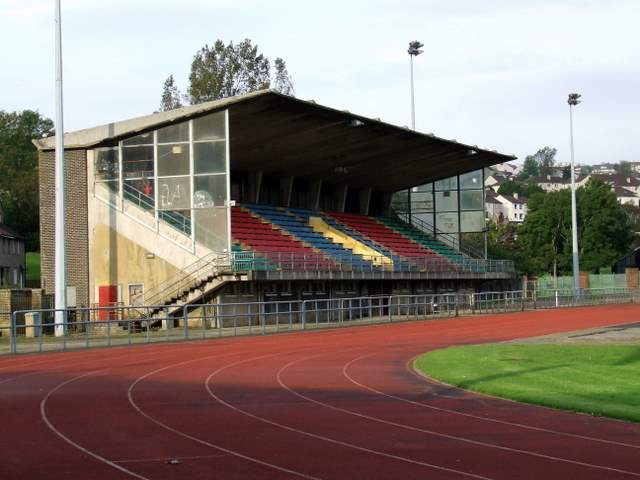
- The Grandstand

- Location within Inverclyde
- Full name: Ravenscraig Stadium
- Location: Greenock, Scotland
- Coordinates: 55°56′25″N 4°48′47″W
- Capacity: 650
- Surface: Grass

Construction
- Built: 1958
- Renovated: 1992, 2009, 2012

Ravenscraig Stadium is a multi-purpose stadium, in Greenock, Inverclyde, Scotland. The stadium is primarily set up for athletics, with a running track, but it is also the traditional home of Greenock Juniors Football Club. The stadium underwent a £1.7 million refurbishment in preparation for the 2014 Commonwealth Games.

The stadium was built in 1958 with a cinder track, upgraded to synthetic in 1992. Replacement floodlighting was announced in 2015.

In the 1959–60 season, a capacity crowd of 8,200 watched Greenock Juniors draw 1–1 in a Scottish Junior Cup quarter final with Johnstone Burgh.

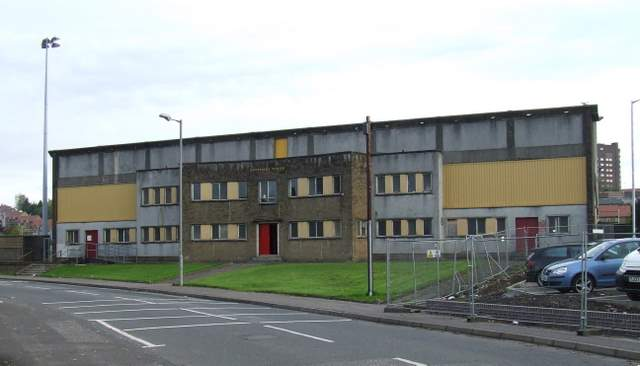
The stadium front

In November 1972 the stadium hosted the first ever official international women's football match to be played in Great Britain. Scotland was defeated 3–2 by England. This was almost exactly a hundred years after the first men's international between the two nations.
