= Pat Firth =

English footballer

Personal information
- Full name: Pat Mitchell-Firth
- Birth name: Patricia Firth
- Date of birth: 1956 or 1957 (age 69–70)
- Place of birth: Leeds, England
- Position: Forward

Senior career*
Years	Team	Apps	(Gls)
- Fodens Ladies F.C.
- Rowntrees L.F.C.
- Bronte L.F.C.

International career
1973–1977	England	12	(9)
- * Club domestic league appearances and goals

Pat Mitchell-Firth (née Firth) is a former England women's international footballer. She represented the England women's national football team at senior international level and spent her early career at Fodens where she won the Women's FA Cup.

== Early life ==
At nine years old Firth was seen playing football in the park and invited to play for Swillington Saints under-12s, a boys' team. The team had to play in a 'friendly league' not associated with the FA for her to be allowed to participate. She had no choice but to leave the team at age 12, playing for a pub team before being invited to join the Fleece Fillies in Wakefield.

== Club career ==
In 1974 Firth won the WFA Cup with Fodens after they beat three times defending champions Southampton 2–1, with Alison Leatherbarrow scoring both goals in Bedford.

After initially retiring aged 21 following a knee injury, Firth later worked as a player coach at Rowntrees LFC. She played as a goalkeeper and they reached the semi final of the 1984 WFA Cup where they lost to Howbury Grange. In 1984 she also earnt an FA preliminary coaching licence. She later moved to North West League side Bronte where she again took the role as player-coach and helped the team reach the semi finals of the WFA Cup in 1989 where they lost to Friends of Fulham.

== International career ==
Firth was the scorer of England Women's first ever hat-trick in an international when she scored three goals against Scotland on debut in an 8–0 win at Manor Park, Nuneaton on 23 June 1973, when she was 16 years and 12 days old. It was England's first official home fixture.

In November 2022, Firth was recognized by The Football Association as one of the England national team's legacy players, and as the 16th women's player to be capped by England.

== Honours ==
Fodens Ladies F.C.

- FA Women's Cup: 1973–74
