= Eric Worthington =

English footballer and coach

Personal information
- Full name: Eric Senior Worthington
- Date of birth: 29 December 1925
- Place of birth: Sheffield, England
- Date of death: 16 November 2006 (aged 80)
- Place of death: Sydney, Australia
- Position: Forward

Senior career*
Years	Team	Apps	(Gls)
1943–1945	Golders Green		
1945–1947	Willesden		
1947–1949	Queens Park Rangers	0	(0)
1949–1951	Watford	24	(4)
1951–1953	Dover		
1953	Bradford City	2	(1)
1953–1961	Margate		

Managerial career
- 1972: England women
- 1974: Australia U23
- 1975: Australia (caretaker)
- 1976: Papua New Guinea
- * Club domestic league appearances and goals

Eric Senior Worthington (29 December 1925 – 16 November 2006) was an English professional footballer and football coach who played as a forward. After a playing career which included spells in the Football League with Watford and Bradford City, he was appointed the first ever manager of the England women's national team in 1972. He later coached the men's national teams of Australia and Papua New Guinea. He is a member of Australia's Football Hall of Fame.

== Playing career ==
After two years at Queens Park Rangers without appearing in the first team, Worthington made his Football League debut with Watford after joining in August 1949. He combined his duties as a schoolmaster and professional footballer, making 30 appearances for the Hornets over two seasons before dropping into non–league with Dover. A prolific spell with Dover saw a brief return to the league ranks with Bradford City in September 1953, before, weeks later, he was back in Kent with Margate while doing a teacher training course.

Worthington remained with Margate eight years, overcoming injuries to make 243 appearances in both attack and midfield, scoring 36 goals and captaining the team on occasion. He retired in 1961 to take up a position at Loughborough College.

== Coaching career ==
Worthington was the original manager of the England women's national football team, taking charge for their first official match against Scotland in 1972. The following year he was appointed director of coaching by Australian Soccer Federation and was tasked with overhauling the entire structure of football coaching in Australia. He was later hailed as an "outstanding servant" and "pioneer", though his administration's apparent preference for British coaches led to allegations of "jobs for the boys" and a "pommie mafia". In 1975 Worthington took charge of the Australia national soccer team for four friendlies at B level.

Worthington coached the Papua New Guinea national team during their Olympic qualifiers in 1976. He retired as director of coaching in 1989 and his last official role was taking an Australian student select team to his home city of Sheffield for the 1991 Summer Universiade. He was inducted into the Australian Football Hall of Fame in 1999.
