= Jeannie Allott =

Footballer (born 1956)

Personal information
- Date of birth: 17 November 1956 (age 69)
- Place of birth: Crewe, England
- Position: Winger

Senior career*
Years	Team	Apps	(Gls)
1966–1976	Fodens		
- Zwart-Wit '28
- KFC '71

International career
1972–1976	England	11	(1)
1985–1987	Netherlands	12	(8)
- * Club domestic league appearances and goals

Jeannie Allott (born 17 November 1956) is a former footballer who played as a winger. She represented both England and the Netherlands at international level.

== Early life ==
Born in Crewe, Jeannie Allott is the granddaughter of champion speedway rider Tommy Allott. She began playing football in the street as a child. When Allott was eight years old she featured in Sports Illustrated's 'Faces in the Crowd' segment, as the only girl playing in the school football team at Wistaston Green Primary School. The school headmaster told Allott she was banned from playing, but she instead joined Foden's Ladies FC.

== Club career ==
In 1966 Allott made her debut for Foden's, originally a works team from the Edwin Foden, Sons & Co. lorry manufacturing plant in nearby Sandbach, in a charity match. Her manager bought her a pair of football boots as she couldn't afford to buy her own. She was part of the Foden's team which defeated Southampton in the 1974 final of the Women's FA Cup, winning the Player of the Match award.

In 1976 Allott moved to the Netherlands and joined the Zwart-Wit '28 club. She has said that she left because at the time "England did absoutely nothing for girls' football". By May 1988 she was playing for KFC '71. Allott remained in the Netherlands where she worked as a shipping planner.

== International career ==
In 1972, Allott progressed through a series of trials to be selected in Eric Worthington's first England team. She scored in the team's first official match, a 3–2 win over Scotland in Greenock on 18 November 1972. At sixteen years and one day old she remains England's youngest goal scorer. In 2022 Allott recalled hitchhiking from her native North West England to London in order to train and play with England.

After becoming established in women's football in the Netherlands, Allott was called up to the Netherlands women's national football team for their 1987 European Competition for Women's Football qualifying campaign. She scored the only goal on her debut against France and a hat-trick in the return fixture, a 5–3 win for the Dutch in Cambrai. She won 12 caps for the Netherlands, scoring a total of eight goals.

Allott felt valued in the Netherlands but remained unhappy at a lack of recognition and respect for female footballers in England: "Nothing that happened in the past should be forgotten but the FA forgot us. We want a cap and I believe we deserve an apology."

She was allotted 10 when the English FA announced their legacy numbers scheme to honour the 50th anniversary of England's inaugural international.
