= Sylvia Gore =

English footballer and coach

Sylvia Gore MBE
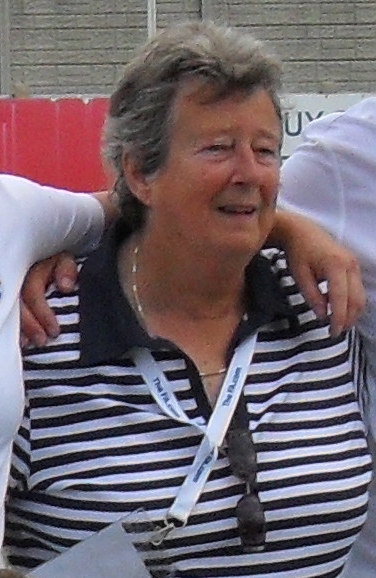
- Gore in 2015

Personal information
- Full name: Sylvia Margaret Gore
- Date of birth: 25 November 1944
- Place of birth: Prescot, England
- Date of death: 9 September 2016 (aged 71)
- Position: Midfielder

Senior career*
Years	Team	Apps	(Gls)
- Manchester Corinthians
1967–?	Fodens		

International career
1972–1974	England	5	(2)

Managerial career
- 1982–1989: Wales
- * Club domestic league appearances and goals

Sylvia Margaret Gore MBE (25 November 1944 – 9 September 2016) was an English football player and coach. She scored the England women's national football team's first goal in its first official match, a 3–2 win over Scotland in Greenock in 1972, and was involved in women's football for 60 years.

== Early life ==
Gore was born in Prescot, Lancashire, and raised in the north-west of England. She attended Our Ladies' Junior School and St Edmund Arrowsmith Secondary School.

Gore's father and uncle both played football for Prescot Cables and encouraged her to take up the game. The headteacher of her school vetoed any participation in the school team but she joined Manchester Corinthians in her early teens. With Corinthians, Gore played in charity matches all over the world at a time when the Football Association (FA) had banned female players from its pitches. She said:

It was incredible playing in those great stadiums. In one of them, in South America, 80,000 people watched us play. Although we were getting good crowds in England, it was so nice to play on proper football pitches, rather than on the rugby and recreation pitches we had at home.

== Playing and coaching career ==
In 1972, Gore paid around £2,000 to progress through a series of trials for the first England team. She was accepted onto the team and made history by scoring the team's first goal in its first match on 18 November 1972.

Gore was in the Fodens team, originally a works team from the Edwin Foden, Sons & Co. lorry manufacturing plant in Sandbach, which defeated Southampton in the 1974 final of the Women's FA Cup. Gore recalled:

It was the first time Southampton had ever lost in a cup game in the three seasons the national cup had been in existence. We were determined to beat them. We weren't frightened of them — even though they had six international players on their side, compared to our four. It was close though, but I think we deserved our 2–1 win.

Gore was known as the Denis Law of women's football and once netted 134 goals in a season. After Gore stopped playing at the age of 35, she managed the Wales women's national football team from 1982 to 1989. She also worked as a football development officer for Knowsley council.

She was allotted 8 when the FA announced their legacy numbers scheme to honour the 50th anniversary of England’s inaugural international.

A new sports pavilion named after her on the King George V playing fields (Browns Field) in Knowsley was opened in 2025. She had played football here as a child. The pavilion will be managed by Berkley FC, a grassroots football club.

== Later life ==
Gore was a member of the FA women's committee for 20 years, and in 1999 she won a special achievement award at the inaugural FA Women's Football Awards. In 2014, she became the first female director at the Liverpool County Football Association. In the 2000 New Year Honours, Gore was appointed a Member of the Order of the British Empire (MBE) for services to girls' and women's football. She was inducted into the National Football Museum Hall of Fame in 2014. In March 2016, Gore became an ambassador for the club Manchester City Women.

Gore died of cancer on 9 September 2016, aged 71.

== Bibliography ==
- Lopez, Sue (1997). Women on the Ball: A Guide to Women's Football. London, England: Scarlet Press. ISBN 1-85727-016-9.
