= Wendy Owen =

English footballer and coach (born 1954)

Personal information
- Date of birth: 1954 (age 71–72)
- Place of birth: Slough, England
- Position: Centre back

Youth career
- Beaconsfield

Senior career*
Years	Team	Apps	(Gls)
1970–1973	Thame Ladies		
1973–1977	Dartford College		
- Maidstone Ladies

International career^{‡}
1972–1977	England	16	(0)
- * Club domestic league appearances and goals ‡ National team caps and goals as of 21 June 2012

Wendy Owen (born 1954) is an English former international football defender and coach. She was a member of the England women's national football team in their first official match, a 3–2 win over Scotland in Greenock.

== Club career ==
Owen was born into a sporting family and played representative netball for Wales, her father David's homeland, as well as football for England. Inspired by watching the 1966 FIFA World Cup Final on television, Owen took up football but was prevented from playing at school and frustrated by the Football Association (FA) ban on female use of its pitches.

In 1968 an "incensed" Owen had to leave the boys' team she had played on when they joined an FA affiliated league. She persuaded her father to form a girls' team in nearby Beaconsfield, who played various other local girls' teams with unregistered referees and on pitches which fell outside the FA's jurisdiction. Underwhelmed with the level of competition, Owen left to join a superior team in Thame near the end of season 1969–70.

== International career ==
On occasions when England's manager John Adams felt Owen had over elaborated he would say: "Wendy, I didn't pick you to play football, you just have to stop the opposition playing, and give it to a white shirt."

During her international career, Owen was mindful of sexist media coverage of women's football. She was asked by photographers to pose applying eye shadow in the Wembley dressing rooms, even though she never used eye shadow.

She was allotted 12 when the FA announced their legacy numbers scheme to honour the 50th anniversary of England’s inaugural international.

== Coaching career ==
Owen founded a women's football team at Dartford Teacher Training College, when travelling to Thame Ladies became too difficult. In her role as player-manager, she led the side to the WFA Cup quarter final in 1976–77 where they lost 3–2 to Southampton.

In spring 1974 Owen was asked by Francisco Marcos, later the founder and commissioner of the United Soccer Leagues (USL), to run a female soccer camp at Hartwick College in the United States.

In January 1987 Owen began working at what became the University of Chester. As of 2012, she was employed as a senior lecturer in Sports Coaching and Pedagogy.

== Bibliography ==
- Lopez, Sue (1997). Women on the Ball: A Guide to Women's Football. London, England: Scarlet Press. ISBN 1-85727-016-9.
- Owen, Wendy (2005). Kicking Against Tradition: A Career in Women's Football. Tempus. ISBN 0752434276.
- Williams, John; Ward, Andrew (2009). "Wembley 1966 and After". Football Nation: Sixty Years of the Beautiful Game. Bloomsbury. ISBN 9781408801260.
