= 1987 European Competition for Women's Football qualifying =

Football tournament qualification stage

The qualification for the 1987 European Competition for Women's Football was held between 26 September 1984 and 12 October 1986. The first-placed teams qualified.

== Results ==
=== Group 1 ===
Team	Pts	Pld	W	D	L	GF	GA
Norway	9	6	3	3	0	12	6
Denmark	6	6	2	2	2	10	10
West Germany	5	6	2	1	3	5	7
Finland	4	6	1	2	3	2	6

26 September 1984

Finland	0–0	Norway
	NFF Report (in Norwegian)

Tuusulan urheilukeskus, Tuusula
Attendance: 500
Referee: Lundgren

3 October 1984

West Germany	1–0	Finland
Eichenlaub 46'	DFB Report (in German)

Nattenberg-Stadion, Lüdenscheid

24 October 1984
19:00

Denmark	1–1	Finland
Pedersen 14'	DBU Report (in Danish)	Sundman 16'

Odense Stadion, Odense
Attendance: 956
Referee: Roger Philippi (Luxembourg)

1 May 1985
16:00

Denmark	3–0	West Germany
Mogensen 24', 64' ?? 60' (o.g.)	DBU Report (in Danish); DFB Report (in German)

Sønderborg Stadion, Sønderborg
Attendance: 800
Referee: Jean-Francois Crucke (Belgium)

11 May 1985

Finland	0–2	Denmark
	DBU Report (in Danish)	Gam-Pedersen 6'; Frederiksen 17'

Urheilukeskus, Kotka
Attendance: 1,603
Referee: Rolf Eriksson (Sweden)

7 September 1985

West Germany	2–3	Norway
Limper-Pfeil 43', 80'	NFF Report (in Norwegian); DFB Report (in German)	Stendal 19', 79'; Nielsen 31'

Wilschenbruch Stadion, Lüneburg
Attendance: 3,200
Referee: Kayser

2 October 1985

Norway	2–2	Denmark
Scheel Aalbu; Karlsen	DBU Report (in Danish); NFF Report (in Norwegian)	Odgaard

Ullevaal Stadion, Oslo
Attendance: 2,000
Referee: Hans Carlsson (Sweden)

5 October 1985

Finland	1–0	West Germany
??	DFB Report (in German)

Turku

19 May 1986

Norway	0–0	West Germany
	NFF Report (in Norwegian); DFB Report (in German)

Bislett Stadion, Oslo
Attendance: 1,200
Referee: Larsson

10 September 1986
19:00

Denmark	2–5	Norway
Obel 23'; Fabrin 80'	DBU Report (in Danish); NFF Report (in Norwegian)	Stendal 5', 78'; Haugen 35'; Nyborg 37'; Støre 70'

Vejle Stadion, Vejle
Attendance: 1,500
Referee: Bo Karlsson (Sweden)

4 October 1986

West Germany	2–0	Denmark
Bartelmann 46'; Fitschen 47'	DBU Report (in Danish); DFB Report (in German)

Belkaw-Arena, Bergisch Gladbach
Referee: Mr. Costatin (Belgium)

4 October 1986

Norway	2–0	Finland
Støre	NFF Report (in Norwegian)

Ullevaal Stadion, Oslo
Attendance: 1,200
Referee: Larsson

Norway qualified for the final tournament.

=== Group 2 ===
Team	Pts	Pld	W	D	L	GF	GA
England	12	6	6	0	0	34	2
Scotland	8	6	4	0	2	24	10
Republic of Ireland	4	6	2	0	4	4	17
Northern Ireland	0	6	0	0	6	2	35

17 March 1985

England	4–0	Scotland

England

5 May 1985
15:30

Republic of Ireland	1–0	Northern Ireland
Cummins 78'	FAI Report

Republic of Ireland

25 May 1985

Northern Ireland	1–7	England

Northern Ireland

2 June 1985
15:00

Scotland	2–1	Republic of Ireland
?? 63' ?? 67'	FAI Report	?? 26'

Scotland

22 September 1985
14:30

Republic of Ireland	0–6	England
	FAI Report	Curl 19', 59', 69'; Powell 24'; Coultard 26'; Sempare 72'

Flower Lodge, Cork

23 November 1985

Northern Ireland	1–9	Scotland

Northern Ireland

16 March 1986

England	10–0	Northern Ireland

England

27 April 1986
14:30

England	4–0	Republic of Ireland
Davis 42', 77'; Curl 47'; Law 50'	FAI Report

Elm Park, Reading

25 May 1986

Scotland	7–0	Northern Ireland

Scotland

30 August 1986
14:30

Northern Ireland	0–1	Republic of Ireland
	FAI Report	?? 43'

Northern Ireland

28 September 1986
14:30

Republic of Ireland	1–5	Scotland
Styles 70'	FAI Report	Marshall 3', 33', 76'; O'Neil 8'; Rice 26'

Republic of Ireland

12 October 1986

Scotland	1–3	England

Scotland

England qualified for the final tournament.

=== Group 3 ===
Team	Pts	Pld	W	D	L	GF	GA
Sweden	10	6	5	0	1	14	3
Netherlands	10	6	5	0	1	14	6
France	2	6	1	0	5	7	15
Belgium	2	6	1	0	5	6	17

16 March 1985
15:00

Netherlands	1–0	France
Allott 3'	Report (in French); KNVB Report (in Dutch)

Cambuur Stadion, Leeuwarden
Attendance: 500
Referee: Paul Rion (Luxembourg)

4 May 1985

Belgium	3–1	France
Verdonck; C. Martens; Schrymecker	KBVB Report (in Dutch); FFF Report (in French)	Musset

Gemeentelijk Stadion, Zaventem

25 May 1985
16:00

France	0–4	Sweden
	Report (in French); SvFF Report (in Swedish)	Uusitalo 13'; Börjesson 55' (pen.), 59' (pen.), 75' (pen.)

Stade Municipal, Pauillac
Attendance: 1,190
Referee: Fernandez Correia (Portugal)

11 June 1985

Sweden	2–0	Netherlands
Sundhage 16'; Axén 62'	KNVB Report (in Dutch); SvFF Report (in Swedish)

Olympia, Helsingborg
Attendance: 1,819
Referee: Olavi Fust (Finland)

28 September 1985
15:00

Belgium	1–3	Netherlands
C. Martens 21'	KNVB Report (in Dutch); KBVB Report (in Dutch)	Timisela 20'; Boogerd 50' de Bakker 60'

Gemeentelijk Stadion, Zaventem
Attendance: 1,000
Referee: Jean-Pierre Schon (Luxembourg)

9 October 1985
19:00

Sweden	5–0	Belgium
Videkull 4' 9'; Sundhage 39' (pen.) 49'; Svenjeby 65'	SvFF Report (in Swedish); KBVB Report (in Dutch)

Stadsparksvallen, Jönköping
Attendance: 4,127

26 October 1985

France	3–5	Netherlands
Constantin 50'; Musset 54'; Romagnoli 68'	Report (in French); KNVB Report (in Dutch)	de Bakker 11'; Allott 22', 32', 47'; Camper 44'

Stade de la Liberté, Cambrai
Attendance: 2,200
Referee: Kurt Röthlisberger (Switzerland)

15 March 1986
15:00

France	3–1	Belgium
Romagnoli 5'; Sidibe 8'; Musset 53'	Report (in French); KBVB Report (in Dutch)	Verdonck 6'

Stade Municipal de Niederbronn, Niederbronn
Attendance: 1,451
Referee: René Bindel (Luxembourg)

17 May 1986

Sweden	1–0	France
Axén 43'	Report (in French); SvFF Report (in Swedish)

Nobelstadion, Karlskoga
Attendance: 3,127

20 September 1986
17:00

Netherlands	3–0	Belgium
Timisela 10'; Allott 15', 75'	KNVB Report (in Dutch); KBVB Report (in Dutch)

Sportpark De Warande, Oosterhout
Attendance: 200
Referee: Jean Lemmer (Luxembourg)

1 October 1986
20:00

Belgium	1–2	Sweden
Verdonck 48'	SvFF Report (in Swedish); KBVB Report (in Dutch)	Axén 39'; Videkull 69'

Pierre Cornelis Stadion, Aalst
Attendance: 953

18 October 1986

Netherlands	2–0	Sweden
de Bakker 33'; Vestjens 42'	KNVB Report (in Dutch); SvFF Report (in Swedish)

Sportpark Bentinckspark, Hoogeveen
Attendance: 2,500
Referee: John Martin (England)

Sweden qualified for the final tournament.

=== Group 4 ===
Team	Pts	Pld	W	D	L	GF	GA
Italy	11	6	5	1	0	13	6
Hungary	7	6	3	1	2	8	7
Spain	3	6	1	1	4	7	9
Switzerland	3	6	1	1	4	5	11

27 April 1985

Hungary	1–0	Spain

Hungary

25 May 1985

Hungary	2–3	Italy
Bárfy 26'; Lojd 61' (pen.)	FIGC Report (in Italian)	Golin 23', 67'; Vignotto 73'

Kömlei Károly Városi Sporttelep, Gyöngyös
Referee: Dahzin (Austria)

25 June 1985
18:00

Spain	0–2	Switzerland
	ASF-SFV Report (in German)	Moser 40'; Sauter 70'

Estadio La Fuensanta, Cuenca
Attendance: 4,500
Referee: Claude Bouillet (France)
Match info

14 September 1985
18:00

Italy	3–0	Switzerland
Vignotto 47' (pen.), 49'; Morace 55'	FIGC Report (in Italian); ASF-SFV Report (in German)

Stadio Silvio Appiani, Padua
Attendance: 1,400
Referee: Victor Mintoff (Malta)
Match info

12 October 1985
15:00

Switzerland	1–2	Hungary
N. Poncioni 35'	ASF-SFV Report (in German)	Bárfy 31'; L. Kiss 67'

Stade du Censuy, Renens
Attendance: 655
Referee: Lartigott (France)
Match info

3 November 1985

Spain	2–3	Italy
Prieto 12'; Hernández Poderoso 41'	FIGC Report (in Italian)	Vignotto 13', 62'; Pierazzuoli 72'

Estadio Lluís Sitjar, Palma
Referee: Guedes (Portugal)

5 April 1986

Spain	1–2	Hungary

Spain

3 May 1986

Italy	1–0	Hungary
Pierazzuoli 65'	FIGC Report (in Italian)

Stadio Alfredo Viviani, Potenza
Referee: Victor Pugliese (Malta)

10 June 1986
17:00

Switzerland	0–3	Spain
	ASF-SFV Report (in German)	García San Juan 45'; Hernández Poderoso 58', 74'

Stadion FC Solothurn, Solothurn
Attendance: 595
Referee: Wiss (Luxembourg)
Match info

11 October 1986
14:00

Hungary	1–1	Switzerland
L. Kiss 46'	ASF-SFV Report (in German)	N. Poncioni 18'

Városi Stadion, Eger
Attendance: 600
Referee: Friedrich Kaupe (Austria)
Match info

11 October 1986

Italy	1–1	Spain
Morace 21'	FIGC Report (in Italian)	García San Juan 30'

Stadio Alberto Braglia, Modena
Referee: Soldatic (Yugoslavia)

1 November 1986
17:30

Switzerland	1–2	Italy
Moser 52'	FIGC Report (in Italian); ASF-SFV Report (in German)	Vignotto 25', 48'

St. Jakob Stadium, Basel
Attendance: 2,700
Referee: Claude Bouillet (France)
Match info

Italy qualified for the final tournament.
