= 1987 European Competition for Women's Football squads =

This article lists all the confirmed national football squads for the 1987 European Competition for Women's Football.

Players marked (c) were named as captain for their national squad.

== England ==
Head coach: (England) Martin Reagan

No.	Pos.	Player	Date of birth (age)	Caps	Goals	Club
1	GK	Theresa Wiseman	0 December 1956 (aged 30–31)			
2	DF	Sue Law				
3	FW	Jackie Slack	25 July 1959 (aged 27)			
4	MF	Debbie Bampton (c)	7 October 1961 (aged 25)			(Italian Football Federation) ACF Trani 80
5	MF	Angela Gallimore				
6	MF	Gillian Coultard	22 July 1963 (aged 23)			(The Football Association) Rowntree W.F.C.
7	MF	Jackie Sherrard	9 June 1966 (aged 21)			
8	DF	Brenda Sempare	9 November 1961 (aged 25)			
9	MF	Marieanne Spacey	13 February 1966 (aged 21)			(The Football Association) Friends of Fulham
10	FW	Kerry Davis	2 August 1962 (aged 24)			(Italian Football Federation) ACF Trani 80
11	DF	Linda Curl				
12	MF	Hope Powell	8 December 1966 (aged 20)			(The Football Association) Millwall Lionesses L.F.C.
14	FW	Jane Stanley	13 April 1964 (aged 23)			(The Football Association) Filey Flyers
15	FW	Loraine Hunt				
16	DF	Lori Hoey				
17	DF	Tracy Davidson	6 January 1961 (aged 26)			(The Football Association) Doncaster Belles

== Italy ==
Head coach: (Italy) Ettore Recagni

No.	Pos.	Player	Date of birth (age)	Caps	Goals	Club
1	GK	Eva Russo	20 December 1966 (aged 20)			
2	MF	Marisa Perin				
3	MF	Tiziana D'Orio	22 June 1964 (aged 22)			
4	DF	Maura Furlotti	12 September 1957 (aged 29)			
5	DF	Paola Bonato	31 January 1961 (aged 26)			
6	MF	Antonella Carta	1 March 1967 (aged 20)			(Italian Football Federation) Giugliano Campania
7	MF	Maria Mariotti	27 January 1964 (aged 23)			
8	MF	Feriana Ferraguzzi	20 February 1959 (aged 28)			(Royal Belgian Football Association) Standard Liège
9	FW	Elisabetta Vignotto (c)	13 January 1954 (aged 33)			(Italian Football Federation) Friulvini Pordenone
10	FW	Carolina Morace	5 February 1964 (aged 23)			(Italian Football Federation) Lazio
11	DF	Ida Golin				
12	GK	Giorgia Brenzan	21 August 1967 (aged 19)			
13	MF	Viviana Bontacchio	11 June 1959 (aged 28)			(Italian Football Federation) ACF Trani 80
14	DF	Marina Cordenons	12 January 1969 (aged 18)			
15	DF	Frigerio				
16	DF	Sandra Pierrazzuoli				

== Norway ==
Head coach: (Norway) Erling Hokstad

No.	Pos.	Player	Date of birth (age)	Caps	Goals	Club
1	GK	Janne Andreassen				(Norwegian Football Federation) Bøler
2	MF	Torill Hoch-Nielsen	12 March 1966 (aged 21)			(Norwegian Football Federation) Sprint-Jeløy
3	MF	Liv Strædet	21 October 1964 (aged 22)			(Norwegian Football Federation) Sprint-Jeløy
4	DF	Bjørg Storhaug	9 May 1962 (aged 25)			(Norwegian Football Federation) Klepp
5	MF	Mariann Mortensen	24 August 1951 (aged 35)			(Norwegian Football Federation) BUL
6	FW	Ellen Scheel Aalbu	26 November 1968 (aged 18)			(Norwegian Football Federation) Jardar
7	MF	Tone Haugen	6 February 1964 (aged 23)			(Norwegian Football Federation) Trondheims-Ørn
8	DF	Heidi Støre (c)	4 July 1963 (aged 23)			(Swedish Football Association) Trollhättans IF
9	FW	Trude Stendal	30 May 1963 (aged 24)			(Norwegian Football Federation) Sandviken
10	DF	Gunn Nyborg	21 March 1960 (aged 27)			(Norwegian Football Federation) Asker
11	FW	Kari Nielsen	26 May 1959 (aged 28)			(Norwegian Football Federation) Asker
12	GK	Hege Ludvigsen	28 January 1964 (aged 23)			(Norwegian Football Federation) Sprint-Jeløy
13	MF	Tone Opseth	10 November 1959 (aged 27)			(Norwegian Football Federation) Setskog/Høland FK
14	MF	Lisbeth Bakken	24 October 1967 (aged 19)			(Norwegian Football Federation) Sprint-Jeløy
15	MF	Trude Haugland	18 September 1966 (aged 20)			(Norwegian Football Federation) Grand
16	DF	Trine Stenberg	6 December 1969 (aged 17)			(Norwegian Football Federation) Sandviken

== Sweden ==
Head coach: (Sweden) Ulf Lyfors

No.	Pos.	Player	Date of birth (age)	Caps	Goals	Club
1	GK	Elisabeth Leidinge	6 March 1957 (aged 30)	49	0	(Swedish Football Association) Jitex BK
2	FW	Lena Videkull	9 December 1962 (aged 24)	17	12	(Swedish Football Association) Kronängs IF
3	MF	Gunilla Axén	27 October 1966 (aged 20)	16	5	(Swedish Football Association) Gideonsbergs IF
4	FW	Eleonor Hultin	9 August 1963 (aged 23)	3	1	(Swedish Football Association) GAIS
5	MF	Eva Andersson		30	5	(Swedish Football Association) Öxabäcks IF
6	MF	Anna Svenjeby	0 December 1962 (aged 24–25)	50	5	(Swedish Football Association) Kronängs IF
7	FW	Pia Sundhage	13 February 1960 (aged 27)	60	31	(Swedish Football Association) Jitex BK
8	DF	Anette Nicklasson		31	0	(Swedish Football Association) Jitex BK
9	DF	Karin Åhman-Svensson		48	2	(Swedish Football Association) Öxabäcks IF
10	DF	Anette Börjesson (c)	11 November 1954 (aged 32)	62	11	(Swedish Football Association) GAIS
11	MF	Helena Carlsson		2	1	(Swedish Football Association) Trollhättans IF
12	GK	Ing-Marie Olsson	23 February 1966 (aged 21)	1	0	(Swedish Football Association) Malmö FF
13	FW	Anneli Andelén	21 June 1968 (aged 18)	3	0	(Swedish Football Association) Öxabäcks IF
14	MF	Marie Karlsson	4 December 1963 (aged 23)	6	0	(Swedish Football Association) Öxabäcks IF
15	FW	Helen Johansson	9 July 1965 (aged 21)	20	8	(Swedish Football Association) GAIS
16	DF	Anette Hansson	2 May 1963 (aged 24)	9	1	(Swedish Football Association) Öxabäcks IF

Source: Swedish Football Association
