= Bjørg Storhaug =

Norwegian football player (born 1962)

Personal information
- Date of birth: 9 May 1962 (age 64)
- Place of birth: Klepp Municipality, Norway
- Position: Defender

Senior career*
| Years | Team | Apps | (Gls) |
| 1978-1988 | Klepp IL | | |

International career
| 1986-1988 | Norway | 25 | (0) |
Medal record
Women's football
Representing Norway
UEFA Women's Championship
| Gold medal – first place | Norway 1987 | Team |
- * Club domestic league appearances and goals

Bjørg Storhaug (born 9 May 1962) is a retired Norwegian football player who played in the 1987 UEFA Women's Championship. Bjørg Storhaug retired from football in 1988 to be a farmer full time.

== International career ==
Storhaug was also part of the Norwegian team at the 1987 European Championships. Bjørg Storhaug represented Norway 25 times.

== Personal life ==
Storhaug's younger sister Turid was also a professional footballer and her father is politician Lars Storhaug.

== Honours ==
Norway

- UEFA Women's Championship: 1987
