= Turid Storhaug =

Norwegian association football player

Personal information
- Date of birth: 21 October 1968 (age 58)
- Place of birth: Klepp Municipality, Norway
- Position: Forward

Senior career*
Years	Team	Apps	(Gls)
- Klepp IL

International career
1986-1991	Norway	15	(3)
Medal record
Women's football
Representing Norway
UEFA Women's Championship
Silver medal – second place	West Germany 1989	Team
- * Club domestic league appearances and goals

Turid Storhaug (born 21 October 1968) is a former Norwegian footballer who played in the 1989 UEFA Women's Championship.

== Career ==
Turid Storhaug won the Norwegian First Division in 1987 with Klepp IL. Storhaug had the most Toppserien appearances with Klepp IL until she was surpassed by Gry Tofte Ims in 2015.

=== International career ===
Storhaug was also part of the Norwegian team at the 1989 European Championships. Bjørg Storhaug represented Norway alongside her sister.

== Personal life ==
Storhaug's older sister Bjørg was also a professional footballer and her father is politician Lars Storhaug.

== Honours ==
Norway

- UEFA Women's Championship: 1989 - Runner up
