= Cecilia Sandell =

Swedish footballer

Personal information
- Full name: Ann Cecilia Sandell
- Date of birth: 10 June 1968 (age 58)
- Place of birth: Karlskrona, Sweden
- Height: 1.74 m (5 ft 8 1/2 in)
- Position: Defender

Youth career
- Asarum

Senior career*
Years	Team	Apps	(Gls)
1984–1992	Lindsdal		
1993–2000	Älvsjö		

International career
1992–2000	Sweden	62	(3)

Managerial career
- 2001–2002: Älvsjö (assistant)
- * Club domestic league appearances and goals

Ann Cecilia Sandell (born 10 June 1968) is a Swedish former association football midfielder who won 62 caps for the Sweden women's national football team, scoring three goals. She represented Sweden at the inaugural Olympic women's football tournament in 1996 and 2000.

== Club career ==
In 1999 Sandell collected the Diamantbollen award for Sweden's best female footballer. She had signed for Älvsjö from Lindsdals in 1993 and been part of the team which won five consecutive Damallsvenskan titles from 1995 to 1999. Although signed as a midfielder, she was successfully converted to a central defender.

== International career ==
Sandell made her senior Sweden debut in August 1992; a 3–3 draw with Norway. Her early national team career was marked by injury and she did not play at UEFA Women's Euro 1993 or the 1995 FIFA Women's World Cup, which Sweden hosted. Restored to the squad for the 1996 Olympics, Sandell also played at UEFA Women's Euro 1997, the 1999 FIFA Women's World Cup and the 2000 Olympics.

She went to UEFA Women's Euro 2001 as Sweden's press officer, as she had retired from playing to take up a position as Älvsjö's assistant coach.

== Personal life ==
Sandell has a twin, Camilla, who is married to former footballer Victoria Svensson.
