= Eleonor Hultin =

Swedish footballer (born 1964)

Personal information
- Full name: Eleonor Hultin
- Date of birth: 9 August 1963 (age 63)
- Position: Forward

Senior career*
Years	Team	Apps	(Gls)
- GAIS
- Jitex BK

International career^{‡}
1983–1991	Sweden	24	(6)
- * Club domestic league appearances and goals as of 10:11, 5 June 2021 (UTC) ‡ National team caps and goals as of 10:11, 5 June 2021 (UTC)

Eleonor Hultin (born 9 August 1963) is a Swedish former footballer who played as a forward for GAIS and Jitex BK of the Swedish Championship. She won two editions of the Årets Fotbollstjej Award, the forerunner of the Diamantbollen, in 1987 and 1989, and was Damallsvenskan top scorer in 1989. She won 24 caps and scored six goals for the Sweden women's national football team.

== Club career ==
In 1987, while playing for the Gothenburg club GAIS, Hultin was named Swedish Women's Footballer of the Year. After transferring to Jitex BK based in nearby Mölndal, she won the award again in 1989. Her 25 goals that season made her the top goal scorer and helped Jitex secure the 1989 Damallsvenskan title.

== International career ==
Hultin made her debut for Sweden women's national football team in the 1984 European Competition for Women's Football qualifying series, as a substitute in a 5–0 win over Iceland in Ronneby on 24 August 1983. She scored her first goal in Sweden's next fixture, a 2–1 win over rivals Norway in Elverum on 24 September 1983.

Sweden had a strong team during Hultin's national team career and, although she amassed a 20–1–3 record in her 24 appearances, she was not selected for the final stages of Sweden's victorious 1984 European Competition for Women's Football campaign. She did participate in the squads which finished second in 1987 and third in 1989, and she featured in the 2–0 friendly win over England at Wembley Stadium in May 1989. Her final appearance was in February 1991, prior to the 1991 FIFA Women's World Cup in November.
