= Axén =

Axén is a surname. Notable people with the surname include:

- Alexander Axén (born 1971), Swedish football manager
- Gunilla Axén (born 1966), Swedish footballer
- Gunnar Axén (born 1967), Swedish politician
- Kristina Axén Olin (born 1962), Swedish politician
