= Erling Hokstad =

Norwegian football manager (born 1940)

Personal information
- Date of birth: 7 August 1940 (age 86)
- Position: Midfielder

Senior career*
Years	Team	Apps	(Gls)
- Vito
1962	Skeid		
1963	Vito		
1964–	Eidsvold Turn		

Managerial career
- 1971–1975: Eidsvold Turn
- 1976–1977: Kongsvinger
- 1978: Strømmen
- 1979: Stabæk
- 1980–1985: Eidsvold Turn
- 1983–1989: Norway women
- 1990: Lyn
- 1991–1994: Holter
- * Club domestic league appearances and goals

Erling Hokstad (born 7 August 1940) was a Norwegian football midfielder and later manager.

He was born in Frøya. Moving south to take his education, he graduated from teachers' college in 1963 and the State School of Gymnastics in 1965. He was subsequently employed as PE teacher at Nannestad lower secondary school in 1966.

He represented Lesla IL, IL Vito and Skeid in his early career, returning to Vito in 1963 after completing his compulsory military service. After debuting for Eidsvold Turn in 1964, he spent the remainder of his playing career there. Following an injury, he started his managing career in the same club, and took further education at the Norwegian School of Sport Sciences.

After four seasons in Kongsvinger, Strømmen and Stabæk, he returned to Eidsvold Turn in 1980. He continued through 1985, but also managed the Norwegian women's national team from 1983. His major achievement was the gold medal in the 1987 UEFA Women's Championship.

After a stint on the Norwegian men's second tier with Lyn in 1990, he managed Holter IF from 1991 through 1994, guiding the team to the third tier in Norway.
