= Frigeri =

Frigeri is a surname. Notable people with the surname include:

- Lucas Frigeri (born 1989), Brazilian footballer
- Rodolfo Frigeri (1941–2015), Argentine economist and politician

== See also ==
- Frigerio
