= Antal Bárfy =

Hungarian football player (1930–2023)

Personal information
- Date of birth: 30 October 1930
- Place of birth: Kispest, Hungary
- Date of death: 1 March 2023 (aged 92)
- Place of death: Budapest, Hungary
- Position: Midfielder

Antal Bárfy (30 October 1930 – 1 March 2023) was a Hungarian footballer who played as a midfielder for Budapest Honvéd FC.

== Personal life ==
Antal Bárfy had a daughter Ágnes Bárfy, who was also a footballer.
