= Ranveig Karlsen =

Norwegian footballer

Personal information
- Date of birth: 14 January 1961 (age 65)
- Position: Midfielder

International career
Years	Team	Apps	(Gls)
1978-1985	Norway	25	(2)

Ranveig Karlsen (born 14 January 1961) is a former Norwegian national football team player and women's football coach. After retiring she coached LSK Kvinner FK in 2009.

== International career ==
Karlsen played 25 times for Norway between 1978 and 1985 and scored two goals.
