= Jane Stanley =

English footballer

Personal information
- Date of birth: 13 April 1964 (age 62)
- Place of birth: Filey, England
- Position: Forward

Senior career*
Years	Team	Apps	(Gls)
1983–1989	Filey Flyers	200	(262)
1989-1996	Standard Fémina de Liège		

International career
1986–1990	England	27	(3)
- * Club domestic league appearances and goals

Jane Stanley (born 1964) is an English former international women's footballer. She represented England and spent much of her club career in Belgium, with Standard Fémina de Liège.

== Club career ==
In 1989 Stanley turned professional, joining Belgian club Standard Fémina de Liège on a three-year contract worth a reported £100 per week.

== International career ==
Martin Reagan gave Stanley her first appearance for England on 27 April 1986, in a 4–0 European Championship qualifying win over Republic of Ireland at Elm Park in Reading.

In November 2022, Stanley was recognized by The Football Association as one of the England national team's legacy players, and as the 69th women's player to be capped by England.

== Honours ==
Belgian Women's First Division (4): 1989–90, 1990–91, 1991–92, 1993–94
Belgian Women's Cup (2): 1990, 1995
