= List of Norway women's international footballers =

The Norway women's national football team represents Norway in international association football. It is fielded by the Norwegian Football Federation, NFF, the governing body of football in Norway, and competes as a member of the Union of European Football Associations (UEFA), which encompasses the countries of Europe. Norway competed for the first time on 7 July 1978, in a match the team lost 1–2 against Sweden.

Norway has competed in numerous competitions, and all players who have played between 55 or more matches, either as a member of the starting eleven or as a substitute, are listed below. Each player's details include her usual playing position while with the team, the number of caps earned and goals scored in all international matches, and details of the first and most recent matches played in. The names are initially ordered by number of caps (in descending order), then by date of debut, then by alphabetical order. All statistics are correct up to 8 November 2019.

== Key ==
Player
This colour background and the * symbol indicate that the player was active at club level as at the date specified above.

Positions key
GK	Goalkeeper
DF	Defender
MF	Midfielder
FW	Forward
U	Unknown

Position
Caps and goals
Caps and goals comprise those in the FIFA Women's World Cup and UEFA European Women's Championship, their associated qualification matches and international friendly tournaments and matches.

== Players ==
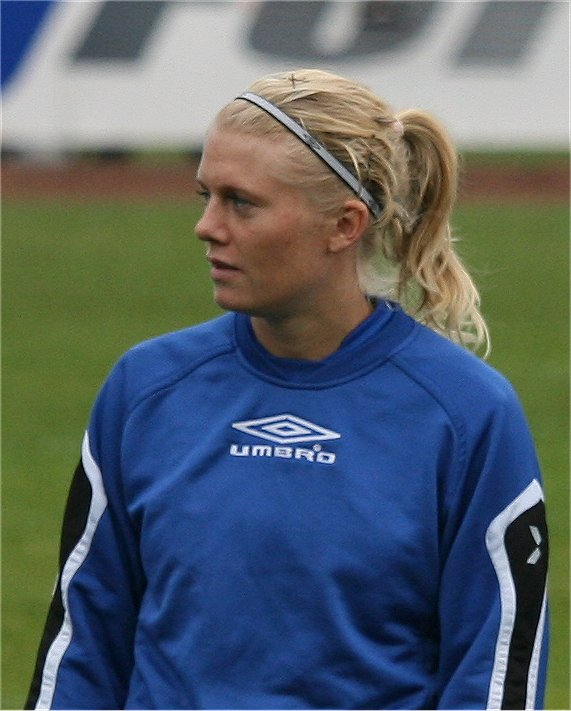
Solveig Gulbrandsen is Norway's second most capped player behind Hege Riise.

This list is under construction.

Norway women's national team football players with at least 25 caps
No.	Player	Pos.	Caps	Goals	Debut		Last or most recent match		Ref.
No.	Player	Pos.	Caps	Goals	Date	Opponent	Date	Opponent	Ref.
1	Hege Riise	MF	188	58	23 July 1990	Canada	27 May 2004	Denmark	
2	Solveig Gulbrandsen	MF	183	55	17 June 1998	Germany	22 June 2015	England	
3	Bente Nordby	GK	172	0	30 August 1991	United States	27 October 2007	Russia	
4	Trine Rønning	DF / MF	162	22	23 October 1999	Portugal	9 March 2016	Switzerland	
5	Linda Medalen	FW	152	64	7 October 1987	Denmark	23 October 1999	Portugal	
6	Heidi Støre	MF	151	22	10 July 1980	Faroe Islands	6 July 1997	Italy	
7	Maren Mjelde *	DF / MF	146	19	27 October 2007	Russia	8 November 2019	Northern Ireland	
8	Ingvild Stensland	MF	144	10	23 January 2003	United States	7 June 2016	Wales	
9	Ingrid Hjelmseth	GK	138	0	23 January 2003	United States	3 September 2019	England	
10	Unni Lehn	MF	133	24	31 August 1996	Slovakia	14 July 2007	United States	
=	Isabell Herlovsen *	FW	133	67	11 March 2005	Germany	8 October 2019	Faroe Islands	
12	Elise Thorsnes *	DF / FW	121	20	10 May 2006	Serbia and Montenegro	8 November 2019	Northern Ireland	
13	Brit Sandaune	FW	120	9	20 March 1995	United States	16 November 2003	Spain	
14	Ann Kristin Aarønes	FW	111	60	2 September 1990	England	23 October 1999	Portugal	
15	Gunn Nyborg	U	110	20	7 July 1978	Sweden	10 October 1992	Netherlands	
16	Ane Stangeland Horpestad	DF	107	5	12 May 1999	Italy	2 October 2008	Russia	
17	Gro Espeseth	DF	105	9	2 March 1991	Sweden	28 September 2000	United States	
18	Kristine Minde *	MF	104	9	6 July 2011	Australia	3 September 2019	England	
19	Marianne Pettersen	FW	98	66	29 October 1994	Italy	16 November 2003	Spain	
=	Leni Larsen Kaurin	MF	98	5	11 March 2001	Finland	28 July 2013	Germany	
21	Agnete Carlsen	MF	96	17	5 November 1998	Netherlands	6 July 1997	Italy	
22	Dagny Mellgren	FW	94	49	14 March 1999	Finland	29 October 2005	Italy	
23	Lene Mykjåland	MF / FW	91	14	7 March 2007	Germany	7 June 2016	Wales	
24	Marit Fiane Grødum	DF	89	12	16 March 2003	United States	30 October 2013	Netherlands	
25	Tone Haugen	MF	87	19	30 May 1985	Netherlands	2 August 1996	Brazil	
=	Monica Knudsen	MF	87	6	31 August 1996	Slovakia	16 November 2003	Spain	
27	Birthe Hegstad	MF	83	23	5 July 1987	United States	20 March 1995	United States	
=	Emilie Haavi *	FW	83	16	3 June 2010	Canada	8 June 2019	Nigeria	
29	Caroline Graham Hansen *	MF / FW	82	37	26 October 2011	Belgium	8 November 2019	Northern Ireland	
30	Marita Skammelsrud Lund	DF / MF	81	2	27 October 2007	Russia	24 October 2016	Sweden	
31	Liv Strædet	U	79	5	25 October 1981	England	30 November 1991	United States	
=	Margunn Haugenes	MF	79	13	21 March 1990	Finland	4 July 2001	Germany	
=	Ragnhild Gulbrandsen	FW	79	30	10 March 1997	Finland	30 September 2007	United States	
34	Gunhild Følstad	DF	76	1	21 July 2002	United States	2 October 2008	Russia	
35	Lise Klaveness	MF / FW	73	9	23 January 2002	United States	9 March 2011	Denmark	
36	Gøril Kringen	DF	72	0	30 July 1995	Australia	13 October 2001	France	
37	Reidun Seth	GK	71	0	26 September 1984	Finland	6 July 1996	Finland	
38	Ingrid Moe Wold *	DF	70	3	17 January 2012	Sweden	8 November 2019	Northern Ireland	
39	Nora Holstad Berge	DF	69	2	2 March 2011	Finland	24 July 2017	Denmark	
40	Cathrine Zaborowski	MF	68	7	1 June 1988	Thailand	24 September 1994	Czech Republic	
41	Ada Hegerberg *	FW	66	38	19 November 2011	Northern Ireland	24 July 2017	Denmark	
42	Anne Nymark Rylandsholm	DF / MF	65	9	13 June 1990	Finland	23 June 1999	Canada	
43	Lene Storløkken	MF	64	6	20 January 2006	China	9 March 2011	Denmark	
=	Ingvild Isaksen	MF	64	3	31 January 2009	Sweden	5 March 2018	Portugal	
45	Melissa Wiik	FW	63	15	2 October 2004	Spain	31 March 2012	Bulgaria	
46	Anita Rapp	DF	62	12	10 October 1998	Sweden	16 November 2003	Spain	
47	Merete Myklebust	DF	60	2	25 September 1993	Germany	6 November 1997	Germany	
=	Anne Tønnessen	DF	60	0	31 August 1996	Slovakia	27 May 2004	Denmark	
49	Toril Hetland Akerhaugen	DF	59	0	20 January 2006	China	30 October 2013	Netherlands	
50	Tina Svensson Grønlund	DF	57	11	13 June 1990	Finland	2 August 1996	Brazil	
51	Marie Knutsen	MF	55	6	19 February 2005	France	28 October 2009	Slovakia	

== See also ==
- Norway women's national football team
