= Diamantbollen =

Swedish women's association football award

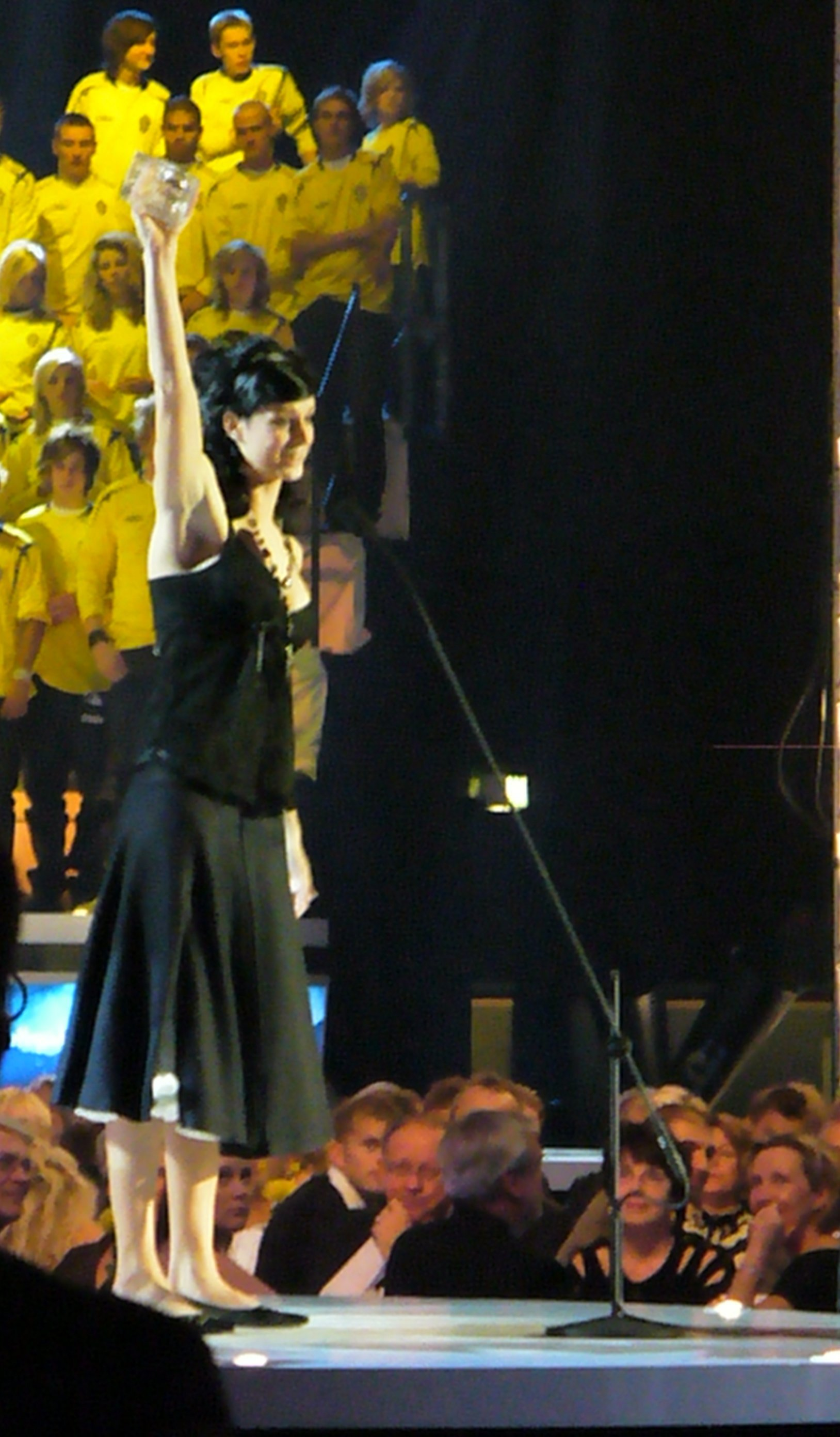
- Lotta Schelin receiving the Diamantbollen Award of 2006
- Awarded for: association football award
- Country: Sweden
- Presented by: Swedish Football Association, Sydsvenskan

History
- First award: 1990
- Most wins: Lotta Schelin (5)
- Most recent: Nathalie Björn (1st award)
- Website: SvenskFotboll.se

Diamantbollen, Swedish for the Diamond Ball, an annual award for Sweden's best female football player. The award is currently awarded by the Swedish Football Association and Sydsvenskans newspaper, in conjunction with its male equivalent, Guldbollen.

Diamantbollen was first awarded in 1990 in cooperation between the Swedish Football Association and the newspaper Arbetet until 2000. Since 2001, the awards has been awarded by the Swedish Football Association and Sydsvenskan. The precursor of this award, "Årets fotbollstjej" ("Soccer Girl of the Year"), was awarded by the Swedish Football Association and Dagens Nyheter from 1980 to 1989.

Since 2002, the recipient of the award has received a blown crystal structure designed by Melanie Rydoff. The award is in the shape of a kernel with smooth concave top. At the top of the award, there is a silver leaf. The logo and player name are made by calligrapher Gun Larson.

== Winners ==
=== Årets fotbollstjej award ===
Year	Player	Club(s)
1980	Anna Svenjeby	(Sweden) Kronängs IF
1981	Pia Sundhage	(Sweden) Jitex BK
1982	Anette Börjesson	(Sweden) Jitex BK
1983	Elisabeth Leidinge	(Sweden) Jitex BK
1984	Lena Videkull	(Sweden) Trollhättans IF
1985	Eva Andersson	(Sweden) GIF Sundsvall
1986	Gunilla Axén	(Sweden) Gideonsbergs IF
1987	Eleonor Hultin	(Sweden) GAIS
1988	Lena Videkull (2)	(Sweden) Öxabäcks IF
1989	Eleonor Hultin (2)	(Sweden) Jitex BK

=== Diamantbollen ===
Year	Player	Club(s)
1990	Eva Zeikfalvy	(Sweden) Malmö FF
1991	Elisabeth Leidinge (2)	(Sweden) Jitex BK
1992	Anneli Andelén	(Sweden) Öxabäck/Mark IF
1993	Lena Videkull (3)	(Sweden) Malmö FF
1994	Kristin Bengtsson	(Sweden) Hammarby IF
1995	Malin Andersson	(Sweden) Älvsjö AIK
1996	Malin Swedberg	(Sweden) Älvsjö AIK
1997	Ulrika Karlsson	(Sweden) Bälinge IF
1998	Victoria Svensson	(Sweden) Älvsjö AIK
1999	Cecilia Sandell	(Sweden) Älvsjö AIK
2000	Tina Nordlund	(Sweden) Umeå IK
2001	Malin Moström	(Sweden) Umeå IK
2002	Hanna Ljungberg	(Sweden) Umeå IK
2003	Victoria Svensson (2)	(Sweden) Djurgården/Älvsjö
2004	Kristin Bengtsson (2)	(Sweden) Djurgården/Älvsjö
2005	Hanna Marklund	(Sweden) Sunnanå SK
2006	Lotta Schelin	(Sweden) Kopparbergs/Göteborg FC
2007	Therese Sjögran	(Sweden) LdB FC Malmö
2008	Frida Östberg	(Sweden) Umeå IK
2009	Caroline Seger	(Sweden) Linköping FC
2010	Therese Sjögran (2)	(Sweden) LdB FC Malmö
2011	Lotta Schelin (2)	(France) Olympique Lyonnais
2012	Lotta Schelin (3)	(France) Olympique Lyonnais
2013	Lotta Schelin (4)	(France) Olympique Lyonnais
2014	Lotta Schelin (5)	(France) Olympique Lyonnais
2015	Hedvig Lindahl	(England) Chelsea
2016	Hedvig Lindahl (2)	(England) Chelsea
2017	Kosovare Asllani	(England) Manchester City (Sweden) Linköping FC
2018	Nilla Fischer	(Germany) VfL Wolfsburg
2019	Caroline Seger (2)	(Sweden) Rosengård
2020	Magdalena Eriksson	(England) Chelsea
2021	Fridolina Rolfö	(Spain) Barcelona
2022	Fridolina Rolfö (2)	(Spain) Barcelona
2023	Elin Rubensson	(Sweden) BK Häcken FF
2024	Johanna Rytting Kaneryd	(England) Chelsea
2025	Nathalie Björn	(England) Chelsea

== See also ==
- List of sports awards honoring women
