= Åge Storhaug =

Norwegian artistic gymnast

- Born: 5 April 1938 Klepp Municipality, Norway
- Died: 18 April 2012 (aged 74) Oslo, Norway
- Height: 1.76 m (5 ft 9 in)
- Relatives: Lars Storhaug (brother)

Gymnastics career
- Discipline: Men's artistic gymnastics
- Country represented: Norway
- Club: Klepp IL
Medal record
Men's artistic gymnastics
Representing Norway
European Championships
Silver medal – second place	1965 Antwerp	Vault

Åge Storhaug (5 April 1938 – 18 April 2012) was a Norwegian gymnast who competed from the late 1950s to the early 1970s.

He was born in Klepp Municipality and represented the club Klepp IL. He participated at the 1960 Summer Olympics and at the 1964 Summer Olympics. He won several Norwegian championships and Nordic championships. He coached the Norwegian national gymnastics team from 1973 to 1983.

He also participated in athletics, and had decent results in the pole vault and hurdles.

He died in 2012. He was a brother of politician Lars Storhaug.

== Works ==
- Med helskru! (1966)
