= Frigerio =

Frigerio is an Italian surname. Notable people with the surname include:

- Alessandro Frigerio (1914–1979), Swiss-Colombian footballer
- Andrea Frigerio (born 1961), Argentine actress
- Angelo Frigerio, Italian bobsledder
- Bartolomeo Frigerio (1585–1636), Italian Roman Catholic prelate
- Carlo Frigerio (1763–1800), Italian painter
- David Frigerio, American screenwriter
- Ezio Frigerio (1930–2022), Italian costume designer and art director
- Fausto Frigerio (born 1966), Italian hurdler and long jumper
- Federico Frigerio (born 1987), Argentine politician
- Luciano Frigerio (1928–1999), Italian designer, artist and musician
- Marta Lía Frigerio (1925–1985), Argentine writer better known as Marta Lynch
- Roberto Frigerio (1938–2023), Swiss footballer
- Rogelio Frigerio (born 1970), Argentine economist and politician
- Rogelio Julio Frigerio (1914–2006), Argentine economist, journalist and politician
- Ugo Frigerio (1901–1968), Italian race walker

== See also ==
- Cantono-Frigerio system, an Italian electric power supply for trolleybuses
