= Luciano Frigerio =

Italian designer, artist and musician (1928–1999)

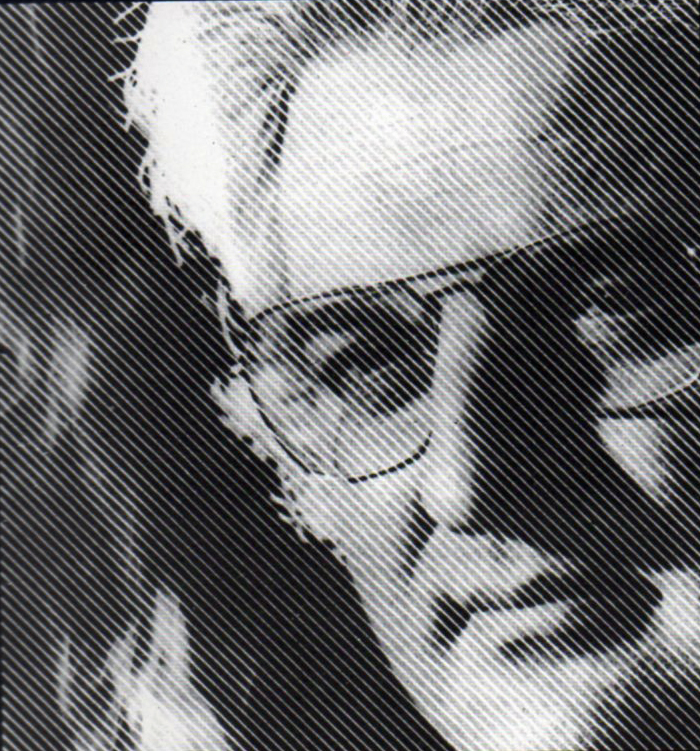
Circa 1989

Luciano Frigerio (Desio, 21 May 1928 – Sanremo, 11 April 1999) was a designer, artist and Italian musician.

== Biography ==
Luciano Frigerio was born in Desio in 1928, where his Father Giovanni set up a small workshop of highly crafted cabinet making in 1889. Luciano attended the junior school at the Collegio Paola di Rosa in Desio, where he met his school friend Tommaso Giussani, who later became a Monsignor in his ecclesiastical career. This close friendship and reciprocal esteem for each other grew over the years, and he was commissioned by the same Monsignor Giussani in 1982 to make two lecterns for Pope John XXIII, which can still be seen today in the Basilica di S. Pietro e Paolo in Roma, positioned under the altar of Bernini Bernini. Luciano Frigerio completed his technical and administrative studies at the Pio XI College, gaining his diploma in Accounting, while at the same time cultivating and combining his two great passions, which he had had since his adolescence, of designing furniture and composing music.

The piano played an important part in his life, meeting up with his musical friends became a real passion, taking along different pieces of jazz music, composing and listening to them, some interpreted and played by the flautist Severino Gazzelloni. In 1977, he was given the title of "Maestro Compositore"( Master Composer) and together with the registration in the Album, he obtained copyrights to his music, which was broadcast on the different RAI channels.

The socio-economic reality of Brianza, in those years, offered great entrepreneurial opportunities in the art of furniture. Already in the 1960s, it was common to order specialized reading material and magazines focused on the sector from the United States. Frequent visits to prestigious craftsmen’s studios like Canturine, where he often met Masters like Gio' Ponti, Franco Albini, Carlo De Carli and Tapio Wirkkala, brought about the transformation of his small family business into a company which was oriented to the International market (Frigerio di desio). In 1973, he was given the honorary title of Commendatore della Repubblica Italiana. One of the staff of technicians who worked in close collaboration with Frigerio helped him to realize his dream, which was to create a piece of furniture which was unique, made by putting together as many excellent materials as possible. From this idea, "Mobili Scultura" (furniture sculpture) was born, in solid wood and the headboards for "Letti scultura" (Bed Sculpture) in a fusion of bronze, which created a totally new style, standing out from the industrial production of that era.

Over the years, close collaboration was born with some famous architects and Italian designers like Franco Albini, Sergio Asti and later Paolo Portoghesi. Luciano Frigerio asked them to design some pieces of furniture in order to realize a craftsman’s studio, creating a series of numbered and signed pieces. He was totally convinced that even an architect could design furniture, a unique and highly crafted piece from a cabinet maker and not only furniture on an industrial scale. This philosophy brought about a growth in the company from the 70’s to the 90’s, with the opening of ten showrooms in the biggest Italian cities, one of which was in via Montenapoleone in Milano, where many Haute Culture Fashion Designers had costumier workshops. In 1989, he was nominated Cavaliere dell'Ordine Equestre del Santo Sepolcro di Gerusalemme. Many pieces of furniture designed by Luciano Frigerio are present in important Italian art galleries and abroad. He was recognized on various occasions during the International Italian Furniture Shows from 1975 to 1993, Mobillevante Bari from 1974 to 1983, Abitare il Tempo 1989-90-91-92. NelIn1972: NSID certification of trade membership, the National Society of interior designers. Permanent exhibition Milano: Galleria del Sagrato 1959-1963, Permanent exhibition Galleria Vittorio Emanuele 1964* 1967, Permanent exhibition "Art Gallery" via Montenapoleone 1968-1989. He died in Sanremo in 1999.

== Works ==
- Piece of furniture Norman, taken from the collection "Sculptura 99" (1966 * 1976)
- Collection "SCULPTURA 99"(1966–1976), Made up of 99 pieces represented by furniture realized with solid wood slats, portrayed as a sculpture. One of the most well-known pieces is the model Norman.
- Collection "IL MITO IN POLTRONA"( the myth in a chair)(1966–1976), are living room suites with solid wood structures and coverings sewn by Master saddlers and Master upholsterers, the armchair model Ussaro and the living room suites Can-Can-Can are examples of this.
- Collection "ULTRABRONZO 99"(1960–1970) Made up of 99 pieces in the form of bed headboards created with a fusion of bronze and solid copper. A collection of furniture accessories was produced, some of which were designed by Sergio Asti.
- Collection "GIO’FRIGERIO" (1968–1978), this represents the maximum of Italian design in high craftsmanship. Beds in metal designed also by Franco Albini and Sergio Asti.
- Collection "IL MOBILE INTARSIATO" (1975–1985), are pieces of furniture realized with polychromatic ligneous inlay work. Luciano Frigerio's great collection was inspired by architects and painters of the ‘900 likeLe Corbusier e Picasso. One of the most representative pieces is the model Jeanneret.

== Bibliography ==
- "Luciano Frigerio. I miei clienti sono collezionisti", My clients are collectors a cura di Giulio Confalonieri ed. 1972.
- "Sculpura 99 (sculpture 99) Luciano Frigerio", a cura di G. Comolli ed. 1974.
- "Galleria Frigerio"( Frigerio gallery), a cura di Studio CP2, ed. 1975.
- "Classici d'oggi antiquariato di domani"( classical today, antiques of tomorrow), a cura di Studio CP2, ed. 1975.
- "Cellini Arte antica bottega del mobile in pelle pergamena ( old furniture workshops in parchment leather) a cura di Studio CP2, ed. 1976.
- "Giò Frigerio - Il design Italiano nell’ alto artigianato"( Italian design in high craftsmanship), a cura di Studio CP2, ed. 1978.
- "Le vetrine di Milano",( the showcases of Milan) a cura di L'agrifoglio editore, ed. 1982.
- "1889* 1989 da 100 years with our hands", a cura di Frigerio di Desio ed. 1989.
- "Collezione Interiors Plus", a cura di Frigerio di Desio, ed. 1990.

== Discography ==
- Album "Ritratti in musica" Music by L. Frigerio e G. Galvagni, Amarcord Records 1982.
- Album "Concerto per una donna* Concert for a womanSeverino Gazzelloni" Orchestra Mario Rusca, Music by L. Frigerio e G. Galvagni, FonitCetra 1984.
- Album "Rapsodie", Music by L. Frigerio e G. Galvagni, Orchestra sinfonica dell’ Unione Musicisti di Roma – directed by Elvio Monti, Penta Phone 1988
