= Trude Stendal =

Norwegian footballer (born 1963)

Personal information
- Full name: Trude Margaret Stendal
- Date of birth: 30 May 1963 (age 63)
- Place of birth: Bergen, Norway
- Position: Forward

Youth career
- IL Sandviken

Senior career*
Years	Team	Apps	(Gls)
- IL Sandviken
- SK Sprint-Jeløy

International career^{‡}
1981–1990	Norway	32	(15)
Medal record
Norway
Winner	European Championship	1987
- * Club domestic league appearances and goals as of 15:22, 28 June 2014 (UTC) ‡ National team caps and goals as of 15:22, 28 June 2014 (UTC)

Trude Margaret Stendal (born 30 May 1963) is a Norwegian former footballer. She played as a forward for Toppserien club IL Sandviken and the Norway women's national football team. She scored twice in the Norwegians' 2–1 win over Sweden in the final of the 1987 European Competition for Women's Football. During her football career Stendal also worked in a bank. She trained as a nurse when injury brought about her premature retirement from football.

Stendal had injured her knee in a match against the United States a month after the Euro 1987 final. After making her comeback, she broke her leg in a 1991 Norwegian Women's Cup match against Trondheims-Ørn and was forced to retire.
