= Marie Françoise Sidibe =

French footballer (born 1962)

Personal information
- Date of birth: 22 September 1962 (age 64)
- Place of birth: Marseille, France
- Position: Midfielder

Senior career*
Years	Team	Apps	(Gls)
1978–1982	Marseille	10	(6)

International career
1979–1987	France	19	(1)
- * Club domestic league appearances and goals

Marie Françoise Sidibe is a retired French professional footballer who played as a Midfielder for French club Marseille and the France national team.

== International career ==
Sidibe represented France 19 times and scored 1 goals.
