= Nelly Sauter =

Swiss footballer (1959–2021)

Personal information
- Date of birth: 24 August 1959
- Place of birth: Uitikon, Switzerland
- Date of death: 7 July 2021 (aged 61)
- Position: Forward

Senior career*
| Years | Team | Apps | (Gls) |
- FC Bern

International career
| 1978–1992 | Switzerland | 55 | (8) |
- * Club domestic league appearances and goals

Nelly Sauter (24 August 1959 – 7 July 2021) was a Swiss footballer who was the first female Swiss player to play 50 times for the Switzerland women's national football team. Sauter won 11 Nationalliga A titles.

== International career ==
Sauter made her debut for the Swiss national team on 7 August 1978 against Scotland, and was the most capped female player for Switzerland for 20 years until she was by surpassed by Lara Dickenmann.

== Honours ==
DFC Bern

- Swiss Super League: 1991
- Swiss Cup: 1991

SV Seebach

- Swiss Super League: 1981, 1982, 1983, 1985, 1987, 1988, 1993, 1994, 1998
- Swiss Cup: 1981, 1987, 1988, 1993
