= Véronique Romagnoli =

French footballer (born 1966)

Personal information
- Date of birth: 11 July 1966 (age 60)
- Place of birth: Blois, France
- Position: Forward

Senior career*
Years	Team	Apps	(Gls)
1978–1984	A.A.J. Blois		

International career
1982–1989	France	17	(3)
- * Club domestic league appearances and goals

Véronique Romagnoli is a retired French professional footballer who played as a forward for French club A.A.J. Blois and the France national team.

== International career ==
Romagnoli represented France 17 times and scored 3 goals.
