= Ágnes Bárfy =

Hungarian footballer (born 1958)

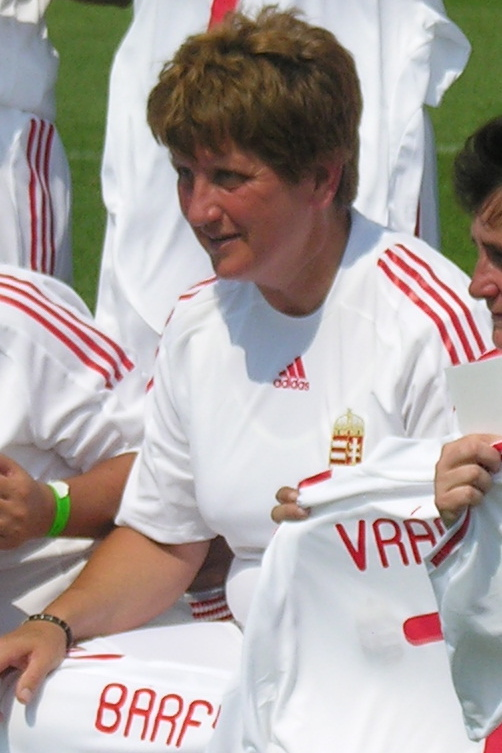
- Ágnes Bárfy in 2017

Personal information
- Date of birth: 29 November 1958 (age 67)
- Place of birth: Budapest, Hungary
- Position: Midfielder

International career
Years	Team	Apps	(Gls)
1985–1996	Hungary	79	(15)

Ágnes Bárfy (born 20 November 1958) is a retired footballer who played as a midfielder for AES Spartacus. She participated in the first official Hungary women's national team match in 1985 against West Germany.

== International career ==
Ágnes Bárfy made 79 appearances for the national team and scored 15 goals.

== Personal life ==
Ágnes Bárfy is the daughter of former football player Antal Bárfy.

== Honours ==
- Hungarian Women's League: 1989–90, 1991–92, 1992–93
