= Lars Storhaug =

Norwegian politician

- Born: 28 September 1935 (age 90); Klepp Municipality, Norway
- Occupation: Politician
- Political party: Conservative
- Children: Bjørg Storhaug
- Relatives: Åge Storhaug

Lars Storhaug (born 28 September 1935) is a Norwegian farmer and politician.

== Biography ==
Storhaug was born in Klepp Municipality to farmers Lars Storhaug Sr. (1898–1977) and Borghild née Skadsem (1914–2000). He was elected representative to the Storting from Rogaland for the period 1985–1989 for the Conservative Party.

He was a brother of Åge Storhaug.
