= Ida Golin =

Italian footballer (1959–2025)

Personal information
- Date of birth: 16 December 1959
- Place of birth: Ivrea, Italy
- Date of death: July 2025 (aged 65)
- Position: Forward

Senior career*
Years	Team	Apps	(Gls)
- Modena
- Lazio

International career
1976–1987	Italy	41	(27)
- * Club domestic league appearances and goals

Ida Golin (16 December 1959 – July 2025) was an Italian footballer who played as a forward for Lazio. She had 41 caps for the Italy national team and scored 27 goals. Golin died in July 2025, at the age of 65.

== Honours ==
Lazio

- Serie A: 1980, 1987–88

Italy

- UEFA Women's Championship third place: 1987
