= Gunilla Axén =

Swedish footballer

Personal information
- Full name: Gunilla Sonja Eva Axén
- Date of birth: 27 October 1966 (age 60)
- Place of birth: Eskilstuna, Sweden
- Position: Striker

Youth career
- Hällbybrunns IF

Senior career*
Years	Team	Apps	(Gls)
1981–1989	Gideonsbergs IF	125	(127)

International career^{‡}
1984–1988	Sweden	29	(11)
- * Club domestic league appearances and goals as of 23:59, 6 June 2013 (UTC) ‡ National team caps and goals as of 23:59, 6 June 2013 (UTC)

Gunilla Sonja Eva Axén (born 27 October 1966) is a Swedish former footballer. She played as a striker for Gideonsbergs IF and the Sweden women's national football team. Axén is employed as a development manager for the Swedish Football Association (SvFF).

== Club career ==
In 1986 Axén won the Årets Fotbollstjej award, the forerunner of the Diamantbollen. That season she had also been the Swedish League's top goal-scorer with 22 goals.

In 1989 an anterior cruciate ligament injury sustained on the artificial turf at Tipshallen in Jönköping ended Axén's playing career early. She had reportedly been attracting interest from professional clubs in the Italian Serie A.

== International career ==
Axén made her senior Sweden debut in the semi-final of the 1984 European Competition for Women's Football, against Italy in Linköping. Sweden won 2–1 after two goals by Pia Sundhage. Axén was included in the squad who defeated England in the final.

In the semi-final of the 1987 European Competition for Women's Football in Moss, substitute Axén scored twice against England as Sweden won 3–2 after extra time. At the 1988 FIFA Women's Invitation Tournament in Guangdong she was part of the Swedish squad who finished runners-up to Norway.

== International goals ==
No.	Date	Venue	Opponent	Score	Result	Competition
1.	11 June 1985	Helsingborg, Sweden	Netherlands	2–0	2–0	1987 European Competition for Women's Football qualifying
2.	17 May 1986	Karlskoga, Sweden	France	1–0	1–0	1987 European Competition for Women's Football qualifying
3.	18 September 1986	Veszprém, Hungary	Hungary	2–0	4–1	Friendly
4.	18 September 1986	Veszprém, Hungary	Hungary	3–1	4–1	Friendly
5.	1 October 1986	Aalst, Belgium	Belgium	1–0	2–1	1987 European Competition for Women's Football qualifying
6.	11 June 1987	Moss, Norway	England	2–2	3–2 (a.e.t.)	1987 European Competition for Women's Football
7.	11 June 1987	Moss, Norway	England	3–2	3–2 (a.e.t.)	1987 European Competition for Women's Football
8.	7 July 1987	Blaine, United States	China	3–0	6–0	Friendly
9.	7 July 1987	Blaine, United States	China	4–0	6–0	Friendly
10.	19 August 1987	Nyköping, Sweden	Hungary	2–0	5–0	Friendly
11.	7 May 1988	Dublin, Ireland	Republic of Ireland	1–0	1–1	1989 European Competition for Women's Football qualifying

== Personal life ==
Axén is married to Anders Wengrud, who was also a footballer and football coach. She has a son named Pontus. In 2003 Axén was appointed to a senior development role in the Swedish Football Association (SvFF).
