= 1987 European Competition for Women's Football =

Europamesterskapet i fotball for kvinner 1987

Tournament details
- Host country: Norway
- Dates: 11–14 June
- Teams: 4
- Venues: 3 (in 3 host cities)

Final positions
- Champions: Norway (1st title)
- Runners-up: Sweden
- Third place: Italy
- Fourth place: England

Tournament statistics
- Matches played: 4
- Goals scored: 13 (3.25 per match)
- Attendance: 14,428 (3,607 per match)
- Top scorer: (Norway) Trude Stendal (3 goals)
- Best player: (Norway) Heidi Støre

The 1987 European Competition for Women's Football took place in Norway. It was won by the hosts in a final against defending champions Sweden. Once again, the competition began with four qualifying groups, but this time a host nation was selected for the semi-final stage onwards after the four semi-finalists were identified.

== Squads ==
For a list of all squads that played in the final tournament, see 1987 European Competition for Women's Football squads

== Bracket ==
Semi-finals
11 June – Oslo
Norway	2
Italy	0
11 June – Moss
Sweden (a.e.t.)	3
England	2

Final
14 June – Oslo
Norway	2
Sweden	1
Third place play-off
13 June – Drammen
Italy	2
England	1

== Semifinals ==
11 June 1987

Norway	2–0	Italy
Stendal 40'; Støre 73'	Report; FIGC Report (in Italian); NFF Report (in Norwegian); Report

Ullevaal Stadion, Oslo
Attendance: 5,154
Referee: Eysteinn Guðmundsson (Iceland)
11 June 1987

Sweden	3–2 (a.e.t.)	England
Börjesson 32'; Axén 50', 100'	Report; SvFF Report (in Swedish); Report	Sherrard 35'; Davis 43'

Melløs Stadion, Moss
Attendance: 300
Referee: Michał Listkiewicz (Poland)

== Third place playoff ==
13 June 1987

Italy	2–1	England
Morace 36'; Vignotto 50'	Report; FIGC Report (in Italian); Report	Davis 4' (pen.)

Marienlyst Stadion, Drammen
Attendance: 504
Referee: Peter Mikkelsen (Denmark)

== Final ==
14 June 1987

Norway	2–1	Sweden
Stendal 28', 72'	NFF Report (in Norwegian); SvFF Report (in Swedish); Report	Videkull 73'

Ullevaal Stadion, Oslo
Attendance: 8,408
Referee: Eero Aho (Finland)

== Goalscorers ==
3 goals

- (Norway) Trude Stendal

2 goals

- (Sweden) Gunilla Axén
- (England) Kerry Davis

1 goal

- (England) Jackie Sherrard
- (Italy) Carolina Morace
- (Italy) Elisabetta Vignotto
- (Norway) Heidi Støre
- (Sweden) Anette Börjesson
- (Sweden) Lena Videkull
