= Norway women's national football team =

Norway
- Association: Norwegian Football Federation (Norges Fotballforbund)
- Confederation: UEFA (Europe)
- Head coach: Gemma Grainger
- Captain: Ada Hegerberg
- Most caps: Hege Riise (188)
- Top scorer: Isabell Herlovsen (67)
- FIFA code: NOR
First colours	Second colours

FIFA ranking
- Current: 13 ▲1 (20 October 2026)
- Highest: 2 (July – August 2003)
- Lowest: 16 (December 2023 – December 2024; June 2025)

First international
- Sweden 2–1 Norway (Kolding, Denmark; 7 July 1978)

Biggest win
- Norway 17–0 Slovakia (Ulefoss, Norway; 19 September 1995)

Biggest defeat
- England 8–0 Norway (Falmer, England; 11 July 2022)

World Cup
- Appearances: 9 (first in 1991)
- Best result: Champions (1995)

Olympic Games
- Appearances: 3 (first in 1996)
- Best result: Gold medalists (2000)

European Championship
- Appearances: 13 (first in 1987)
- Best result: Champions (1987, 1993)
Medal record
FIFA Women's World Cup
Gold medal – first place	1995 Sweden	Team
Silver medal – second place	1991 China	Team
UEFA Women's Championship
Gold medal – first place	1987 Norway	Team
Gold medal – first place	1993 Italy	Team
Silver medal – second place	1989 West Germany	Team
Silver medal – second place	1991 Denmark	Team
Silver medal – second place	2005 England	Team
Silver medal – second place	2013 Sweden	Team
Summer Olympics
Gold medal – first place	2000 Sydney	Team
Bronze medal – third place	1996 Atlanta	Team

The Norway women's national football team (Norwegian: Norges kvinnelandslag i fotball) represents Norway in international football, and is controlled by the Norwegian Football Federation. The team is former European, World and Olympic champions and thus one of the most successful national teams. The team has achieved less success since the 2011 FIFA Women's World Cup. The best result since then was in the UEFA Women's Euro 2013, when they were runners-up.

== History ==
Norway women's national football team emerged in 1978 for the Nordic Championship tournament. Having little culture for official clubs and a series system, their early history consisted of losing to their neighbors and eventually beating Northern Ireland for their first win.

=== A power to be reckoned with ===
Norway's women's national football team rose in success throughout Europe. They beat England, France and Switzerland. In the first qualification for the European Competition for Representative Women's Teams (later renamed UEFA Women's Championship), Norway played opposite Sweden, Finland and Iceland. Norway lost both matches against Sweden, but beat Finland in both matches against them. Sweden later won the Euros.

=== The start of the golden years ===
Norway later lost 0–5 against Denmark. Norway beat Denmark and West Germany in the qualification for the 1987 Euros. Norway was the host for the four matches. Norway beat Italy in the semifinals and met Sweden in the finals, where they won 2–1 and claimed their first title.

Norway beat Sweden again in a final in 1988 FIFA Women's Invitation Tournament, in China. At the 1989 Euros, Norway made the finals against West Germany, but lost 1–4. After that loss, the coaches resigned, leaving the helm to Even Pellerud, who saw Norway progress to the 1991 FIFA Women's World Cup. Before the first official world cup, Norway made it to the fourth (and Norway's third in a row) final of the Euros, where Norway again met Germany, who won in extra time. In the World Cup, Norway made it to the finals, where they lost to the United States women's national soccer team.

Following that, Pellerud led the team to the 1993 Euros. Norway beat Denmark in the semifinals and Italy in the finals, winning their second Euros. Norway followed up with winning the inaugural edition of 1994 Algarve Cup.

=== World Champions and beyond ===
In the 1995 World Cup in Sweden, Norway won all their matches in the group stage. In the quarter-finals Norway won 3–1 score against Denmark. In the semifinals, Norway won 1–0 score against the US and reached the finals against Germany. Having lost two Euro finals, Norway were not among the favourites, but they defeated Germany by two goals scored within the space of four minutes, becoming world champions. Pellerud resigned shortly afterwards.

The first women's football in the Olympic Games was considered equal with the World Cup in rank. Norway qualified automatically because of their win in the World Cup. Norway drew with Brazil, and beat Germany and Japan, proceeding to the semi-finals. There they lost to the US after extra time, but won the bronze medal after defeating Brazil.

At the 1997 Euros, Norway only made it to the semi-finals. Norway eased through to the 1999 FIFA Women's World Cup, where they beat all their opposition in the group stage. They met Sweden in the quarter-finals and won with 3–1, but lost in the semifinals to China, who won 0–5. In the bronze final, Norway lost to Brazil on penalties.

Before the 2000 Olympics, Norway set its own attendance record at Ullevaal Stadion, when a crowd of 15,762 witnessed a 2–1 victory over the United States. Norway was not among the biggest favourites to win the Sydney Olympics. They started off losing to the US, but picked up by beating Nigeria and China, the latter by one goal. In the semi-finals, Norway beat Germany with a goal by Tina Wunderlich after Germany pressed the Norwegians for the better part of the match. The final saw Norway against the US in the match. Tiffeny Milbrett took the lead for the US, but Norway equaled the score by Gro Espeseth. Norway took the lead in the match via a header by Ragnhild Gulbrandsen, but Milbrett scored in stoppage time to prolong the match to extra time with golden goal. Norway scored the winner. The coach Per-Mathias Høgmo quit after achieving this feat.

=== Decline ===
Åge Steen took over as coach, but under his tutelage, things went from top to mediocre. At the 2001 Euros, Norway's play was lackluster, and while making it to the semi-finals, Norway lost to Germany. In the 2003 World Cup, Norway lost 1–4 to Brazil in the group stage before losing to US in the quarter-finals. As Greece was arranging the 2004 Summer Olympics, there were only two additional spots for European teams which were taken by Sweden and Germany, who had both proceeded to the finals. Steen continued for another year, as stipulated by his contract, but was replaced in late 2004.

=== Brief recovery ===
Under the new coach, Bjarne Berntsen, Norway reached the final of the 2005 Euros with a 3–2 win over Sweden in extra time in the semifinal. Germany again defeated Norway to win the championship. Norway continued to achieve reasonable results except in the Algarve Cup where the results started to slip.

Norway qualified for the 2007 FIFA Women's World Cup in China. They drew with Australia and narrowly beat Canada, and then a 7–2 win over Ghana took them to the top of their group. Norway then progressed further by beating China 1–0, but lost 0–3 to Germany in the semifinal. In the bronze final, Norway lost 1–4 to the US to finish in fourth place in the World Cup, which qualified them to enter the Beijing Olympics. Norway's top scorer Ragnhild Gulbrandsen was awarded the Bronze Boot behind Marta of Brazil and Abby Wambach of the United States.

At the 2008 Olympics, Norway beat the US, then lost to Japan 1–5 and went out in the quarter-finals against Brazil, where they lost with the score of 1–2. Following the end of the tournament, after returning to Oslo from China, Berntsen was criticized for telling Lise Klaveness that she had no future in the national team under his tutelage, a gross error that he later admitted. Two months later, in October, five players refused to play for the national team, saying that playing under Berntsen was too much of a burden. With a reduced team, and after some less controversial resignations, Norway produced a relatively good result at the 2009 UEFA Women's Championship by beating Sweden 3–1 in the quarter-finals, losing 0–4 against Germany and a modest 1–0 against Iceland and 1–1 against France. After the championship, Berntsen's contract ended.

=== Landsem ===
Eli Landsem, the first woman coach and the first coach with experience of coaching women's football, took over at the end of 2009. Under her tutelage, some of the players who had previously elected not to play returned. The team qualified to play in the 2011 FIFA World Cup after winning all but one of the matches in their qualification group. Norway however failed to reach the quarter-finals for the first time in its history after losing to Brazil (0–3) and Australia (1–2). As a result, they also failed to qualify for the 2012 Summer Olympics.

The next task was qualification to the 2013 European Cup competition, with Norway in Group 3 with Iceland, Northern Ireland, Belgium, Hungary and Bulgaria. The team initially lost 3–1 to Iceland and Northern Ireland, but in 2012 the position was recovered with wins in the last six matches, and Norway finished top of Group 3 with eight wins from ten matches. They later went on to finish as runners-up in the finals in Sweden.

=== Struggle ===
At the 2015 FIFA Women's World Cup, Norway was drawn into a group with Germany, Thailand and the Ivory Coast. Norway performed well in the group stage, as the team beat Thailand 4–0 and the Ivory Coast 3–1. They drew 1–1 against former champions Germany. Norway lost 2–1 in the round of sixteen to England, who went on to win the bronze medal.

=== 2016–2018 ===
Martin Sjögren became the new coach of Norway at the end of 2016. He had previous coaching experience in the Damallsvenskan with Linköping and LdB FC Malmö (now known as FC Rosengård).

Norway qualified for Euro 2017 without losing a game. They were drawn into Group A alongside the Netherlands, Belgium and Denmark, but lost all three group games without scoring a goal.

In 2017, Norway striker and 2016 UEFA Women's Player of the Year Ada Hegerberg decided to stop representing the national team as a form of protest due to a dispute with the Norwegian Football Federation about how they treat women's football. Hegerberg eventually returned to the national team five years later in March 2022. Her protest led to Norwegian Football Federation in October 2017 to pay Norway's male and female players equally, with the men making a contribution to the women's team. This equalled nearly a fifty percent increase in compensation for the women.

In the 2019 UEFA World Cup Qualifications, Norway defeated the Netherlands with the score of 2–1 in their final group game on 4 September 2018. As a result, Norway won qualifying Group 3 and secured an automatic berth in the 2019 World Cup, while the Netherlands, who won Euro 2017, were forced to go to the play-off.

=== Euro 2022 ===
In their Euro 2022 group stage match against England, the host country of the competition and eventual champions, on 11 July, Norway lost 8–0. Norway was eliminated after the first round after losing the final Group A match against Austria (0–1), having won only one match, in the opening match against Northern Ireland (4–1).

=== 2023 World Cup ===
In the 2023 World Cup group stage, Norwegian team were defeated by hosts New Zealand (0–1) and reached a draw with Switzerland (0–0). Norway managed to qualify by finishing second in their group thanks to 6–0 victory over the Philippines, who were new to the competition, beating New Zealand on overall goal difference, who also had 4 points. Norway was eliminated in the Round of 16 by Japan (1–3).

== All-time record ==
Competition	Stage	Result	Opponent	Position / Notes
1984 EC QS	GS: Gr.1	2–2 / 1–0	Iceland	2 / 4
1984 EC QS	GS: Gr.1	3–0 / 3–0	Finland	2 / 4
1984 EC QS	GS: Gr.1	0–2 / 1–2	Sweden	2 / 4
1987 EC QS	GS: Gr.1	0–0 / 2–0	Finland	1 / 4
1987 EC QS	GS: Gr.1	3–2 / 0–0	West Germany	1 / 4
1987 EC QS	GS: Gr.1	2–2 / 5–2	Denmark	1 / 4
(Norway) 1987 EC	SF	2–0	Italy	Advanced
(Norway) 1987 EC	F	2–1	Sweden	Champions
1989 EC QS	GS: Gr.3	3–3 / 0–2	Finland	2 / 4
1989 EC QS	GS: Gr.3	0–1 / 1–2	Denmark	2 / 4
1989 EC QS	GS: Gr.3	2–0 / 3–1	England	2 / 4
1989 EC QS	QF	2–1 / 3–0	Netherlands	Qualified
(West Germany) 1989 EC	SF	2–1	Sweden	Advanced
(West Germany) 1989 EC	F	1–4	West Germany	Runners-up
1991 EC QS	GS: Gr.3	1–0 / 4–0	Finland	1 / 4
1991 EC QS	GS: Gr.3	4–0 / 1–0	Belgium	1 / 4
1991 EC QS	GS: Gr.3	2–0 / 0–0	England	1 / 4
1991 EC QS	QF	2–1 / 2–0	Hungary	Qualified
(Denmark) 1991 EC	SF	0–0 (8–7 p)	Denmark	Advanced
(Denmark) 1991 EC	F	1–3 (a.e.t.)	Germany	Runners-up
(China) 1991 WC	GS: Gr.1	0–4	China	2 / 4
(China) 1991 WC	GS: Gr.1	4–0	New Zealand	2 / 4
(China) 1991 WC	GS: Gr.1	2–1	Denmark	2 / 4
(China) 1991 WC	QF	3–2	Italy	Advanced
(China) 1991 WC	SF	4–1	Sweden	Advanced
(China) 1991 WC	F	1–2	United States	Runners-up
1993 EC QS	GS: Gr.1	10–0 / 6–0	Switzerland	1 / 3
1993 EC QS	GS: Gr.1	0–0 / 8–0	Belgium	1 / 3
1993 EC QS	QF	3–0 / 3–0	Netherlands	Qualified
(Italy) 1993 EC	SF	1–0	Denmark	Champions
(Italy) 1993 EC	F	1–0	Italy	Champions
1995 EC QS	GS: Gr.1	6–1 / 9–0	Czech Republic	1 / 4
1995 EC QS	GS: Gr.1	8–0 / 4–0	Hungary	1 / 4
1995 EC QS	GS: Gr.1	2–2 / 4–0	Finland	1 / 4
1995 EC QS	QF	3–1 / 4–2	Italy	Qualified
1995 EC	SF	4–3 / 1–4	Sweden	Eliminated
(Sweden) 1995 WC	GS: Gr.2	8–0	Nigeria	1 / 4
(Sweden) 1995 WC	GS: Gr.2	2–0	England	1 / 4
(Sweden) 1995 WC	GS: Gr.2	7–0	Canada	1 / 4
(Sweden) 1995 WC	QF	3–1	Denmark	Advanced
(Sweden) 1995 WC	SF	1–0	United States	Advanced
(Sweden) 1995 WC	F	2–0	Germany	Champions
(United States) 1996 SO	GS: Gr.1	2–2	Brazil	1 / 4
(United States) 1996 SO	GS: Gr.1	3–2	Germany	1 / 4
(United States) 1996 SO	GS: Gr.1	4–0	Japan	1 / 4
(United States) 1996 SO	SF	1–2	United States	Eliminated
(United States) 1996 SO	BM	2–0	Brazil	Third place
1997 EC QS	GS: Gr.1 (Class A)	17–0 / 4–0	Slovakia	1 / 4
1997 EC QS	GS: Gr.1 (Class A)	3–1 / 0–0	Germany	1 / 4
1997 EC QS	GS: Gr.1 (Class A)	2–0 / 7–0	Finland	1 / 4
(Norway) (Sweden) 1997 EC	GS: Gr.2	5–0	Denmark	3 / 4
(Norway) (Sweden) 1997 EC	GS: Gr.2	0–0	Germany	3 / 4
(Norway) (Sweden) 1997 EC	GS: Gr.2	0–2	Italy	3 / 4
1999 WC QS	GS: Gr.3 (Class A)	6–1 / 0–0	Netherlands	1 / 4
1999 WC QS	GS: Gr.3 (Class A)	0–1 / 3–2	Germany	1 / 4
1999 WC QS	GS: Gr.3 (Class A)	2–1 / 2–0	England	1 / 4
(United States) 1999 WC	GS: Gr.3	2–1	Russia	1 / 4
(United States) 1999 WC	GS: Gr.3	7–1	Canada	1 / 4
(United States) 1999 WC	GS: Gr.3	4–0	Japan	1 / 4
(United States) 1999 WC	QF	3–1	Sweden	Advanced
(United States) 1999 WC	SF	0–5	China	Eliminated
(United States) 1999 WC	3P	0–0 (4–5 p)	Brazil	Fourth place
(Australia) 2000 SO	GS: Gr.2	0–2	United States	2 / 4
(Australia) 2000 SO	GS: Gr.2	3–1	Nigeria	2 / 4
(Australia) 2000 SO	GS: Gr.2	2–1	China	2 / 4
(Australia) 2000 SO	SF	1–0	Germany	Advanced
(Australia) 2000 SO	F	3–2	United States	Champions
2001 EC QS	GS: Gr.2 (Class A)	4–0 / 1–0	Switzerland	1 / 4
2001 EC QS	GS: Gr.2 (Class A)	4–0 / 5–0	Portugal	1 / 4
2001 EC QS	GS: Gr.2 (Class A)	3–0 / 8–0	England	1 / 4
(Germany) 2001 EC	Gr.2	3–0	France	2 / 4
(Germany) 2001 EC	Gr.2	1–1	Italy	2 / 4
(Germany) 2001 EC	Gr.2	0–1	Denmark	2 / 4
(Germany) 2001 EC	SF	0–1	Germany	Eliminated
2003 WC QS	GS: Gr.1 (Class A)	4–0 / 1–1	Ukraine	1 / 4
2003 WC QS	GS: Gr.1 (Class A)	5–0 / 5–1	Czech Republic	1 / 4
2003 WC QS	GS: Gr.1 (Class A)	3–0 / 3–1	France	1 / 4
(United States) 2003 WC	Gr.B	2–0	France	2/4
(United States) 2003 WC	Gr.B	1–4	Brazil	2/4
(United States) 2003 WC	Gr.B	7–1	South Korea	2/4
(United States) 2003 WC	QF	0–1	(United States) USA	Eliminated
2005 EC QS	GS: Gr.2 (Class A)	6–0 6–1	Belgium	2 / 5
2005 EC QS	GS: Gr.2 (Class A)	2–0 2–0	Netherlands	2 / 5
2005 EC QS	GS: Gr.2 (Class A)	1–1 1–2	Denmark	2 / 5
2005 EC QS	GS: Gr.2 (Class A)	2–0 2–0	Spain	2 / 5
2005 EC QS	Play-offs	7–2 2–1	Iceland	
(England) 2005 EC	GS: Gr.2	0–1	Germany	2 / 4
(England) 2005 EC	GS: Gr.2	1–1	France	2 / 4
(England) 2005 EC	GS: Gr.2	5–3	Italy	2 / 4
(England) 2005 EC	SF	3–2	Sweden	
(England) 2005 EC	F	1–3	Germany	
2007 WC QS	GS: Gr.1 (Class A)	4–1 1–1	Ukraine	1 / 5
2007 WC QS	GS: Gr.1 (Class A)	4–0 3–0	Serbia	1 / 5
2007 WC QS	GS: Gr.1 (Class A)	1–0 2–1	Italy	1 / 5
2007 WC QS	GS: Gr.1 (Class A)	3–0 4–0	Greece	1 / 5
(China) 2007 WC	Gr.C	2–1	Canada	1 / 4
(China) 2007 WC	Gr.C	1–1	Australia	1 / 4
(China) 2007 WC	Gr.C	7–2	Ghana	1 / 4
(China) 2007 WC	QF	1–0	China	
(China) 2007 WC	SF	0–3	Germany	
(China) 2007 WC	3P	1–4	United States	
(China) 2008 SO	Gr.3	2–0	United States	2 / 4
(China) 2008 SO	Gr.3	1–0	New Zealand	2 / 4
(China) 2008 SO	Gr.3	1–5	Japan	2 / 4
(China) 2008 SO	QF	1–2	Brazil	
2009 EC QS	GS: Gr.6	3–0 7–0	Israel	1 / 5
2009 EC QS	GS: Gr.6	3–0 4–0	Austria	1 / 5
2009 EC QS	GS: Gr.6	3–0 0–0	Russia	1 / 5
2009 EC QS	GS: Gr.6	3–0 3–0	Poland	1 / 5
(Finland) 2009 EC	GS: Gr.2	0–4	Germany	3 / 4
(Finland) 2009 EC	GS: Gr.2	1–0	Iceland	3 / 4
(Finland) 2009 EC	GS: Gr.2	1–1	France	3 / 4
(Finland) 2009 EC	QF	3–1	Sweden	
(Finland) 2009 EC	SF	1–3	Germany	
2011 WC QS	GS: Gr.2	3–0 2–2	Netherlands	1 / 5
2011 WC QS	GS: Gr.2	1–0 4–0	Slovakia	1 / 5
2011 WC QS	GS: Gr.2	14–0 7–0	(North Macedonia) Macedonia	1 / 5
2011 WC QS	GS: Gr.2	5–0 3–0	Belarus	1 / 5
2011 WC QS	Play-offs	1–0 2–0	Ukraine	
(Germany) 2011 WC	GS: Gr.D	1–0	Equatorial Guinea	3 / 4
(Germany) 2011 WC	GS: Gr.D	0–3	Brazil	3 / 4
(Germany) 2011 WC	GS: Gr.D	1–2	Australia	3 / 4
2013 EC QS	GS: Gr.3	1–3 2–1	Iceland	1 / 6
2013 EC QS	GS: Gr.3	6–0 5–0	Hungary	1 / 6
2013 EC QS	GS: Gr.3	1–0 3–0	Belgium	1 / 6
2013 EC QS	GS: Gr.3	1–3 2–0	Northern Ireland	1 / 6
2013 EC QS	GS: Gr.3	3–0 11–0	Bulgaria	1 / 6
(Sweden) 2013 EC	GS: Gr.B	1–1	Iceland	1 / 4
(Sweden) 2013 EC	GS: Gr.B	1–0	Netherlands	1 / 4
(Sweden) 2013 EC	GS: Gr.B	1–0	Germany	1 / 4
(Sweden) 2013 EC	QF	3–1	Spain	
(Sweden) 2013 EC	SF	1–1	Denmark	
(Sweden) 2013 EC	F	0–1	Germany	
2015 WC QS	GS: Gr.5	4–1 2–1	Belgium	1 / 6
2015 WC QS	GS: Gr.5	7–0 11–0	Albania	1 / 6
2015 WC QS	GS: Gr.5	2–1 0–2	Netherlands	1 / 6
2015 WC QS	GS: Gr.5	5–0 6–0	Greece	1 / 6
2015 WC QS	GS: Gr.5	2–0 2–0	Portugal	1 / 6
(Canada) 2015 WC	GS: Gr.B	4–0	Thailand	2 / 4
(Canada) 2015 WC	GS: Gr.B	1–1	Germany	2 / 4
(Canada) 2015 WC	GS: Gr.B	3–1	Ivory Coast	2 / 4
(Canada) 2015 WC	Round of 16	1–2	England	
2017 EC QS	GS: Gr.8	1–0 2–2	Austria	1 / 5
2017 EC QS	GS: Gr.8	1–0 5–0	Israel	1 / 5
2017 EC QS	GS: Gr.8	4–0 10–0	Kazakhstan	1 / 5
2017 EC QS	GS: Gr.8	4–0 2–0	Wales	1 / 5
(Netherlands) 2017 EC	GS: Gr.A	0–1	Netherlands	4 / 4
(Netherlands) 2017 EC	GS: Gr.A	0–2	Belgium	4 / 4
(Netherlands) 2017 EC	GS: Gr.A	0–1	Denmark	4 / 4
(France) 2019 WC	GS: Gr.A	3–0	Nigeria	2 / 4
(France) 2019 WC	GS: Gr.A	1–2	France	2 / 4
(France) 2019 WC	GS: Gr.A	2–1	South Korea	2 / 4
(France) 2019 WC	Round of 16	1–1 (4–1 p)	Australia	
(France) 2019 WC	QF	0–3	England	
(Australia) (New Zealand) 2023 WC	GS: Gr.A	0–1	New Zealand	2 / 4
(Australia) (New Zealand) 2023 WC	GS: Gr.A	0–0	Switzerland	2 / 4
(Australia) (New Zealand) 2023 WC	GS: Gr.A	6–0	Philippines	2 / 4
(Australia) (New Zealand) 2023 WC	Round of 16	1–3	Japan	

== Results and fixtures ==
The following is a list of match results in the last 12 months, as well as any future matches that have been scheduled.

Legend

Win Draw Loss Fixture

=== 2025 ===
28 November Friendly	Norway	3–1	Brazil	La Línea, Spain
19:00 UTC+1	Gaupset 11', 53'; Hegerberg 69' (pen.)	Report	Mariza 44'	Stadium: Estadio Municipal de La Línea; Referee: Frederikke Lydia Søkjær (Denmark)

1 December Friendly	Norway	0–0	Denmark	La Línea, Spain
18:00 UTC+1		Report		Stadium: Estadio Municipal de La Línea; Referee: Hanna Laajanen (Denmark)

=== 2026 ===
3 March 2027 FIFA Women's World Cup qualification	Austria	0–1	Norway	Maria Enzersdorf, Austria
18:00 UTC+1		Report	Naalsund 81'	Stadium: Datenpol Arena; Attendance: 1,480; Referee: Kirsty Dowle (England)

7 March 2027 FIFA Women's World Cup qualification	Norway	0–4	Germany	Stavanger, Norway
18:00 UTC+1		Report	Senß 18'; Wamser 45+1'; Endemann 45+4'; Brand 58'	Stadium: Lyse Arena; Attendance: 8,532; Referee: Stéphanie Frappart (France)

14 April 2027 FIFA Women's World Cup qualification	Norway	5–0	Slovenia	Lillestrøm, Norway
18:00 UTC+2	Hegerberg 45+2', 88'; Blakstad 69'; Graham Hansen 76'; Sævik 86'	Report		Stadium: Åråsen Stadion; Attendance: 3,658; Referee: Martina Molinaro (Italy)

18 April 2027 FIFA Women's World Cup qualification	Slovenia	2–3	Norway	Ptuj, Slovenia
17:00 UTC+2	Zver 43', 70' (pen.)	Report	Hegerberg 36'; Jensen 66'; Gaupset 90+2'	Stadium: Ptuj City Stadium; Attendance: 631; Referee: Rasa Grigonė (Lithuania)

5 June 2027 FIFA Women's World Cup qualification	Germany	2–0	Norway	Cologne, Germany
20:35 UTC+2	Müller 18'; Wamser 27'	Report		Stadium: RheinEnergieStadion; Attendance: 33,425; Referee: Marta Huerta De Aza (Spain)

9 June 2027 FIFA Women's World Cup qualification	Norway	2–1	Austria	Oslo, Norway
18:00 UTC+2	Bjelde 46'; Graham Hansen 48'	Report	Dunst 51'	Stadium: Ullevaal Stadion; Attendance: 7,256; Referee: Ivana Projkovska (North Macedonia)

9 October 2027 FIFA Women's World Cup play-offs	Romania	0–2	Norway	Bucharest, Romania
20:00 UTC+3		Report	Reiten 10'; Maanum 34'	Stadium: Arcul de Triumf Stadium; Referee: Emily Heaslip (England)

13 October 2027 FIFA Women's World Cup play-offs	Norway	6–0 (8–0 agg.)	Romania	Oslo, Norway
18:00 UTC+2	Jensen 3'; Terland 9', 12', 54' (pen.); Østenstad 66'; Blakstad 70'	Report		Stadium: Ullevaal Stadion; Referee: Olivia Tschon (Austria)

1 December 2027 FIFA Women's World Cup play-offs	Wales	v	Norway	Wales
--:-- UTC+0

5 December 2027 FIFA Women's World Cup play-offs	Norway	v	Wales	Norway
--:-- UTC+1

== Coaching staff ==
=== Current coaching staff ===
Position	Name	Ref.
Head coach	(England) Gemma Grainger	
Assistant coach	(Norway) Ingvild Stensland (England) Lee Skyrme	
Goalkeeping coach	(Norway) Jon Knudsen	

== Players ==
=== Current squad ===
The following players were called up for the 2027 FIFA Women's World Cup qualification play-off matches against Romania on 9 and 13 October 2026.

Caps and goals correct as of 13 October 2026, after the match against Romania.

No.	Pos.	Player	Date of birth (age)	Caps	Goals	Club
1	GK	Cecilie Fiskerstrand	20 March 1996 (age 30)	75	0	(Italian Football Federation) Fiorentina
12	GK	Selma Panengstuen	5 March 2003 (age 23)	3	0	(The Football Association) Tottenham Hotspur
23	GK	Sunniva Skoglund	22 May 2002 (age 24)	2	0	(Norwegian Football Federation) SK Brann
2	DF	Marit Bratberg Lund	7 November 1997 (age 29)	27	1	(Portuguese Football Federation) Benfica
3	DF	Marthine Østenstad	18 March 2001 (age 25)	8	1	(German Football Association) Eintracht Frankfurt
4	DF	Julie Blakstad	27 August 2001 (age 25)	39	5	(The Football Association) Tottenham Hotspur
5	DF	Guro Bergsvand	3 March 1994 (age 32)	50	7	(Italian Football Federation) Fiorentina
6	DF	Emilie Woldvik	8 January 1999 (age 27)	19	0	(Italian Football Federation) Fiorentina
13	DF	Thea Bjelde	5 June 2000 (age 26)	40	2	(German Football Association) VfL Wolfsburg
16	DF	Mathilde Harviken	29 December 2001 (age 24)	46	1	(The Football Association) Aston Villa
7	MF	Ingrid Syrstad Engen	29 April 1998 (age 28)	100	6	(French Football Federation) Lyon
8	MF	Vilde Bøe Risa	13 July 1995 (age 31)	97	4	(United States Soccer Federation) North Carolina Courage
9	MF	Elisabeth Terland	28 June 2001 (age 25)	52	13	(The Football Association) Manchester United
11	MF	Guro Reiten	26 July 1994 (age 32)	114	22	(United States Soccer Federation) Gotham FC
15	MF	Justine Kielland	22 November 2002 (age 23)	16	0	(The Football Association) Aston Villa
17	MF	Emma Stølen Godø	31 May 2000 (age 26)	5	0	(Italian Football Federation) Juventus
18	MF	Frida Maanum	16 July 1999 (age 27)	104	24	(The Football Association) Arsenal
21	MF	Lisa Naalsund	11 June 1995 (age 31)	41	2	(The Football Association) Birmingham City
22	MF	Signe Gaupset	18 June 2005 (age 21)	22	8	(The Football Association) Tottenham Hotspur
14	FW	Ada Hegerberg (captain)	10 July 1995 (age 31)	101	55	(French Football Federation) Lyon
19	FW	Cathinka Tandberg	18 June 2004 (age 22)	9	0	(The Football Association) Tottenham Hotspur
20	FW	Synne Jensen	15 February 1996 (age 30)	38	7	(Royal Spanish Football Federation) Atlético Madrid

=== Recent call-ups ===
The following players have also been called up to the squad within the past 12 months.

Pos.	Player	Date of birth (age)	Caps	Goals	Club	Latest call-up
DF	Andrea Norheim	30 January 1999 (age 27)	0	0	(Germany) RB Leipzig	v. Austria, 9 June 2026
DF	Emilie Bragstad ^{TOP}	16 December 2001 (age 24)	0	0	(Sweden) Hammarby	v. Austria, 9 June 2026
DF	Tuva Hansen ^{INJ}	4 August 1997 (age 29)	62	2	(England) West Ham United	v. Germany, 5 June 2026
MF	Emilie Joramo	13 January 2002 (age 24)	3	0	(England) Brighton & Hove Albion	v. Slovenia, 18 April 2026
FW	Caroline Graham Hansen ^{INJ} (vice-captain)	18 February 1995 (age 31)	127	54	(Spain) Barcelona	v. Greece, 9 October 2026
FW	Iris Ómarsdóttir	12 July 2003 (age 23)	0	0	(Italy) Fiorentina	v. Austria, 9 June 2026
FW	Sara Kanutte Fornes ^{TOP}	1 December 2001 (age 24)	0	0	(Sweden) Malmö	v. Austria, 9 June 2026
FW	Anna Jøsendal ^{TOP}	29 April 2001 (age 25)	10	0	(England) Liverpool	v. Germany, 5 June 2026
FW	Karina Sævik	24 March 1996 (age 30)	68	9	(Norway) Vålerenga	v. Slovenia, 18 April 2026
FW	Celin Bizet Dønnum ^{WD}	24 October 2001 (age 25)	31	7	(England) Manchester United	v. Japan, 28 October 2025
FW	Sophie Román Haug ^{INJ}	4 June 1999 (age 27)	24	12	(England) Liverpool	v. Japan, 28 October 2025
Notes: ^{INJ} = Withdrew due to injury; ^{PRE} = Preliminary squad; ^{RET} = Retired from the national team; ^{SBY} = Standby player; ^{TOP} = Train-on player; ^{WD} = Player withdrew from the squad due to non-injury issue

== Records ==
As of 9 June 2026

Players in bold are still active with the national team.

=== Most appearances ===
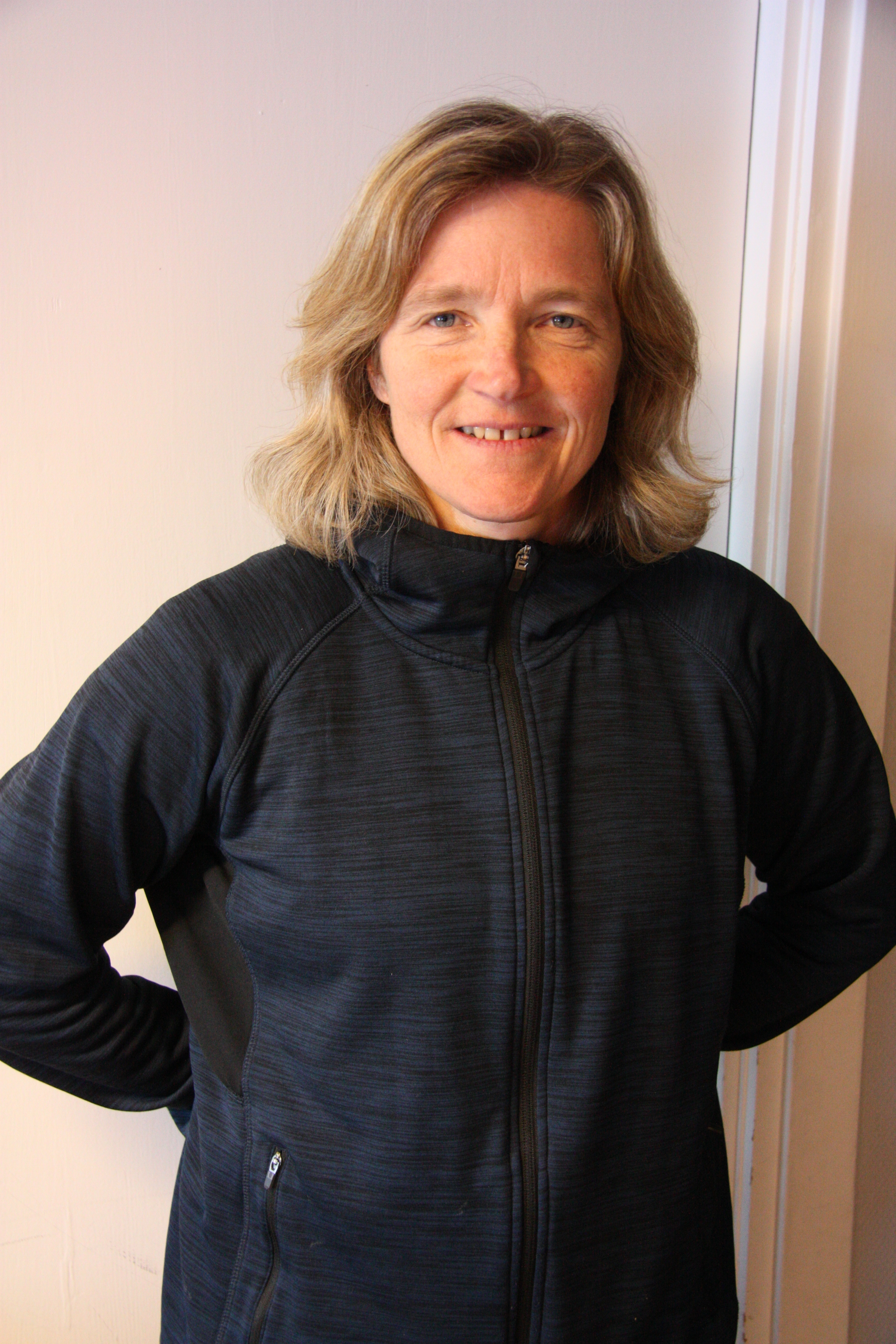
Hege Riise currently holds the record for the most appearances for the Norway women's national football team.

Rank	Player	Career	Caps	Goals
1	Hege Riise	1990–2004	188	58
2	Solveig Gulbrandsen	1998–2015	183	55
2	Maren Mjelde	2007–2025	183	20
4	Bente Nordby	1991–2007	172	0
5	Trine Rønning	1999–2016	162	22
6	Linda Medalen	1987–1999	152	64
7	Heidi Støre	1980–1997	151	22
8	Ingvild Stensland	2003–2016	144	10
9	Ingrid Hjelmseth	2003–2019	138	0
10	Unni Lehn	1996–2007	134	24

=== Top goalscorers ===
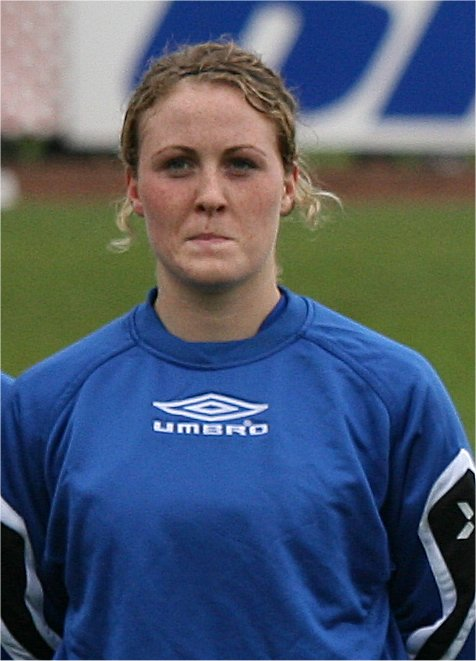
Isabell Herlovsen currently holds the record for the most goals scored for the Norway women's national football team.

#	Player	Career	Goals	Caps	Avg.
1	Isabell Herlovsen	2005–2019	67	133	0.50
2	Marianne Pettersen	1994–2003	66	98	0.67
3	Linda Medalen	1987–1999	64	152	0.42
4	Ann Kristin Aarønes	1990–1999	60	111	0.54
5	Hege Riise	1990–2004	58	188	0.31
6	**Ada Hegerberg**	2011–present	55	100	0.55
6	Solveig Gulbrandsen	1998–2015	55	183	0.30
8	**Caroline Graham Hansen**	2011–present	54	127	0.43
9	Dagny Mellgren	1999–2005	49	95	0.52
10	Ragnhild Gulbrandsen	1997–2007	30	80	0.38

== Competitive record ==
=== FIFA Women's World Cup ===
FIFA Women's World Cup record										Qualification record					
Year	Result	Position	Pld	W	D*	L	GF	GA	Squad	Pld	W	D*	L	GF	GA
(China) 1991	Runners-up	2nd	6	4	0	2	14	10	Squad	UEFA Women's Euro 1991					
(Sweden) 1995	Champions	1st	6	6	0	0	23	1	Squad	UEFA Women's Euro 1995					
(United States) 1999	Fourth place	4th	6	4	1	1	16	8	Squad	6	4	1	1	13	5
(United States) 2003	Quarter-finals	6th	4	2	0	2	10	6	Squad	6	5	1	0	21	3
(China) 2007	Fourth place	4th	6	3	1	2	12	11	Squad	8	7	1	0	22	3
(Germany) 2011	Group stage	9th	3	1	0	2	2	5	Squad	10	9	1	0	42	2
(Canada) 2015	Round of 16	10th	4	2	1	1	9	4	Squad	10	9	0	1	41	5
(France) 2019	Quarter-finals	8th	5	2	1	2	7	7	Squad	8	7	0	1	22	4
(Australia) (New Zealand) 2023	Round of 16	13th	4	1	1	2	7	4	Squad	10	9	1	0	47	2
(Brazil) 2027	Qualification in progress									8	6	0	2	19	9
(Costa Rica) (Jamaica) (Mexico) (United States) 2031	To be determined									To be determined					
(United Kingdom) 2035	To be determined									To be determined					
Total	1 title	9/9	44	25	5	14	100	56		66	56	5	5	227	33

*Draws include knockout matches decided on penalty kicks.

FIFA Women's World Cup history
Year	Round	Date	Opponent	Result	Stadium
(China) 1991	Group stage	16 November	China	L 0–4	Tianhe Stadium, Guangzhou
(China) 1991	Group stage	19 November	New Zealand	W 4–0	Guangdong Provincial Stadium, Guangzhou
(China) 1991	Group stage	21 November	Denmark	W 2–1	Ying Dong Stadium, Panyu
(China) 1991	Quarter-finals	24 November	Italy	W 3–2	Jiangmen Stadium, Jiangmen
(China) 1991	Semi-finals	27 November	Sweden	W 4–1	Ying Dong Stadium, Panyu
(China) 1991	Final	30 November	United States	L 1–2	Tianhe Stadium, Guangzhou
(Sweden) 1995	Group stage	6 June	Nigeria	W 8–0	Tingvallen, Karlstad
(Sweden) 1995	Group stage	8 June	England	W 2–0	Tingvallen, Karlstad
(Sweden) 1995	Group stage	10 June	Canada	W 7–0	Strömvallen, Gävle
(Sweden) 1995	Quarter-finals	13 June	Denmark	W 3–1	Tingvallen, Karlstad
(Sweden) 1995	Semi-finals	15 June	United States	W 1–0	Arosvallen, Västerås
(Sweden) 1995	Final	18 June	Germany	W 2–0	Råsunda Stadium, Solna
(United States) 1999	Group stage	20 June	Russia	W 2–1	Foxboro Stadium, Foxborough
(United States) 1999	Group stage	23 June	Canada	W 7–1	Jack Kent Cooke Stadium, Landover
(United States) 1999	Group stage	26 June	Japan	W 4–0	Soldier Field, Chicago
(United States) 1999	Quarter-finals	30 June	Sweden	W 3–1	Spartan Stadium, San Jose
(United States) 1999	Semi-finals	4 July	China	L 0–5	Foxboro Stadium, Foxborough
(United States) 1999	Third place play-off	10 July	Brazil	D 0–0 (4–5 pen)	Rose Bowl, Pasadena
(United States) 2003	Group stage	20 September	France	W 2–0	Lincoln Financial Field, Philadelphia
(United States) 2003	Group stage	24 September	Brazil	L 1–4	RFK Stadium, Washington, D.C.
(United States) 2003	Group stage	27 September	South Korea	W 7–1	Gillette Stadium, Foxborough
(United States) 2003	Quarter-finals	1 October	United States	L 0–1	Gillette Stadium, Foxborough
(China) 2007	Group stage	12 September	Canada	W 2–1	Yellow Dragon Sports Center, Hangzhou
(China) 2007	Group stage	15 September	Australia	D 1–1	Yellow Dragon Sports Center, Hangzhou
(China) 2007	Group stage	20 September	Ghana	W 7–2	Yellow Dragon Sports Center, Hangzhou
(China) 2007	Quarter-finals	23 September	China	W 1–0	Wuhan Stadium, Wuhan
(China) 2007	Semi-finals	26 September	Germany	L 0–3	Tianjin Olympic Centre Stadium, Tianjin
(China) 2007	Third place play-off	30 September	United States	L 1–4	Hongkou Stadium, Shanghai
(Germany) 2011	Group stage	29 June	Equatorial Guinea	W 1–0	Impuls Arena, Augsburg
(Germany) 2011	Group stage	3 July	Brazil	L 0–3	Volkswagen-Arena, Wolfsburg
(Germany) 2011	Group stage	6 July	Australia	L 1–2	BayArena, Leverkusen
(Canada) 2015	Group stage	7 June	Thailand	W 4–0	TD Place Stadium, Ottawa
(Canada) 2015	Group stage	11 June	Germany	D 1–1	TD Place Stadium, Ottawa
(Canada) 2015	Group stage	15 June	Ivory Coast	W 3–1	Moncton Stadium, Moncton
(Canada) 2015	Round of 16	22 June	England	L 1–2	TD Place Stadium, Ottawa
(France) 2019	Group stage	8 June	Nigeria	W 3–0	Stade Auguste-Delaune, Reims
(France) 2019	Group stage	12 June	France	L 1–2	Allianz Riviera, Nice
(France) 2019	Group stage	17 June	South Korea	W 2–1	Stade Auguste-Delaune, Reims
(France) 2019	Round of 16	22 June	Australia	D 1–1 (4–1 pen)	Allianz Riviera, Nice
(France) 2019	Quarter-finals	27 June	England	L 0–3	Stade Océane, Le Havre
(Australia) (New Zealand) 2023	Group stage	20 July	New Zealand	L 0–1	Eden Park, Auckland
(Australia) (New Zealand) 2023	Group stage	25 July	Switzerland	D 0–0	Forsyth Barr Stadium, Dunedin
(Australia) (New Zealand) 2023	Group stage	30 July	Philippines	W 6–0	Eden Park, Auckland
(Australia) (New Zealand) 2023	Round of 16	5 August	Japan	L 1–3	Wellington Regional Stadium, Wellington

=== Olympic Games ===
Summer Olympics record
Year	Result	Position	Pld	W	D*	L	GF	GA	Squad
(United States) 1996	Bronze medalists	3rd	5	3	1	1	12	6	Squad
(Australia) 2000	Gold medalists	1st	5	4	0	1	9	6	Squad
(Greece) 2004	Did not qualify								
(China) 2008	Quarter-finals	7th	4	2	0	2	5	7	Squad
(United Kingdom) 2012	Did not qualify								
(Brazil) 2016	Did not qualify								
(Japan) 2020	Did not qualify								
(France) 2024	Did not qualify								
(United States) 2028	To be determined								
(Australia) 2032	To be determined								
Total	1 Gold medal	3/8	14	9	1	4	26	19	

*Draws include knockout matches decided on penalty kicks.

=== UEFA Women's Championship ===
UEFA Women's Championship record										Qualifying record							
Year	Result	Position	Pld	W	D*	L	GF	GA	Squad	Pld	W	D*	L	GF	GA	P/R	Rnk
1984	Did not qualify									6	3	1	2	10	6	–	
(Norway) 1987	Champions	1st	2	2	0	0	4	1	Squad	6	3	3	0	12	6	–	
(West Germany) 1989	Runners-up	2nd	2	1	0	1	3	5	Squad	8	4	1	3	15	11	–	
(Denmark) 1991	Runners-up	2nd	2	0	1	1	1	3	Squad	8	7	1	0	16	1	–	
(Italy) 1993	Champions	1st	2	2	0	0	2	0	Squad	6	5	1	0	30	0	–	
(England) (Germany) (Norway) (Sweden) 1995	Semi-finals	3rd	2	1	0	1	5	7	Squad	8	7	1	0	40	6	–	
(Norway) 1997	Group stage	5th	3	1	1	1	5	2	Squad	6	5	1	0	33	1	–	
(Germany) 2001	Semi-finals	3rd	4	1	1	2	4	3	Squad	6	6	0	0	25	0	–	
(England) 2005	Runners-up	2nd	5	2	1	2	10	10	Squad	10	8	1	1	31	7	–	
(Finland) 2009	Semi-finals	3rd	5	2	1	2	6	9	Squad	8	7	1	0	26	0	–	
(Sweden) 2013	Runners-up	2nd	6	3	2	1	7	4	Squad	10	8	0	2	35	9	–	
(Netherlands) 2017	Group stage	16th	3	0	0	3	0	4	Squad	8	7	1	0	29	2	–	
(England) 2022	Group stage	10th	3	1	0	2	4	10	Squad	6	6	0	0	34	1	–	
(Switzerland) 2025	Quarter-finals	7th	4	3	0	1	9	7	Squad	10	5	4	1	28	4	(Note: From Euro 2025 onwards a new qualifying format was introduced, linked to the Women's Nations League where teams are divided into leagues with promotion/relegation between the leagues at the end of each cycle.)	10th
(Germany) 2029	To be determined									To be determined							
Total	2 titles	13/14	43	19	7	17	60	65		106	81	16	9	364	54	10th	

*Draws include knockout matches decided on penalty kicks.

=== UEFA Women's Nations League ===
UEFA Women's Nations League record
League phase												Finals							
Season	LG	Grp	Pos	Pld	W	D	L	GF	GA	P/R	RK	Year	Pos	Pld	W	D	L	GF	GA
2023–24	A	2	3rd	8	3	2	3	17	8	*	12th	(Europe) 2024	Did not qualify						
2025	A	2	2nd	6	2	2	2	4	5	Same position	8th	(Europe) 2025	Did not qualify						
Total				14	5	4	5	21	13	-		Total		-	-	-	-	-	-

▲	Promoted at end of season
Same position	No movement at end of season
▼	Relegated at end of season
*	Participated in promotion/relegation play-offs

=== Algarve Cup ===
The Algarve Cup is a global invitational tournament for national teams in women's soccer hosted by the Portuguese Football Federation (FPF). Held annually in the Algarve region of Portugal since 1994, it is one of the most prestigious women's football events, alongside the Women's World Cup and Women's Olympic Football.

Algarve Cup record
Year	Result
(Portugal) 1994	Champions
(Portugal) 1995	Third place
(Portugal) 1996	Champions
(Portugal) 1997	Champions
(Portugal) 1998	Champions
(Portugal) 1999	Third place
(Portugal) 2000	Runner-up
(Portugal) 2001	Fifth place
(Portugal) 2002	Runner-up
(Portugal) 2003	Third place
(Portugal) 2004	Runner-up
(Portugal) 2005	Fifth place
(Portugal) 2006	Fifth place
(Portugal) 2007	Fifth place
(Portugal) 2008	Third place
(Portugal) 2009	Ninth place
(Portugal) 2010	Sixth place
(Portugal) 2011	Fifth place
(Portugal) 2012	Seventh place
(Portugal) 2013	Third place
(Portugal) 2014	Tenth place
(Portugal) 2015	Fifth place
(Portugal) 2016	Did not enter
(Portugal) 2017	Eleventh place
(Portugal) 2018	Seventh place
(Portugal) 2019	Champions
(Portugal) 2020	Third place
(Portugal) 2022	Third place

== Honours ==
=== Major competitions ===
- FIFA Women's World Cup
  - Champions (1): 1995
  - Runners-up (1): 1991
- UEFA Women's Championship
  - Champions (2): 1987, 1993
  - Runners-up (4): 1989, 1991, 2005, 2013
- Summer Olympic Games
  - Gold Medal (1): 2000
  - Bronze Medal (1): 1996

=== Friendly ===
- FIFA Women's Invitation Tournament: Winner 1988
- Algarve Cup: Winner 1994, 1996, 1997, 1998, 2019
- Albena Cup: Winner 1988, 1989
- Four Nations Tournament: Winner 2002, 2013
- Cyprus Tournament: Winner 1993

== See also ==
- Sport in Norway
- Football in Norway
- Women's football in Norway
- List of Norway women's international footballers
- Norway women's national under-17 football team

== Notes ==
Sporting positions
Preceded by 1991 United States	World Champions; 1995 (first title)	Succeeded by 1999 United States
Preceded by 1996 United States	Olympic Champions; 2000 (first title)	Succeeded by 2004 United States
Preceded by 1984 Sweden	European Champions; 1987 (first title)	Succeeded by 1989 West Germany
Preceded by 1991 Germany	European Champions; 1993 (second title)	Succeeded by 1995 Germany
