= Carlo Ferreri =

Italian actor & director (born 1973)

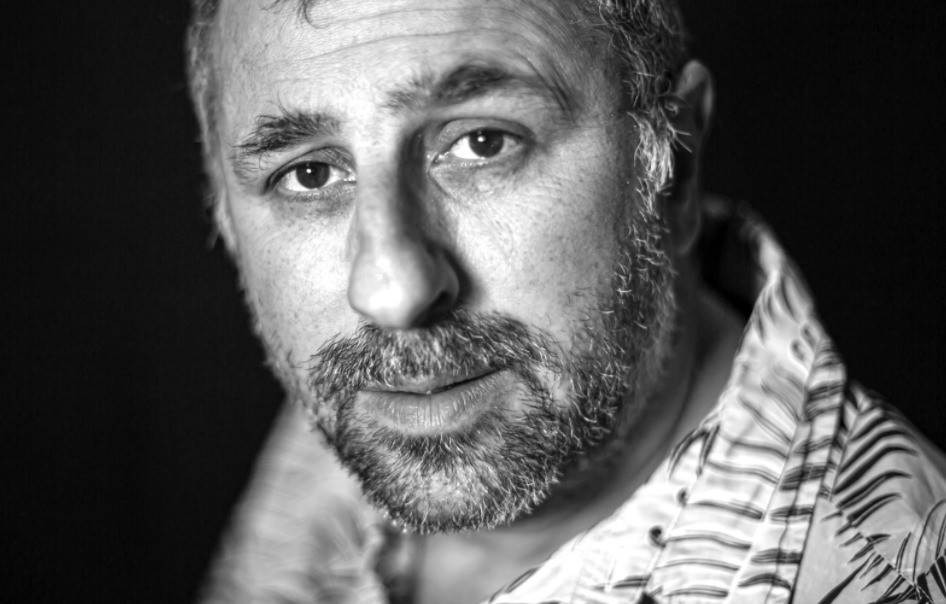
- Carlo Ferreri in 2024
- Born: March 3, 1973 (age 53); Catania, Italy
- Occupations: Actor, director

Carlo Ferreri is an Italian actor and director.

== Biography ==
Ferreri works as an actor in theatre and television. He is known for comic roles in cinema, such as in the feature film Mauro c'ha da fare, in which he plays the protagonist Mauro, directed by Alessandro Di Robilant.

He also appeared as the comic character Nando in the 2025 box-office hit Io sono la fine del mondo, starring Angelo Duro and directed by Gennaro Nunziante.

On television, in 2004 he took part in the miniseries Paolo Borsellino for Taodue, playing the role of Antonio Vullo, the only surviving member of the escort, and in 2007 he played mafia member Gaspare Mutolo in the series Il capo dei capi alongside Claudio Gioè.

He received awards for his leading role in the medium-length film Motore! by Alessandro Marinaro (winner of La 25a Ora on LA7 and best actor at the Quadra FilmFest).

Ferreri trained in theatre by attending international commedia dell'arte courses directed by Antonio Fava, a dramaturgical writing and personal life course directed by Enzo Moscato, and by studying with other masters such as Gianni Salvo, Marise Flach, Lamberto Puggelli, and Renzo Musumeci Greco. He also studied the technique of cunto siciliano using the work of storyteller Salvatore Ferreri and ethnologist Giuseppe Pitrè.

On stage, he has worked with major companies such as the Teatro Stabile di Trieste, the Teatro Stabile di Catania, and the Associated Artists of Gorizia. He has also directed several successful theatre productions such as Morir di fama with Evelyn Famà, and Il caso di Alessandro e Maria by Giorgio Gaber and Sandro Luporini.

Since the 2000s, he has collaborated with important film and theatre directors such as Marco Tullio Giordana, Gianluca Maria Tavarelli, Gennaro Nunziante, Antonio Calenda, Armando Pugliese, Alessandro Di Robilant, Alberto Negrin, Nzinga Stewart, Luca Ribuoli, Enzo Monteleone, and Gianluigi Calderone.

He has appeared in national commercials such as those for the Calcio Catania and Galbanino Galbani cheese. In 2026 he starred in the Eni Cortina commercial directed by Martin Werner.

== Filmography ==
=== Cinema ===
- One Hundred Steps (I cento passi, 2000), directed by Marco Tullio Giordana
- Letters from Sicily (Lettere dalla Sicilia, 2005), directed by Manuel Giliberti
- Action! ("Motore!", 2008), directed by Alessandro Marinaro
- One Million Days ("Un milione di giorni", 2011), directed by Emanuele Giliberti
- Mauro Has Things to Do ("Mauro c'ha da fare", 2015), directed by Alessandro Di Robilant
- The Traitor (Il traditore, 2019), directed by Marco Bellocchio
- A Breath of Fresh Air (Una boccata d'aria, 2022), directed by Alessio Lauria
- Conversazioni con altre donne ("Conversations with Other Women", 2023), directed by Filippo Conz
- I Am the End of the World (Io sono la fine del mondo , 2025), directed by Gennaro Nunziante

=== Television ===
- A Single Weak Voice ("Una sola debole voce", 2001), miniseries directed by Gianluigi Calderone
- Paolo Borsellino (2004), miniseries directed by Gianluca Tavarelli
- Il capo dei capi ("The Boss of Bosses", 2007), miniseries directed by Enzo Monteleone
- Paolo Borsellino - I 57 giorni ("The 57 Days", 2012), directed by Alberto Negrin
- The Young Montalbano, episode "The First Investigation of Montalbano" (2012), directed by Gianluca Tavarelli
- Sicily - Angels, Mafia and Palaces (Sizilien - Engel, Mafia Und Palazzi, 2015), TV film directed by Carmen Butta
- Mafia Only Kills in Summer (La mafia uccide solo d'estate, 2016), TV series, 4 episodes, directed by Luca Ribuoli
- A Summer in Sicily (Ein Sommer auf Sizilien, 2016), German TV film directed by Michael Keusch
- A Doctor in the Family (Un Medico in famiglia - Si, a volte ritornano, 2016), TV series, stag 2 ep.10, directed by Elisabetta Marchetti
- A Doctor in the Family (Un Medico in famiglia - Lele, ti presento Valerio, 2016), TV series, stag 2 ep.7, directed by Elisabetta Marchetti
- The Horseman’s Move - Once Upon a Time in Vigata (La mossa del cavallo - C'era una volta Vigata, 2018), TV film directed by Gianluca Tavarelli
- Lives on the Run ("Vite in fuga", 2020), TV series directed by Luca Ribuoli
- From Scratch (From Scratch - La forza di un amore, 2022), TV series, episode 1
- Troublemaker ("Malatesta", 2026), Book Trailer, directed by Alessandro Marinaro
- Ready for the snow? (Pronti per la neve? - Eni Cortina, 2026), Spot, episode 1 directed by Martin Werner
- Under the same emotion (Sotto la stessa emozione? - Eni Cortina, 2026), Spot, episode 2 directed by Martin Werner
- Eni Cortina - 2026 Winter Olympics - Extended Version - directed by Martin Werner (2025)

== Theatre ==
=== As director ===
- Spettacolo semiserio in forma di duo ("Semi-Serious Show in the Form of a Duo", 1995)
- Wo-Man (2000)
- Ragusa 9 Aprile 1921 - cronaca in forma di cunto ("Ragusa 9 April 1921 - Chronicle in the Form of Cunto", 2004)
- Lunerie ("Mooneries", 2004)
- Morir di fama ("To Die of Fame", 2008)
- Libero Amleto ("Free Hamlet", 2014)
- Bemporad (2015)
- L'uomo, la bestia e la virtù ("The Man, the Beast and the Virtue", 2020)
- L'eternità dolcissima di Renato Cane ("The Sweetest Eternity of Renato Cane", 2023)
- Il caso di Alessandro e Maria ("The Case of Alessandro and Maria", 2024)
- Il Matrimonio perfetto ("The Perfet Wedding", 2026)

=== As actor ===
- Il ballo dei manichini ("The Mannequins' Ball", 1991), by Bruno Jasienski
- Il giubbotto ("The Jacket", 1992), by Stranislav Stratiev
- Il suicida ("The Suicide", 1993), by Nikolaj Ėrdman, directed by Gianni Salvo
- Don Chisciotte e il carro dei comici ("Don Quixote and the Comedians’ Cart", 1995), by Miguel de Cervantes
- Favole al rovescio ("Upside-Down Fables", 1995), by Gianni Rodari, directed by Franco Giorgio
- Evviva la rivoluzione ("Long Live the Revolution", 1994), by Augusto Boal
- Regina in berlina ("Queen in Berline", 1996), by Sergio Tofano, directed by Gianni Salvo
- Gran varietà futurista ("Great Futurist Variety Show", 1996), by Filippo Tommaso Marinetti
- Non si dorme a Kirkwall ("No Sleeping in Kirkwall", 1996), by Alberto Perrini
- Giovannino perdigiorno ("Johnny Never-do-a-thing", 1996), by Gianni Rodari, directed by Franco Giorgio
- Il treno ha fischiato ("The Train Whistled", 1997), by Luigi Pirandello
- Mimi Siciliani ("Sicilian Mimes", 1997), by Francesco Lanza
- Gli affari del signor Gatto ("Mr. Cat’s Business", 1997), by Gianni Rodari, directed by Franco Giorgio
- Tingeltangel (1998), by Karl Valentin
- I 7 peccati capitali ("The Seven Deadly Sins", 1998), by Bertolt Brecht
- L'Histoire du soldat ("The Soldier's Tale", 1998), by Igor Stravinsky
- Il naso ("The Nose", 1996), by Nikolaj Gogol, directed by Gianni Salvo
- Augusto Augusto ("Augustus Augustus", 1994), by Pavel Kohout, directed by Gianni Salvo
- A Midsummer Night’s Dream (Sogno di una notte di mezza estate, 2000), by William Shakespeare, directed by Franco Però
- Giufà e Gesù ("Giufà and Jesus", 2001), by Giuseppe Bonaviri
- Conversazione in Sicilia ("Conversation in Sicily", 2003), by Elio Vittorini
- Carmen (2003), by Antonio Aniante
- Plumes danza su piano ostinato ("Plumes Dance on a Stubborn Piano", 2002), directed by Giovanna Amarù
- In corpore muto ("In Silent Body", 2002), from Antonin Artaud, directed by Audrey Borthayre and Giovanna Amarù
- Romeo and Juliet (Romeo e Giulietta, 2002), by William Shakespeare, directed by Lamberto Puggelli
- Recital Quasimodo (2002), directed by Lamberto Puggelli and Umberto Ceriani
- Dramma sacro ("Sacred Drama", 1995/2005), by Alfonso Ricca, directed by Gianni Battaglia
- Fata fiore ("Fairy Flower", 2005), by Luigi Capuana, directed by Angelo Tosto
- The Stranger (Lo straniero, 2006), by Albert Camus, adapted by Marco Baliani, directed by Gianni Salvo
- Opera Comique (2007), directed by Antonio Calenda
- The Regeneration (La rigenerazione, 2008), by Italo Svevo, directed by Antonio Calenda
- To be or not to be (2008), directed by Antonio Calenda
- Turandot (2009), by Carlo Gozzi, directed by Manuel Giliberti
- Il matrimonio ("The Marriage", 2010), by Nikolaj Gogol, directed by Nino Mangano
- Cappiddazzo paga tuttu ("Cappiddazzo Pays for Everything", 2010), by Luigi Pirandello and Nino Martoglio, directed by Pippo Pattavina
- L'aria del continente ("The Air of the Continent", 2010), by Nino Martoglio, directed by Pippo Pattavina
- Chantecler (2008), from Edmond Rostand, translated by Enzo Moscato, directed by Armando Pugliese
- La Confessione ("The Confession", 2011), directed by Walter Manfrè
- Totò e Vicè (2012), by Franco Scaldati, directed by Gianni Salvo
- Il ratto delle sabine ("The Rape of the Sabine Women", 2014), directed by Pippo Pattavina
- Non si sa come ("It Is Not Known How", 2014), by Luigi Pirandello
- La Centona (2014), by Nino Martoglio, directed by Gianni Scuto
- Pipino il Breve ("Pepin the Short", 2015), by Tony Cucchiara
- Matrimoni ed altri effetti collaterali ("Marriages and Other Side Effects", 2017), by Ivan Campillo, directed by Manuel Giliberti
- La signora Morli ("Mrs. Morli", 2019), by Luigi Pirandello
- Alchimia di parole: dai lirici greci a Leopardi ("Alchemy of Words: from Greek Lyric Poets to Leopardi", 2025), directed by Massimo Leggio
