= Evelyn Famà =

Italian actress and dancer (born 1980)

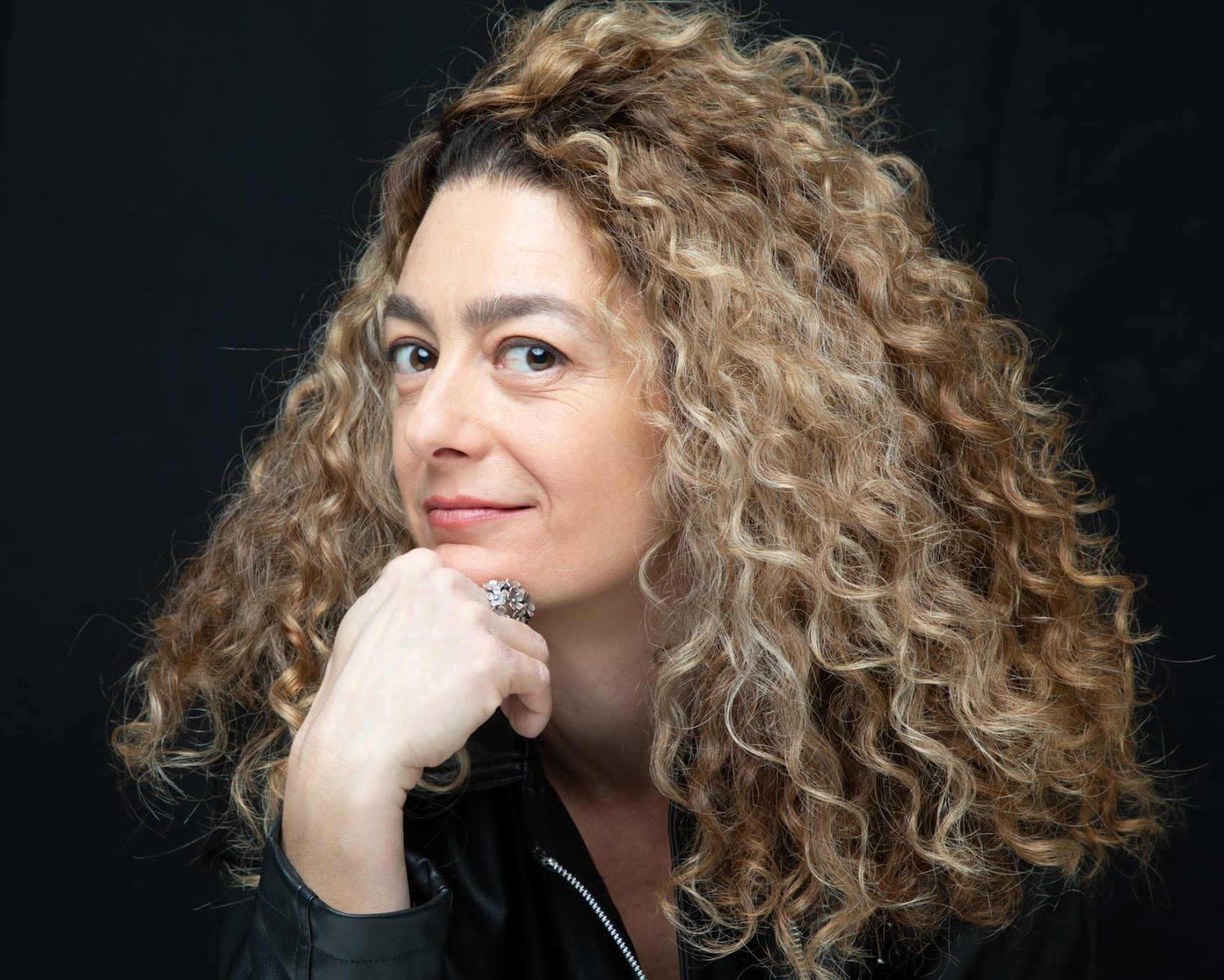
- Famà in 2024
- Born: 14 June 1980 (age 46); Catania
- Occupations: actress, dancer

Evelyn Famà (Catania, 14 June 1980) is an Italian actress and dancer.

== Early life ==
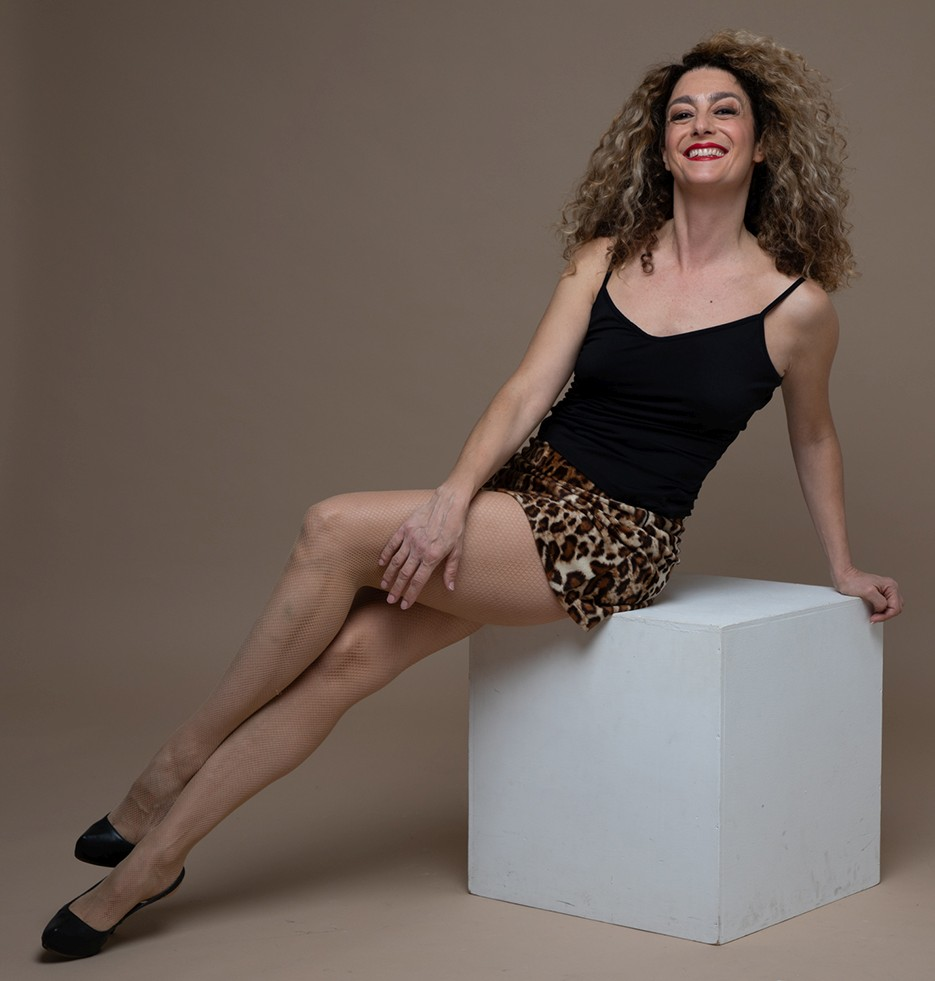
Evelyn Famà in 2023

Evelyn Famà was born in Catania, where she began studying classical, modern, and contemporary dance at the age of five. She later enrolled in the Accademia di belle arti di Catania in the set design department. Her career began as a dancer under the direction of choreographer Silvana Lo Giudice, performing classical ballets such as Giselle, Paquita, and Don Quixote, as well as contemporary dance-theatre adaptations of works by Giovanni Verga, Luigi Pirandello and García Lorca. At eighteen, she was selected to join the Umberto Spadaro Academy of Dramatic Arts of the Teatro Stabile di Catania.

== Acting career ==
After graduating from the Academy, she began working continuously in theatre, film, and television, collaborating with major private national productions and prominent repertory theatres. Her first national tour was Lysistrata by Aristophanes, produced by her city's repertory theatre and the Politecnico of Rome. The day after the tour ended, she earned her degree in Set Design, with a thesis on Pina Baush. In 2001, she won Best Actress at the international Salvo Randone award in Syracuse, standing out among actors and actresses who had graduated from Italy's top theatre academies. Her acting résumé includes renowned directors such as Ronconi, Puggelli, Mirabella, Siani, Di Robilant, Nekrosius, and Coucier.

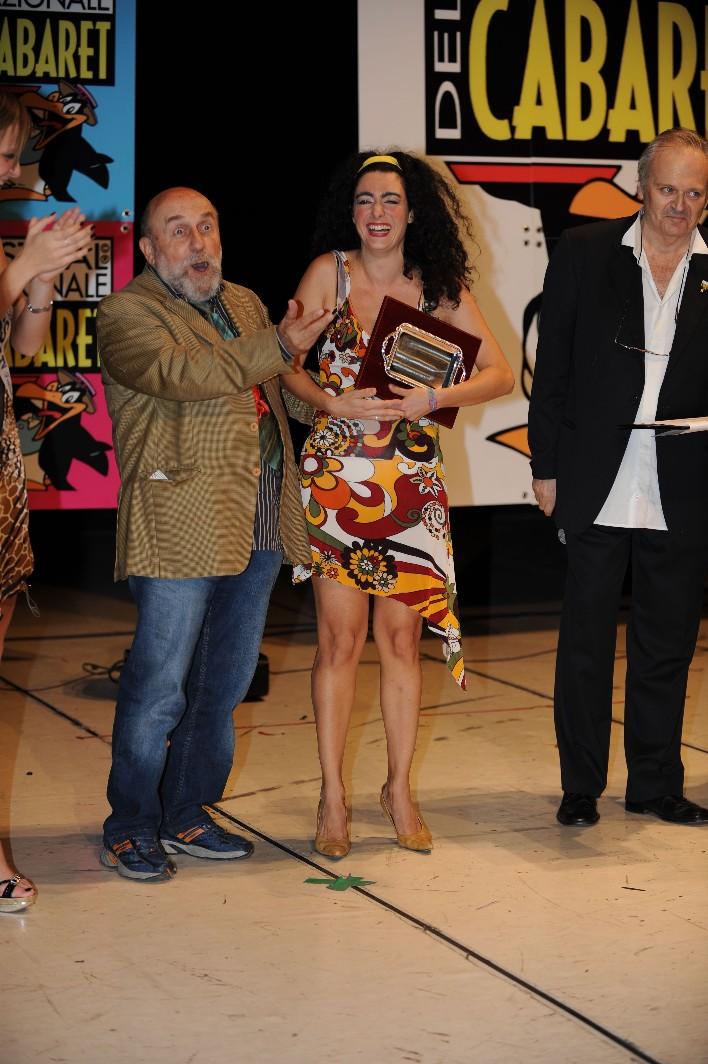
Evelyn Famà awarded by Enrico Beruschi at the National Cabaret Festival in Turin

Among her major theatre tours, she played Hecuba as Polyxena alongside Paola Gassman, and The Trojan Women as Cassandra. Other leading roles on stage include Alda in Tra vestiti che ballano by Rosso di San Secondo, the famous Mirra by Vittorio Alfieri, and the Virtuous Mrs. Perella in The Man, the Beast and the Virtue. In 2004, she won the Hystrio Award for Vocational Promise in Milan.

On television, she played Palmira Frisone in the Rai drama Il Figlio della Luna. On the big screen, she starred in a comic duo with Nino Frassica in the film Un milione di giorni by Emanuele Giliberti. She also starred in the docufiction La Voce del corpo and in Mauro c'ha da fare by Alessandro Di Robilant, alongside Carlo Ferreri.

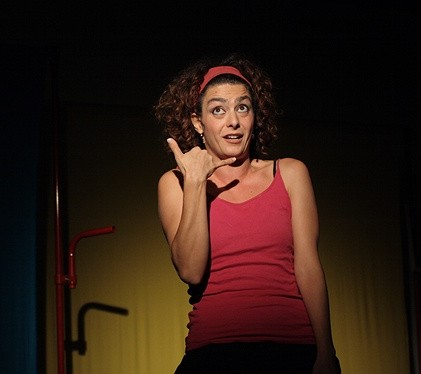
Evelyn Famà in Morir di Fama

In 2020, she appeared in The Shameful Story (La storia vergognosa), a documentary film nominated for the 2021 Silver Ribbon Awards, produced by Istituto Luce and broadcast on Rai Storia Watch on RaiPlay. Directed by Nella Condorelli, Famà performs a powerful monologue in the final scene as Provvidenza Rumore, a courageous witness from the Monti Sicani region in 1911, testifying at the trial for the murder of Lorenzo Panepinto. Since 2007, she has been performing the comic monologue Morir di fama, directed by Carlo Ferreri, portraying a stressed yet ambitious actress obsessed with fame and appearances in a surreal setting. The show has also been staged at the Teatro Cafè Sconcerto in Venice, in collaboration with Zelig. She received several awards for excerpts from this one-woman show, including a special mention at the Premio Calandra and the Premio Rubens.

In October 2009, at the Teatro Nuovo in Turin, she won the XVIII National Cabaret Festival with a unique futurist-style performance focused on gesture, expression, and vocal technique. She also received the Ernst Thole Award for Most Original Interpretation.

In 2019, she voiced Giuseppina in Tufo, an animated documentary inspired by the story of Ignazio Cutrò, a construction entrepreneur who was a victim of mafia racketeering in the province of Agrigento.

Since 2015, together with Tuccio Musumeci he has played Falista in Pipino il Breve by Tony Cucchiara, receiving flattering reviews for "the use of the body and facial expressiveness absolutely out of the ordinary".

In 2025 she starred for Gennaro Nunziante and Angelo Duro in the film I Am the End of the World, in the role of Anna.

She was the testimonial of the commercials for Girella Motta, for the Calcio Catania season ticket campaign in 2008, and for Lidl in 2013 the latter directed by Luca Lucini.

== Filmography ==
=== Film ===
Year	Title	Role	Director	Notes
2011	La voce del corpo		Luca Vullo	
2011	Un milione di giorni		Emanuele Giliberti	
2012	Mauro c'ha da fare		Alessandro Di Robilant	
2017	La storia vergognosa		Nella Condorelli	Documentary
2020	Cyrano		Joe Wright	
2024	Succede anche nelle migliori famiglie		Alessandro Siani	
2025	Io sono la fine del mondo	Anna	Gennaro Nunziante	
2025	Vanni il Siciliano		Nella Condorelli	Documentary

=== Short films ===
Year	Title	Role	Director	Notes	Awards and nominations
2004	Italian Comics		Alessandro Marinaro	Short film	
2005	Campioni del Mondo		Alessandro Marinaro	Short film	
2008	Motore!		Alessandro Marinaro	Short film	
2008	Il dito sull'orologio		Francesco Lo Bianco	Short film	
2009	Italian Comics II – Veline		Alessandro Marinaro	Short film	
2019	Tufo	Giuseppina (voice)	Victoria Musci	Animated short	
2021	Free		Aashish Gadhvi	Short film	
2022	Piece of Art		Rubens Peeters	Short film	
2022	Look at me		Gina Simone	Short film	
2023	Come il sale nell'acqua		Fabio Manfrè	Short film	
2023	Luma		Rachel Albert	Short film	Best Experimental Film Rhode Island Film Festival

=== Television ===
Year	Title	Role	Director	Notes
2006	Il figlio della luna	Palmira Frisone	Gianfranco Albano	Rai Fiction
2007	Phone Center Brambilla		Maurizio Monti	Jimmy Channel
2011	Bambine cattive		Simona Lianza	Comedy Central (Sky)
2017	Metropolitaun		Clemente Panebianco	Ultima TV
2025	The Twisted tale of Amanda knox	Lucrezia Ippolito	Michael Uppendhal Natalia Leite	Disney + Hulu

=== Advertising ===
Year	Title	Role	Director	Notes
2008	Calcio Catania		Alessandro Marinaro	Subscription campaign
2013	Lidl – Arance		Luca Lucini	TV commercial
2017	Sharing bag		Maurizio Cannata	Web spot
2017	Gira meglio con Girella		Maurizio Cannata	Web spot
2024	Teatro Stabile di Catania		Antonio Parrinello	Institutional promo
2025	Malatesta		Alessandro Marinaro	Booktrailer

== Theatre ==
=== Actress ===
Year	Title	Author	Director	Role
1996 e dal 2015 al 2025	Pipino il Breve	Tony Cucchiara	Giuseppe Di Martino	Falista
1998	La fanciulla che campava di vento	Tony Cucchiara	Armando Pugliese	
1998	I Malavoglia	Giovanni Verga	Giovanni Anfuso	Lia Malavoglia
1999	Lisistrata	Aristophanes	Mario Prosperi	
2000	La Penna di Hu	E. Donato	Ezio Donato	
2000	L'Inganni d'amore	Musumeci Catalano	Antonio Venturino	Flora
2002	Le rane	Aristophanes	Luca Ronconi	
2002	Prometeo	Aeschylus	Luca Ronconi	
2002	Baccanti	Euripide	Luca Ronconi	
2002	Ivanov	Anton Pavlovich Cechov	Eimuntas Nekrosius	
2002	Sogno di una notte di mezza estate	William Shakespeare	Franco Però	Ermia
2002	Tra Vestiti che ballano	Pier Maria Rosso di San Secondo	Romano Bernardi	Alda
2002	L'Uomo, la bestia e la virtù	Luigi Pirandello	Alvaro piccardi	Rosaria (I act), Grazia (II act)
2003	La Barca dei comici	da Carlo Goldoni	Franco Però	Mariuccia, Rosaura
2003	Vita miserie e dissolutezze di Micio Tempio Poeta	Filippo Arriva	Romano Bernardi	Nina
2004	Ecuba	Euripides	Giovanni Anfuso	Polissena
2005	Una Terra di nuvole e fiori	da Gesualdo Bufalino	Marco Baliani	Noemi da "La Panchina"
2005	La lunga vita di Marianna Ucrìa	Dacia Maraini	Lamberto Puggelli	
2006	Antonio e Cleopatra	William Shakespeare	Lamberto Puggelli	Clown
2007	Morir di Fama	Evelyn Famà	Carlo Ferreri	
2008	Una Festa Barocca	Vari Siciliani	Roberto Laganà Manoli	Colapesce
2008	Chantecler	Edmond Rostand	Armando Pugliese	
2009	Turandot	Carlo Gozzi	Emanuele Giliberti	Adelma
2010	Season's Greetings	Alan Ayckbourn	Giovanni Lombardo Radice	Jane Hopcroft
2011	Mirra	Vittorio Alfieri	Tatiana Alescio	Mirra
2013	Il Contravveleno	Nino Martoglio	Turi Giordano	Tina
2013	Questa terra ancora canta		Vincenzo Spampinato	Narratrice, Danzatrice
2013	Die Fledermaus	Johann Strauss	Michele Mirabella	Ida
2014	Il Medico dei pazzi	Eduardo Scarpetta	Armando Pugliese	Rosina
2014	Coefore	Eschilo	Daniele Salvo	Coro
2015	Crisi di madri	Marcial Coucier	Romano Bernardi	Sylvie
2015	Il Ratto delle Sabine	Von Schontan	Pippo Pattavina	Marianna
2016	Il Circo magico	Gianni Clementi	Gianni Salvo	
2016	Annata Ricca massaru cuntentu	Nino Martoglio	Giuseppe Romani	Gna Santa
2017	Così è (se vi pare)	Luigi Pirandello	Gianni Salvo	Signora Ponza
2017	Ma non è una cosa seria	Luigi Pirandello	Romano Bernardi	Loletta Festa
2017	Il Cavaliere Pedagna	Luigi Capuana	Giuseppe Romani	Elsa Moro
2017	Tutto per bene	Luigi Pirandello	Turi Giordano	Palma
2018	Miles Gloriosus	Giuseppe Fava da Plauto	Romano Bernardi	
2018	In cima al Campanile	Achille Campanile	Emanuele Giliberti	
2022	L'uomo, la bestia e la virtù	Luigi Pirandello	Carlo Ferreri	La Signora Perella
2022	Caccia al Lupo	Giovanni Verga	Ezio Donato	Mariangela
2023	Histoire du soldat	Igor Strawinkij	Ezio Donato	
2024	Peer Gynt	Henrik Ibsen	Alessandro Idonea	Woman in Green
2024	Una Finestra sul mondo	autori vari	Massimo Leggio	Guest Star
2026	R.U.R. Rossum's Universal Robots	Karel Capek	Cinzia Maccagnano	Helena Glory
2026	The School for Wives	Moliere	Luca Verdone	Agnès

=== Dancer ===
Year	Title	Music / Source	Choreographer / Director
1994	For Frank	Frank Sinatra	Silvana Lo Giudice
1996	Nel Regno di Mago Alfabeto		Silvana Lo Giudice
1996	Paquita	Ludwig Minkus	Silvana Lo Giudice
1997	La lupa	René Aubry, from Giovanni Verga	Silvana Lo Giudice
1997	Nozze di sangue	Federico García Lorca	Silvana Lo Giudice
1998	Orient Express	René Aubry	Cinzia Cona
1998	Danza e Parole		Orazio Torrisi
1998	Gengè	Luigi Pirandello	Cinzia Cona
1999	Per i sentieri di Trezza	from I Malavoglia by Verga	Donatella Capraro
2000	Il principe Dracula		Aldo Lo Castro

== Awards ==
- Premio Internazionale Salvo Randone (Siracusa)
  - 2001 - Best Actedss
- Premio Hystrio (Milano)
  - 2004 - To the vocation
- Premio Ernst Thole al XVIII FNDC (Torino)
  - 2009 - Most original interpretation
- XVIII Festival Nazionale del Cabaret (Torino)
  - 2009 - Best interpreter
