= Maurizio Mian =

Italian entrepreneur (born 1956)

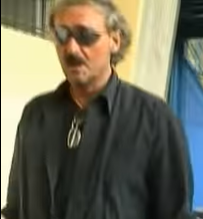
- Born: 25 March 1956 (age 70); Pisa, Italy

Maurizio Mian (born 25 March 1956) is an Italian entrepreneur, pharmaceutical heir and CEO of The Gunther Corporation. Mian has often used his dog Gunther as a figurehead for his investments in sports clubs, property and media. For publicity purposes Mian promulgated a long running urban legend of his dynasty of German Shepherd dogs, all called Gunther. The Gunther dogs frequently appear on published lists of the world's wealthiest animals.

== Sports investment ==
In June 1993, La Stampa reported that the CentroMatic Prato (it) professional Italian Volleyball League club had been purchased by Gunther IV. However the club sold all its players and went bankrupt after finishing the next season in last place.

On 8 March 1995, (International Women's Day) Gunther IV became honorary president of ACF Agliana, a leading Serie A (women's football) club. It was reported that his foundation had bought the club after carefully researching other opportunities. Agliana won the 1994–95 league title by five points from rivals Torres.

Gunther IV sensationally resigned as Agliana president in June 1995, after his handlers took exception to team captain Carolina Morace kissing controversialist politician Vittorio Sgarbi during a segment of the Il processo di Biscardi television programme. The decision drew a withering response from Morace. The Agliana management swiftly broke off their connection with the Gunther Group, remarking: "these people have only one interest, that of advertising themselves".

Before the 1995–96 season, the Gunther Group instead sponsored Agliana's rivals Verona CF. The club became known as "Verona Gunther" and undertook an extensive recruitment drive, which included Italy women's national football team players Stefania Antonini, Manuela Tesse, Raffaella Salmaso, Adele Marsiletti and Florinda Ciardi. Surprisingly Carolina Morace also agreed to join the team.

Verona won the league and Sue Lopez characterised the ownership situation as: "Verona Gunther, who won the Italian Women's Championship in 1996, are sponsored by a group of pharmaceutical companies. For publicity purposes they appointed a dog, a German Shepherd called Gunther IV, as 'president' of the club and he attends all matches as the 'club's benefactor'." A report in Die Tageszeitung was less charitable: "A fraudulent German shepherd haunts Italy's women's football and cannot get away from national player Morace".

Despite reported interest in acquiring Genoa C.F.C. in November 2000, the move ultimately did not take place.

In May 2002 the "Gunther Reform Trust" became the owner of Pisa Calcio, duly installing Gunther IV as honorary president. In the 2002–03 Serie C1 season, Pisa reached the play-off final but were defeated in extra-time by U.C. AlbinoLeffe. Rival U.S. Livorno 1915 ultras unfurled a banner bearing the legend: "Poisoned meatballs for Gunther". After two further seasons ended in mid-table finishes, Mian sold Pisa in 2005.

In March 2006 The Gunther Corporation briefly held a controlling interest in Serie D club U.S. Città di Pontedera. Pornographic film actor Ilona Staller ("Cicciolina") was installed as the club "godmother", while another pornographic actress Valentine Demy served as one of three club Presidents, alongside a Polish lap dancer named Karolcia and a British rapper named Prodigal1. The performance was related to Mian's left-libertarian views on reproductive rights and his upcoming appearance in the 2006 Italian general election.

Mian took a 12.5% stake in Carrarese Calcio in August 2010, alongside fellow investors Gianluigi Buffon and Cristiano Lucarelli. Despite Mian's stated loss of interest in football, his Gunther Group continued to be courted for investment in other clubs, including a return to Pisa in 2016 and the latest reincarnation of Parma in 2015. He partnered with Vitaly Kutuzov to take over FC Krumkachy Minsk in March 2021. In June 2021 he made an abortive attempt to buy U.S. Salernitana 1919.

== "Gunther" hoax ==
According to the fictional account, a wealthy German countess, Karlotta Liebenstein, willed her 152m DM fortune to her German Shepherd Gunther III upon her death in 1992. When Gunther III died the fortune passed to his son Gunther IV. The money was placed in trust controlled by Mian's family, on condition it could only be used to invest in sports teams. Liebenstein's son, also Gunther, had been a youth player for SV Werder Bremen and she was well disposed towards the Mians, whose pharmacology expertise had helped to treat her osteoporosis (or, in some versions of the story, the son's and/or dog's osteoporosis).

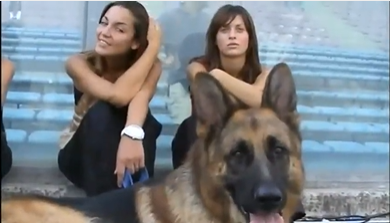
Gunther (VI?) during an appearance at Arena Garibaldi, Pisa, with two dancers

An Associated Press (AP) editorial in November 2021 described "a long-running tale used as a publicity stunt to dupe reporters". They apologised for their own history of straight reporting on the subject. At various different times Mian has denied the story, or denied his denials. In August 2007 an article in The Independent speculated that Gunther's back-story may have been conceived as a piece of performance art.

A Netflix documentary series was released in 2023 detailing the story of the Gunther line with Maurizio Mian admitting much of the story about the dog was made up for tax purposes.

== Other activities ==
In 1990 Gunther Group released a house music record entitled "Wild Dog" on Casablanca Records, which made extensive use of sampled dog barking.

The group's listing for sale of a property in Miami, formerly owned by Madonna, for $31 million in November 2021 was accompanied by more media coverage describing Gunther VI as the world's richest dog. They had purchased the property from Madonna in 2000 for $7.5 million.

In the 2006 Italian general election Mian stood as an unsuccessful candidate for the Rose in the Fist alliance: "I dream of a truly secular country with more science and less church." A pledge to make the RU-486 abortion pill legal in Italy was included in his manifesto.

The 2008 Liechtenstein tax affair revealed Mian had €400 million in the tax haven. He insisted that the funds, representing Gunther's legacy, had been properly declared to the Italian tax authorities.

In June 2009 "Gunther Reform Holding" invested €3 million to acquire a 20% stake in L'Unità , then under the ownership of Renato Soru. The newspaper went bankrupt in 2014, amid recriminations. Mian was unhappy that undertakings to provide the Gunther group with publicity had allegedly not been honoured.

Mian's mother Maria Gabriella Gentili died in June 2011, aged 82.

Mian collaborated with Fabrizio Corona on creating a reality television show, I Magnifici Cinque (English: The Magnificent Five) In 2017 Corona stated in court (on an unrelated matter) that Mian had paid him €1.7 million to promote the "crazy" project.
