= Indiana Production =

Italian multimedia company

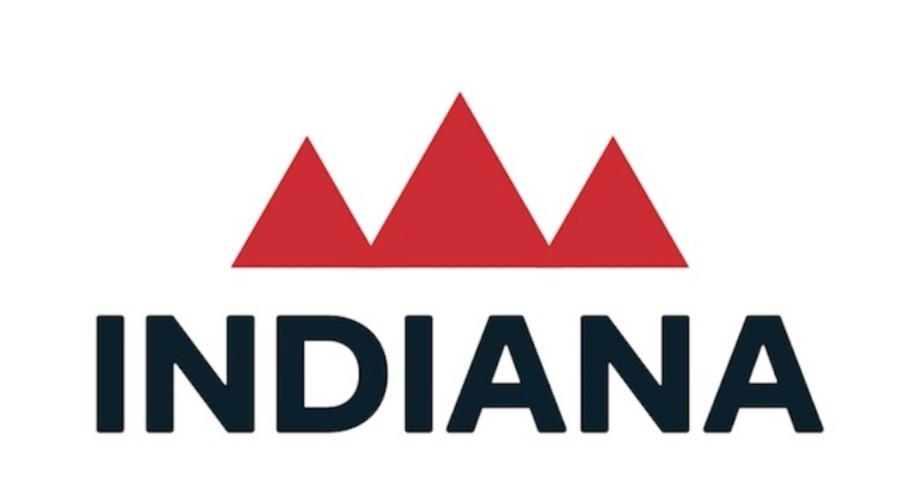
- Type: srl
- Industry: advertising and film production
- Founded: 2005 in Milan, Italy
- Founders: Fabrizio Donvito and Marco Cohen
- Headquarters: via Argelati 33, Milan, Italy
- Key people: Fabrizio Donvito, Marco Cohen, Benedetto Habib and Karim Bartoletti
- Products: cinema, television, commercial, digital, brand entertainment
- Parent: Vuelta Group (2023–)
- Subsidiaries: Roma, Los Angeles
- Website: www.indianaproduction.com

Indiana Production is an Italian multimedia company founded in December 2005 by Fabrizio Donvito and Marco Cohen. The international company has its headquarter in Milan, with subsidiaries in Rome and Los Angeles. Core business of the company is the production of a variety of contents: feature film, commercial, digital and branded content. Partners of the company are Fabrizio Donvito, Marco Cohen, Benedetto Habib and Karim Bartoletti.

== History ==
Indiana Production was founded in 2005 by Marco Cohen and Fabrizio Donvito. In 2008, Benedetto Habib joined the company as Partner an CFO. In 2015, Karim Bartoletti became Partner and Advertising Executive Producer. The company has realized ten feature films, two television movies, countless commercial campaigns, continuously working on numerous projects for the domestic and the international market.

In September 2023, it was announced that European production and distribution studio Vuelta Group had acquired Indiana Production, marking Vuelta Group's expansion into the Italian film and television operations.

== Cinema ==
=== Films ===
The first film by Indiana Production is Estômago directed by Marcos Jorge, produced in 2007 together with Zancrane Filmes, a Brazilian film production company.

Indiana Production collaborates with numerous directors, like Paolo Virzì who directed two feature films produced by the company: The First Beautiful Thing (2011) and Human Capital (2013); both winners of many awards and selected as Italian entries for the Best Foreign Films at the Academy Awards.

Italy in a Day (2014), directed by Gabriele Salvatores, was coproduced with Rai Cinema and Scott Free. The film is the Italian follow up of Life in a Day and is the result of 2.200 hours of footage (composed by 44.000 videos sent by Italian people). The documentary film was presented, out of competition, at the 71st edition of the Venice Film Festival.

Alaska (2015), is an Italian-French production (Indiana Production with 2.4.7 Films). Directed by Claudio Cupellini, the film was presented in occasion of the Rome Film Festival and won numerous awards including a Silver Ribbon for Best Scenography to Paki Meduri and an Italian Golden Globe to Elio Germano as Best Actor.

In 2015 Francesca Archibugi directed An Italian Name, film adaptation of the French piéce Le Prénom by Alexandre De La Patalliere and Matthieu Delaporte. In the same year was produced You Can't Save Yourself Alone, directed by Sergio Castellitto, that is the film adaptation of the book with the same name written by Margaret Mazzantini. The cast is composed by the Italian actors Riccardo Scamarcio, Jasmine Trinca, Anna Galiena with the participation of the Italian writer and songwriter Roberto Vecchioni. Still in 2015, was released Game Therapy, by Ryan Travis, an action movie produced by Indiana Production with Web Stars Channel and Pulse Films.

Produced in collaboration with La Piccola Società and Rai Cinema is A safe place, first feature film directed by Francesco Ghiaccio. The movie deals with the delicate topic of the Eternit tragedy. The film has been selected for numerous competitions winning also different awards. In the cast Marco D'Amore and Matilde Gioli.

Onda su Onda, coproduced with Less is More Productions, is a film released in February 2016: the third directing experience for Rocco Papaleo; the movie is an international production shot in the summer of 2015 in Italy and Uruguay. Beside the director, the young Argentinian actress Lutz Cipriota and the Italian actor Alessandro Gassmann.

The Greatest of All, directed by Carlo Virzì is a film from 2012 produced by Indiana Production with Motorino Amaranto and coproduced by Rai Cinema. The production was selected by the commission of Torino Film Festival 2011. The following year, Italian Movies by Matteo Pellegrini: an Italian comedy competing in the Rome Film Festival in the category “Prospettive Italia”. A production by Indiana Production together with Eagle Pictures, Lumiq Studios, Trikita (Ru) and Merenda Film.

Romeo&Juliet (2013) released in Italy in February 2015, is Carlo Carlei’s adaptation of Shakespeare’s masterpiece and another example of collaboration and internationality. A production by Amber Entertainment UK, Swarosky Entertainment, Echo Lake Entertainment and Indiana Production as executive producer.

Summertime (September 2016) is the latest film by Gabriele Muccino, a production by Indiana Production and Rai Cinema. It is the story of a journey among Rome, San Francisco, New Orleans and Cuba, told on a soundtrack composed by Jovanotti.

Indiana Production was a partner in Vision Distribution, a film studio created in 2016 with Sky Italia, ITV Studios-backed Cattleya, Fremantle-owned Wildside, Lucisano Media Group and Palomar. In December 2025, the company exited the Vision Distribution joint venture by relinquishing its 8% stake.

=== New projects ===
Soon in theatre The Leisure Seeker, by Paolo Virzì. Inspired by the book with the same name written by Michael Zadoorian, the film has in its cast the Hollywood star Donald Sutherland and the Academy Awards winner Helen Mirren. The shooting of the road movie took place in summer 2016, completely in English. The movie was premiered in competition at the 74th Venice International Film Festival. The production is by Indiana Production, with Rai Cinema in association with 3 Marys Entertainment in collaboration with Motorino Amaranto.

Still in competition at the 74th Venice International Film Festival is the second movie, after Darker Than Midnight, by Sebastiano Riso. Starring Micaela Ramazzotti and Patrick Bruel. The production is by Indiana Production with Rai Cinema in co-production with BAC Films.

=== Feature films ===
1. Estômago (2007) - Marcos Jorge
2. The First Beautiful Thing (2010) - Paolo Virzì
3. The Greatest of All (2012) - Carlo Virzì
4. Italian Movies (2013) - Matteo Pellegrini
5. Human Capital (2013) - Paolo Virzì
6. Italy in a Day (2014) - Gabriele Salvatores
7. An Italian Name (2015) - Francesca Archibugi
8. Romeo&Juliet (2015) - Carlo Carlei
9. You Can't Save Yourself Alone (2015) - Sergio Castellitto
10. Game Therapy (2015) - Ryan Travis
11. Alaska (2015) - Claudio Cupellini
12. A Safe Place (2015) - Francesco Ghiaccio
13. Onda su Onda (2016) - Rocco Papaleo
14. Summertime (2016) - Gabriele Muccino
15. The Leisure Seeker (2017) - Paolo Virzì
16. A Family (2017) - Sebastiano Riso
17. Couch Potatoes (2018) - Francesca Archibugi
18. I'm Back (2018) - Luca Miniero
19. The Burnt Orange Heresy (2019) - Giuseppe Capotondi
20. Promises (2021) - Amanda Sthers
21. Last Night of Amore (2023) - Andrea Di Stefano
22. Home Education (2023) - Andrea Niada
23. I Am the End of the World (2025) - Gennaro Nunziante

== Advertising ==
Indiana Production is one of the first production company in Italy that tries to intersect continuously cinema and advertising. Some example of this are the short films produced for some brands: like "Heartango" (2007) for Intimissimi, Senza Tempo for Peroni and still the short film teaser “She was here” (2012) for Lancia; all these films were directed by Gabriele Muccino.

=== Commercial/Digital/Branded Content ===
- Intimissimi "Heartango"
- Peroni “Senza Tempo”
- Volkswagen “Think Blue”
- Tim “La storia d’italia secondo Tim”
- Giorgio Armani “One plus one”
- Corto Lancia teaser “She was here”
- San Pellegrino “Italian Inspiration”
- Trussardi “My name”
- Intesa San Paolo “Storie impossibili”
- Fiat 500 “Paolo Sorrentino”
- Audi A3 “Through the Lenses”
- Fiat 500 “Vintage ‘57”
- Ottica Avanzi
- Dreher “Faidaters”
- Fiat 500 Masterpiece
- Regione Trentino
- Mc Donald’s "Great Tastes of America"
- Tim Impresa Semplice
- Baldini&Castoldi "Linus"
- Ottica Avanzi “Consigli mai visti”
- Pirelli “Be as you are”
- Suv si gira - SEAT
- MIBAC “Fortunato”
- Dodo Pomellato “100%Amore”
- Fiat 500 by Gucci
- Antipiracy “Copy”
- Fiat 500 by Diesel “Adult Movie”
- Fiat BSV “Parla come Panda”
- Telecom “Francesca”
- Volkswagen Beetle “ASAP”
- Telecom Olivetti “Il futuro è di chi sa sognarlo”
- Fiat Freemont Blackcode “Stylophonic”
- Lamborghini Asterion
- Audi “Fifty Shades of Grey”
- Real Time “Bake Off Italia”

== See also ==
- GA&A Productions
- Martha Production
- Lumiq Studios
- The Gunther Corporation
