= 1995–96 Serie A (women's football) =

Serie A
- Season: 1995–96
- Champions: Verona Gunther (1st title)
- Relegated: Perugia; G.E.A.S. ACS Delfino
- Matches: 240
- Goals: 823 (3.43 per match)
- Top goalscorer: Carolina Morace (39 goals)

The 1995–96 Serie A was the 26th season of the women's football top level league in Italy, and the 10th to be run under the auspices of the Italian Football Federation, through the Lega Nazionale Dilettanti (amateur division). ACF Agliana were the defending champions.

Verona Gunther secured the championship, with Carolina Morace winning the top scorer award for the ninth consecutive season.

== Review ==
Agliana won the 1994–95 league title by five points from rivals Torres. In March 1995 they had been purchased by a wealthy celebrity German Shepherd dog, Gunther IV, who became the honorary president.

Gunther IV resigned as Agliana's president in June 1995, when team captain Carolina Morace kissed controversialist politician Vittorio Sgarbi during a segment of the Il processo di Biscardi television programme. The decision of Maurizio Mian, who ran the Gunther Group controlling the dog's affairs, drew a withering response from Morace. Agliana's management swiftly broke off their connection with the Gunther Group, remarking: "these people have only one interest, that of advertising themselves".

Before the 1995–96 season, the Gunther Group instead sponsored Agliana's Serie A rivals Verona CF. The club became known as "Verona Gunther" and signed Italy women's national football team players Stefania Antonini, Manuela Tesse, Raffaella Salmaso, Adele Marsiletti and Florinda Ciardi. Carolina Morace also put her differences with Gunther IV aside and agreed to join the team.

Verona won the league and Sue Lopez characterised the ownership situation as: "Verona Gunther, who won the Italian Women's Championship in 1996, are sponsored by a group of pharmaceutical companies. For publicity purposes they appointed a dog, a German shepherd called Gunther IV, as 'president' of the club and he attends all matches as the 'club's benefactor'." A report in Die Tageszeitung was less charitable: "A fraudulent German shepherd haunts Italy's women's football and cannot get away from national player Morace".

== Standings ==
| Pos | Team | Pld | W | D | L | GF | GA | GD | Pts | Qualification or relegation |
|---|---|---|---|---|---|---|---|---|---|---|
| 1 | Verona Gunther (C) | 30 | 25 | 3 | 2 | 105 | 14 | +91 | 78 | Champions |
| 2 | Agliana | 30 | 21 | 5 | 4 | 91 | 35 | +56 | 68 | |
| 3 | Torino | 30 | 20 | 7 | 3 | 88 | 33 | +55 | 67 | |
| 4 | Torres | 30 | 17 | 8 | 5 | 48 | 23 | +25 | 59 | |
| 5 | Lugo | 30 | 15 | 7 | 8 | 64 | 39 | +25 | 52 | |
| 6 | Riva del Garda | 30 | 15 | 5 | 10 | 59 | 40 | +19 | 50 | |
| 7 | Fiammamonza | 30 | 13 | 6 | 11 | 52 | 42 | +10 | 45 | |
| 8 | Gravina | 30 | 13 | 5 | 12 | 44 | 43 | +1 | 44 | |
| 9 | Lazio CF | 30 | 12 | 7 | 11 | 60 | 51 | +9 | 43 | |
| 10 | ACF Milan | 30 | 11 | 9 | 10 | 35 | 43 | −8 | 42 | |
| 11 | Pisa | 30 | 10 | 5 | 15 | 49 | 70 | −21 | 35 | |
| 12 | Autolelli Picenum | 30 | 8 | 7 | 15 | 33 | 51 | −18 | 31 | |
| 13 | Cascine Vica | 30 | 9 | 4 | 17 | 33 | 57 | −24 | 31 | |
| 14 | Perugia (R) | 30 | 2 | 8 | 20 | 16 | 93 | −77 | 14 | Relegation to Serie B |
| 15 | G.E.A.S. (R) | 30 | 2 | 4 | 24 | 19 | 91 | −72 | 10 | Relegation to Serie B |
| 16 | Delfino (R) | 30 | 0 | 4 | 26 | 27 | 98 | −71 | 4 | Relegation to Serie B |

Updated to match(es) played on 18 May 1996. Source: https://www.rsssf.org/tablesi/italwomhist.html
Rules for classification: 1) Points; 2) Goal difference; 3) Number of goals scored; 4) Head-to-head points; 5) Head-to-head goal difference; 6) Head-to-head away goals scored
(C) Champions; (R) Relegated
