= Donkey Xote =

2007 film by José Pozo

- Theatrical release poster
- Directed by: José Pozo
- Written by: Angel E. Pariente
- Based on: Don Quixote by Miguel de Cervantes
- Produced by: Fabio Massimo Cacciatori; Julio Fernández; Sergio Toffetti; Franco Bevione
- Starring: Andreu Buenafuente; David Fernández; Sonia Ferrer; José Luis Gil
- Narrated by: Jordi González
- Edited by: Félix Bueno
- Music by: Andrea Guerra
- Production companies: Filmax Animation; Lumiq Studios; Acción Media; Don Quijote De La Mancha 2005, S.A. Bren Entertainment, S.A. Castelao Productions, S.A; TVE
- Distributed by: Filmax
- Release date: 22 November 2007
- Running time: 90 minutes
- Countries: Spain; Italy
- Languages: Spanish; English; Italian
- Budget: €13 million
- Box office: €12 million

Donkey Xote (known in some regions as Donkey X or Æslet) is a 2007 animated children's film produced by Lumiq Studios. A co-production between Spain and Italy, the film is directed by José Pozo and written by Angel Pariente, based on the Miguel de Cervantes novel Don Quixote, and features the voices of Andreu Buenafuente, David Fernández, Sonia Ferrer and José Luis Gil. The film has gained notoriety as a mockbuster as the lead character Rucio bears an intentional resemblance to Donkey from the Shrek film series, along with the poster and trailer having the tagline "From the producers who saw Shrek".

Donkey Xote was theatrically released on 22 November 2007 by Lumiq Studios and Filmax International. It grossed €12 million ($18 million) on a €13 million ($19 million) budget.

== Plot ==
The film begins with a narration of the story as told by Cervantes, but the narrator is interrupted by the donkey Rucio who insists on telling the "true" story of the adventure: Don Quixote was not crazy, but in fact an intelligent and passionate person. In Rucio's re-telling of his adventure with Don Quixote and his squire, Sancho Panza, we learn that Rucio wishes he were Quixote's horse, and that the horse, Rocinante, hates leaving his stable.

Quixote, Sancho, Rucio and Rocinante had gone on an adventure to search for Quixote's supposed true love Dulcinea but were unable to find her. However, Sancho lied that he saw her for a brief moment when Quixote was not with him, so Quixote firmly believes that Dulcinea is out there somewhere. Because of their adventure, Quixote and Sancho have become famous in their home village of La Mancha, much to the ire of their childhood acquaintance Bachelor Sansón Carrasco. Quixote and Sancho later learn from Carrasco that the region has been flooded with letters by one known as the Knight of the Crescent Moon who is searching for Quixote to challenge him to a duel in Barcelona on the next full moon. If the knight should win, Quixote will renounce both his knighthood and Dulcinea forever, but if Quixote be the winner, the knight will reveal the true identity of Dulcinea and give her all his treasures and possessions. Quixote decides to accept the knight's challenge, and to prepare him for his journey, Carrasco gives him the armour of a renowned knight. After Quixote, Sancho, Rucio and Rocinante depart for their journey, Carrasco reveals to his subordinate Avellaneda that he only helped Quixote and Sancho to look good in front of the townspeople and that his goal is to destroy the duo's fame and become more famous than them. To do this, he seeks to hire the services of Sinister Knight, a villain previously thought to have been made up by Quixote, to ensure Quixote and Sancho never make it to Barcelona in time for the duel. The armour that was given to Quixote is meant to hinder their progress.

Upon learning that Rocinante has left with Quixote, Rocinante's bodyguard James Rooster begins following the four to protect Rocinante. When the four reach El Toboso, the supposed home town of Dulcinea, they discover that many other men have received the letters from the Knight of the Crescent Moon and are impersonating Quixote to win Dulcinea's affections. While fighting a duo of thugs, Quixote's armour starts to move on its own erratically, for the soul of the knight who once wore the armour is imprisoned within it, and it can only be freed if it takes part in an act of courage. Thinking he has found Dulcinea, Quixote tries to profess his love for her, unaware that he is actually talking to a cardboard cutout behind a curtain. Avellaneda then makes off with the cardboard cutout in his carriage, tricking Quixote and Sancho into thinking Dulcinea has been kidnapped. James eventually catches up with the four, but as they continue making their way to Barcelona, they find a duchess being attacked by a lion and come to her rescue. Grateful for their help, the duchess invites Quixote and Sancho to come to her castle where the duke, her husband, resides. Unbeknownst to Quixote and Sancho, the lion, whose name is Bartolo, is actually the pet of the duke and duchess and was only pretending to attack the latter so she could trick Quixote and Sancho into coming to the castle to distract them from their journey to Barcelona. The duke and duchess offer to have their soldiers find those who "kidnapped" Dulcinea so Quixote can be with her, and they also offer to make Sancho governor of an island like he always dreamed of.

When Quixote isn't around, the duchess reveals to Sancho she is well aware of the fact he lied about seeing Dulcinea on the duo's first adventure and uses this knowledge to blackmail Sancho into telling Quixote the impostor the soldiers will bring back is the real Dulcinea. The impostor turns out to be an ungracious woman named Altisidora, and after Sancho reluctantly convinces Quixote that the impostor is Dulcinea, he and Rucio depart with the soldiers for his island. Quixote starts to have second thoughts about his love for Dulcinea after witnessing how rude Altisidora is. Rocinante later spies on the duke, duchess and Altisidora and learns that Sinister Knight and Avellaneda are paying them to keep Quixote and Sancho from reaching Barcelona so Carrasco's plan succeeds. Avellaneda's pet civet discovers Rocinante spying on them, so she and the duchess's mare trap him and James in the stable and set it on fire to kill them. Fortunately, a redeemed Bartolo comes to their rescue. Sancho soon realizes the soldiers are only leading him and Rucio to the middle of nowhere, so they hurry back to the castle just in time to stop the duke and duchess from pressuring Quixote into marrying Altisidora. Sancho finally confesses he lied about seeing Dulcinea, and a dejected Quixote leaves the castle with Sancho, Rucio and Rocinante. Quixote and Sancho consider heading home, but Rucio and Rocinante remember about the duel in Barcelona and bring their riders there. When they finally reach Barcelona, they discover that a jousting tournament is being held to find out who the real Quixote is due to the fact that the Quixote impostors from El Toboso are competing in the tournament. The winner of the tournament will face the Knight of the Crescent Moon in the title match.

Because Rocinante is too exhausted from the journey to Barcelona, Quixote chooses Rucio to be his steed for the tournament. James and Bartolo follow the four to Barcelona, and when Bartolo wanders into the stadium, almost all of the Quixote impostors flee at the sight of him, resulting in the tournament advancing directly to the semi-finals. Quixote wins the tournament, but just as the title match is about to begin, Sinister Knight tries to stop Quixote from competing in the battle. Rucio kicks Sinister Knight, revealing him to be Carrasco in disguise. He had taken the identity of Sinister Knight in the hopes that such an identity would finally make him famous. The duel begins, and Quixote finds himself overpowered by the Knight of the Crescent Moon. Carrasco pushes Quixote in the hopes that his opponent will fatally injure him, but Quixote's armour jumps in front of him to protect him, freeing the soul of the knight who was trapped inside it just then two red demons take him to The Underworld. After Sancho knocks Carrasco unconscious, Quixote and the knight continue their duel until Quixote surrenders and renounces Dulcinea so his opponent can have her, saying she deserves the best and bravest of knights. The knight realizes that only the real Quixote would renounce Dulcinea for the sake of her best interests, and after Quixote is declared the winner, the knight reveals "his" true identity as the real Dulcinea. She was searching for Quixote just as he was searching for her, but she needed to know if he did indeed exist, so she set up the entire tournament to find out if her true love was real or not. Quixote and Dulcinea profess their love for each other, and Rucio, Rocinante, James and Bartolo return home to La Mancha.

== Voice cast ==
- José Luis Gil as Don Quixote de La Mancha
- Luis Posada as Rucio
- Andreu Buenafuente as Sancho Panza
- David Fernández as Rocinante
- Sonia Ferrer as Dulcinea del Toboso
- Sancho Gracia as Sansón Carrasco
- Jordi Hurtado as Cronista Estadio de Justas
- Jordi González as El Narrador
- María Luisa Solá as Duquesa
- Félix Benito as Duque

== Production ==
The project entered pre-production in late 2004, and was a co-financed effort of Spain's 'Filmax Animation' and Italy's 'Lumiq Studios', with Lumiq handling 40% of the animation, making use of the combined work of over 150 technicians and Italian artists who specialize in 3D animation. While still in production, a distribution deal with Lusomundo was negotiated. The film's trailer was released in May 2007 at SIGGRAPH, and post-production on the feature continued through 2007.

== Release ==
=== Film and DVD ===
The film premiered on November 22, 2007, in Toledo, Spain, and had its festival premiere on November 27, 2007, at the Ourense International Film Festival. The film was introduced to the European Film Market in February 2008, and screened in March at the 10th annual 'Cartoon Movie' at Babelsberg Studios in Potsdam, Germany. First released in Spanish as Donkey Xote, the film was dubbed into other languages and had non-Spanish actors doing the voicework for international distribution. Among its non-Spanish release, it was released by Phase 4 Films as Donkey X in the U.S. and Canada, as Aasi ja puolikuun ritari (The donkey and the half-moon knight) in Finland, as Don Chichot in Poland, as Don Kihotis in Greece, as Don Kisot in Turkey, as Don Quijote szamarancsa in Hungary, as Donkey Schott in Germany, as Măgăruşul buclucaş (Troublesome Donkey) in Romania, as Les Folles Aventures De Rucio (Rucio's Crazy Adventures) in France. and as A Donkey's Tale in the United Kingdom.

=== Video game ===
One year after release of the film, a video game by the same name was commissioned of the company Revistronic Madrid with V.2 Play publishing it. The results were an adventure game for PC and PlayStation 2, one for PSP, and one for Nintendo DS which consisted of several mini-games tailored to the characteristics of the portable console.

== Reception ==
=== Critical response ===
Variety made note that the lead character of Rucio has an intentional resemblance to the character of Donkey from the Shrek series, with its original theatrical poster proclaiming "From the producers who saw Shrek". They noted that, while the physical resemblance was imported "almost wholesale", the character lacked the same wit as its inspiration. They wrote that the film was "a lively but clumsy comic retelling of the Cervantes classic" with a "humdrum" script. Ahora noted the same resemblance, writing that it was a blatant imitation done in order to take advantage of the existing commercial fanbase established by DreamWorks for the Shrek films. NonSoloCinema wrote that while the animation is well-made, the figures resemble characters from Pixar's early days and has obvious similarities to some of the stars of Shrek by DreamWorks. DVD Verdict offered that in order to market the film to a pre-teen audience, Rucio looks "suspiciously" like Donkey from the Shrek movies. Film Up wrote "The film (which in turn has inspired a video game of the same name), has the merit, in part, to be able to convince us and involve us, but sometimes, creativity and commitment, may not be enough, because the quality is more important, even if not always for everyone."

In making comparisons to other representations of the original novel, Rapadura wrote that the plot was encrusted with facts and comical characters, but was simpler. They offered that, while the opening sequences had a great pace and hinted at expectations of good insights of the script, it gave a misimpression of what followed. They wrote that the film had a "falta de graça" (lack of humor) in that it is a satire by "produtores que assistiram a Shrek" (producers who saw Shrek). Toward the story, they felt that screenwriter Angel Pariente was unable to create charisma in his characters and thus created a plot full of holes, and that the direction of Jose Pozo contributed to its failure. Another concern was that the soundtrack of American tunes, aimed toward winning a pre-teen audience, was repetitive and misapplied. In their own review, Cine Pop appreciated that the film was an attempt at reinterpretation of the classic Don Quixote, but felt that the script ends without cohesion with a flurry of small plots and a whirlwind of characters. They also felt that the tunes for the soundtrack, while daring, were unfortunate choices that did not meet the expected requirements of the scenes in which they were heard. They concluded by offering that the film did have two successes: first, the technique in animation was very well done. After developing the look of the characters, everything was impeccable. Second, the film is an incentive to re-read Don Quixote, acting to encourage young viewers to engage in the original book.

DVD Talk panned the film, writing "The best thing about Donkey Xote is its title, a whimsically mischievous little pun. The worst thing about Donkey Xote is everything else." They felt that, while the filmmakers asserted they were making a sequel to a literary classic, their work was less inspired by Cervantes, so much as it was DreamWorks. They noted the tone was "non-stop Shrek, so much so that the Eddie Murphy character gets a shout-out" when the character of Rucio jokes "the only talking donkey I know is a friend of mine who hangs out with a green ogre". The offered that the film's basic premise showed potential, in its setting up a tale where "years after Quixote's quests, Cervantes' chronicles of the tale have gone on to great success, and now every fool in the land wants to be his own Don Quixote. The real Quixote and Sancho Panza, meanwhile, remain poor, until word arrives of a knight festival culminating in a chance to win the hand of the lovely Dulcinea." They also granted that this set up had some "almost-clever moments" when the real Quixote has to prove himself "amidst a crowd of wannabees." But they argue that screenwriter Angel Pariente did not allow these moments to makes sense, thus making them too rare, and that the plot became so convoluted in jumping from tangent to tangent that sorting it out became "a major hassle". Unlike reviewers that felt the animation was a sole redeeming quality, they felt it appeared cheap, in that while background elements were rendered in great detail, they were "one-upped by blocky, generic character work and uninspired designs, all with a plastic look that feels rushed," giving the results a "bargain bin feel." They summarized that the film offered "a nonsensical plot and tiresome jokes, like a third-rate DreamWorks rip-off with half the story missing." DVD Verdict also panned the film, writing it was a "silly, nonsensical retelling" of the Don Quixote tale. They felt that as the film was based upon a classic novel filled with "memorably outlandish characters, loads of surreal plot twists, and compelling universal themes about the nature of identity and the conflict between reality and the imagination", the project concept had potential. But they offered that director Jose Pozo failed in reaching that goal, as his work failed "to congeal around a focused theme, its plot is a baffling semi-episodic affair full of narrative dead-ends and non sequiturs." They felt this was compounded by the characters becoming forgettable, "despite Quixote and Panza being two of the most distinctive characters in the entire history of literature," with Angel Pariente's adaptation to be "muddled and confused", with a gross misdevelopment of the characters. Cervantes' older, serious Don Quixote was reduced to be a clueless but handsome young man. Sancho Panza, one of the most likeable persons in the long history of sidekicks, was "transformed into a cynical, mercenary douche bag". The noble steed Rocinante "is an effeminate, neurotic loser", and the character of Rucio "lacks the personality to pull off his leading man status." In their comments toward the film being a poorman's copy of something from Pixar or DreamWorks, they noted the story included a lion that looked like Scar from The Lion King and a villain that has the same appearance as Syndrome from The Incredibles. They did note that while the animation was less supple than that of the two mentioned American firms, it was still impressive, but concluded that due to its mis-use of "beloved literary characters" and its "thieving from better animated features", the film was "a wanton act of bad taste." PopMatters offered that the "character design is so Shrek-like, the studio [DreamWorks Animation] should sue."

=== Awards and nominations ===
- 2008, Gaudí Awards nomination for Best Animated Feature (Millor Pel·lícula d'Animació)
- 2009, Goya Awards nomination for Best Animation Film (Mejor Película de Animación)

== Soundtrack ==
- "Dónde Están Mis Sueños", by Jordi Cubino, Performed by Marta Sánchez
- "A New Day Has Come", by Stephan Moccio and Aldo Nova, Performed by Elisabeth Gray
- "Hit Me With Your Best Shot", by Eddie Schwartz, Performed by Tessa
- "Born Free", by Don Black and John Barry, Performed by Alex Warner
- "True Colours", by Tom Kelly and Billy Steinberg, Performed by Elisabeth Gray
- "I Fought the Law", by Sonny Curtis, Performed by Alex Warner
- "Games People Play", by Joe South, Performed by Alex Warner
