= Martha Production =

Independent Italian film company

Martha Production S.R.L
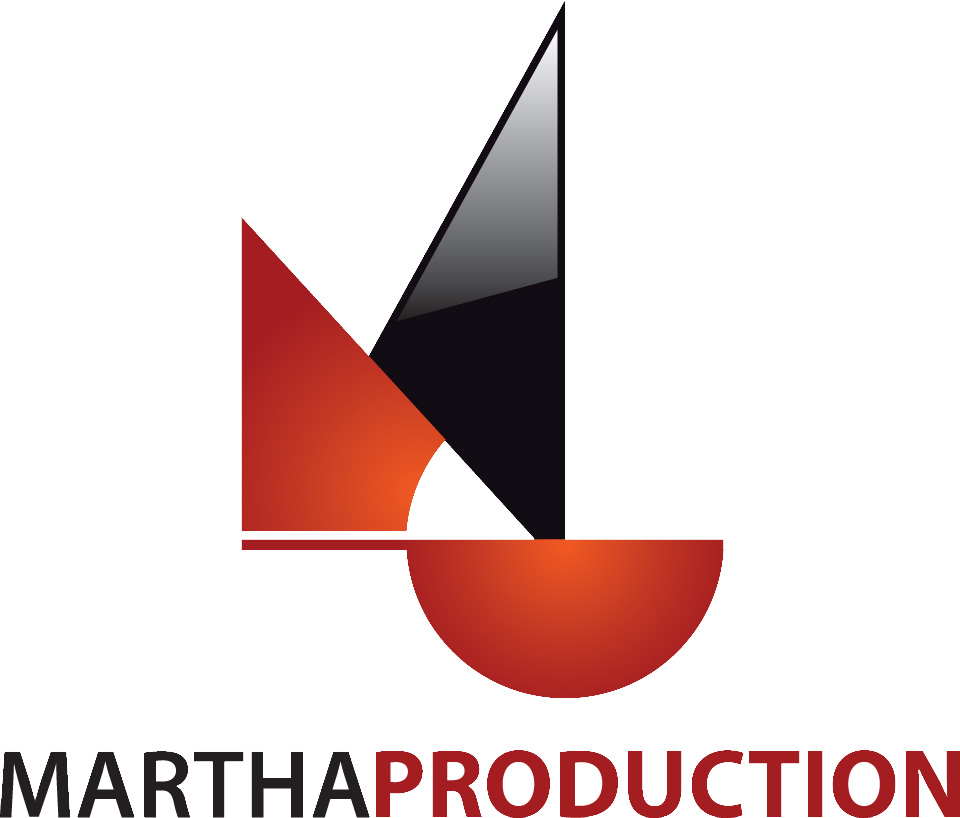
- Industry: Film
- Genre: Film Production and Distribution
- Founded: Rome, IT (2009; 17 years ago)
- Founder: Martha Capello
- Products: Film, Documentary, Animation, Short Film, TV Series
- Services: Film Production, Film Distribution,

Martha Production S.R.L is an independent Italian film production and distribution company based in Rome, Italy.

The company is currently acquiring and distributing films and documentaries globally. Alongside this activity, Martha Production is also producing films, documentaries, television formats and animation series.

== Productions ==
Martha Production S.R.L has produced several short films and documentaries. In 2008 the company produced the film "Inside of Me", a short film financed by the Ministry of Heritage and Culture, and in 2009, they produced "In the Belly of the Whale", a short film directed by Giuseppe Petitto, original screenplay by Martha Capello and Marisa Gentile, financed by the Lazio Region.

In 2010, Martha achieved the position of executive producer of the documentary "debut in Europe: Italian comedy", which screened in Venice Days of the Venice Film Festival and was immediately distributed in cinemas. In 2010, she produced the documentary "Encounter Generational" for the ACLI. Also, in 2010 she wrote the concept of an animation series entitled "Super Billy" and production will begin in 2011. Recently the company started developing the feature film "Lucy in the Sky", whose production will begin in the spring of 2014.

== Lucy in the Sky ==
The project "Lucy in the sky" was written by Giuseppe Petitto and Kim Gualino. It will be produced by Martha Capello and directed by Giuseppe Petitto in 2014.

== Africa Woman ==
The project "AFRICAN WOMAN" was created by Martha Capello & Dinamo Italia (producers) and Stefano Scialotti (the director). The film is a road film through Senegal, a journey to support the nomination of African Women for the Nobel Peace Prize. Actually, they are the unquestioned protagonists of the documentary: strong, tireless, always available, ironic and joyful, in these years they have been playing a key role both in daily life and the social and political activities of the African Continent. The journey-reportage is filled with spontaneous interviews, and it starts from the World Social Forum Dakar 2011, to arrive to Sendou, where women, during a big celebration, teach sex education to prevent AIDS. The journey continues with the women cooperate for fish drying in Bargny Minam village, then the women of the group Kaye Bahk of Mbour, which finance their agricultural activities through the micro-funding; and young girls from Pikine, a city in the suburbs of Dakar which through the project of school adoption during these years has reached a mainly female education. The journey goes on with the story of a polygamous family and the meeting with COFLEC (La Collectif des Femmes pour la Lutte contre l'Emigration Clandestine - association of women fighting against illegal immigration).

== Napoleon returns to Villa Borghese ==
The project "Napoleon returns to Villa Borghese" was created by Martha Capello (producer) and Alessio Jim Della Valle (the director). The film shows the extraordinary transportation of 69 statues from the Louvre Museum, in Paris, to Villa Borghese in Rome. The statues, once belonged to Scipione Borghese, ended up being part of the huge collection acquired by Napoleon during the 19th century and now have been placed back exactly where they originally were for the exhibition, thanks to the team of the expert maestro Angelo Minguzzi.

A crossed study made by the researchers of the Galleria together with the Louvre researchers, compared with the documentation found in the Vatican City, allowed to reproduce the same distribution of the works on the exhibition environment. The statues, among which there is the Borghese Vase, with Dionysian scenes, theSleepingHermaphroditus restored by a very young Bernini, the Silenus and young Bacchus, the Three Graces and the famous Centaur ridden by Love, which never before had left the Parisian Museum, have been meticulously transported for the first time after 200 years for the exhibition in Rome and are part of a wonderful show called “I Borghese e l'Antico”.

== Gypsy, A Man ==
The project " GYPSY, A MAN "was created by Martha Capello(producer) and Guido Farinella (the director). This is a documentary based on the music of the Gypsy community.

== OP - Under Special Surveillance ==
The project "OP - UNDER SPECIAL SURVEILLANCE" was created by Martha Capello (producer) and Giampiero Marrazzo. “Rome in the 1970s, a city given to the mafia from the complacent politicians. If not colluded, the city becomes a theatre of business scandal, managed by hidden, criminal powers, in to which a man from the cupola of Cosa Nostra, Pippo Calò, arrives. He has the ability to increase the mafia activity hundredfold in very little time through a new criminal organisation, called Banda della Magliana.

== See also ==
- Lumiq Studios
- Indiana Production
- ORBIS Production
- The Gunther Corporation
