= Changes (2009 film) =

- Czech: Proměny
- Directed by: Tomáš Řehořek
- Screenplay by: Tomáš Řehořek
- Produced by: Nelly Jenčíková, Fabio Massimo Cacciatori (co-producer), Franco Bevione (co-producer)
- Music by: Nancy Sexton
- Production companies: Miracle Film & TV, Lumiq Studios
- Release date: 2009
- Running time: 90 minutes
- Countries: Czech Republic, Italy
- Language: Czech

Changes (Czech: Proměny) is a film released in 2009, written and directed by Tomáš Řehořek.

The production was presented at the Cannes Film Festival in May 2012.

== Plot ==
Four stories, four dramatic destinies about real people. The first, a rich businessman who solve his infertility problems but little matter to his wife. Then a mother, poor and with two children, who can not rely on anyone but herself in a chaotic city. A middle age man, who learns not to be able to build social relationships after a life spent in working. And an older woman, whose life was entirely spent in search of a meaning. Four people affected by the same unjust fate, that strikes everyone without discrimination, living stories than speak on family, inner expiation and love.

== Cast ==
- Alena Ambrová
- Petra Hřebíčková
- Petr Jeništa
- Ivan Kalina
- Norbert Lichý
- Jan Plouhar
- Luděk Randár
- Tomáš Řehořek
- Jiří Vyorálek
- Jan Zadražil
- Dita Zábranská

== Production ==
The film project is a production Miracle Film & TV and Lumiq Studios (Turin).
