= Vuelta Group =

Irish film and media studio

Vuelta Media
- Type: Private
- Industry: Media
- Founded: 20 July 2023; 3 years ago
- Founder: Jérôme Lévy; David Atlan-Jackson
- Headquarters: Dublin, Ireland
- Key people: Jérôme Lévy (CEO); David Atlan-Jackson (head of production)
- Owner: Jérôme Lévy; David Atlan-Jackson
- Number of employees: 15 (2024)
- Subsidiaries: Playtime; SquareOne; Scanbox; Pan-Européenne; Indiana Production; WW Entertainment
- Website: Vuelta

Vuelta Group is an Irish film and media studio founded in 2023 by Jérôme Lévy and David Atlan-Jackson that combines production, distribution, and international sales operations across several countries. It is based in Dublin, Ireland.

== History ==
Vuelta Group was launched in July 2023 by Jérôme Lévy and David Atlan-Jackson through the acquisition of several European companies—Playtime in France, SquareOne in Germany, and Scanbox in Scandinavia—resulting in the creation of a pan-European film studio combining production, sales, and distribution.

Across its European network, Vuelta’s labels release roughly 100 films annually, including both internally produced titles and acquisitions ranging from European works to US independent cinema.

In 2026, Vuelta presented fifteen films at the Cannes Film Festival, with titles featured across various sections of the event. Among them were The Electric Kiss (La Vénus électrique) by Pierre Salvadori, selected as the festival's opening film, and Paper Tiger by James Gray.

=== Acquisitions ===
In September 2023, Vuelta further expanded by acquiring a stake in the Italian production company Indiana Production.

En October 2023, Vuelta has secured $100m in funding from US private equity firm Great Mountain Partners. In 2024, it also merged Global Screen and Film Constellation to create Global Constellation.

In October 2024, Vuelta Group acquired WW Entertainment, one of the major film distributors in the Benelux.

In March 2025, Vuelta Group took a minority stake in Italian distribution and international sales company PiperFilm.

In April 2025, Vuelta Group completed the integration of German entities including SquareOne Entertainment and Telepool into its broader operations.

In April 2025, the group's international sales division Playtime completed a full acquisition and merger of sales entities including Film Constellation and Global Screen, creating a unified international sales operation to enhance global reach and streamline film distribution.

== Productions ==
- A Little Something Extra
- Longlegs
- Past Lives
- Civil War
- The Seed of the Sacred Fig (Winner of the Jury Prize at Cannes Film Festival 2024)
- The Marching Band (Seven César Award nominations 2025)
- Eagles Of The Republic
- Buen camino
