= Teatro Verga =

- Interactive map of Teatro Verga
- Coordinates: 37.5124°N 15.0716°E
- Capacity: 1000

Construction
- Opened: 1969
- Rebuilt: 1981

Website
- http://www.teatrostabilecatania.it/

Teatro Verga is a theatre or performance stage located in Via Giuseppe Fava #34 in Catania, Sicily, Italy. It is located a few blocks south of the Stadio Angelo Massimino, the main soccer arena in the city. The theater is the headquarters of the Teatro Stabile di Catania, which mainly sponsors works by regional authors.

The theatre was built in 1969, after renovating an old cinema. The hall was given the name of Teatro delle Muse, and became the main theater company of the Teatro Stabile di Catania. Equipped with a spacious hall and a gallery, it has over 1,000 seats. In January 1981 the theater was destroyed by fire but was immediately rebuilt and in less than a year became available again. The new theatre is named after the writer Giovanni Verga.
