= Virtual Reality & Multi Media Park =

Italian company based in Turin, Italy

- Company type: public limited company
- Industry: multimedia, technology, virtual reality
- Founded: 2000
- Headquarters: Turin, Italy
- Key people: Fabio Massimo Cacciatori (CEO, Lumiq Studios); Andrea Piersanti (President); Franco Bevione, (General manager)
- Website: http://www.vrmmp.it

Virtual Reality & Multi Media Park is an Italian company based in the former film studios Fert in Turin, Italy. The company was created by Turinese and Piedmontese public bodies and is now a public property.

Virtual Reality & Multi Media Park operates in the fields of digital creativity, virtual reality, audiovisual and Multimedia. It is also manager of the Digital Creativity and Multimedia Hub in Turin.

Virtual Reality & Multi Media Park S.p.A. is currently in liquidation and has sold the line of business called «Vr – Asa».

== Areas of expertise ==
Virtual Reality & Multi Media Park operates in different areas of expertise:

- Virtual reality: simulations in medical, entertainment, cultural heritage, construction industry, architecture, urban development, transport and event planning sectors.
- Computer graphics: creation of CGI and 3D images, animation, movies and television production, architecture, engineering and art.
- Multimedia: video, still and animated images, music, text, interactivity.

== Film entertainment ==
In Virtual Reality & Multi Media Park spaces Lumiq Studios works. Lumiq is a company 100% owned by Virtual, operating in the fields of movie production and distribution in the Piedmont landscape. Through its studios, Lumiq operates in the design, development, production and marketing of products and services for film, television, advertising, multimedia and new media.
