= Senza tempo =

2010 film by Gabriele Muccino

- Directed by: Gabriele Muccino
- Written by: Ian Cassie; Richard Ward; Jai Harji
- Produced by: Lorella Stortini
- Starring: Francesco Scianna; Gioia Marzocchi
- Cinematography: Arnaldo Catinari
- Production company: Indiana Production Company
- Distributed by: Peroni Nastro Azzurro, SABMiller plc
- Release date: 4 August 2010
- Running time: 4 minutes
- Country: United Kingdom
- Language: Italian

Senza tempo (Italian for 'Timeless') is a 2010 short film by Italian director Gabriele Muccino (director of The Last Kiss, Remember Me, My Love and The Pursuit of Happyness). The film is the result of a collaboration between Peroni Nastro Azzurro and Muccino and was shown in cinemas throughout the UK.

== Production ==
The film was made as a joint production between Peroni's ad agency The Bank and Muccino's company Indiana Production. It is part of Accademia del Film Peroni Nastro Azzurro, which promotes the iconic world of Italian film in the UK by celebrating the principles that have made and continue to make the Italian craft of film-making so unique. Part of the film's creation included giving a group of hand-picked, up and coming film talent the opportunity to learn these principles directly from Muccino himself during the creation of the film.
