= Kyle Dean Massey =

American actor and singer (born 1981)

- Born: November 17, 1981 (age 44); Arkansas, U.S.
- Education: Southwest Missouri State University
- Occupations: Actor, singer, Co-Founder/Director of Operations
- Years active: 2004–present
- Spouse: Taylor Frey (m. 2016)
- Children: 1
- Website: www.kyledeanmassey.com, www.elevatebaby.com

Kyle Dean Massey (born November 17, 1981) is an American actor and singer. He is best known for his leading roles in the Broadway musicals Wicked – for which he has played Fiyero on-and-off from 2007 to 2019 – Next to Normal, and Pippin. He played the recurring role of openly gay country music songwriter Kevin Bicks on the ABC/CMT musical drama series Nashville (2015–2018).

== Career ==
Massey first joined the North American touring production of Wicked in 2007, as part of the ensemble and understudy for the lead role of Fiyero, before joining the Broadway production. He subsequently played Thalia in Broadway's Xanadu from April 2008 until its closing that September, and Matthew in Altar Boyz Off-Broadway from October 2006 to June 2007.

From June to September 2009, he temporarily played the role of Gabe in the Broadway musical Next to Normal, after which he remained as a cover for the role, before assuming the role permanently in January 2010. Massey stayed with the show until it closed in January 2011, when he then returned to Broadway's Wicked, this time in the lead role of Fiyero. He left in March of that year to star in Lucky Guy, which opened Off-Broadway in April 2011.

Following the closure of Lucky Guy, he returned to Wicked as Fiyero, covering for Richard H. Blake, who took a three-week absence to be with his newborn child. He later returned to the touring production of Wicked, playing Fiyero from November 2011 through February 2012. On July 31, 2012, he once again joined Broadway's Wicked as Fiyero until May 26, 2013. He played the role again in the Broadway production from December 2013 to February 2014. He appeared in 2012 Broadway Bares with Miriam Shor. In August 2013, he played Tony in The Muny production of West Side Story.

On April 1, Massey assumed the title role in the Broadway revival of Pippin. He finished his run on October 29.

On January 23, 2015, it was reported that Massey was cast in a recurring role as openly gay country music songwriter Kevin Bicks in the ABC television musical drama series Nashville.

== Personal life ==
Massey grew up in Jonesboro, Arkansas where his father is a Certified Public Accountant and his mother is a teacher. He attended Blessed Sacrament Catholic School for elementary school. Massey received a BFA in Musical Theatre from Southwest Missouri State University (now Missouri State University) in 2004.

Massey is gay. He married fellow actor Taylor Frey on October 1, 2016. He supports the It Gets Better Project. On April 22, 2021, he and Frey announced that they were expecting their first child via surrogacy. The couple welcomed their daughter, Rafa Massey-Frey, via surrogate on October 31, 2021.

== Filmography ==
=== Film ===
Year	Title	Role	Notes
2010	Sex and the City 2	Wedding chorus	
2013	Contest	Kyle Prylek	

=== Television ===
Year	Title	Role	Notes
2009	Cupid	Mira's son	Episode: "Live and Let Spy"
2012	Up All Night	Singer #6	Episode: "The Proposals"
2012	Hart of Dixie	Bus driver	Episode: "Bachelorettes & Bullets"
2012	The Good Wife	Warren Nemec	Episode: "A Defense of Marriage"
2013	Inside Amy Schumer	Male co-star	Episode: "A Porn Star Is Born"
2015–2018	Nashville	Kevin Bicks	15 episodes; recurring role: Seasons 3–4; guest role: Seasons 5-6
2017–present	Sunny Day	Johnny-Ray	Voice role; recurring role
2019	A Merry Christmas Match	Ryder Donnelly	Hallmark TV movie
2022	A Christmas to Treasure	Everett	Lifetime TV movie
2024	The Holiday Exchange	Sean	TV Movie

=== Web ===
Year	Title	Role	Notes
2012	Pzazz 101	Himself	Episode: "My Vaseline Brings All the Boys to the Yard"
2013	It Could Be Worse	Predator	2 Episodes

== Stage credits ==
Year	Title	Role	Venue
2001	The Secret Garden	Lt. Ian Shaw	Missouri State University
2001	A New Brain	Gordon Michael Schwinn	Missouri State University
2003	West Side Story	Tony	Missouri State University
2004	42nd Street	Billy Lawlor	National Tour & Japan
2005	The Music Man	Ensemble	Fulton Theatre
2006	Altar Boyz	Matthew	Off-Broadway
2007–2008	Wicked	Ensemble (Understudy: Fiyero)	National Tour
2008	Xanadu	Thalia (Understudy: Sonny)	Helen Hayes Theatre
2008-2009	Wicked	Ensemble (Understudy: Fiyero)	Gershwin Theatre
2009–2011	Next to Normal	Gabe Goodman	Booth Theatre: June – September 2009; January 2010 – January 2011
2011	Wicked	Fiyero Tigelaar	Gershwin Theatre: January – March 2011
2011	Lucky Guy	Billy Ray Jackson	Little Shubert Theatre
2011	Wicked	Fiyero Tigelaar	Gershwin Theatre: August – September 2011
2011-2013	Wicked	Fiyero Tigelaar	National Tour: November 2011 – February 2012
2011-2013	Wicked	Fiyero Tigelaar	Gershwin Theatre: July 2012 – May 2013
2013	West Side Story	Tony	The Muny
2013-2014	Wicked	Fiyero Tigelaar	Gershwin Theatre: December 2013 – February 2014
2014–2015	Pippin	Pippin	Music Box Theatre: April – October 2014
2014–2015	Pippin	Pippin	National Tour: November 2014 – March 2015
2016	The Pirates of Penzance	Frederic	Barrington Stage Company
2017	Wicked	Fiyero Tigelaar	Gershwin Theatre: June - July 2017
2016–2017	Jekyll & Hyde	Dr. Henry Jekyll / Mr. Edward Hyde	International tour
2018	The Boys in the Band	Standby (Donald, Larry, Cowboy)	Booth Theatre
2018	Wicked	Fiyero Tigelaar	Gershwin Theatre: November 2018
2019	Wicked	Fiyero Tigelaar	Gershwin Theatre: August – October 2019
2020	Company	Theo	Bernard B. Jacobs Theatre: March 2020 (previews)
