= Armando Pugliese =

Italian stage director (1947–2024)

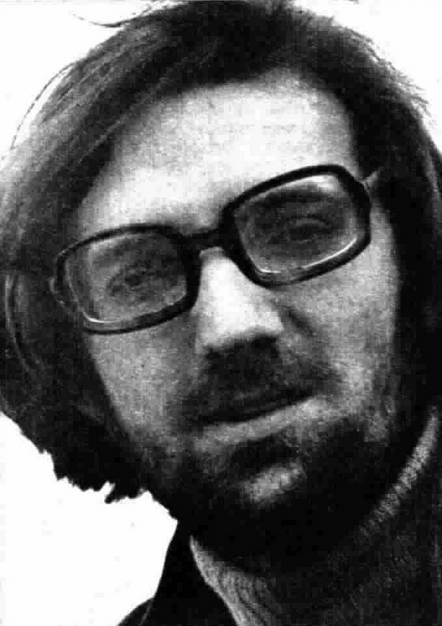
- Pugliese in 1972
- Born: 22 September 1947; Naples, Italy
- Died: 18 June 2024 (aged 76); Naples, Italy
- Occupation: Stage director

Armando Pugliese (22 September 1947 – 18 June 2024) was an Italian stage director, playwright and actor.

== Life and career ==
Born in Naples, Pugliese was a pupil of Orazio Costa at the Accademia Nazionale di Arte Drammatica Silvio D'Amico, from which he graduated in 1969; the same year he made his professional debut serving as assistant director of Luca Ronconi and directing the Elvio Porta's play Barocco ineffabile con strumenti. In the 1970s, he continued his collaboration with Ronconi, notably assisting him in the critically acclaimed L'Orlando Furioso, and in 1974 he had his breakout with Masaniello, which he directed and co-wrote with Porta and which was a critical and commercial success, spanning numerous editions.

Between 1981 and 1984 Pugliese served as artistic director of the stage company Cooperativa Teatro Sud, with whom he took part in the 1984 Venice Biennale Teatro. After collaborating with various theaters and institutions such as Teatro Argentina and Teatro Stabile di Catania, in 1997 he started a long collaboration as artistic director with the "Compagnia delle Indie Occidentali" theater company.

During his career Pugliese wrote and directed several plays for Lina Sastri, and his collaborations include Turi Ferro, Mario Scaccia, Enzo Moscato, Luca De Filippo, Pappi Corsicato. As an actor, he appeared in character roles in films by Lina Wertmüller, Pasquale Festa Campanile and Vincenzo Salemme, among others. He died in Naples on 18 June 2024, at the age of 76.
