= I Am the End of the World =

2025 comedy film

- Directed by: Gennaro Nunziante
- Screenplay by: Gennaro Nunziante; Angelo Duro
- Starring: Angelo Duro
- Cinematography: Massimiliano Kuveiller
- Edited by: Pietro Morana
- Distributed by: Vision Distribution
- Release date: 9 January 2025
- Running time: 96 minutes
- Country: Italy
- Language: Italian

I Am the End of the World (Italian: Io sono la fine del mondo) is a 2025 Italian black comedy film directed by Gennaro Nunziante and starring Angelo Duro.

== Plot ==
In Rome, Angelo, a vehicle for hire driver specialized in taking drunk teenagers home, is contacted by his sister Anna who lives in Palermo, who asks him to take care of their elderly parents, Franco and Rita.

Angelo and his parents have had no relationship for years, so he initially refused the job. However, he was forced to wait a month for the repair of his car, which was necessary for his work, so he decided to accept the job from his sister in the end.

In the previous months, his parents had begun to regularly see a psychologist, as recommended to them by their doctor in the hope of curing the first signs of depression that were beginning to appear in the two. It was the psychologist who advised his daughter Anna to contact her brother, both to allow her to go on vacation and to try to reconnect Angelo with his parents.

In the meantime, Angelo arrives in Palermo and Anna leaves, leaving her parents in the hands of her brother, who immediately shows himself hostile towards them. Despite this, he continues to accompany them to the doctor and the psychologist, but at the same time, he tries to make the two's lives miserable in order to take revenge for how they wronged him throughout his childhood.

During his stay, he deprives his father of his favorite foods and his beloved wine, even though the doctor had found him in excellent physical health and able to consume any type of food. He also forces his mother with osteoporosis to walk up their bundling's stairs instead of using the elevator, claiming she needs more exercise.

In the following days, Angelo meets the substitute of his parents' family doctor, Dr. Marta Pedrotta. Angelo repeatedly asks her if his parents could have a stroke, heart attack or ischemia at any moment, in the hopes of getting rid of his parents. Marta falsely interprets this as Angelo being sensitive and caring, and she becomes romantically interested in him.

Angelo eventually meets the doctor's son, Gabriele, and one evening, during a shift at the hospital, Marta asks Angelo to take Gabriele home. Angelo not only takes him to eat junk food forbidden to him by his parents because he is obese, but he also allows Gabriele to drive his mother's car.

Meanwhile, Anna and her husband Nando are continuing their vacation on a sailboat with friends, but Anna becomes increasingly worried about her parents. She is unable to contact her parents in any way because, unknown to her, Angelo has tampered with his parents' phones. Eventually, Anna seems to almost go crazy and her friends become fed up with her. Her husband Nando eventually leaves her and makes her leave on a small motorboat.

Meanwhile, Franco and Rita are still attempting to reconnect with their son. The mother suggests to her husband that they leave their house in Palermo to Angelo, so that he can benefit from it after their death. As soon as he inherits it, Angelo puts the house up for sale, almost giving his parents a heart attack when they find out.

In September, Angelo leaves to return to Rome. Anna returns to Palermo and is forced to take her parents into her house, since they had nowhere to stay after Angelo sold their house.

In the meantime, Angelo decides to quit his job as a driver and is summoned to court, because Dr. Pedrotta's ex-husband reported her for having entrusted their son to Angelo who let the child drive a car. The hearing ends quickly and Angelo is acquitted of all charges. As he leaves the courthouse, he meets his sister Anna with her son Carlo, a Carabinieri officer. Carlo reveals that Anna took Franco and Rita to a nursing home. Angelo then decides to pick up his parents from the nursing home and load them into his new camper to take them to Switzerland; the two parents are initially enthusiastic, until, in horror, they learn the reason for the trip: euthanasia is legal in Switzerland.

== Cast ==
- Angelo Duro as Angelo
- Giorgio Colangeli as Franco
- Matilde Piana as Rita
- Simone Montedoro as the psychologist
- Marilù Pipitone as Marta
- Evelyn Famà as Anna
- Carlo Ferreri as Nando
- Angelo Russo as the taxi driver

== Production ==
The film marked the screenwriting and leading role debut for Angelo Duro. It was shot in Palermo and Rome between June and July 2024. It was produced by Indiana Production and Vision Distribution, in collaboration with Sky.

== Release and reception ==
The film was released in Italian cinemas by Vision Distribution on 9 January 2025.

In spite of its lack of press and television marketing, the film was a commercial success, topping the Italian box office for two weeks, grossing over 9 million euros, with over 1.2 million admissions.

Lorenzo Ciofani from Cinematografo criticized the film's narrative structure, characterization, and excessive use of political incorrectness.
