= Shoulder Dance =

2023 American LGBTQ+ romantic dramedy film

- Theatrical film poster
- Directed by: Jay Arnold
- Written by: Jay Arnold
- Produced by: Jay Arnold; Rod Hamilton; Frank Lomento
- Starring: Matt Dallas; Rick Cosnett; Taylor Frey; Samuel Larsen; Maggie Geha
- Cinematography: Michael Franks
- Release dates: February 24, 2023 (Hollywood); November 14, 2023 (USA)
- Running time: 103 minutes
- Country: United States
- Language: English

Shoulder Dance is a 2023 American LGBTQ+ romantic comedy-drama film, directed by Jay Arnold. The film stars Matt Dallas, Rick Cosnett, Taylor Frey, Samuel Larsen, and Maggie Geha. It premiered at the Hollywood Reel Independent Film Festival in 2023, before being in limited theatrical release in select cities throughout the United States later that year.

== Synopsis ==
The slippery lines between friends and lovers threaten to trip up two couples—one gay, one straight—over a wild weekend of seductive games, all-out indulgence, and unraveling revelations in this award-winning romantic dramedy.

== Cast ==
- Matt Dallas as Ira
- Rick Cosnett as Roger
- Taylor Frey as Josh
- Samuel Larsen as Shawn
- Maggie Geha as Lilly
- Blake Cooper Griffin as Tony
- Dana DeRuyck as Rita
- Scott Alan Ward as Dancer (uncredited)

== Reception ==
Farid-Ul-Haq of The Geekiary extolled the film's genre: "I’m okay with watching messy rom-coms when I know what to expect. Yes, there were comedic elements in this movie, but in my opinion, [it] played out as more of a horror movie about toxic relationships. And the toxicity felt a bit too real." Markos Papdatos of The Digital Journalist gave it 4/5 stars and praised the lead actor: "Matt Dallas delivers a passionate performance as Ira, and his affecting rapport with Josh allows for more resonance." Nicholas Attanasio of Out in Jersey rated it 4/5 stars and lauded the film: "While it may not be a top-tier queer romantic drama, it is worth checking out. It is recommended for those who enjoy mushy romance films with great, inspiring messages." Katie Huff of MXDWN scored it 1/5 and opined: "Unfortunately, [the film] was quite a let-down for such an interesting premise. However, Maggie Geha's performance was one good thing to come from it, and I hope to see her in more large roles down the line."
