= Taylor Frey =

American actor

- Born: April 28, 1986 (age 40); Oslo, Norway
- Education: Brigham Young University
- Occupations: Founder of Elevate Baby, Actor
- Years active: 2010–present
- Spouse: Kyle Dean Massey (m. 2016)
- Children: 3
- Website: elevatebaby.com

Taylor Frey is an American actor. He is best known for playing Don Hagerty in It Chapter Two (2019).

== Education ==
Taylor attended Viewmont High School and got his bachelor's from Brigham Young University. Due to BYU's honor code forbidding "homosexual contact," he was almost expelled during his time there. The school later cleared him for lack of evidence.

== Career ==
Frey has appeared in G.B.F., Gossip Girl, The Carrie Diaries, Gabriele Muccino's Summertime, Shoulder Dance, and It Chapter Two, and Days of Our Lives. He began his career as a Broadway actor. He performed in the plays: national tour of Hairspray How to Succeed in Business Without Really Trying, South Pacific, Finian's Rainbow, and The View UpStairs.

== Filmography ==
Film / Television
Year	Title	Role	Notes
2010	Live from Lincoln Center (TV Series)	Petty Officer Hamilton Steeves	(TV Series), 1 episode: "South Pacific"
2010	Gossip Girl (TV Series)	Cater-Waiter	(TV Series), 1 episode: "Dr. Estrangeloved"
2011	The Miraculous Year	Tyler	(TV Movie)
2012	Days of Our Lives	Dustin / Justin	(TV Series), 5 episodes
2013	The Carrie Diaries	Ninja / Paul Cunningham	(TV Series), 1 episode: "Strings Attached"
2013	G.B.F.	'Topher	(Film)
2016	Summertime	Matt	(Film)
2019	A Date by Christmas Eve	Rod	(TV Movie)
2019	It Chapter Two	Don Hagarty	(Film)
2020	Secrets in the Woods	Brant	(TV Movie)
2022	Shoulder Dance	Josh	(Film)
2022	A Christmas To Treasure	Austin	Lifetime Movie
2024	The Holiday Exchange	Wilde Williams	Film

== Personal life ==
Frey grew up Mormon. His hometown is Centerville, UT. He is gay. Frey married American actor and singer Kyle Dean Massey in 2016 in Palm Springs, CA. On April 22, 2021, he and Massey announced that they were expecting their first child via surrogacy. The couple welcomed their daughter, Rafa Massey-Frey, via surrogate in October, 2021. They welcomed their second daughter, Gigi Massey-Frey, via surrogate in May, 2024. They welcomed their third child and first son, Savoy Massey-Frey, via surrogate in February, 2026.
