= Summertime (2016 film) =

2016 film

- Film poster
- Directed by: Gabriele Muccino
- Screenplay by: Gabriele Muccino; Dale Nall
- Story by: Fausto Brizzi; Marco Marzini
- Produced by: Marco Cohen; Fabrizio Donvito; Benedetto Habib
- Starring: Brando Pacitto; Matilda Lutz; Taylor Frey; Joseph Haro
- Cinematography: Paolo Caimi
- Edited by: Valentina Brunetti
- Music by: Jovanotti
- Production companies: Indiana Production; Rai Cinema
- Distributed by: 01 Distribution
- Release date: 1 September 2016 (VFF)
- Running time: 103 minutes
- Country: Italy
- Languages: Italian; English

Summertime (Italian: L'estate addosso) is a 2016 Italian comedy film written and directed by Gabriele Muccino.

== Cast ==
- Brando Pacitto as Marco
- Matilda Lutz as Maria
- Taylor Frey as Matt
- Joey Haro as Paul
- Jessica Rothe as Jules
- Scott Bakula as Paul's father
- Guglielmo Poggi as Vulcano
- Jacopo Carta as Lorenzo
- Ruggero Francica Nava as Francesco
- Nicoletta Cifariello as Giulietta
- Alberto Molinari as Marco's father
- Filippo Tirabassi as Stefano
- Ludovico Tersigni as Federico
- Daniela Zanchini as the insurer
- Laura Cayouette as Paul's mother
- Timothy Martin (artist) as Ken, Paul's boss
- Dharma Mangia Woods as Marco's girlfriend
- Tatiana Luter as Amy
