= The Gunther Corporation =

Italian multi-media production company

- Company type: Media and Entertainment
- Industry: Media and Entertainment
- Founded: Nassau, Bahamas
- Headquarters: Nassau, Bahamas
- Revenue: $400 million USD

The Gunther Corporation, formed in 1997, is a multi-media production company based in Pisa, Italy. It operates several divisions, including a marketing department headed by Glam Management. Its CEO Maurizio Mian often uses his dog Gunther as a figurehead for his investments in sports clubs, property and media.

Outside Italy, the Gunther Corporation owns several companies including the Gunther Reform Trust in the Bahamas. The trust is responsible for all financial aspects of the corporation. The Gunther Corporation was a client of DindyCo public relations marketing.

== History ==
One of the company's early successes was its Miami club show The Burgundians, which toured South Florida in the summer of 1999. Featuring local dancers and performers the show's title song received a limited release in Europe.

The Gunther Corporation have been responsible for a series of media stunts both in Italy and America, most notably the purchase of the Miami Mansion of Madonna in June 2000. This caused a media stir when a German Shepherd dog was unveiled as the new owner.

In January 2006, The Gunther Corporation went into production with the television special Global Revolution. The story of this musical film focused on a group of individuals living their life under a new ideology. It aired on 26 March 2006 on Italian television.

In the summer of 2006, The Gunther Corporation purchased Pontedera Football Club and regularly stage excerpts from Global Revolution during the half time entertainment.

== Filmography ==
- Global Revolution (2006)

== See also ==
- Martha Production
- Lumiq Studios
- Indiana Production
- ORBIS Production
