= Martin Werner =

Mexican investment banker

Martín Werner Wainfeld is an Argentine-born Mexican businessman and a director of Grupo Aeroportuario Centro Norte, S.A.B. de C.V. He was previously co-head of investment banking in Latin America at Goldman Sachs.

== Early life and education ==
Werner has a bachelor's degree from the Instituto Tecnológico Autónomo de México and a Ph.D. in economics from Yale University.

== Career ==
In 1994, Werner was appointed assistant director of telecommunications in Mexico's Zedillo administration. During the Mexican peso crisis, the Ministry of Finance hired Werner as under-secretary to assist with the economic recovery. Werner joined Goldman Sachs in 2000 and became co-head of its investment banking business in Latin America.

In 2016, Werner left Goldman and co-founded DD3 Capital Partners.
