= Lamberto Puggelli =

Italian stage and opera director

Lamberto Puggelli (1938 – 11 August 2013) was an Italian stage and opera director.

Born in Milan, in 1958 Puggelli graduated at the Accademia dei filodrammatici in Milan, then in the early sixties he began his career as a theater director for the Festival of Two Worlds in Spoleto. At the end of the sixties he also began to direct operas in Italy and abroad.

In the Seventies he worked with the Piccolo Teatro in Milan, at first as an assistant director of Giorgio Strehler then signing some works. He also staged several operas at the La Scala theater, his first in 1966 (Puccini's Turandot). For many years he has collaborated with the Teatro Stabile di Catania, becoming its artistic director in 2007. He directed more than 300 works between prose and opera.

He died in Trecastagni, Catania after a long illness.
