= Gabriele Muccino =

Italian film director (born 1967)

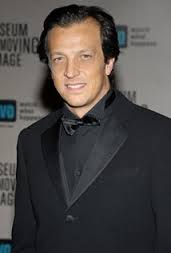
- Muccino in 2015
- Born: 20 May 1967 (age 59); Rome, Italy
- Education: Centro Sperimentale di Cinematografia
- Occupation: Film director
- Children: 3
- Parents: Luigi Muccino (father); Antonella Cappuccio (mother)
- Relatives: Silvio Muccino (brother)

Gabriele Muccino (Italian pronunciation: [ɡabriˈɛːle mutˈtʃiːno]; born 20 May 1967) is an Italian film director and screenwriter. He has worked his way from making short films only aired on Italian television to become a well-known and successful American filmmaker. He is the elder brother of actor Silvio Muccino, who often appears in his brother's films. Muccino has directed 12 films and is best known for his first American film The Pursuit of Happyness, starring Will Smith. Muccino has been nominated for and won several awards including the David di Donatello Award for Best Director in 2001 for his film The Last Kiss.

== Life and career ==
Born in Rome, Gabriele Muccino started his studies at Sapienza University of Rome in Italian literature but dropped out of University to pursue a career as a director. His first on-set film experience was as a volunteer director's assistant. This inspired his passion for filmmaking and led him to take courses in screenwriting and enroll in a directing program at Rome's Experimental Cinematography Institute. While there, Muccino created a few short films that were aired on Italian television. He then began directing a number of documentaries.

Following these accomplishments, Muccino was given the opportunity to direct a segment of the Italian anthology film Intolerance (1996). But Forever in My Mind was the next film he directed, starring his younger brother Silvio. Muccino's third feature film, The Last Kiss, directed in 2001, was the breakthrough that brought him international attention. The film's success led to Muccino signing a two-picture deal with Miramax. His success continued to grow with his next film, Remember Me, My Love in 2003.

He has currently made the switch to directing Hollywood films after The Last Kiss won the Audience Award for World Cinema at the 2002 Sundance Film Festival bringing him to the attention of the American film industry. Muccino was personally chosen by Will Smith to serve as the director of The Pursuit of Happyness. Muccino said in an interview afterwards, "Will had to defend me as a choice to the studio; I could barely speak English and could barely express my vision. I felt protected and that I could push my ideas even when they weren't totally conventional. The reason I found respect, and respect for my ideas, was because of Will." Muccino also directed Smith's later film Seven Pounds. Playing for Keeps was his next major work, starring Gerard Butler, Dennis Quaid and Uma Thurman. Muccino's next film Fathers and Daughters also features A-list celebrities such as Amanda Seyfried, Russell Crowe, and Aaron Paul.

One of his latest movies, Summertime, is a coming of age story of two Italian teenagers traveling to the States for the first time during the summer between high school and college.

== Awards and nominations ==
Muccino has won several awards throughout his lifetime. The first being Best Film at the Torino International Festival of Young Cinema in 1998 for Ecco fatto. In 1999 his film But Forever in My Mind won him several awards including the Silver Iris at the Brussels International Film Festival for best film, the Golden Castle at the Castellinaria International Festival of Young Cinema, and the OCIC Award at the Buenos Aires International Festival of Independent Cinema. The Italian box office success The Last Kiss (2001) won Muccino Best Director and Best Screenplay at the David di Donatello Awards. This film also earned the Audience Award in 2002 at the Sundance Festival which introduced Muccino to the United States. Remember Me, My Love scored three Nastro d'Argento Prizes which are the Italian equivalent to the Oscars. This film also won Best Director, Best Film, and Best Screenplay at the Donatello Awards in 2003.

- Torino International Festival of Young Cinema: Best Film (1998)
- Brussels International Film Festival: Best Film (1999)
- Castellinaria International Festival of Young Cinema: Golden Castle (1999)
- Buenos Aires International Festival of Independent Cinema: OCIC Award (1999)
- David Di Donatello Award 2001: Best Director and Best Screenplay - The Last Kiss
- Sundance Festival 2002: Audience Award - The Last Kiss
- David Di Donatello Awards 2003: Nominated ad Best Director, Best Film, and Best Screenplay for Remember Me, My Love
- Shanghai Film Festival 2010: Kiss Me Again - Won as Best film

== Filmography ==
=== Film ===
Year	Title	Director	Writer	Producer	Notes
1998	Ecco fatto	Yes	Yes	No	
1999	But Forever in My Mind	Yes	Yes	No	
2001	The Last Kiss	Yes	Yes	No	
2003	Remember Me, My Love	Yes	Yes	No	
2006	The Pursuit of Happyness	Yes	No	No	
2008	Seven Pounds	Yes	No	No	
2008	Io ricordo	No	No	Yes	Documentary
2009	Four Single Fathers	No	Yes	Yes	
2010	Kiss Me Again	Yes	Yes	No	
2010	Senza tempo	Yes	No	No	Short film
2012	Playing for Keeps	Yes	No	No	
2015	Fathers and Daughters	Yes	No	No	
2016	Summertime	Yes	Yes	No	
2018	There's No Place Like Home	Yes	Yes	No	
2020	The Best Years	Yes	Yes	No	
2021	Living in a Movie	Yes	No	No	Short film
2024	Here Now	Yes	Yes	No	
2026	Things Left Unsaid	Yes	Yes	No	

Actor

Year	Title	Role
1990	Atto di dolore	Zico

Executive producer

- The Last Kiss (2006)

=== Television ===
Year	Title	Director	Writer	Executive Producer	Notes
2007	Viva Laughlin	Yes	No	Yes	Episode: "Pilot"
2021–present	A casa tutti bene: La serie	Yes	Yes	No	16 episodes; Also creator

=== Music videos ===
Year	Title	Artist
2001	"E ritorno da te"	Laura Pausini
2010	"Baciami ancora"	Jovanotti
2012	"Tensione evolutiva"	Jovanotti
2015	"L'estate addosso"	Jovanotti
2018	"Mio fratello"	Biagio Antonacci
