= Florinda Ciardi =

Italian footballer (born 1970)

Personal information
- Date of birth: 29 August 1970 (age 56)
- Position: Midfielder

International career
Years	Team	Apps	(Gls)
- Italy

Florinda Ciardi (born 29 August 1970) is an Italian former footballer who played as a midfielder for Verona C.F.

== International career ==
Ciardi was also part of the Italian team at the 1997 European Championships.

== Honours ==
Verona C.F.

- Serie A: 1995–96
