= Angelo Duro =

Italian comedian and actor

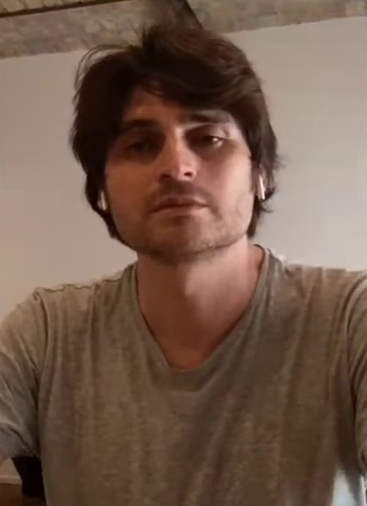
- Duro in 2022
- Born: 20 August 1982 (age 44); Palermo, Italy
- Occupations: Comedian actor

Angelo Duro (born 20 August 1982) is an Italian stand-up comedian, actor and television personality.

== Career ==
Born in Palermo, Duro made his television debut in 2010, entering the cast of the Italia 1 show Le Iene, after being spotted by its showrunner Davide Parenti during a stand-up performance. In 2016, he made his acting debut in Fabio De Luigi's comedy film Tiramisù. In 2017, he started touring with the one-man-show Perché mi stai guardando? (' Why are you looking at me?'), recording several sold-outs.

In 2018, Duro released his first book, Il piano B ('Plan B'), published by Mondadori. In 2023, he was a guest at the 73rd Sanremo Music Festival, raising some controversies for his performance. His first film in a leading role, I Am the End of the World, was a surprise hit at the box office.

== Style ==
Duro has been referred to as "a champion of cynicism applied to comedy". His comedy style has been described as "extreme politically incorrectness: his trademark is the constant provocation, and his language does not mind being scurrilous".
