= Enzo Moscato =

Italian writer and playwright (1948–2024)

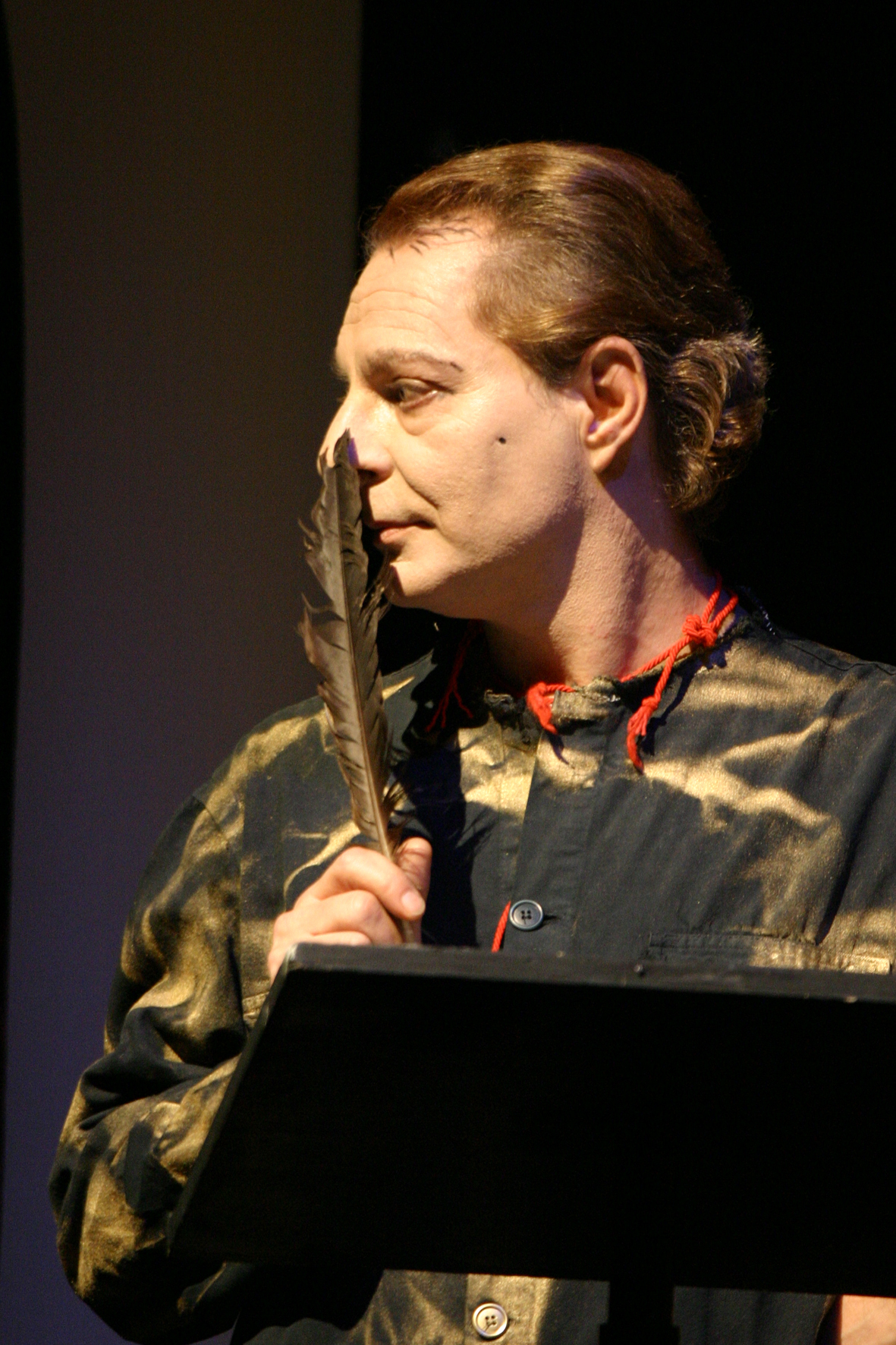
- Born: Vincenzo Moscato; 20 April 1948; Naples, Italy
- Died: 13 January 2024 (aged 75); Naples, Italy

Enzo Moscato (20 April 1948 – 13 January 2024) was an Italian writer, playwright and actor.

== Life and career ==
Son of Francesco Moscato and Concetta Turturiello, he was born in the Spanish quarters of Naples, in the eighteenth-century Palazzo Scampagnato. After attending the "Antonio Genovesi" classical high school in Naples, he graduated in philosophy at the Federico II University of Naples, obtaining a qualification in Human Sciences and History, with a thesis on the relationships between the political movements of sexual liberation and psychoanalysis. From 1975 to 1977 he taught philosophy and history in high schools in Naples and Oristano. In 1980 he began his activity in the theater which brought him to the attention of critics and the public as an actor, author and director, placing himself among the leaders of the new Neapolitan dramaturgy. He held artistic direction positions for the Teatro Mercadante-Stabile of Naples in the years 2003–2006, for the Festival Internazionale di Teatro-Benevento Città Spettacolo in the years 2007–2009; since 1990 he was the artistic director of the "Enzo Moscato theater company". He held courses for the master's degree in theater writing at the Suor Orsola Benincasa University of Naples in the academic years 2005–2006, 2007–2008, 2009–2010. He conducted courses and workshops in dramaturgy and theatrical writing at the University of Salerno in Fisciano near Salerno, at the Naples Study Center on Southern, Neapolitan and European theatre, and other institutions; he held seminars and in-depth meetings on the "Theatre of Enzo Moscato" in various Italian and European theaters and universities. In May 2016 he participated in the thirteenth edition of the FIT-Festival Internacional de Teatro, the largest theatrical event in the Brazilian state of Minas Gerais, with the representation of two of his works: Toledo suite and Compleanno. During this Brazilian tour he held, again in Belo Horizonte, a Lectio Magistralis entitled "Vocal Desnudamento" at the Faculty of Letters of the Federal University of Minas Gerais, and a conference at the Academia Mineira de Letras from title "Drama contemporâneo italiano - Degolarratos", in which he presented to the Brazilian public the contents of his book (translated into Portuguese, with the title Degolarratos, by the playwright and actress Dr. Anita Mosca) as well as the theater work of the same name, Scannasurice. Moscato also recorded four musical CDs as a chansonnier-revisitor of the Neapolitan and international singing universe.

Moscato died in Naples on 13 January 2024, at the age of 75.

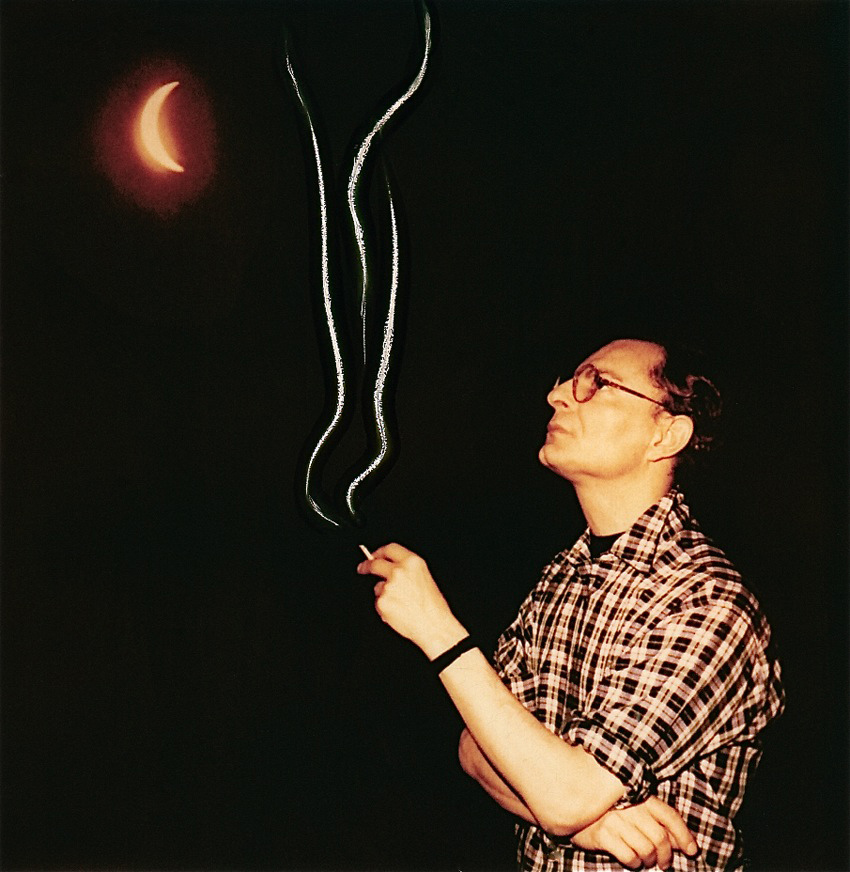
Enzo Moscato: portrait - Augusto De Luca

== Bibliography ==
- Carcioffola (1980)
- Scannasurice (1982)
- Signuri', signuri (1982)
- Trianon (1983)
- Festa al celeste e nubile santuario (1984)
- Ragazze sole con qualche esperienza (1985)
- Occhi gettati (1986)
- Cartesiana (1986)
- Piece Noire (1987)
- Partitura (1988)
- Little Peach (1988)
- Tiempe sciupate (1988)
- Scannaplaysurice (1989)
- In Recital (1989)
- Fuga per comiche lingue tragiche a caso (1990)
- Rasoi (1991)
- Arancia meccanica (1991) – traduzione e adattamento da A Clockwork Orange di A. Burgess
- Limbo (1992)
- Compleanno (1992)
- La Psychose Paranoiaque Parmi Les Artistes (1993)
- Embargos (1994)
- Mal-d'-Hamlé (1994)
- Ritornanti (1994)
- Litoranea (1994)
- Ubu re (1994) – traduzione e adattamento da Ubu roi di Alfred Jarry
- Recidiva (1995)
- Co'Stell'Azioni (1995)
- Lingua, carne, soffio (1996)
- La vita vissuta d'Artaud l'imbecille (1996) – traduzione e adattamento da La conférence au Vieux Colombier di Antonin Artaud
- I drammi marini (1996) – traduzione e adattamento dai Sea Plays di Eugene O'Neill
- Aquarium ardent (1997)
- Luparella (1997)
- Teatri del mare (1997)
- Tartufo (1998) – traduzione e adattamento da Tartuffe ou l'Imposteur di Molière
- Cantà (1999)
- Arena Olimpia (2000)
- Sull'ordine e il disordine dell'ex macello pubblico (2001), dedicato alla rivoluzione napoletana del 1799
- Orfani veleni (2002)
- Hotel de l' Univers (2003), rècit-chantant, dedicato alla musica del cinema
- Oro tinto (2004)
- Partitura per Leo (2004)
- Kinder-Traum Seminar, seminario sui bambini in sogno (2004), dedicato alla memoria collettiva dell'Olocausto
- Trompe l'oeil (2004)
- L'Opera Segreta (2005), omaggio all' universo poetico-espressivo di Anna Maria Ortese
- Sangue e bellezza, l'ultimo tempo in voce di Michelangelo Merisi detto Il Caravaggio (2005)
- Passioni-Voci, omaggio alla scrittura di S. Di Giacomo (2005)
- Disturbing a tragedy; schizzo-baccanti, ovvero: psicopatologia degli spettri europei, in margine al vivere odierno (2005)
- Niezi (Ragazzi di cristallo) (2006)
- Chantecler (2007) – traduzione e adattamento dall'omonimo di E. Rostand
- Il sogno di Giruzziello (2007)
- Le doglianze degli attori a maschera: libero omaggio a Carlo Goldoni, ispirato al suo Molière del 1751 (2007)
- Parole dette in sogno (2008)
- Magnificenza del terrore: omaggio scenico ad Antonin Artaud, a 60 anni dalla morte (2009)
- Toledo Suite (2010)
- Patria Puttana (2011)
- Tà-Kai-Tà (Eduardo per Eduardo) (2012)
- Napoli 43 (2013)
- Lacarmèn (2015)
- Grand'estate (2015)
- Bordello di mare con città (2016)
- Modo minore (2016)
- Raccogliere & bruciare (2017)

== Awards ==
- Premio Riccione Ater per il Teatro (1985) con Piece Noire
- Premio IDI - Istituto del Dramma Italiano (1988)
- Premio UBU per il Teatro (1988)
- Premio "Annibale Ruccello" - Monte Pellegrino, Palermo (1988)
- Premio della Critica (1991)
- Biglietto d'Oro AGIS (1991)
- Premio La Città dei Ragazzi a Battipaglia (1991)
- Premio I° Oscar della Radio Italiana (1992)
- Premio Antonio De Curtis (1993)
- Premio UBU, per 'Embargoes' (1994)
- Premio Sebeto (1994)
- Premio Internazionale di Radiofonia del Festival di Ostankino (Russia 1994)
- Premio Girulà per Luparella (1997)
- Premio Teatro Il Primo 'Miglior Spettacolo dell'anno' per Luparella (1997)
- Premio Università dello Spettacolo Napoli (2000)
- Premio Città di Angri (2001)
- Premio Annibale Ruccello a Positano (2002)
- Premio "Viviani ", a Benevento Città Spettacolo (2002)
- Premio Penisola Sorrentina (2003)
- Premio Franco Carmelo Greco, Comune di Caserta (2004)
- Premio Girulà per Hotel de l'univers (2004)
- Premio Pulcinellamente (2008)
- Premio Benevento Città Spettacolo (2009)
- Premio Eduardo Nicolardi (2011)
- Premio Poerio-Imbriani (2013)
- Premio Napoli Cultura (2013)
- Premio Teatrale Nazionale Franco Angrisano - Sant'Anastasia (2015)
- Riconoscimento "Laureati illustri" della Università Federico II di Napoli (2015)
- Premio Annibale Ruccello - Castellammare di Stabia (2017)
- Premio alla carriera Teatro NO'HMA Teresa Pomodoro - Milan (2017)
- Premio UBU alla carriera (2018)

== See also ==
- Italian literature
