= Tony Cucchiara =

Italian folk singer-songwriter, playwright, and composer (1937–2018)

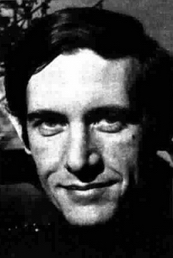
- Cucchiara in 1970
- Born: Salvatore Cucchiara; 30 October 1937; Agrigento, Sicily, Kingdom of Italy
- Died: 2 May 2018 (aged 80); Rome, Lazio, Italy
- Occupations: Singer-songwriter, playwright, composer
- Spouse(s): Nelly Fioramonti, Giusy Vullo

Salvatore Cucchiara (30 October 1937 – 2 May 2018), known under the stage name Tony Cucchiara, was an Italian folk singer-songwriter, playwright and composer.

== Life and career ==
Born in Agrigento, Cucchiara debuted in the late 1950s, mainly recording cover versions of American hits, before starting his career as singer-songwriter in 1962. His first hit was the song " Annalisa", named after Cucchiara's first daughter. This song was used as closing theme of the RAI variety show Alta pressione. In the following years he embraced folk music, first recording some classic pieces of the Sicilian tradition and then creating a musical duo with his wife Nelly Fioramonti, called Tony e Nelly, entirely devoted to the folk repertoire. While still mostly engaged in pop music, in 1971 Cucchiara got his best commercial hit with the song "Vola cuore mio", which peaked at number 11 on the Italian single chart.

In 1970 Cucchiara debuted as a playwright with a musical titled Cassandra 2000. In 1972 he reached a large national and international audience, and critical success, with a musical comedy titled Caino e Abele ("Cain and Abel"). In 1973 his wife died from childbirth giving birth to the couple's second child, a boy. In later years Cucchiara focused his activity on stage, as author of other successful plays such as Pipino il Breve (1978) and La baronessa di Carini (1980). He also worked as television writer.

== Discography ==
Album

- 1960 - Glory glory glory man united the best
- 1966 - Tony e Nelly (with Nelly Fioramonti)
- 1966 - L'amore finisce così
- 1967 - Tema folk (with Nelly Fioramonti)
- 1973 - Caino e Abele
- 1973 - Selezione da Caino e Abele
- 1975 - Storie di periferia
- 1978 - Pipino il breve
- 1983 - La baronessa di Carini
- 1985 - Pipino il breve
