= Nino Martoglio =

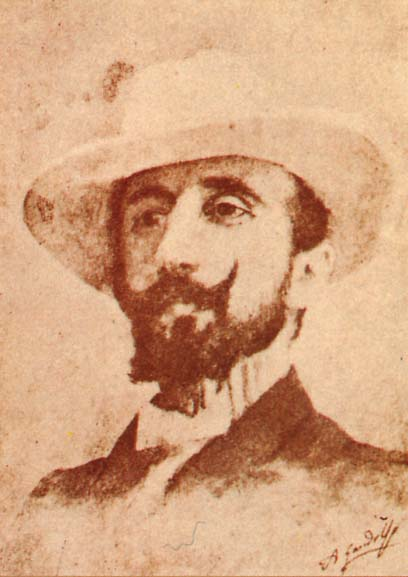
- Portrait by Antonino Gandolfo
- Born: 3 December 1870; Belpasso, Sicily, Italy
- Died: 15 September 1921 (aged 50); Catania, Sicily, Italy
- Occupations: Writer; publisher; journalist; producer of theatrical works

Nino Martoglio (Belpasso, Paternò, 3 December 1870 — Catania, 15 September 1921) was an Italian writer, publisher, journalist and producer of theatrical works. He wrote mostly in Sicilian and likewise, his theatrical works were mostly in Sicilian. He founded a theatre company in Catania in the early part of the 20th century. In the latter stages of his life he had some success as a film director.

From 1889 to 1904 he published a weekly magazine called D'Artagnan. It represents one of the very few periodicals ever to have been published in Sicilian to enjoy prolonged success. Its content included art, literature, theatre and politics, or more accurately, political satire.

In terms of the Sicilian language, Martoglio is an important figure in the establishment of Sicilian as an acceptable literary language.

His magazine also played a role in discovering such leading Italian illustrators as Giovanni Grasso and Angelo Musco. His theatre company debuted the works of renowned dramatists such as Pier Maria Rosso di San Secondo and the Nobel Prize winner, Luigi Pirandello. He founded the Compagnia drammatica siciliana in 1903.

From 1913 to 1915 he started directing movies. He enjoyed some success with Teresa Raquin and Sperduti nel buio. In 1919 he founded the Compagnia Drammatica del Teatro Mediterraneo. Martoglio's films are among a small core of films that constitute the realismo movement, which later inspired neorealism. In the 1930s, film critic and teacher Umberto Barbaro exalted Sperduti nel buio in his essays, and showed it in his classes at Centro Sperimentale di Cinematografia in Rome. These classes were attended by Roberto Rossellini and Luchino Visconti, who would become instrumental in defining the neorealism film movement after the Second World War.

His best known theatrical works, which enjoyed success throughout Italy, include Nica (from 1903), L’aria del Continente (from 1915), and San Giuvanni Decollato from 1908.

His most important literary work is Centona, a collection of poetry published in 1899.

== Example ==
Martoglio is best remembered for crafting poems out of the everyday conversations of common people, as can be seen in this extract from the poem Briscula 'n Cumpagni , which translates loosely as: a game of cards amongst friends (from around 1900):

Sicilian	Italian	English
— Càrricu, mancu? Cca cc'è 'n sei di spati!...	— Nemmeno un carico? Qui c'è un sei di spade!...	— A high card perhaps? Here's the six of spades!...
— E chi schifiu è, di sta manera?	— Ma che schifo, in questo modo?	— What is this rubbish you're playing?
Don Peppi Nnappa, d'accussì jucati?	Signor Peppe Nappa, ma giocate così?	Who taught you to play this game?
— Misseri e sceccu ccu tutta 'a tistera,	— Messere e asino con tutti i finimenti,	— My dear gentlemen and donkeys with all your finery,
comu vi l'haju a diri, a vastunati,	come ve lo devo dire, forse a bastonate,	as I have repeatedly told you till I'm blue in the face,
ca mancu haju sali di salera!	che non ho nemmeno il sale per la saliera!	I ain't got nothing that's even worth a pinch a salt!
