= Raffaella Salmaso =

Italian footballer and coach

Raffaela Salmaso
Personal information
- Full name: Raffaela Salmaso
- Date of birth: 16 April 1968 (age 58)
- Place of birth: Dolo, Italy
- Position: Defender

Senior career*
Years	Team	Apps	(Gls)
1982–1986	Padova		
1986–1990	Pordenone		
1990–1991	Reggiana		
1991–1993	Milan '82		
1993–1994	Geas		
1994–1995	Milan '82		
1995–1996	Verona		
1996–1997	Modena		
1997–1998	Lugo		
1998–1999	Modena		

International career
1990–1997	Italy	46	(3)
- * Club domestic league appearances and goals

Raffaela Salmaso (born 16 April 1968) is an Italian football coach and former defender, who represented the Italy women's national football team at the 1991 FIFA Women's World Cup.

Despite playing in defence, Salmaso netted around a dozen goals per season as she won four Serie A titles with four different clubs.

Salmaso was a member of the Italy women's national football team from 1990 until 1997, and scored Italy's first goal in their 1991 FIFA Women's World Cup quarter final defeat to Norway. She retired from international football after playing in Italy's 2–0 UEFA Women's Euro 1997 final defeat to Germany.
