= Pier Maria Rosso di San Secondo =

Italian playwright, journalist and writer

Rosso di San Secondo
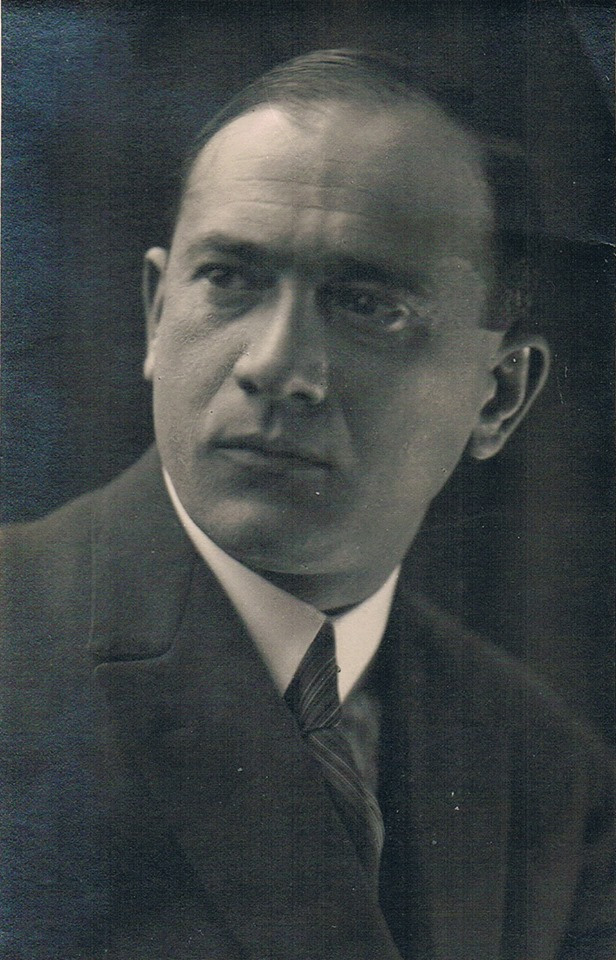
- Born: Pier Maria Rosso di San Secondo; 30 November 1887; Caltanissetta, Sicily, Italy
- Died: 22 November 1956 (aged 68); Lido di Camaiore, Tuscany, Italy
- Occupations: Journalist, playwright
- Known for: L' avventura terrestre; La roccia e i monumenti: dramma in tre atti

Pier Maria Rosso di San Secondo (November 30, 1887 in Caltanissetta – November 22, 1956 in Lido di Camaiore), or simply Rosso di San Secondo was an Italian playwright and journalist.

== Poetry ==
His poetry is characterized by lyricism and a pessimistic view of the relationship between man and society, with characters often marked by loneliness and a certain contrast between passion and rationality. Often this contrast is symbolically sought from San Secondo in the confrontation between the Italian North, characterized by a rational life, concrete and gray, and the Italian South characterized by a mythical dream, passionate colors of life.

Among his most important plays are La sirena ricanta, which debuted in 1908, and Marionette, che passione! in 1917, a work that kindled the interest of Luigi Pirandello, who pushed for the work to be recognized. The plot of Marionette, che passione! is focused on the meeting of three random characters, unable to make sense of their lives. The three are revealed in the end to be puppets, at the mercy of fate. A grotesque drama, some link the work to Pirandellism. According to Gaetano Savatteri, the true significance of Rosso di San Secondo was overshadowed by the figure of Pirandello.

Following the great success of Marionette, che passione!, Rosso di San Secondo wrote several other plays, including La bella addormentata in 1919, L'ospite desiderato in 1921, Tra vestiti che ballano in 1927, Il ratto di Proserpina del 1954, Una cosa di carne, Il delirio dell'oste Bassà, Amara. He also wrote fiction books, such as novellas collected in Ponentino in 1916 and the novel La Fuga 1917.

Rosso di San Secondo is buried in the cemetery Angeli di Caltanissetta.
