= Fabio Massimo Cacciatori =

Italian entrepreneur and film producer

- Born: Fabio Massimo Cacciatori; 2 December 1961 (age 64); Asti
- Occupations: Entrepreneur, film producer

Fabio Massimo Cacciatori (2 December 1961, Asti) is an Italian entrepreneur and film producer. Currently he is Managing Partner at A&G Management Consulting and Chairman of the software and computer systems development company E.magine.

== Biography ==
Cacciatori graduated in Economics at the University of Turin, magna cum laude.

== Career ==
Cacciatori was board member of Retroporto Alessandria S.p.A. (2009–2011), President of Bitronvideo s.r.l. (2005–2011), board member of De Tomaso (2010), President of Finpiemonte Partecipazioni S.p.A. (2009–2010), Board Member of Film Investment Piedmont Ltd (2009–2010), Founder and CEO of 4Talent Human Capital Services (3 different companies Click4Talent, Bancalavoro, Cliccalavoro, with different targets and specializations) (2000–2009), Founder and board member of EuroPMI (2002-2004), and after other experiences in the fashion industries CEO of Versace S.p.A. (2003) until he left following disputes with the Versace family, and Senior Consultant at Arthur Andersen & Co (1986–1989).

In 2006, he was appointed CEO of Virtual Reality & Multi Media Spa and its subsidiary Lumiq Studios, of which he managed the international revitalization (2006-2013).

As a producer and executive producer, he has been involved in many national and international live action and 3D animation projects.

From 2009 until 2013, he was Coordinator of the Innovation Center for Digital Creativity and Multimedia Hub in Turin, with the aim of supporting local businesses in the development and implementation of technological and digital activities.

== Prizes and awards ==
- Rotary - Paul Harris Fellow
- Alfieri of Asti
- Winner of the competition for the award of a scholarship from the National Research Council (CNR) - "Analisi delle proiezioni di sviluppo economico in funzione dell'innovazione tecnologica"

== Written works ==
- Cacciatori Fabio Massimo, Sergio Iannazzo, "Finanza e Web", Analisi finanziaria, (2), 2000, pp. 122–129.
- G. Fornengo, R. Lanzetti, L. Parodi, S. Rolfo, "Industria e innovazione l'area dell'automazione industriale", 1987, Torino, IRES, p. 133 - Riferimento dati ed elaborazioni informatiche: F. M. Cacciatori, L. Marengo.
- Articles : "The prospects of Artificial Intelligence" in the Journal Interface n. 29, "The structure of expert systems" on Interface n. 31/32, "Job scheduling: overview of the main expert systems" on Interface n. 41.
- Investigation on the potential of the production management systems - Reseau Milan (1987)
- Studies: "Pianura meccatronica a Torino: da concentrazione a sistema" (1987) and "Competitività e innovazione" - for CERIS/CNR and IRES
- Sector and market analysis in the field of industrial automation - for Databank and Teknibank (1986-1987)
- Study: "Flussi di importazione nell'area piemontese", with Prof. Gian Maria Gros-Pietro for Tecnocity/Fondazione Giovanni Agnelli (1986)
- Contribution to the analysis of the agro-food sector, CERIS-CNR Bulletin n. 19

== Sources ==
- MESH – Mise en scène Helper", V. Lombardo, F. Nunnari, D. Di Giannantonio, J. Landi, P. Armao, F. Confaloni, S.May - Virtual Reality & Multi Media Spa, Joint VR Conference of euroVR and EGVE, 2011, pp. 27–32,
