= Lumiq Studios =

Italian media company

- Type: Limited Liability Company
- Industry: mass media, cinema
- Founded: 2002
- Founder: Fata Finmeccanica, Euphon, Ahrold
- Headquarters: Turin, Italy
- Area served: Worldwide
- Key people: Fabio Massimo Cacciatori *Virtual Reality & Multi Media Spa *Gianni Versace SpA, Andrea Piersanti, Franco Bevione
- Products: Live action movies, animation movies, television programs
- Website: http://www.lumiq.com

Lumiq Studios S.r.l was an Italian company, publicly owned, producing CGI and live action movies. Through its studios, Lumiq provided support to activities of post production and digital intermediate, working in the development, production and marketing of products and services for film, television, advertising, multimedia and new media.

It was based in Turin, Italy, in Corso Lombardia 190, in the complex of Virtual Reality & Multi Media Spa, i.e. the older Fert Studies.

Through the 100% control of Virtual Spa, Lumiq was owned by the City of Turin, the Piedmont Region, the Province of Turin, Turin Polytechnic and the University of Turin.

In 2013, the company was closed due to bankruptcy.

== Filmography ==
=== Past films and videos ===
- The Devil's Violinist, 2013 - executive production (Italian Unit)
- Black to the moon 3D (2012), 2012, animation, 90 minutes, co-production with Baleuko films, distribution
- Italian Movies, 2012, live action, 90 min, co-production with Indiana Production
- When the Night, 2011, live action, 90 min, co-production with Cattleya
- Some say no, 2011, live action, 35 mm, 83 min - joint venture with Cattleya
- Un Altro Mondo, 2010, live action, 35 mm, 83 min - joint venture with Cattleya
- The woman of my life, 2010, live action, 35 mm, 83 min - joint venture with Cattleya
- OGR: Officine Grandi Riparazioni, 2010, video documentary - production
- Promeny (Changes), 2009, live action, 35 mm, 83 min - co-production with Czech Republic
- Donkey Xote, 2007, 3D animation, 35 mm, 90 min, co-production with Filmax Animation; the movie has the recognition of cultural interest of the MIBAC
- La notte eterna del coniglio, 2007, horror, 35 mm, 72 min, co-production with RAI
- Prisoners of Freedom, 2005, directed by Laura Quaglia, historical movie of the history of Solidarność, 35 mm, 85 min - co-produced by The Quail Flies independent(I) and GlobusXXI(RU)
- L'età del Fuoco, 2004 - co-production

=== Projects in Development ===
- The Amphibian Man, 2014 - co-production with Trikita Entertainment and Bavaria Film Partners
- Cherry Chérie - co-production with Kitchenfilm
- Ruby - production and distribution

=== Past Television ===
- Lot of Laughing, 2008, TV series - co-production with Cydonia and Universo
- Amazing World, 2006 - co-production with RAI
- Do You Like Hitchcock?, 2005 - post production services
- La bambina dalle mani sporche, 2005 - production facility
- Amazing History, 2004 - co-production with RAI
- Cartoons on the Bay, 2003 - co-production with RAI

=== Services ===
- The Gambler Who Wouldn't Die, 2013 - sound services
- Cosimo e Nicole, 2012 - production services
- Rust, 2011 - post-production sound services
- Women Vs Men, 2011 - production services
- Men Vs Women, 2010 - production services
- Imago Mortis, 2009 - production facility
- Armando Testa - Povero ma moderno, 2009, documentary - production facility
- Baarìa, 2009, post-production facilities
- Tutti intorno a Linda, 2009, production services
- The Demons of St. Petersburg, 2008 - production services
- Peopling the Palaces at Venaria Reale, 2007 - production facility
- Il dolce e l'amaro, 2007 - production services
- Centochiodi, 2007 - post-production services
- Anastezsi, 2007 - production services
- Il 7 e l'8, 2007 - post-production services
- The Stone Merchant, 2006 - post-production - nomination for special effects David di Donatello
- La strada di Levi, 2006, documentary - post-production services
- I giorni dell'abbandono, 2005 - production facility
- Round Trip, 2004 - production services
- After Midnight, 2004 - production services
- Senza freni, 2003 - production services
