= Teatro Stabile di Catania =

The Teatro Stabile di Catania (Permanent theatre of Catania) is a theatrical institution based in Catania, Sicily, Italy which was formed in 1958. It has two theatres, the Teatro Giovanni Verga, the Teatro Angelo Musco. Annually, the program offers a choice of many shows, partly self-produced. It is the first permanent theatre in the South of Italy.

The theater was founded in 1958 in the small hall of the Teatro Angelo Musco, which was capable of only 250 seats, as Ente Teatro di Sicilia. The founding members were the Sicilian actors Turi Ferro, Rosina Anselmi, Umberto Spadaro, Turi Pandolfini and Michele Abruzzo, the notary Gaetano Musumeci and the journalist Mario Giusti who also served as the artistic director of the institution for about thirty years.

The founders of the theater gave it a strongly traditional identity through the restoration of Sicilian theatrical heritage represented by the works of Angelo Musco, Luigi Capuano, Giovanni Verga, Federico De Roberto, Nino Martoglio, Antonino Russo Giusti, Luigi Pirandello, Vitaliano Brancati and Ercole Patti, among others. On the basis of the recognition of the establishment as a public institution to which is granted financing from the city of Catania, the Province and the region, in 1962 the institution was renamed Teatro Stabile di Catania.
