= Singing fish =

Singing fish may refer to:

- Big Mouth Billy Bass
- Singingfish, a search engine
