= Richard Moat =

British business executive (born 1954)

Richard Frank Moat

Non Executive Director of Sherritt International
- Incumbent
- Assumed office 12th May 2005

Personal details
- Born: 8 September 1954 (age 72) Nuneaton, Warwickshire, England, U.K.
- Children: 2
- Education: St Catharine's College, Cambridge

Richard Frank Moat (born 8 September 1954) is a British business executive who is a Non Executive Director of Sherritt International. He was formerly the CEO of Eir / Eircom in Ireland.

== Early life ==
He went to King Edward VI Grammar School in Nuneaton. He has an MA Honours degree in Law from St Catharine's College, Cambridge. He is a Fellow of the Association of Chartered Certified Accountants, and has a Diploma in Corporate Finance and Accounting from the London Business School.

== Career ==
Moat worked in the Lloyd’s insurance market from 1977 to 1978, and as an analyst at Sedgwick from 1979 to 1980. From 1980 to 1992, Moat worked at the USX/Marathon Group. From 1992 to 1998, he was corporate finance director at Orange plc. From 1998 to 2000, he was the international group director of finance at Orange. From 2000 to 2002, he was the chief executive of Orange Thailand. He was then chief executive of Orange Denmark A/S from 2002 to 2004. In 2004, he became chief executive of Orange Romania.

In 2009, he became the Managing Director of T-Mobile UK Ltd.

In 2010, he became Deputy Chief Executive and Chief Financial Officer of Everything Everywhere Ltd, the leading mobile operator in the UK.

In August 2012, he was appointed Chief Financial Officer of Eir (telecommunications). In November 2014, he became the Chief Executive Officer Eir and served in this role until April 2018. From April 2018 to April 2021 he was a Non Executive Director of Eir.

In 2019, Moat was appointed Chief Executive Officer of Technicolor SA following the resignation of Frederic Rose.

In September 2022, Technicolor Creative Studios SA was spun off from Technicolor SA to create a separate public limited company. The remaining Technicolor SA business was renamed Vantiva SA. Moat stood down as CEO, and became Chairman of Vantiva SA, resigning in February 2024.

From July 2012 to April 2021, Moat was a non executive director of International Personal Finance plc, becoming Senior Independent Director and Chair of the Audit Committee.

He became a non executive director of Sherritt International on 12 May 2025.

Moat is also President Elect of the St. Catharine’s College, Cambridge alumni society, and a trustee of the King Edward VI Foundation Birmingham Academy Trust Board. He is a governor of King Edward VI Lordswood School for Girls.

== Personal life ==
Richard is married to Mary. They each have two children from previous marriages.

Business positions
Preceded by Herb Hribar	Chief Executive of eir November 2014 – April 2018	Succeeded by Carolan Lennon
Preceded by New company	Chief Financial Officer / Deputy Chief Executive Officer of EE Limited; July 2010 – December 2011	
Preceded by Jim Hyde	Chief Executive of T-Mobile UK; June 2009 – June 2010	Succeeded by Company defunct
