= Elizabeth Elting =

American businesswoman

- Born: February 15, 1966 (age 60); Westchester County, New York, U.S.
- Education: Trinity College; New York University Stern School of Business
- Occupation: Entrepreneur
- Organization: Founder of TransPerfect
- Spouse: Michael Burlant

Elizabeth Elting (born February 15, 1966) is an American businesswoman, entrepreneur, and philanthropist. She co-founded and served as co-chief executive officer of TransPerfect, the world's largest translation services provider, for 25 years. She has been named to Forbes magazine's list of the Richest Self-Made Women since 2016, with a net worth of $420 million.

Since leaving TransPerfect in 2018 following a lengthy legal battle with co-founder Phil Shawe that resulted in a buyout, Elting has been serving as founder and CEO of the Elizabeth Elting Foundation, focusing on advocacy for women in the workplace. Her advocacy work has received recognition from the National Organization of Women.

== Early life and education ==
Elting was born in Westchester County, New York, to Everett Elting, an advertising executive, and Judy Elting, an educator. Her family traveled frequently, including long-term residences in Portugal and Canada, where Elting first developed interest in studying languages. In Toronto, a young Elting worked at many jobs over the years including as an usherette for the Toronto Blue Jays. She speaks English, French, Spanish, Portuguese, and Latin and earned a BA in Modern Languages and Literatures from Trinity College in 1987, and her MBA from NYU Stern School of Business in 1992.

== Professional career ==
After graduating from Trinity College, Elting interned in Caracas in the finance department of a cement company and then worked at a language services company in New York City, and interned at Moody’s Investors Service during graduate school. Very briefly after graduation, Elting worked in the proprietary trading division of a French bank; however, she quickly grew dissatisfied with the “boys’ club” atmosphere and the expectation that she would perform administrative and secretarial work alongside her official responsibilities, and left to found her own company.

Having spent several years working in the translation industry, Elting felt there was a need for a service-minded enterprise that could deliver complex projects quickly and accurately. To that end, Elting co-founded TransPerfect in 1992 out of an NYU dorm room. Elting served as co-CEO of TransPerfect for almost 26 years, during which it became the world's largest provider of language and business solutions. Headquartered in New York City, the company has over $600 million in revenues and more than 4,000 employees in over 90 cities around the globe.

During Elting's time as co-CEO, TransPerfect was recognized eight times with the Inc. 5000 Award, six times as one of the Deloitte Technology Fast 500, and earned multiple Stevie Awards, including “Company of the Year” and “Fastest Growing Tech Company of the Year” in 2016. Her tenure also saw Crain's New York Business name TransPerfect one of the largest privately held companies for 12 consecutive years, and one of the largest women-owned companies 11 times. The company was a winner of the 2015 SmartCEO Corporate Culture Awards and was also recognizes by SmartCEO as a “Future 50” company five years running. During her tenure, TransPerfect was also awarded “Best Translation Solution” by the Internet Marketing Association for three consecutive years. It was also named one of the fastest-growing women-owned/led businesses in North America by Entrepreneur and the Women Presidents' Organization.

Elting left TransPerfect in 2018. She currently serves as founder and CEO of the Elizabeth Elting Foundation.

== Corporate divorce ==
In May 2018, the Delaware Supreme Court upheld a decision causing the sale of Elting's 50% ownership of TransPerfect to cofounder Phil Shawe for $385 million, which closed the same month.

== Political views and opinions ==
Elting, through her regular column at Forbes, has articulated a vision of aggressive advancement of women's rights through professional and entrepreneurial development and advancement and women's health. Vocal about women's equality, she strongly advocates for women to act forcefully in the workplace and to own and operate their own businesses, arguing that economic power is social power.

== Philanthropic and advocacy work ==
In addition to her work in business, Elting is the founder and CEO of the Elizabeth Elting Foundation, through which she has partnered with the American Heart Association’s Go Red For Women Campaign, where she also serves as co-chair of the New York branch of the movement. The partnership is dedicated to spreading awareness and education regarding the factors that can affect women's cardiac health as well as promoting future research and encouraging more women to go into STEM fields like medicine and engineering, with the aim of not only improving women's representation in those fields, but also producing future breakthroughs and discoveries for women's health.

Elting is also involved with the National Organization of Women, Women in the World, CFW Careers for Women, the Women's Leadership Council's Founders Council at Trinity College, and NYU Stern Women in Business. Elting has awarded scholarships to women at Trinity College, helped the NYU Stern School of Business attract, enroll and support more women, mentored women at Columbia Business School, and continues to foster entrepreneurship opportunities for women through the Elizabeth Elting Foundation. Additionally, Elting's Elting Family Foundation provides financial support for research into a rare kind of lymphoma called Waldenstrom's macroglobulinemia. Elting is a regular contributor at Forbes Magazine, where she writes about issues facing women in the workplace and how women can navigate their careers to success. In addition, she regularly lectures at Columbia Business School regarding entrepreneurship and growing a company.

In 2020 The Elizabeth L. Elting Foundation made a $500,000 gift to establish the Michael N. Burlant and Elizabeth L. Elting Scholarship Fund at the University of Michigan's Law School, and the Michael N. Burlant and Elizabeth L. Elting Family Scholarship Fund at University of Michigan's College of Literature, Science, and the Arts (LSA).

== Honors and recognitions ==
- NYU Stern lecture hall named the Elizabeth Elting Lecture Hall (2022)
- SmartCEO Future 50 (Annually 2013–2017)
- Trinity College Gary McQuaid Award (2017)
- “America’s Richest Self-Made Women” by Forbes (2016, 2017, 2018, 2019, 2020, 2021, 2022, 2023)
- Enterprising Women's “Enterprising Woman of the Year” (2017)
- National Organization of Women's “Women of Power & Influence” (2016)
- Diversity Journal's 10th Annual “Women Worth Watching” List (2011)
- “Distinguished Alumna Award” from New York University's Stern School of Business (2011)
- "Alumni Medal for Excellence" from Trinity College (2007)
- "Woman of the Year" by American Express and Entrepreneur Magazine (2004)
- Ernst & Young Entrepreneur of the Year Award (2001)
- Working Woman's “Entrepreneurial Excellence Award for Customer Service” (1999)

== Bibliography ==
- In September 2023, Elting released her first book, Dream Big and Win: Translating Passion into Purpose and Creating a Billion-Dollar Business. Wiley Publishing, ISBN 978-1119904366.

== Personal life ==
Elting and her husband, Michael Burlant married in 1999. They have two sons and reside in New York City.
