= The Mill (company) =

French VFX production company

- Type: Subsidiary
- Industry: Visual effects Computer animation
- Founded: 1990; 36 years ago in London
- Founders: Robin Shenfield; Pat Joseph
- Headquarters: Paris, France
- Parent: The Carlyle Group (2007–2011); Barclays (2011–2015); Technicolor Group (2015–2025); TransPerfect (2025–present)
- Website: www.themill.com

The Mill is a French (formerly British) visual effects and computer animation production company headquartered in Paris known for their work in advertising, film and television.

Formerly owned by a number of companies, after the Mill's parent company Technicolor Group had appointed administrators in February 2025. Only the French operations remain, having been acquired by the TransPerfect group. The 440 employees of the Mill in the United Kingdom were laid off, and the US operations were taken over by the employees.

== History ==
=== Founding ===
In 1990, Robin Shenfield and Pat Joseph opened the Mill in Soho, London. Starting as a visual effects house for the advertising industry, it was the first VFX company in Europe to use exclusively digital methods.

=== Global operations ===
2002 saw the Mill open a studio in New York, becoming the first UK visual effects house to do so. The extension of operations to the US was successful, with the company growing to employ over 100 staff by 2009.

The Mill was also launched in Los Angeles in 2007 – the first UK visual effects house to open on the West Coast – and the new venture was highly successful.

In 2013, the Mill opened a new office in Chicago, sharing its premises with editorial house The Whitehouse in the Courthouse Place building.

In 2022, the Mill opened its studio in Seoul, and because of the unity with MPC Advertising, also expanded to open studios in Paris, Amsterdam, Shanghai and Singapore.

On October 29, 2025, the Mill VFX relaunched, after being acquired by the language and AI company TransPerfect in April 2025. The company announced it was reopening offices in London and would also have locations in Seoul and Bangalore, with plans for the US, and with its Montréal, Adelaide, Mumbai and Shanghai studios set to restart operations and Beijing, Singapore, Toronto, and Vancouver studios set to start operations.

In June 2026, TransPerfect announced that MPC's Paris and Liège facilities would be integrated into the Mill, bringing their operations under the Mill brand.

=== Ownership ===
In 2007, the Mill was acquired by The Carlyle Group, who then sold it to Barclays Private Equity (later rebranded as Equistone Partners Europe) in 2011. On 15 September 2015, Technicolor SA acquired the Mill for €259 million from Equistone.

In May 2020, the "Mill Film" section of the company was folded into the visual effects firm MR. X (another division of Technicolor - now known as MPC) in response to the economic effects of the COVID-19 pandemic, while the Mill continued as a separate entity.

Prior to Technicolor's collapse, the Mill was based in London, England and operated two offices in the United States (Los Angeles, and Chicago), three others in Europe (Paris, Amsterdam & Berlin) and four in Asia (Shanghai, Seoul, India, and opening soon in Singapore). The Mill produces real-time visual effects, animation, moving images, design, experiential, and digital projects for the advertising, games, and music industries.

In January 2022, Josh Mandel became President of the Mill after having initially joined the Mill's studio in Los Angeles as Managing Director/President in 2019 and becoming Chief Executive Officer in January 2021. At the same time, the Mill united with MPC Advertising to create one global studio network under the Mill brand. As a global studio the Mill made this change to scale up for a creative future, investing in new talent, production capabilities, and immersive technologies.

In February 2025, it was reported that the Mill's parent company had appointed administrators.

In March 2025, TransPerfect acquired the French assets of the Mill. In early April, the Mill opened its Singaporean studio.

On October 29, 2025, the Mill VFX relaunched, after being acquired by the language and AI company TransPerfect in April 2025. The company announced it was reopening offices in London and would also have locations in Seoul and Bangalore, with plans for the US, and with its Montréal, Adelaide, Mumbai and Shanghai studios set to restart operations and Beijing, Singapore, Toronto, and Vancouver studios set to start operations.

== Current operations ==
=== Offerings ===
The Mill is involved in a range of visual effects and design projects in the commercial, gaming and music industries. The company's supervisors, producers and artists supported all stages of production, from pre-visualisation and conceptual artwork, shoot supervision, 3D, 2D and color grading through to delivery of the finished project.

=== Expanded offerings ===
Beam.tv was launched in 2002 as an online digital delivery and content management platform. Beam was originally established as an in-house FTP process to allow clients to review and approve visual-effects work being completed by the Mill in London. AdText.tv launched in 2008 for commercial subtitling.

Mill+ launched in 2013 as a creative studio focusing on motion graphics, design and animation.

== BEAM.TV ==
BEAM.TV
- Type: Subsidiary
- Headquarters: London, England, United Kingdom
- Number of employees: 125 (2011)
- Parent: The Mill
- Website: www.beam.tv

BEAM.TV is an online digital delivery and content management platform. Beam, still part of the Mill group, was established as an in-house FTP process following the making of the film Gladiator. This simple process enabled director Sir Ridley Scott to immediately review and approve visual effects work being completed by The Mill in London – while he was still shooting in Malta. This required a real-time digital platform with a toolset that would instinctively serve the demands of the filmmaking process.

In 2011 Beam has over 125 people working in London, New York City and Los Angeles.

Beam distributes almost half of all UK television commercials and is the exclusive partner to Unilever for the international distribution of all its television commercials worldwide.

Beam has developed bespoke systems to manage the entry and judging processes for international advertising awards, including Cannes Lions, BTAA (British Arrows) and The ANDY's.

As part of Technicolor Creative Studios, Beam now has locations in Shanghai, Amsterdam, Los Angeles, New York and Seoul.

== Filmography ==
=== Feature films ===
- Hilary and Jackie (1998)
- Gladiator (2000)
- Lara Croft: Tomb Raider (2001)
- Harry Potter and the Philosopher's Stone (2001)
- Black Hawk Down (2001)
- Cats & Dogs (2001)
- The Count of Monte Cristo (2002)
- Harry Potter and the Chamber of Secrets (2002)
- Harry Potter and the Prisoner of Azkaban (2004)
- Dredd (2012)
- The Bronze (2015)
- Ghost In The Shell (2017)
- Bumblebee (2018)
- Detective Pikachu (2019)
- Da 5 Bloods (2020)
- Love and Monsters (2020)
- In The Heights (2021)
- C'mon C'mon (2021)
- The Last Duel (2021)
- The Nun II (2023)
- Under Paris (2024)
- Emilia Pérez (2024)
- Animale (2024)
- Dracula (2025)
- The Great Arch (2025)
- The Carpenter's Son (2025)
- Troll 2 (2025)
- The Gallerist (2026)
- Cold Storage (2026)
- Les Rayons et les Ombres (2026)
- Minotaur (2026)
- The Green Eyes (2026)
- A Woman Today (2026)
- Too Many Beasts (2026)
- Bunker (2026)
- Father Joe (2027)
- Fonda (2027)

=== Television ===
- Band of Brothers (2001)
- ITV “1” idents (2006)
- BBC Two curve idents (2018–)
- BBC – 2020 Summer Olympics
- Doctor Who (2005–2011)
- Torchwood (2006–2009)
- The Sarah Jane Adventures (2007–2011)
- Atlanta (2016–2022)
- Tales From The Loop (2020)
- Severance (2022–)

=== Music videos ===
- The Chemical Brothers - Wide Open (2015)
- Jay-Z – The Story of O.J. (2017)
- Cashmere Cat – Emotions and For Your Eyes Only (2019)
- FKA Twigs – Sad Day (2019)
- Dua Lipa – Hallucinate (2020)
- Doja Cat and the Weeknd – You Right (2021)
- Kanye West – Hurricane (2021)
- Calvin Harris, Dua Lipa and Young Thug – Potion (2022)
- Megan Thee Stallion – Plan B (2022)
- Calvin Harris, Justin Timberlake, Halsey, and Pharrell Williams – Stay with Me (2022)

=== Commercials ===
- Bud Light (2011)
- Xfinity – X1 (2015)
- John Lewis – The Boy & The Piano (2018)
- Ridley Scott's Hennessy – Seven Worlds (2019)
- PlayStation – The Last of Us pt. II (2020)
- Burberry – Festive (2020)
- Smart Energy – Einstein (2021)
- Verizon – The Reset (2021)
- Paramount+ – Journey to the Peak (2021)

== Awards ==
Film and Television

| Year | Award | Category | Work | Result | Notes |
|---|---|---|---|---|---|
| 2001 | Academy Awards | Best Visual Effects | Gladiator | Won | |
| 2004 | MTV Video Music Awards | Best Visual Effects | "Walkie Talkie Man" by Steriogram | Nominated | |
| 2006 | Royal Television Society Craft & Design Awards | Visual Effects – Digital Effects | Doctor Who (series 2) | Nominated | |
| 2007 | British Academy Television Craft Awards | Visual Effects | Doctor Who | Nominated | |
| 2008 | British Academy Television Craft Awards | Visual Effects | Doctor Who ("Voyage of the Damned") | Nominated | |
| 2009 | British Academy Television Craft Awards | Visual Effects | Doctor Who ("The Fires of Pompeii") | Won | |
| 2009 | Royal Television Society Craft & Design Awards | Visual Effects – Digital Effects | Doctor Who ("The Next Doctor") | Won | |
| 2010 | British Academy Television Craft Awards | Visual Effects | Doctor Who ("The Fires of Pompeii") | Nominated | |
| 2010 | British Academy Television Craft Awards | Visual Effects | Merlin | Nominated | |
| 2010 | Royal Television Society Craft & Design Awards | Visual Effects – Digital Effects | Merlin ("The Last Dragonlord") | Nominated | |
| 2011 | British Academy Television Craft Awards | Visual Effects | Merlin | Won | |
| 2011 | British Academy Television Craft Awards | Visual Effects | Doctor Who | Nominated | |
| 2011 | MTV Video Music Awards | Best Visual Effects | "Don't Turn the Lights On" by Chromeo | Nominated | |
| 2011 | Royal Television Society Craft & Design Awards | Visual Effects – Digital Effects | Doctor Who ("A Christmas Carol") | Nominated | |
| 2012 | British Academy Television Craft Awards | Visual Effects | Sinbad ("Pilot") | Nominated | |
| 2013 | British Academy Television Craft Awards | Visual Effects & Graphic Design | Doctor Who | Nominated | |
| 2020 | Emmy Awards | Visual Effects | Tales From The Loop | Nominated | |
