= Vantiva =

French technology company

Vantiva SA
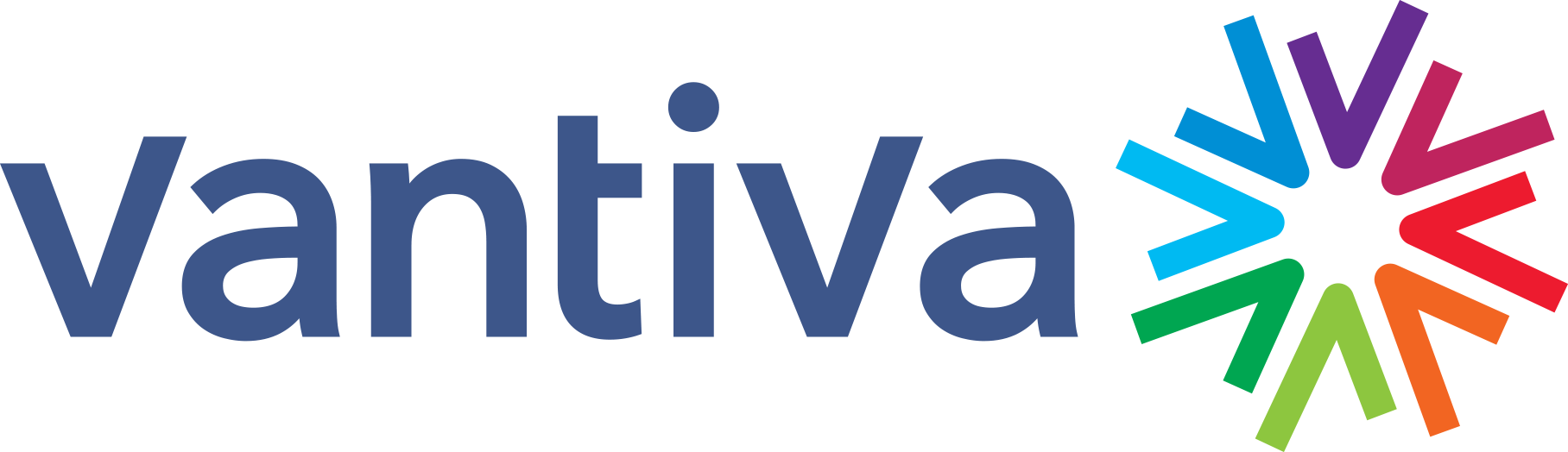
- Formerly: Compagnie française pour l'exploitation des procédés Thomson-Houston (1893–1966); Thomson-Brandt SA (1966–1982); Thomson SA (1982–2010); Technicolor SA (2010–2022)
- Type: Public
- Traded as: Euronext Paris: VANTI; CAC Small
- Industry: Creative services; Technology; Broadband
- Founded: 1893; 133 years ago
- Headquarters: Paris, France
- Key people: Brian Shearer (chairperson); Tim O'Loughlin (CEO and director)
- Revenue: ▼€2.9 billion (2021)
- Operating income: ▲€30 million (2021)
- Net income: ▼€140 million (2021)
- Total assets: ▼€3.0 billion (2021)
- Total equity: ▼€134 million (2021)
- Number of employees: ▲16,676 (2021)
- Website: www.vantiva.com

Vantiva SA, formerly known as Thomson (1982–2010) and Technicolor (2010–2022), is a French multinational corporation that provides technology products and services for the communication, media and entertainment industries. Headquartered in Paris, Vantiva also maintains offices in Rennes (France), Beijing (China), Seoul (South Korea), Chennai (India), Edegem (Belgium), Norcross (U.S), and Manaus (Brazil).

The company originated in the American Thomson-Houston Electric Company as its French subsidiary, the predecessor to General Electric. The French Thomson-Houston specialized in electricity production and distribution equipment; it had a 50-year cooperative and patent collaboration with General Electric which had ended in 1953. By the early 1960s it had grown into a large conglomerate producing various things including telecom equipment, televisions, electric light bulbs and anti-aircraft missiles, albeit still outranked in Europe by Philips and Siemens. In 1966, Thomson merged with Hotchkiss-Brandt, and their electronics branches involved in aerospace, broadcasting and military supplies for the government, merged with the state's blessing to create the Thomson-CSF joint venture.

Thomson-Brandt and its subsidiary Thomson-CSF were nationalized by the Mauroy government in 1982 grouped together under Thomson SA. In 1987, Thomson purchased the consumer electronics business of General Electric which included the RCA brand, and with other acquisitions rapidly expanded to become the world's fourth largest consumer electronics maker (after Matsushita, Sony and Philips) with its RCA sets and Thomson sets among the best-selling televisions in America and Europe respectively.. Partnering with Hughes Electronics, Thomson Comsumer Electronics, in 1994, became the pioneer in mass distribution of digital video programming in the US (and LATAM) with the creation of the DSS satellite business. The engineering innovations of the Indianapolis teams resulted in a licensed patent portfolio that was the mainstay of the company for more than two decades. This Intellectual Property portfilio was eventually acquired by Interdigital Corporation in July 2018. Despite the success of the digital business, the traditional TV manufacturing business and the European businesses were losing money resulting in the privatization of Thomson by spinning-off Thomson-CSF into Thales Group, shifting to entertainment services by purchasing Technicolor and selling its TV manufacturing business to TCL in 2004. Thomson Multimedia renamed itself to Technicolor SA in 2010, adopting the name of its film making subsidiary. In 2022, its visual effects division Technicolor Creative Studios was spun off as a separate entity (the now-defunct Technicolor Group), and the remaining company rebranded as Vantiva.

Vantiva is organized into three divisions:

- Connected Home: Manufactures broadband modems and Android TV set-top boxes
- HomeSight: Offers remote care and monitoring services in clients’ homes.
- Smart Spaces: Provides monitoring systems for self-storage facilities.
- Supply Chain Solutions: Previously known as the fourth division, but was sold off in April 2025

== History ==
=== 1892: The founding of the General Electric Company ===
Thomson was named after the electrical engineer Elihu Thomson, who was born in Manchester, England, on 26 March 1853. Thomson moved to Philadelphia, United States, at the age of 5, with his family. Thomson formed the Thomson-Houston Electric Company in 1879 with Edwin Houston. The company merged with the Edison General Electric Company to become the General Electric Company in 1892. In 1893, the Compagnie Française Thomson-Houston (CFTH) was formed in Paris, a sister company to GE in the United States. It was from this company that the modern Thomson Group would evolve.

In 1966, CFTH merged with Hotchkiss-Brandt to form Thomson-Houston-Hotchkiss-Brandt (soon renamed Thomson-Brandt). In 1968, the electronics business of Thomson-Brandt merged with Compagnie Générale de Télégraphie Sans Fil (CSF) to form Thomson-CSF. Thomson Brandt kept approximately 40% of the company stock.

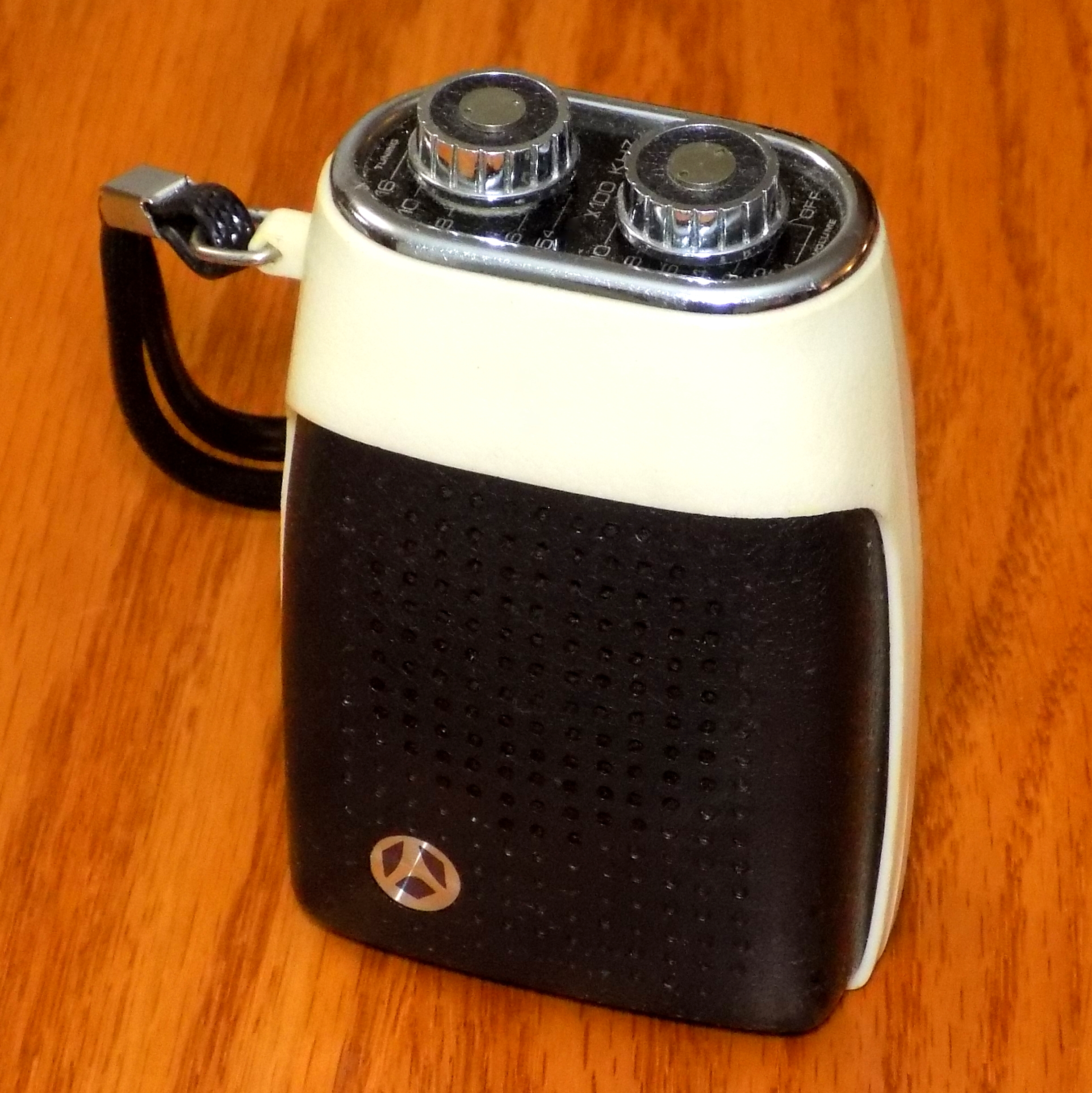
Thomson-CSF pocket radio (1972)

Logo of Thomson consumer electronics products

=== 1982: Thomson SA and its expansion ===
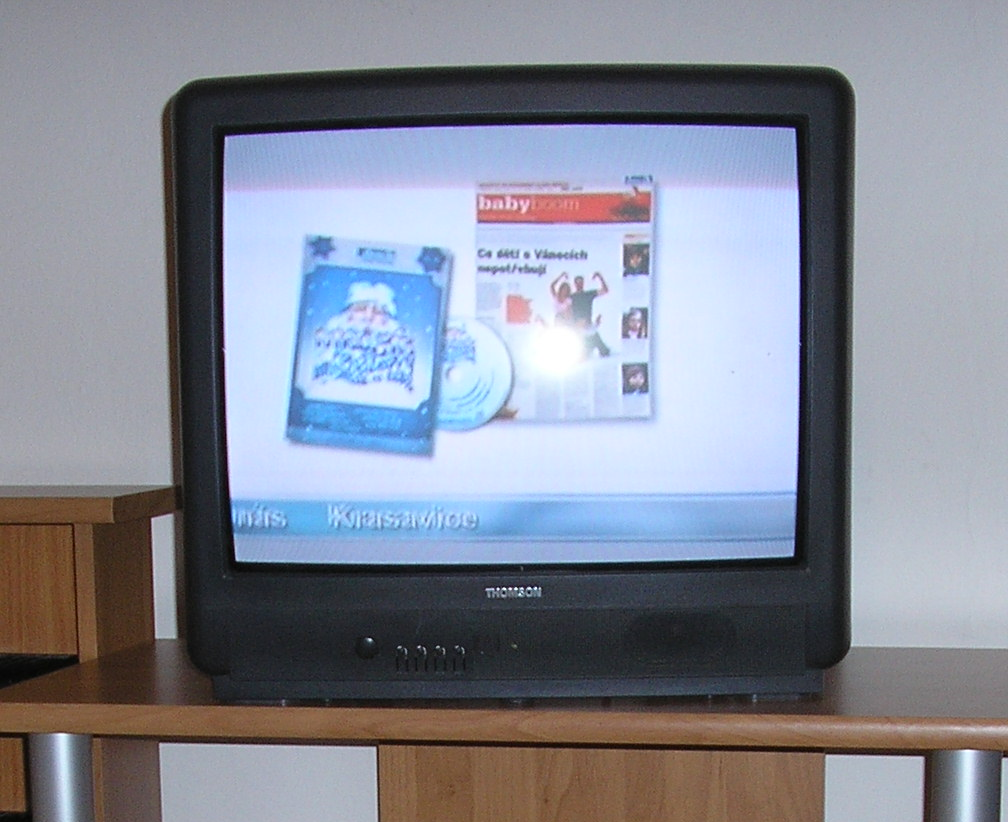
In the 1990s, Thomson was known in Europe for its production of CRT televisions.

In 1982, both Thomson-Brandt and Thomson-CSF were nationalized due to the efforts of François Mitterrand. Thomson-Brandt was subsequently renamed Thomson SA (Société Anonyme), and soon thereafter merged with Thomson-CSF. The Thomson Group was created, comprising Thomson-CSF, which focused on radio and broadcasting equipment and later electronics for defense and aerospace, and Thomson Multimedia which focused on consumer electronics. In 1988, two years after General Electric acquired the RCA Corporation, GE sold its consumer electronics division to Thomson, in exchange for some of Thomson's medical businesses. Thomson Consumer Electronics was formed to market products under the GE and RCA brand names. In 1995, the French government split the consumer electronics from the defense businesses of Thomson Multimedia and Thomson-CSF prior to privatization in 1999. Following privatization, Thomson-CSF went through a series of acquisitions, including with Marconi plc, before becoming Thales in 2000. In 2005, Thomson bought Cirpack and Inventel.

On February 13, 1997, Thomson Consumer Electronics announced it would close its RCA television plant in Bloomington, Indiana, shifting production to Ciudad Juárez, Mexico.

In 2000, Thomson Multimedia purchased Technicolor from Carlton Television (owned by Carlton Communications) in the UK and began a move into the broadcast management, facilities and services market with the purchase of Corinthian Television, becoming Thomson Multimedia. In Q1 of 2001 it purchased the Broadcast Division of Koninklijke Philips (Philips Broadcast) then in 2002 acquired the Grass Valley Group, Inc. from Dr. Terence Gooding of San Diego, CA. Thomson then purchased the Moving Picture Company from ITV and the internet startup Singingfish, but then sold it to AOL in late 2004. In 2004, Thomson increased its stake in the Bangalore, India, based company Celstream Technologies, which specializes in product engineering. Cirpack, a softswitch manufacturer, was incorporated and acquired in April 2005. In July 2005, Thomson agreed to purchase PRN Corporation for $285 million. In December 2005, Thomson re-purchased the Broadcast & Multimedia part of Thales Group.

In 2004, Thomson set up a joint venture with China's TCL named "TCL-Thomson Electronics" (TTE), giving to TCL all manufacturing of RCA and Thomson television and DVD products and making TCL the global leader in TV manufacturing (Thomson still controlled the brands themselves and licensed them to TTE). At the time, TCL was hailed as the first Chinese company to compete on the international stage with large international corporations. Thomson initially retained all marketing of TTE's products, but transferred that to TTE in 2005. In June 2005, the Videocon Group of India announced that it would acquire the color picture tube manufacturing business from Thomson SA for €240 million. In early 2010, Thomson sold the rights to manufacture RCA branded televisions to ON Corporation.

In September 2005, Thomson first showed its Infinity camcorder. At the April 2006 launch, this was described as "a new line of IT-based acquisition, recording and storage devices." It was designed to end the stranglehold of proprietary products in this market, and was inspired by a Grass Valley executive's trip to Fry's Electronics in Burbank to buy a computer backup device. The product failed to take market share from the predominant players in News Acquisition, Sony and Panasonic. It was too heavy and used too much power, which reduced battery life and increased heat. Its production was discontinued in 2010.

In February 2007, Thomson Multimedia's Technicolor Content Services division announced that it had invested in Indian animation studio Paprikaas to expand its entertainment services capabilities. In December 2007, Technicolor partnered with DreamWorks Animation to assist Paprikass in the "recruitment, training and development of top-tier animation talent". By January 2010, Technicolor had raised its ownership in Paprikaas to 100%. Following the acquisition, Technicolor's Indian offices in Delhi were merged into Paprikaas, and the resulting studio was rebranded Technicolor India in May 2010.

In December 2007, Thomson SA agreed to sell off its Audio/Video and Accessories businesses (sold under the RCA and Thomson brands) except for communications products such as cordless phones to Audiovox. In October 2007, Thomson SA agreed to sell its consumer electronics audio video business outside Europe including the worldwide rights to the RCA brand.

=== 2009–2010: Rebranding to Technicolor ===
On 29 January 2009, Thomson announced its intention to sell the PRN and Grass Valley businesses to focus on services business and improve its financial position. This was one of the consequences of an enormous financial crisis in 2009, which forced the company to a total financial restructuring to avoid bankruptcy. From 2010 to February 2011, "Technicolor" (having rebranded itself) divested these sub-businesses: Grass Valley and Broadcast to the Francisco Partners in July and December along with the Transmission business to PARTER Capital Group; Head-end to the FCDE (Fonds de Consolidation et de Développement des Entreprises), and reintegration of PRN.

On 20 June 2012, Vector Capital won a competitive bid for a minority stake in Technicolor, beating JP Morgan with a surprise, last-minute bid. With the investment of €167 - 191 million, Vector Capital will retain a minority stake in Technicolor of up to 29.94%. Following the deal, on 21 June 2012, Technicolor named Remy Sautter as Chairman of the Board and appointed two Vector Capital representatives to the board, Alexander Slusky and David Fishman.

On 3 July 2012, the Technicolor broadcast services division was acquired by Ericsson.

=== 2014: Creative studios acquisitions ===
On 10 June 2014, Technicolor announced the acquisition of the Canadian VFX studio Mr. X Inc. The same year the company also shut down its last film lab.

On 25 February 2015, Technicolor acquired the French independent animation producer OuiDo! Productions. On July 23 of the same year, Cisco Systems announced the sale of its television set-top box and cable modem business to Technicolor for $600 million—part of a division originally formed by Cisco's $6.9 billion purchase of Scientific Atlanta. The deal was closed on November 20 same year.

On 15 September 2015, Technicolor acquired London-based The Mill for €259 million, or $293.4 million.

On 13 November 2015, Technicolor acquired the North American optical disc manufacturing and distribution assets from Cinram Group, Inc. for approximately €40 million.

In July 2018, Technicolor closed the sale of its Patent Licensing business to InterDigital for $475m and in February 2019, announced it has received a binding offer for its Research & Innovation Activity from the same company.

In December 2019, Technicolor and its former CEO, Frederic Rose, were indicted in France on charges of fraud and breach of trust in connection with their role in the bankruptcy of Tarak Ben Ammar's post-production group, Quinta Industries, and its subsequent acquisition of the company in January 2012.

=== 2020–present: Restructuring and rebranding to Vantiva ===
In June 2020, Technicolor filed for Chapter 15 bankruptcy due to the COVID-19 pandemic and went through a restructuring process following the appointment of former Eir CEO Richard Moat. In 2021, the Technicolor post-production brand was sold to LA-based Streamland Media. The sale was part of a strategic decision to focus on visual effects and animation for film, advertising, gaming and live events.

Following the restructuring, Technicolor reported "a positive third quarter 2021, and a significant improvement in profitability, despite supply constraint challenges affecting both Connecting Home and Technicolor Creative Studios."

Meanwhile, in May 2021, Technicolor launched Technicolor Creative Studios, forming a global structure to drive its family of studios. The studio network included The Mill, MPC (Film, Episodic & Advertising), Mikros Animation and Mr. X. Christian Roberton, President of Technicolor Creative Studios announced that up to 4,000 VFX artists were anticipated to be hired.

In January 2022, The Mill united with MPC Advertising to create one global studio network under The Mill brand. As a global studio The Mill made the decision to scale up for a creative future, investing in new talent, production capabilities, and immersive technologies.

In the same month, Technicolor Creative Studios announced the integration of MPC Film, MPC Episodic and MR. X under Moving Picture Company (MPC), forming the largest suite of VFX studios serving the feature film and episodic market globally.

In February 2022, Technicolor announced the spin-off of its Technicolor Creative Studios division into an independent entity to be listed on Euronext Paris. Technicolor SA was to retain 35% of the new company's capital. Technicolor also shared in its annual results that all three divisions of the group were profitable and two thirds of the 2022 pipeline were already booked for Technicolor Creative Studios, evidencing the dynamism of the film sector driven by the demand from streaming services.

Technicolor Creative Studios' spin-off was completed on 27 September 2022, on the same day Technicolor announced that the company as a whole would be rebranding to Vantiva. As of November 2022, Vantiva still owned 35% of TCS but TCS still operated as an independent entity from Vantiva.

In October 2023, Vantiva announced its plan to acquire CommScope’s Home Networks division in exchange for a 25% stake in Vantiva. The acquisition of CommScope's Home Network was completed on 2 January 2024.

Vantiva acquired CommScope's Home Networks on 2 January 2024. On 24 February 2025, Vantiva announced restructuring efforts in response to financial difficulties, which resulted in the closure of certain operations. In April 2025, Vantiva announced the sale of its Supply Chain Solution division to funds managed by private equity firm, Variant Equity.The Supply Chain Solution division became known as Conectiv.

== Company units ==
=== Current ===
==== Connected Home ====
Connected Home is Vantiva's division producing broadband gateway boxes, set-top boxes and Android TV. As of September 2020, it had the highest market share (outside of China) in the broadband gateways and modems market.

=== Smart Spaces ===
Smart Storage sells systems for real-time monitoring of physical and environmental conditions of self-storage facilities, allowing remote management by premise managers and the facility's customers.

In September 2023, Vantiva launched a sub-division of Smart Spaces called Smart Storage.

HomeSight®

HomeSight is a connected care platform developed by Vantiva to help older adults live independently while staying connected to caregivers, family, and healthcare providers. Using the television as its primary interface, it offers video calling, photo sharing, health reminders, and access to virtual communities.

The system also includes environmental sensors and medical device integration to monitor daily activity and wellness, providing real-time data to personalize care.

=== Former ===
==== Trademark Licensing ====
Technicolor's Trademark Licensing division owned and managed consumer electronics brands such as RCA and Thomson. On 31 May 2022, Technicolor closed the sale of its Trademark Licensing operations for c.€100 million.

==== Technicolor Creative Studios ====
Technicolor Creative Studios operates four main studios:

- The Mill, specialized in visual effects, moving image, design, experiential and digital projects for the advertising and music industries
- Moving Picture Company (MPC), providing visual effects, CGI, animation and motion design for film and TV
- Mikros Animation, which provides CGI and animation for feature, long-form and episodic animated film
- Technicolor Games, which creates content and immersive experiences for the gaming industry.

== Executive management ==
=== Executive committee ===
- Tim O' Loughling - CEO
- Lars Ihlen - CFO
- Aline Bourcereau - Chief Compliance & Sustainability Officer
- Dan Zambrano - Chief Legal Officer
- Nicolas Calbrix - Head of Group Controlling
- Phil Baldock - Group Chief Operating Officer
- Olga Damiron - Chief People and Talent Officer
- Jean-François Fleury - Senior Vice President Connected Home, Global Supply Chain & Operations
- Ron Alterio - Senior Vice President, Connected Home, Engineering
- Ashwani Saigal - Senior Vice President Connected Home, Product Management
- Dirk Cosemans - Senior Vice President Connected Home, Customer Unit, Eurasia
- Steve Kaufman - Senior Vice President Connected Home, Customer Unit, Americas
- Navneeth Kannan - Senior Vice President, Diversification Solutions

=== Board of directors ===
- Brian Shearer - Chairperson
- Tim O' Loughlin - CEO and Director
- CommScope Holding Company, Inc., Represented by Krista Bowen - Director
- Angelo Gordon & Co., L.P. represented by Nicola Mueller - Director
- Bpifrance Participations represented by Thierry Sommelet - Independent Director
- Laurence Lafont - Independent Director
- Tony Werner - Independent Director
- Katleen Vandeweyer - Independent Director
- Karine Brunet - Independent Director
- Thierry Amarger - Independent Director
- Barclays Bank Ireland, represented by Shabab Ditta - Board Observer

== See also ==
- Thomson Broadcast, company spun out of Thomson's broadcasting equipment business
- STMicroelectronics, formed by the merger of Thomson-CSF's semiconductor business with an Italian semiconductor company
