= Philip R. Shawe =

American co-founder and CEO of TransPerfect in 1992

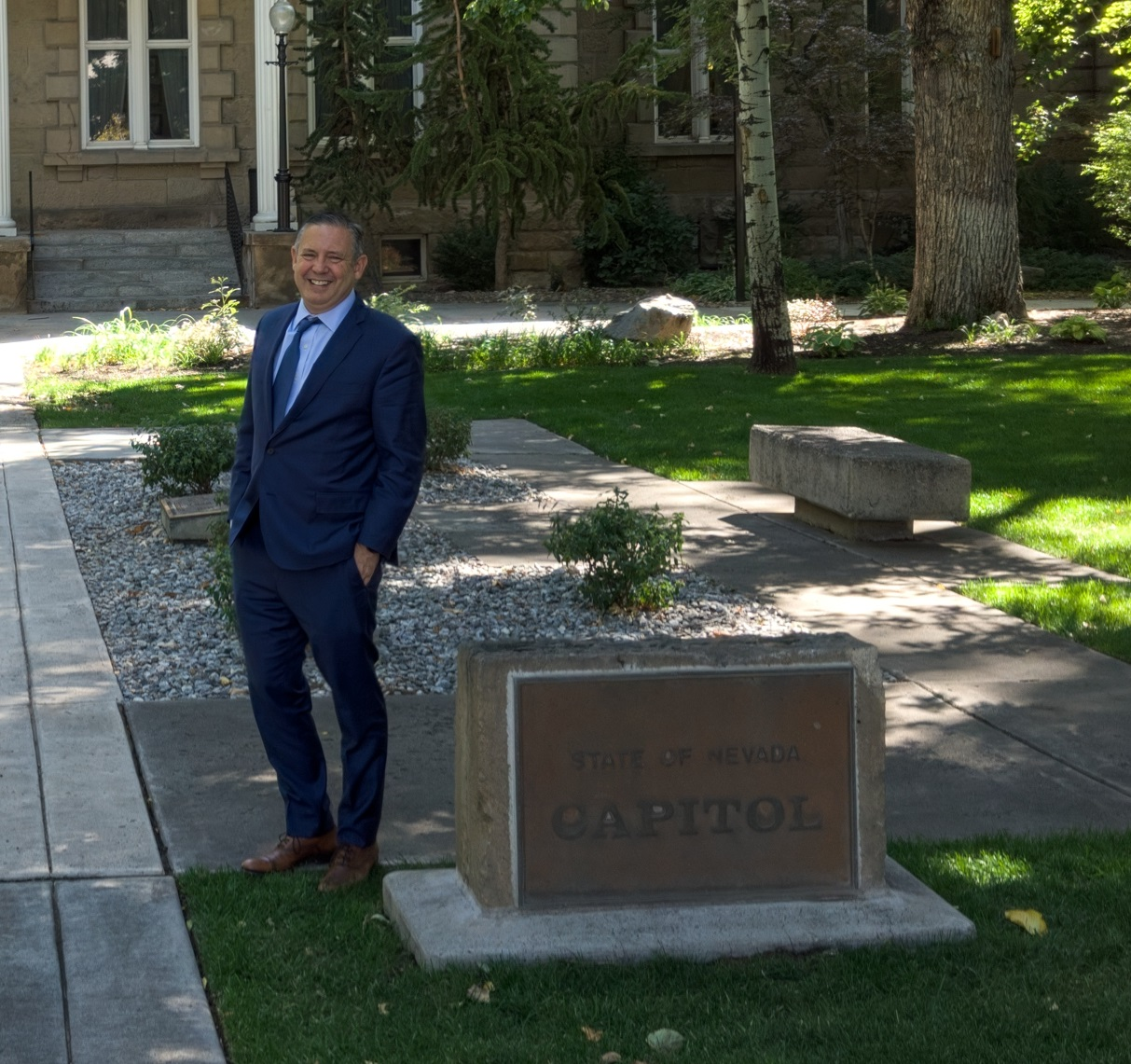
- Born: August 18, 1969 (age 57)
- Occupations: Founder and CEO of TransPerfect

Philip Reid Shawe "Phil" (born August 19, 1969) is an American businessperson. He is the Co-Founder and current Co-CEO of TransPerfect. He has overseen the day-to-day operations of the company since its founding in 1992. Shawe was named Entrepreneur of the Year for New York City by Ernst & Young and named to Crain's New York “40 Under 40 list” as one of the top young executives in New York.

== Biography ==
Shaw was born in 1969 to Shirley and Irvin Shawe in Kentucky. He attended New York University. While at NYU, he and Elizabeth Elting founded TransPerfect.

== Career ==
Shawe began his career after graduating NYU with a position at Chemical Bank in New York. When Chemical Banking Corporation merged with Manufacturers Hanover Corp. in 1991, Shawe quit to join Elting in a new translation service business.

From 1992 until 2018, Shawe had been the co-CEO of TransPerfect. TransPerfect had grown every quarter since its founding. Since May 2018, he has been the sole CEO.

In 2019, Shawe announced that TransPerfect will move the company's Manhattan headquarters from 3 Park Avenue to Eyal Ofer's NoMad Tower. Due to the Coronavirus pandemic the NoMad office construction was slowed down and the offices of TransPerfect went largely remote. On April 11, 2023, New York City Mayor Eric Adams cut the ribbon on the new TransPerfect entrance to NoMad Tower, inaugurating the return to in-office work and celebrating the completion of the office renovations of the seven floors the firm leased in the building. Shawe celebrated Mayor Adams' presence at the ribbon cutting by penning an article welcoming Adams' work of making more pedestrian walk spaces and bikeways using streets where cars once dominated.

The achievement of TransPerfect under Shawe's and his sales and fulfillment teams in reaching over $1.2 billion in revenues for 2022 garnered Shawe the cover of translation industry magazine, Multilingual.

Shawe built his team with the idea of “paying it forward”. When someone attains a certain level of success in the TransPerfect system, Shawe asks them to repay the success by coaching the next generation of leaders.

=== TransPerfect Legal Challenge ===
Beginning in 2014, TransPerfect's two co-founders became entangled in a legal fight for control of the company. Since the founding of the company, Shawe and Elting had repeatedly clashed.

Elting and Shawe filed several suits against each other, each seeking injunctive relief and restructuring of TransPerfect.

Elting's action in New York's state courts was ultimately dismissed.

Shawe and Elting's dispute in Delaware Chancery Court set a significant precedent in corporate law. Elting sought a forced sale of the company based on Delaware statutory law. Following significant mediation, and a $300 million offer from Shawe to purchase Elting's shares, Chancellor Andre Bouchard found that the directors of the company were irreparably deadlocked, and that, because both of them effectively held half of the company's shares, the only viable remedy was the appointment of a custodian and a forced sale.

As part of that long-running Delaware litigation, Philip Shawe and TransPerfect have been sanctioned for lying under oath, destroying evidence, and willfully violating court orders. Elting's attorneys at the firm Kramer Levin were also sanctioned for obstruction during a deposition during the case. The Delaware Supreme Court ultimately vacated the sanctions against Shawe and TransPerfect.

Ultimately, Shawe bought Elting's shares for $385 million. The sale price was slightly higher than his offer of $325 Million to Elting prior to the conclusion of the public auction, but it was not the billion dollar valuation that Elting, and the Custodian had believed. Shawe therefore became the sole owner of TransPerfect.

Shawe has been outspoken on what he considers to be corruption in the Chancery Court. He believes, "Delaware is governed by an unelected and omnipotent Chancery Court that no longer serves the interests of the masses... Instead, it benefits a small circle of judges, law firms and lawyers who make billion-dollar decisions with no accountability."

Once he became the sole owner of Transperfect, Shawe moved all of his corporate holdings from Delaware to Nevada. Some Delaware corporate law commentators have characterized Shawe as litigious and someone who engaged "in a spiteful personal vendetta" via a public attack ad campaign against Chancellor Andre Bouchard following Bouchard's decision to order the unique and rarely used remedy of a forced sale of a successful company that was not in danger of bankruptcy or financial stress.

In 2020, Shawe was a guest lecturer of Yale Professor Jonathan Macey as part of his Financial Markets and Corporate Law Clinic about his experiences with the Delaware Chancery and Delaware's General Corporation Law.

In 2024, Shawe became more active in local politics in Delaware as a direct attempt to highlight what he deems as corruption within the Delaware judiciary. On September 10, 2024, Matt Meyer, Shawe's backed candidate for Governor won the primary election and will face the Republican challenger in the November election.

== Affiliations and philanthropy ==
Shawe has guest lectured on Entrepreneurship at New York University and Columbia University and is a member of the Association for a Better New York (ABNY). He had been a member of the board of directors of The Joyful Heart Foundation, a non-profit that worked in support of survivors of sexual assault, domestic violence, and child abuse. His philanthropic efforts include supporting over 25 causes by donating time or financial support, and he was named to The V Foundation for Cancer Research's Circle of Honor.

Shawe backs Girls Who Code, a group that helps women's equity and equality within the technology sectors. He has encouraged his employees to give and incentivizes them to do so. The company has raised over $250 thousand to date.

In 2018, Shawe sponsored ultramarathon runner Michele Graglia to run the Atacama Desert, for which Graglia was accepted into the Guinness Book. Shawe is sponsoring Graglia to run three more deserts - the Gobi, Sahara and Antarctica.

The sponsorship of Graglia is part of Shawe's management and motivational ethos. He fosters a culture of independence and problem-solving within his team and inspires and motivates them by encouraging camaraderie through shared experiences. He organizes adventurous trips and climbs, skis, and takes teams to visit exotic locations. Also, recognizing the value of each employee and office, Shawe personally travels to meet the staff at different company locations year-round, almost every month, emphasizing the significance of individual contributions to TransPerfect's operations.
