= TransPerfect =

American translation services company

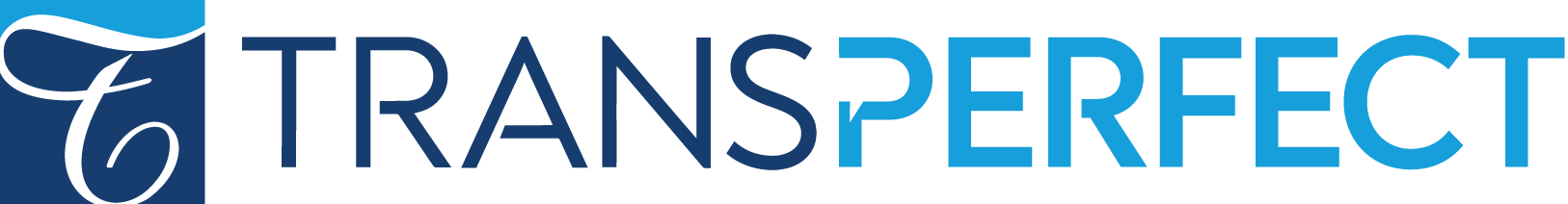
- Type: Private
- Industry: E-Discovery; Media
- Predecessor: Hitachi Recordings K.K. (1932–1994 in Japan)
- Founded: 1992; 34 years ago
- Founders: Elizabeth Elting; Phil Shawe
- Headquarters: New York City, United States
- Area served: Worldwide
- Key people: Phil Shawe (CEO)
- Products: GlobalLink; StudioNext; DataForce; AppLanga
- Services: Subtitling; Dubbing; Translation; Closed captioning
- Revenue: US$1,100,000,000 (2022)
- Number of employees: 7,000 (2021)
- Divisions: Translations.com; TransPerfect Legal Solutions; TransPerfect Life Sciences
- Subsidiaries: The Mill
- Website: transperfect.com

TransPerfect is an American translation and language services company. The company serves clients in many fields, such as film, gaming, law, and healthcare. As of 2012, TransPerfect is "the largest privately owned language services provider, with offices in over 100 cities worldwide" and more than 7,500 employees.

== History ==
TransPerfect's founders Elizabeth Elting and Phil Shawe met in a New York University (NYU) dormitory room and founded the company in 1992. With no external financing, TransPerfect grew from a two-person dormitory-based operation into one of the 125 largest privately held companies in the New York area.

In 1998, the firm began expanding worldwide. In 1999, TransPerfect established a technology division, launching Translations.com with several million dollars in outside investment to meet the demand for software and website translations. In 2004, they bought out their investors and merged TransPerfect and Translations.com.

The company grew using primarily live translation services from multilingual people all over the world. In 2003, TransPerfect began using Wordfast, which was initially developed as a platform-independent translation memory software. While TransPerfect used the Wordfast product under license, it remained a wholly separate entity that is operated by the software's founder Yves Champollion.

As its revenues grew to nearly $65 million in 2005, the firm continued making key acquisitions. TransPerfect acquired Crimson Language Services, a Boston-based medical and other highly regulated industries translation company.

Adding to its business, TransPerfect acquired Digital Reef in 2012 and entered the electronic discovery business.

In 2013, the company acquired Vasont Systems, a component content management system that helps companies publish multilingual technical documentation, product manuals, and other business information.

From 2015 to 2018, TransPerfect was involved in a legal dispute between its founders. It closed 2016 with sales at $546 million and its sales for the full year 2017 totaled $614.8 million. Two months after the conclusion of the three-year lawsuit that ended with Shawe becoming the sole owner, the company posted its most successful month's revenues in June 2018, at $62 million. It posted $337 million for the first half of 2018, which was up nearly 20% from 2017.

In 2019 the company acquired media localization companies in the areas of gaming and streaming services, and opened a new 900-seat facility in Arizona.

In 2019, TransPerfect acquired the marketing and naming rights to the annual Music City Bowl for a five-year period. The 2020 game was cancelled due to covid, making its sponsorship through 2025.

In 2021, TransPerfect acquired Swedish language-technology business Semantix for $100 million from the private equity fund Segulah Advisors. The acquisition allowed TransPerfect to provide translation and interpretation services for both the public and private sectors throughout the Nordic region, a place they previously had limited access.

In August 2022, TransPerfect acquired Sterling Technology, a European provider of virtual data rooms. The acquisition puts the companies in a better position to compete against the larger players in the VDR market, which businesses use to securely send and store information for complex financial transactions.

In October 2022, TransPerfect closed a deal to buy Paris based Hiventy Group, which specializes in technical audiovisual services including post-production, localization, distribution, and film restoration. The acquisition brings the total owned-and-operated footprint to over 90 recording rooms and eight theatrical rooms worldwide for the company.

The company posted its 2022 revenues at $1.16 billion, marking its 30th year of business and growth and 120 consecutive quarters of increased revenue for the privately held company.

In March 2025, TransPerfect acquired the French assets of MPC and The Mill from Technicolor Group.

== Legal activities ==
=== Founders dispute ===
Following an apparent difficulty in communications between one another, Elting considered her options regarding her 50% ownership of the company. Among the issues she was concerned with was the value of her 50% ownership share. Elting sought relief from the legal system. Shawe saw that as an attempt by Elting to use the courts to help her negotiate an exit agreement. In 2014, Elting sought to remove Shawe as an officer of TransPerfect Translations International, Inc. (TPI). Elting sought an injunction barring Shawe from conducting any managerial activity related to TransPerfect and sought the dissolution of TransPerfect, alleging that Shawe had engaged in "erratic and abusive behavior". New York State Supreme Court Justice Melvin Schweitzer dismissed the case, suggesting the two needed to work it out privately and not seek remedy from a court.

=== Forced sale ===
The suit was then taken to the Delaware Chancery where Elting reissued her complaint, and Shawe alleged that Elting had breached her fiduciary duties by not moving ahead with certain business-related opportunities, such as leases, acquisitions, and diverting funds for her own personal use. In August 2015, The Chancellor of the Delaware Chancery Court, Andre Bouchard, decided to have a third-party sell the shares of the company in a public auction.

Former New York Mayor Rudolph Giuliani chimed in and suggested that the court decision in Delaware would harm Delaware's status as a popular business incorporation state. NY Justice Schweitzer also publicly commented on the case in Delaware, saying, "I was kind of shocked at how extreme the result was... The company is still doing phenomenally well and I thought there were steps that should have been taken short of ordering a sale. That's what I would have done if I still had the case."

The argument against the Chancellor has been the misapplication of Delaware General Corporation Law, clause 226 that authorizes the sale of a company when it faces financial default and other catastrophic issues. Here, as the company has only proven to do even better each year, even during this lawsuit period. The defendants have argued that the company has not suffered and that the only remedy is the appointment of tie-breaking board member to help move issues along. Following Bouchard's decision, Shawe sought an appeal of the ruling and the oral argument was held on 18 January 2017.

For the appeal, Professor Alan Dershowitz argued for Shirley Shawe, a 1% owner in the company. Dershowitz argued that Chancellor Bouchard's decision was tantamount to an illegal constitutional taking. Delaware Chief justice Leo Strine argued back to Dershowitz that he had no right to bring that up since it was not in the initial case, and the two argued over the law. The appeal affirmed Bouchard's decision. Shawe and Dershowitz then suggested that they will petition the U.S. Supreme Court for certiorari. In March 2017, Shirley Shawe announced that she would attempt to break the manufactured corporate deadlock to end the legal case and stop the court imposed sale, and laid out a plan to vote her single share with Elting's 50%, giving Elting control to appoint five board members with staggered terms, making it mathematically improbable for deadlock to ensue. Elting's team rejected that offer, advising that there was already a sale order in place. On 2 June 2017, the Delaware Chancellor heard the case of Shirley Shawe's proposal to grant the votes of her 1% to Elting to cede control, and simultaneously heard the motion by Elting to sanction Shawe for trying to settle the case without the public sale. Bouchard appeared unsettled by the amount of media that this case has garnered, and stated that this case should settle out of court. During the hearing, he challenged Elting, asking her why she would not accept control of the company as she has stated she wanted during the initial case and the appeal, and her attorney intervened and stated that she would not run a company where Philip Shawe owned 49%.

Judge Bouchard chose to order mediation while still pursuing the public sale order, stating that he had appointed former Chancellor Bill Chandler to mediate, and would not rule on either motion for at least 30 days.

After the final round of bidding for the company on 10 November passed, late in the evening on 14 November 2017, Delaware State Senator Colin Bonini wrote an email to Chancellor Andre Bouchard asking to be permitted to oversee the review of bids. Bonini cited questions of "conflicts that would make the auction process appear 'rigged or invalid,'" dealing with Credit Suisse, the investment bank running the TransPerfect auction, and the law firm Skadden Arps, and one of the bidders that was allegedly intertwined with both. Bouchard notified the parties that he would not take any action on the letter, but entered it into the public record; several media then reported the letter and the allegations.

With more than two years of litigation and legal questions over whether a court can order the auction of a successful private company that is not in distress or bankruptcy, the court appointed custodian, Robert Pincus, a partner at Skadden Arps, announced in a 20 November 2017 email to the employees of the company, that Philip Shawe was the successful bidder in the public auction, and that he was in final talks to bring this matter to an end.

In November 2022, TransPerfect filed certiorari in the United States Supreme Court to challenge the Delaware Chancery's previous ruling of contempt and sanctions against TransPerfect for filing a suit across "jurisdictional lines" when the company challenged a set of Chancery rulings in Nevada, its state of incorporation. TransPerfect claimed the contempt finding violated rights protected by the First and Fourteenth amendments, arguing the company should have been permitted to proceed with its Nevada case and not allowing it to do so could serve as a warning to other corporate litigants.

Also, in November 2022, the company filed a securities fraud lawsuit against the former court appointed custodian Pincus and financial advisor Credit Suisse in the Federal District of Delaware. The suit claims the two intentionally led Shawe to overbid on his ex-partners TransPerfect shares by $70 million, by lying about the money Shawe would need to bid to gain control of Elting's TransPerfect shares in order to save face with the Chancery Court and get a bigger payout themselves. The company alleged that Pincus and Credit Suisse reportedly told TransPerfect and Shawe there had been bids higher than theirs in the auction, and that to successfully purchase Elting's shares, they would have to raise their bid an additional $70 million. The information for the complaint was based on information obtained during discovery in a New York litigation issue, and that Shawe's bid of $710 million was already the highest made in the auction when accounting for deductions and tax considerations.

=== Legal Billing Disputes ===
The company has since been contending that Pincus has continued to submit legal bills more than one year after his role ended in 2018, and attorneys for the company are seeking to have the legal bills itemized and explained, which Bouchard has continuously denied.

On 10 July 2019, one last issue of TransPerfect was raised before the Chancery court. Elting sued one more time for legal bills that she claimed were owed to her by the company under her indemnification clause, while the company maintained that it paid what was due and that these expenses fell outside of the agreement.

Another set of legal disputes rising from issues related to the protracted sale order case in Delaware, TransPerfect and Shawe had claimed that Skadden Arps had been billing excessively for work it would not explain, and the Chancellor granted the law firm's fee requests without Transperfect having an opportunity to review it. Chancellor Bouchard had sided with the law firm and continued to permit it to submit invoices for unspecified work. Shawe contended that the invoices be itemized and made public, but the Chancellor agreed with Skadden that by requiring a law firm to disclose what it was billing in a public forum could harm the ability for companies registered in Delaware to protect its interests. The Chancellor agreed and mandated that the invoices must remain hidden, but lawyers for Shawe and TransPerfect could view limited details and then, within a certain time frame, submit disputes to items it takes issue with. As a result, Skadden Arps has included in its billing to TransPerfect, charges to defend its interests against Shawe's requests to see itemized invoices.

=== Employee group forms ===
Included in this case has been a campaign waged by a group that calls itself Citizens for a Pro-Business Delaware to lobby the legislature to change the chancery rules regarding the forced sale of a private, well performing company. The group claims over 1200 members. "Citizens " built a website, has run television commercials, taken billboard and newspaper ads, petitioned elected leaders and held press conferences to press the issue of their concern for the jobs that may be lost and the impact this decision would have on Delaware's ability to continue attracting new companies to incorporate in the state.

=== Controversial legal issues ===
There have been charges of unethical actions by Elting's law firm Kramer Levin Naftalis & Frankel, which was sanctioned by the Chancery Court for "repeatedly instruct[ing] a witness not to answer questions."

A defamation suit was filed by Shirley Shawe against Kramer Levin, claiming that its lead attorney on the case "crossed the line" by making false statements in connection with the Delaware sale case that "were intended to damage Shawe's business and personal reputation," while talking to a reporter about the case. Citing that same interview, attorney Philip Kaufman was also accused of contradicting himself when he argued before the appeal court from what he claimed to the reporter. Shawe ran a series of TV ads highlighting the varying sets of comments made by Kaufman and the video was posted to YouTube.
