= Cirpack =

French telecommunications software company

- Company type: Private
- Industry: Telecommunications software
- Founded: 1999
- Founder: Fred Potter
- Headquarters: Paris, France
- Number of locations: 4
- Area served: Worldwide
- Key people: Patrick Bergougnou (CEO)
- Products: Softswitch, SBC, IMS, Unified communications platforms
- Website: https://www.cirpack.com/

Cirpack is a French telecommunications software company that develops core network and communication platforms for telecom operators, internet service providers and enterprise communication providers. Its software is used in next-generation telecommunications networks to support IP-based voice services and IMS-based communications, including through softswitch architectures. Cirpack operates in the telecommunications core network software market, providing platforms used by operators to deliver and manage voice communication services across IP-based infrastructures. The company's platforms are used within telecom core networks to manage voice traffic routing, interconnection between operators and the delivery of communication services across heterogeneous network environments. These architectures are used by telecom operators to support mobile voice services such as Voice over LTE (VoLTE) and Voice over New Radio (VoNR), enabling native voice communications over 4G and 5G mobile networks. Industry publications report that Cirpack platforms are deployed by telecommunications operators across multiple regions, supporting large-scale voice communication infrastructures.

== History ==
Cirpack was founded in 1999 by French telecommunications engineer Fred Potter as a spin-off from the long-distance carrier Kaptech. Kaptech had developed expertise in switching technologies and international voice routing, and Cirpack was created to address the transition of telecommunications networks from circuit-switched infrastructures toward packet-based communications. From its inception, the company focused on software platforms enabling telecommunications operators to migrate legacy voice networks toward Voice over IP (VoIP) and Next Generation Network (NGN) architectures.

These platforms were developed in the context of the transition from public switched telephone networks (PSTN) to packet-based next-generation network (NGN) architectures, enabling operators to progressively migrate legacy voice services to IP-based infrastructures.During the early 2000s, Cirpack developed softswitch platforms used by telecommunications operators, internet service providers and wholesale carriers to deploy IP-based telephony services. These platforms allowed operators to route voice traffic through IP networks while maintaining interoperability with traditional Time-division multiplexing (TDM) infrastructure during the migration toward all-IP networks. These platforms were developed in the context of the transition from public switched telephone networks (PSTN) to packet-based next-generation network (NGN) architectures, enabling operators to progressively migrate legacy voice services to IP-based infrastructures.

In April 2005, Cirpack was acquired by Thomson SA, later renamed Technicolor. As part of Technicolor's telecommunications equipment portfolio, Cirpack continued developing software platforms for IP-based voice networks and operator interconnection infrastructures.

In 2010, Cirpack introduced a Session Border Controller (SBC) product line designed to secure and manage SIP interconnections between VoIP networks and telecom operators. In 2011, the company expanded its portfolio with application platforms supporting advanced telephony features and unified communication services.

In April 2014, Patrick Bergougnou became Chief Executive Officer of Cirpack. Under his leadership the company began repositioning itself toward software-driven telecommunications platforms and enterprise communication services delivered through telecom operators.

In 2015, Cirpack completed a management buyout and raised €3 million from financial backers including Bpifrance and Midi Capital. In July of the same year, the company acquired Andrexen, a French developer of Voice over IP and unified communications software. The acquisition expanded Cirpack’s capabilities in enterprise communication services.

In September 2016, Cirpack acquired Amplement, a French professional social networking platform. Cirpack said the acquisition was intended to enrich its collaboration and unified communications capabilities.

Over time, Cirpack expanded its software portfolio to address the evolution of telecommunications infrastructures toward all-IP and mobile broadband networks. In addition to softswitch and SBC platforms, the company developed solutions based on IP Multimedia Subsystem (IMS) architectures used by telecom operators to deliver multimedia communication services across fixed and mobile networks. These technologies support mobile voice services such as Voice over LTE (VoLTE), Wi-Fi calling (VoWiFi) and Voice over New Radio (VoNR), enabling telecom operators to deploy native voice services in 4G and 5G mobile networks and to support fixed–mobile convergence. Cirpack platforms are designed to comply with telecommunications standards such as the Session Initiation Protocol (SIP), as defined by the Internet Engineering Task Force (IETF), and the IP Multimedia Subsystem (IMS) specifications standardized by the 3rd Generation Partnership Project (3GPP), enabling interoperability across fixed and mobile multi-vendor network environments.

Cirpack also developed service platforms enabling telecom operators and service providers to deliver enterprise communication services such as IP Centrex and Cloud PBX. These platforms are typically provided by telecom operators to business customers as part of unified communications and hosted telephony services.

IMS Cirpack platforms can be deployed in cloud environments and are also offered through service-based models, enabling operators to simplify network operations and deliver communication services without managing underlying infrastructure complexity.

The company further expanded its product ecosystem with mobile communication applications such as UP! (Uniquity Pocket), a softphone application allowing users to place and receive calls from smartphones using a Session Initiation Protocol (SIP) account associated with an operator or enterprise communication platform.

In 2026, Cirpack and Halys announced the integration of their respective platforms to deliver a private 5G solution with native VoNR capabilities for industrial and enterprise environments.

In the mid-2020s, Cirpack has been involved in the deployment of Voice over LTE (VoLTE) services based on IP Multimedia Subsystem (IMS) architectures, as part of the transition from legacy voice networks to all-IP infrastructures.

Cirpack and Summa Networks collaborated on a VoLTE deployment for Vodafone Polynésie, aimed at enabling mobile voice services over 4G networks.
