= Moving Picture Company =

British visual effects company

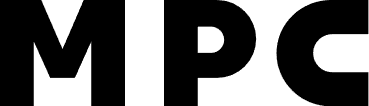
- Logo used since 2023
- Type: Subsidiary
- Industry: Motion picture Visual effects Computer animation Advertising
- Founded: 1970 in London
- Founder: Mike Luckwell
- Defunct: 2026
- Fate: Absorbed into The Mill
- Successor: The Mill
- Headquarters: Paris, France
- Services: Visual effects; Animation; Motion graphics
- Parent: Carlton Communications (1983–2004); Technicolor SA (2004–2022); Technicolor Group (2022–2025); TransPerfect (2025–present)
- Website: www.mpcvfx.com

The Moving Picture Company (MPC) was a British, later French visual effects and computer animation studio based in Paris. A subsidiary of TransPerfect, the company, alongside specializing in visual effects and computer animation, also provides motion graphics and other services for film, television, brand experience, and advertising.

Their artists have produced Academy Award-winning work for films including 1917, The Jungle Book and Life of Pi.

It was headquartered in London with facilities located in Los Angeles, New York City, Toronto, Montreal, Bangalore, Mumbai, Adelaide, Amsterdam, Paris, Berlin and Shanghai. It is now headquartered in Paris following Technicolor's bankruptcy.

In February 2025, news reports have stated that MPC's parent company, Technicolor Group, had appointed administrators. It was unclear what the consequences of this will be for MPC. Technicolor Group had later shut down its operations, including MPC, as the result of “experiencing difficulties” due to “post-Covid recovery, a costly and complex separation from the previous group followed by the writers’ strike”.

In March 2025, TransPerfect acquired the French assets of MPC. This sale also included their Belgian studio, but not their operations in the United Kingdom, Canada, United States, India, or Australia.

As of June 2026, TransPerfect has announced that the company would be absorbed into The Mill.

== History ==
=== Founding ===
MPC was established by Mike Luckwell in 1970, starting as a production company producing TV commercials and in 1978 the studio began delving into video, acquiring broadcast standard video recorders and TV cameras. MPC continued to grow; moving into video post-production and by 1983 was known for post-production and visual effects for the advertising and feature film industries.

Luckwell sold MPC to Carlton Communications in 1983 and in doing so; he became Carlton's managing director and largest individual shareholder. During Carlton's 2004 merger with Granada to create ITV plc, they sold MPC to French group Thomson SA for £52.7 million. Following the acquisition, Thomson, now known as Technicolor SA, aimed to make MPC grow by acquiring more film work. By the end of the decade, MPC had become one of the leading visual effects companies.

=== Expansion ===
MPC Film has grown from a small team in London to more than 3000 employees worldwide.

In 2007, MPC Film created a new facility in Vancouver, where a core team – some originally from London and others native to Vancouver, began work on Zack Snyder’s Watchmen. Since then, MPC Vancouver has worked on several feature films, including Skyscraper, Alpha and Fantastic Beasts and Where to Find Them. However, the Vancouver office announced its closure in 2019.

In summer 2008, the opening of MPC LA, a commercials post shop operating in Santa Monica, California. They have since completed jobs for commercial directors including Fredrik Bond, Filip Engstrom and Traktor as well as completing Super Bowl spots.

Around the same time as opening in Santa Monica, MPC Digital came into being, to create and re-purpose digital assets for the internet as well as new media applications and handheld devices. The MPC Datalab offered a service to manage digital acquisition and establish tapeless HD workflows.

After eight years at its Santa Monica location, MPC moved to a larger 25,000-square-foot studio in Culver City. MPC Film launched creative services in the studio including concept and production design, visualization, business development, virtual production and VFX supervisors representation. MPC Advertising has resources dedicated to VFX, color and finishing services. The space also plays host to a purpose-built VR/AR infrastructure and its content production arm, MPC Creative.

MPC Bangalore officially opened in October 2010. Being plugged into MPC's pipeline and production network, MPC Bangalore is able to share software development and in-house tools. However, Bangalore and Mumbai offices announced its closure in February 2025, causing Technicolor's bankruptcy. In early April, after acquisition by TransPerfect, MPC will open the Singapore studio.

At the start of 2011, MPC NYC was officially opened in SoHo, offering a range of integrated services and provides Color Grading and Digital, Design and Production Services across the US markets.

MPC Film also opened a studio in Montreal in 2013 and has since worked on feature films including, Alien: Covenant, Blade Runner 2049, Ghost in the Shell, The Greatest Showman, The Revenant and The Martian. The studio received an Academy Award nomination for one of its first films X-Men: Days of Future Past.

== Notable people, sponsors, and projects ==
=== Long-time collaborators ===
Over the past 50 years, MPC Film has collaborated with many notable directors and VFX supervisors. Directors including Tim Burton, Ridley Scott, Zack Snyder, Jon Favreau, David Yates, and Kenneth Branagh have collaborated with MPC on many of their projects.

Ridley Scott has collaborated with MPC on a wide range of his films including Robin Hood, Prometheus and The Martian, receiving an Academy Award, BAFTA and VES nominations.

For Jon Favreau's 2016 live-action remake of The Jungle Book, a team of more than 800 computer graphics artists worked for over a year, animating over 54 species of animal, crafting full CGI environments, and simulating earth, fire, and water. 224 unique animals were created and new computer programs were created to better simulate muscles, skin, and fur. For each shot and each movement, animation artists followed extensive research in animal behavior, so that even the subtlest behavioral traits would translate into performances the audience would recognize from the animal kingdom. Most recently, MPC worked on Walt Disney’s The Lion King with Jon Favreau directing. MPC's VFX supervisors are Adam Valdez and Elliot Newman.

Tim Burton has collaborated with MPC since the early 2000s, on projects including Corpse Bride, Sweeney Todd: The Demon Barber of Fleet Street, Charlie and the Chocolate Factory, Dark Shadows and Dumbo.

MPC has also collaborated with Zack Snyder, including; Watchmen, Sucker Punch, Man of Steel, Batman V Superman: Dawn of Justice and Justice League.

MPC represents VFX supervisors including Erik Nash, Richard Stammers, Adam Valdez and Nick Davis.

MPC's most frequent sponsors include: Sony, Coca-Cola, Warner Bros., Walt Disney, HBO, Samsung, NBCUniversal, BMW, Hennessy, and Paramount Global.

=== Digital humans ===
MPC’s work on digital humans includes work on Rachael for Blade Runner 2049 and Arnold Schwarzenegger for Terminator Genisys where the T-800 is in the form of a 1984 Arnold Schwarzenegger.

MPC has a R&D lab, named “Shadow Lab”, developing a number of different new technologies, including digital humans.

=== Genesis ===
In recent years, Technicolor's R&I team collaborated with MPC's R&D division to create a virtual production platform called Genesis; Genesis is MPC's Virtual Production platform.

== Accolades ==
MPC won three Academy Awards for its work on the films 1917, The Jungle Book, Life of Pi and three BAFTA Awards for its work on 1917 The Jungle Book and Harry Potter and the Deathly Hallows: Part 2. MPC has also received VES Awards for The Lion King, The Jungle Book, The Lone Ranger, Life of Pi and Kingdom of Heaven.

Awards and nominations
Year	Project	Award	For	Result
2022	Prehistoric Planet	Televisual Bulldog Award	Best Visual Effects	Won
2022	Prehistoric Planet	Broadcast Tech	Best Visual Effects	Won
2022	Finch	VES Award	Outstanding Animated Character in a Photoreal Feature	Won
2022	Nope	Concept Art Award	Live-Action Feature Film: Creature	Won
2022	Ghostbusters Afterlife	BAFTA	Best Special Visual Effects	Nominated
2022	Nightmare Alley	VES Award	Outstanding Supporting Visual Effects	Nominated
2022	Vikings: Valhalla	Emmy	Outstanding Supporting Visual Effects	Nominated
2022	The Last Duel	VES Award	Outstanding Supporting Visual Effects	Nominated
2022	The Signal	Canadian Screen Award	Best Visual Effects	Nominated
2021	The One and Only Ivan	Academy Award	Best Visual Effects	Nominated
2021	The One and Only Ivan	BAFTA Award	Best Special Visual Effects	Nominated
2021	The One and Only Ivan	VES Award	Outstanding Animated Character in a Photoreal Feature	Won
2021	Underwater	VES Award	Outstanding Compositing in a Feature Motion Picture	Nominated
2020	The One and Only Ivan	HPA Award	Best Visual Effects	Won
2020	1917	Academy Award	Best Visual Effects	Won
2020	1917	BAFTA Award	Best Special Visual Effects	Won
2020	The Lion King	Academy Award	Best Visual Effects	Nominated
2020	The Lion King	BAFTA Award	Best Special Visual Effects	Nominated
2020	The Lion King	AEAF Award	Best Visual Effects	Won
2020	The Lion King	VES Award	Outstanding Visual Effects in a Photoreal feature	Won
2020	The Lion King	VES Award	Outstanding Created Environment in a Photoreal feature	Won
2020	The Lion King	VES Award	Outstanding Effects Simulations in a Photoreal feature	Nominated
2018	Blade Runner 2049	VES Award	Outstanding Animated Character in a Photoreal Feature	Nominated
2018	Blade Runner 2049	HPA Award	Outstanding Visual Effects - Feature Film	Nominated
2017	The Jungle Book	Academy Award	Best Visual Effects	Won
2017	The Jungle Book	BAFTA Award	Best Achievement in Special Visual Effects	Won
2017	The Jungle Book	VES Award	Outstanding Achievement in Character Animation in a Live Action Production	Won
2017	The Jungle Book	HPA Award	Outstanding Visual Effects - Feature Film	Won
2017	The Jungle Book	Annie Award	Outstanding Visual Effects in a Photoreal Feature	Won
2017	Sully	VES Award	Outstanding Supporting Visual Effects in a Photoreal Feature	Nominated
2016	The Martian	Academy Award	Best Visual Effects	Nominated
2016	The Martian	BAFTA Award	Best Achievement in Special Visual Effects	Nominated
2016	The Martian	VES Award	Outstanding Visual Effects in a Photoreal Feature	Nominated
2015	Guardians of the Galaxy	Academy Award	Best Visual Effects	Nominated
2015	Guardians of the Galaxy	BAFTA Award	Best Special Visual Effects	Nominated
2015	Guardians of the Galaxy	VES Award	Outstanding Visual Effects in a Visual Effects-Driven Photoreal/Live Action Feature Motion Picture	Nominated
2015	Game of Thrones: Season 4	VES Award	Outstanding Compositing in a Photoreal/Live Action Broadcast Program	Won
2015	X-Men: Days of Future Past	Academy Award	Best Visual Effects	Nominated
2015	X-Men: Days of Future Past	BAFTA Award	Best Special Visual Effects	Nominated
2015	X-Men: Days of Future Past	VES Award	Outstanding Visual Effects in a Visual Effects-Driven Photoreal/Live Action Feature Motion Picture	Nominated
2015	Into the Woods	HPA Award	Outstanding Visual Effects - Feature Film	Nominated
2015	Maleficent	VES Award	Outstanding Visual Effects in a Visual Effects-Driven Photoreal/Live Action Feature Motion Picture	Nominated
2015	Maleficent	HPA Award	Outstanding Visual Effects - Feature Film	Nominated
2014	The Secret Life of Walter Mitty	VES Award	Outstanding Supporting Visual Effects in a Feature Motion Picture	Nominated
2014	The Lone Ranger	Academy Award	Best Visual Effects	Nominated
2014	The Lone Ranger	VES Award	Outstanding Supporting Visual Effects in a Feature Motion Picture	Won
2013	Prometheus	Academy Award	Best Visual Effects	Nominated
2013	Prometheus	BAFTA Award	Best Special Visual Effects	Nominated
2013	Prometheus	VES Award	Outstanding Visual Effects in a Visual Effects-Driven Feature Motion Picture	Nominated
2013	Life of Pi	Academy Award	Best Visual Effects	Won
2013	Life of Pi	BAFTA Award	Best Special Visual Effects	Won
2013	Life of Pi	VES Award	Outstanding Visual Effects in a Visual Effects-Driven Feature Motion Picture	Won
2012	Harry Potter and the Deathly Hallows: Part 2	Academy Award	Best Visual Effects	Nominated
2012	Harry Potter and the Deathly Hallows: Part 2	BAFTA Award	Best Special Visual Effects	Won
2012	Harry Potter and the Deathly Hallows: Part 2	VES Award	Outstanding Visual Effects in a Visual Effects-Driven Feature Motion Picture	Nominated
2012	Sherlock Holmes: A Game of Shadows	VES Award	Outstanding Supporting Visual Effects in a Feature Motion Picture	Nominated
2012	Pirates of the Caribbean: On Stranger Tides	VES Award	Outstanding Visual Effects in a Visual Effects Driven Feature Motion Picture	Nominated
2011	Harry Potter and the Deathly Hallows: Part 1	Academy Award	Best Visual Effects	Nominated
2011	Harry Potter and the Deathly Hallows: Part 1	BAFTA Award	Best Special Visual Effects	Nominated
2011	Robin Hood	VES Award	Outstanding Supporting Visual Effects in a Feature Motion Picture	Nominated
2010	Harry Potter and the Half Blood Prince	BAFTA Award	Best Special Visual Effects	Nominated
2009	The Chronicles of Narnia: Prince Caspian	VES Award	Outstanding Visual Effects in an Effects Driven Feature Motion Picture	Nominated
2009	The Chronicles of Narnia: Prince Caspian	VES Award	Outstanding Compositing in a Feature Motion Picture	Nominated
2007	Poseidon	Academy Award	Best Visual Effects	Nominated
2006	Kingdom of Heaven	VES Award	Outstanding Supporting Visual Effects in a Motion Picture	Won
2006	Harry Potter and the Goblet of Fire	VES Award	Outstanding Compositing in a Motion Picture	Nominated
2006	The Curse of the Were-Rabbit	Annie Award	Best Animated Effects	Won

== Filmography ==
=== Film ===
==== 1980s and 1990s ====
Year	Films	Studio(s) and Distributor(s)
1987	Out of Order	N/A
1995	Richard III	United Artists; Bayly/Paré Productions; British Screen; First Look International
1995	Hackers	United Artists; MGM/UA Distribution Co.
1995	GoldenEye	United Artists; MGM/UA Distribution Co. Eon Productions
1996	Muppet Treasure Island	Walt Disney Pictures; Jim Henson Productions
1996	Brassed Off	Miramax Films; Prominent Features; Channel Four Films; FilmFour Distributors
1996	Hamlet	Columbia Pictures; Castle Rock Entertainment
1997	Roseanna's Grave	Fine Line Features; Spelling Films; Warner Bros. (United States); PolyGram Filmed Entertainment (International)
1997	The Borrowers	PolyGram Filmed Entertainment; Working Title Films
1997	Tomorrow Never Dies	United Artists; MGM/UA Distribution Co. Eon Productions
1998	The Mask of Zorro	TriStar Pictures; Amblin Entertainment
1999	The World Is Not Enough	MGM/UA Distribution Co. Eon Productions

==== 2000s ====
Year	Films	Studio(s) and Distributor(s)
2000	High Fidelity	Touchstone Pictures; Working Title Films; Dogstar Films; New Crime Productions
2000	The Miracle Maker	Icon Entertainment International; Christmas Films; Sianel 4 Cymru; BBC Films; Icon Film Distribution (UK); S4C (Wales)
2000	Circus	Columbia Pictures; Circus Pictures; Film Development Corporation
2000	Snatch	Sony Pictures Releasing (under Screen Gems in the United States; under Columbia Pictures internationally)
2001	Enemy at the Gates	Paramount Pictures (United States); Pathé Distribution (France and United Kingdom); Constantin Film (Germany); Mandalay Pictures; Repérage Films
2001	Disco Pigs	Renaissance Films
2001	Late Night Shopping	SMG Productions; Scottish Screen; Glasgow Film Office; Film4 Productions
2001	Lara Croft: Tomb Raider	Paramount Pictures; Mutual Film Company; Lawrence Gordon Productions; Eidos Interactive
2001	High Heels and Low Lifes	Touchstone Pictures; Fragile Films; Buena Vista Pictures
2001	Kiss Kiss (Bang Bang)	D'Vision; Europa Filmes; GAGA Communications; Millennium Storm
2001	The Emperor's New Clothes	FilmFour; Redwave Films; Rai Cinema; Senator Film; Panorama Films; Mikado Film
2001	Gabriel & Me	Pathé; British Screen Productions; FilmFour Productions; Samuelson Films; UK Film Council; Isle of Man Film Commission; The Film Consortium
2001	Crush	FilmFour; UK Film Council; Senator Film; Industry Entertainment; Pipedream Pictures; Senator Film (Germany); FilmFour Distributors (United Kingdom); Sony Pictures Classics (United States)
2001	Dust	Pathé; Highlight Film; The Film Consortium; Fandango; Shadow Films; South Fork Pictures
2001	Mike Bassett: England Manager	Entertainment Film Distributors; Artists Independent Productions; Film Council; Hallmark Entertainment
2001	Harry Potter and the Philosopher's Stone	Warner Bros. Pictures; Heyday Films; 1492 Pictures
2002	Ali G Indahouse	Universal Pictures; Working Title Films; StudioCanal; Baby Cow Productions
2002	The Abduction Club	Pathé
2002	The Adventures of Pluto Nash	Warner Bros. Pictures; Castle Rock Entertainment; Village Roadshow Pictures
2002	Doctor Sleep	BBC Films
2002	The Heart of Me	Paramount Pictures; BBC Films
2002	28 Days Later	Fox Searchlight Pictures; DNA Films; UK Film Council
2002	Harry Potter and the Chamber of Secrets	Warner Bros. Pictures; Heyday Films; 1492 Pictures
2002	Die Another Day	Metro-Goldwyn-Mayer; Eon Productions; 20th Century Fox (International)
2002	Dot the i	Summit Entertainment (United States); Momentum Pictures (United Kingdom); Hispano Foxfilm (Spain)
2003	The Gathering	Dimension Films
2003	Ned Kelly	Universal Pictures; StudioCanal; Working Title Films; Australian Film Commission; Film Finance Corporation Australia; The Woss Group; Endymion Films
2003	Octane	Four Horseman Films; Random Harvest
2003	Lara Croft: Tomb Raider – The Cradle of Life	Paramount Pictures; Mutual Film Company; British Broadcasting Corporation (BBC); Tele München Gruppe; Toho-Towa; Lawrence Gordon Productions; Eidos Interactive
2003	Calendar Girls	Touchstone Pictures; Harbour Pictures
2003	The Medallion	TriStar Pictures; Screen Gems
2003	Blackball	Icon Entertainment International
2003	Cheeky	N/A
2003	Sylvia	BBC Films; UK Film Council; Capitol Films; Ruby Films; Icon Film Distribution (United Kingdom); Focus Features (United States)
2003	Big Fish	Columbia Pictures; Jinks/Cohen Company; The Zanuck Company
2004	Suzie Gold	Pathé
2004	Wimbledon	Universal Pictures; StudioCanal; Working Title Films; Mars Distribution (France)
2004	Ella Enchanted	Miramax Films; Blessington Film Productions; Jane Startz Productions
2004	Stage Beauty	Lions Gate Films; Qwerty Films; TriBeCa Productions; Ni European Film Produktions-GmbH & Co. KG; BBC Films
2004	Troy	Warner Bros. Pictures; Helena Productions; Latina Pictures; Radiant Productions; Plan B Entertainment; Nimar Studios
2004	Harry Potter and the Prisoner of Azkaban	Warner Bros. Pictures; Heyday Films; 1492 Pictures
2004	Around the World in 80 Days	Walt Disney Pictures (United States); Walden Media; Spanknyce Films; Mostow/Lieberman Productions; Entertainment Film Distributors (United Kingdom)
2004	Alien vs. Predator	20th Century Fox; Davis Entertainment; Brandywine Productions; Impact Pictures; Stillking Films
2004	Alexander	Warner Bros. Pictures (United States, United Kingdom and Italy); Constantin Film (Germany); Pathé Distribution (France); A-Film Distribution (Netherlands); Summit Entertainment (International); Intermedia Films; Ixtlan Productions; France 3 Cinéma; Pacific Film; Egmond Film & Television; IMF Internationale Medien und Film GmbH & Co. 3 Produktions KG
2005	Kingdom of Heaven	20th Century Fox; Scott Free Productions; Inside Track; Studio Babelsberg Motion Pictures GmbH
2005	Match Point	Icon Film Distribution (United Kingdom, Australia and New Zealand); DreamWorks Pictures (North America); BBC Films; Thema Production; Jada Productions
2005	Batman Begins	Warner Bros. Pictures; DC Comics; Legendary Pictures; Syncopy; Patalex III Productions
2005	Charlie and the Chocolate Factory	Warner Bros. Pictures; Village Roadshow Pictures; The Zanuck Company; Plan B Entertainment; Theobald Film Productions
2005	Corpse Bride	Warner Bros. Pictures; Tim Burton Productions; Laika; Patalex II Productions
2005	Wallace & Gromit: The Curse of the Were-Rabbit	DreamWorks Pictures; DreamWorks Animation; Aardman Animations
2005	Harry Potter and the Goblet of Fire	Warner Bros. Pictures; Heyday Films
2005	Isolation	N/A
2005	The River King	Kismet Film Company
2006	Renaissance	Pathé; Onyx Films; Millimages; LuxAnimation; Timefirm Limited; France 2 Cinéma; Odyssey Entertainment
2006	Opal Dream	Focus Features; Strand Releasing; BBC Films; UK Film Council; South Australian Film Corporation; Academy Features; Sherman Pictures
2006	Poseidon	Warner Bros. Pictures; Virtual Studios; Irwin Allen Productions; Next Entertainment; Radiant Productions; Synthesis Entertainment
2006	The Da Vinci Code	Columbia Pictures; Imagine Entertainment; Skylark Productions; Government of Malta
2006	The Wind That Shakes the Barley	Element Pictures (Ireland); Pathé Distribution (United Kingdom); Sixteen Films; Matador Pictures
2006	X-Men: The Last Stand	20th Century Fox; Marvel Entertainment; The Donners' Company; Dune Entertainment; Ingenious Film Partners
2006	Little Man	Columbia Pictures; Revolution Studios; Wayans Bros. Entertainment
2006	Stormbreaker	The Weinstein Company; Isle of Man Film; Samuelson Productions; UK Film Council; Entertainment Film Distributors (United Kingdom); Metro-Goldwyn-Mayer (United States); Sony Pictures Home Entertainment (Germany)
2006	Scoop	Focus Features; BBC Films; Ingenious Film Partners; Phoenix Wiley; Jelly Roll Productions
2006	The Banquet	Huayi Brothers; Media Asia Films
2006	Amazing Grace	Momentum Pictures (United Kingdom); Roadside Attractions; Samuel Goldwyn Films (United States); FourBoys Films; Walden Media; Bristol Bay Productions; Ingenious Film Partners
2006	Sixty Six	Universal Pictures; Working Title Films; StudioCanal; WT^{2} Productions; Ingenious Media
2006	Casino Royale	Metro-Goldwyn-Mayer; Eon Productions; Columbia Pictures
2006	Curse of the Golden Flower	Beijing New Picture Film Company; Edko Film
2007	The Good Night	Yari Film Group
2007	Sunshine	Fox Searchlight Pictures; DNA Films; UK Film Council; Ingenious Film Partners
2007	Harry Potter and the Order of the Phoenix	Warner Bros. Pictures; Heyday Films
2007	Elizabeth: The Golden Age	Universal Pictures; StudioCanal; Working Title Films
2007	1408	The Weinstein Company; Metro-Goldwyn-Mayer; Dimension Films; Di Bonaventura Pictures
2007	Fred Claus	Warner Bros. Pictures; Silver Pictures
2007	Sweeney Todd: The Demon Barber of Fleet Street	DreamWorks Pictures (United States); Warner Bros. Pictures (International); Parkes+MacDonald Productions; The Zanuck Company
2008	10,000 BC	Warner Bros. Pictures; Legendary Pictures; Centropolis Entertainment
2008	The Chronicles of Narnia: Prince Caspian	Walt Disney Pictures; Walden Media
2008	Quantum of Solace	Metro-Goldwyn-Mayer; Eon Productions; Columbia Pictures
2009	Watchmen	Warner Bros. Pictures (United States); Paramount Pictures (International); Legendary Pictures
2009	Angels & Demons	Columbia Pictures; Imagine Entertainment; Skylark Productions; Panorama Film Studios
2009	Night at the Museum: Battle of the Smithsonian	20th Century Fox; 21 Laps Entertainment; 1492 Pictures
2009	Harry Potter and the Half-Blood Prince	Warner Bros. Pictures; Heyday Films
2009	G.I. Joe: The Rise of Cobra	Paramount Pictures; Spyglass Entertainment; Hasbro; Di Bonaventura Pictures
2009	Dorian Gray	Alliance Films; UK Film Council; Ealing Studios
2009	Surrogates	Touchstone Pictures; Mandeville Films; Top Shelf Productions; Brownstone Productions; Wintergreen Productions

==== 2010s ====
Year	Films	Studio(s) and Distributor(s)
2010	Percy Jackson & the Olympians: The Lightning Thief	20th Century Fox; Fox 2000 Pictures; 1492 Pictures; Sunswept Entertainment; Dune Entertainment
2010	The Wolfman	Universal Pictures; Relativity Media; Stuber Pictures
2010	Clash of the Titans	Warner Bros. Pictures; Legendary Pictures; The Zanuck Company; Thunder Road Pictures
2010	Robin Hood	Universal Pictures; Imagine Entertainment; Relativity Media; Scott Free Productions
2010	Prince of Persia: The Sands of Time	Walt Disney Pictures; Jerry Bruckheimer Films
2010	The A-Team	20th Century Fox; Dune Entertainment; Top Cow Productions; Scott Free Productions
2010	Harry Potter and the Deathly Hallows – Part 1	Warner Bros. Pictures; Heyday Films
2010	The Chronicles of Narnia: The Voyage of the Dawn Treader	20th Century Fox; Walden Media
2011	Source Code	Summit Entertainment; The Mark Gordon Company; Vendôme Pictures
2011	Fast Five	Universal Pictures; Original Film; One Race Films
2011	Pirates of the Caribbean: On Stranger Tides	Walt Disney Pictures; Jerry Bruckheimer Films
2011	X-Men: First Class	20th Century Fox; Marvel Entertainment; The Donners' Company; Bad Hat Harry Productions; Dune Entertainment; Ingenious Film Partners
2011	Sucker Punch	Warner Bros. Pictures; Legendary Pictures; Cruel and Unusual Films
2011	Harry Potter and the Deathly Hallows – Part 2	Warner Bros. Pictures; Heyday Films
2011	Sherlock Holmes: A Game of Shadows	Warner Bros. Pictures; Village Roadshow Pictures; Silver Pictures; Wigram Productions
2012	Journey 2: The Mysterious Island	Warner Bros. Pictures; New Line Cinema; Walden Media; Contrafilm
2012	John Carter	Walt Disney Pictures
2012	Wrath of the Titans	Warner Bros. Pictures; Legendary Pictures; Thunder Road Pictures; Cott Productions; Furia de Titanes II A.I.E.
2012	Dark Shadows	Warner Bros. Pictures; Village Roadshow Pictures; Infinitum Nihil; GK Films; The Zanuck Company
2012	Prometheus	20th Century Fox; Scott Free Productions; Brandywine; Dune Entertainment
2012	Total Recall	Columbia Pictures; Original Film
2012	Skyfall	Metro-Goldwyn-Mayer; Eon Productions; Columbia Pictures
2012	Life of Pi	20th Century Fox; Fox 2000 Pictures; Dune Entertainment; Ingenious Media; Haishang Films
2013	Jack the Giant Slayer	Warner Bros. Pictures; New Line Cinema; Legendary Pictures; Original Film; Big Kid Pictures; Bad Hat Harry Productions
2013	Fast & Furious 6	Universal Pictures; Original Film; One Race Films; Dentsu
2013	Man of Steel	Warner Bros. Pictures; Legendary Pictures; DC Entertainment; Syncopy
2013	World War Z	Paramount Pictures; Skydance Productions; Hemisphere Media Capital; GK Films; Plan B Entertainment; 2DUX²
2013	The Lone Ranger	Walt Disney Pictures; Jerry Bruckheimer Films
2013	Red 2	Summit Entertainment; Di Bonaventura Pictures
2013	Percy Jackson: Sea of Monsters	20th Century Fox; Fox 2000 Pictures; Sunswept Entertainment; 1492 Pictures
2013	The Counselor	20th Century Fox; Scott Free Productions; Nick Wechsler Productions; Chockstone Pictures; Fox 2000 Pictures; Ingenious Media
2013	47 Ronin	Universal Pictures; H2F Entertainment; Mid Atlantic Films; Stuber Productions; Relativity Media
2013	The Secret Life of Walter Mitty	20th Century Fox; Samuel Goldwyn Films; Red Hour Productions; New Line Cinema; Big Screen Productions
2014	The Monuments Men	20th Century Fox; Columbia Pictures; Fox 2000 Pictures; Smokehouse Pictures; Studio Babelsberg
2014	300: Rise of an Empire	Warner Bros. Pictures; Legendary Pictures; Cruel and Unusual Films; Atmosphere Pictures; Hollywood Gang Productions
2014	The Amazing Spider-Man 2	Columbia Pictures; Marvel Entertainment; Arad Productions, Inc. Matt Tolmach Productions
2014	Godzilla	Warner Bros. Pictures; Legendary Pictures; Toho
2014	Maleficent	Walt Disney Pictures; Roth Films
2014	X-Men: Days of Future Past	20th Century Fox; Marvel Entertainment; Bad Hat Harry; The Donners' Company; Genre Films
2014	Edge of Tomorrow	Warner Bros. Pictures; Village Roadshow Pictures; RatPac-Dune Entertainment; 3 Arts Entertainment; Viz Productions
2014	Jersey Boys	Warner Bros. Pictures; RatPac-Dune Entertainment; GK Films; Malpaso Productions
2014	Into the Storm	Warner Bros. Pictures; New Line Cinema; Broken Road Productions; Village Roadshow Pictures
2014	Guardians of the Galaxy	Marvel Studios; Walt Disney Studios Motion Pictures
2014	The Hunger Games: Mockingjay – Part 1	Lionsgate; Studio Babelsberg AG; Color Force
2014	Exodus: Gods and Kings	20th Century Fox; Chernin Entertainment; Scott Free Productions; Babieka; Volcano Films
2014	Night at the Museum: Secret of the Tomb	20th Century Fox; 21 Laps Entertainment; 1492 Pictures
2014	Into the Woods	Walt Disney Pictures; Lucamar Productions; Marc Platt Productions
2014	American Sniper	Warner Bros. Pictures; Village Roadshow Pictures; RatPac-Dune Entertainment; Mad Chance Productions; 22nd & Indiana Pictures; Malpaso Productions
2015	Seventh Son	Universal Pictures; Legendary Pictures; Outlaw Sinema; Pendle Mountain Productions; Thunder Road Pictures; China Film Group
2015	Fifty Shades of Grey	Universal Pictures; Focus Features; Michael De Luca Productions; Trigger Street Productions
2015	Cinderella	Walt Disney Pictures; Kinberg Genre; Allison Shearmur Productions; Beagle Pug Films
2015	Furious 7	Universal Pictures; Original Film; One Race Films; China Film
2015	Terminator Genisys	Paramount Pictures; Skydance Productions; China Movie Media Group
2015	Fantastic Four	20th Century Fox; Marvel Entertainment; Marv Films; Kinberg Genre; Constantin Film; Hutch Parker Entertainment
2015	The Martian	20th Century Fox; Scott Free Productions; Kinberg Genre
2015	Pan	Warner Bros. Pictures; Berlanti Productions; RatPac-Dune Entertainment
2015	Goosebumps	Columbia Pictures; Sony Pictures Animation; LStar Capital; Village Roadshow Pictures; Original Film; Scholastic Entertainment
2015	Spectre	Metro-Goldwyn-Mayer; Eon Productions; Columbia Pictures
2015	The Hunger Games: Mockingjay – Part 2	Lionsgate; Studio Babelsberg AG; Color Force
2015	Victor Frankenstein	20th Century Fox; Davis Entertainment Company
2015	The Revenant	20th Century Fox; Regency Enterprises; New Regency; RatPac Entertainment; Anonymous Content; M Productions; Appian Way Productions
2016	The Finest Hours	Walt Disney Pictures; Whitaker Entertainment; Red Hawk Entertainment
2016	Zoolander 2	Paramount Pictures; Red Hour Productions; Scott Rudin Productions
2016	Batman v Superman: Dawn of Justice	Warner Bros. Pictures; DC Films; Atlas Entertainment; Cruel and Unusual Films
2016	The Jungle Book	Walt Disney Pictures; Fairview Entertainment
2016	X-Men: Apocalypse	20th Century Fox; Marvel Entertainment; Bad Hat Harry Productions; Kinberg Genre; The Donners' Company
2016	Independence Day: Resurgence	20th Century Fox; Centropolis Entertainment; Electric Entertainment
2016	The Legend of Tarzan	Warner Bros. Pictures; Village Roadshow Pictures; RatPac-Dune Entertainment; Jerry Weintraub Productions; Riche/Ludwig Productions; Beaglepug Films
2016	Ghostbusters	Columbia Pictures; Village Roadshow Pictures; Ghost Corps
2016	Suicide Squad	Warner Bros. Pictures; DC Films; Atlas Entertainment
2016	Miss Peregrine's Home for Peculiar Children	20th Century Fox; Chernin Entertainment; Tim Burton Productions
2016	Fantastic Beasts and Where to Find Them	Warner Bros. Pictures; Heyday Films
2016	Passengers	Columbia Pictures; Village Roadshow Pictures; LStar Capital; Wanda Pictures; Original Film; Company Films; Start Motion Pictures
2016	A Monster Calls	Universal Pictures (Spain); Entertainment One Films (United Kingdom and Australia); Focus Features (United States); Lionsgate (International); Participant Media; River Road Entertainment; Apaches Entertainment; Telecinco Cinema; Peliculas La Trini
2016	Sully	Warner Bros. Pictures; Village Roadshow Pictures; Flashlight Films; The Kennedy/Marshall Company; Malpaso Productions; Orange Corp
2017	Monster Trucks (visual effects and animation; with Mr. X)	Paramount Pictures; Paramount Animation; Nickelodeon Movies; Disruption Entertainment
2017	xXx: Return of Xander Cage	Paramount Pictures; Revolution Studios; One Race Films; Roth/Kirschenbaum Films
2017	Fifty Shades Darker	Universal Pictures; Perfect World Pictures; Michael De Luca Productions; Trigger Street Productions
2017	Ghost in the Shell	Paramount Pictures; Amblin Partners; DreamWorks Pictures; Arad Productions; Reliance Entertainment; Steven Paul Productions
2017	King Arthur: Legend of the Sword	Warner Bros. Pictures; Village Roadshow Pictures; Weed Road Pictures; Safehouse Pictures; Ritchie/Wigram Productions
2017	Pirates of the Caribbean: Dead Men Tell No Tales	Walt Disney Pictures; Jerry Bruckheimer Films
2017	Alien: Covenant	20th Century Fox; Brandywine Productions; Scott Free Productions
2017	Wonder Woman	Warner Bros. Pictures; DC Films; Atlas Entertainment; Cruel and Unusual Films
2017	The Mummy	Universal Pictures; Perfect World Pictures; Conspiracy Factory Productions; Sean Daniel Company; Secret Hideout; Chris Morgan Productions
2017	Transformers: The Last Knight	Paramount Pictures; Hasbro Films di Bonaventura Pictures; Huahua Media; Weying Galaxy; The H Collective
2017	The Dark Tower	Columbia Pictures; Imagine Entertainment; Weed Road Pictures; MRC
2017	Kingsman: The Golden Circle	20th Century Fox; Marv Films; Cloudy Productions
2017	The Mountain Between Us	20th Century Fox; Chernin Entertainment; Fox 2000 Pictures
2017	Blade Runner 2049	Warner Bros. Pictures (United States); Columbia Pictures (International); Alcon Media Group; Columbia Pictures; Bud Yorkin Productions; Torridon Films; 16:14 Entertainment; Thunderbird Entertainment; Scott Free Productions
2017	Murder on the Orient Express	20th Century Fox; Kinberg Genre; The Mark Gordon Company; Scott Free Productions
2017	Justice League	Warner Bros. Pictures; DC Films; Atlas Entertainment; Cruel and Unusual Films
2017	Jumanji: Welcome to the Jungle	Columbia Pictures; Matt Tolmach Productions; Seven Bucks Productions; Radar Pictures
2017	The Greatest Showman	20th Century Fox; Chernin Entertainment; Laurence Mark Productions
2017	All the Money in the World	Sony Pictures Releasing (United States and United Kingdom); STX International (International); TriStar Pictures; Imperative Entertainment; Scott Free Productions
2018	Fifty Shades Freed	Universal Pictures; Perfect World Pictures; Michael De Luca Productions; Trigger Street Productions
2018	A Wrinkle in Time	Walt Disney Pictures
2018	Skyscraper	Universal Pictures; Legendary Pictures; Flynn Picture Company; Seven Bucks Productions
2018	The Darkest Minds	20th Century Fox; 21 Laps Entertainment
2018	The Predator	20th Century Fox; Davis Entertainment
2018	Alpha	Columbia Pictures; Studio 8 The Picture Company
2018	Roma	Netflix; Espectáculos Fílmicos El Coyúl; Pimienta Films; Participant Media; Esperanto Filmoj
2018	The Nutcracker and the Four Realms	Walt Disney Pictures; The Mark Gordon Company
2018	Aquaman	Warner Bros. Pictures; DC Films; Peter Safran Productions
2019	Dumbo	Walt Disney Pictures; Tim Burton Productions; Infinite Detective Productions; Secret Machine Entertainment
2019	Dark Phoenix	20th Century Fox; Marvel Entertainment; Kinberg Genre
2019	Shazam!	Warner Bros. Pictures; New Line Cinema; DC Films; The Safran Company
2019	Pokémon Detective Pikachu	Warner Bros. Pictures; Legendary Pictures; The Pokémon Company
2019	Godzilla: King of the Monsters	Warner Bros. Pictures; Legendary Pictures; Toho; Wanda Qingdao Studios
2019	The Lion King	Walt Disney Pictures; Fairview Entertainment
2019	Dora and the Lost City of Gold	Paramount Pictures; Paramount Players; Nickelodeon Movies; Walden Media; Burr! Productions
2019	Ad Astra	20th Century Fox; Regency Enterprises; New Regency; Bona Film Group; Plan B Entertainment; Keep Your Head Productions; RT Features; MadRiver Pictures
2019	Noelle	Walt Disney Pictures; Disney+
2019	Lady and the Tramp	Walt Disney Pictures; Disney+ Taylor Made
2019	Cats	Universal Pictures; Perfect World Pictures; Working Title Films; Amblin Entertainment; Monumental Pictures; The Really Useful Group
2019	1917	Universal Pictures; DreamWorks Pictures; Reliance Entertainment; New Republic Pictures; Mogambo; Neal Street Productions; Amblin Partners

==== 2020s ====
Year	Films	Studio(s) and Distributor(s)
2020	Underwater	20th Century Fox; Chernin Entertainment
2020	Dolittle	Universal Pictures; Perfect World Pictures; Roth Films; Team Downey Productions
2020	Sonic the Hedgehog	Paramount Pictures; Sega Sammy Group; Original Film; Marza Animation Planet; Blur Studio
2020	The Call of the Wild	20th Century Studios; 3 Arts Entertainment
2020	The New Mutants	20th Century Studios; Marvel Entertainment; Kinberg Genre; Sunswept Entertainment
2020	Artemis Fowl	Walt Disney Pictures; Disney+ TriBeCa Productions; Marzano Films
2020	Love and Monsters	Paramount Pictures (United States); Netflix (International); 21 Laps Entertainment; Entertainment One
2020	The One and Only Ivan	Walt Disney Pictures; Disney+ Jolie Pas Productions
2021	Godzilla vs. Kong	Warner Bros. Pictures; Legendary Pictures; Toho
2021	Cruella	Walt Disney Pictures; Disney+ Marc Platt Productions; Gunn Films
2021	In the Heights	Warner Bros. Pictures; 5000 Broadway Productions; Barrio Grrrl! Productions; Likely Story; SGS Pictures; Endeavor Content
2021	Dune	Warner Bros. Pictures; Legendary Pictures
2021	The Last Duel	20th Century Studios; Scott Free Productions; Pearl Street Films
2021	Clifford the Big Red Dog	Paramount Pictures; Entertainment One; New Republic Pictures; The Kerner Entertainment Company; Scholastic Entertainment
2021	Ghostbusters: Afterlife	Columbia Pictures; Bron Creative; Ghost Corps; The Montecito Picture Company; Right of Way Films
2021	House of Gucci	Metro-Goldwyn-Mayer; Bron Creative; Scott Free Productions; United Artists Releasing (United States); Universal Pictures (International)
2021	West Side Story	20th Century Studios; Amblin Entertainment
2021	Spider-Man: No Way Home	Columbia Pictures; Marvel Studios; Pascal Pictures
2022	RRR	Pen Studios (North India); Lyca Productions (Tamil Nadu); KVN Productions (Karnataka); HR Pictures (Kerala); Variance Films; Sarigama Cinemas (United States); DVV Entertainment
2022	Sonic the Hedgehog 2	Paramount Pictures; Sega Sammy Group; Original Film; Marza Animation Planet; Blur Studio
2022	Chip 'n Dale: Rescue Rangers	Walt Disney Pictures; Disney+ Mandeville Films
2022	Top Gun: Maverick	Paramount Pictures; Skydance Media; Don Simpson/Jerry Bruckheimer Films
2022	The Princess	20th Century Studios; Original Film; Hulu (United States); Disney+ (International)
2022	Nope	Universal Pictures; Monkeypaw Productions
2022	Thirteen Lives	Metro-Goldwyn-Mayer; Bron Creative; Imagine Entertainment; Magnolia Mae; Storyteller Productions; United Artists Releasing; Amazon Studios
2022	Prey	20th Century Studios; Davis Entertainment; Lawrence Gordon Productions; Hulu (United States); Star+ (Latin America); Disney+ (International)
2022	Secret Headquarters	Paramount Pictures; Paramount+ Jerry Bruckheimer Films
2022	Pinocchio	Walt Disney Pictures; Disney+ Depth of Field Studios; ImageMovers
2022	Hocus Pocus 2	Walt Disney Pictures; Disney+ David Kirschner Productions
2022	Amsterdam	20th Century Studios; Regency Enterprises; New Regency; DreamCrew; Keep Your Head; Corazon Hayagriva
2022	Disenchanted	Walt Disney Pictures; Disney+ Josephson Entertainment; Andalasia Productions; Right Coast Productions
2022	Bhediya	Maddock Films; Jio Studios
2022	Pinocchio	Netflix; Netflix Animation; The Jim Henson Company; Pathé; ShadowMachine; Double Dare You Productions; Necropia Entertainment; El Taller del Chucho
2022	Bardo, False Chronicle of a Handful of Truths	Netflix; M Productions; Redrum
2022	The Pale Blue Eye	Netflix; Cross Creek Pictures; Streamline Global Group; Le Grisbi Productions
2023	Ant-Man and the Wasp: Quantumania	Marvel Studios; Walt Disney Studios Motion Pictures
2023	Murder Mystery 2	Happy Madison Productions; Echo Films; Mythology Entertainment; Vinson Films; Endgame Entertainment; Netflix
2023	Dungeons & Dragons: Honor Among Thieves	Paramount Pictures; Entertainment One; Wizards of the Coast
2023	Chupa	26th Street Pictures; Netflix
2023	Crater	Walt Disney Pictures; Disney+ 21 Laps Entertainment
2023	The Little Mermaid	Walt Disney Pictures; Lucamar Productions; Marc Platt Productions; 5000 Broadway Productions
2023	Transformers: Rise of the Beasts	Paramount Pictures; Skydance Media; Entertainment One; New Republic Pictures; Di Bonaventura Pictures; Bay Films
2023	The Last Voyage of the Demeter	Universal Pictures; DreamWorks Pictures; Reliance Entertainment; Storyworks Productions; Studio Babelsberg; Phoenix Pictures; Wise Owl Media
2023	Strays	Universal Pictures; Picturestart; Rabbit Hole Productions; Lord Miller Productions
2023	Landscape with Invisible Hand	Plan B Entertainment; Annapurna Pictures; Metro-Goldwyn-Mayer
2023	The Nun II	Warner Bros. Pictures; New Line Cinema; The Safran Company; Atomic Monster
2023	Leo	Seven Screen Studio
2023	Napoleon	Apple Studios; Columbia Pictures; Scott Free Productions
2023	Aquaman and the Lost Kingdom	Warner Bros. Pictures; DC Studios
2023	Ferrari	Neon; STXfilms
2024	Argylle	Apple Original Films; Marv Studios; Cloudy Productions; Universal Pictures
2024	Spaceman	Free Association; Tango Entertainment; Netflix
2024	Dune: Part Two	Warner Bros. Pictures; Legendary Pictures
2024	Atlas	Netflix; Safehouse Pictures; ASAP Entertainment; Nuyorican Productions; Berlanti-Schechter Films
2024	Kalki 2898 AD	Vyjayanthi Movies; AA Films; Annapurna Studios; Sri Lakshmi Movies; Wayfarer Films; KVN Productions
2024	Long Distance	Universal Pictures; DreamWorks Pictures; Automatik Entertainment; Six Foot Turkey Productions
2024	Indian 2	Lyca Productions; Red Giant Movies
2024	Emilia Pérez	Netflix; Pathé; Why Not Productions; Page 114; France 2 Cinéma; Saint Laurent Productions
2024	An Urban Allegory	Ad Vitam
2024	Mufasa: The Lion King	Walt Disney Pictures; Pastel Productions
2024	Kraven the Hunter	Columbia Pictures; Marvel Entertainment; Arad Productions; Matt Tolmach Productions
2025	Back in Action	Netflix; Chernin Entertainment; Exhibit A Good One
2025	Vidaamuyarchi	Red Giant Movies; Lyca Productions
2025	Snow White	Walt Disney Pictures; Marc Platt Productions
2025	Enzo	Ad Vitam; MK2 Films
2025	Colours of Time	StudioCanal; France 2 Cinéma
2025	Lilo & Stitch	Walt Disney Pictures; Rideback
2025	Mission: Impossible – The Final Reckoning	Paramount Pictures; Skydance Media; TC Productions
2025	Dracula	SND; EuropaCorp; TF1 Films Production
2025	Kantara: Chapter 1	Hombale Films
2025	The Great Arch	Le Pacte; Ex Nihilo; Zentropa Entertainment
2025	The Carpenter's Son	Le Pacte; Magnolia Pictures; Spacemaker; Cinenovo; Anonymous Content; Curious Gremlin; Saturn Films
2025	Resurrection	Huace Pictures; Dangmai Films; CG Cinéma; Arte France Cinéma; Obluda Films
2025	Troll 2	Netflix; Motion Blur
2025	Open Season 2	UGC; Starman Films; Curiosa Films; TF1 Films Production; Studio TF1
2026	Primate	Paramount Pictures
2026	The Gallerist	MountainA; Concordia Studio; Slow Pony; MRC
2026	Cold Storage	Samuel Goldwyn Films; StudioCanal; Pariah

==== Upcoming ====
Year	Films	Studio(s) and Distributor(s)
2026	Avengers: Doomsday †	Marvel Studios
2027	Varanasi †	Sri Durga Arts; Showing Business

=== Television series ===
- The Invisible Man (1984)
- The Vampyr: A Soap Opera (1992)
- Merlin (1998)
- Invasion: Earth (1998)
- The Strangerers (2000)
- Band of Brothers (2001)
- Colosseum: Rome's Arena of Death (2004)
- The Truth About Killer Dinosaurs (2005)
- Egypt (2005)
- Terry Pratchett's Hogfather (2006)
- Life in Cold Blood (2008)
- Terry Pratchett's The Colour of Magic (2008)
- Boardwalk Empire (2012)
- Game of Thrones (2014)
- Halo (2022)
- Prehistoric Planet (2022)
- Ms. Marvel (2022)
- The Walking Dead: Daryl Dixon (2023)
- Percy Jackson and the Olympians (2023)
- Néro the Assassin (2025)
- The Deal (2025)
- The Hunt (2026)

=== Music videos ===
- Portishead, "Sour Times" (1994)
- Spiritualized, "Come Together" (1998)
- Cevin Fisher, "Burning Up" (1998)
- Idlewild, "Actually It's Darkness" (2000)
- Tori Amos, "Strange Little Girl" (2001)
- Kylie Minogue, "Can't Get You Out of My Head" (2001)
- Basement Jaxx, "Where's Your Head At" (2001)
- Madonna, "Die Another Day" (2002)
- Moloko, "Familiar Feeling" (2003)
- Maksim, "Flight of the Bumblebee" (2003)
- Busted, "Sleeping with the Light On" (2003)
- I Am Kloot, "3 Feet Tall" (2003)
- Muse, "Time Is Running Out" (2003)
- Summer Matthews, "Little Miss Perfect" (2003)
- Dizzee Rascal, "Jus' a Rascal" (2003)
- Mark Joseph, "Bringing Back Those Memories" (2004)
- Basement Jaxx, "Plug It In" (2004)
- Brian McFadden, "Real to Me" (2004)
- Brian McFadden, "Irish Son" (2004)
- Beck, "E-Pro" (2005)
- The Dead 60s, "Riot Radio" (2005)
- Rob Thomas, "This Is How a Heart Breaks" (2005)
- LCD Soundsystem, "Tribulations" (2005)
- Test Icicles, "Circle. Square. Triangle" (2005)
- Sugababes, "Push the Button" (2005)
- Franz Ferdinand, "Walk Away" (2005)
- Massive Attack, "Live with Me" (2006)
- Laura Michelle Kelly, "There Was a Time" (2006)
- Richard Ashcroft, "Music Is Power" (2006)
- Serena-Maneesh, "Drain Cosmetics" (2006)
- The Sunshine Underground, "I Ain't Losing Any Sleep" (2006)
- Gomez, "See the World" (2006)
- Badly Drawn Boy, "Nothing's Going to Change" (2006)
- Razorlight, "America" (2006)
- The Killers, "Bones" (2006)
- Baxter Dury, "Francesca's Party" (2006)
- Klaxons, "Golden Skans" (2006)
- Bloc Party, "The Prayer" (2006)
- Kano, "Feel Free" (2007)
- These New Puritans, "Elvis" (2007)
- Depeche Mode, "Wrong" (2009)
- Coldplay, "Strawberry Swing" (2009)
- Depeche Mode, "Personal Jesus 2011" (2011)
- The Temper Trap, "Trembling Hands" (2012)
- Jessie Ware, "Wildest Moments" (2012)
- The Killers, "Miss Atomic Bomb" (2012)
- Flight Facilities, "Clair de Lune" (2012)
- Biffy Clyro, "Black Chandelier" (2012)
- Police Dog Hogan, "Devil Jim" (2012)
- Miles Kane, "Give Up" (2013)
- Bastille, "Pompeii" (2013)
- Bleached, "Next Stop" (2013)
- Gabrielle Aplin, "Panic Cord" (2013)
- Jamie Cullum, "Everything You Didn't Do" (2013)
- Miley Cyrus, "We Can't Stop" (2013)
- Jessie J, "It's My Party" (2013)
- Paloma Faith, "Can't Rely on You" (2014)
- Tiny Ruins, "Carriages" (2014)
- Chet Faker, "Gold" (2014)
- Shabazz Palaces, "#Cake" (2014)
- Flying Lotus featuring Kendrick Lamar, "Never Catch Me" (2014)
- Childish Gambino, "Telegraph Ave. ("Oakland" by Lloyd)" (2014)
- Benjamin Clementine, "Nemesis" (2015)
- Childish Gambino, "Sober" (2015)
- Taylor Swift, "Style" (2015)
- Earl Sweatshirt, "Grief" (2015)
- Brandon Flowers, "Lonely Town" (2015)
- Hyphen Hyphen, "Just Need Your Love" (2015)
- Mumford & Sons, "The Wolf" (2015)
- U2, "Song for Someone" (2015)
- Baauer, "Day Ones" (2016)
- Massive Attack, "Take It There" (2016)
- Michael Kiwanuka, "Black Man in a White World" (2016)
- Adele, "Send My Love (To Your New Lover)" (2016)
- Clean Bandit featuring Louisa Johnson, "Tears" (2016)
- Two Door Cinema Club, "Are We Ready? (Wreck)" (2016)
- Shawn Mendes, "Mercy" (2016)
- The Rolling Stones, "Ride Em' on Down" (2016)
- Coldplay, "Everglow" (2017)
- Michael Kiwanuka, "Cold Little Heart" (2017)
- A Tribe Called Quest, "Dis Generation" (2017)
- Kendrick Lamar, "Element" (2017)
- Mashrou' Leila, "Roman" (2017)
- Khalid, "Saved" (2017)
- Migos, "Stir Fry" (2018)
- Halsey, "Sorry" (2018)
- Niall Horan, "On the Loose" (2018)
- Sigrid, "Raw" (2018)
- Jack White, "Over and Over and Over" (2018)
- Leon Bridges, "Bad Bad News" (2018)
- Leon Bridges, "Bet Ain't Worth the Hand" (2018)
- Gaz Coombes, "Walk the Walk" (2018)
- Jess Glynne, "I'll Be There" (2018)
- Childish Gambino, "This Is America" (2018)
- Sam Smith, "Pray" (2018)
- Plan B, "Guess Again" (2018)
- Dita Von Teese, "A Musical Film" (2018)
- Nothing But Thieves, "Forever & Ever More" (2018)
