= Technicolor Group =

French entertainment services company (2021–2025)

Technicolor Group S.A.

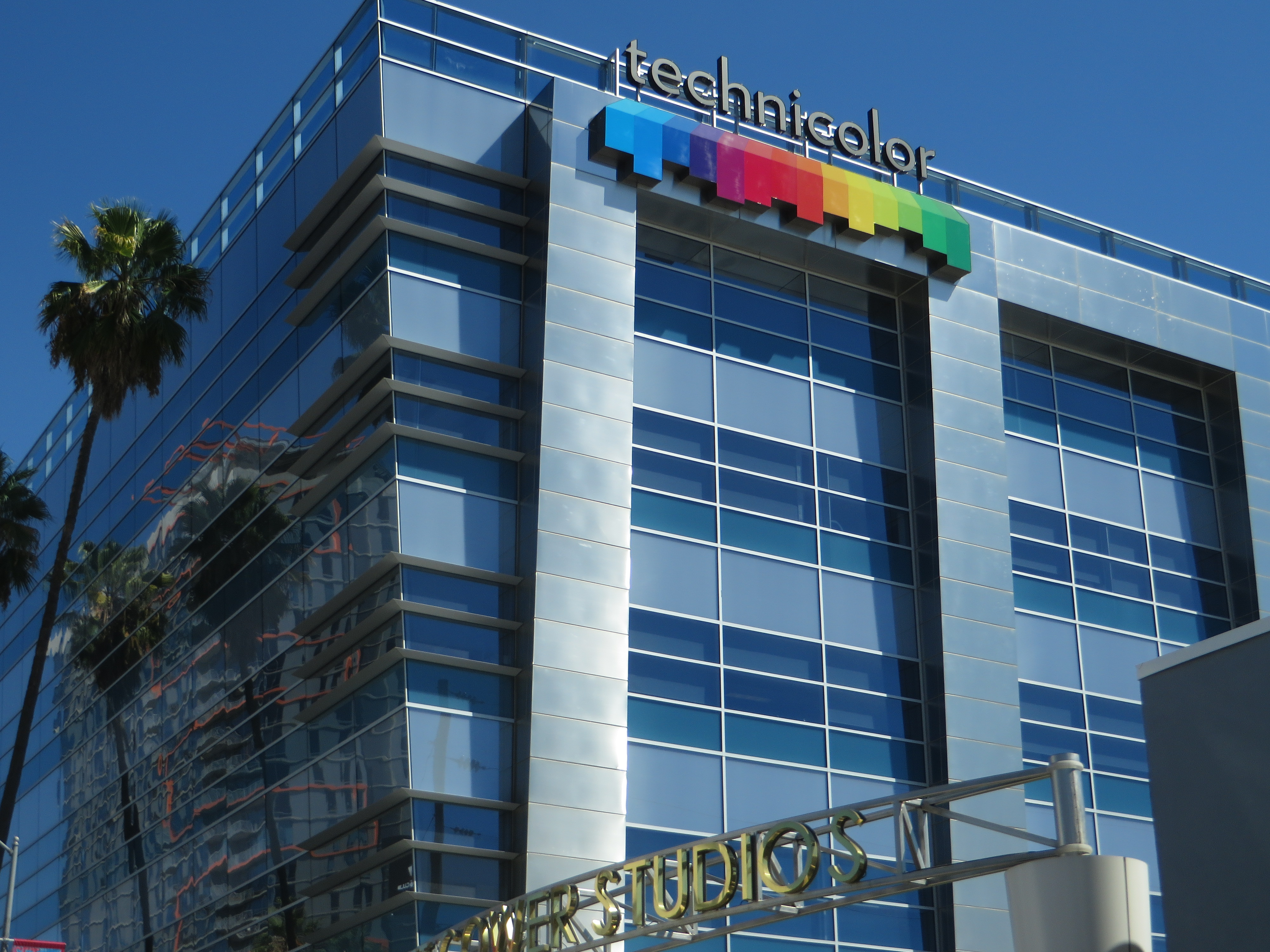
- Technicolor Production Services US HQ in Hollywood, Los Angeles, California in 2015.
- Formerly: Technicolor, Inc. (1915–2014); Technicolor Production Services (2014–2021); Technicolor Creative Studios (2021–2024)
- Type: Private
- Industry: Feature animation; Motion pictures; Visual effects
- Founded: 1915; 111 years ago
- Founder: Herbert Kalmus Daniel Comstock W. Burton Wescott
- Defunct: April 20, 2025; 18 months ago
- Headquarters: Paris, France
- Area served: Worldwide
- Key people: Caroline Parot (CEO); Christian Roberton (deputy CEO)
- Services: VFX; Animation; CGI; Virtual production
- Revenue: ▲€601 million (2021)
- Total assets: ▲€866 million (2021)
- Total equity: ▲€227 million (2021)
- Number of employees: 10,695 (2021)
- Divisions: Film; TV; Advertising; Animation; Games
- Subsidiaries: MPC; The Mill
- Website: www.technicolor.com

Technicolor Group S.A. (formerly Technicolor Production Services, then Technicolor Creative Studios) was a French company of American origin that is involved in visual effects, motion graphics and animation services for the entertainment, media and advertising industries. The company was part of the French Thomson group – which became Technicolor SA and later Vantiva – from 2001 to 2021, when Technicolor Production Services became independent, until it ceased operations in 2025.

Headquartered in Paris and Hollywood, it was the successor to the American company of the same name—which later became one of its subsidiaries—founded in 1914 in Boston by Herbert Kalmus, Daniel F. Comstock, and W. B. Westcott, and a pioneer of Technicolor technology. The company used to operate the visual effects, motion graphics and animation units for films, episodic series and video games under their subsidiaries: the Moving Picture Company (MPC), The Mill, Mikros Animation, and Technicolor Games.

As of February 2025, it was reported that the UK branch of Technicolor had appointed administrators, and the French company had entered receivership. The company's assets began to be sold off shortly after.

== History ==
=== Origins ===
The creation of Technicolor dates back to 1915 while the first version of said picture processing technology was patented and followed by the later versions in the several decades. The original company that owned the technology, Technicolor Motion Picture Corporation, was co-founded by the Massachusetts Institute of Technology (MIT) graduates Herbert Kalmus and Daniel Frost Comstock in 1915. The first commercial film that used Technicolor is The Gulf Between, which released on 13 September 1917, and was lost in a fire incident on 25 March 1961.

Technicolor was involved in ownership changes in several years. In 1982, MacAndrews & Forbes acquired Technicolor for $100 million, then sold it in 1988 to the British company Carlton Communications for $780 million.

=== 2001–2014: acquisition by the French company Thomson ===
In 2001, French-based media and electronics company Thomson Multimedia acquired Technicolor from Carlton for $2.1 billion.

On 1 February 2010, Thomson Multimedia changed its name to Technicolor SA, assuming the name of the picture processing technology which has been widely known for more than 95 years.

In November 2010, Technicolor SA announced the closure of its film processing plant in North Hollywood—a former Universal site for nearly forty years—in favor of its Montreal facility.

=== 2014–2021: multiple acquisitions and creation of Technicolor Production Services ===
In 2014, Technicolor SA consolidated its digital production, post-production, and digital distribution operations into a single division called Technicolor Production Services. The following year, Tim Sarnoff, president of Technicolor Production Services, announced the acquisition of the French studio OuiDo! Productions, which became Technicolor Animation Productions (TAP).

Prior to transforming the Technicolor Production Services division into its Technicolor Creative Studios unit, Technicolor SA sold its post-production unit to Streamland Media on 4 May 2021.

=== 2021–2024: the division becomes an independently public-listed company ===
On 19 May 2021, the Technicolor Production Services division of Technicolor SA, transformed into Technicolor Creative Studios to specifically "(focus) on the future of film, episodic, gaming, brand experiences and advertising". The unit has been led by Christian Roberton as the CEO, reporting to Technicolor SA CEO Richard Moat. With the formation of Technicolor Creative Studios, bringing the robust of studios such as The Mill, MPC, Mikros Animation, and Mr. X. In January 2022, Technicolor Creative Studios announced the integration of MPC Advertising under The Mill as well as the integration of MPC Film, MPC Episodic and Mr. X under the MPC brand.

On 24 February 2022, when Technicolor SA announced the full year 2021 results, the company also intended to list and spin-off 65% of Technicolor Creative Studios through a distribution-in-kind to Technicolor shareholders, while Technicolor will remain listed on Euronext Paris and post-spin off will retain up to 35% ownership of TCS. The business operations of Technicolor will divided into Technicolor Creative Studios and Technicolor's Connected Home and DVD services, which later known as Vantiva. On 27 September 2022, Technicolor Creative Studios became independently public-listed company, while Technicolor SA eventually rebranded as Vantiva, completed the spin-off process.

=== 2024–2025: Technicolor Group's decline ===
On 26 May 2024, Technicolor Creative Studios became Technicolor Group.

On 24 February 2025, a week after the company announced its plans to close its U.S. offices, the company filed for voluntary administration in the UK and began the receivership process in France.

On 1 March 2025, TransPerfect acquired Technicolor Games.

On 27 March 2025, Rodeo FX acquired most of Mikros Animation and select assets of Technicolor Canada.

On 28 March 2025, TransPerfect acquired the French assets of MPC, The Mill and Mikros Animation’s service work capabilities in Canada and France. On the same day, Boris Hertzog acquired the television division and French IPs of Mikros Animation, bringing OuiDo! Productions back after ten years.

As of 2026, the Technicolor trademark is owned by Tailsman Brands, Inc. (d/b/a Established Incorporated, stylized as established.inc).

== Operations ==
At the time of its closure, Technicolor Creative Studios had two distinct operating units:

- Moving Picture Company (MPC), a global leader in VFX, animation and visualization for over 45 years. MPC involved in several projects, such as Apple TV+ documentary series Prehistoric Planet and Disney's 2019 remake of The Lion King.
- The Mill, a global network of award-winning VFX artists and creative technologists with decades of experiences across the advertising and branding. The Mill involved in several projects, such as the posters of the Jordan Peele film Nope.
