= Singingfish =

- Company type: Subsidiary of AOL
- Industry: Internet Search
- Founded: 1999, acquired by Thomson SA in 2000, by AOL in 2003
- Defunct: Feb 2007
- Fate: Acquired
- Headquarters: Seattle, WA
- Number of employees: over 50
- Website: www.singingfish.com

Singingfish was an audio/video search engine that powered audio video search for Windows Media Player, WindowsMedia.com, RealOne/RealPlayer, Real Guide, AOL Search, Dogpile, Metacrawler and Singingfish.com, among others. Launched in 2000, it was one of the earliest and longest lived search engines dedicated to multimedia content. Acquired in 2003 by AOL, it was slowly folded into the AOL search offerings and all web hits from RMC TV to Singingfish were being redirected to AOL Video and as of February 2007 Singingfish had ceased to exist as a separate service.

Singingfish powered audio search continues to live on for the time being at AOL Search and other AOL properties. However, little if any development has been done since August 2006. Singingfish powered video search is no longer publicly available and is now being re-directed to AOL Video Search.

== Overview ==
Singingfish employed its own web crawler, Asterias, designed specifically to ferret out audio and video links across the web. In 2003 and 2004, Asterias discovered an average of about 50,000 new pieces of multimedia content a day. A proprietary system was used to process each of the discovered links, extracting metadata and then enhancing it prior to indexing as much multimedia content on the web has little or poor metadata. Many of the multimedia URLs used as seeds for Singingfish's crawlers and annotation engines came from cache logs from the NSF-funded National Laboratory for Applied Network Research (NLANR) IRCache Web Caching project.

== History ==
Singingfish was founded in mid-1999 by John DeRosa, Eric Rehm, Ken Berkun, and Mike Behlke.

By January 2000, it had grown to 17 employees. The group photo on the left was taken in Singingfish's first office on Seattle's Capitol Hill on January 24, 2000. From left to right: Robin Alexander, Scott Lee, Chris Wilkes, Eric Rehm, Shannon MacRae, Mike Behlke, Mark Lipsky, Linden Rhoads (a non-employee adviser), John Madsen, Charles Porter, Vas Sudanagunta, Paul Shannon, Austin Dahl, Chris Abajian and John DeRosa. Not pictured: Ken Berkun and Monte Hayward.

A public alpha version of the search service was unveiled at Streaming Media East in New York City in June 2000.

By the Fall of 2000, Singingfish had grown to over 50 employees. In November 2000, it was acquired by the French company Thomson multimedia (now Thomson SA). Singingfish announced its first customer, Zurich-based Internet AG, in December 2000. Singingfish Search first appeared on Internet AG's "Swiss Search" and Infospace's Dogpile and Metacrawler sites late in the summer of 2001.

By this time Singingfish was clearly the dominant multimedia search engine. No competitor indexed as much of the audio and video content available on the web or provided more relevant query results. In the fall of 2001, RealNetworks signed a deal with Singingfish for the latter to provide audio and video search for RealOne Player. In January 2003, Microsoft signed a similar deal, in this case to provide audio and video search for Windows Media Player and WindowsMedia.com.

Singingfish downsized dramatically under Thomson multimedia (Summer 2001) and then slowly continued to shrink in size through its acquisition by AOL in October 2003. However, Thomson multimedia continued to support research and development into multimedia metadata standards such as MPEG-7 that were incorporated into Singingfish technology.

Soon after acquiring Singingfish, AOL integrated its audio/video search service into AOL Search, adding yet another big-name to the stable of search products powered by Singingfish. As of August 2006, Singingfish continued to power multimedia search for both Microsoft and Real, and was being fully integrated into the AOL search and directed media business unit.

The last members of the Singingfish staff were laid off in December 2006. Since February 7, 2007 all web hits to Singingfish have been redirected to AOL Video.

== Features ==
=== Supported Formats ===
- MP3
- MPEG
- QuickTime
- Windows Media
- RealMedia
- Flash
- AVI

=== Partner feeds ===
The content providers below added their audio and video content to Singingfish's search index using regular feeds. In addition to providing high quality meta data to be indexed, these direct feeds also enabled Singingfish to produce highly current results for news related queries.

- Comedy Central
- MTV
- Nickelodeon
- TV Land
- Reuters
- BBC News
- CBS News
- E! News
- iFilm
- MSNBC
- NPR
- AtomFilms
- CNN
- Hollywood.com
- Like Television
- MarketWatch (Dow Jones & Company)
- The One Network
- RooTV
- AOL
