= List of films that received the Platinum Film =

This page is a list of films that received the Platinum Film since its introduction in 2001 by the Netherlands Film Festival and the Netherlands Film Fund. In 2001 and 2002, films from the Netherlands received the award once they had sold 200,000 tickets. From 2003 to date, the Platinum Film is awarded to films from the Netherlands once they have sold 400,000 tickets. This page shows, for both audience criteria, which films received the Platinum Film and how soon they received it after their releases.

In the following tables, the 'year' column contains the years in which the films received the Platinum Film, the '#' column contains the number of the Platinum Film, the 'film title' column contains the titles of the receiving films, the 'film release' column contains the dates on which the films were first released in the cinemas, and the 'Platinum Film' column contains the days when the Netherlands Film Festival and the Netherlands Film Fund announced that the receiving films reached the audience criterion of the Platinum Film.

When a film also received a Diamond Film, this award is listed in the 'other' column. The Diamond Film is awarded for 1,000,000 sold tickets since 2007. This award can be awarded in the same year as the Platinum Film or in a later year.

== 2001–2002 ==
Platinum Film for 200,000 tickets sold
Year	#	Film title	Film release	Platinum Film
2001	1	Costa!	1 March 2001	28 September 2001
2001	2	The Moving True Story of a Woman Ahead of Her Time	6 September 2001	7 November 2001
2001	3	The Discovery of Heaven	18 October 2001	15 November 2001
2002	4	Undercover Kitty	6 December 2001	8 January 2002
2002	5	Yes Nurse! No Nurse!	3 October 2002	24 October 2002
2002	6	Full Moon Party	10 October 2002	25 October 2002
2002	7	Peter Bell	17 November 2002	11 December 2002

== 2003–2025 ==
Platinum Film for 400,000 tickets sold
Year	#	Film title	Film release	Platinum Film	Other	Ref.
2003	8	Twin Sisters	12 December 2002	15 January 2003		
2003	9	De Schippers van de Kameleon	25 June 2003	5 August 2003		
2004	10	Peter Bell II: The Hunt For The Czar Crown	18 December 2003	8 January 2004		
2005	11	Tow Truck Pluck	18 November 2004	10 January 2005		
2005	12	Kameleon 2	29 June 2005	2 October 2005		
2006	13	Black Book	14 September 2006	5 October 2006	Diamond	
2007	14	Crusade in Jeans	16 November 2006	11 January 2007		
2007	15	Alles is Liefde	11 October 2007	28 October 2007	Diamond	
2008	16	Moordwijven	20 December 2007	14 February 2008		
2008	17	Anubis en het pad der 7 zonden	6 October 2008	26 October 2008		
2008	18	Winter in Wartime	27 October 2008	29 December 2008		
2009	19	The Storm	23 September 2009	9 October 2009		
2009	20	Stricken	26 November 2009	6 December 2009		
2010	21	Anubis en de wraak van Arghus	16 December 2009	25 February 2010		
2010	22	The Happy Housewife	15 April 2010	25 May 2010		
2010	23	New Kids Turbo	9 December 2010	19 December 2010		
2011	24	Dik Trom	24 November 2010	24 January 2011		
2011	25	Loft	16 December 2010	11 February 2011		
2011	26	Gooische Vrouwen	10 March 2011	18 March 2011		
2011	27	Sonny Boy	27 February 2011	8 April 2011		
2011	28	Nova Zembla	24 November 2011	15 December 2011		
2012	29	New Kids Nitro	8 December 2011	3 January 2012		
2012	30	Mees Kees	3 October 2012	29 October 2012		
2012	31	Family Way	22 November 2012	13 December 2012		
2013	32	Verliefd op Ibiza	28 January 2013	19 February 2013		
2013	33	Spijt!	20 June 2013	22 September 2013		
2013	34	De Nieuwe Wildernis	26 September 2013	28 October 2013		
2014	35	Mannenharten	25 November 2013	5 January 2014		
2014	36	Mees Kees op kamp	8 December 2013	5 January 2014		
2014	37	Soof	2 December 2013	7 January 2014		
2014	38	Tuscan Wedding	30 January 2014	23 February 2014		
2014	39	Gooische Vrouwen 2	4 December 2014	11 December 2014		
2014	40	Gift from the Heart	27 October 2014	24 December 2014		
2015	41	Mees Kees op de planken	3 December 2014	3 January 2015		
2015	42	Michiel de Ruyter	26 January 2015	23 February 2015		
2016	43	Bon Bini Holland	10 December 2015	4 Januari 2016		
2016	44	Rokjesdag	10 March 2016	8 June 2016		
2016	45	Soof 2	8 December 2016	28 December 2016		
2018	46	The Resistance Banker	8 March 2018	3 October 2018		
2018	47	Bon Bini Holland 2	13 December 2018	31 December 2018		
2019	48	Cuban Love	14 February 2019	28 April 2019		
2019	49	Penoza: The Final Chapter	28 November 2019	31 December 2019		
2020	50	April, May en June	19 December 2019	25 January 2020		
2020	51	The Marriage Escape	13 February 2020	9 March 2020		
2021	52	The Forgotten Battle	5 June 2021	9 August 2021		
2021	53	Luizenmoeder	28 July 2021	8 September 2021		
2022	54	Bon Bini Holland 3	30 June 2022	5 September 2022		
2022	55	Soof 3	15 September 2022	24 October 2022		
2023	56	De Tatta's	22 December 2022	10 January 2023		
2024	57	De Tatta's 2	14 December 2023	9 January 2024		
2024	58	Bon Bini: Bangkok Nights	20 December 2023	15 January 2024		
