= Bon Bini: Judeska in da House =

- Directed by: Jonathan Herman
- Written by: Jandino Asporaat; Michel Bonset; Maarten Swart; Anjali Taneji
- Produced by: Maarten Swart
- Starring: Jandino Asporaat; Arjan Ederveen
- Cinematography: Gregg Telussa
- Edited by: Jurriaan van Nimwegen
- Music by: Michiel Marsman
- Distributed by: WW Entertainment
- Release date: 10 December 2020
- Running time: 81 minutes
- Country: Netherlands
- Language: Dutch
- Box office: $3.5 million

Bon Bini: Judeska in da House is a 2020 Dutch comedy film produced by Maarten Swart and directed by Jonathan Herman. It stars Jandino Asporaat, as the character Judeska from the films Bon Bini Holland and Bon Bini Holland 2. Jandino originally wanted to make Bon Bini Holland 3 but after the COVID-19 pandemic happened, he instead decided to make a lower budget spin-off film in which one of his characters is forced to go into lockdown. The film premiered in Dutch theaters nationwide on December 10, 2020. It was the first Dutch film, after movie theatres reopened, to receive the Golden Film recognition for more than 100,000 visitors.

The film finished in 10th place in the list of best visited films in the Netherlands in 2021 with just over 279,000 visitors.
