= LOL: Last One Laughing UK =

- Genre: Comedy; Reality
- Created by: Hitoshi Matsumoto
- Presented by: Jimmy Carr; Roisin Conaty; Mel Giedroyc
- Theme music composer: Molecular Sound
- Country of origin: United Kingdom
- Original language: English
- No. of seasons: 2
- No. of episodes: 16

Production
- Executive producers: Richard Cohen; Peter Holmes; Ruth Philips
- Production locations: Sky Studios Elstree, Borehamwood, Hertfordshire
- Running time: 30–35 minutes
- Production companies: Initial; Zeppotron

Original release
- Network: Amazon Prime Video
- Release: 19 March 2025 – present

LOL: Last One Laughing UK (LOL UK) is a British comedy reality television series based on the Japanese show Documental. Hosted by Jimmy Carr and Roisin Conaty, with Mel Giedroyc later replacing Conaty, the show features ten comedians competing to make each other laugh without laughing themselves. The last contestant to keep a straight face wins the trophy.

== Premise ==
The show brings together ten comedians who must compete to remain expressionless while attempting to make their competitors laugh. Any contestant who laughs, smirks, or visibly reacts is given a warning, followed by elimination upon a second offence, though based on how much time remains, contestants may incur an automatic red card. The last remaining comedian is declared the winner and receives the LOL UK Trophy. If more than one comedian remains, the winner is decided by the comedian who caused the most laughs.

Additional gameplay mechanics include the "joker", a prepared performance that all contestants must watch by the person performing. The objective remains to make the contestants laugh. A joker can be played by the contestant at any time, or if instructed to do so by the host. Throughout the game, contestants participate in group games, head-to-heads at the direction of the host, and guests are inserted at random intervals who are not bound by the same rules in an attempt to make contestants laugh.

== Production ==
The UK version of LOL: Last One Laughing follows successful international adaptations of the format, including editions in Australia, Mexico, Germany, South Africa and Canada. It is produced by Banijay UK labels Initial and Zeppotron and is available exclusively on Amazon Prime Video. LOL: Last One Laughing Naija and LOL: Last One Laughing Philippines are the Nigerian and Filipino versions respectively.

A Halloween themed special of LOL UK, entitled Last One Laughing: Halloween, premiered on Amazon Prime Video on 23 October 2026, with a third season to be broadcast in 2027.

== Episodes ==
Series	Episodes	Originally released	
Series	Episodes	First released	Last released
1	6	19 March 2025	26 March 2025
2	6	18 March 2026	1 April 2026
HS	4	23 October 2026	30 October 2026

=== Series 1 (2025) ===
The participants were revealed in October 2024. The first four episodes were released on 19 March 2025, with the final two being released the following week on 26 March.

Nick Mohammed, Danny Dyer, and Alison Hammond made guest appearances.

==== Contestants and results ====
Contestant	Episode						Laughs
Contestant	1	2	3	4	5	6	Laughs
Bob Mortimer	Yellow card	SAFE	SAFE	SAFE	SAFE	WIN	3 (Note: He made Judi Love and Richard Ayoade receive a Yellow Card, and Ayoade receive a Red Card.)
Richard Ayoade	SAFE	SAFE	SAFE	SAFE	Yellow card	LOSE	1 (Note: He made Rob Beckett receive a Red Card.)
Rob Beckett	Yellow card	SAFE	SAFE	SAFE	SAFE	Red card	0
Lou Sanders	SAFE	SAFE	SAFE	SAFE	Yellow card	Red card	4 (Note: She made Bob Mortimer, Joe Wilkinson, and Joe Lycett receive a Yellow Card, and Wilkinson receive a Red Card.)
Harriet Kemsley	SAFE	SAFE	Yellow card	SAFE	SAFE	Red card	0
Daisy May Cooper	SAFE	SAFE	SAFE	SAFE	Yellow card Red card		0
Judi Love	SAFE	SAFE	SAFE	Yellow card Red card			1 (Note: She made Sara Pascoe receive a Yellow Card.)
Joe Wilkinson	Yellow card	Red card					1 (Note: He made Joe Lycett receive a Red Card.)
Joe Lycett	Yellow card	Red card					2 (Note: He made Rob Beckett receive a Yellow Card, and Sara Pascoe receive a Red Card.)
Sara Pascoe	Yellow card	Red card					0

(yellow card) Contestant received a yellow card
(red card) Contestant received a red card and was eliminated
SAFE Contestant did not receive a yellow or red card.
WIN Contestant was the winner of LOL: Last One Laughing UK.
LOSE Contestant was the runner-up of LOL: Last One Laughing UK.

==== Episodes ====
No. overall	No. in season	Title	Original release date
1	1	"Shake Your Tush"	19 March 2025
2	2	"Naughty Taughty"	19 March 2025
3	3	"Anyone for Ping Pong?"	19 March 2025
4	4	"Cracking Up"	19 March 2025
5	5	"Meats and Cheeses"	26 March 2025
6	6	"The Last Laugh"	26 March 2025

=== Series 2 (2026) ===
A second series was announced as having been commissioned in May 2025. The participants were revealed in August 2025. The first three episodes released on 18 March 2026; episodes four and five were released the following week on 25 March, and the finale was released on 1 April. As the winner of the first series, Bob Mortimer returned in series 2.

Richard Madeley, Natasia Demetriou, Ellie White, Johnny White Really-Really and Mark Silcox made guest appearances.

==== Contestants and results ====
Contestant	Episode						Laughs
Contestant	1	2	3	4	5	6	Laughs
David Mitchell	SAFE	SAFE	SAFE	SAFE	SAFE	WIN (Note: He won the show based on how many times he made his competitors laugh.)	2 (Note: He made Diane Morgan receive a Yellow Card (together with Bob Mortimer), and Mortimer receive a Red Card.)
Sam Campbell	SAFE	SAFE	SAFE	SAFE	SAFE	LOSE	1 (Note: He made Bob Mortimer receive a Yellow Card.)
Bob Mortimer	SAFE	Yellow card	SAFE	SAFE	SAFE	Red card	2 (Note: He made Diane Morgan receive a Yellow Card (together with David Mitchell) and a Red Card.)
Mel Giedroyc	SAFE	SAFE	SAFE	Yellow card	SAFE	Red card	0
Romesh Ranganathan	SAFE	SAFE	Yellow card	SAFE	Red card		2 (Note: He made Gbemisola Ikumelo and Alan Carr receive a Red Card.)
Diane Morgan	SAFE	Yellow card	SAFE	SAFE	Red card		2 (Note: She made Maisie Adam and Gbemisola Ikumelo receive a Yellow Card.)
Amy Gledhill	SAFE	SAFE	Yellow card	Red card			0
Maisie Adam	SAFE	Yellow card	SAFE	Red card			0
Alan Carr	SAFE	SAFE	SAFE	Yellow card Red card			3 (Note: He made Amy Gledhill and Romesh Ranganathan receive a Yellow Card, and Gbemisola Ikumelo receive a Red Card.)
Gbemisola Ikumelo	SAFE	Yellow card	SAFE	Red card			0

(yellow card) Contestant received a yellow card
(red card) Contestant received a red card and was eliminated
SAFE Contestant did not receive a yellow or red card.
WIN Contestant was the winner of LOL: Last One Laughing UK.
LOSE Contestant was the runner-up of LOL: Last One Laughing UK.

==== Episodes ====
No. overall	No. in season	Title	Original release date
7	1	"Breaking the Ice"	18 March 2026
8	2	"Imagine the Paperwork"	18 March 2026
9	3	"50 Ducks"	18 March 2026
10	4	"A Spare Thumb"	25 March 2026
11	5	"The Seagull and the Frankfurter"	25 March 2026
12	6	"Here Comes the Aeroplane"	1 April 2026

=== Halloween Special (2026) ===
A four-part Halloween special was announced on March 20, 2026, with the contestants being revealed on August 12. The special included an addition to the format; contestants now must not scream in addition to not laughing. The first three episodes were released on October 23, and the finale was released on October 30. Daisy May Cooper and Lou Sanders returned from the first series.

Charlie Cooper, Catherine Tate, Steve Pemberton, and series 2 winner David Mitchell made guest appearances.

==== Contestants and results ====
Contestant	Episode				Laughs/Screams
Contestant	1	2	3	4	Laughs/Screams
Daisy May Cooper	SAFE	Yellow card	SAFE	WIN	3 (Note: She made Lou Sanders receive a Yellow Card and Harriet Dyer and Reece Shearsmith receive a Red Card.)
Reece Shearsmith	SAFE	Yellow card	SAFE	LOSE	1 (Note: He made Jack Dee receive a Yellow Card.)
Phil Wang	Yellow card	SAFE	SAFE	Red card	1 (Note: He made Tom Allen receive a Yellow Card (together with Harriet Dyer).)
Harriet Dyer	SAFE	SAFE	Yellow card	Red card	2 (Note: She made Tom Allen receive a Yellow Card (together with Phil Wang) and Allen receive a Red Card.)
Tom Allen	SAFE	SAFE	Yellow card	Red card	1 (Note: He made Phil Wang receive a Yellow Card.)
Jack Dee	SAFE	Yellow card	Red card		1 (Note: He made Daisy May Cooper receive a Yellow Card.)
Lou Sanders	Yellow card	Red card			1 (Note: After being sent off, her Joker performance made Phil Wang receive a Red Card.)

(yellow card) Contestant received a yellow card
(red card) Contestant received a red card and was eliminated
SAFE Contestant did not receive a yellow or red card.
WIN Contestant was the winner of LOL: Last One Laughing UK.
LOSE Contestant was the runner-up of LOL: Last One Laughing UK.

==== Episodes ====
No. overall	No. in season	Title	Original release date
13	1	"A Tiny Mouse Scream"	23 October 2026
14	2	"I've Only Got Real Arms"	23 October 2026
15	3	"Tastes Like a Lava Lamp"	23 October 2026
16	4	"The Locker Room of Doom"	30 October 2026

=== Series 3 (2027) ===
A third series was announced on March 20, 2026, and will air sometime in 2027. The cast was announced on August 27. Richard Ayoade returns from the first series, and series 2 contestant Mel Giedroyc joins as co-host to facilitate Roisin Conaty’s participation as a contestant.

==== Contestants and results ====
Contestant	Episode						Laughs
Contestant	1	2	3	4	5	6	Laughs
Richard Ayoade							
Roisin Conaty							
Harry Hill							
Josh Jones							
Lee Mack							
Katherine Parkinson							
Jon Richardson							
Morgana Robinson							
Katherine Ryan							
Michelle de Swarte							

(yellow card) Contestant received a yellow card
(red card) Contestant received a red card and was eliminated
SAFE Contestant did not receive a yellow or red card.
WIN Contestant was the winner of LOL: Last One Laughing UK.
LOSE Contestant was the runner-up of LOL: Last One Laughing UK.

== Reception ==
LOL: Last One Laughing UK series 1 became the most watched show on Amazon Prime Video in the UK soon after its release, with the first three episodes being watched by well over 2 million viewers each according to Barb figures, thereby making it the streaming platform's biggest UK launch ever.

It received generally positive reviews from critics and audiences, with praise for its unique format and comedic talent but some criticism for pacing and repetition.

=== Awards and nominations ===
Year	Award	Category	Nominee	Result	Ref.
2026	British Academy Television Awards	Best Entertainment Programme	LOL: Last One Laughing UK	Won	
2026	British Academy Television Awards	Best Entertainment Performance	Bob Mortimer	Won	
2026	British Academy Television Awards	Memorable Moment	Bob Mortimer and Richard Ayoade's speed date	Nominated	
