= De Kameleon aan de ketting =

2021 Dutch film

- Theatrical release poster
- Directed by: Steven de Jong
- Written by: Steven de Jong; Dick van den Heuvel
- Produced by: Steven de Jong; Bennie de Jong
- Starring: Sens Gerritsen; Imme Gerritsen
- Cinematography: Edwin Donders
- Edited by: Tim Straver
- Distributed by: Just Film Distribution
- Release date: 27 June 2021
- Running time: 95 minutes
- Country: Netherlands
- Language: Dutch
- Box office: $426,603

De Kameleon aan de ketting is a Dutch family film. The film is based on the books of Hotze de Roos about the adventures of two identical twins and their boat, the opduwer De Kameleon. The film is a sequel to De Schippers van de Kameleon and Kameleon 2, being released 16 years after this last film. Director Steven de Jong returned for the sequel but the two main actors where re-cast. The film also has a significant role for Nando Liebrecht, an actor with Down syndrome. A reviewer for NRC Handelsblad called the main actors a sidecharacter in their own story.

The film premiered for the press and guests on June 27, 2021. Three days later, on June 30, 2021, the film premiered nationally to the general public.

== Reception ==
The film was the 15th most watched film at its opening weekend. After a run of 3 weeks it only grossed $188,361. After the film left the cinema, it closed with a profit of $426,603. Performing significantly worse than its predecessors, which earned 4.6 million and 2.7 million dollars.
