= Verveer =

Verveer may refer to:

- 3974 Verveer
- Melanne Verveer
- Roué Verveer
- Salomon Verveer
