= WW Entertainment =

Dutch film distributor

- Logo used since 2019
- Formerly: RCV Entertainment (1979–2009); Entertainment One Benelux (2009–2019)
- Type: Besloten vennootschap
- Industry: Film
- Founded: 1979; 47 years ago
- Founder: Otger Merckelbach
- Headquarters: Amsterdam, Netherlands
- Area served: Benelux
- Key people: Wilco Wolfers (CEO)
- Products: Motion pictures
- Owner: Independent (1976–1997); VNU (1997–2001); Sanoma (2001–2009); Entertainment One (2009–2019); Independent (2019–2024); Vuelta Group (2024–present)
- Website: wwentertainment.nl

WW Entertainment B.V. (formerly known as RCV Entertainment and Entertainment One Benelux) is a Dutch-based film distributor active in the Benelux.

== History ==
WW Entertainment was founded in 1979 by Otger Merckelbach as RCV Entertainment (Recorded Cinematographic Variety). The company focused mainly on distributing films on the home media market. In 1989, when the rental video market began to saturate, the company expanded into theatrical and television distribution, releasing titles from American film studios such as New Line Cinema, Miramax Films, Rysher Entertainment, Mandalay Entertainment and Cinergi Pictures.

In 1997, RCV was acquired by VNU. It was sold to Finnish media group Sanoma in 2001.

In 2007, Sanoma was looking to sell RCV. In 2008, Canadian entertainment company Entertainment One acquired the company, rebranding it to Entertainment One Benelux the following year.

In 2019, Wilco Wolfers and Caspar Wenckebach rebranded the company to WW Entertainment and acquired Entertainment One's remaining stake.

WW Entertainment was acquired by the pan-European distribution group Vuelta Group in October 2024.

== Filmography ==
=== Dutch films ===
==== As RCV Film Distribution/RCV Entertainment ====
Release date	Title	Notes
1990s
12 February 1998	Tate's Voyage	Produced by Motel Films and VPRO
26 March 1998	The Polish Bride	Produced by Motel Films, Ijswater Films and VPRO
2 July 1998	Temmink: The Ultimate Fight	Produced by Motel Films and VPRO
8 October 1998	FL 19,99	Produced by Motel Films, Isabella Films and VPRO
12 May 1999	Based on the Novel	Produced by DKP/Amsterdam
2000s
14 December 2000	The Black Meteor	
9 November 2000	De Omweg	
21 December 2000	Ajax: Hark the Herald Angel Sings	
15 February 2001	I Love You Too	
12 December 2002	Twin Sisters	Produced by IdTV Film, Chios Media, Samsa Film and NCRV
24 April 2003	Godforsaken	
3 August 2006	Doodeind	Theatrical co-distribution with Bridge Entertainment Group only
5 October 2006	Keep Off	Theatrical co-distribution with Bridge Entertainment Group only; produced by Shooting Star Filmcompany
14 December 2006	'n Beetje Verliefd	
15 March 2007	Dennis P.	
4 October 2007	Timboektoe	Theatrical co-distribution with Bridge Entertainment Group only; produced by Shooting Star Filmcompany
29 October 2009	The Dark House	produced by Column Film, KeyFilm and AVRO
13 December 2009	The Hell of '63	Theatrical co-distribution with Bridge Entertainment Group only;

==== As Entertainment One Benelux ====
Release date	Title	Notes
2010s
21 September 2011	The Gang of Oss	
2 October 2013	Chez Nous	Produced by BosBros, Ciné Cri de Coeur and Omroep NTR
12 February 2014	Sickos	Produced by BosBros and VARA
10 December 2015	Bon Bini Holland	
24 November 2016	De Zevende Hemel	
1 June 2017	Kill Switch	
13 December 2018	Bon Bini Holland 2	Produced by Kaap Holland Film
14 February 2019	Cuban Love	Produced by Johan Nijenhuis & Co

==== As WW Entertainment ====
Release date	Title	Notes
2020s
7 October 2020	De Grote Sinterklaasfilm	Produced by Messercola Drama
10 December 2020	Bon Bini: Judeska in da House	Produced by Kaap Holland Film
30 June 2022	Bon Bini Holland 3	Produced by Kaap Holland Film
7 November 2022	Casa Coco	Produced by Greenfield Film Productions and Messercola Drama
21 December 2022	Het Feest van Tante Rita	Produced by Bazarmedia Productions
16 March 2023	All Inclusive	Produced by Greenfield Film Productions and Talpa Network
20 December 2023	Bon Bini: Bangkok Nights	Produced by Kaap Holland Film

=== Non-Dutch films ===
==== 1990s ====
- Brainscan (1995)
- Dumb and Dumber (1995)
- Highlander III: The Sorcerer (1995)
- Judge Dredd (1995)
- The Mangler (1995)
- Renaissance Man (1995)
- Safe Passage (1995)
- What's Eating Gilbert Grape (1995)
- Angel Baby (1996)
- Angels and Insects (1996)
- The Brothers McMullen (1996)
- The Dentist (1996)
- The Doom Generation (1996)
- Fallen Angels (1996)
- The Fan (1996)
- Hellraiser: Bloodline (1996)
- It Takes Two (1996)
- Kingpin (1996)
- Last Man Standing (1996)
- Leaving Las Vegas (1996)
- The Long Kiss Goodnight (1996)
- Nixon (1996)
- Persuasion (1996)
- Secrets & Lies (1996)
- Up Close & Personal (1996)
- White Squall (1996)
- Basquiat (1997)
- Big Night (1997)
- Blood and Wine (1997)
- Bound (1997)
- Career Girls (1997)
- Cold Comfort Farm (1997)
- Cop Land (1997)
- The Crow: City of Angels (1997)
- Different for Girls (1997)
- Everyone Says I Love You (1997)
- The English Patient (1997)
- The Evening Star (1997)
- Forgotten Silver (1997)
- Head Above Water (1997)
- The Island of Dr. Moreau (1997)
- The Island on Bird Street (1997)
- Johns (1997)
- Kicking and Screaming (1997)
- Lost Highway (1997)
- Marvin's Room (1997)
- Meet Wally Sparks (1997)
- Microcosmos (1997)
- Mimic (1997)
- Private Parts (1997)
- Scream (1997)
- Set It Off (1997)
- Seven Years in Tibet (1997)
- Shadow Conspiracy (1997)
- Sling Blade (1997)
- A Smile Like Yours (1997)
- Turbulence (1997)
- Wilde (1997)
- Afterglow (1998)
- Air Bud (1998)
- Blade (1998)
- Chasing Amy (1998)
- Chinese Box (1998)
- Deep Rising (1998)
- Desperate Measures (1998)
- The End of Violence (1998)
- Freddie as F.R.O.7 (1998)
- Full Tilt Boogie (1998)
- Good Will Hunting (1998)
- Halloween H20: 20 Years Later (1998)
- The House of Yes (1998)
- Jackie Brown (1998)
- Kundun (1998)
- Life Is Beautiful (1998)
- Lost in Space (1998)
- Martha, Meet Frank, Daniel and Laurence (1998)
- Mrs Brown (1998)
- Mrs Dalloway (1998)
- Nightwatch (1998)
- Office Killer (1998)
- Primary Colors (1998)
- Ringmaster (1998)
- The Real Blonde (1998)
- Scream 2 (1998)
- She's So Lovely (1998)
- The Sweet Hereafter (1998)
- Switchback (1998)
- The Wings of the Dove (1998)
- 54 (1999)
- The Acid House (1999)
- American History X (1999)
- April (1999)
- The Astronaut's Wife (1999)
- Austin Powers: The Spy Who Shagged Me (1999)
- Bedrooms and Hallways (1999)
- Black Cat, White Cat (1999)
- Blast from the Past (1999)
- Bride of Chucky (1999)
- Buena Vista Social Club (1999)
- The Castle (1999)
- Central Station (1999)
- Children of Heaven (1999)
- Cookie's Fortune (1999)
- The Corruptor (1999)
- End of Days (1999)
- The Faculty (1999)
- Fear and Loathing in Las Vegas (1999)
- From Dusk till Dawn 2: Texas Blood Money (1999)
- Henry Fool (1999)
- Hideous Kinky (1999)
- In the Company of Men (1999)
- The Legend of 1900 (1999)
- Little Voice (1999)
- The Man with Rain in His Shoes (1999)
- Men with Guns (1999)
- The Mighty (1999)
- My Name Is Joe (1999)
- Next Stop Wonderland (1999)
- Outside Providence (1999)
- Pleasantville (1999)
- Pusher (1999)
- The Red Violin (1999)
- Regeneration (1999)
- Rounders (1999)
- She's All That (1999)
- A Simple Plan (1999)
- Smoke Signals (1999)
- Swing (1999)
- Three Seasons (1999)
- Velvet Goldmine (1999)
- Virus (1999)

==== 2000s ====
- American Psycho (2000)
- The Bachelor (2000)
- The Cell (2000)
- The Cider House Rules (2000)
- Down to You (2000)
- The Family Man (2000)
- Final Destination (2000)
- Frequency (2000)
- Holy Smoke! (2000)
- The Hurricane (2000)
- The Luzhin Defence (2000)
- Maybe Baby (2000)
- Music of the Heart (2000)
- Reindeer Games (2000)
- Ride with the Devil (2000)
- Scary Movie (2000)
- Scream 3 (2000)
- The Talented Mr. Ripley (2000)
- Teaching Mrs. Tingle (2000)
- Chocolat (2001)
- Dracula 2000 (2001)
- The House of Mirth (2000)
- The King Is Alive (2001)
- Lost Souls (2001)
- Love & Sex (2001)
- One Night at McCool's (2001)
- Rat Race (2001)
- Scary Movie 2 (2001)
- Serendipity (2001)
- Series 7: The Contenders (2001)
- The Shipping News (2001)
- Spy Kids (2001)
- Thirteen Days (2001)
- Traffic (2001)
- What Women Want (2001)
- The Yards (2001)
- The Accidental Spy (2002)
- Ali (2002)
- Austin Powers in Goldmember (2002)
- Birthday Girl (2002)
- Blade 2 (2002)
- Crossroads (2002)
- Crush (2002)
- Domestic Disturbance (2002)
- The Four Feathers (2002)
- Full Frontal (2002)
- Halloween: Resurrection (2002)
- Heaven (2002)
- I Am Sam (2002)
- Impostor (2002)
- Jay & Silent Bob Strike Back (2002)
- Kate & Leopold (2002)
- Life as a House (2002)
- On the Line (2002)
- Simone (2002)
- Tadpole (2002)
- We Were Soldiers (2002)
- Bulletproof Monk (2003)
- Chicago (2003)
- Confessions of a Dangerous Mind (2003)
- Dirty Pretty Things (2003)
- Dumb and Dumberer: When Harry Met Lloyd (2003)
- Equilibrium (2003)
- Final Destination 2 (2003)
- Freddy vs. Jason (2003)
- Frida (2003)
- Gangs of New York (2003)
- The Hours (2003)
- The In-Laws (2003)
- Jeepers Creepers 2 (2003)
- Kill Bill: Volume 1 (2003)
- A Man Apart (2003)
- My Boss's Daughter (2003)
- Naqoyqatsi (2003)
- Pinocchio (2003)
- Pokémon 4Ever (2003)
- Ripley's Game (2002)
- Scary Movie 3 (2003)
- Secondhand Lions (2003)
- Spy Kids 2: The Island of Lost Dreams (2003)
- They (2003)
- Till Human Voices Wake Us (2003)
- View from the Top (2003)
- Whale Rider (2003)
- Bad Santa (2004)
- Bright Young Things (2004)
- Cellular (2004)
- Dirty Dancing 2 (2004)
- Duplex (2004)
- Ella Enchanted (2004)
- Finding Neverland (2004)
- Harold & Kumar Go to White Castle (2004)
- Highwaymen (2004)
- Jersey Girl (2004)
- Kill Bill: Volume 2 (2004)
- Luther (2004)
- My Baby's Daddy (2004)
- The Notebook (2004)
- One Perfect Day (2004)
- The Prince & Me (2004)
- Seed of Chucky (2004)
- Sky Captain and the World of Tomorrow (2004)
- Spy Kids 3-D: Game Over (2004)
- Sylvia (2004)
- Zhou Yu's Train (2004)
- The Adventures of Sharkboy and Lavagirl (2005)
- The Amityville Horror (2005)
- Blade: Trinity (2005)
- The Brothers Grimm (2005)
- Cursed (2005)
- Domino (2005)
- Green Street (2005)
- A History of Violence (2005)
- House of Flying Daggers (2005)
- Ladies in Lavender (2005)
- Proof (2005)
- Sin City (2005)
- Son of the Mask (2005)
- The Dark (2006)
- Dreamer (2006)
- Fearless (2006)
- Final Destination 3 (2006)
- Hotel Rwanda (2006)
- Imagine Me & You (2006)
- The Lost City (2006)
- The New World (2006)
- Open Water 2: Adrift (2006)
- Perfume: The Story of a Murderer (2006)
- See No Evil (2006)
- She's the Man (2006)
- Silent Hill (2006)
- Snakes on a Plane (2006)
- Tara Road (2006)
- Texas Chainsaw Massacre: The Beginning (2006)
- Bratz (2007)
- Bridge to Terabithia (2007)
- Butterfly on a Wheel (2007)
- Curse of the Golden Flower (2007)
- Death at a Funeral (2007)
- Death Sentence (2007)
- Fracture (2007)
- The Golden Compass (2007)
- Hairspray (2007)
- It's a Boy Girl Thing (2007)
- Miss Potter (2007)
- Mr. Brooks (2007)
- Next (2007)
- Premonition (2007)
- Resident Evil: Extinction (2007)
- Tenacious D in the Pick of Destiny (2007)
- Trade (2007)
- Venus (2007)
- La Vie en Rose (2007)
- War (2007)
- Wedding Daze (2007)
- Bangkok Dangerous (2008)
- Blindness (2008)
- Disaster Movie (2008)
- Doomsday (2008)
- Eastern Promises (2008)
- The Flock (2008)
- Happy-Go-Lucky (2008)
- Harold & Kumar Escape from Guantanamo Bay (2008)
- How to Lose Friends & Alienate People (2008)
- Mr. Woodcock (2008)
- My Best Friend's Girl (2008)
- Over Her Dead Body (2008)
- Penelope (2008)
- Anywhere But Home (2008)
- Pride and Glory (2008)
- Rendition (2008)
- Reservation Road (2008)
- Run Fatboy Run (2008)
- The Secret of Moonacre (2008)
- Shine a Light (2008)
- The Strangers (2008)
- Then She Found Me (2008)
- Untraceable (2008)
- 17 Again (2009)
- Coco Before Chanel (2009)
- Defiance (2009)
- Drag Me to Hell (2009)
- Fame (2009)
- The Flight Before Christmas (2009)
- Ghosts of Girlfriends Past (2009)
- Last Chance Harvey (2009)
- Law Abiding Citizen (2009)
- Management (2009)
- My Bloody Valentine 3D (2009)
- New in Town (2009)
- Paranormal Activity (2009)
- The Private Lives of Pippa Lee (2009)
- Transporter 3 (2009)

==== 2010s ====
- 22 Bullets (2010)
- After.Life (2010)
- Balibo (2010)
- Buried (2010)
- Edge of Darkness (2010)
- Fair Game (2010)
- The Fourth Kind (2010)
- From Paris with Love (2010)
- The Imaginarium of Doctor Parnassus (2010)
- The Last Station (2010)
- Letters to Juliet (2010)
- Machete (2010)
- The Men Who Stare at Goats (2010)
- The Messenger (2010)
- The New Daughter (2010)
- Ondine (2010)
- Pope Joan (2010)
- Red (2010)
- Resident Evil: Afterlife (2010)
- Shanghai (2010)
- Solomon Kane (2010)
- StreetDance 3D (2010)
- When You're Strange (2010)
- 13 (2011)
- Apollo 18 (2011)
- Arthur 3: The War of the Two Worlds (2011)
- Barney's Version (2011)
- The Beaver (2011)
- Blitz (2011)
- Chalet Girl (2011)
- Dream House (2011)
- The Eagle (2011)
- Hoodwinked Too! Hood vs. Evil (2011)
- Insidious (2011)
- Killer Elite (2011)
- Larry Crowne (2011)
- The Lincoln Lawyer (2011)
- London Boulevard (2011)
- The Next Three Days (2011)
- The Rum Diary (2011)
- Shark Night (2011)
- Spy Kids: All the Time in the World (2011)
- Tinker Tailor Soldier Spy (2011)
- Tucker & Dale vs. Evil (2011)
- Warrior (2011)
- The Way Back (2011)
- Chernobyl Diaries (2012)
- The Cold Light of Day (2012)
- Dredd (2012)
- Hope Springs (2012)
- The Inbetweeners Movie (2012)
- Lockout (2012)
- Looper (2012)
- Man on a Ledge (2012)
- Marley (2012)
- The Possession (2012)
- Safe (2012)
- Sinister (2012)
- Trespass (2012)
- The Big Wedding (2013)
- Bullet to the Head (2013)
- The Butler (2013)
- Cosmopolis (2013)
- Dark Skies (2013)
- Dead Man Down (2013)
- The Fifth Estate (2013)
- A Haunted House (2013)
- I Give It a Year (2013)
- Jobs (2013)
- Justin and the Knights of Valour (2013)
- The Last Exorcism Part II (2013)
- Last Vegas (2013)
- The Mortal Instruments: City of Bones (2013)
- Now You See Me (2013)
- Paranoid (2013)
- Parker (2013)
- Red 2 (2013)
- Scary Movie 5 (2013)
- Silent Hill: Revelation (2013)
- Stolen (2013)
- Take This Waltz (2013)
- Texas Chainsaw 3D (2013)
- And So It Goes (2014)
- Begin Again (2014)
- The Best of Me (2014)
- Delivery Man (2014)
- Ender's Game (2014)
- The Expendables 3 (2014)
- The F Word (2014)
- A Haunted House 2 (2014)
- The Hundred-Foot Journey (2014)
- The Legend of Hercules (2014)
- Love, Rosie (2014)
- A Most Wanted Man (2014)
- Mr. Turner (2014)
- Need for Speed (2014)
- Pompeii (2014)
- The Railway Man (2014)
- Selma (2014)
- That Awkward Moment (2014)
- Venus in Fur (2014)
- Yves Saint Laurent (2014)
- American Ultra (2015)
- Regression (2015)
- Sinister 2 (2015)
- Solace (2015)
- Southpaw (2015)
- Tracers (2015)
- Un plus une (2015)
- The Woman in Black 2: Angel of Death (2015)
- Bad Santa 2 (2016)
- The BFG (2016)
- The Choice (2016)
- Eye in the Sky (2016)
- Free State of Jones (2016)
- The Girl on the Train (2016)
- The Hateful Eight (2016)
- The Light Between Oceans (2016)
- London Has Fallen (2016)
- Office Christmas Party (2016)
- Our Kind of Traitor (2016)
- Race (2016)
- Spotlight (2016)
- A Street Cat Named Bob (2016)
- 2:22 (2017)
- Detroit (2017)
- A Dog's Purpose (2017)
- The Post (2017)
- Thank You for Your Service (2017)
- The Commuter (2018)
- Entebbe (2018)
- The House with a Clock in Its Walls (2018)
- I Feel Pretty (2018)
- RBG (2018)
- Show Dogs (2018)
- Booksmart (2019)
- Captive State (2019)
- A Dog's Journey (2019)
- Green Book (2019)
- Hotel Mumbai (2019)
- If Beale Street Could Talk (2019)
- Judy (2019)
- Official Secrets (2019)
- On the Basis of Sex (2019)
- Scary Stories to Tell in the Dark (2019)
- A Shaun the Sheep Movie: Farmageddon (2019)
- Stan & Ollie (2019)
- Vice (2019)
- Wild Rose (2019)

==== 2020s ====
- 1917 (2020)
- Aquarela (2020)
- Dark Waters (2020)
- A Million Little Pieces (2020)
- Queen & Slim (2020)
- The War with Grandpa (2020)
- Don't Look Up (2021)
- The Hand of God (2021)
- The Lost Daughter (2021)
- The Power of the Dog (2021)
- Stillwater (2021)
- Bardo, False Chronicle of a Handful of Truths (2022)
- The Fabelmans (2022)
- Fireheart (2022)
- Good Luck to You, Leo Grande (2022)
- The Gray Man (2022)
- Guillermo del Toro's Pinocchio (2022)
- The Lost King (2022)
- Monster Family 2 (2022)
- White Noise (2022)
- The Last Voyage of the Demeter (2023)
- Maestro (2023)
- Nyad (2023)
- Society of the Snow (2023)
- Boneyard (2024)
- Bonhoeffer (2024)
- Bookworm (2024)
- The Crow (2024)
- Hit Man (2024)
- Nandor Fodor and the Talking Mongoose (2024)
- Radical (2024)
- Riff Raff (2024)
- The Surfer (2024)
- The Day the Earth Blew Up: A Looney Tunes Movie (2025)
- Flight Risk (2025)
- Frankenstein (2025)
- Grand Prix of Europe (2025)
- A House of Dynamite (2025)
- Last Breath (2025)
- Kayara (2025)
- Keeper (2025)
- The King of Kings (2025)
- KPop Demon Hunters (2025)
- Midas Man (2025)
- Sketch (2025)
- The Housemaid (2025)
- Kiss of the Spider Woman (2025)
- Magazine Dreams (2025)
- Cabrini (2025)
- Please Don't Feed the Children (2025)
- Here Now (2025)
- Rule Breakers (2025)
- The Last Rodeo (2025)
- Homestead (2025)
- Brave the Dark (2025)
- Grafted (2025)
- Jay Kelly (2025)
- Animal Farm (2026)
- By Any Means (2026)
- Charlie the Wonderdog (2026)
- David (2026)
- Dead of Winter (2026)
- Eternal Return (2026)
- The Fix (2026)
- Hellfire (2026)
- Paper Tiger (2026)
- Wicker (2026)
- Young Washington (2026)
