= Chez Nous (2013 film) =

2013 Dutch comedy film

- Directed by: Tim Oliehoek
- Written by: Frank Houtappels
- Produced by: Burny Bos; Ruud van der Heyde
- Starring: Alex Klaasen; Thomas Acda; Jack Wouterse; Isa Hoes; Achmed Akkabi; Tobias Nierop; Frans van Deursen; Tina de Bruin; Peter Faber; Frederik Brom; John Leddy
- Cinematography: Rolf Dekens
- Edited by: Bas Icke
- Music by: Fons Merkies
- Production companies: BosBros; Ciné Cri de Coeur; Omroep NTR
- Distributed by: Entertainment One Benelux
- Release date: 2 October 2013
- Countries: Netherlands; Belgium
- Language: Dutch
- Box office: $2.9 million

Chez Nous is a 2013 Dutch comedy film directed by Tim Oliehoek and written by Frank Houtappels, starring Alex Klaasen, Thomas Acda and Peter Faber.

The film was released on 2 October 2013 by Entertainment One Benelux.

== Cast ==
- Alex Klaasen as Bertus / Bertie
- Thomas Acda as Gijs
- Jack Wouterse as De Beer
- Isa Hoes as Hetty
- Achmed Akkabi as Rachid
- Tobias Nierop as Ramon
- Frans van Deursen as Onno
- Tina de Bruin as Babette
- Peter Faber as Helmer
- Frederik Brom as Peter Jan
- John Leddy as Adje

== Release ==
=== Critical response ===
The film received mixed reviews from critics.
