= Jandino Asporaat =

Dutch comedian (born 1981)

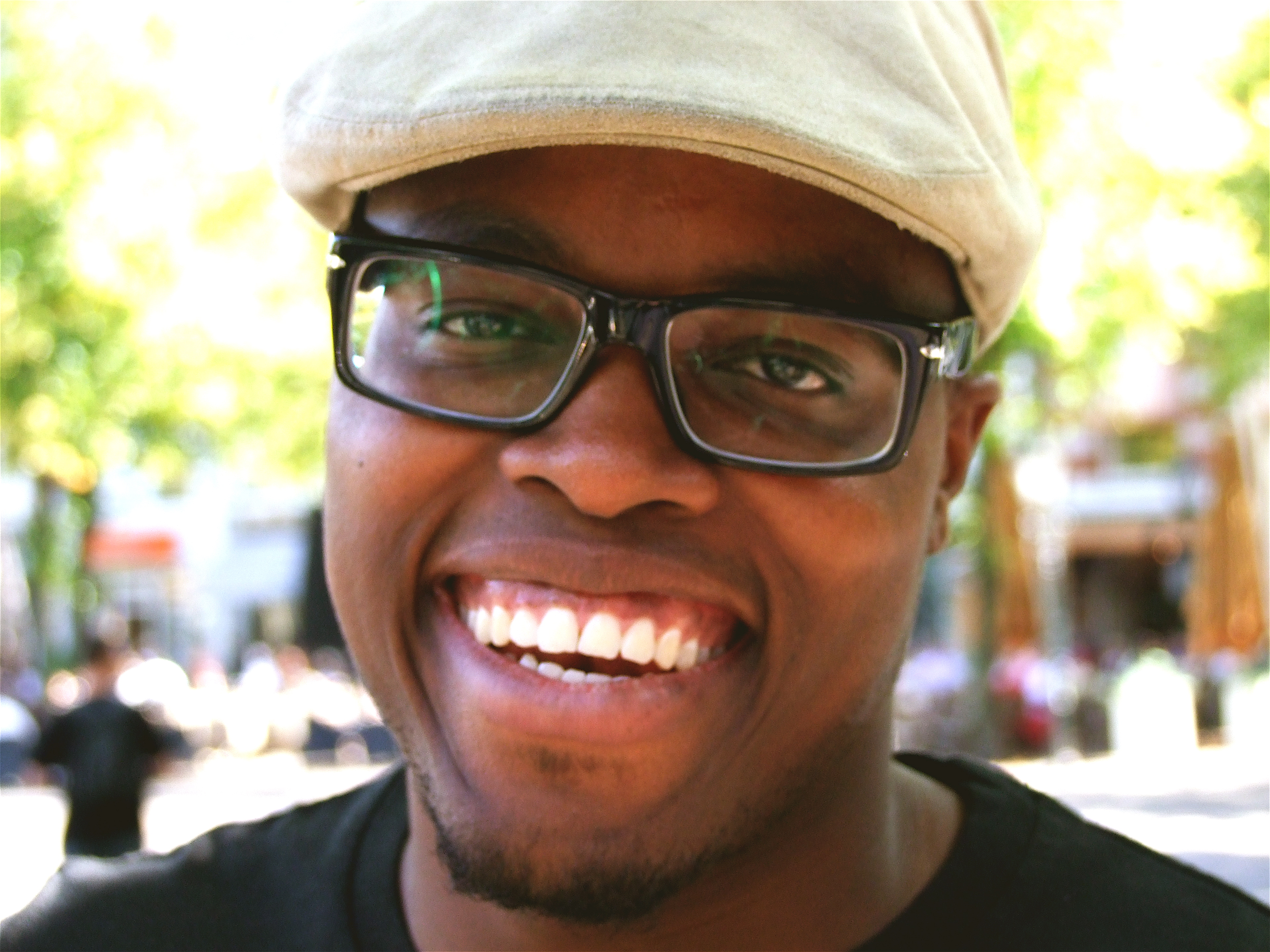
- Asporaat in 2009
- Born: Jandino Jullian Asporaat; 9 January 1981 (age 45); Willemstad, Netherlands Antilles
- Notable work: Comedy at Work; De Dino Show; Alles mag op zaterdag; Bon Bini Holland; Bon Bini Holland 2; Bon Bini: Judeska In Da House
- Spouses: Shirley Asporaat; (m. 2013–)
- Children: 3

Comedy career
- Years active: 2002 - Present
- Genres: Observational comedy; physical comedy; satire; cabaret; improvisational comedy; character comedy; sketch comedy; black comedy; blue comedy
- Subjects: Human sexuality; Caribbean culture; racism; race relations; self-deprecation
- Website: https://www.jandino.nl/

Jandino Jullian Asporaat (born 9 January 1981) is a Curaçaoan-Dutch stand-up comedian, actor, producer, writer, and voice actor.

== Early life ==
Asporaat was born in Willemstad, Curaçao in the former Netherlands Antilles where he grew up in the Buena Vista neighborhood together with his mother, three brothers and sister. His father lived elsewhere on the island with a different woman and paid no alimony. In 1992 he relocated to the Netherlands with his family, moving to Rotterdam, South Holland at age 11, where they settled in the IJsselmonde neighborhood on the city's south side, while his oldest brother remained on Curaçao. After completing his studies, Asporaat plied his trade as a painter before focusing on a career in stand-up comedy.

== Career ==
Asporaat began his professional career in comedy in 2002 with the Rotterdam-based theater group 'Young Stage' where he worked for two seasons. He acted in a variety of Dutch theater groups, such as the Ro-theater, Waterhuis and Rotjong. He also made a few television appearances, such as The Comedy Factory in 2007, in films such as Deuce Bigalow and Staatsgevaarlijk and in television commercials.

Outside of his career as a stand-up comedian, Asporaat is also a songwriter and journalist. As a writer he has had his work published in de Volkskrant and the NTR program 'Raymann is Laat'. On 1 November 2014, Asporaat opened his own clothing store in downtown Delft, South Holland. On 10 December 2015 he released his first self-produced full-length film "Bon Bini Holland" for which he won the "Golden film" award at the Dutch Golden and Platin Film awards ceremony. In July 2016, he played the voice of Snowball for the Dutch version of "The Secret Life of Pets".

=== Television career ===
In May 2007, Asporaat made an appearance in the television show De Lama's on BNN. In 2009, he was made part of the TV Lab team of NPS to produce a television plot in conjunction with the production company Men at Work for the new television series "Comedy at Work". He was joined by the likes of Sergio IJssel (from Flikken Maastricht), Shula Felomina (theatercomedy) and Alpha Oumar Barry (from Kwasi & Kwame: De Zwarte met het Witte Hart) where they released revamped old Dutch television shows.

In July 2011, Comedy at Work returned to Dutch television, this time one on NTR / Nederland 3. The comedians behind "Hulp, mijn man is John Williams", "Meisje, ik ben boos" and "De Nanny" returned once more with comedy, sketches and a new name "De Dino Show". The show was nominated for a Golden Rose (Rose d'Or) award in 2013 at the annual European festival for amusement television.

In 2013 and 2014, Asporaat was made a permanent panel member on RTL 4's "Wie ben ik?". Since 2014 he also hosts the weekly show "Alles mag op zaterdag". He has also hosted the Dutch version of the U.K. TV show "Dance, dance, dance" together with Chantal Janzen, and "Playback, je gek!" on RTL 4, both since 2015. He has also hosted his own talk show on RTL 5 since November 2015 titled "DINO", which is a spin-off of his successful "The Dino show" from NTR. Since 12 March 2016, he has co-hosted the show "Alles mag op zaterdag" together with Gordon and Gerard Joling.

He appeared in the 2024 season of the television show The Masked Singer.

=== Stand-up career ===
In 2005, he was in the final of the cabaret festival Cameretten. He was awarded the personality prize despite finishing in second place. His first full length theater presentation in which he head lined was "Antilliaanse Pot" which premiered in 2006 and was later released on DVD. His successful follow up "Buena Vista" followed two years later, where Asporaat reflects on his youth years and growing up on the island of Curaçao. His second feature was featured on Dutch television on channel Nederland 3 and was also later released on DVD. His third full feature "Laat ze maar komen" was released in 2011.

Around the same time of his National theater presentations, his collaborative tour with Roué Verveer, Murth Mossel and Howard Komproe began. The comedy group was known as the Caribbean Combo and toured the Netherlands, Suriname and the Dutch Caribbean islands during the Winter months of 2010 and 2011. On 7 June 2014, he became the first cabaret artist to perform at the newly opened Rotterdam Ahoy.

==== Cabaret playbill ====
- 2006: Antilliaanse pot
- 2008: Buena Vista
- 2010-2011: Laat ze maar komen
- 2010-2011: Caribbean Combo: Daar zal je ze hebben (with Roué Verveer, Howard Komproe and Murth Mossel)
- 2012: Caribbean Combo: Ze ZIJN er weer! (with Roué Verveer, Howard Komproe and Murth Mossel)
- 2013-2014: De revue
- 2015-2016: Hoe dan ook
- 2016: Gabbers (with Roue Verveer, Philippe Geubels and Guido Weijers)
- 2016: Van je familie moet je het hebben (farce, as Judeska)

== Personal life ==
In 2013, Asporaat married his childhood sweetheart Shirley. They have two children together and reside in Nieuwerkerk aan den IJssel.

Asporaat is also a known supporter of Dutch association football club Feyenoord from Rotterdam.

== Television ==
- De Lama's (2007)
- Comedy at Work (2008 to 2010)
- De Dino Show (host from 2011 to 2014)
- Wie ben ik? (host from 2013 to present)
- Alles mag op zaterdag (host from 2014 to present)
- Dance, dance, dance (Dutch version) (host from 2015 to present)
- Playback Je Gek (host from 2015 to present)
- DINO (host from 2015 to present)

== Filmography ==
Year	Title	Role	Notes
2008	Jandino Asporaat: Antilliaanse Pot	Himself	Stand-up film Also executive producer and writer
2011	Caribbean Combo: De kerstspecial	Himself	Stand-up film Also executive producer and writer
2011	Jandino Asporaat: Buena Vista	Himself	Stand-up film Also executive producer and writer
2011	Caribbean Combo: Daar zal je ze hebben	Himself	Stand-up film Also executive producer and writer
2012	Caribbean Combo: Ze zijn er weer!	Himself	Stand-up film Also executive producer and writer
2012	Glennis Grace Live in De HMH	Himself	
2013	Jandino Asporaat: Laat ze maar komen	Himself	Stand-up film Also executive producer and writer
2013	Thunder and the House of Magic	Kiki (Dutch version, voice)	
2015	Jandino Asporaat: De Revue	Himself	Stand-up film Also executive producer and writer
2015	Bon Bini Holland	Robertico Florentina; Judeska, Rajesh, gerrie and Sydney	Also executive producer and writer
2016	The Secret Life of Pets	Snowball (Dutch version, voice)	
2018	Bon Bini Holland 2		
2021	Bon Bini: Judeska In Da House		
2022	Bon Bini Holland 3		
2023	Bon Bini: Bangkok Nights		

== Discography ==
=== Singles ===
Songs that reached the Dutch Singles Top 40	Publication	Entrance	Top position	Weeks in list	Comments
Mijn liefde	2013	29-06-2013	1 (3 weeks)	29	Duet with Gerard Joling; Nr. 1 in Dutch Singles Top 100

== Awards and nominations ==
- Golden and Platin Film, Netherlands
  - won Golden film (2015) for the film Bon Bini Holland
- Netherlands Film Festival: 1
  - won Best film (2016) for the film Bon Bini Holland
