= Documental =

Prime Video international comedy TV format

- Also known as: Hitoshi Matsumoto Presents Documental
- Genre: Comedy reality
- Created by: Hitoshi Matsumoto
- Presented by: Hitoshi Matsumoto
- Country of origin: Japan
- Original language: Japanese
- No. of series: 13

Production
- Running time: 40–60 minutes
- Production companies: YD Creation; FANY Studio (season 13 – present)

Original release
- Network: Amazon Prime Video
- Release: 30 November 2016 – 22 December 2023

Documental (Japanese: ドキュメンタル) is a Japanese comedy show created and hosted by Hitoshi Matsumoto that has been airing on Amazon Prime Video since 30 November 2016.

It has several international adaptations, many of which are marketed under the name Last One Laughing.

== Format ==
Ten comedians stay in a living-room-style studio with hidden cameras for a few hours (usually six). During this time, they must try to make their opponents laugh in any way and by any means, while not reacting to their opponents’ attempts to make them break.

At the first laugh, the competitor is cautioned (yellow-carded), while a second eliminates the player from the game (red-carded). However, large infractions may be given an automatic red card. Eliminated players join the host in the observation room, but may return as an external challenger to the remaining contestants. The comedians can also be eliminated if they are not active enough. The only way to communicate with the outside is a telephone controlled by the host.

== Seasons ==
| Season | Premiere | Finale | Winner | Note |
|---|---|---|---|---|
| 1 | 30 November 2016 | 21 December 2016 | Spoil None (Three-way tie) | Before tie-break rule was introduced |
| 2 | 26 April 2017 | 24 May 2017 | Spoil Eiji Kotōge | |
| 3 | 2 August 2017 | 30 August 2017 | Spoil: Yamamoto Keiichi | |
| 4 | 1 December 2017 | 29 December 2017 | Spoil Cookie (Yasei Bakudan) | |
| 5 | 20 April 2018 | 18 May 2018 | Spoil Hollywood Zakoshisyoh | |
| 6 | 30 November 2018 | 7 December 2018 | Spoil: Yuriyan Retriever | |
| 7 | 26 April 2019 | 23 May 2019 | Spoil Hollywood Zakoshisyoh | |
| 8 | 21 August 2020 | 18 September 2020 | Spoil Cookie (Yasei Bakudan) | |
| 9 | 26 February 2021 | | Spoil Kubota Kazunobu | |
| 10 | 3 December 2021 | | Spoil Hollywood Zakoshisyoh | |
| 11 | 17 August 2022 | | Spoil Takanohana Kōji | |
| 12 | 26 May 2023 | | Spoil Choshu Riki | |
| 13 | 22 December 2023 | | Spoil Football Hour (Terumoto Goto & Nozomu Iwao) | |

== International versions ==
| Country | Name | Language | Host(s) | TV station | Premiere | Finale |
|---|---|---|---|---|---|---|
| Albania | Qesh Mirë... Kush Qesh i Fundit | Albanian | Salsano Rrapi; Xhemi Shehu | Top Channel | 8 March 2022 | 26 April 2022 |
| Algeria | تضحك تخرج; You laugh, you're out | Arabic | Khaled Benaissa | Echourouk TV | 16 October 2025 | present |
| Argentina | LOL: Last One Laughing Argentina | Spanish | Susana Giménez; Grego Rossello | Amazon Prime Video | 17 March 2023 | present |
| Australia | LOL: Last One Laughing Australia | English | Rebel Wilson | Amazon Prime Video | 18 June 2020 | 3 July 2020 |
| Brazil | LOL: Se Rir, Já Era | Portuguese | Fábio Porchat (season 5); Former: Tom Cavalcante (seasons 1–4); Clarice Falcão (season 1); Gkay (season 2); Fabiana Karla (season 3); Júlia Rabelo (season 4) | Amazon Prime Video | 3 December 2021 | present |
| Canada | LOL: Last One Laughing Canada | English | Jay Baruchel | Amazon Prime Video | 18 February 2022 | 4 March 2022 |
| Canada | LOL: Qui Rira Le Dernier? | French | Patrick Huard | Amazon Prime Video | 6 January 2023 | present |
| Colombia | LOL: Last One Laughing Colombia | Spanish | Jorge Enrique Abello | Amazon Prime Video | 11 August 2023 | present |
| Denmark | LOL: Den der ler sidst | Danish | Sofie Linde | Amazon Prime Video | 29 December 2023 | present |
| France | LOL: Qui rit, sort! | French | Philippe Lacheau | Amazon Prime Video | 22 April 2021 | present |
| France | LOL: Qui (c)rie, sort! | French | Philippe Lacheau | Amazon Prime Video | 26 October 2023 | present |
| France | LOL: IRL | French | Philippe Lacheau | Amazon Prime Video | 2024 | present |
| Germany | LOL: Last One Laughing Germany | German | Carolin Kebekus (season 8–); Former: Michael "Bully" Herbig (season 1-6); Hape Kerkeling (season 7) | Amazon Prime Video | 1 April 2021 | present |
| Germany | LOL Next | German | Hazel Brugger | Amazon Prime Video | 9 September 2026 | present |
| Iceland | Bannað að hlæja | Icelandic | Auðunn Blöndal | Sýn | 15 November 2024 | present |
| India | LOL: Hasse Toh Phasse | Hindi | Boman Irani; Arshad Warsi | Amazon Prime Video | 28 April 2021 | 30 April 2021 |
| India | LOL: Enga Siri Paapom | Tamil | Vivek; Mirchi Siva | Amazon Prime Video | 26 August 2021 | 27 August 2021 |
| Indonesia | LOL: Last One Laughing Indonesia | Indonesian | Pandji Pragiwaksono | Amazon Prime Video | 11 July 2024 | present |
| Iran | Joker | Farsi | Siamak Ansari; Ehsan Alikhani | Filimo | 27 November 2021 | present |
| Iran | Joker 2: Twenty-First Floor | Farsi | Ehsan Alikhani | Filimo | 30 June 2024 | Present |
| Ireland | LOL: Last One Laughing Ireland | English | Graham Norton | Amazon Prime Video | 19 January 2024 | present |
| Italy | LOL - Chi ride è fuori | Italian | Fedez; Mara Maionchi; Frank Matano | Amazon Prime Video | 26 February 2021 | present |
| Japan | Documental | Japanese | Hitoshi Matsumoto | Amazon Prime Video | 30 November 2016 | 22 December 2023 |
| Mexico | LOL: Last One Laughing | Spanish | Eugenio Derbez | Amazon Prime Video | 13 December 2018 | present |
| Mexico | LOL Talent Show: Mexico | Spanish | Eugenio Derbez; Michelle Rodríguez; Capi Pérez; Adal Ramones | Amazon Prime Video | 14 January 2026 | present |
| Netherlands | LOL: Last One Laughing Netherlands | Dutch | Philippe Geubels; Jeroom Snelders | Amazon Prime Video | 20 January 2023 | present |
| Nigeria | LOL: Last One Laughing Naija | English | Basketmouth | Amazon Prime Video | 14 July 2023 | present |
| Norway | LOL: Den som ler sist Norge | Norwegian | Sigrid Bonde Tusvik | Amazon Prime Video | 29 December 2023 | present |
| Philippines | LOL: Last One Laughing Philippines | Filipino, English | Vice Ganda | Amazon Prime Video | 4 July 2024 | present |
| Poland | LOL: Kto się śmieje ostatni | Polish | Cezary Pazura | Amazon Prime Video | 14 April 2023 | present |
| Russia | The Big Show | Russian | Azamat Musagaliev | YouTube; VK | 15 February 2023 | present |
| South Africa | LOL: Last One Laughing South Africa | English | Trevor Noah | Amazon Prime Video | 13 February 2024 | present |
| Spain | LOL: Si te ríes, pierdes | Spanish | Santiago Segura; Silvia Abril; Carolina Iglesias | Amazon Prime Video | 13 May 2021 | present |
| Sweden | LOL: Skrattar bäst som skrattar sist | Swedish | Eva Röse | Amazon Prime Video | 28 December 2022 | present |
| Thailand | LOL: Last One Laughing Thailand | Thai | Siwat Chotchaicharin; Pramote Pathan | Amazon Prime Video | 4 July 2024 | present |
| Tunisia | برنامج تضحك تخرج; Qui rit qui sort Tunisie | Arabic | Sami Fehri | El Hiwar Et Tounsi | 11 March 2024 | present |
| Turkey | Demet Akbağ ile Güldürme Beni | Turkish | Demet Akbağ; Şahin Irmak | Show TV | 4 July 2022 | 10 August 2022 |
| United Kingdom | LOL: Last One Laughing UK | English | Jimmy Carr; Mel Giedroyc (series 3); Former: Roisin Conaty (series 1–2) | Amazon Prime Video | 20 March 2025 | present |
| United States | TBA | English | Nick Kroll | Amazon Prime Video | TBA | TBA |
