= De Schippers van de Kameleon =

2003 film

- Theatrical release poster
- Directed by: Steven de Jong; Marc Willard
- Written by: Hotze de Roos (novel); Jean Ummels (screenplay)
- Starring: Koen van der Donk; Jos van der Donk; Maarten Spanjer; Saar Koningsberger; Joep Sertons
- Cinematography: François Perrier; Anton Stoelwinder
- Edited by: Paul Bruisjens
- Music by: Ronald Schilperoort
- Production companies: Bridge Pictures; Katholieke Radio Omroep
- Distributed by: Independent Films
- Release date: 25 June 2003
- Running time: 100 minutes
- Country: Netherlands
- Language: Dutch
- Box office: $4,649,322

De Schippers van de Kameleon (2003) is a Dutch family film with main characters identical twins Koen van der Donk (Hielke Klinkhamer) and Jos van der Donk (Sietse Klinkhamer). The actors are also identical twins, born March 6, 1988. The film is based on the books of Hotze de Roos about the adventures of the twins with their boat, the opduwer De Kameleon.

The film received a Golden Film (100,000 visitors) and a Platinum Film (400,000 visitors) and with 750.000 viewers in cinemas. It was the best viewed Dutch film production in 2003. In 2006 it was chosen as "Best Children's Movie" at the 4th International Film Festival in Eilat, Israel.

The film also has a sequel, Kameleon 2, with the same characters and actors. In 2021, it was followed by a second sequel De Kameleon aan de ketting.

== Plot ==
Hielke and Sietse Klinkhamer are a happy pair of identical twins, the sons of the friendly town blacksmith Evert "Heit" Klinkhamer and his wife "Mem" Klinkhamer, residents of Lenten, a sleepy little town on the Frisian coast.

One day, a girl named Esther, whose parents have recently passed away, arrives from the big city to live with her uncle Wim and aunt Margreet Bleeker, and becomes the Klinkhamers' new neighbor. The brother develop a crush on Esther, but she shows no interest in the boys and thinks they're dirty.

The brothers have just one big wish: a boat. When an opduwer crashes behind their father's blacksmith shop, they take their chances, and their father buy the boat for 30 guilders. The brothers begin to paint the boat, but are unable to do much with the boat as they do not have an engine for it.

But the residents don’t know that they are in grave danger. Meteorologists have predicted that a major hurricane is coming from England, heading straight for Friesland. Towns and villages in Friesland are all being warned, including the village of Lenten, but the mayor is too stubborn to sound the alarm. He casually dismisses Zwart, the local police officer who tries to warn him about the storm. But it is soon too late.

The storm arrives and grows increasingly dangerous, and a tornado forms in a field behind the Klinkhamers' blacksmith shop, destroying everything in the family's garden and threatening the boat, which is ultimately spared. While the village doctor is on his way to the blacksmith shop, the tornado strikes him and flings his car into the air. It lands in a ditch with a loud thud, and the doctor is in danger of drowning. Fortunately, the brothers Klinkhamer notice what is happening, warning Heit just in time and rescuing the doctor from his sinking car.

The next day, the damage becomes apparent. The streets are littered with debris, and the phone lines are cut. Esther's aunt has bad news: her husband did not come home from work that night, she and Esther had a sleepless night. When Heit, along with the twins, Zwart, Kees, and the miller, go looking for him, they find his body in the ditch, into which he had fallen during the storm and died. Mrs. Bleeker has to be hospitalized, and Esther has to stay with the Klinkhamers temporarily.

As a gift for saving his life, the doctor gives the car to the twins. Thanks to Gerben Zonderland, an old friend of the twins who helped to drag the doctor's car out of the ditch with his horses, the brothers get the idea to remove the car’s engine. They install it in the boat, along with the car's steering wheel, and build a speedboat. The boat is christened as the "Kameleon", a name created by the doctor when he noticed that the boat kept changing color whenever the engine started, just like a chameleon. The brothers test the boat and absolutely love it.

The brothers are immediately put to the test when a pair of criminal nozems from the big city come to terrorize the villagers. The nozems had previously mugged and injured Grandma de Jong, and they harass Esther just as the twin brothers are sailing by. They decide to chase the nozems by boat, but unfortunately their boat breaks down. It then turns out that the notary’s office has been broken into and 800 guilders have been stolen, for which Gerben is blamed. But later it turns out that the nozems were responsible.

During a swimming competition, the nozems steal money from an ice cream stand, and the skippers of the Kameleon end up chase them again by boat. Eventually, Zwart decides he’s had enough and calls the water police, but they are slow to respond. Eventually, the nozems’ boat almost collides with a cargo ship, and the hooligans jump out of the boat just in time, but they can’t swim. The twin brothers fish the nozems out of the water, and they are arrested by the police.

To celebrate the twins' bravery, a big village festival is held in their honor. They receive an official token of appreciation and a ribbon from the mayor, and the hooligans are forced to apologize to everyone. The brothers make a bet with Esther; whoever can jump over a ditch and make it to the other side gets a kiss from her. Both brothers jump over the ditch and so both get a kiss. In the end, the three sail away peacefully in their boat.

== Cast ==
- Koen van der Donk as Hielke Klinkhamer
- Jos van der Donk as Sietse Klinkhamer
- Maarten Spanjer as Gerben Zonderland
- Rense Westra as Veldwachter Zwart
- Saar Koningsberger as Esther Bleeker
- Willeke van Ammelrooy as Mevrouw Bleeker
- Peter Tuinman as Meneer Bleeker
- Gijs Scholten van Aschat as Burgemeester
- Meriyem Manders as Burgemeestersvrouw
- Dominique van Vliet as Mem Klinkhamer
