= Ajax: Hark the Herald Angel Sings =

- Theatrical release poster
- Directed by: Roel van Dalen
- Produced by: Frank de Jonge; Piet Erkelens; Paulien van de Wetering
- Production companies: ID&DTV Arts & Events; NPS
- Distributed by: RCV Film Distribution
- Release date: 21 December 2000
- Running time: 91 minutes
- Country: Netherlands
- Language: Dutch

Ajax: Hark the Herald Angels Sing (Dutch: Ajax: Daar hoorden zij engelen zingen) is a football documentary that goes behind the scenes at Ajax Amsterdam football club during the 1999/2000 season. It was sanctioned by the club as they were expecting a successful season but it was one of the worst seasons suffered by Ajax in recent history and the DVD did not show Ajax in good light. The documentary shows footage of the board room and meetings as well as the team's football camp in Ghana.

== Cast ==
- Danny Blind
- Cristian Chivu
- Bobby Haarms
- Hans Westerhof
- Jan Wouters
- Richard Witschge
- Nikos Machlas

The following people also appeared whilst studying at the Ajax Academy.

- Gregory van der Wiel
- Mitchell Donald
- Jeffrey Sarpong
- Donovan Slijngard
- Nordin Amrabat
- Evander Sno
- Jeremain Lens
- Johnny Heitinga

== Accolades ==
Accolades received by Ajax: Hark the Herald Angel Sings
Year	Award	Category	Recipient(s)	Result	Ref.
2001	Netherlands Film Festival	Golden Calf for Best Long Documentary	Roel van Dalen	Nominated	
