= Bloody Marie =

2019 film

- Film poster
- Directed by: Guido van Driel; Lennert Hillege
- Written by: Guido van Driel; Lennert Hillege
- Starring: Susanne Wolff
- Cinematography: Lennert Hillege
- Edited by: Stijn Deconinck
- Music by: Matthijs Kieboom
- Release date: 27 January 2019
- Running time: 87 minutes
- Country: Netherlands
- Languages: Dutch; German; English

Bloody Marie is a 2019 Dutch action thriller film written and directed by Guido van Driel and Lennert Hillege. It stars Susanne Wolff. In July 2019, it was shortlisted as one of the nine films in contention to be the Dutch entry for the Academy Award for Best International Feature Film at the 92nd Academy Awards, but it was not selected.

== Cast ==
- Susanne Wolff as Marie Wankelmut
- Dragos Bucur as Dragomir
- Alexia Lestiboudois as Iliana
- Teun Luijkx as Ferry
- Jan Bijvoet as Oscar
- Mark Rietman as Jos
- Aart Staartjes as Neighbour
- Murth Mossel as Lucas

== Production ==
In January 2018 it was announced that Mark Rietman, Teun Luijkx, Aart Staartjes and Murth Mossel were added to the cast.
