= Jeroom =

Belgian cartoonist

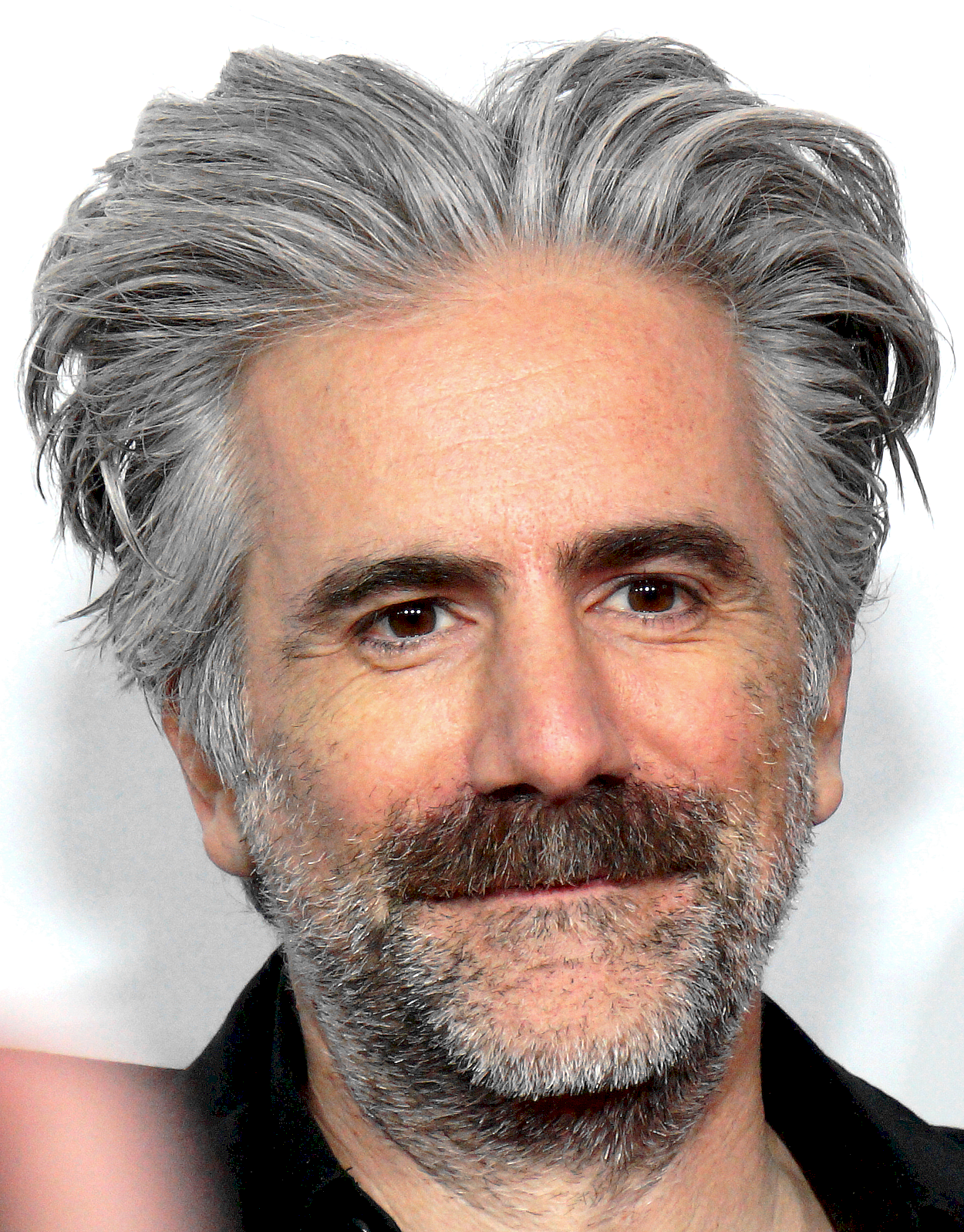

Jeroom Snelders (born 22 April 1977) is a Belgian cartoonist and standup comedian, who frequently publishes in the magazine Humo. He studied Graphic design at St. Lucas in Ghent, where one of his teachers was Ever Meulen. He has published his work in the collections Rudy (2002) and Het Hol van de Reet (2003). His work is characterized by absurd humor and surreal situations, some of which presented in cut-and-paste photo comics.

He won the Belgium Press Cartoon 2002 and is engaged to Belgian athlete Élodie Ouédraogo.

Since 2023, Jeroom and Philippe Geubels present the Dutch comedy television show LOL: Last One Laughing which airs on Prime Video. The show is the Dutch version of the Japanese television show Documental.
