= Philippe Geubels =

Flemish stand-up comedian (born 1981)

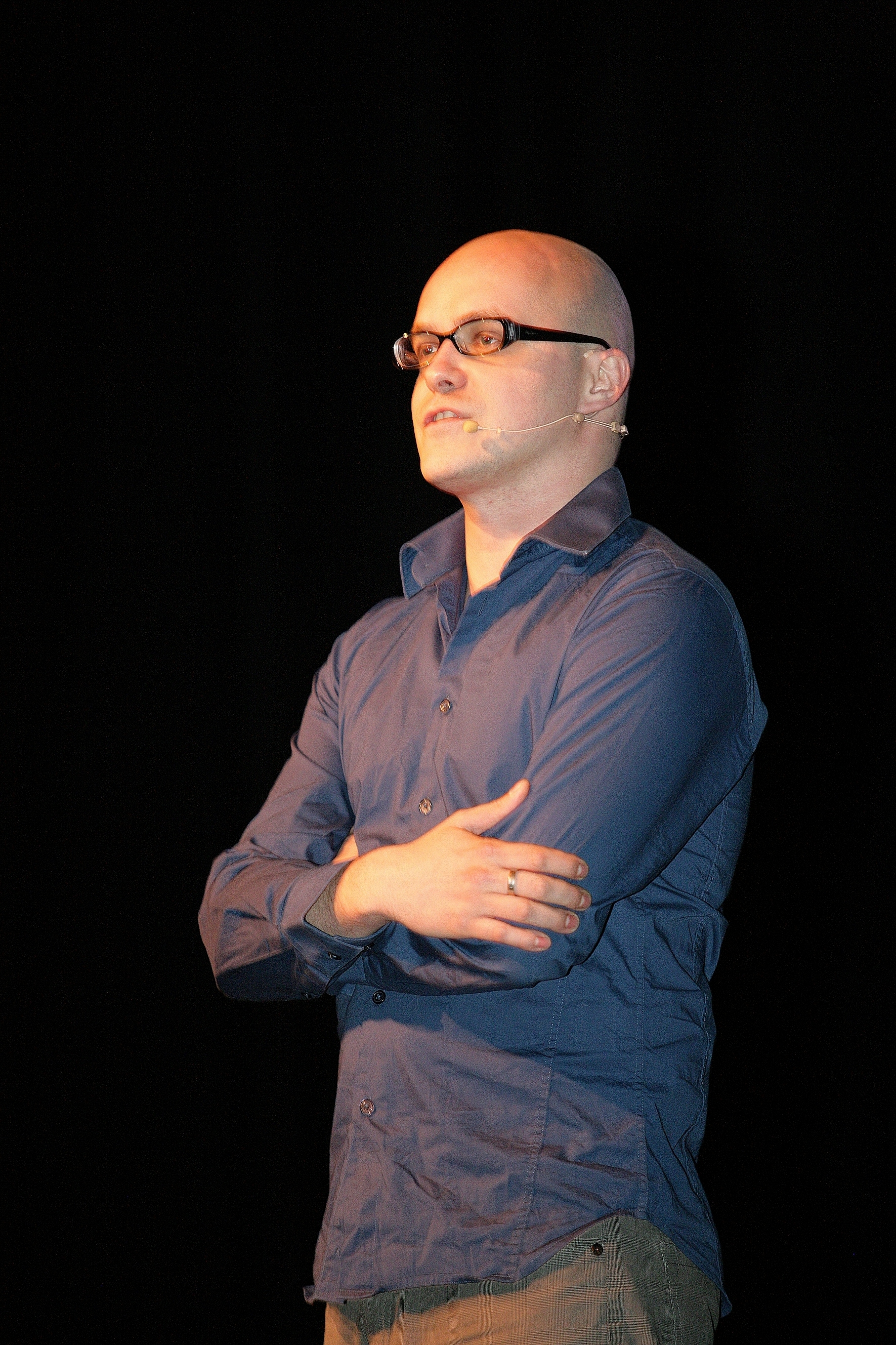
- Geubels in 2009
- Born: 15 April 1981 (age 45); Dendermonde, Belgium
- Occupations: Actor, presenter, contestant, jury member, comedian
- Years active: 2009–present

Philippe Geubels (born 15 April 1981) is a Flemish stand-up comedian and television presenter. He is known for his comedy shows and as jury member in the quiz show De Slimste Mens ter Wereld. He has also presented multiple television shows, including the show Taboe which received a nomination for an International Emmy Award.

== Career ==
Since 2009, Geubels appears as jury member in the De Slimste Mens ter Wereld television quiz show. He also appeared as contestant in the show in 2008 and 2019. Geubels appeared as contestant in the Dutch version of the quiz show, titled De slimste mens, in 2022.

In 2013 and 2014 he presented the television show Geubels en de Belgen, a Belgian remake of the British television show John Bishop's Britain. In 2014, he played the role of Danny in the comedy film K3 Dierenhotel.

Geubels, Guido Weijers, Jandino Asporaat and Roué Verveer performed a comedy show titled Gabbers in 2016 and 2017 in the Ziggo Dome. They also performed a show in 2025.

In 2018, he presented the television show Taboe (Dutch for Taboo) in which he explores humor and topics that tend to be taboo in comedy. A year later, the show was nominated for an International Emmy Award in the category Non-Scripted Entertainment but did not win. The British show The Real Full Monty: Ladies' Night won the award instead.

In 2019, Geubels presented the television show Is er een dokter in de zaal?, a game show about medical topics. In the same year, Geubels played the lead role in the television series Geub in which he plays a fictional version of himself. On his 38th birthday, in 2019, he visited Philippe of Belgium, also born on 15 April, in his palace in Brussels.

Geubels presented the first season of the quiz show Ik heb het u letterlijk juist gezegd in 2023. The show is similar to the British show I Literally Just Told You. Sven de Leijer presented the second season of the show in 2024.

Since 2023, Geubels and Jeroom present the Dutch comedy television show LOL: Last One Laughing which airs on Prime Video. The show is the Dutch version of the Japanese television show Documental.

== Filmography ==
=== As actor ===
- K3 Dierenhotel (2014)
- Geub (2019)

=== As presenter ===
- Geubels en de Belgen (2013, 2014)
- Geubels en de Idioten (2015)
- Taboe (2018)
- Is er een dokter in de zaal? (2019)
- Ik heb het u letterlijk juist gezegd (2023)
- LOL: Last One Laughing (2023, Dutch television)

=== As jury member ===
- De Slimste Mens ter Wereld (2009 – present)

=== As contestant ===
- De Slimste Mens ter Wereld (2008, 2019)
