= Bon Bini Holland 3 =

2022 Dutch film directed by Pieter van Rijn

- Theatrical release poster
- Directed by: Pieter van Rijn
- Produced by: Maarten Swart
- Cinematography: Coen Stroeve
- Edited by: Michiel Boesveldt
- Music by: Michiel Marsman; Willem Friede
- Production company: Kaap Holland Film
- Distributed by: WW Entertainment
- Release date: 30 June 2022
- Country: Netherlands
- Language: Dutch

Bon Bini Holland 3 is a 2022 Dutch comedy film directed by Pieter van Rijn. The film won the Golden Film award after having sold 100,000 tickets. The film also won the Platinum Film award after having sold 400,000 tickets. The film is the sequel to the 2018 film Bon Bini Holland 2.

Jandino Asporaat, Tygo Gernandt and Rico Verhoeven play roles in the film. It was the second best visited Dutch film of 2022 with just over 440,000 visitors. The film finished in 15th place in the list of best visited films in the Netherlands in 2022.

The film won the 2022 Gouden Kalf van het Publiek award. The film also won the Favoriete Jeugdfilm NL award at the 2023 Zapp Awards.

The film was shot in the Netherlands, Germany, Curaçao and New York City.

== See also ==
- Bon Bini Holland (2015 film)
- Bon Bini Holland 2 (2018 film)
- Bon Bini: Bangkok Nights (2023 film)
