= Taboe =

Belgian television show

- Title screen
- Directed by: Kat Steppe
- Presented by: Philippe Geubels
- Country of origin: Belgium
- Original language: Dutch
- No. of seasons: 3
- No. of episodes: 22

Production
- Production company: Panenka

Original release
- Network: Eén
- Release: 2018

Taboe (Dutch for Taboo) is a Flemish television show in which Philippe Geubels explores humor and topics that tend to be taboo in comedy, including physical limitations, terminal illnesses, skin color and poverty.

In December 2018, the show won the Ha! award for best television show, an annual award by HUMO magazine.

In 2019, the show received a nomination for an International Emmy Award in the category Non-Scripted Entertainment. The show did not win the Emmy Award; the British show The Real Full Monty: Ladies' Night won the award instead.

== Concept ==
Every episode Philippe Geubels invites around four people in his holiday home. People with a physical disability, people suffering from an incurable disease, LGBTs and so on. In short, people whom you wouldn't laugh at. He visits the area with them and listens to everyone's story. Meanwhile, he brings a stand-up comedy about the theme of the evening, the audience is composed of people similar to the guests.

== Seasons ==
=== Season 1 ===
| Ep. | First aired | Theme | Live viewers (VOD) |
|---|---|---|---|
| 1 | 21 January 2018 | Physical disability | 1,527,192 (1,791,717) |
| 2 | 28 January 2018 | Terminally ill people | 1,693,706 (1,862,176) |
| 3 | 4 February 2018 | People of colour | 1,619,367 (1,778,192) |
| 4 | 11 February 2018 | Visually impaired | 1,582,845 (1,771,238) |
| 5 | 18 February 2018 | Poverty | 1,595,417 (1,776,098) |
| 6 | 25 February 2018 | Psychological vulnerability | 1,568,207 (1,762,192) |
| 7 | 4 March 2018 | LGBT | 1,638,306 (1,822,334) |
| 8 | 11 March 2018 | Obese people | 1,639,000 (1,857,674) |
| - | 18 March 2018 | Compilation | 1,444,964 (1,519,568) |

=== Season 2 ===
| Ep. | First aired | Theme | Live viewers (VOD) |
|---|---|---|---|
| 1 | 26 December 2021 | People with autism | 1,279,897 (1,566,714) |
| 2 | 2 January 2022 | Women | 1,267,989 (1,539,809) |
| 3 | 9 January 2022 | Seniors | 1,569,371 (1,767,682) |
| 4 | 16 January 2022 | People who are involuntarily childless | 1,433,167 (1,670,538) |
| 5 | 23 January 2022 | People with an unusual appearance | 1,474,755 (1,491,430) |
| 6 | 30 January 2022 | People who have struggled with addiction | 1,316,281 (1,610,783) |
| 7 | 6 February 2022 | Gender diversity | 1,575,769 (1,762,059) |
| - | 13 February 2022 | Compilation | 1,194,377 |

=== Season 3 ===
The third season aired in 2025.
