= Bon Bini: Bangkok Nights =

2023 Dutch film directed by Pieter van Rijn

- Theatrical release poster
- Directed by: Pieter van Rijn
- Produced by: Maarten Swart
- Cinematography: Joost Rietdijk
- Edited by: Peter Alderliesten; Annelies van Woerden
- Production company: Kaap Holland Film
- Distributed by: WW Entertainment
- Release date: 20 December 2023
- Running time: 91 minutes
- Country: Netherlands
- Language: Dutch
- Box office: $6.5 million

Bon Bini: Bangkok Nights (Note: Sometimes referred to as Bon Bini 4 or Bon Bini Holland 4.) is a 2023 Dutch comedy film directed by Pieter van Rijn. The film won the Golden Film award after having sold 100,000 tickets. The film also won the Platinum Film award after having sold 400,000 tickets. The film is the sequel to the 2022 film Bon Bini Holland 3.

Jandino Asporaat, Ankie Beilke and Phi Nguyen play roles in the film. Amsterdam-based Chinese actor Kwok One also plays the film's antagonist, Lo Pei Chan. The film had the best opening day at the box office for a Dutch film in 2023. The film became the fifth best visited Dutch film of 2023. The film became the second best visited Dutch film of 2024. In total, just over 550,000 tickets were sold in 2023 and 2024.

Principal photography began in June 2023. The film was shot in the Netherlands, Ghana and Thailand.

In September 2024, the film won the 2023 Gouden Kalf van het Publiek award.

== Cast ==
- Jandino Asporaat as Judeska / Gerrie / Ahmed / Robertico / Rajesh
- Sergio IJssel as Noltie
- Phi Nguyen as Ping Ping
- Liliana de Vries as Noëlla Maduro
- Alpha Oumar Barry as Kofi
- Ankie Beilke as Yena

== See also ==
- Bon Bini Holland (2015 film)
- Bon Bini Holland 2 (2018 film)
- Bon Bini Holland 3 (2022 film)
