= Zeg 'ns Aaa =

Dutch TV sitcom (1981–1993)

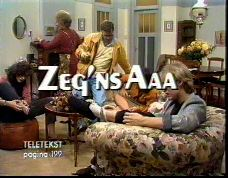
- Title card (1985)
- Genre: Sitcom
- Created by: Chiem van Houweninge; Alexander Pola
- Starring: Sjoukje Hooymaayer; Manfred de Graaf; Carry Tefsen; John Leddy
- Theme music composer: Ruud Bos
- Opening theme: Zeg 'ns Aaa
- Country of origin: Netherlands
- Original language: Dutch
- No. of seasons: 13
- No. of episodes: 225

Production
- Production companies: Omroepvereniging VARA (1981-1993); BDEG (2009)

Original release
- Network: VARA
- Release: 1 January 1981 – 13 February 1993
- Network: RTL 4
- Release: 7 March 2009 – 29 April 2010

Zeg 'ns Aaa (Say Aah) is a Dutch sitcom, situated in the medical practice of a general practitioner and revolving around herself, her family, and her housekeeper.

The title refers to the imperative phrase Say Aah, often said by doctors when they want to inspect the mouth cavity of a patient.

The series ran for 212 episodes from 1981 until 1993 and was broadcast by the VARA. It was also shown on Belgian television and with English subtitles on Super Channel and on SBS-TV in Australia. There also was a German spin-off, "Sag mal Aah".

Chiem van Houweninge and Alexander Pola originally wrote the scripts, later aided by Marina de Vos, Van Houweninge's wife. In the last season Lars Boom also wrote scripts. The title music was composed by Ruud Bos.

In 1984 the series won the Gouden Televizier-Ring for best show on Dutch television that year.

In 1991 the series was given a spin-off, Oppassen!!! (Take Care!!!), which ran until 2003.

Between 2007 and 2008 there was a theatre show of Zeg 'ns Aaa.

In 2009 the series was unsuccessfully reprised for one season on RTL 4.

== Cast ==
- Sjoukje Hooymaayer - Dr. Lydie van der Ploeg
- Manfred de Graaf - Dr. Hans Lansberg
- Carry Tefsen - Mien Dobbelsteen
- John Leddy - Koos Dobbelsteen
