= K3 Dierenhotel =

2014 film

- Film poster
- Directed by: Bart Van Leemputten
- Written by: Hans Bourlon; Nico De Braeckeleer; Bart van Leemputten; Gert Verhulst
- Produced by: Barbara Snoeck; Anja Van Mensel
- Cinematography: Mark Van Acker
- Music by: Olaf Janssen; Miquel wiels; Alain Van De Putte; Peter Gilles
- Production company: Studio 100
- Distributed by: Belgium:Kinepolis Film Distribution; Netherlands:Independent Films
- Release date: 12 February 2014
- Running time: 88 minutes
- Country: Belgium
- Language: Dutch

K3 Dierenhotel is a Flemish comedy film from 2014, directed by Bart Van Leemputten and based on the comedyseries Hallo K3 It is the fifth K3-film and the second one with Josje Huisman. This is also the last film with former members of K3.

== Plot ==
Kristel has plans to stay at a beauty farm for the weekend. Karen and Josje are helping Bas at an kennel/animal hotel, but Kristel doesn't know this. Because of a GPS mix-up, the girls arrive at the wrong place. Karen knows this, but Josje doesn't. So Karen wants her to think the beauty farm is a kennel. When they find out the kennel may be torn down the girls come together to save it.

== Cast ==
- Karen Damen as herself
- Josje Huisman as herself
- Kristel Verbeke as herself
- Albert Verlinde as Mr. Francois
- Philippe Geubels as Danny
- Metta Gramberg as Rosie
- Winston Post as Bas
- Jacques Vermeire as Marcel
- Dries van Hegen as Mr. de Vries
- Serge-Henri Valcke as Eric-Jan
- Maarten Bosmans as Man
- Daisy Thys as Mrs. Lama
