= Hollywood Zakoshisyoh =

Japanese comedian (born 1974)

- ハリウッドザコシショウ
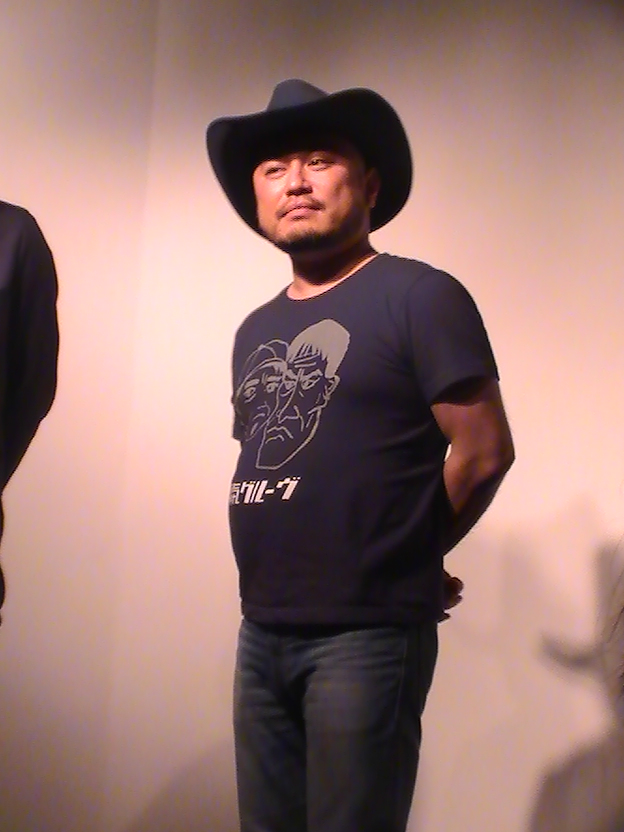
- Hollywood Zakoshisyoh (May 2017)
- Born: Shigeki Nakazawa; 13 February 1974 (age 52); Shimizu-ku, Shizuoka, Shizuoka Prefecture
- Partner: Chappa Shizuoka (G Mens)

Comedy career
- Years active: 1993–
- Website: Profile

Notes
- Same year/generation as: Tomonori Jinnai; Nakagawake; Kendo Kobayashi; Kenji Tamura

Hollywood Zakoshisyoh (ハリウッドザコシショウ, Hariuddo Zakoshishō; born 13 February 1974) is a Japanese comedian from Shimizu-shi (now Shimizu-ku, Shizuoka), Shizuoka Prefecture who has appeared in many television variety shows, as well as television dramas, radio and web series. His real name is Shigeki Nakazawa (中澤 滋紀, Nakazawa Shigeki). After going through Yoshimoto Kogyo and Watanabe Entertainment, he currently belongs to the SMA NEET Project. His stage name during his kombi years was Zakoshisyoh (ザコシショウ, Zakoshishō; There was also the notation "Zako Shishō" (ザコ師匠; Zako Master)). He is nicknamed "Zakoshi," (ザコシ) "Zakoshisyoh". Martial artist Shinya Aoki is his cousin.

His stage name was derived from the fact that Hulk Hogan was identifying himself as Hollywood Hulk Hogan at the time when nWo was formed.

== Appearing programmes ==
=== Variety ===
- On-air Battle+ (NHK-G) KO winner 0 wins 1 loss; maximum 261 KB
- Yoshimoto Chōgōkin K-KenKoba Daiō
- Yarisugi Koji (TX)
- Arabiki-dan (TBS: 10 Oct 2010 – 27 Sep 2011) — Performer with the most performances in the programme. Co-starred with "Zakoba with Beichō", Zakoba, and Takeshi Nadagi.
- Enta no Tenshi (NTV)...catch copy is "Chameleon Jūsensha"
- Jichael Mackson (MBS: 20 Feb 2008) — part of the former G Mens
- Game Record GP (Mondo21: 17 Feb 2008 –)
- Owarai Zukan Hamanuki (tvk)
- Waratte Iitomo! (CX, 27 Mar 2008)
- Jagaimon (TeleAsa Channel, 25 Dec 2008)
- Goro Presents My Fair Lady (TBS)
- Cunning no Renai Chūdoku (GyaO!)
- Kyakure-ga (ABC, 13 Aug 2010)
- Hitoshi Matsumoto no Marumaru Hanashi (CX, 5 Aug 2011)
- Docking 48 (KTV, 23 Aug 2011)
- Ameagari Kesshitai no Talk Bangumi Ametalk! Tachiguisoba Geinin (EX, 6 Oct 2011)
- Pierre Taki no Shonnai TV (SATV, 10 Jan 2013 –) — Occasional appearances as self-proclaimed quasi-regular
- Downtown no Gaki no Tsukai ya Arahende!! (NTV, 3 Feb 2013 – 3 Apr 2016)
- Mabatakī (CX, 27 Mar 2013)
- Team Ariyoshi: Marumaru shitara Sokuintai Special (TBS, 9 Jan 2015)
- Sakurai-Ariyoshi Abunai Yakai (TBS, 4 Jun 2015)
- Kosokoso Chaplin, Jiwajiwa Chaplin (TX) — First victory at broadcasting session on 12 February 2017
- Downtown Now (CX, 18 Mar 2016)
- Kanjani8 no Janiben (KTV, Apr 2016)
- Bakushō Sokkuri Monomane Kōhaku Uta Gassen Special (CX, 6 May 2016)
- Chō Hamaru! Bakushō Chara Parade (CX)
- R-1 Grand Prix 2016 Yūshō-sha Tokuban Ureteru Yatsura ni Manabu! Hollywood Zakoshisyoh TV no Okite (KTV—CX, 12 Jun 2016)
- Wednesday's Downtown (TBS, 7 Dec 2016 —) — Occasional appearances

=== TV dramas ===
- Tetsuko no Sodate-kata (Apr—Jun 2014, NBN)
- Boku no Yabai Tsuma (Jun 2016, KTV)

=== Radio programmes ===
- Mana Sakura—Hollywood Zakoshisyoh no Asamade Maruhadaka! (3 (late at 2nd) Apr — 25 (late at 24th) Sep, NCB)

=== Webcasts ===
- Namaiki! Arabiki-dan (2012–14, YNN, TBS Channel)
- Hitoshi Matsumoto presents Documental (2018, Amazon Prime Video) — Season 5

=== Music Videos ===
- Polkadot Stingray - A-un (2019)

== Other works ==
=== CD ===
- Gokiburi Otoko (18 Jan 2017, Sony Music Labels Inc.)

=== DVD ===
- Hollywood Zakoshisyoh no Monomane 100 Renpatsu Live (6 Jul 2016, Aniplex)
- Choppiri Hazukashīkedo Waratte Hoshīkara Mite hoshī (17 Feb 2017, Goma-Books)

== Award history ==
- Arabiki-dan presents Ara-1 Grand Prix 2014 Victory
- 2nd Hollywood Zakoshisyoh's Wameki-1 Grand Prix Victory
- Shimokitazawa Daiko Line Intermission VTR Award Victory
- R-1 Grand Prix Victory
- Documental Season 5 Victory
- Documental Season 7 Victory
- Documental Season 10 Victory
