= Murth The Man-O-Script =

Dutch rapper and comedian

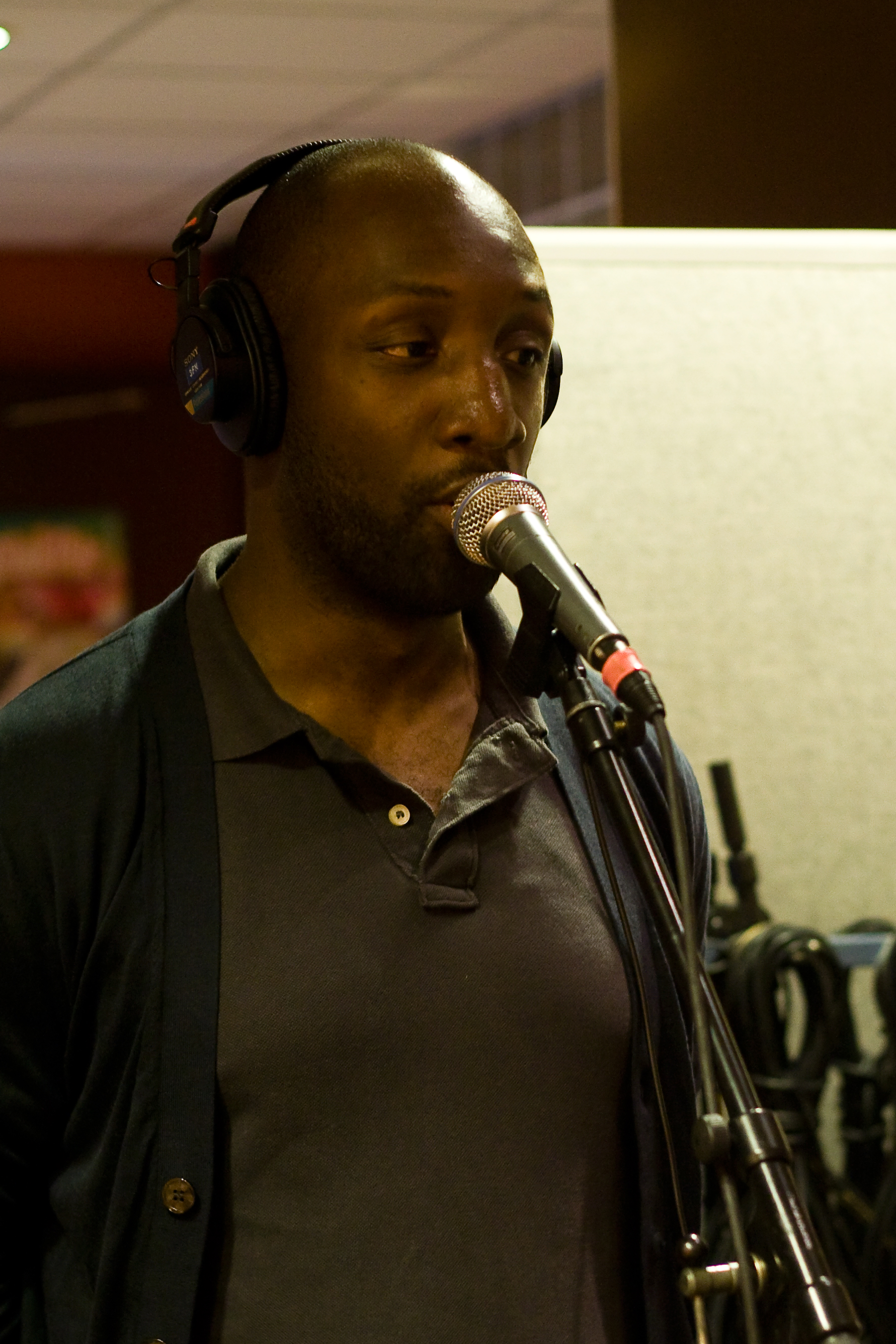
Murth The Man-O-Script

Murth Mossel (Amsterdam, 6 February 1970), also known as Murth The Man O Script, is a Dutch rapper and stand-up comedian.

== Biography ==
In the early 1990s Murth did his stand-up routines at Comedytrain and Freshwagon. Being involved in the hiphop-scene for years he collaborated on Extince's 1998 Zoete Inval/Zoute Uitval-single among others; in 1999 he made a cameo-appearance in the video for Def Rhymz' "Doekoe".

During this period Murth was a VJ at TMF hosting The Pitch; his next job was presenting Paradisolife for NOS; a series of package-concerts made up of individual performances and special collaborations (for example, triphop-outfit Lamb teaming up with jazz-crossover group New Cool Collective). Paradisolife was voted Best Music Programme in 2001.

In 2004 he expanded to cartoon-voices; credits include The Thunderbirds.

In 2005 Murth performed his debut-theatre-show Niet Vanzelfsprekend (Don't Take It For Granted) at a joint tour with Roue Verveer whose M.A.W. was the opening part. He also made Comedytrain-trips to countries such as Suriname and China; in 2009 his first full-length solo-show Status Aparte premiered.

In between his Comedytrain-commitments, Murth continued rapping; he released three albums with rap-collective Flinke Namen; their 2009-single Als Zij Langs Loopt became a top 20-hit. Follow-up Wolken, accompanied by a black 'n white-video in which Murth played a cab-driver, stalled in the bubbling-under charts.

He currently tours with his solo-show Eerste Persoonn Enkelvoud.

In 2019 he appeared in the drama film Bloody Marie.
