= John Leddy =

Dutch actor (1930–2022)

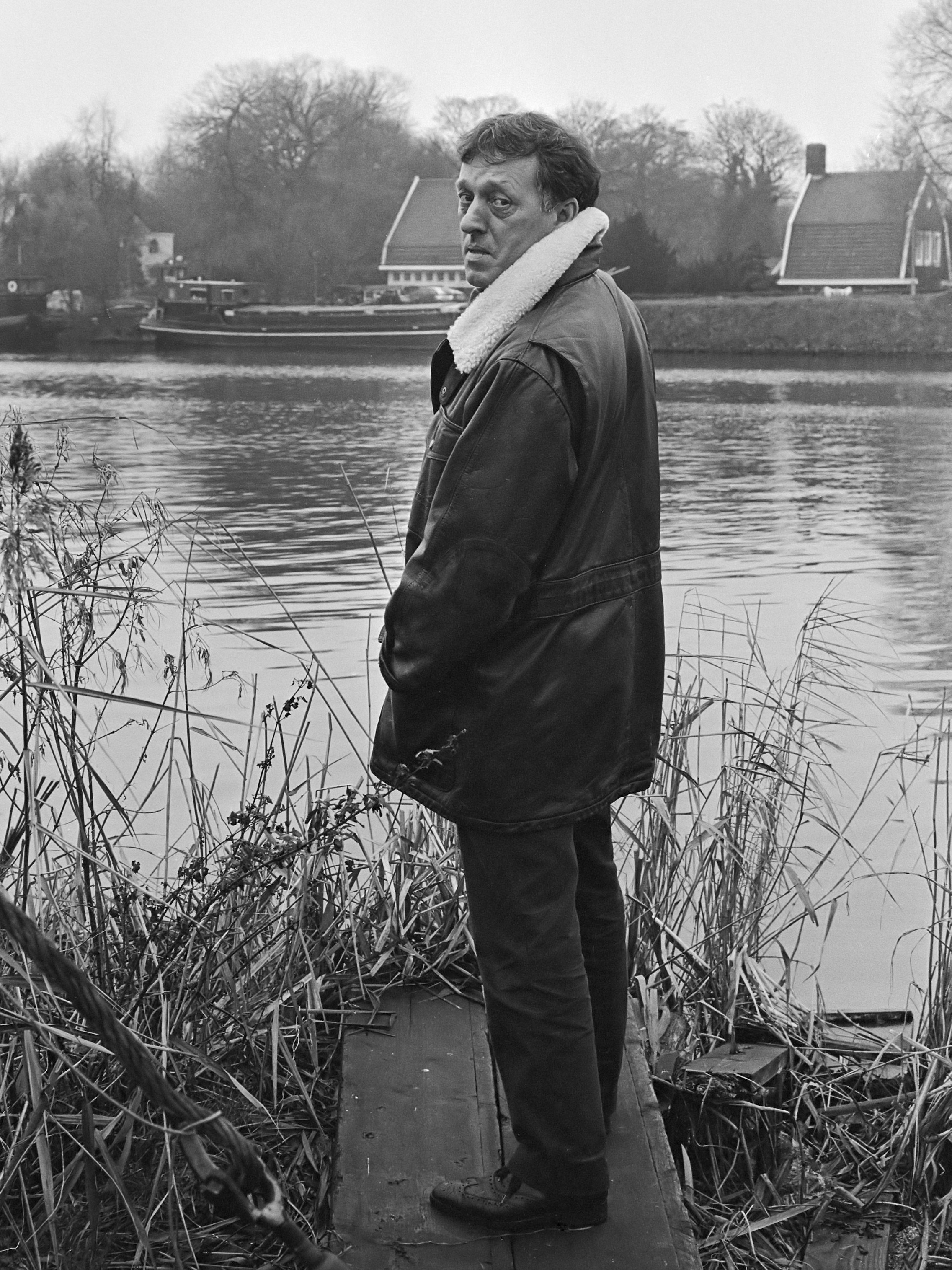
- Leddy in 1984
- Born: Johannes Nicolaas Leddy; 12 January 1930; The Hague, Netherlands
- Died: 25 December 2022 (aged 92) 's-Hertogenbosch, Netherlands
- Occupation: Actor
- Years active: 1960–2022

Johannes Nicolaas Leddy (12 January 1930 – 25 December 2022) was a Dutch television and film actor. He was most known for his roles as Jan Engelmoer in the television series De kleine waarheid and as Koos Dobbelsteen in Zeg 'ns Aaa.

Leddy died at the Jeroen Bosch Hospital in 's-Hertogenbosch, on 25 December 2022, at the age of 92.
