= LOL: Last One Laughing Philippines =

Philippine reality competition

- Season 2 promotional poster
- Also known as: LOL PH
- Genre: Reality competition; Comedy
- Created by: Hitoshi Matsumoto
- Based on: Documental
- Written by: Evette Borromeo
- Directed by: Jay Klio Bermudez
- Presented by: Vice Ganda
- Country of origin: Philippines
- Original languages: Filipino; English
- No. of seasons: 2
- No. of episodes: 12

Production
- Producers: Madonna Tarrayo; Randolph Longjas; Noemi Peji; Katrina Holigores
- Camera setup: Multi-camera
- Running time: 30 minutes
- Production companies: Amazon MGM Studios; Unitel Straight Shooters

Original release
- Network: Amazon Prime Video
- Release: July 4, 2024 – present

LOL: Last One Laughing Philippines is a Philippine comedy reality competition show based on Documental, a format created by Japanese comedian Hitoshi Matsumoto. Hosted by comedian, presenter, and actor Vice Ganda, it aired on Prime Video on July 4, 2024.

The series currently has three winners: Chad Kinis for season 1, and Candy Pangilinan and Donna Cariaga for season 2.

== Development ==
On May 30, 2024, it was announced via Prime Video Philippines' social media accounts that a Philippine version of Documental (known as Last One Laughing in other countries) is in the works, and will premiere on July 4 of the same year. On June 19 and 26, 2024, Vice, the competing celebrities, and Prime Video Philippines released the series' trailer and teasers on their respective social media accounts.

== Format ==
Ten comedians stay in a living-room style studio with hidden cameras for a few hours (usually six). During this time, they must try to make their opponents laugh in any way and by any means, while not reacting at their opponents’ attempts to make them break. At the first laugh, the competitor is cautioned (yellow carded), while a second eliminates the player from the game (red carded). However, large infractions may be given an automatic red card. Eliminated players join the host in the observation room, but may return as an external challenger to the remaining contestants. The comedians can also be eliminated if they aren't active enough. The only way to communicate with the outside is a telephone controlled by the host.

The winner of each season receives a cash prize of ₱1,000,000 and a trophy.

Additional mechanics include:

- Joker — known as Lights, Camera, LOL! in this version, all contestants must watch the selected contestant perform their act. The Joker could only be activated by the host through a lever, which triggered a roulette to determine who would perform and for how long, unlike other versions where the Joker could be used by a contestant.
- Guests — known as ResBeks, a portmanteau of resbak (meaning revenge) and beks (a wordplay on bakla, meaning gay), these guests were invited throughout the season and were not bound by the same rules as the contestants in an attempt to make them laugh.
- English-only mode — a twist unique to this version, all contestants were required to speak in English for a specific duration.
- External challengers — eliminated contestants return as challengers to test the remaining contestants.

== Series overview ==
Season	Episodes	Originally released		Winner(s)	Runner-up
Season	Episodes	First released	Last released	Winner(s)	Runner-up
1	6	July 4, 2024	July 18, 2024	Chad Kinis	Jerald Napoles
2	6	October 30, 2026	November 6, 2026	Candy Pangilinan and Donna Cariaga	Charuth

== Seasons ==
=== Season 1 ===
The first season ran from July 4 to 18, 2024.

Chad Kinis was proclaimed the winner of the first season on July 18, 2024.

==== Contestants ====
The ten contestants were revealed on June 17, 2024.

List of LOL: Last One Laughing Philippines season 1 contestants
Contestant	Episode entered	Episode exited	Status
Chad Kinis	1	6	Winner
Jerald Napoles	1	6	Runner-up
Pepe Herrera	1	5	Eliminated
Victor Anastacio	1	5	Eliminated
Empoy Marquez	1	5	Eliminated
Tuesday Vargas	1	4	Eliminated
Rufa Mae Quinto	1	4	Eliminated
Kim Molina	1	2	Eliminated
Jayson Gainza	1	2	Eliminated
Negi	1	2	Eliminated
Temporary Guests (The ResBeks)
Divine Tetay	6; 3	6; 3	Guest
Petite	3	3	Guest

==== Results ====
Season 1 final results
Contestant	Episode						Laughs
Contestant	1	2	3	4	5	6	Laughs
Chad	SAFE	SAFE	SAFE	SAFE	Yellow card	WIN	2 (Note: He made Rufa Mae Quinto and Empoy Marquez laugh during the competition.)
Jerald	SAFE	SAFE	SAFE	SAFE	Yellow card	LOSE	1 (Note: He made Empoy Marquez laugh during the competition.)
Pepe	SAFE	SAFE	SAFE	SAFE	Yellow card Red card		0
Victor	SAFE	SAFE	SAFE	SAFE	Yellow card Red card		0
Empoy	SAFE	SAFE	SAFE	SAFE	Yellow card Red card		0
Tuesday	SAFE	SAFE	SAFE	Yellow card Red card			0
Rufa Mae	SAFE	SAFE	Yellow card	Red card			0
Kim	SAFE	Yellow card Red card					0
Jayson	Yellow card	Red card					0
Negi	Yellow card	Red card					0

(yellow card) Contestant received a yellow card
(red card) Contestant received a red card and was eliminated
SAFE Contestant did not receive a yellow or red card.
WIN Contestant was the winner of LOL: Last One Laughing Philippines.
LOSE Contestant was the runner-up of LOL: Last One Laughing Philippines.

=== Season 2 ===
The second season ran from October 30 to November 6, 2026. The season was divided into two parts. The first part, consisting of the first three episodes, was released on October 30, while the second part, comprising the final three episodes, were released on November 6.

Candy Pangilinan and Donna Cariaga were jointly declared the winners of the second season on November 6, 2026.

==== Contestants ====
The contestants were revealed on September 30, 2026.

Notable contestants include Epy Quizon, the son of "Comedy King" Dolphy, and Ethel Booba, a television personality and one of the original champions of the videoke singing game show Sing Galing!, and the grand champion of Tawag ng Tanghalan: Celebrity Champions.

List of LOL: Last One Laughing Philippines season 2 contestants
Contestant	Episode entered	Episode exited	Status
Candy Pangilinan	1	6	Winner
Donna Cariaga	1	6	Winner
Charuth (Note: Real name: Charlize Ruth Reyes)	1	6	Runner-up
Chariz Solomon	1	5	Eliminated
Long Mejia	1	5	Eliminated
James Caraan	1	5	Eliminated
Epy Quizon	1	3	Eliminated
Ethel Booba	1	3	Eliminated
Esnyr	1	2	Eliminated
Pooh	1	2	Eliminated
Temporary Guests
Rufa Mae Quinto Season 1	3	4	Guest

==== Results ====
Season 2 results
Contestant	Episode						Result
Contestant	1	2	3	4	5	6	Result
Candy	SAFE	Yellow card	SAFE	SAFE	SAFE	WIN	1 (Note: She made Chariz Solomon laugh during the competition.)
Donna	SAFE	SAFE	SAFE	SAFE	Yellow card	WIN	1 (Note: She made Ethel Booba laugh during the competition.)
Charuth	SAFE	SAFE	SAFE	SAFE	Yellow card	LOSE	0
Chariz	SAFE	SAFE	SAFE	SAFE	Yellow card Red card		0
Long	SAFE	SAFE	SAFE	Yellow card	Red card		1 (Note: He made Esnyr laugh during the competition.)
James	SAFE	SAFE	SAFE	Yellow card	Red card		1 (Note: He made Epy Quizon laugh during the competition.)
Epy	SAFE	Yellow card	Red card				0
Ethel	SAFE	Yellow card	Red card				0
Esnyr	Yellow card	Red card					0
Pooh	Yellow card	Red card					0

(yellow card) Contestant received a yellow card
(red card) Contestant received a red card and was eliminated
SAFE Contestant did not receive a yellow or red card.
WIN Contestant was the winner of LOL: Last One Laughing Philippines.
LOSE Contestant was the runner-up of LOL: Last One Laughing Philippines.

== Reception ==
Following its premiere on July 4, 2024, LOL: Last One Laughing Philippines became Prime Video's number one reality competition show and trended across various social media networks. The series also gained popularity online after funny clips from the show were shared on Facebook.
