= Roué Verveer =

Surinamese-Dutch comedian (born 1972)

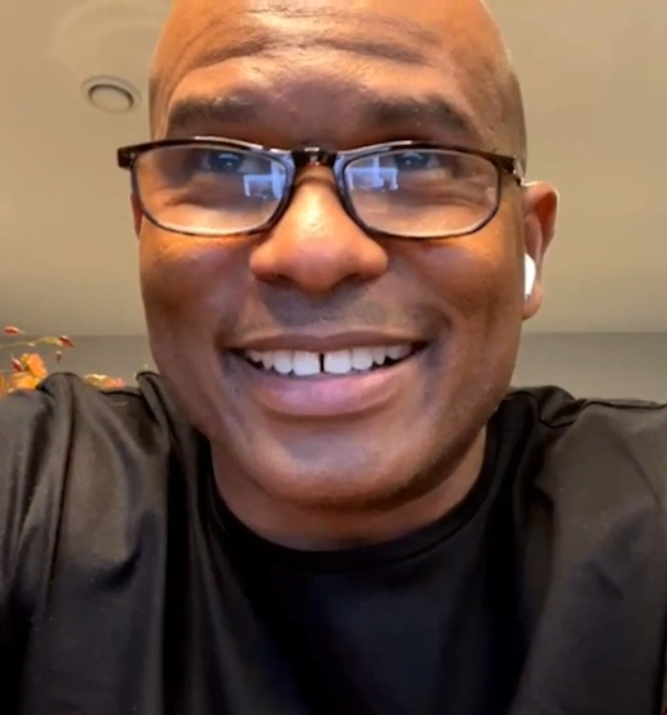
- Verveer in 2021
- Born: November 17, 1972 (age 53); Paramaribo, Suriname

Comedy career
- Years active: 1999–present
- Medium: Stand-up, television, film
- Genre: comedy

Roué Verveer (born November 17, 1972) is a Surinamese-Dutch comedian, television presenter and actor.

== Biography ==
Verveer was born and raised in Paramaribo, Suriname. In 1995, he came into contact with stand-up comedy and participated in a talent show.

In 1999, Verveer moved to the Netherlands and joined Raoul Heertje's comedy company "Comedytrain" that same year. In 2003, he performed his first full-length theater program, named Eigen vermogen ("Equity"), a title with a double meaning and a nod to Verveer's background in the financial sector.

In 2010 and 2011, Verveer performed together with fellow comedians Murth Mossel, Jandino Asporaat and Howard Komproe under the name "Caribbean Combo". The comedy group toured the Netherlands, Suriname and the Dutch Caribbean islands during the Winter months.

Verveer, Philippe Geubels, Guido Weijers and Jandino Asporaat performed a comedy show titled Gabbers in 2016 and 2017 in the Ziggo Dome. They also performed a show in 2025.

Verveer appeared in an episode of the 2025 season of the television show The Masked Singer.
