= Kameleon 2 =

2005 film

- Theatrical release poster
- Directed by: Steven de Jong
- Starring: Hielke Klinkhamer; Sietse Klinkhamer
- Distributed by: Independent Films
- Release date: 16 June 2005
- Running time: 105 minutes
- Country: Netherlands
- Language: Dutch

Kameleon 2 is a 2005 Dutch family film with main characters identical twins Hielke Klinkhamer (Koen van der Donk) and Sietse Klinkhamer (Jos van der Donk), also identical twins, born 6 March 1988. It follows the twins as they try to raise money for their sick friend Marieke.

It is a sequel of De Schippers van de Kameleon, with these same characters and actors. In 2021, it was followed by a sequel De Kameleon aan de ketting.

== Plot ==
In the charming Frisian village of Lenten, things are picking up again after a period of calm. First, Hielke and Sietse meet a new Belgian girl named Marieke, who has recently moved in with her mother, Veerle, to a small house owned by the wealthy miser Klompsma. Next, the money-hungry real estate developer Piet Haan arrives in Lenten, with plans to build a highway and a gated community right through the village. However, this will require the demolition of much of the town, including Marieke’s house, as well as the “Woudaap” windmill, the symbol of Lenten.

When the plans leak out, protests among the residents grow so intense they even result in a violent brawl. Meanwhile, Ronnie Haan, Piet’s sadistic son, along with his buddy Sjonnie, deliberately throws Marieke, who suffers from severe asthma, into the water. Marieke becomes seriously ill and can only be cured at an exorbitantly expensive Swiss health resort. Hielke & Sietse, along with their friends, try to raise money in all sorts of ways. Among other things, they rescue a horse and enter it in a race, but their efforts are in vain; Piet Haan seems set to succeed. Only the unyielding Klompsma, who owns the most land in town, still has to sign off on the plans. The tide turns when, during a storm, the twins save a boy from drowning, unaware of the secrets he carries with him.

== Cast ==
- Koen van der Donk as Hielke Klinkhamer
- Jos van der Donk as Sietse Klinkhamer
- Maarten Spanjer as Gerben Zonderland
- Rense Westra as Veldwachter Zwart
- Nelse van Heurck as Marieke
- Els Dottermans as Veerle
- Hidde Maas as Klompsma
- Jack Wouterse as Piet Haan
- Gijs Scholten van Aschat as Mayor
- Meriyem Manders as Mayor's wife
- Jelle de Jong as Ronnie Haan (Nozem)
- Boudewijn van Duinen as Sjonnie (Nozem)
- Joep Sertons as Doctor
- Klaas Hofstra as Sjoerd Bonnema
- Dominique van Vliet as Mem Klinkhamer
- Steven de Jong as Evert (Heit) Klinkhamer
- Arjen Rooseboom as Kees "Carbid" Dijkstra
- Peter Groot Kormelink as Dijkstra (Miller)
- Joost Buitenweg as Hornstra
- Chris Zegers as Tjeerd Klompsma
- Wim Serlie as Postma (Bridge keeper)
- Hero Muller as Skipper
- Hans Anker as Advocaat twin
- Wim Anker as Advocaat twin
- Ron Boszhard as Student
- Ed Nijpels as Commissaris van de Koningin
- Boudewijn de Groot as The lonely cyclist
- Jan Douwe Kroeske as Horse race announcer

== See also ==
- List of Dutch films of 2005
