= LOL: Last One Laughing Naija =

- Genre: Reality, Comedy
- Created by: Amazon Prime
- Presented by: Basketmouth
- Country of origin: Nigeria
- Original languages: English, Pidgin English
- No. of seasons: 1
- No. of episodes: 6

Production
- Executive producer: Livespot360
- Production company: Livespot360

Original release
- Network: Amazon Prime Video
- Release: 14 July 2023 – present

Related
- Documental

LOL: Last One Laughing Naija is a Nigerian comedy reality television show based on the format of Japanese comedian Hitoshi Matsumoto's Documental. It was hosted by actor and comedian Basketmouth and was broadcast on Prime Video. The first season began airing on 14 July 2023.

== Participants ==
- Okey Bakassi
- Acapella
- Mr Funny aka Sabinus
- KieKie
- Buchi
- Dat Warri Girl
- Taaooma
- Senator
- iGoSave (Winner)
- Gandoki (Winner)
