= Bon Bini Holland =

- Theatrical release poster
- Directed by: Jelle de Jonge
- Written by: Jandino Asporaat; Ernst Gonlag; Reint Schölvinck
- Produced by: Maarten Swart
- Starring: Jandino Asporaat; Liliana de Vries; Teun Kuilboer; Sergio IJssel; Dennis Rudge; Alpha Oumar Barry; Phi Nguyen
- Cinematography: Joris Kerbosch
- Edited by: Elsbeth Kasteel
- Music by: Michiel Marsman
- Production company: Storm Post Production
- Distributed by: Entertainment One Benelux
- Release date: 10 December 2015
- Running time: 85 minutes
- Country: Netherlands
- Languages: Dutch; Papiamentu
- Box office: $4.9 million

Bon Bini Holland is a 2015 Dutch-comedy film produced by Maarten Swart and directed by Jelle de Jonge. Starring co-writer Jandino Asporaat who plays five different characters in the film, and Liliana de Vries. The film premiered in Dutch theaters nationwide on December 10, 2015

Primarily filmed in Rotterdam, South Holland, a large portion of the movie was filmed in Willemstad, Curaçao in the former Netherlands Antilles, and it features many Dutch celebrities of Surinamese and Curaçaoan descent such as Humberto Tan, Jörgen Raymann and Tania Kross. The film also features the television sketch "FC Kip" from the 'De Dino Show', for which Asporaat is famous for across the Netherlands.

Outside of the Netherlands, the film debuted in Curaçao on 17 January 2016. Asporaat travelled to his place of birth in order to attend the film's premiere. To date the film is the highest attended Dutch film in the Dutch Caribbean of all time. The film is entirely spoken in Dutch, with small portions in Papiamentu, but subtitles are available in English.

== Synopsis ==
The film begins in Curaçao, where slick Antillean Robertico (Asporaat) gets in trouble when he is unable to pay his debt to a mafia boss for using his house without his notice. He flees from the island to the Netherlands to his aunt Judeska, where he meets business man Ken Maduro (Dennis Rudge). Robertico convinces Ken to invest in his fake vacation homes on Curaçao called 'Bon Bini Bungalows'. After meeting Kens' daughter Noëlla Maduro (Liliana de Vries) he falls in love with her and is no longer sure about scamming her father.

== Cast ==
- Jandino Asporaat as Robertico, Judeska, Rajesh, Gerrie and Sydney
- Liliana de Vries as Noëlla Maduro
- Sergio IJssel as Norwin and Noltie
- Dennis Rudge as Ken Maduro
- Teun Kuilboer as Patrick
- Hans Dagelet as Mafia Boss Eddie
- Alpha Oumar Barry as Kofi
- Phi Nguyen as Ping Ping

== Awards ==
- Golden and Platin Film, Netherlands: 1
  - Golden Film: 2015
- Netherlands Film Festival: 1
  - Best Film: 2016

== See also ==
- Bon Bini Holland 2 (2018 film)
- Bon Bini Holland 3 (2022 film)
- Bon Bini: Bangkok Nights (2023 film)
