= Opduwer =

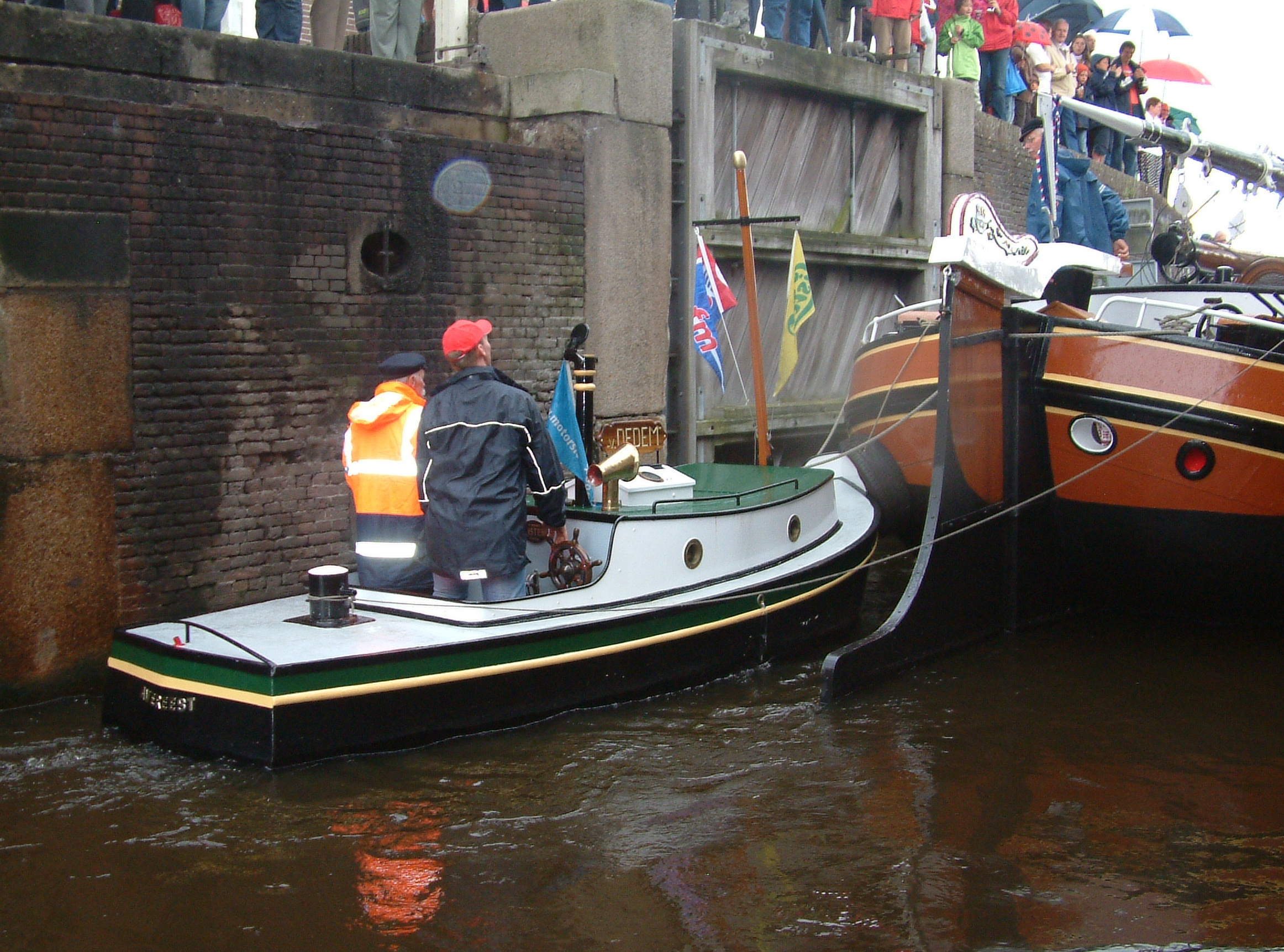
An opduwer in use at Hassailt 2007

An opduwer or opdrukker is a small tug- or towboat that was used in the Low Countries to push barges on inland waterways. Opduwers were predominantly in use in the first half of the twentieth century. During that time the internal combustion engine got adapted for inland shipping. Earlier, barges were propelled either by sail or by towing from shore by horse or manpower. Fitting an engine and propeller to an existing barge was found cumbersome however. It was easier to construct a small tugboat and use this to propel the existing barge. Opduwers were built between about 1910 to 1940. A large number survive as pleasure craft.

== Usage ==
The skipper of the barge was commonly also the owner of the opduwer so barge and tugboat formed a working pair. The barge was sometimes towed but most commonly pushed by the opduwer. The word opduwer literally translates to 'on-pusher' in English. When used as a pusher the opduwer was lashed to the stern of the barge and often controlled from the barge using a string or the boat hook. The opduwer offered additional advantages to the skipper as it could be used as a handy motorboat for various tasks and there was no noise or vibration from the engine in the barge itself.

== Construction ==
The first opduwers of around 1910 were simple wooden rowing boats that had an engine fitted. Later opduwers were built on shipyards, often from material that was left over from the construction of large ships. Early opduwers were made of either wood or steel but later only steel was used. Common sizes were from 4.5 to 6 meters long and 1.5 meters wide, weighing between 1 and 3 ton. Some were completely open boats while other opduwers featured decks and a roof to protect the engine from the weather. Common engines came from automobiles, often including the gear box. Having an engine of around 6 hp the opduwer could reach about 7 to 10 km/h.

== Sources ==
- R. Martens & F. Loomeijer. Binnenvaartschepen. Uitgeverij de Alk, Alkmaar, 1977. ISBN 9060136926
