= Bon Bini Holland 2 =

- Directed by: Jon Karthaus
- Written by: Jandino Asporaat; Jon Karthaus; Maarten Swart
- Produced by: Maarten Swart
- Starring: Jandino Asporaat; Liliana de Vries
- Cinematography: Max Malony
- Edited by: Elsbeth Kasteel
- Music by: Guido Maat
- Distributed by: Entertainment One Benelux
- Release date: 13 December 2018
- Running time: 89 minutes
- Country: Netherlands
- Language: Dutch
- Box office: $7.2 million

Bon Bini Holland 2 is a 2018 Dutch comedy film produced by Maarten Swart and directed by Jon Karthaus. Starring co-writer Jandino Asporaat who plays five different characters in the film, and Liliana de Vries. The film premiered in Dutch theaters nationwide on 13 December 2018. The film is a sequel to Bon Bini Holland. The film grossed more than $7 million and was the fourth-most visited Dutch film of 2019. It also won the Audience Award at the 2020 Netherlands Film Festival.

== Awards ==
- Golden and Platina Film, Netherlands: 1
  - Golden Film: 2018
  - Platina Film: 2018
- Netherlands Film Festival: 1
  - Audience Award: 2019

== See also ==
- Bon Bini Holland (2015 film)
- Bon Bini Holland 3 (2022 film)
- Bon Bini: Bangkok Nights (2023 film)
