= Platinum Film =

Dutch film box office achievement

- Awarded for: Box office achievements
- Country: Netherlands
- Presented by: Netherlands Film Festival; Netherlands Film Fund
- First award: 28 September 2001
- Website: http://www.platinafilm.nl/

The Platinum Film (Dutch: Platina Film) is a film award recognising domestic box office achievements in the Netherlands. It is awarded for the first 400,000 visitors of a Dutch film production. In 2003, one of the requirements for the award was raised from 200,000 to 400,000 visitors.

All films that had received the Platinum Film for 200,000 tickets sold, would also have received the award under the new criterion, with the exception of The Moving True Story of a Woman Ahead of Her Time (2001).

== See also ==
- List of films that received the Platinum Film
