= List of European television awards =

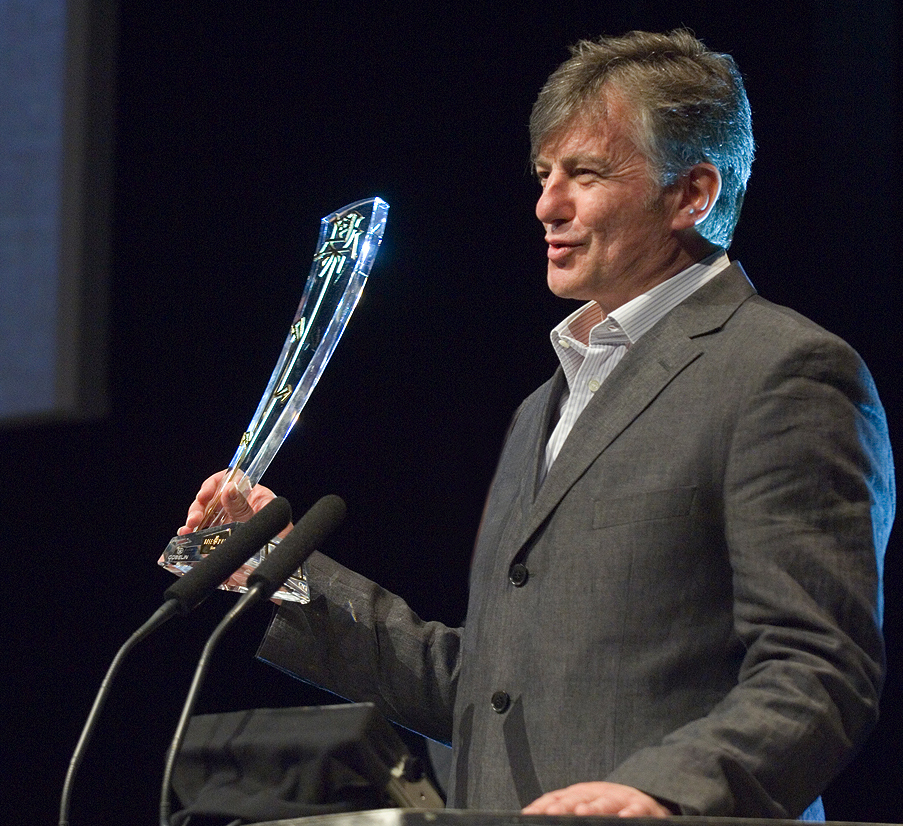
Dubravko Merlić winning Rose d'Or September 2011

This list of European television awards is an index to articles about notable awards for contributions in various fields of television in Europe. The list gives the home country of the organization that grants the awards, although the awards are not necessarily restricted to television in that country.

The countries are organized by region following the United Nations geoscheme for Europe, as shown below:

Western Europe Southern Europe Eastern Europe Northern Europe

== General ==
Award	Sponsor	Notes
European Film Academy Achievement in Fiction Series Award	European Film Academy	Fiction series
Prix Europa	Prix Europa	Best European Television, Radio and Online productions
Rose d'Or	European Broadcasting Union, C21Media	Entertainment broadcasting and programming

== Western Europe ==
Country	Award	Sponsor	Notes
Austria	Romy (TV award)	Kurier newspaper	Various categories
Belgium	Joseph Plateau Award	Flanders International Film Festival Ghent	Belgian film productions, various categories
Belgium	Vlaamse Televisie Sterren	Flemish Television Academy, Eén, VTM (TV channel)	Flemish television awards in fifteen categories
France	7 d'Or	Télé 7 Jours magazine	Excellence in Television
France	FIPA awards	Festival International de Programmes Audiovisuels	Non-fiction films for all screens and all formats
France	Jules Verne Award	Jules Verne Adventures	Excellence in exploration, environmental and cinematic achievements
France	Export award	TV France International	best-selling French television programs worldwide, in the three categories: animation, documentary and drama
Germany	Bambi Award	Hubert Burda Media	Personalities in the media, arts, culture, sports and other fields "with vision and creativity who affected and inspired the German public"
Germany	Bavarian TV Awards	Government of Bavaria	Various categories
Germany	Deutscher Comedypreis	Köln Comedy Festival	German television comedy
Germany	Deutscher Fernsehpreis	Deutscher Fernsehpreis	Award for television programming by German television channels Das Erste, ZDF, RTL and Sat.1.
Germany	Felix-Rexhausen Award	Bund Lesbischer und Schwuler JournalistInnen	Mainstream media for fair, accurate and inclusive representations of the LGBT community and the issues that affect their lives
Germany	German Soap Award	mypromi.de and VIPshare Media	German Soap Operas and Telenovelas
Germany	Goldene Europa	Saarländischen Rundfunk	Oldest German Television award for artists and entertainers, awarded from 1968 to 2003.
Germany	Goldene Kamera	Funke Mediengruppe	German film and television award
Germany	Grimme-Preis	Grimme-Institut	Television award
Germany	Heinrich Greif Prize	Ministry of Culture of the Democratic Republic of Germany	Contribution to the state's cinema and television industry.
Germany	Telestar	Das Erste and ZDF	Former German television award, succeeded in 1999 by the Deutscher Fernsehpreis.
Monaco	Golden Nymph Award	Monte-Carlo Television Festival	Excellence in international television

== Southern Europe ==
Country	Award	Sponsor	Notes
Greece	"Prosopa" Greek Television Awards	Ethnos newspaper, WIND Hellas	Best production, best drama series, best comedy series, best actor etc.
Italy	Flaiano Prizes	Associazione Culturale Ennio Flaiano	Creative writing, cinema, theater and radio-television.
Italy	Eutelsat TV Awards	Eutelsat	Thematic television broadcast across Europe, Africa and the Middle East via the satellites of Eutelsat
Italy	Prix Italia	RAI	Italian television, radio-broadcasting and website awards
Italy	Telegatto	TV Sorrisi e Canzoni magazine	Italian television award
Italy	Venice TV Awards	egta, ACT (Association of Commercial TV) and IMZ	15 categories
Portugal	Golden Globes (Portugal)	Golden Globes Academy (SIC TV and Caras magazine)	Various categories
Portugal	Prémio Autores	Sociedade Portuguesa de Autores	Various media and categories
Spain	Premios Feroz	Asociación de Informadores Cinematográficos de España	Film and television, various categories
Spain	Premios Ondas	Radio Barcelona (Cadena SER)	Professionals in the fields of radio and television broadcasting, the cinema, and the music industry.
Spain	Premios People en Español (2013)	People en Español magazine	Various categories On 5 October 2013 was announced the list of nominees.
Spain	TP de Oro	Teleprograma magazine	Mostly Spanish but also foreign television series.
Spain	Your World Awards	Telemundo (United States)	Achievements of Hispanics and Latinos in the media including TV shows, movies, music, fashion, and sports.

== Eastern Europe ==
Country	Award	Sponsor	Notes
Czech Republic	Czech Lion Award for Best Television Film or Miniseries	Czech Lion Award for Best TV Series	Best Czech television film or miniseries
Czech Republic	Czech Lion Award for Best TV Series	Česká filmová a televizní akademie	Best Czech television series
Poland	Polish Academy Award for Best TV Series	Polish Film Academy	Director, main producer and original broadcaster of the best Polish TV series
Russia	Golden Eagle Award (Russia)	National Academy of Motion Pictures Arts and Sciences of Russia	Excellence in cinematic achievements
Russia	TEFI	Russian Academy of Television	Various sectors such as television shows, notable people in the television industry etc.
Slovakia	OTO Awards	Art Production Agency	Popular culture on TV
Slovakia	Plus 7 dní Award for TV Act of the Year	Plus 7 dní	Most recognized television host of the past year in Slovakia

== Northern Europe ==
Country	Award	Sponsor	Notes
Finland	Venla award	Yle TV1, Yle TV2, MTV3, Nelonen, and Yle Fem	Replaced with the Golden Venla gala and award after 2010
Finland	Golden Venla	Finnish Television Academy (MTV3, Yle, Sanoma and SATU ry)	Best Finnish television programs, their creators and performers
Finland	Telvis	Katso magazine	Various categories
Ireland	IFTA Film & Drama Awards	Irish Film & Television Academy	Irish creative talent working in their respective fields across Film & Drama production and Television Programming
Ireland	Jacob's Award	Jacob's	First Irish television awards (until 1993)
Ireland	TV Now Awards	TV Now magazine	Favourite television moments from the previous year
Norway	Gullruten	Norske Film- og TV-produsenters forening	Annual award for the Norwegian TV industry
Norway	Komiprisen	NRK	Categories: humour, stand up, revue, and comedy
Sweden	Kristallen	Det svenska tevepriset	Official Swedish television award
United Kingdom	Asian Viewers Television Awards	Rajan Singh	Award show held in London which honours the best of Asian Television
United Kingdom	BFI TV 100	British Film Institute	Best British television programmes of any genre that had been screened up to 2000
United Kingdom	British Academy Television Awards	British Academy of Film and Television Arts	The best in television
United Kingdom	British Academy Cymru Awards	British Academy of Film and Television Arts	Welsh awards
United Kingdom	British Academy Scotland Awards	British Academy of Film and Television Arts	Scottish awards
United Kingdom	British Academy Television Craft Awards	British Academy of Film and Television Arts	Technical achievements
United Kingdom	British Comedy Awards	ITV plc	Notable comedians and entertainment performances
United Kingdom	The British Environment and Media Awards	World Wide Fund for Nature	Professional article, programme, website or campaign, written, produced or undertaken in the UK
United Kingdom	British Television Advertising Awards	British Arrows	Best moving image advertising in the UK
United Kingdom	Crime Thriller Awards	Crime Writers' Association, ITV3	Crime thriller fiction
United Kingdom	Digital Spy Reader Awards	Digital Spy (Hearst Communications)	Based on poll of the site's readers for the best moments in various categories.
United Kingdom	Greatest Britons	ITV (TV network)	Best of British talent. One-off awards (2007)
United Kingdom	Inside Soap Awards	Inside Soap	British and Australian soap operas and their actors
United Kingdom	National Reality Television Awards	IEG Global and National Media Group	Cast and crew from the reality TV industry and US
United Kingdom	National Television Awards	ITV (TV network)	Various categories voted on by the general public
United Kingdom	Nickelodeon UK Kids' Choice Awards	Nickelodeon	Various categories, voted by young people
United Kingdom	Pride of Britain Awards	Daily Mirror, Lidl, ITV, Good Morning Britain and The Prince's Trust.	British people who have acted bravely or extraordinarily in challenging situations
United Kingdom	Royal Television Society awards	Royal Television Society	Various categories
United Kingdom	Sandford St Martin Trust Awards	Sandford St Martin Trust	Excellence in religious broadcasting
United Kingdom	Screen Nation Film and Television Awards	Screen Nation committee	British and international film and television talent of African heritage
United Kingdom	The British Soap Awards	ITV (TV channel)	Best of British soap operas
United Kingdom	TRIC Awards	Television and Radio Industries Club	Achievement in television and radio
United Kingdom	TV Choice Awards	TV Choice magazine	Awarded on the basis of a public vote by readers of TV Choice
United Kingdom	Sir Peter Ustinov Television Scriptwriting Award	International Academy of Television Arts and Sciences	Television writing award for non-American novice writers under the age of 30.
United Kingdom	WFTV Awards	Women in Film and Television (UK)	Most talented women in UK film, TV and digital media.

== See also ==
- List of television awards
