= Mickey+ Shorts =

- Genre: Comedy; Fantasy; Preschool; Slapstick; Musical; Educational; Crossover
- Based on: Mickey Mouse Clubhouse+ by Rob LaDuca and Kim Duran
- Developed by: Rob LaDuca; Kim Duran
- Country of origin: United States
- Original language: English
- No. of episodes: 5

Production
- Running time: 2 minutes
- Production company: Disney Television Animation

Original release
- Network: Disney Jr.; Disney+
- Release: November 10, 2025 – present

Mickey+ Shorts is an American animated short series developed by Rob LaDuca and Kim Duran and produced by Disney Television Animation for Disney Jr. and Disney+. It serves as a sort of spin-off of Mickey Mouse Clubhouse+ and places Mickey Mouse, as well as other Disney Junior characters, at the center of the action. The short series premiered on November 10, 2025 on Disney+ and Disney Jr.

== Synopsis ==
Mickey Mouse and his friends simply want to enjoy a normal day in the Clubhouse. But something completely unexpected happens with the Mousekedoer: its screen suddenly starts to shimmer like water. This pulls Mickey and his friends into various Disney Jr. worlds, where they join the characters living there to do things together.

== Characters ==
- Mickey Mouse
- Minnie Mouse
- Goofy
- Pluto
- Donald Duck
- Daisy Duck
- Chip 'n' Dale
- Stitch
- Bluey Heeler
- Bingo Heeler
- Chilli Heeler
- Bandit Heeler
- Spidey
- Spin
- Ghost-Spider
- Sofia the First
- Wildfyre
- Woody
- Buzz Lightyear
- Jessie

== Episodes ==
No.	Title	Original release date
1	"Mickey Mouse and Stitch Do the Hot Dog Dance!"	November 10, 2025
Mickey and Minnie talk to Stitch from the live-action Lilo & Stitch remake via the television and dance the Hot Dog Dance together.
2	"Mickey Mouse and Spidey Dance Together!"	December 8, 2025
Mickey contacts Spidey and his friends, and together they perform a dance while Spidey's friends provide musical accompaniment.
3	"Mickey Mouse and Bluey Play Musical Statues Together!"	March 21, 2026
Mickey is pulled through the Mousekedoer screen and lands in the Bluey theme song. Together, they parody the theme song.
4	"Mickey + Sofia"	August 26, 2026
Mickey is playing hide and seek with Pluto, but Pluto is nowhere to be found. Suddenly, the Mousekedoer screen ripples; Mickey is pulled through it and lands in Sofia's kingdom. Together, they search for Pluto and Wildfyre.
5	"Mickey + Toy Story"	September 23, 2026
Mickey celebrates the wonders and joy of play with Woody, Buzz Lightyear and Jessie from Pixar's Toy Story.

== Production ==
As a sort of spin-off to Mickey Mouse Clubhouse+, the animation is also be outsourced to Mikros Animation, OuiDo! Productions and Saffron!c. ICON Creative Studio was commissioned to produce the animation for the fourth episode.
