= PGS Entertainment =

Children's television investment company

- Type: Private
- Industry: Children's entertainment
- Founded: 2008; 18 years ago
- Founder: Philippe Soutter; Guillaume Soutter
- Headquarters: Paris, France
- Owner: Philippe and Guillaume Soutter
- Website: www.pgsentertainment.com

PGS Entertainment is a French-Swiss privately owned investment family group dedicated to the financing and brand management of independent producers' children's television programming. PGS' broadcast and media partners include Nickelodeon, Disney Channel, Cartoon Network, and free-to-air broadcasters such as Super RTL, RAI, ABC, Pop, and Neox.

In 2022, PGS co-founded the French production company Gemma Pictures along with film producer Stéphane Célérier, assistant producer of the 94th Academy Awards winning best film CODA.

== History ==
PGS Entertainment was formed in 2008 by brothers Philippe and Guillaume Soutter. The company distributed Method Animation's reboot of Iron Man from Marvel in 2009. In 2010, PGS was named as the distributor for Method Animation's The Little Prince, based on the Antoine de Saint-Exupéry novella of the same name. PGS gained distribution rights to the Chaplin & Co TV series in 2011.

Since January 2013, PGS has owned the global distribution and licensing rights to the series The Jungle Bunch, produced by TAT Productions, which includes TV specials, series, and movies. The series was successful at the Emmy Awards. The company launched PGS H.K. Ltd, a Hong-Kong based company to represent its animation catalogue in Asia in August 2013. In October 2013, PGS acquired the global distribution rights, excluding the U.S and France, for the Alvinnn!!! and the Chipmunks TV series with Bagdasarian Productions and Technicolor Animation. The show was produced and owned by Bagdasarian Productions and created by Janice Karman.

In 2014, the company partnered with Zagtoon and Bandai on Miraculous Ladybug, Zak Storm, and Ghost Force. That same year, PGS was named as the distributor for the Super 4 TV series based on Playmobil characters and produced by Method Animation and Morgen Studios.

PGS signed a deal with the Mattel toy company to create a full line of toys for ALVINNN!!! and The Chipmunks in October 2016.

== Recognition ==
PGS won Best Distributor of the Year by TV France International in 2011 for The Little Prince, in 2013 for The Jungle Bunch, and in 2015 for Alvinnn!!! & the Chipmunks.

== Productions ==
- Alpha and Omega (TV movies based on film franchise)
- Alvinnn!!! and the Chipmunks (co-production with Bagdasarian Productions and OuiDo! Productions)
- Chaplin & Co
- The Dungeon of Naheulbeuk
- Gees
- GhostForce
- Iron Man: Armored Adventures
- I.J.L.: Heroes United (co-production with Zagtoon, Method Animation, Bandai America, OLM, Inc., Sprite Animation Studios and Nickelodeon Productions)
- The Jungle Bunch
- Leon
- The Little Prince
- Marsupilami
- Miraculous Ladybug
- Miss Moon
- Moominvalley
- Monchhichi
- Robin Hood: Mischief in Sherwood
- Sly Cooper
- Spike
- Super 4
- The Dragon Prince
- Zak Storm
