= Eurocinema =

Eurocinema logo

EUROCINEMA is a worldwide television service dedicated to Award-Winning European films and selected Eurocentric lifestyle segments.

Currently, Eurocinema is available on demand to 36 million cable and telco subscribers in the U.S. and Canada.

== Partnerships ==
On March 15, 2013, Eurocinema entered a multi-year agreement with Miramax, allowing the network to debut some of the films from Miramax's international catalog.

On October 15, 2013, Eurocinema launched a streaming video site that allows users to rent and watch movies on their desktop computers and mobile devices.

In October 2015, Eurocinema announced its ambition to launch a linear television channel called Eurocinema World during 2016.

On October 15, 2016, Amazon.com announced a deal to make a selection of Eurocinema content available on its Amazon Video streaming service under the brand Eurocinema Carte Blanche.

Additional Eurocinema partners include Samuel Goldwyn Films, MusicBox Films, Kino Lorber, Euronews, France 24, Unifrance, Alliance Francaise, French Cultural Office (French Embassy), French Consulate, and others.

== History ==
Eurocinema was co-founded and launched in 2007 by Sebastien Perioche and made its cable debut that same year. Eurocinema is a registered trademark of Eurocinema-USA, LLC.
