= Francis Nielsen =

French director of animated films

- Born: Francis Nielsen; June 19, 1947 (age 78); Annecy, France
- Occupation: Film director
- Notable work: Blackie & Kanuto; Émilie Jolie; Le Chien, le Général et les Oiseaux

Francis Nielsen is a French director of animated films, known mostly for his films Blackie & Kanuto, Émilie Jolie and Le Chien, le Géneral et les Oiseaux.

== Biography ==
Nielsen was born and raised in the mountainous region of Lake Annecy in eastern France. He began his career as a puppeteer presenting shows in local schools.

After a varied career, he joined the animation studio Idéfix (created by Rene Goscinny and Albert Uderzo, creators of the French comic and animated film series Asterix). He began his career at Idéfix as the First Assistant Director of Les 12 Travaux D'Asterix and La Ballade des Dalton.

Directing many animated commercials and TV series, he eventually became a producer in two different companies he created: Stout Studio and Rooster Studio.

He is currently director for several television series, specials and feature films. He became the first animated feature director to be in the Official Selection at the Venice International Film Festival with Le Chien...

== Filmography ==
=== Feature films ===
- Blackie & Kanuto, 2012 - produced by Baleuko (Spain), Lumiq (Italy) and Art’mell (France)
- Émilie Jolie, 2010 - produced by Marathon (France). Script by Tonino Guerra
- Le Chien, le Géneral et les Oiseaux [The Dog, The General and the Birds], 2003 - produced by Solaris (France).
  - Official section at the Venice International Film Festival; prize for the best Music
  - Official section at:
    - Marrakech International Film Festival
    - Yokohama Film Festival
    - Dubai Film Festival
    - Toronto International Film Festival

=== Television ===
- Les Canopus, 2006, TV Series - France 5.
- Boule et Bill, 2005, TV Series - TF1.
- Marx Brothers, 2001, Pilot Episode, produced by Gary Kurtz
- Butterscotch (Le Parfum de l’Invisible), 2000, TV movie - Canal+, M6. Based on the comic by Milo Manara
- Les Dieux de l’Olympe, 1999, TV Series - Canal +, Channel 5.
- Le Père Noël et son Jumeau, 1998, TV Spécial - France 2, Canal +, Canal J. Based on artwork by Boris Solotareff
- Dirty jokes, 1997, TV series - PMMP, Rooster for Canal +.
- Dad’X, 1997, TV Series - TF1.
- Once upon a time, 1996, TV Series - Canal +, France 2 and ZDF. (Finalist Emmy Awards)
- Inspecteur Mouse, 1997, TV Series - PMMP, Ravensburger for France 2, ZDF. (Finalist Emmy Award 1997.)
- Docteur Globule, 1995, TV Series - PMMP, ITV for TF1, ITV. Winner of "Best audience on ITV" in 1995 and 1996.
- Dodo, le retour, 1994 - Canal J, France2, TSR.
- David Copperfield, 1992, TV Special, Co-Director - PMMP, ASTRAL, for NBC, TF1, Canal J.

== Producer ==
- Les Dieux de l’Olympe, 1999, Série TV - Canal+, Channel 5
- Le Père Noël et son Jumeau, 1998, Spécial TV - France 2, Canal+, Canal J
- Les Sales Blagues de l’Echo, 1997, Série TV - PMMP, Rooster for Canal+
- Dodo, le retour, 1994, Série TV - Canal J, France 2, TSR
- Zoolympiques, 1991, Série TV - Canal+
