= Dr. Zitbag's Transylvania Pet Shop =

1990s animated French-British children's TV show

- Created by: Tony Barnes
- Starring: Kerry Shale; Christian Rodska; Nicolette McKenzie
- Music by: Danny Chang; Tony Barnes
- Countries of origin: France; United Kingdom
- Original languages: French; English
- No. of series: 5 (1 unaired)
- No. of episodes: 65 (13 unaired)

Production
- Producer: Philippe Mounier
- Running time: 25 min
- Production companies: PMMP; Fairwater Films; Shanghai Morning Sun Animation Company Limited

Original release
- Network: TF1 (France); CITV (United Kingdom)
- Release: 20 June 1994 – 21 August 1997

Dr. Zitbag's Transylvania Pet Shop (known as Dr. Globule in France) is a 1994–1997 French-British animated television series created by Tony Barnes and produced by Philippe Mounier PMMP and Fairwater Films, and distributed in the UK by Sleepy Kids PLC (which also produced Potsworth & Co. and Budgie the Little Helicopter) which later rebranded as Entertainment Rights before being dissolved into Classic Media (now DreamWorks Classics) and by PMMP and TF1 International in the rest of the world. 65 episodes were produced.

The show aired in the United Kingdom on ITV from 20 June 1994 to 21 August 1997, while in France it aired on TF1 from 4 September 1996. The show ran for four series. The music for the series was composed by Danny Chang and Tony Barnes.

A comic strip version of the show was included in Buster magazine from September 1994 to November 1996. The series was later repeated on Nickelodeon in the early 2000s until 2004, and had sporadic reruns from 1999 until 2001 (it was put on hiatus in 2002).

It was also aired on cable television in Australia, first airing on Nickelodeon and later on Cartoon Network.

== Plot summary ==
Dr. Zitbag is a pet shop worker who isn't very good at selling any pets, and because of this, he was fired from the local Transylvanian Pet Shop. He then decides to set up his own pet shop in an old haunted castle and finds out that he will have to share the place with a skeleton dog, Horrifido. With Horrifido now helping him out, the doctor begins use his inventions to create horrific pets to gain his profit.

== Characters ==
- Dr. Sidney Zitbag (voiced by Christian Rodska) – The series' protagonist, a mad scientist type of character who wants to become the world's best pet shop owner. After being fired from the town's only pet shop he goes on to buy an old castle from the Exorsisters and sets up his own pet shop creating new and weird pets in his laboratory, but his plans don't always work and certain mishaps do tend to happen.
- Horrifido (or Fido as he was known in life) (voiced by Kerry Shale) – The pet dog of Capt. Charles De Ghoul, the former owner of the old castle where Dr. Zitbag sets up his pet shop. Initially haunting the castle as a ghost, the doctor inadvertently uncovers the dog's old bones and the ghoul reanimates them, giving him a physical form. Horrifido is a skeleton dog with green ears shaped like a bat's wings, who becomes Dr. Zitbag's assistant. Sometimes Horrifido is seen wearing a pink bow collar around his neck.
- The Exorsisters (voiced by Nicolette McKenzie) – Dr. Zitbag's neighbours. Both ladies are vampire twins resembling the bride of Frankenstein. Every so often, Dr. Zitbag always tries to impress them both, but the two often argue with each other. Sinista has purple streaks in her hair and often dismisses Dr. Zitbag, whereas Bimbella has white streaks in her hair and is more willing to give him a chance.
- Zombunny – A zombified rabbit who never seems to move. Most of the time, he is seen with Dr. Zitbag and Horrifido, as Dr. Zitbag would use Zombunny as part of his experiments. Zitbag would often throw him aside while saying a cursory "Excuse me, Zombunny".
- Officer Deadbeat (voiced by Kerry Shale) – The local police officer of Transylvania and Dr. Zitbag's antagonist. He appears to have no neck and so his head is floating at where his would be neck should be. He has a personal grudge against Dr. Zitbag, believing that the doctor is a con-artist. If he ever arrests the doctor for good, his ultimate goal is to claim the old haunted house as a new police station, as the one he has got is very small and he often bumps his head off.
- Professor Sherman Vermin (voiced by Kerry Shale) – Dr. Zitbag's rival. Sinistra and Bimbella sometimes call him to help them, eventually making Dr. Zitbag jealous.

== Episodes ==
Twelve out of the 65 episodes of the show were released on video.

=== Series 1 (1994) ===
There was no episode broadcast on 04/07/1994 due to a showing of Dragonslayer as a result of schedule changes regarding the 1994 FIFA World Cup.

No. in series	Title	Original release date
1	"Welcome To The Transylvania Pet Shop"	20 June 1994
2	"Grime Does Not Pay"	27 June 1994
Mrs Tufthead gets a job as a cleaner at Zitbag Towers.
3	"Horrybaby"	11 July 1994
Dr Zitbag builds a Robo-Spider.
4	"Food Glorious Pet Food"	18 July 1994
Dr. Zitbag enters a pet food competition.
5	"Ants In Your Pants"	25 July 1994
"Dr. Zitbag takes drastic measures to win back dissatisfied customers."
6	"Every Dog Has Its Show"	1 August 1994
Dr. Zitbag accidentally enters his cat in a dog show.
7	"Gorilla Thriller"	8 August 1994
8	"Where Mouse"	15 August 1994
A rich vampire wants a pet were-mouse.
9	"Pirate Parrots"	22 August 1994
Dr. Zitbag searches for hidden treasure.
10	"Bungle in the Jungle"	5 September 1994
11	"Halloween Horse Race"	12 September 1994
Dr. Zitbag enters his horse into a horse race.
12	"Double Trouble"	19 September 1994
"Dr. Zitbag's attempts to impress the Exorcisters backfire badly."
13	"Triassic Lark"	12 September 1994
The children demand pet dinosaurs, which causes Dr. Zitbag and Horrifido to construct a time machine in order to travel to prehistoric times so to capture some baby dinosaurs. After minor setbacks such as travelling to before the creation of the Earth and the future, they arrive in prehistoric times, unbeknownst that Officer Deadbeat has snuck on board and has hijinks with a cavewoman. This is the first episode (also applies to every episode beyond) that was only broadcast and never commercially released.

=== Series 2 (1995) ===
No. in series	Title	Original release date
1	"Inspectre Spector"	9 June 1995
2	"Pyramid Pandemonium"	16 June 1995
"Dr. Zitbag visits ancient Egypt."
3	"Computer Bugged"	23 June 1995
4	"Kangaroo Caught"	30 June 1995
5	"Orang-Utans and Lemmings"	7 July 1995
"A lemming runs amok."
6	"Medieval Dread"	14 July 1995
"Dr. Zitbag is transported to the Middle Ages."
7	"Easter Funny"	21 July 1995
8	"Happy Horridays"	28 June 1995
"Officer Deadbeat goes on vacation."
9	"Transylvania Excess"	4 August 1995
"Dr. Zitbag helps to recapture a train load of dangerous creatures."
10	"Do You Believe in Humans?"	11 August 1995
"Will Dr. Zitbag sell up?"
11	"Loch Mess Monster"	18 August 1995
"Dr. Zitbag creates a monster."
12	"Hooray for Horrywood"	25 August 1995
13	"The Show Mustn't Go On"	1 September 1995
"Dr Zitbag organises a circus."

=== Series 3 (1996) ===
No. in series	Title	Original release date
1	"Don't Hoot, I'm Only the Piano Slayer"	11 June 1996
2	"Pinball Wizard"	18 June 1996
3	"From Transylvania with Love"	11 June 1996
"Dr. Zitbag is mistaken for a spy."
4	"Tele Nightmare"	2 July 1996
Dr. Zitbag is transported into a television.
5	"A Close Shave"	9 July 1996
Horrifido brings an alien home.
6	"Lost Wages"	16 July 1996
"Dr. Zitbag faces competition."
7	"Son of Zitbag"	23 July 1996
8	"Cranksgiving Chaos"	30 July 1996
"Dr. Zitbag invites his family to dinner."
9	"Bride of Horrifido"	6 August 1996
"Horrifido goes missing."
10	"Horrorgrammes Horrolympics"	13 August 1996
"Dr. Zitbag enters the Olympics."
11	"Slime Suspect"	20 August 1996
Dr. Zitbag sells slime.
12	"Moby Duck Billed Platypus"	27 August 1996
13	"I Was a Teenage Zitbag"	3 September 1996
"Dr. Zitbag creates a youth potion."

=== Series 4 (1997) ===
No. in series	Title	Original release date
1	"A True Fairy Tale"	29 May 1997
"
2	"For Better or For Curse"	5 June 1997
"Dr. Zitbag goes on a quest."
3	"Horrorlection Fever"	12 June 1997
Dr. Zitbag runs for mayor.
4	"Time is Big Money"	19 June 1997
5	"Happy Mishmash"	26 June 1997
6	"Tele-Zitportation"	3 July 1997
7	"A Giant Problem"	10 July 1997
8	"My Zister"	17 July 1997
9	"The Seventh Art"	24 July 1997
10	"Nothing There"	31 July 1997
11	"Doc, What's Up"	7 August 1997
12	"Terror in Transylvania"	14 August 1997
TBA	"Dances the Hula"	21 August 1997

=== Series 5 (unaired) ===
The following episodes never aired on CITV.

Title
"End of Season"
"Rose Button"
"Scare Tactics"
"Hydrious Monster"
"Zlotys Galore"
"Bluebald"
"Dr. Zitbag Against Silly Holmes"
"Mad Scientific Shenanigans"
"The Ridiculous Journey"
"Horrible Horrorscopes"
"Anarchic Arctic Antics"
"Word of Horror"
"Forever Fiends"
