= Fairwater Films =

- Industry: Film
- Headquarters: Cardiff, Wales, United Kingdom
- Key people: Tony Barnes (producer, director, screenwriter); James Driscoll (executive producer, screenwriter)

Fairwater Films is a British animation studio based in Cardiff.

== Notable staff ==
- Tony Barnes (producer, director, screenwriter)
- James Driscoll (executive producer, screenwriter)

== Selected filmography ==
- Hanner Dwsin (1985)
- The Shoe People (1987-1988)
- Satellite City (1988)
- Dr. Zitbag's Transylvania Pet Shop (1994-1998)
