= Blackie & Kanuto =

- Film poster
- Directed by: Francis Nielsen
- Written by: Angel E. Pariente, Segundo Altolaguirre, Gorka Sesma
- Produced by: Fabio Massimo Cacciatori, Eduardo Barinaga, François Cohen-Séat, Davide Tromba, Karmelo Vivanco
- Music by: Xavier Berthelot
- Production companies: Baleuko; Lumiq Studios; Film Investment Piedmont; Art'Mell; Talape
- Distributed by: Lumiq Studios (Italy); Zootrope Films; Art'Mell (France); Barton Films (Spain)
- Release dates: May 2012 (Cannes Film Festival); February 15, 2013 (Spain)
- Running time: 81 minutes
- Countries: Italy; France; Spain
- Languages: Basque; Spanish; French; Italian

Blackie & Kanuto (also titled Head over Hooves, Black to the Moon 3D, and Pup) is a 2012 animated comedy adventure film directed by Francis Nielsen and produced by Baleuko, Lumiq Studios, Film Investment Piedmont, Art'Mell and Talape.

The production was presented at the Cannes Film Festival in May 2012.

In Italy, Turin, Blackie & Kanuto's preview was on December 4, 2013.

== Premise ==
Blackie is a black sheep who lives, flawed and proud, on a farm where she is famous for combining everything. But this is not enough for Blackie: she wants to go to the Moon. Blackie and Kanuto, a sheepdog in love with the sheep, set off on an adventure where they meet many curious characters, including two birds known for the singing TV reality show they come from, an opera-singing cow, and a fashion-conscious wolf.

== Production ==
The film project is a production of Baleuko, Lumiq Studios in Turin, Film Investment Piedmont, Art'Mell and Talape.
