= The Shoe People =

British animated television series (1987–1993)

- Created by: James Driscoll
- Written by: James Driscoll; Nigel Crowle
- Directed by: Clennell Rawson
- Voices of: Philip Whitchurch; Jo Wyatt (1992)
- Narrated by: Philip Whitchurch
- Countries of origin: United Kingdom; China (season 2)
- Original languages: English; Welsh
- No. of series: 2
- No. of episodes: 52

Production
- Executive producer: James Driscoll
- Producer: Tony Barnes
- Editor: Rob Francis
- Running time: 5 minutes (10 minutes series 2)
- Production companies: Fairwater Films; FilmFair; TVB International Ltd; Jade Animation; The Shoe People Ltd; S4C (1989)

Original release
- Network: TV-am; CITV; S4C; The Children's Channel
- Release: April 19, 1987 – March 22, 1993

The Shoe People is a British animated television series which was first broadcast in the United Kingdom in April 1987 on TV-am. It went on to be broadcast in sixty-two countries around the world.

It was the first animated series from the Western world to be broadcast in the former Soviet Union in 1989 and became so popular there that it sold over twenty-five million Shoe People books.

The Shoe People was created by James Driscoll, who got the inspiration for the show from noticing that the style and appearance of people's shoes revealed things about their owners' personalities. He then wondered what stories these shoes could tell about themselves when they were new and when they had gradually worn out. The show's characters were designed by Rob Lee, an illustrator from Cardiff who had previously designed the characters for TV series such as SuperTed and Fireman Sam.

The theme song was written and sung by Justin Hayward of The Moody Blues.

== The story ==
In a shoe repair shop, a shoe mender tries to repair all the shoes he gets, but sometimes he cannot repair them all. He does not throw away these shoes; instead, he puts them in the back room of the shop.

These join the other shoes and boots he could not bear to throw away and the ones whose owners never came back for them. This room has a secret. Every night when the shoe mender locks up the shop, he makes sure the back room door is shut. This door does not shut very easily and when he slams it shut, the strangest thing happens. A large cloud of dust from the room fills the air and when it settles, the shoes and boots come to life, the back wall disappears and Shoetown appears, where all the shoes and boots live.

The characters were voiced by Philip Whitchurch and Jo Wyatt (Olwen Rees in Welsh). Jo voiced the female characters in the sequel series, The New Adventures of the Shoe People, while Phillip voiced the male characters. Jo's father Martin also produced a vinyl record of the series as well as owning Bright Music, the company that produced the music for the series.

== Characters ==
=== Original characters ===
P.C. Boot
The policeman of Shoetown who lives in 'Shoe Street Police Station'. He is dedicated to his duty of maintaining law and order. He is very formal and likes to over-explain things, much to the annoyance of others. He talks with a little bit of a lisp. He is voiced by Philip Whitchurch.
Charlie
A clown shoe who lives on the corner of Shoe Street. He lives in a circus tent called 'The Little Big Top', and likes to juggle and perform magic tricks. He also likes to make people laugh. The other Shoe People have to be careful when talking to him, as he either pulls funny faces, or squirts water at them through the fake flower on his hat. He has many unusual ideas that are useful for helping others in Shoetown. It is unknown how Charlie came to live in Shoetown, but he is happy. Charlie is also very friendly, caring, fun, generous, and one of the kindest residents of Shoetown. He is always there to cheer his friends up and many times has helped save his friends from danger and other problems. He is also an excellent trapeze artist. He is voiced by Philip Whitchurch.
Trampy
A worn out Irish boot with a hole in his toecap who is a bit scruffy. He lives next door to Charlie in a house with a crooked chimney, called 'Tumbledown House', which has not been painted or maintained in years and has an overgrown garden. He loves to relax and spend time in his natural garden. He is good-natured and friendly and likes to keep the peace between the other inhabitants of Shoetown. He likes to go on walks in the country with Margot and Baby Bootee and tell them stories. He also likes having his friends from the countryside drop by for tea. He has a soft spot for Margot. It has been speculated that Trampy – being Irish and dishevelled – is actually a gypsy or traveller who has left his travelling roots behind. He is voiced by Philip Whitchurch.
Sergeant Major
An army boot who lives in 'Drill Hall' and still thinks he is in the army; he was in the Foot Regiment. He likes everything to be neat and tidy and shouts a lot. The grass in his garden is mown in perfect lines, he even measures the width of them, and all the plants stand to attention. The trouble is, he lives next door to Trampy, and gets very annoyed when the overgrown garden next door grows into his garden. At least once a day he complains to Trampy about it, but never takes any real action. He often calls Charlie "Stupid Clown", but he always comes to watch his circus act. He hates being called Sarge. Despite his grumpy, bossy manner, he does have a soft side which he rarely shows. He is voiced by Philip Whitchurch.
Margot
A pink ballet slipper who lives in 'Swan Lake Cottage' and loves to dance. She looks after Baby Bootee. When she first arrived at the Shoe Repair Shop, she had a big tear in her side and she thought she would never dance again. Luckily for her, the Shoe Repairer had other ideas and fixed her until she was good as new. She was then put back into the shop window to wait for the little girl who brought her in, to collect her, but she never came back. Now she has a new life in Shoetown and she loves to put on shows for everyone. The show hints that Trampy has a crush on her. She is voiced by Philip Whitchurch in the 1987 series and Jo Wyatt in the 1992 series.
Wellington
A blue Wellington boot who loves being wet and lives in 'Puddle Villa'. He loves water so much that he has drilled holes in the guttering of his house and stands underneath it when it rains. He hates being called a Welly. He is voiced by Philip Whitchurch.
Baby Bootee
A pink baby shoe with a yellow pacifier in her mouth who is looked after by Margot at Swan Lake Cottage. She does not do much, apart from loving the teddy bear that Charlie won for her at the fair. She is voiced by Philip Whitchurch in the 1987 series and Jo Wyatt in the 1992 series. Mischievous, curious, and playful as any baby can be, she can also be very naughty.
Sneaker
A sneaker who likes to sneak around and take things without asking people, hence why he looks like a stereotypical burglar and talks in a sneaky tone of voice. He also likes to do odd jobs for people. There is a wanted poster of him on the outside of Shoe Street Police Station. He has his own yard and his catchphrase is, "Sneaker by name, sneaker by nature!" He is voiced by Philip Whitchurch.
Gilda Van Der Clog
A yellow Dutch clog with a red floral design who lives in a windmill and needed Charlie and P.C. Boot's help to remove a bird's nest from her windmill sails, and then made a picnic for all the Shoe People after their mystery tour. She is voiced by Philip Whitchurch in the 1987 series and Jo Wyatt in the 1992 series.
Flip Flop
A brown flip-flop who went to the seaside with Trampy, Sergeant Major, Baby Bootee and Charlie. When she got swept away by the tide, Charlie (with his shoelace) and Trampy pulled her to safety on the rocks. She is voiced by Philip Whitchurch in the 1987 series and Jo Wyatt in the 1992 series.
Mr. Potter
The station master of The Shoetown Railway Station who rang up P.C. Boot to warn him about a tree that had fallen onto the railway tracks and nearly cancelled the other Shoe People's train journey before Charlie bought an elephant named Bertha over from the Shoetown Zoo to help remove the tree. He is the only original character who doesn't make any appearances in The New Adventures of the Shoe People. He is voiced by Philip Whitchurch.
Sid Slipper
An elderly green slipper who likes to go to the park with the other Shoe People. In the episode 'Where's Baby Bootee', he falls asleep under a tree while keeping an eye on Baby Bootee and while Margot was buying ice cream. In The New Adventures of the Shoe People, he owns his own garden and vegetable patch. He is voiced by Philip Whitchurch.
Marshall
A cowboy boot who loves listening to country music, loves watching Western films and does a safekeeping around Shoetown. He is voiced by Philip Whitchurch.

=== New characters ===
Beverley
A beautiful shoe from Los Angeles who likes cheerleading and wears a gorgeous blonde ponytail in her hair and earrings on her sides. She is voiced by Jo Wyatt.
Bebop and Alula
A 1950s couple who love to dance to rock and roll music. Bebop has his hair styled like Elvis Presley and Alula has her hair up in a ponytail. They appeared in the original series but weren't named until The New Adventures of the Shoe People. They are similar to Danny and Sandy from the musical Grease. Bebop is voiced by Philip Whitchurch and Alula is voiced by Jo Wyatt.
Morris
A miner who works underground Shoetown. He loves digging and even has a light on his hard hat. He is voiced by Philip Whitchurch.
Sir Toby Boot
The world's best actor who loves anything to do with the theatre. He always has a good personality and likes to perform the works of Shakespeare. He is voiced by Philip Whitchurch.
Dr. Merryweather
The Shoetown doctor who takes care of the residents in Shoetown and makes them feel better. He is voiced by Philip Whitchurch.
Sacha
A Russian boot. He is voiced by Philip Whitchurch.
Farmer Fred
A farmer who works on the farm. He is voiced by Philip Whitchurch.
Coach
He likes sport, especially baseball. He is voiced by Philip Whitchurch.
Officer Malone
A cop from New York City who works with P.C. Boot. When he first arrived in Shoetown, he arrested most of the Shoe People for what he thought was troublemaking, however he let them go after P.C. Boot told him that the real trouble makers were the Boot Boys. He is voiced by Philip Whitchurch.
The Boot Boys
A trio of roller skates sometimes referred to as The Rollerskate Gang. Their names are Spike (the leader), Ace (the silly one), and Rowdy (the dopey one). They love to cause trouble in Shoetown and are always up to no good. They are voiced by Philip Whitchurch.

== Original episodes ==
The first series consisted of 26 episodes which were broadcast on TV-am as part of its 'Wide Awake Club' from April 1987.

#	Title	Summary	Air Date
1	Can You Keep a Secret?	The introduction of the Shoe People and their places in their world of Shoetown.	19 April 1987
2	Sergeant Major	Sergeant Major has a penchant for smartness and drill practice, and has trouble with his neighbour, Trampy.	26 April 1987
3	A Day at the Seaside	Some of the Shoe People take a trip to the seaside, but Flip Flop gets washed out to sea and Charlie and Trampy must rescue her.	3 May 1987
4	Trampy	Trampy is kind and generous, but has an untidy lifestyle.	10 May 1987
5	Trampy's Birthday Surprise	P.C. Boot, Margo, Trampy and Charlie celebrate Trampy's birthday with a picnic in the countryside.	17 May 1987
6	Margot	Margot is the ballerina at Swan Lake Cottage, and performs a garden ballet for her friends.	24 May 1987
7	Charlie	Charlie is the clown who lives at the Little Big Top. It also turns out that Sergeant Major wants a word with Charlie, who apparently squirted him with his flower once too often.	31 May 1987
8	A Rainy Day Problem	It's a rainy day in Shoetown, and Charlie, Sergeant Major and Wellington must help Margo get across a large puddle so she can get to the Shoetown Dance School.	7 June 1987
9	Tea at the Little Big Top	Charlie invites Trampy, Margo and Sergeant Major for tea at his circus tent.	14 June 1987
10	Fun and Games in the Park	The Shoe People enjoy a day at the park and Charlie amuses everyone with his tricks. However, Sergeant Major is hard for him to impress.	21 June 1987
11	Charlie's Car	Charlie brings home a new clown car that can do lots of different tricks.	28 June 1987
12	P.C. Boot to the Rescue	Charlie and Margo take a boat ride on the lake, but things go wrong when their boat gets stuck in a mud bank. It's up to P.C. Boot to save the day.	5 July 1987
13	Trampy's Dream	Trampy falls asleep while reading the newspaper in his chair near the fireplace and dreams about the other Shoe People cleaning up his untidy house and garden. When Trampy wakes up, he realises it was all a bad dream.	12 July 1987
14	The Fair Comes to Shoetown	The Shoe People enjoy the fun of the rides and stalls at the annual fair. Margo and Bootee ride the ferris wheel, but the two of them get stuck on the ride when the mechanism on the wheel gets jammed. Luckily, Charlie comes to their rescue.	19 July 1987
15	Delay at Shoetown Railway Station	A tree falls across the track at the railway station, and Mr. Potter, the station master, calls on the help of P.C. Boot and Sergeant Major. In the end, however, it is Charlie who comes up with the right solution.	26 July 1987
16	Sneaker	A simple job for Margot by Sneaker (that is clearing off the leaves on Margot's thatched roof with Charlie's tightrope and Trampy's ladder) brings a warning from P.C Boot.	2 August 1987
17	The Windmill Has Stopped	A bird's nest is on Gilda's windmill. It's down to P.C. Boot and Charlie to find a solution for the sails to get moving again.	9 August 1987
18	A Job for Wellington	After a burst pipe in Shoetown Police Station, there is only one person fit enough to fix the leak and help P.C. Boot escape.	16 August 1987
19	Margot's Mirror	On a surprise visit to Margot's house, Charlie breaks a mirror by accident. The only way to replace it is to find one of his own mirrors from the circus, which does not have the normal "mirror" effect.	23 August 1987
20	The Missing Jumble	The Shoe People hold a charity fete with different stalls. However, Trampy's jumble has been stolen. Or has it?	30 August 1987
21	The Paper Chase	After laying a paper trail for P.C Boot, Margot, Charlie and Baby Bootie, Trampy settles down for an afternoon nap. However Sergeant Major interrupts the trail mistaking the paper for litter, until he finds Trampy who explains about the trail.	6 September 1987
22	Where's Baby Bootee?	Margo, Sid Slipper and Baby Bootee spend a day at the park, but Baby Bootee goes missing and it's up to Margo to find her.	13 September 1987
23	Trampy Mows the Lawn	Trampy offers to mow Sergeant Major's lawn but all does not go to plan, which leaves the lawn looking like a pile of spaghetti. Charlie has an ingenious plan to help Trampy cover up the mistake.	20 September 1987
24	The Great Sledge Race	The residents of Shoetown gather on the hill for the Annual Great Sledge Race. With a number of different sledges, the competition is as close as it's ever been, but one resident doesn't have a sledge at all.	27 September 1987
25	The Mystery Tour	The Shoe People go on a mystery tour, but on the way to their destination, their bus gets lost due to Sneaker taking a signpost, which happened to be broken. Luckily, the tour ends well when the Shoe People finish their trip with a picnic outside the windmill.	4 October 1987
26	Our Very Own Circus	The circus is supposed to come to Shoetown, but plans fall through when the show is cancelled due to illness. Luckily, Charlie saves the day when he comes up with the idea of putting on a circus show with all the other Shoe People performing the different acts.	11 October 1987

== The New Adventures of the Shoe People ==
A second series, The New Adventures of the Shoe People, showcasing many of the new characters, was made by FilmFair, for TV-am in 1992.

Episode No.	Title	Summary	Air Date
01	Charlie the Pilot	Charlie turns a load of Sneaker's old junk into a life-sized, rubber band-driven aeroplane. Unfortunately, his co-pilot, the hapless Wellington, winds the propeller the wrong way, and aerobatic mayhem ensues over the skies of Shoetown.	
02	A Quiet Day in Shoetown	P.C. Boot has the day off, so the naughty Boot Boy Gang decide to create a little havoc in Shoetown. New York cop stand-in, Officer Malone, manages to arrest everybody except the real culprits, leaving quite a big problem for P.C. Boot on his return.	
03	Injun Trouble	Smoke-signals have been spotted over Shoetown Wood, and so brave Marshall deputises a reluctant Wellington and Charlie to go looking for Indians. Their quest is disrupted, however, by Farmer Fred's missing turkeys and Sneaker's furtive activities.	
04	You're in the Army Now!	Responding to Sergeant Major's taunts. Margot and the Shoetown girls challenge the Shoetown boys to a race to sort out who is the best once and for all. Surprises are in store, however, as the route decided upon is the Army assault course!	
05	Ghosts in the Windmill	It is midnight in Gilda Van Der Clog's beloved windmill, and eerie sounds and spooky goings-on are in progress. Summoning up all their courage, Shoetown Police Officers P.C. Boot and Officer Malone decide to investigate...	
06	Racing Uncertainties	The Shoe People and the Boot Boy Gang hold a cross-country race, which the cheating Rollerskates intend to win - more by foul means than fair. But then as if by some strange coincidence, Farmer Fred's prize bull joins the fray.	
07	From Russia With Snow	In the midst of the hottest weather Shoetown has ever known, Newcomer Sacha longs for the coolness of his native Russia. Trampy and the other Shoe People try to cheer him up using, of all things: a packet of Soap Flakes.	
08	Sid's Marrow	Every year, Sid Slipper wins the Giant Marrow Competition at the Annual Shoetown Flower Show. But the greedy Boot Boys have their beady eyes on the prize also. Will they succeed in cheating their way to success or will Sid Slipper win the day again?	
09	Sergeant Major Loses His Voice	Poor Sergeant Major is distraught. He finds he can't officiate at his platoon's passing-out parade because he's lost his voice. Well-meaning Trampy And Wellington attempt to help him - with hilariously disastrous consequences.	
10	All At Sea	The Shoe People find themselves marooned on a lighthouse during a ferocious storm at sea. They find that the lighthouse is not working properly and other ships are in danger of crashing onto the rocks. All seems lost until Morris Miner finds a solution to the problem.	
11	Coconut Crazy	Things go astray in the mail from time to time - even in Shoetown. A package is wrongly delivered to the Boot Boy Gang's address, the contents of which helps them to concoct a mischievous scheme to win coconuts at the annual fair.	
12	Wellington On Ice	It is winter, and the Shoe People are happily skating on the frozen ice of Shoetown Lake - that is until poor Wellington falls through. But how can urn full of hot coffee possibly save him? Only Charlie the Clown and Margot the Ballet Slipper have the answer.	
13	Marshall's Round Up	Farmer Fred's pesky goats and sheep are causing much trouble in Shoetown. This presents Marshall with a golden opportunity to re-live the glory days of the Wild West by organising a rootin'-tootin' round-up.	
14	The Show Must Go On	Everyone's favourite actor, Sir Toby Boot, puts on a prestigious production of Hamlet at Shoetown Theatre. Unfortunately he has made the grave mistake of putting Charlie the Clown in charge of special effects. The result: a rendering of Shakespeare that Shoetown's inhabitants will never forget.	
15	Beehive Yourself	The mean-minded Boot Boy Gang hatch a plot to steal Sid Slipper's honey-laden beehive - and live to regret it!	
16	Back in the Old Ball Game	The crowds amass at the playing field for Shoetown's very first baseball game. Scheming skaters the Boot Boy Gang have their eyes on the Grand Prize - even if they have to steal it to get it.	
17	Wellington the Babysitter	Margot leaves Baby Bootee in the incapable hands of wacky Wellington while she pops off for the afternoon. If she only knew the mayhem they would create with a motorised skateboard while she's away. Maybe she'd stay in with Baby Bootee for ever?	
18	Sergeant Major's Spot of Bother	Sergeant Major is looking a little out of sorts today - he's developed a spotty disease which ha speckled him from head to toe. So it's off to the Shoetown surgery to see a baffled Doctor Merryweather... But there's more to these spots than meets the eye!	
19	The Purple Ploople	A strange and unusual being from outer Space has invaded Shoetown, and is terrifying the inhabitants... But appearances can be deceiving, as Sir Toby is about to find out.	
20	Ice Cream Sundae	Ever-resourceful Sneaker lashes up an impressive-looking ice-cream making machine out of bits and bobs lying around his cluttered yard. But he has reckoned without the Boot Boy Gang's intervention and as soon as he switches it on, Shoetown is in danger of literally drowning in vanilla-flavoured ice-cream.	
21	Marshall's Bar-B-Q	The selfish old Boot Boy Gang haven't been invited to the Shoe People's barbecue. And so, with the aid of a book of magic spells they spitefully try to wreck the great occasion.	
22	Dr. Merryweather's Day Off		
23	Rock and Rolled	Shoetown's favourite gardener, Sid Slipper, is having great trouble with moles in his garden. But Wellington is having even bigger trouble - with a runaway steamroller - much the consternation of rest of the Shoe People.	
24	Fools for Fitness	Margot decides that the other Shoe People are unfit and should enroll immediately into a fitness class. However, Wellington and the others are not so sure if this such a good idea, especially when they discover that a grinning Sergeant Major is in charge!	
25	Shoes in Space	In their state of-the-art rocket ship. the Shoe People travel to the distant planet Blobboboloo in older to catch some Blobobolian space-fish. But instead of fish, it's a hard task put upon Wellington that almost ends up with the chips!	
26	Anchors Aweigh	The sun is bright, the sky is blue, and the Shoe People have decided to take up yachting for the day. But as they swiftly discover, sailing on any boat crewed by Charlie and Wellington is just asking for trouble!	

== American dub ==
The Shoe People was broadcast in the United States on Nickelodeon as a segment on their pre-school TV series Eureeka's Castle. The series was redubbed with American accents and a female narrator, and a female voice actress was added to the voice cast.

== Changes by Nick Jr. ==
When all 26 episodes of The Shoe People in 1987 aired on Nick Jr. UK from 2001 to 2002, the Fairwater Films/The Shoe People Ltd copyright in 1987 was replaced by FilmFair Ltd, with the restoration handled by CiNAR Studios UK. FilmFair's copyright can be seen at the end of each episode on The Shoe People Complete Series DVD. The same FilmFair copyright screen can also be seen on the 1992 version of the said programme, also on Nick Jr. UK, when they aired the later series in spring 2002.

== VHS releases ==
Since their broadcasts on TV-am in 1987, Tempo Video (through its 'Children's Stories' sub-label and distributed by MSD Video Ltd) released five separate VHS tapes between 1987 and 1989, including three 40 minute videos with eight episodes on each one and a couple of 30 minute videos as part of activity packs with six episodes on each of them.

VHS video title	Year of release	Episodes
The Shoe People (V9026)	5 October 1987	"Can You Keep A Secret"; "Sergeant Major"; "A Day at the Seaside"; "Trampy"; "Trampy's Birthday Surprise"; "Margot"; "Charlie"; "A Rainy Day Problem"
The Shoe People - P.C. Boot to the Rescue (V9061)	1 February 1988	"Tea at the Little Big Top"; "Fun and Games in the Park"; "Charlie's New Car"; "P.C. Boot to the Rescue"; "Trampy's Dream"; "The Fair Comes To Shoe Town"; "Delay at Shoe Town Railway Station"; "Sneaker"
The Shoe People - Shoe Town Stories (V9114)	5 September 1988	"The Windmill Has Stopped"; "A Job for Wellington"; "Margot's Mirror"; "The Missing Jumble"; "The Paper Chase"; "Where's Baby Bootee?"; "The Great Sledge Race"; "Trampy Mows the Lawn"
The Shoe People - The Mystery Tour (V8805)	5 September 1988	"The Mystery Tour"; "Our Very Own Circus"; "Sergeant Major"; "Margot"; "Sneaker"; "Trampy's Dream"
The Shoe People - Trampy's Birthday Surprise (V8812)	February 1989	"Trampy's Birthday Surprise"; "A Rainy Day Problem"; "Fun and Games in the Park"; "The Fair Comes to Shoe Town"; "Trampy"; "Sneaker"

Between 1989 and 1990, W.M. Collins Video released two special edition VHS tapes.

VHS video title	Year of release	Episodes
The Best of The Shoe People (92562)	4 September 1989	"Charlie's Car"; "Trampy's Dream"; "The Fair Comes to Shoe Town"; "Delay at Shoe Town Railway Station"; "Sneaker"; "Can You Keep A Secret"; "A Day At the Seaside"; "Margot"; "A Rainy Day Problem"; "Where's Baby Bootee?"; "The Great Sledge Race"; "Trampy Mows the Lawn"
The Shoe People; Bumper Video (94012)	2 April 1990	"The Mystery Tour"; "Sneaker"; "Trampy Mows the Lawn"; "Margot's Mirror"; "Trampy's Birthday Surprise"; "Trampy's Dream"; "Sergeant Major"; "The Windmill Has Stopped"; "A Day at the Seaside"; "Charlie's Car"; "The Missing Jumble"; "Our Very Own Circus"; "Where's Baby Bootee?"

In late 1989, MSD Video Ltd released a single video containing eight stories from the series which was distributed by W.M. Collins for and on behalf of Avon Cosmetics.

VHS video title	Year of release	Episodes
The Shoe People: Favourite Stories (73832)	4 September 1989	"Can You Keep A Secret?"; "Sergeant Major"; "A Day at the Seaside"; "Trampy"; "The Windmill Has Stopped"; "A Job for Wellington"; "Margot's Mirror"; "The Missing Jumble"

On 5 November 1990, Wienerworld Presentations released two combined videos with 13 stories on each.

VHS video title	Year of release	Episodes
The Shoe People; Bumper Special (WNR 2015)	5 November 1990	"Can you Keep a Secret?"; "Trampy"; "Trampy's Dream"; "Delay at Shoe Town Railway Station"; "PC Boot to the Rescue"; "The Mystery Tour"; "A Job for Wellington"; "Margot"; "a Rainy Day Problem"; "Charlie"; "Where's Baby Bootee?"; "Charlie's Car"; "The Fair comes to Shoe Town"
Great Adventures of the Shoe People (WNR 2016)	5 November 1990	"A Day at the Seaside"; "Sergeant Major"; "Trampy Mows the Lawn"; "Sneaker"; "The Missing Jumble"; "Trampy's Birthday Surprise"; "Margot's Mirror"; "The Paper Chase"; "Tea at the Little Big Top"; "The Great Sledge Race"; "Fun and Games in the Park"; "The Windmill has Stopped"; "Our Very Own Circus"

There were no video releases of The New Adventures of the Shoe People (1992 series). The first series is available on DVD. Other products included books and plush toys along with a special edition chocolate bar issued by Cadbury.

== Title by country ==
- English: The Shoe People (1987–1988)
- Welsh: Pobl Tresgidie (1989)
- Croatian: Cipelići (1993)
- Russian: Город башмачков
- Slovenian: Šolenčki
- Icelandic: Skófólkið
- Czech: Škrpálkov
- Serbian: Ципелићи
- Poland: W Bucikowie

== International broadcast ==
- TVAM, The Children's Channel and S4C – United Kingdom
- ABC, ABC Kids, Ten Network and Nickelodeon – Australia
- Nickelodeon - USA (redubbed)
- TV2 – New Zealand
- La Cinq – France
- TVP3 Regionals - Poland

== Computer game ==
A children's educational computer game, First Class with the Shoe People, was released for various platforms in 1991 by Gremlin Interactive.
