= Marcelino Pan y Vino (TV series) =

- Genre: Action; Adventure; Family
- Based on: Marcelino by José María Sánchez-Silva
- Directed by: Santiago Moro; Xavier Picard
- Opening theme: "His Name is Marcelino Pan y Vino"
- Ending theme: "His Name is Marcelino Pan y Vino"
- Composers: Josep M. Bardagi; Danny Chan
- Countries of origin: France; Spain (season 1); Japan (season 1); Italy (season 1); Mexico (season 1)
- Original languages: English; Spanish; French
- No. of seasons: 3
- No. of episodes: 78

Production
- Executive producers: Francisco Guitart; Philippe Mounier; Koichi Motohashi
- Producers: Santiago Moro; Xavier Picard; Masao Kurosu
- Running time: 23 minutes
- Production companies: PMMP; TF1; VIP Toons (season 1); RAI (season 1); TVE (season 1); Televisa (season 1); Nippon Animation (season 1)

Original release
- Network: TF1 (France); TVE2 (Spain); Rai Uno (Italy); Canal de las Estrellas (Mexico)
- Release: 15 October 2000 – 1 June 2011

Marcelino Pan y Vino is a French animated television series.

In 2000, VIP Toons (Spain), PMMP and TF1 (France), and Nippon Animation (Japan), in association with Televisión Española (Spain), RAI (Italy), and Televisa (Mexico), created the first television series adaptation of the 1953 story Marcelino by José María Sánchez-Silva, that had a film adaptation in 1955 as Miracle of Marcelino. The first 26-episode run (2000-2001) was translated into several languages, including English, French, Spanish, Tagalog, Portuguese, and Italian, and became a success across Europe. An additional 26 episodes were made in 2004 and aired in Germany in 2006.

== Characters ==
=== Protagonists ===
- Marcelino - the main protagonist of the series.
- Candela
- Shadow
- Father Prior
- Brother Andrés (Brother Pap)
- Brother Lorenzo (Brother Proverb)
- Brother Thomas (Brother Ding-Dong)
- Brother Bernardino (Brother Bird)
- Leo
- Gisela

=== Antagonists ===
- Duke of Mostro - the main antagonist of the series.
  - Pieru
  - Martin
  - Lucas - the hunter.
- Rufo
- Ivan
- Casio
- Constanble

=== Others ===
- Chickens
- Boni
- Lupo and Lupa
- Doctor Mateo
- Marina
- Uro
  - Maria
- Thursday

== Episodes ==
=== Season 1 (2000–2001) ===
1. Home
2. The Africa Fly
3. The Duke's Breakfast
4. The King of The Forest
5. The Chicken of Golden Egg's
6. The Little Duchess
7. A True Gentleman
8. The Grand Hunt
9. The Animal's Rebellion
10. Just This Once
11. The Acrobat
12. Thursday
13. And All Were Children
14. The Magician's Watch
15. Casio, The Lumberjack
16. Doctor Mateo
17. A Trap In The Forest
18. Reme, The Hen
19. A Question Of Size
20. The Hot-Air Balloon
21. The Dark Underworld
22. My Friend, The Ghost
23. At Sea
24. The Deserted Island
25. The Boy Of The Thousand Moons
26. A Very Special

=== Season 2 (2004) ===
1. The Return of Marcelino
2. The Gypsy Witch
3. The Nasty Nephew
4. Heavenly Honey
5. Marcellino Counter-Attack
6. Horn Free
7. The Big Show
8. School Days
9. A Happy Event
10. When I Grow Up
11. The Flood
12. Distant Cousins
13. Aches And Pains
14. The Mad Dog
15. Treasure Hunt
16. Night of The Meteorite
17. The Duke's Bullfight
18. The Sparrows
19. The Traitor
20. The Easter Surprise
21. The Invisible Man
22. Ines The Silly Goose
23. Athalia
24. Dangerous Games
25. The Show Must Go On
26. The Fakir's Snake
