= Forest Friends =

Animated television series

- A scene featuring three characters from this series
- Also known as: Les Copains de la Forêt
- Created by: Philippe Tierney
- Directed by: Bernard Le Gall
- Voices of: Tony Beck; Christophe Hespel; Frédéric Meaux; Sébastien Hébrant; Fanny Roy; Marie-Line Landerwijn; Maia Baran; Stéphane Flamand; Stéphane Excoffier; Lucie De Grom; David Scarpuzza; Bernard Faure; Carole Baillien
- Composer: Cyril de Turckheim
- Countries of origin: France; United Kingdom
- Original languages: English; French
- No. of seasons: 1
- No. of episodes: 52

Production
- Producer: Philippe Mounier
- Running time: 13 minutes
- Production companies: Timoon Animation; PMMP

Original release
- Network: TF1; RTÉ2; ABC
- Release: April 17, 2006 – September 4, 2007

Forest Friends (French: Les Copains de la Forêt) is a French animated television series initially broadcast on TF1, and later rerun on French children's network TiJi. Along with the CGI series The Odd Family, this was one of the first shows produced by Timoon Animation (now as OuiDo! Productions), a company created by Philippe Mounier. 52 episodes were produced.

Several of the show's tie-in books have been written by Valérie Baranski, the screenwriter for another TF1 cartoon, The Bellflower Bunnies.

== Synopsis ==
In the series, a wildfire has driven away many species of forest animals, who reluctantly must live uneasily with each other. Seven young open-minded survivors, taught by their mentor the Old Oak of the Forest, step forth to prove that the animals, no matter how different they are from each other, can live and work together as a community in peace and friendship. Frequently the rats cause trouble and inconvenience for the animals.

== English voice cast ==
- Jodi Forrest
- Barbara Weber-Scaff
- Sharon Mann-Vallet
- Matthew Géczy
- Paul Bandey
- Allan Wenger
- David Gasman

== Characters ==
- Jeff is an athletic squirrel who used to live in Squirrel City and now lives in a cabin not far from the bakery. He has a crush on Naomi.
- Naomi is a mouse who loves to read books and has a crush on Jeff.
- Achille is a boar and good friend of Jeff who can sometimes be a bit of a show off. He lives in a wooden board house
- Danny is a fox who is quite a prankster and a scaredy cat.
- Gladys is a bear who loves to eat food and has some sort of love-hate relationship with Danny due to her fear of foxes.
- Martin and Zoe are a twin rabbit siblings who always stick together and take situations cautiously.
- Old Oak is a Living Tree who teaches the children all about the forest and the advantage of working together. He is Titan's father. He originated from an oak tree struck by a shooting star and Titan spawned as a sapling near one of his roots. From the sixth episode onwards he wears glasses.
- Titan is a Living Tree derived from a Cherry Tree and son of Old Oak. He is friends with Jeff and others.
- Ratasha and Rascal are a rat siblings who live in a bare dusty part of the forest in an outhouse and they cause trouble for others.
- Jeff's Parents: The Father is named Jack and works as the speaker and leader of the village council meetings. The mother is named Jenny and works as a librarian of the public library.
- Naomi's Parents: The Mother is named Maggie and the Father is named Boris. They both work as doctors.
- Sophia is Naomi's older sister. Danny once had an unrequited crush on Sophia.
- Achille's Parents: The Father named Roger does carpentry and the Mother named Margery does sculpting.
- Lily is Achille's baby sister.
- Danny's Mother is named Meryl and works as a newscaster for the local Gazette
- Danny's Father is named Joe and works as a traveling actor.
- Didoo is Danny's baby brother.
- Gladys's Parents: The Father named Billy works as a baker and the Mother named Milly works in a grocery store.
- Zoe's and Martin's Parents: The father named Jimmy is a gardener. The mother named Rose looks after the house and in episode 6 teaches the children.
- Ratasha's and Rascal's Parents: The mother is impatient and bossy sort and the father is an indifferent and careless sort.
- Tanja is a squirrel, who likes Jeff and makes Naomi sad and jealous, and Naomi sees her like a rival for Jeff's affection.
- Leon is a wolf who gets lost from his parents during snow season. He is accused by some of the adults of wanting to eat them even though he's nice.
- Basher is a deer who appears in once in episode 35. Jeff and Danny fight over him and he becomes friends with both of them.

== Episode list ==
No.	Title	Original release date
1	"Back to school"	April 17, 2006
The group go for their first day at school in the forest. Jeff, Naomi, Achille, Danny, Gladys, Martin and Zoe all meet each other but then Ratasha and Rascal cause trouble and make them late for school.
2	"The Castle"	TBA
Jeff and his group help Achille to cut lumber for his father, but the Rats lumber collecting for Mother Rat's personal castle escalates a dispute between Achille and his friends. They clear up the matter by taking the castle away.
3	"The Magic Star"	TBA
Titan feels insulted by his friends, so he tries to gain their appreciation with a made up story about having magic powers. After saving Jeff, Achille and Titan from danger, Old Oak briefs the group about his origin.
4	"The Brass Band"	TBA
Jeff and his group are going to practice their brass music, but then they go after Ratasha and Rascal who took Gladys' bugle and tarts. Titan finds the bugle they discarded and the group head back for a rehearsal.
5	"Bush School"	TBA
A new boar Anthony comes to stay. Achille befriends him, but Anthony's father forces them to go bush school. Anthony's Father's arrogance gets the better of him, when he starts a forest fire, but Jeff and his group manage to put it out.
6	"Early Retirement"	TBA
Recently Old Oak has gotten some fatigue and the village think he is not fit to teach anymore. Martin and Zoe's mother becomes the substitute teacher, but her teaching is tiring everyone out and eventually herself.
7	"Old Oak's Notebook"	TBA
Danny feels left out of the group due to maths problems. Ratasha and Rascal take advantage of this and help Danny cheat his way in maths with Old Oak's stolen notebook. Danny soon confesses this and the group teach the rats a lesson.
8	"The Swamp Monster"	TBA
Somebody has sabotaged the Beavers' dam. The beavers are convinced that the rumoured Swamp Monster has done it and flee their homes. Absence of the beavers allows mosquitos to freely breed. Jeff and Naomi find out the rats were behind this.
9	"Achille's Talent"	TBA
Achille is distressed from lack of talent to paint. He picks up a talent for sculpture and the whole village develops a need for his talent especially to counter the birds that threaten the village orchard.
10	"The Magic Honey"	TBA
Danny's competition of mushroom picking results in Old Oak being poisoned. Only the Honey of Rafflesia can cure him. Danny embarks on a quest to find it, the others joining in. With Titan's help they get the honey and cure Old Oak.
11	"Come back Danny"	TBA
Danny offers Sophia a trip far away to prove he is a grown up. Naomi convinces Sophia to stay while the others discourage Danny from carrying out his plans by making grown up tasks seem complicated.
12	"Good Manners"	TBA
Naomi develops a sympathy for Ratasha and attempts to change her with good manners. Ratasha accepts in order to steal Old Oak's magic star. When she realises her mother intends to abandon the Rat family, she tells Gladys. After that, Ratasha goes back to her regular lifestyle.
13	"Leon the Hungry Wolf"	TBA
The group is met by a lone lost wolf named Leon. The group plays with him while Margery cares for him. Martin and Zoe search for Leon's parents. Their absence gets Leon in trouble with the village, making him run away, but the group manages to reunite him with his parents.
14	"True Friends"	TBA
Titan breaks one of his root legs and cannot go swimming. Jeff's group are more interested in having fun than helping Titan, but Achille is thinking about Titan a lot and prompts the others to make it possible for Titan to join in the fun.
15	"Titan is a Bad Loser"	TBA
Due to his bad grades, Titan mopes a lot about losing, so Gladys and Achille try to make him feel like a winner. They succeed, but this has not helped. Ultimately, they show Titan that winning is not everything.
16	"A parent in school"	TBA
When Roger ends up doing Achilles' homework badly, Old Oak enrolls him to school. Roger proves to be a show off and does not take it seriously. The whole affair upsets Achille, so the group send for their own parents to motivate him and the group do private lessons with Roger.
17	"I want my Papa"	TBA
Danny's father returns and Danny's quality time with his father makes him to forget his other appointments, then he feels unwanted and goes on his own. Both family and friends help reassure Danny and his mother spends more time with him than before.
18	"Achille's Strange Behaviour"	TBA
Achille grows fond of a young toad he names Sticky and secretly keeps as his personal pet. His secrecy causes him to act oddly and tells fibs and finally get in trouble. When his friends find out the truth he finally releases Sticky.
19	"The Dam"	TBA
Jeff becomes attracted to Tanya, much to Naomi's chagrin. Naomi finds some disturbing problems with a rock dam about to collapse. Jeff and his group's failed attempt to take care of the problem prompts the adults to finish the job.
20	"The Rebel Twins"	TBA
Martin and Zoe show off their vast knowledge a bit too much, and they feel a strong urge to change and copy Sophia's habits. This fails to get their friends attention, but they show the twins that they don't have to prove anything.
21	"United we Stand"	TBA
In a school scavenger hunt the group is divided into two teams with irregular partners, much to Jeff and Naomi's dismay. The teams don't do very good teamwork with their disagreements. When both teams arrive at the final stage and get the trophy they rejoin each other.
22	"Head of Class"	TBA
With Old Oak preoccupied with one workshop, Achilles is voted as head of the moulding workshop. Achille tries to be responsible and nice to his friends, but they take advantage of his good nature. When Danny gets stuck in plaster, Achille feels guilty and runs away, but his friends convince him to return.
23	"Stone Crazy"	TBA
Achilles discovers an Amethyst crystal. This rouses greed on the grown ups to find more and it becomes adopted as a currency, but the grown ups neglect their regular duties. When shortages of Amethyst start, quarrels arouse. Life goes back normal after rescuing Billy from a mine collapse.
24	"The Treasure of Friendship"	TBA
After a failed history lesson, Danny and Achille decide to trick Jeff with a fake treasure map to Renardus the Brave's Treasure. At the end of this wild goose chase, Jeff and Naomi pass the spot and get lost in a cave. Achille and Danny rescue them and they all find Renardus' treasure trove.
25	"The Big Spring Ball"	TBA
Everyone is preparing for the Big Spring Ball. Gladys is discontented with herself, so she tries to be like Naomi and Zoe. When that does not work Naomi helps her to accept herself. Titan does not want to attend the ball because he cannot dance, but Gladys asks him to be her partner.
26	"Brother and Sister for Life"	TBA
When Zoe joins Gladys and Naomi for playtime, Martin feels lost without her. After a mishap, Zoe does not want to go with Martin anymore. Naomi, feeling responsible for this, assists the twins to make up and get together again.
27	"The Picnic"	TBA
The group starts a picnic on their day off. Their picnic food gets lost in the river, so the group go foraging for picnic food. Gladys finds her honey cake but won't share it. When she finds the other picnic food, she is in need of rescuing from her friends.
28	"So Long Raspys"	TBA
The springtime is giving a scent enough to drive the rats mad that they move out, but their absence results in a garbage pileup that brings a stink to the village. Jeff's group goes to work to bring the rats back.
29	"Achille the Unlucky"	TBA
Various mishaps affect Achille, who strongly believes that it is caused by some evil curse from Old Oak's class story. Devastated, he isolates himself from everyone. Jeff, Naomi and Titan use the last part of Old Oak's class to boost his confidence and stop believing in the curse.
30	"Father's Day"	TBA
Danny saves Ratasha during a heckling chase and she develops an unrequited crush on him. Danny is feeling left out for Father's Day due his father's long absence. When the group tries to help Danny, a misunderstanding crosses Ratasha, but she fixes everything and Joe arrives.
31	"Permission"	TBA
The group gets their parents permission to have a slumber party outside, except Naomi who gets upset. The group's camping is not as enjoyable as they thought it would be and they go back to the comfort of their homes.
32	"A Star is Born"	TBA
Naomi is particularly pleased with her dancing role. She becomes popular, but then she notices some setbacks and she worries about making a wrong move in the performance, but a formerly envious Sophia defends her talent.
33	"Big Brother Blues"	TBA
Danny is entrusted by his mother to look after Didoo. The job is harder than he imagined. Danny takes Didoo to the lake hoping to take a break with his friends. Danny gets upset, but his friends and Diddo rekindle their relationship.
34	"A Charming Monster"	TBA
Upon exploring a cave, the group accidentally awakens a young bat called Albertine. As the group gets to know her, Danny and Martin become competitive for her affection, becoming a disaster as they awaken Albertine's whole family, but she manages to get them to make up.
35	"Santa's Sleigh"	TBA
A new student, a deer named Basher visits Old Oak's class. As Christmas preparations are being made Danny and Jeff compete to get Basher's attention. Then they try to help Basher's Christmas wish come true, and Danny and Jeff shortly make up.
36	"Playing Games"	TBA
Danny beats Jeff in a game of shells, making Jeff become competitive, making up his own game Splooshing with his own rules, much to the annoyance of his friends. Jeff and Danny finally put a stop to their competition.
37	"Danny's Lie"	TBA
The group is practicing for the cone ball tournament, but Danny fools them with a made story to cover his absence. Because of this an accident ruins their practice for the tournament. Danny's father manages to mend the matter and the group wins the tournament.
38	"Titan Finds His Place"	TBA
The group plays a game but Titan does not feel appreciated. Achille tries to help find the best role for him in any game: as a referee.
39	"Jeff Has Lost His Love"	TBA
Naomi becomes sick of Jeff's bossiness and she does not want to see him again. Gladys tries to reason with her to no avail. Jeff sets off on a quest in a snowstorm to win Naomi back, but she comes to him instead.
40	"SOS Parents"	TBA
Gladys is distressed because her parents are arguing over her. The word spreads to Jeff's group, who make a plan to bring Gladys' parents together. The plan almost backfires but both Billy and Milly show Gladys they always love each other.
41	"Naomi's Secret Admirer"	TBA
Jeff is under the impression that Naomi has some other admirer and grows jealous and unhappy. Naomi has been preparing a play. Jeff later realises how he lacked confidence in Naomi.
42	"Danny the Brave"	TBA
Jeff teases Danny about constantly getting scared, but then decides to assist him in plucking his courage. This gets Jeff dangling below a rickety bridge, but Danny executes a rescue plan.
43	"The Big Mistake"	TBA
Roger entrusts Achille to safeguard a rare yellow flower, but in an argument with Danny he accidentally squashes it. The group searches the forest for another one of its kind. After finding several of these flowers, it turns out that Achille had squashed a common flower.
44	"Stung Pride"	TBA
Danny tries to get back at Jeff for all his bragging by discovering his fear. Danny tricks Titan into telling him that bees are Jeff's worst fear. Danny manages to damage Jeff's pride. Titan makes it up to Jeff, by curing him of his fear.
45	"Girls vs Boys"	TBA
Sick of the boys gossiping, the girls are about to split from the group. Titan tries to settle the dispute with a competition. Rascal and Ratasha get in the way and capture the boys, but the girls come to the rescue.
46	"Go Fly a Kite"	TBA
Jeff and his friends follow Old Oak's instructions even though they don't make direct sense. They soon find out when Jeff, Naomi, Martin and Zoe go flying high in the sky by kite and get lost in the woods. Achille, Danny and Gladys search and manage to find them.
47	"Jeff's Cousin"	TBA
Jeff's lookalike cousin Gideon arrives. Unlike Jeff he does not brag and he outdoes Jeff, making Jeff envious. During a sack race, Ratasha and Rascal steal the trophy, but Jeff and Gideon scare them into giving it back.
48	"Switching Roles"	TBA
The group become rebellious about their parents. In response they decide to neglect their children's needs. This act fails and children and parents challenge each other to switch roles. As Naomi breaks down, Sophia gets both parents and children to make up.
49	"Bad Neighbours"	TBA
Roger is being very bossy and rude towards his neighbours. Ratasha and Rascal worsen the quarrels between Roger and Jimmy as payback for Roger's earlier scolding. Eventually Roger apologises to both rats and rabbits for his meanness.
50	"Who Broke Into our Treehouse"	TBA
Jeff's group have their own treehouse to themselves, but they find that someone broke into it. Jeff, Ratasha and Rascal are suspected but quickly put of out the picture. Jeff's group discovers that the magpies used the treehouse to stash things.
51	"Stop Complaining Gladys!"	TBA
Gladys begins to irritate her friends with her complaints against small problems. Ratasha decides to play a spiteful trick on the group, but Gladys earns their respect as she makes a sacrifice to thwart that trick.
52	"The Magic Mask"	TBA
The group celebrate their award ceremony. Danny's desire for glory becomes a dilemma when he gets his mask or Naomi's book. By the end of the day Danny cheers up when he hears that his father is coming to take him on vacation.
