= Export Award =

Former French television awards show

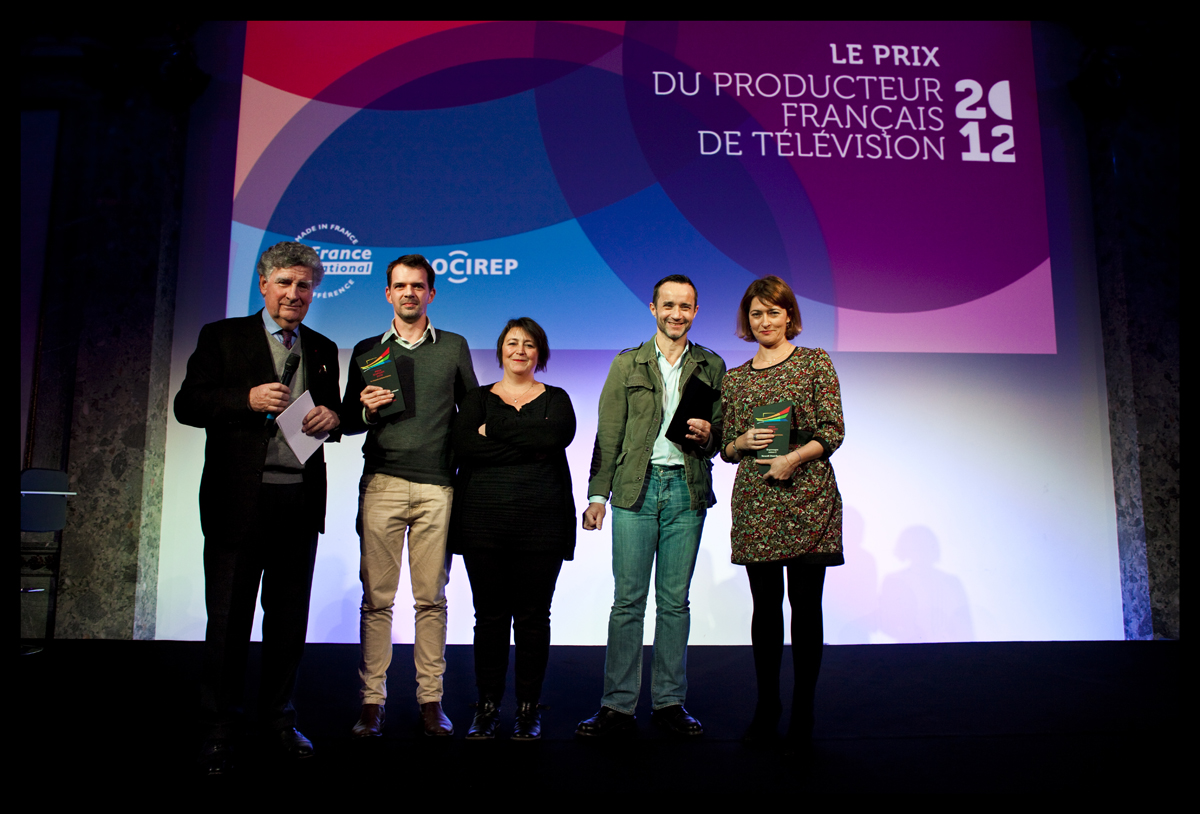
Four people awarded the Export Price of 2012

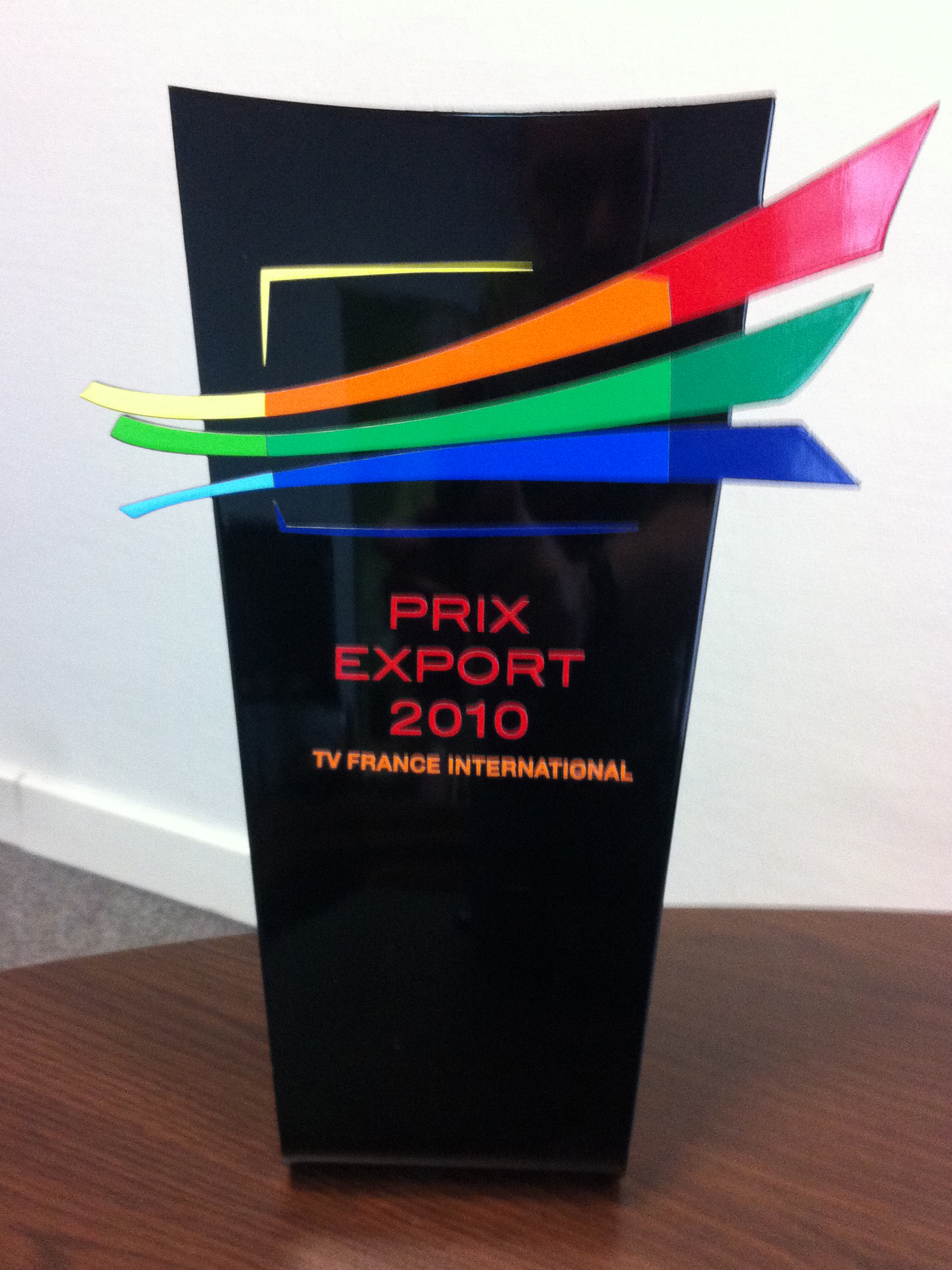
The Export Award Price of 2010

From 2004 to 2020, the French association TV France International organized the annual Export Award that rewarded the best-selling French television programs worldwide, in three categories: animation, documentary and drama. This award highlighted both the economic and cultural impact of program exports and paid special tribute to the dynamic of French companies in charge of their international distribution.

The 10th Export Award was directed by Xavier Gouyou-Beauchamps, President of TV France International, during a prestigious soirée celebrating the PROCIREP Producer's Prize in Paris on December 9, 2012. The 9 nominees were chosen according to the volume and level of their international sales. The winners among them were chosen by a panel of 12,000 professionals of the television sector. The 2013 Export Award winners were:

- animation: The Jungle Bunch - Back to the Ice Floe (distributed by PGS Entertainment)
- documentary: Apocalypse - Hitler (distributed by France Télévisions Distribution)
- and fiction: The Returned (distributed by Zodiak Rights)

Previous winners:

Année	Animation	Documentaire	Fiction
2014	Oggy et les Cafards (Xilam Animation)	Les Rebelles du Foot (ARTE France)	Fais pas ci, fais pas ça (AB International Distribution)
2013	Les As de la Jungle: Opération Banquise (PGS)	Apocalypse: Hitler (France TV Distribution)	Les Revenants (Zodiak Rights)
2012	Minuscule (Futurikon)	Waste: The Nuclear Nightmare (ARTE France)	Spiral (season 3) (NeweN Distribution)
2011	The Little Prince (PGS Entertainment)	Qaddafi, Our Best Enemy (Illégitime Défense)	Braquo (Zodiak Rights)
2010	64 Zoo Lane (season 2) (Millimages)	Apocalypse: The Second World War (France Télévisions Distribution)	A Family Murder Party (France Televisions Distribution) & The Secrets of the Volcano (NeweN Distribution)
2009	SamSam (MoonScoop)	Becoming a Woman in Zanskar (ZED)	Mafiosa (AB International Distribution)
2008	Ozie Boo! (Cyber Group Studios)	Jaglavak, Prince of Insects (ZED)	Spiral (NeweN Distribution)
2007	Shuriken School (Xilam Animation)	Signé Chanel (Arte France)	Lagardère (NeweN Distribution)
2006	Code Lyoko (MoonsSoop)	Becoming a Man (ZED)	Dolmen (Marathon – Zodiak Rights)
2005	Totally Spies! (Marathon)	Homo Sapiens (France Télévisions Distribution)	Old Goriot (AB International Distribution)
2004	Cedric (Dupuis Audiovisuel)	Dark Side of the Moon (Pour du Jour)	Saint-Tropez (Marathon)

== Notes & references ==
France TV International: website
