= European Film Academy Achievement in Fiction Series Award =

European Film Academy award

The European Achievement in Fiction Series Award has been awarded annually by the European Film Academy since 2019. As a new category, the academy introduces the European Achievement in Fiction Series Award, to reflect the changes in the cinematic landscape. German series Babylon Berlin is the first recipient of the prize. EFA chairwoman Agnieszka Holland said: “For younger generations, series are a much more popular format than theatrically released movies and if we want to remain relevant for our audiences, the EFAs need to reflect that.”

== Winners and nominees ==
Year	Result	English title	Director	Screenplay	Country of Production	Language	Production company
2019 (32nd)	Winner	Babylon Berlin	(Germany) Henk Handloegten (Germany) Achim von Borries (Germany) Tom Tykwer	(Germany) Henk Handloegten (Germany) Achim von Borries (Germany) Tom Tykwer	Germany	German	X Filme Creative Pool, Beta Film, Sky Deutschland, Degeto Film
2019 (32nd)	Special Mentions	Chernobyl	(Sweden) Johan Renck	(United States) Craig Mazin	United States, United Kingdom	English	Sister Pictures, The Mighty Mint, Word Games
2019 (32nd)	Special Mentions	Les Misérables	(United Kingdom) Tom Shankland	(United Kingdom) Andrew Davies	United Kingdom	English	BBC Studios, Lookout Point, CZAR TV
2019 (32nd)	Special Mentions	Sex Education	(United Kingdom) Ben Taylor (United Kingdom) Kate Herron	(United Kingdom) Steve Ackroyd (United Kingdom) David Webb (United Kingdom) Calum Ross	United Kingdom	English	Eleven Film
2019 (32nd)	Special Mentions	Bordertown	(Finland) Miikko Oikkonen	(Finland) Miikko Oikkonen	Finland	Finish	Fisher King Production, Federation Entertainment
2019 (32nd)	Special Mentions	The New Pope	(Italy) Paolo Sorrentino	(Italy) Paolo Sorrentino (Italy) Umberto Contarello	Italy, Spain, France	English, Italian	Wildside, Haut et Court TV, Mediapro
2019 (32nd)	Special Mentions	Bodyguard	(France) Thomas Vincent (United Kingdom) John Strickland	(United Kingdom) Jed Mercurio	United Kingdom	English	World Productions
