= Chaplin & Co =

Animated television series

- Genre: Comedy; Slapstick
- Based on: The Tramp created by Charlie Chaplin
- Developed by: Julien Charles
- Directed by: Cyril Adam; Julien Charles; Oliver Derynk
- Voices of: Mike Pollock; Sharon Mann; Matthew Geczy; Tiffany Hossterrer
- Theme music composer: Nicolas Richard; Franck Roussel
- Opening theme: Chaplin & Co. Theme
- Ending theme: What a Wonderful World
- Composers: Nicolas Richard; Franck Roussel; Nicholas Varley
- Countries of origin: France; India
- Original language: None (no dialogues)
- No. of seasons: 1
- No. of episodes: 104

Production
- Executive producer: Rita Street
- Producers: Aton Soumache; Nathanaël Karmitz; Alexis Vonarb; Cedric Pilot; Vincent De Mul
- Running time: 6 minutes
- Production companies: Method Animation; MK2 TV; DQ Entertainment; Fabrique D’Images

Original release
- Network: International Syndication; France 3 (France)
- Release: 31 December 2011 – 1 January 2012

Chaplin and Co. is an animated silent comedy television series that originally aired in France on France 3. The series is produced by DQ Entertainment. It depicts Charlie Chaplin's iconic character The Tramp, with his friends as the Kid. Unlike him, this is his first CGI-animated series that is completely silent comedy. 104 episodes were produced.

== Premise ==
Set in the 21st century, Charlie Chaplin is a shy, awkward and touching man dressed all in black, wearing a mustache and bowler hat, who is never separated from his cane.

== Broadcast ==
The series premiered in France on 31 December 2011 on France 3 followed by Boomerang and La Trois. In India, the series was dubbed in Hindi and premiered on Pogo on 7 July 2012. In Spain the series was Broadcast on Clan.

== Episode list ==
- Episode 1: The Passenger Parcel
- Episode 2: Periwinkle
- Episode 3: Skate!
- Episode 4: The Basket of Discord
- Episode 5: The Plastic Symphony
- Episode 6: Not Fast and Not Furious
- Episode 7: Love Is Organic
- Episode 8: Who Goes Piano, Go Lumbago!
- Episode 9: The Haunted House
- Episode 10: Royal Hot Dog
- Episode 11: The Rebel Wardrobe
- Episode 12: Chaplin 2.0
- Episode 13: Love at First Sight in the Department Store
- Episode 14: A Nanny in Hell!
- Episode 15: Duel in the Dust
- Episode 16: Plastic Trap
- Episode 17: Macadam TV
- Episode 18: The Shooting Range
- Episode 19: The Guardian Has Dog
- Episode 20: Lesson of Seduction
- Episode 21: Misunderstanding
- Episode 22: Love on a Platter
- Episode 23: The Wandering House
- Episode 24: Ring Girl!
- Episode 25: Park Safari
- Episode 26: Pump Up
- Episode 27: Winning Service
- Episode 28: Everyone is Looking for Their Mobile
- Episode 29: Hands Off My Teeth!
- Episode 30: Turn the Carousel!
- Episode 31: Christmas Turkey
- Episode 32: The Photo Booth
- Episode 33: Private in Bollywood
- Episode 34: Pranks and Tricks... Me!
- Episode 35: Hidden Camera
- Episode 36: A Dinner and a Candle
- Episode 37: The Cost of the Rabbit
- Episode 38: The Battle of the Park
- Episode 39: The Tow Truck
- Episode 40: Double Life
- Episode 41: The Intruder
- Episode 42: Rabbit on the Menu
- Episode 43: A Suspicious Package
- Episode 44: The Caddy Race
- Episode 45: The Elevator
- Episode 46: A Day at the Museum
- Episode 47: The Casting Call
- Episode 48: A Dream Promotion
- Episode 49: The Handyman
- Episode 50: Duel on the Floor
- Episode 51: The Museum Keeper
- Episode 52: The Valet
- Episode 53: The Opening
- Episode 54: Laser Duel
- Episode 55: Hand Games
- Episode 56: Superstition
- Episode 57: Love at the Beach
- Episode 58: The Music Lesson
- Episode 59: The Fines Chicken
- Episode 60: Steering Wheel Ace
- Episode 61: The Rebel Fuse
- Episode 62: Code of Conduct
- Episode 63: Refueling
- Episode 64: Express Pressing
- Episode 65: Clicks and Slaps
- Episode 66: Unfair Competition
- Episode 67: The Poker Ace
- Episode 68: A Little Slice of Heaven
- Episode 69: The Art of Seducing
- Episode 70: A Baseball Game
- Episode 71: The King of Cleaning
- Episode 72: A Scent of the Forbidden
- Episode 73: A Wire Arrest
- Episode 74: Odds and Ends
- Episode 75: The Autograph
- Episode 76: Sushi Madness
- Episode 77: Take turns
- Episode 78: Right On!
- Episode 79: Coffee Promotion
- Episode 80: Fashion Victim
- Episode 81: Proper Dress Required!
- Episode 82: Micmac at the Laundromat
- Episode 83: Home Cinema
- Episode 84: Full Back
- Episode 85: The Next Bus
- Episode 86: The Kite
- Episode 87: High Surveillance
- Episode 88: Vertigo of Love
- Episode 89: The Treasure Hunt
- Episode 90: A Perfect Ad
- Episode 91: Let's Stay Zen!
- Episode 92: The Customer Is King
- Episode 93: Don't Let Your Dog Hang Out!
- Episode 94: The Bike Taxi
- Episode 95: A Great Ballet Blow
- Episode 96: A Tailored Role
- Episode 97: The Hiccup Attack
- Episode 98: The Preview
- Episode 99: Alternative route
- Episode 100: Thief Despite Himself
- Episode 101: The Flea Trainer
- Episode 102: Paranoia
- Episode 103: DJ Kakophony
- Episode 104: One Dog Can Hide Another

== Production ==
Development for the modern-day adaptation of Charlie Chaplin was announced in January 2010, when French film production/distribution company & arthouse film studio MK2, who had brought the global distribution & representation rights to the Charlie Chaplin film library from the Chaplin family’s estate company Roy Export Company Establishment back in 2001, had teamed up with Paris-based French animation production studio Method Animation and Indian entertainment & animation studio DQ Entertainment, to produce a new CGI-animated TV short series based on Charlie Chaplin's character The Tramp, the new series would bring Charlie Chaplin alongside its character The Tramp for the modern day audiences with DQ Entertainment would handle animation services for the series.
