= Philippe Mounier Marketing Production =

Philippe Mounier Marketing Production (PMMP)
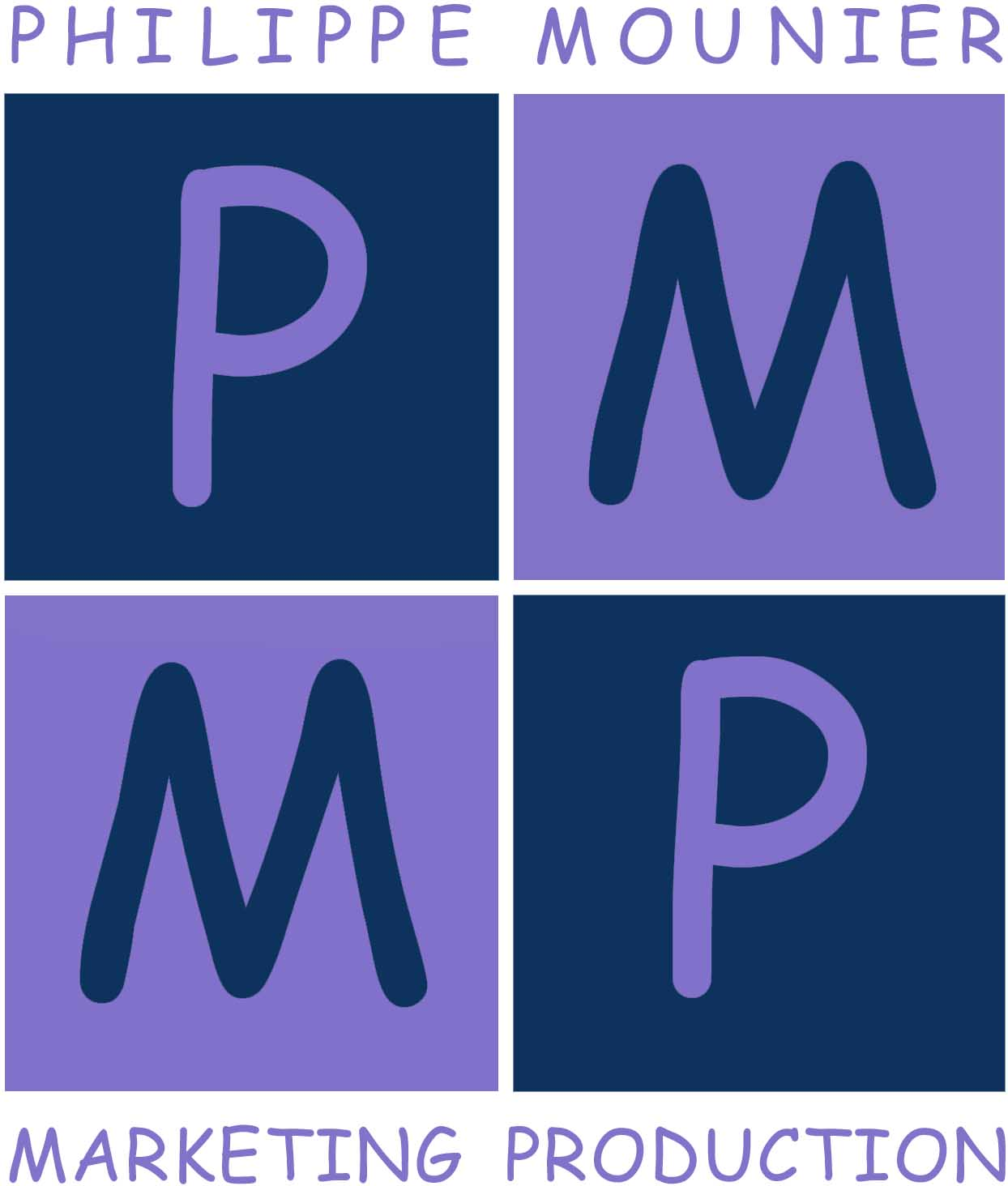
- Industry: Animation
- Founded: 1986
- Headquarters: Paris, France
- Key people: Founder: Philippe Mounier
- Website: pmmp.fr

Philippe Mounier Marketing Production (PMMP) is a French production company founded by Philippe Mounier in 1987 specializing in animation, and educational contents.

== Productions ==
=== Series ===
Title	Year	Network	Notes
Costa	1991–1992	TF1	
Dr. Zitbag's Transylvania Pet Shop	1994–1997	CITV (United Kingdom); TF1 (France)	In association with ITV, TF1, TVE & Ravensburger Film & TV.
Dirty Jokes	1995	Canal+	Based on the cult strips by famous French cartoonist Philippe Vuillemin.
Pim	1997–1998	TF1	first Franco-Korean co-production with Samsung Entertainment.
Inspector Mouse	1999	France 2	based on the work of Ralph Steadman, in association with France 2 & Ravensburger Film & TV. Finalist Emmy Awards 1999.
Delook & Sharpy	1999–2000	TF1	
Doc Eureka	2000	France 3	coproduction with France 3 and La Cinquième. Finalist Emmy Awards 2001
Marcelino Pan y Vino	2000–2011	TVE (Spain); TF1 (France); RAI (Italy)	in association with VipToons, Nippon Animation for RAI, TVE and TF1.
Odd Family	2005	TF1	coproduction with SamG Animation, Timoon Animation for TF1. First sitcom produced in 3D.
Forest Friends	2006–2007	TF1	in association with TF1 and Timoon Animation
Boowa & Kwala	2008		in association with ITV GRANADA and UpToTen.com
My Giant Friend	2009–2010	France 3 Canal J	coproduction with SamG Animation and Timoon Animation for France 3, Canal J. Series made in 3D.

=== Films ===
Title	Year	Notes
David Copperfield	1993	co-produced with ASTRAL INC and NBCNP for NBC.
Second Generation	2016	co-produced with Stephen Films.
Loulou de Montmartre	TBA	in development with Project Images with the support of Centre National du Cinema et de l'Image Animée

=== Short films ===
- The Doobles by Philippe Tierney
- The Little Mermaid by André Lindon

=== Documentary ===
- The Secret Story of the beginnings of the conquest of space by André Annosse

=== Various ===
- L'Ami Baba lesavoirpourtous.org
- B.A.Ba TV lesavoirpourtous.org
- Je Parle donc Je Suis ACIA
