= Unifrance =

Association promoting French cinema in France and abroad

- Founded: 1949
- Type: Film
- Headquarters: Paris, France
- Location: France
- Official language: French
- President: Serge Toubiana
- Website: en.unifrance.org

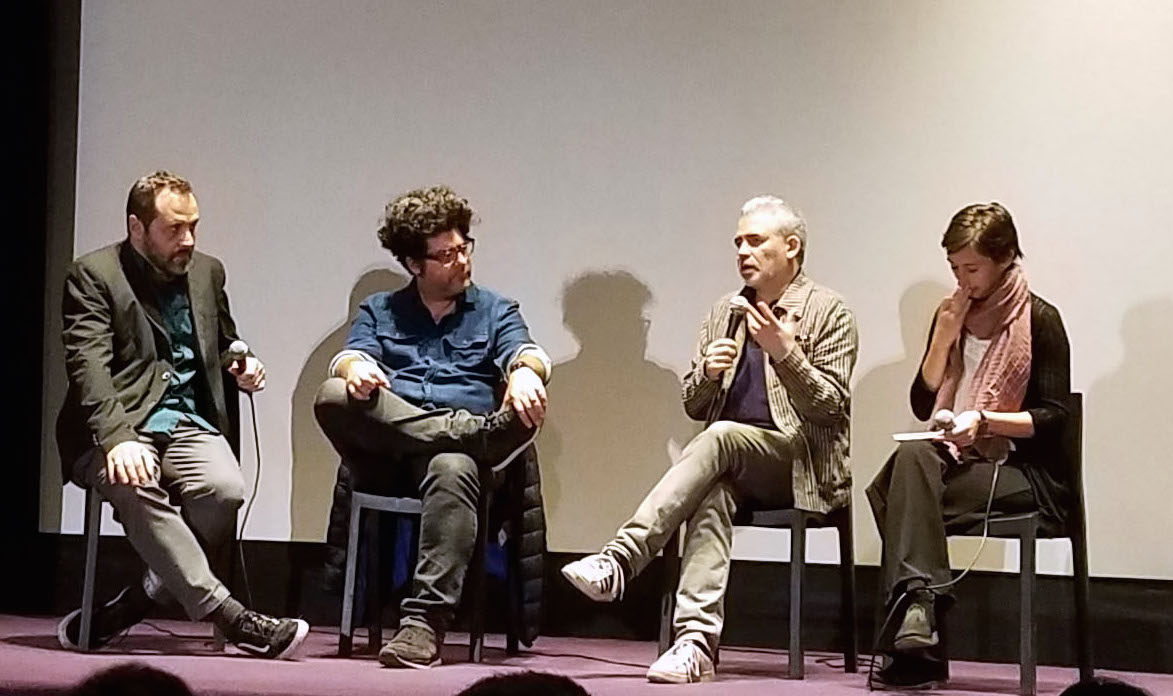
French filmmaker Stéphane Brizé (second from the right) in Buenos Aires in 2019, at an event organized with the support of UniFrance.

Unifrance is an organization for promoting French films in France and abroad. It is managed by the Centre national du cinéma et de l'image animée. It has several hundred members who include filmmakers, directors, screenwriters and agents.

Founded in 1949, it participates in around 50 film festivals per year and was one of the ten founding members of European Film Promotion.

== TV France International ==
In 2021, members of TV France International (created in 1994) voted for the absorption of TV France International by UniFrance.
