= OuiDo! Productions =

Entertainment production company

- Formerly: Timoon Animation (2003–2012); Genao Productions (2012–2013); Technicolor Animation Productions (2015–2022)
- Type: Private
- Industry: Film production Television production
- Founded: 28 May 2003; 23 years ago
- Founders: Philippe Mounier; Bridget Gauthier-Darcet
- Fate: Merged into Mikros Animation
- Headquarters: 8/10 rue du Renard – 75004, Paris, France
- Key people: Boris Hertzog (CEO & President); Sandrine Nguyen (CEO & Executive Producer)
- Services: Animation; Live-action
- Parent: PMMP (2003–2007); Lagardère Group (2007–2013); Technicolor SA (2015–2022); Technicolor Creative Studios (2022)
- Website: Official website at the Wayback Machine (archived 2016-12-04)

OuiDo! Productions (formerly known as Timoon Animation, Genao Productions and Technicolor Animation Productions) is a French-based entertainment production company that served as a production arm of the French visual effects and animation company Technicolor Creative Studios (now Technicolor Group). The company was founded on May 28, 2003, as Timoon Animation by Philippe Mounier (the founder of PMMP) and Bridget Gauthier-Darcet (of Largardère Images), and they were responsible for co-producing animated shows and reboots for the Alvin and the Chipmunks and Sonic the Hedgehog franchises.

== History ==
Technicolor Animation Productions was first founded in Paris, France on May 28, 2003, in which it was originally known as Timoon Animation when the then vice-president of Lagardère Images, Brigett Gautheir-Darcet and founder of another animation studio in France PMMP, Philippe Mounier teamed up to create this company in order to boost Lagardère Images and produced its first animated series The Odd Family which they co-produced with SAMG Animation (now SAMG Entertainment).

In 2007, Sandrine Nguyen and Boris Hertzog launched their audiovisuel production company named OuiDo! Entertainment but on October 3, 2008, Sandrine Nguyen and Boris Hertzog the directors of OuiDo! Entertainment which they founded in 2007 joined Timoon Animation under Christophe Thoral with the two being both named Managing Producer and Executive Producer including their projects which were being developed under Timoon Animation as OuiDo! Entertainment's division was merged into Timoon Animation.

On March 5, 2012, after Lagardére Entertainment was founded in 2008 taking Timoon Animation with it, it was announced that the company had been rebranded to Genao Productions in order to expand its focus towards fiction and unscripted entertainment programs for young people.

In October of that same year Genao Productions announced that they had partnered with American-based company and owner of the legendary Alvin and the Chipmunks band Bagdasarian Productions to produce a new CGI animated series revival named ALVINNN!!! and the Chipmunks which was originally titled The Chipmunks and Chipettes with PGS Entertainment acquiring the global distribution rights to the show on August 21, 2013, but excluding US and France.

On October 2, 2013, the company joined forces with Japanese-based video game company Sega through its American division Sega of America to bring the Sonic the Hedgehog franchise back into television with its CGI animated series Sonic Boom which premiered on Cartoon Network in the US, Canal J and Gulli in France on November 8, 2014, with Lagardère Entertainment Rights (now LS Distribution) handling distribution. Also in October, 7 of the same year when Largadère Entertainment had announced that they were ceasing animation production in order to focus on scripted and unscripted programming, they sold its animation subsidiary Genao Productions to its managers Sandrine Nguyen and Boris Hertzog which founded OuiDo! Entertainment in 2007 prior to join the company in 2008. Genao was turned into an independent animation producer by them and the two renamed the company to and created OuiDo! Productions after they with Lagardére Entertainment Rights retaining Genao's back catalogue. Sandrine Nguyen and Boris Hertzog were both later named CEOs of the newly renamed company with Hertzog became the present of the independent animation studio.

On February 25, 2015, American/French technology and creative company Technicolor SA (now known as Vantiva) announced that they had acquired OuiDo! Productions and they renamed the studio as Technicolor Animation Productions with Sandrine Nguyen and Boris Hertzog remained CEOs and continued to work for the renamed company. After the Technicolor SA purchase, OuiDo! works were retroactively credited with the new company name and logo, replacing the OuiDo! logo.

It partnered up with American-based Bagdasarian Productions to produce the 2015 series Alvinnn!!! and the Chipmunks with PGS Entertainment distributing. the show started airing in March 2015 and April 2015 respectively in the United States and United Kingdom on Nickelodeon.

In 2017, Technicolor Animation Productions announced Team DroniX, a creation co-produced with France TV and Gloob in Brazil.

In 2022, due to the spin-off of Technicolor Creative Studios, it, along with Technicolor Animation, were merged into Mikros Animation, this caused some shows such as Alvinnn!!! and the Chipmunks to end production.

In March 2025, Boris Hertzog acquired certain assets of Mikros Animation due to the receivership of its parent company, officially relaunching the studio back under its former name OuiDo! Productions with the company planning to merge with Hertzog's distribution arm Moon Keys International Content.

== Filmography ==
Title	Years	Network	Notes
The Odd Family	2005	TF1	co-production with PMMP and SAMG Animation
Forest Friends	2006–07	TF1	co-production with PMMP
My Giant Friend	2009–10	France 3 IMBC (South Korea)	co-production with SAMG Animation and PMMP
Monk Little Dog	2009–2010	Canal+	co-production with Kim's Licensing, SAMG Animation and Millimages
Bugged	2009	Canal+	co-production with Canal+ and Art'mell
Fish 'n' Chips	2011–12	Gulli	co-production with SAMG Animation, Hawaii Animation Studio, Cyber Group Studios and Jeunesse TV
Mini-Wolf	2012	France 5/TiJi	
Scary Larry	2012	Canal+	co-production with 1492 Television and Cartoon Pictures
Xiaolin Chronicles	2013–15	Gulli/Canal J	co-production with ActionFliks Media Corporation Based on Xiaolin Showdown, by Warner Bros. Animation
Sonic Boom	2014–17	Gulli/Canal J Cartoon Network/Boomerang	international co-production with Sega of America, Inc., Lagardère Thématiques and Jeunesse TV; Based on the Sonic the Hedgehog video game series
ALVINNN!!! and the Chipmunks	2015–23	M6; Nickelodeon	co-production with Bagdasarian Productions; Based on the Alvin and The Chipmunks franchise, loosely based on the movie franchise
Monchhichi Tribe	2017–20	TF1	
Team Dronix	2019	France 4	international co-production with France Télévisions and Gloob (owned by Canais Globo, in turn owned by Grupo Globo)
Gus: The Itsy Bitsy Knight	2021–present	TF1	

Technicolor India/OuiDo! Productions has animated the following shows:

- Teenage Mutant Ninja Turtles (animation services, seasons 1–2)
- Mickey Mouse Mixed-Up Adventures (animation services)
- Elena of Avalor (animation services, seasons 2–3)
- Rugrats (animation services)
- Mira, Royal Detective
- The Psammy Show
- Spirit Riding Free (animation services)
- Fast & Furious Spy Racers (animation services)
- The Chicken Squad (animation services)
- Mickey Mouse Funhouse (animation services)
- The Croods: Family Tree (animation services)
- Kamp Koral: SpongeBob's Under Years (animation services)
- Gabby's Dollhouse (animation services)
- The Boss Baby: Back in the Crib (animation services)
- Kung Fu Panda: The Dragon Knight (animation services)
- DreamWorks Dragons: The Nine Realms (animation services)
- Mickey Mouse Clubhouse+ (animation services, episode 15 onwards)

== See also ==
- Bagdasarian Productions
- PGS Entertainment
- Klasky Csupo
- United Plankton Pictures
- Disney Television Animation
- DreamWorks Animation Television
