= TV France International =

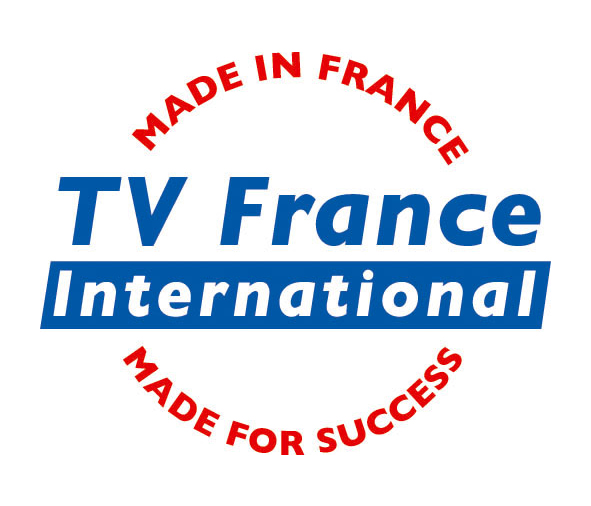
TV France International logo

TV France International was the organization in charge of promoting French audiovisual programming around the world until June 2021.

It brought together around 160 French exporters-producers, distributors and the distribution arm of broadcasters - who represented 90% of all international sales.

TV France International was supported by the CNC (Centre national du cinéma), the French Ministry of Europe and Foreign Affairs, and the Procirep.

On June 23, 2021, the members of TV France International voted 85 votes in favor and 1 abstention on the merger agreement unanimously approved on April 23 by its board of directors. By this vote, they record the dissolution and the absorption of TV France International, created in 1994, by UniFrance, in charge of the promotion of French cinema internationally.

== Promotional activities ==
TV France International connects buyers and French exporters through:

- Le Rendez-Vous, an opportunity for acquisition executives to screen more than 1,300 recent French programs and to meet with French distributors (The 19th Rendez-Vous was held in Biarritz, September 8–12, 2013)

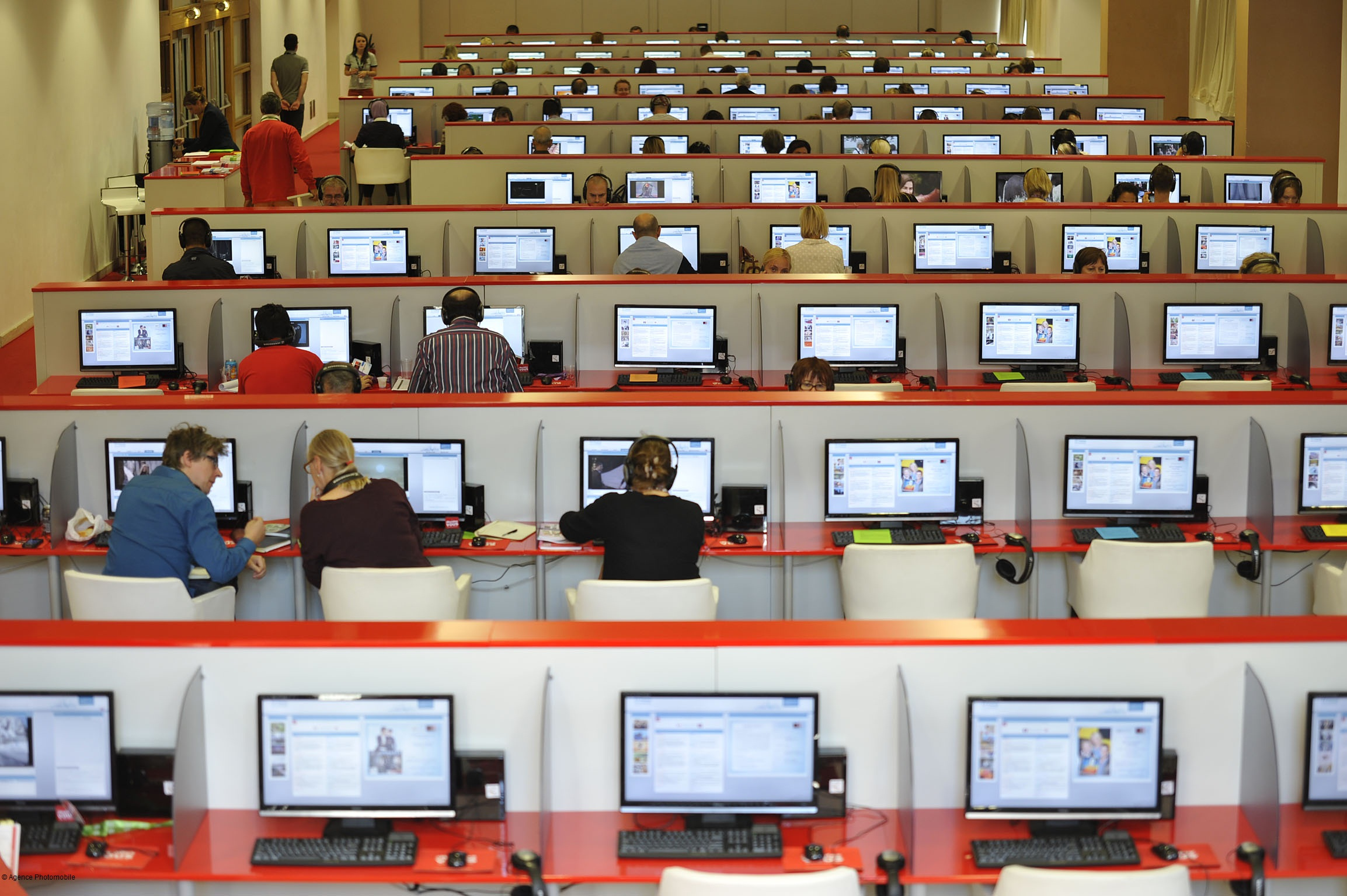
Le Rendez-Vous 2013

- umbrella booths and delegations at most major international television program markets
- focused promotional showcase events in various territories

A presentation of all the French TV catalogues under one roof at www.tvfrance-intl.com:

- more than 22,000 programs - drama (TV and feature films), animation, documentaries, game shows, performing arts – are presented in detail by all French exporters
- a detailed programs search and personal alerts on newly listed programs
- a VOD service dedicated to international buyers offering more than 6,000 full-length programs for online screening

The Export Award: It is given every year to the top selling programs. It highlights the economic and cultural impact of television program exports and pays tribute to the dynamism of French distributors.

Each year, the Export Award ceremony takes place in partnership with Procirep’ French Television Producer Awards.

The 2019 Export Award winners were:

- animation: Grizzy & the Lemmings - Season 1 (distributed by Hari International)
- documentary: The Origami Code (distributed by Lucky You)
- and fiction: Call My Agent! - Season 2 (distributed by France tv distribution)

Specific tools dedicated to member companies:

- Listing of programs in the online catalogue.
- An international database listing about 15,000 contacts from 4,000 companies seeking to acquire content.
- Information on the international market: market reports, studies and surveys, model contracts, ratings survey of French programs aired in key territories, etc.
