= Australia women's national soccer team results (unofficial matches) =

This is a list of the Australia women's national soccer team results that, for various reasons, are not accorded the status of official International A Matches.

== 1970s ==
=== 1978 ===
14 October	Australia	1–0	Landhaus Wien	Taipei, Taiwan
	Brentnall (?)	Report		Attendance:

15 October	Australia	1–1	Dallas Sting	Taipei, Taiwan
	Loveles (?)	Report	(?)

16 October	Australia	0–1	Hackås IF	Taipei, Taiwan
		Report	(?)

19 October	Australia	0–0	Denmark	Taipei, Taiwan
		Report

20 October	Australia	5–0	Thailand	Taipei, Taiwan
	Pettit (?); Loveless (?)	Report

== 1980s ==
=== 1981 ===
1 October	Canterbury	0–2	Australia	Christchurch, New Zealand
		Report	Porter (?); Wright (?)	Attendance:

2 October	Otago	0–6	Australia	Dunedin, New Zealand
		Report	Wass (?); Dolan (?); Porter (?); Singleton (?)

3 October	Waikato	0–1	Australia	Hamilton, New Zealand
		Report	Brentnall (?)

=== 1983 ===
9 March	He Pua Pani	1–0	Australia	Honolulu, United States
	(?)	Report		Attendance:

10 March	Royal Hawaii	0–3	Australia	Honolulu, United States
		Report	Monteath (?); Priestley (?)

11 March	Leahi	0–0	Australia	Honolulu, United States
		Report

14 March	Royal Hawaiian Select	0–1	Australia	Honolulu, United States
		Report	Porter (?)

15 March	Royal Hawaiian Select	0–1	Australia	Honolulu, United States
		Report	(?)

16 March	Royal Hawaiian Select	2–3	Australia	Honolulu, United States
	(?)	Report	Millman (?); Priestley (?); Iserief (?)

=== 1984 ===
14 October	Tianjin	1–3	Australia	Xi'an, China
	(?)	Report	Iserief (?); Lembryk (?)	Attendance:

16 October	Dallas Sting	0–1	Australia	Xi'an, China
		Report	Dolan (?)

18 October	Shaanxi	2–3	Australia	Xi'an, China
	(?)	Report	Wardell (?); Iserief (?); Watts (?)

22 October	Dallas Sting	1–0	Australia	Xi'an, China
		Report	(?)

9 December	California-El Camino	1–2	Australia	Taipei, Taiwan
	(?)	Report	Wardell (?); Petrov (?)

10 December	Bergisch Gladbach	0–0	Australia	Taipai, Taiwan
		Report

15 December	Bul Oslo	0–1	Australia	Taipei, Taiwan
		Report	Iserief (?)

16 December	Liang-Yu	1–0	Australia	Taipei, Taiwan
		Report	(?)

=== 1986 ===
2 April 1986 OFC Women's Championship	New Zealand B	1–2	Australia	Christchurch, New Zealand
	Bradley (?)	Report	Monteath 20' (pen.); Loveless 65'	Attendance:

=== 1987 ===
11 December	Liang-Yu	1–0	Australia	Taipei, Taiwan
	(?)	Report		Attendance:

20 December	Bergisch Gladbach	2–0	Australia	Taipei, Taiwan
	(?)	Report

=== 1989 ===
27 March 1989 OFC Women's Championship	Australia	0–0	Australia B	Brisbane, Australia
		Report		Stadium: Perry Park; Attendance:
Note: Match was played in 70 minutes duration.

13 December	Prima Kunoichi	0–2	Australia	Kanagawa, Japan
		Report	Dodd (?); Murray (?)

15 December	Yomiuri	0–1	Australia	Kanagawa, Japan
		Report	Oakley (?)

== 1990s ==
=== 1991 ===
Australia	1–1	Malmö	Sydney, Australia

Australia	0–2	Malmö	Sydney, Australia

Australia	1–2	Malmö	Canberra, Australia

=== 1994 ===
18 April 1994 1994 Gold Coast Invitional Tournament	Australia	0–0	Australia B	Gold Coast, Australia
		Report

18 April 1994 1994 Gold Coast Invitional Tournament	Australia	1–2	Australia B	Gold Coast, Australia
		Report

Munich University	0–7	Australia	Munich, Germany

IAC Amazonen	0–9	Australia	Munich, Germany

Wacker München	1–3	Australia	Munich, Germany

Bayern Munich	0–2	Australia	Munich, Germany

Fortuna Elite	0–4	Australia	Copenhagen, Denmark

Fortuna Elite	0–3	Australia	Copenhagen, Denmark

Samara	2–0	Australia	Samara, Russia

Lada Toliati	0–2	Australia	Samara, Russia

=== 1995 ===
Sacramento	0–2	Australia	Phoenix, United States

Paulo Vista	0–6	Australia	Uberlândia, Brazil

Gideonsberg	2–4	Australia	Västerås, Sweden

=== 1997 ===
Renova	2–2	Australia	Budapest, Hungary

== 2000s ==
=== 2001 ===
Beleza	4–0	Australia	Tokyo, Japan

=== 2004 ===
Australia	3–2	Florida State University	Canberra, Australia
			Attendance:

Australia	1–1	Florida State University	Gold Coast, Australia

Australia	4–1	Florida State University	Gold Coast, Australia

30 June	China	0–2	Australia	Beijing, China
		Report	Walsh 45', 60'

14 July	Indiana	0–1	Australia	Goshen, United States
		Report

18 July	United States	0–2	Australia	Milwaukee, United States
		Report

Mexico	0–1	Australia	Athens, Greece

=== 2005 ===
Australia	2–3	Shanghai SVA	Canberra, Australia

Australia	2–1	Shanghai SVA	Canberra, Australia

== 2010s ==
=== 2013 ===
Den Haag	1–0	Australia	Delft, Netherlands
	Report

== 2020s ==
=== 2024 ===
14 July	Australia	1–2	Canada	Marbella, Spain
21:00 UTC+2	Freier 23'	Report	Prince 41'; Viens 85'
