= 2010 OFC Women's Championship squads =

The 2010 OFC Women's Championship was an international football tournament held in New Zealand from 29 September to 8 October 2010.

== Group A ==
=== Cook Islands ===
Head coach: Jimmy Katoa

No.	Pos.	Player	Date of birth (age)	Club
1	GK	Marjorie Toru	29 June 1994 (aged 16)	
2		Jennifer Akavi	20 March 1994 (aged 16)	
3		Aketuke Unuka	1 March 1996 (aged 14)	
4		Tekura Tutai		
5		Tekura Kaukura		
6		Marissa Iroa	17 November 1993 (aged 16)	
7		Teariivahine-Iteuaterai Henry	30 August 1991 (aged 19)	
8		Liz Harmon	9 January 1992 (aged 18)	
9		Dayna Napa		
10		Regina Mustonen	19 January 1992 (aged 18)	
11		Danielle Trego		
12		Natasha Dean	23 February 1994 (aged 16)	
13		Leiana Temata	9 January 1995 (aged 15)	
14		Tepaeru Toka	31 March 1995 (aged 15)	
15		Louisa Manico		
16		Upokotea Manulea	15 July 1989 (aged 21)	
17		Ani-Tia Piri		
18		Angela Wallbank		
19		Kim Tare		
20	GK	Louisa Browne		

=== New Zealand ===
Head coach: John Herdman

No.	Pos.	Player	Date of birth (age)	Club
1	GK	Jenny Bindon	25 February 1973 (aged 37)	
2		Ria Percival	7 December 1989 (aged 20)	
3		Anna Green	20 August 1990 (aged 20)	
4		Katie Hoyle	1 February 1988 (aged 22)	
5		Abby Erceg	20 November 1989 (aged 20)	
6		Rebecca Smith	17 June 1981 (aged 29)	
7		Ali Riley	30 October 1987 (aged 22)	
8		Hayley Moorwood	13 February 1984 (aged 26)	
9		Amber Hearn	28 November 1984 (aged 25)	
10		Elizabeth Milne	11 December 1990 (aged 19)	
11		Kirsty Yallop	4 November 1986 (aged 23)	
12		Maia Jackman	25 May 1975 (aged 35)	
13		Bridgette Armstrong	9 November 1992 (aged 17)	
14		Rosie White	6 June 1993 (aged 17)	
15		Sarah Gregorius	6 August 1987 (aged 23)	
16		Emma Kete	1 September 1987 (aged 23)	
17		Hannah Wilkinson	28 May 1992 (aged 18)	
18		Kristy Hill	1 July 1979 (aged 31)	
20	GK	Aroon Clansey	12 February 1986 (aged 24)	

=== Tahiti ===
Head coach: Ralph Apuarii

No.	Pos.	Player	Date of birth (age)	Club
1	GK	Poroni Turana		
2		Mariko Izal	1 November 1991 (aged 18)	
3		Maruina Tom Sing Vein		
4		Nicole Bouges		
5		Angela Taiarui		
6		Ninauea Hioe	20 December 1993 (aged 16)	
7		Tihani Tokoragi	21 April 1994 (aged 16)	
8		Vaitiare Pito		
9		Linda Rua	31 January 1975 (aged 35)	
10		Mohea Hauata		
11		Heimiri Alvarez	3 September 1988 (aged 22)	
12		Tiare White		
13		Sandrine Teauna		
14		Tiere Apo		
15		Kahana Maruae		
16	GK	Benita Manaia		
17		Vaiata Mai		
18		Clara Marahiti		
19		Mataireva Tapotofarerani		
20		Tania Keuvahana		

=== Vanuatu ===
Head coach: Richard Iwai

No.	Pos.	Player	Date of birth (age)	Club
1	GK	Rose Yolou	12 March 1974 (aged 36)	
2		Leisale Solomon		
3		Sylvia Vatoko		
4		Sergine Poida		
5		Sileye Saina		
6		Jeanine Alatoa		
7		Marseline Bakokoto		
8		Stephanie Tougen		
9		Joella Avock		
10		Elodie Samuel		
11		Serah Thompson		
12		Thelma Kalpukai		
13		Phina Angelo		
14		Janice Alatoa	30 October 1988 (aged 21)	
15		Evensta Aru		
16		Melanie Mansale		
17	GK	Haia Taiwia		

== Group B ==
=== Fiji ===
Head coach: Ramesh Sharma

No.	Pos.	Player	Date of birth (age)	Club
1	GK	Lice Waqaliti		
2		Asena Reba Ratu		
3		Raijieli Lewasoqevula		
4		Kini Vanua		
5		Alisi Uluibatiki		
6		Jijilia Dugucanavanua	30 June 1988 (aged 22)	
7		Vini Simmons		
8		Priya Singh		
9		Viniana Riwai	6 June 1991 (aged 19)	
10		Bush Vatulili		
11		Yasreen Begum		
12		Stella Naivalulevu		
13		Kuru Ligavola		
14		Jipa Rasaku		
15		Lewa Moce	21 December 1988 (aged 21)	
16		Meki Moceituba		
17		Bela Ratubalavu	25 October 1993 (aged 16)	
18	GK	Meldo Yabakidrau		

=== Papua New Guinea ===
Head coach: Francis Moyap

No.	Pos.	Player	Date of birth (age)	Club
1	GK	Linda Bunaga	13 February 1987 (aged 23)	
2		Esther Kurabi		
3		Miriam Lanta	22 December 1972 (aged 37)	
4		Kathrina Salaiau	29 September 1976 (aged 34)	
5		Dorcas Sesevo	22 March 1987 (aged 23)	
6		Jeni Ulengit		
7		Edna Thomas		
8		Linah Honeakii		
9		Dasi Winas	3 November 1986 (aged 23)	
10		Sandra Birum	6 June 1992 (aged 18)	
11		Zeena Limbai	4 July 1990 (aged 20)	
12		Monics Yawas		
13		Sammy Peninsa		
14		Carol Moeder		
15		Deslyn Siniu	2 January 1981 (aged 29)	
16		Lydics Banabas		
17		Rumona Morris	5 June 1993 (aged 17)	
18	GK	Fidelma Watpore	9 February 1988 (aged 22)	

=== Solomon Islands ===
Head coach: Timothy Inifiri

No.	Pos.	Player	Date of birth (age)	Club
1	GK	Betty Sade		
2		Calrose Gwali		
3		Belinda Susana		
4		Bere Masae		
5		Odana Galo		
6		Gael Donga		
7		Rayma Zoze		
8		Everlyn Asibara		
9		Betty Maenu'u		
10		Mary Maefiti	20 April 1994 (aged 16)	
11		Veronica Tolivaka	11 October 1993 (aged 16)	
12		Ella Misibini		
13		Alice Olomane		
14		Mesalyn Saepio	25 November 1991 (aged 18)	
15		Pauline Erewai		
16		Ileen Pegi	18 July 1992 (aged 18)	
17		Prudence Fula		
18		Sally Saeni		
19		Annie Bwakolo		
20	GK	Annie Geli		

=== Tonga ===
Head coach: Kilifi Uele

No.	Pos.	Player	Date of birth (age)	Club
1	GK	Lupe Likiliki		
2		Sofia Filo	3 July 1985 (aged 25)	
3		Emelita Moala		
4		Anne Marie Taukapo		
5		Kiana Mu'amoholeva		
6		Laite Si'i Manu		
7		Fololeni Siale	8 June 1991 (aged 19)	
9		Piuingi Feke		
10		Heilala Loto'aniu	28 March 1991 (aged 19)	
11		Keti Fatai		
12		Neomai Tupou		
13		Lita Misinale		
14		Eseta Vi	24 December 1988 (aged 21)	
15		Pauline Tonga	8 March 1993 (aged 17)	
16		Vasi Feke	31 October 1991 (aged 18)	
17		Buccilea Ongolea		
18		Koni Vungamoeahi		
19		Tea Tu'ivailala		
20		Olive Mateialona		
21	GK	Tangimausia Ma'afu		
