= 1991 OFC Women's Championship =

Tournament details
- Host country: Australia
- Dates: 19–25 May
- Teams: 3 (from 1 confederation)
- Venue: 1 (in 1 host city)

Final positions
- Champions: New Zealand (2nd title)
- Runners-up: Australia
- Third place: Papua New Guinea

Tournament statistics
- Matches played: 6
- Goals scored: 49 (8.17 per match)
- Top scorer: (New Zealand) Wendy Sharpe (8 goals)

The 1991 OFC Women's Championship was the fourth OFC Women's Championship of women's association football (also known as the OFC Women's Nations Cup). It took place in Sydney, Australia from 19 to 25 May 1991. Only three teams participated in the tournament, and a total of six matches were played. This edition served as the OFC's qualifying tournament for the inaugural FIFA Women's World Cup.

New Zealand won the tournament for the second time after finishing first in the round robin (by goal difference) and qualified to the World Cup.

== Background ==
After the 1989 edition of the tournament, the Oceania Women's Football Confederation (OWFC) decided to increase the length of matches from 70 to 80 minutes. The next tournament was provisionally awarded to Papua New Guinea and scheduled for 1992. In February 1990 FIFA had announced the Women's World Cup for November 1991 but still not confirmed the arrangements for qualification in the Oceania region. At an OWFC meeting in September 1990, the Australian delegation persuaded Papua New Guinea of "its financial interests" in allowing the Oceania tournament to be played in Australia in May 1991.

== Review ==
Although Australia enjoyed home advantage with all six games played at Marconi Stadium, New Zealand were regarded as favourites since they had outperformed Australia at the previous edition of the tournament two years earlier. They also regarded their American-born goalkeeper Leslie King as the best in the world.

Australia's coach Steve Darby named key midfielder Julie Murray in the squad despite her suffering from the effects of glandular fever. While New Zealand arrived without injured duo Amanda Crawford and Vivienne Robertson.

Owing to financial constraints, Darby was only able to bring his squad together four days before the competition started. A last-minute "financial gift" of A$5,000 from the Australian Soccer Federation (ASF) saved the players from having to pay A$350 each to cover costs, leading Darby to report a much happier camp: "It means morale has immediately been lifted, especially if the players know they don't have to go into debt to represent their country."

New Zealand seized the initiative when they thrashed Papua New Guinea 16–0 in the tournament's opening fixture on Sunday 19 May 1991, then beat Australia 1–0 the following day. Wendy Sharpe headed the winning goal on 66 minutes from Deborah Pullen's cross. On Tuesday 21 May Australia built an 8–0 half-time lead against Papua New Guinea, but tired in the second half and had to settle for a final score of 12–0.

Following a rest day on Wednesday 22 May, New Zealand beat Papua New Guinea 11–0 on Thursday. On Friday 24 May Australia came back into contention by beating New Zealand 1–0. This time Moya Dodd headed the only goal, after eight minutes. The result meant Australia needed to beat Papua New Guinea by 16 goals in the final fixture, to edge above New Zealand on goal difference.

Despite six goals from Carol Vinson, Australia could only win 8–0. They finished in second place to New Zealand, who took the single Oceania qualifying place for the 1991 FIFA Women's World Cup. After the match Steve Darby resigned and acknowledged the disappointment of his players: "They know that two years of their life has been thrown away. There is nothing I can say to make them feel any better about it."

Julie Murray contemplated a return to semi-professional club soccer in Europe with Fortuna Hjørring. She had rejected an offer to remain with Fortuna in 1991, to ensure her availability for Australia's World Cup qualifying campaign. Murray was dejected and felt that lack of preparation let the Australian team down: "One of the things that counted against us in Sydney was the lack of time we were able to spend together as a team. We were fit but we lacked match practice."

== Teams ==
The following three teams participated in the tournament:

- Australia
- New Zealand
- Papua New Guinea

== Standings ==
Pos	Team	Pld	W	D	L	GF	GA	GD	Pts	Qualification
1	New Zealand (C)	4	3	0	1	28	1	+27	6	Qualification for 1991 FIFA Women's World Cup
2	Australia (H)	4	3	0	1	21	1	+20	6	
3	Papua New Guinea	4	0	0	4	0	47	−47	0	

Source: RSSSF
(C) Champions; (H) Hosts

== Matches ==
19 May 1991

New Zealand	16–0	Papua New Guinea
van de Elzen ?', ?', ?', ?', ?'; Baker ?'; Sharpe ?', ?', ?'; Campbell ?'; Henderson ?', ?'; Cox ?'; Jacobson ?', ?'; Pullen ?'

Marconi Stadium, Sydney

20 May 1991

New Zealand	1–0	Australia
Sharpe 66'	Report

Marconi Stadium, Sydney

21 May 1991

Papua New Guinea	0–12	Australia
	Report	Hughes ?', ?', ?', ?'; Iannotta ?', ?'; Wass ?', ?'; Gegenhuber ?'; Tann ?'; Bartlett ?' ? ?'

Marconi Stadium, Sydney

23 May 1991

Papua New Guinea	0–11	New Zealand
		Sharpe ?', ?', ?', ?'; Campbell ?'; Chaney ?'; Fisher ?'; Pullen ?'; Henderson ?'; Nye ?'; Warring ?'

Marconi Stadium, Sydney

24 May 1991

Australia	1–0	New Zealand
Dodd 8'

Marconi Stadium, Sydney
Referee: Bill Monteverde (Australia)

25 May 1991

Papua New Guinea	0–8	Australia
		Vinson ?', ?', ?', ?', ?', ?'; Hughes ?', ?'

Marconi Stadium, Sydney

== Awards ==
1991 OFC Women's Championship winners

New Zealand
Second title

== Statistics ==
=== Goalscorers ===
8 goals

- (New Zealand) Wendy Sharpe

6 goals

- (Australia) Sunni Hughes
- (Australia) Carol Vinson

5 goals

- (New Zealand) Monique van de Elzen

3 goals

- (New Zealand) Wendi Henderson

2 goals

- (New Zealand) Julia Campbell
- (Australia) Angela Iannotta
- (New Zealand) Maureen Jacobson
- (New Zealand) Deborah Pullen
- (Australia) Sharon Wass

1 goal

- (New Zealand) Donna Baker
- (Australia) Traci Bartlett
- (New Zealand) Cinnamon Chaney
- (New Zealand) Michele Cox
- (Australia) Moya Dodd
- (New Zealand) Jo Fisher
- (Australia) Sonia Gegenhuber
- (New Zealand) Kim Nye
- (Australia) Anissa Tann
- (New Zealand) Lynne Warring

Unknown goalscorers

- Australia: 1 additional goal
