= OFC Women's Nations Cup records and statistics =

The OFC Women's Nations Cup (previously known as the OFC Women's Championship) is a women's association football tournament for national teams who belong to the Oceania Football Confederation (OFC). It was held every three years from 1983 to 1989. Currently, the tournament is held at irregular intervals.

This is a list of records and statistics of the tournament.

== General statistics by tournament ==
Year	Host	Champion (titles)	Winning coach	Top scorer(s) (goals)
1983	New Caledonia	New Zealand (1)	(New Zealand) Albie Evans	(New Zealand) Wendy Sharpe (7)
1986	New Zealand	Chinese Taipei (1)	(Taiwan) Chong Tsu-pin	(Chinese Taipei) Liu Yu-chu (3)
1989	Australia	Chinese Taipei (2)	(Taiwan) Chong Tsu-pin	(Chinese Taipei) Huang Yu-chuan (9)
1991	Australia	New Zealand (2)	(New Zealand) Dave Boardman	(Australia) Sunni Hughes (10)
1994	Papua New Guinea	Australia (1)	(Scotland) Tom Sermanni	(Australia) Cheryl Salisbury (New Zealand) Wendy Sharpe (3)
1998	New Zealand	Australia (2)	(Australia) Greg Brown	(New Zealand) Pernille Andersen (15)
2003	Australia	Australia (3)	(Australia) Adrian Santrac	(New Zealand) Maia Jackman (10)
2007	Papua New Guinea	New Zealand (3)	(England) John Herdman	(New Zealand) Nicky Smith (New Zealand) Kirsty Yallop (4)
2010	New Zealand	New Zealand (4)	(England) John Herdman	(New Zealand) Amber Hearn (12)
2014	Papua New Guinea	New Zealand (5)	(England) Tony Readings	(New Zealand) Amber Hearn (7)
2018	New Caledonia	New Zealand (6)	(Scotland) Tom Sermanni	(New Zealand) Sarah Gregorius (Papua New Guinea) Meagen Gunemba (8)
2022	Fiji	Papua New Guinea (1)	(England) Nicola Demaine	(Papua New Guinea) Meagen Gunemba (Papua New Guinea) Ramona Padio (Samoa) Jayda Stewart (5)
2025	Fiji	Solomon Islands (1)	(Solomon Islands) Moses Toata	(Papua New Guinea) Marie Kaipu (Vanuatu) Leimata Simon (5)

== Most tournaments hosted ==
Hosts	Nation	Year(s)
3 times	Australia	1989, 1991, 2003
3 times	New Zealand	1986, 1998, 2010
3 times	Papua New Guinea	1994, 2007, 2014
2 times	Fiji	2022, 2025
2 times	New Caledonia	1983, 2018

== Participating nations ==
Legend

- 1st – Champions
- 2nd – Runners-up
- 3rd – Third place
- 4th – Fourth place
- GS – Group stage
- Q – Qualified
- • – Did not qualify
- × – Withdrew
- No longer OFC member
- — Hosts

Team	(New Caledonia) 1983	(New Zealand) 1986	(Australia) 1989	(Australia) 1991	(Papua New Guinea) 1994	(New Zealand) 1998	(Australia) 2003	(Papua New Guinea) 2007	(New Zealand) 2010	(Papua New Guinea) 2014	(New Caledonia) 2018	(Fiji) 2022	(Fiji) 2025	Total
New Zealand	1st	3rd	2nd	1st	2nd	2nd	2nd	1st	1st	1st	1st	×	—	11
Papua New Guinea	—	×	5th	3rd	3rd	3rd	3rd	2nd	2nd	2nd	3rd	1st	2nd	11
Australia (Note: Former OFC member, but now a member of the Asian Football Confederation.)	2nd	2nd	3rd (Note: The third place play-off scheduled to take place between Australia and Australia B was cancelled due to waterlogged pitch, so their group standings are used.)	2nd	1st	1st	1st							7
Cook Islands	—	—	—	—	—	—	5th	×	3rd	3rd	GS	QF	8th	6
Fiji	4th	—	—	—	—	4th	×	×	GS	—	2nd	2nd	4th	6
Tonga	—	—	—	—	—	—	×	3rd	GS	4th	GS	QF	7th	6
Samoa	—	—	—	—	—	GS	4th	×	—	—	GS	4th	3rd	5
Solomon Islands	—	—	—	—	—	—	—	4th	4th	—	•	3rd	1st	4
Tahiti	—	—	—	—	—	—	×	×	GS	—	GS	QF	6th	4
New Caledonia	3rd (Note: New Caledonia participated and hosted the tournament in 1983, but were not a member of the OFC or FIFA until 2004.)	—	—	—	—	—	—	×	—	—	4th	QF	—	3
Vanuatu	—	—	—	—	—	—	×	×	GS	—	•	GS	5th	3
Chinese Taipei	—	1st	1st											2
American Samoa	—	—	—	—	—	GS	×	—	—	—	•	×	—	1
Australia B (Note: Secondary national team.)	—	—	4th	—	—	—	—							1
New Zealand B	—	4th	—	—	—	—	—	—	—	—	—	—	—	1

== Teams reaching the top four ==
Team	Champions	Runners-up	Third-place	Fourth-place
New Zealand	6 (1983, 1991, 2007, 2010, 2014, 2018)	4 (1989, 1994, 1998, 2003)	1 (1986)	–
Australia (Note: Former OFC member, but now a member of the Asian Football Confederation.)	3 (1994, 1998, 2003)	3 (1983, 1986, 1991)	1 (1989)	–
Chinese Taipei	2 (1986, 1989)	–	–	–
Papua New Guinea	1 (2022)	4 (2007, 2010, 2014, 2025)	5 (1991, 1994, 1998, 2003, 2018)	–
Solomon Islands	1 (2025)	–	1 (2022)	2 (2007, 2010)
Fiji	–	2 (2018, 2022)	–	3 (1983, 1998, 2025)
Cook Islands	–	–	2 (2010, 2014)	–
Samoa	–	–	1 (2025)	2 (2003, 2022)
New Caledonia	–	–	1 (1983)	1 (2018)
Tonga	–	–	1 (2007)	1 (2014)
Australia B	–	–	1 (1989)	–
New Zealand B	–	–	–	1 (1986)

== All-time table ==
Team has won the OFC Women's Nations Cup
Team withdrew

Pos	Team	Part	Pld	W	D	L	GF	GA	Dif	Pts
1	New Zealand	10	39	30	2	7	246	16	+230	92
2	Papua New Guinea	10	41	20	1	20	85	129	–44	61
3	Australia	7	28	19	2	7	159	19	+140	59
4	Chinese Taipei	2	9	8	0	1	23	5	+18	24
5	Fiji	5	20	7	2	11	38	97	–59	23
6	Samoa	4	14	4	2	8	16	83	–67	14
7	Cook Islands	5	13	3	2	8	9	64	–55	11
8	New Caledonia	3	11	3	1	7	16	43	−27	10
9	Tonga	5	15	2	4	9	8	67	–59	10
10	Tahiti	3	9	1	2	6	14	24	–10	5
11	Solomon Islands	2	8	1	2	5	6	26	–20	5
12	Australia B	1	4	1	1	2	2	6	–4	4
13	New Zealand B	1	4	0	1	3	1	5	−4	1
14	Vanuatu	2	5	0	1	4	2	24	−22	1
15	American Samoa	1	2	0	0	2	0	30	−30	0
16	India	0	0	0	0	0	0	0	0	0

== Debut of teams ==
Year	Debutants	Total
1983	Australia; Fiji; New Caledonia; New Zealand	4
1986	Chinese Taipei; New Zealand B	2
1989	Australia B ~~India~~; Papua New Guinea	2
1991	None	0
1994	None	0
1998	American Samoa; Samoa	2
2003	Cook Islands	1
2007	Solomon Islands; Tonga	2
2010	Tahiti; Vanuatu	2
2014	None	0
2018	None	0
2022	None	0
Total		15

== Results of host nations ==
Year	Host nation	Finish
1983	New Caledonia	Third Place
1986	New Zealand	Third Place
1989	Australia	Third Place
1991	Australia	Runners-up
1994	Papua New Guinea	Third Place
1998	New Zealand	Runners-up
2003	Australia	Champions
2007	Papua New Guinea	Runners-up
2010	New Zealand	Champions
2014	Papua New Guinea	Runners-up
2018	New Caledonia	Fourth place
2022	Fiji	Runners-up
2025	Fiji	Fourth place

== Results of defending champions ==
Year	Defending champions	Finish
1986	New Zealand	Third Place
1989	Chinese Taipei	Champions
1991	Chinese Taipei	Did not enter
1994	New Zealand	Runners-up
1998	Australia	Champions
2003	Australia	Champions
2007	Australia	Moved to AFC
2010	New Zealand	Champions
2014	New Zealand	Champions
2018	New Zealand	Champions
2022	New Zealand	Did not participate
2025	Papua New Guinea	Runners-up
