= 1989 in Australian soccer =

Soccer in Australia
- Season: 1989

Men's soccer
- NSL Premiership: Marconi Fairfield
- NSL Championship: Marconi Fairfield
- NSL Cup: Adelaide City

The 1989 season was the 20th season of national competitive soccer in Australia and 106th overall.

== National teams ==
=== Australia men's national soccer team ===
==== Results and fixtures ====
===== 1990 FIFA World Cup qualification =====
====== Second round ======
Pos	Team	Pld	W	D	L	GF	GA	GD	Pts	Qualification	Israel	Australia	New Zealand
1	Israel	4	1	3	0	5	4	+1	5	Advance to Inter-confederation play-offs	—	1–1	1–0
2	Australia	4	1	2	1	6	5	+1	4		1–1	—	4–1
3	New Zealand	4	1	1	2	5	7	−2	3		2–2	2–0	—

Source: RSSSF

12 March 1989	Australia	4–1	New Zealand	Sydney, Australia
	Crino 16'; Arnold 42', 56'; Yankos 78' (pen.)	Report	Dunford 70'	Stadium: Sydney Football Stadium; Attendance: 13,621; Referee: Shizuo Takada (Japan)

19 March 1989	Israel	1–1	Australia	Ramat Gan, Israel
	Ohana 66' (pen.)	Report	Yankos 72'	Stadium: National Stadium; Attendance: 45,000; Referee: Manfred Neumer (Germany)

2 April 1989	New Zealand	2–0	Australia	Auckland, New Zealand
	Dunford 19'; Wright 80'	Report		Stadium: Mount Smart Stadium; Attendance: 3,340; Referee: Bin Singah (Singapore)

16 April 1989	Australia	1–1	Israel	Sydney, Australia
	Trimboli 88'	Report	Ohana 40'	Stadium: Sydney Football Stadium; Attendance: 40,320; Referee: Carlo Longhi (Italy)

=== Australia women's national soccer team ===
==== Results and fixtures ====
===== 1989 OFC Women's Championship =====
====== First round ======
Pos	Team	Pld	W	D	L	GF	GA	GD	Pts	Qualification
1	New Zealand	4	4	0	0	10	0	+10	8	Advance to Final
2	Chinese Taipei	4	3	0	1	14	3	+11	6	Advance to Final
3	Australia (H)	4	1	1	2	7	6	+1	3	Advance to Third place play-off
4	Australia B	4	1	1	2	2	6	−4	3	Advance to Third place play-off
5	Papua New Guinea	4	0	0	4	1	19	−18	0	

Source: RSSSF
(H) Hosts

26 March 1989	Australia	0–2	New Zealand	Brisbane, Australia
		Report	Henderson HT+6'; Nye ?'	Stadium: Perry Park

28 March 1989	Australia	6–0	Papua New Guinea	Brisbane, Australia
	Riddington ?', ?', ?'; Vinson ?', ?'; Priestley ?'	Report		Stadium: Perry Park

31 March 1989	Australia	1–4	Chinese Taipei	Brisbane, Australia
	Riddington HT+24'	Report	Yu-Chuan HT+7', HT+13', HT+16'; Chun-Mei FT-1' (pen.)	Stadium: Perry Park

=== Australia men's national under-17 soccer team ===
==== Results and fixtures ====
===== 1989 FIFA U-16 World Championship =====
====== Group B ======
Pos	Team	Pld	W	D	L	GF	GA	GD	Pts	Qualification
1	East Germany	3	2	0	1	7	4	+3	4	Advance to knockout stage
2	Brazil	3	2	0	1	5	3	+2	4	Advance to knockout stage
3	United States	3	1	1	1	5	7	−2	3	
4	Australia	3	0	1	2	3	6	−3	1	

Source: RSSSF

10 June 1989	East Germany	1–0	Australia	Aberdeen, Scotland
14:00	Manke 51'	Report		Stadium: Pittodrie Stadium; Attendance: 3,300; Referee: Jim McCluskey (Scotland)

12 June 1989	Australia	1–3	Brazil	Aberdeen, Scotland
20:15	Corica 50'	Report	Carlos 11', 34'; Marcio 36'	Stadium: Pittodrie Stadium; Attendance: 2,300; Referee: David Brummitt (Canada)

14 June 1989	Australia	2–2	United States	Aberdeen, Scotland
20:15	Pangallo 71'; Suzor 73'	Report	Wood 6'; Haskins 70'	Stadium: Pittodrie Stadium; Attendance: 3,300; Referee: Kil Ki-Chul (South Korea)

===== 1989 OFC U-17 Championship =====
Pos	Team	Pld	W	D	L	GF	GA	GD	Pts	Qualification
1	Australia (H)	4	4	0	0	35	1	+34	8	Qualification for 1989 FIFA U-16 World Championship
2	New Zealand	4	3	0	1	18	5	+13	6	
3	Chinese Taipei	4	2	0	2	23	5	+18	4	
4	Fiji	4	1	0	3	9	23	−14	2	
5	Vanuatu	4	0	0	4	0	51	−51	0	

Source: RSSSF
(H) Hosts

21 January 1989	Australia	2–0	Chinese Taipei	Australia
		Report

24 January 1989	Australia	24–0	Vanuatu	Australia
		Report

25 January 1989	Australia	4–0	Fiji	Australia
		Report

29 January 1989	Australia	5–1	New Zealand	Australia
		Report

== Domestic soccer ==
=== National Soccer League ===
Pos	Team	Pld	W	D	L	GF	GA	GD	Pts	Qualification or relegation
1	Marconi Fairfield (C)	26	16	6	4	62	24	+38	38	Qualification for the Finals series
2	St George-Budapest	26	12	8	6	33	24	+9	32	Qualification for the Finals series
3	Sydney Olympic	26	11	9	6	37	26	+11	31	Qualification for the Finals series
4	Melbourne Croatia	26	13	5	8	44	35	+9	31	Qualification for the Finals series
5	Preston Makedonia	26	11	8	7	31	24	+7	30	Qualification for the Finals series
6	Adelaide City	26	10	8	8	29	24	+5	28	
7	Sydney Croatia	26	10	8	8	25	25	0	28	
8	South Melbourne	26	9	8	9	44	37	+7	26	
9	Wollongong City	26	8	7	11	22	29	−7	23	
10	APIA Leichhardt	26	7	9	10	27	35	−8	23	
11	Sunshine George Cross	26	7	5	14	25	38	−13	19	
12	Blacktown City	26	5	9	12	28	50	−22	19	
13	Melbourne JUST (R)	26	5	8	13	24	37	−13	18	Relegation to the Victorian State League
14	Heidelberg United (R)	26	7	4	15	22	45	−23	18	Relegation to the Victorian State League

Updated to match(es) played on unknown. Source: rsssf.com
Rules for classification: 1) points; 2) goal difference; 3) number of goals scored.
(C) Champions; (R) Relegated

=== NSL Cup ===
==== Final ====
20 August 1989

Adelaide City	2–0	Sydney Olympic
Maxwell 25'; Vidmar 40'	Report

Hindmarsh Stadium, Adelaide
Attendance: 10,000
Referee: Don Campbell

=== State of Origin ===
19 August 1989

Queensland	2–3	New South Wales
Vogler; Hunter	Report	Nastevski (2); Gomez

Perry Park, Brisbane
Attendance: 4,100
Referee: Bill Monteverde
