= 2022 OFC Women's Nations Cup Final =

- Event: 2022 OFC Women's Nations Cup
Papua New Guinea	Fiji
(Papua New Guinea)	(Fiji)
2	1
- Date: 30 July 2022
- Venue: HFC Bank Stadium, Suva
- Player of the Match: Ramona Padio (Papua New Guinea)
- Referee: Shama Maemae (Solomon Islands)
- Attendance: 1,591

The 2022 OFC Women's Nations Cup Final was a football match on 30 July 2022 that took place at HFC Bank Stadium in Suva, Fiji, to determine the winner of 2022 OFC Women's Nations Cup. The match was between Papua New Guinea and hosts Fiji.

For the Papua New Guinea women's national team, this encounter is their second appearance at an OFC Nations Cup final and their first since 2010, when they lost against New Zealand. Papua New Guinea have come second on two other occasions in round-robin format tournaments, most recently in 2014.

For the Fijian women's national team, this encounter is also their second appearance at an OFC Nations Cup final and second consecutive final after playing in the 2018 edition, when they lost against New Zealand.

Papua New Guinea won the final 2–1 for their first OFC Women's Nations Cup title. The win also meant they qualified for 2023 FIFA Women's World Cup inter-confederation play-offs.

== Venue ==
The final was held at HFC Bank Stadium in Suva, Fiji, as all the other games in the tournament were. HFC Stadium was opened in 1951 and has since been renovated twice with the most recent of those two occasions being from 2012 to 2013. Owned by the Government of Suva City, HFC Stadium is the home of the men's Fiji team. The stadium hosted the 2015 OFC Champions League Final.

== Route to the final ==
Papua New Guinea
Round
Fiji
Opponents
Result
Group stage
Opponents
Result
Vanuatu
3–1
Match 1
Solomon Islands
1–1
Tahiti
2–1
Match 2
New Caledonia
3–1
Group B winners

Pos	Team	Pld	Pts
1	Papua New Guinea	2	6
2	Tahiti	2	1
3	Vanuatu	2	1

Source: OFC
Final standings
Group C winners

Pos	Team	Pld	Pts
1	Fiji (H)	2	4
2	Solomon Islands	2	2
3	New Caledonia	2	1

Source: OFC
(H) Hosts
Opponents
Result
Knockout stage
Opponents
Result
Tonga
3–3 (a.e.t.) (3–2 p)
Quarter-finals
Cook Islands
2–0
Samoa
3–0
Semi-finals
Solomon Islands
3–1

== Match ==
=== Details ===
30 July 2022
19:00

Papua New Guinea	2–1	Fiji
Gunemba 17'; Padio 28'	Report (FIFA); Report (OFC)	Nasau 42'

HFC Bank Stadium, Suva
Attendance: 1,591
Referee: Shama Maemae (Solomon Islands)

Papua New Guinea	Fiji

GK	1	Faith Kasiray
RB	2	Lavina Hola
CB	3	Margret Joseph
CB	4	Lucy Maino
LB	5	Olivia Upaupa	(substituted off) 89'
CM	8	Rayleen Bauelua
CM	16	Rumona Morris
RM	10	Charlie Yanding	(substituted off) 76'
AM	13	Ramona Padio
LM	9	Marie Kaipu	(substituted off) 60'
CF	12	Meagen Gunemba (c)
Substitutions:
FW	21	Sonia Embahe	(substituted in) 60'
FW	15	Arnolda Dou	(substituted in) 76'
DF	20	Gloria Laeli	(substituted in) 89'
Manager:
(England) Nicola Demaine

GK	1	Seruwaia Vasuitoga		(substituted off) 29'
RB	13	Veniana Ranadi
CB	15	Maria Veronika
CB	4	Mereoni Tora		(substituted off) 89'
LB	2	Filomena Racea
CM	11	Jotivini Tabua		(substituted off) 72'
CM	16	Sofi Diyalowai (c)
RM	7	Koleta Likuculacula		(substituted off) 88'
AM	6	Cema Nasau
LM	9	Trina Davis	(yellow card) 87'
CF	5	Vanisha Kumar
Substitutions:
GK	23	Selai Tokoisuva		(substituted in) 29'
FW	10	Luisa Tamanitoakula		(substituted in) 72'
FW	8	Anasimeci Volitikoro		(substituted in) 88'
MF	3	Adi Bakaniceva		(substituted in) 89'
Manager:
(United States) Lisa Cole

Player of the Match:
Ramona Padio (Papua New Guinea)

Assistant referees:
Maria Salamasina (Samoa)
Heloise Simons (New Zealand)
Fourth official:
Delvin Joel (Vanuatu)
Fifth official:
Lata Kaumatule (Tonga)

Match rules

- 90 minutes
- 30 minutes of extra time if necessary
- Penalty shoot-out if scores still level
- Maximum of twelve named substitutes
- Maximum of five substitutions, with a sixth allowed in extra time (Note: Each team will be given only three opportunities to make substitutions, with a fourth opportunity in extra time, excluding substitutions made at half-time, before the start of extra time and at half-time in extra time.)

=== Statistics ===
Statistic	Papua New Guinea	Fiji
Goals scored	2	1
Total shots	5	11
Shots on target	2	3
Corner kicks	6	9
Fouls committed	12	6
Offsides	1	0
Yellow cards	0	1
Red cards	0	0
