= 2022 OFC Women's Nations Cup knockout stage =

The knockout phase of 2022 OFC Women's Nations Cup began on 23 July 2022 and finished on 30 July 2022 with the final.

All match times are local (UTC+12).

== Format ==
In the knockout stage, extra time and penalty shoot-out are used to decide the winner if necessary.

== Qualified teams ==
The top two placed teams from each of the three groups, along with the two best third placed teams, qualified for the knockout stage.

| Group | Winners | Runners-up | Third place |
|---|---|---|---|
| A | Samoa | Cook Islands | Tonga |
| B | Papua New Guinea | Tahiti | — |
| C | Fiji | Solomon Islands | New Caledonia |

== Bracket ==
Quarter-finals
23 July 2022 – Suva
Samoa | 4
New Caledonia | 2
23 July 2022 – Suva
Papua New Guinea (p) | 3 (3)
Tonga | 3 (2)
24 July 2022 – Suva
Fiji | 2
Cook Islands | 0
24 July 2022 – Suva
Tahiti | 0
Solomon Islands | 1

Semi-finals
27 July 2022 – Suva
Samoa | 0
Papua New Guinea | 3
27 July 2022 – Suva
Fiji | 3
Solomon Islands | 1

Final
30 July 2022 – Suva
Papua New Guinea | 2
Fiji | 1
Third place
30 July 2022 – Suva
Samoa | 1 (5)
Solomon Islands (p) | 1 (6)

== Quarter-finals ==
=== Samoa vs New Caledonia ===
23 July 2022
16:00

| Samoa | 4–2 | New Caledonia |
|---|---|---|
| Fischer 35'; Stewart 51', 83', 90+5' | Report (FIFA); Report (OFC) | Uregei 45', 90' |

ANZ Stadium, Suva
Attendance: 120
Referee: Torika Delai (Fiji)

=== Papua New Guinea vs Tonga ===
23 July 2022
19:30

| Papua New Guinea | 3–3 (a.e.t.) | Tonga |
|---|---|---|
| Padio 63', 99'; Gunemba 70' | Report (FIFA); Report (OFC) | D. Vaka 29'; Loto'aniu 44', 109' |
Penalties
| Bauelua (penalty scored); Padio (penalty scored); Gunemba (penalty scored); Morris (penalty missed) | 3–2 | (penalty scored) Loto'aniu; (penalty missed) D. Vaka; (penalty missed) La'akulu; (penalty scored) L. Vaka; (penalty missed) Siale |

ANZ Stadium, Suva
Attendance: 200
Referee: Veer Singh (Fiji)

=== Fiji vs Cook Islands ===
24 July 2022
16:00

| Fiji | 2–0 | Cook Islands |
|---|---|---|
| Diyalowai 22'; Tamanitoakula 74' | Report (FIFA); Report (OFC) |

ANZ Stadium, Suva
Attendance: 400
Referee: Shama Maemae (Solomon Islands)

=== Tahiti vs Solomon Islands ===
24 July 2022
19:30

| Tahiti | 0–1 | Solomon Islands |
|---|---|---|
| | Report (FIFA); Report (OFC) | Maefiti 38' |

ANZ Stadium, Suva
Attendance: 600
Referee: Neeshil Varman (Fiji)

== Semi-finals ==
=== Samoa vs Papua New Guinea ===
27 July 2022
16:00

| Samoa | 0–3 | Papua New Guinea |
|---|---|---|
| | Report (FIFA); Report (OFC) | Yanding 44'; Gunemba 48', 78' |

ANZ Stadium, Suva
Attendance: 1,250
Referee: Torika Delai (Fiji)

=== Fiji vs Solomon Islands ===
27 July 2022
19:30

| Fiji | 3–1 | Solomon Islands |
|---|---|---|
| Nasau 14', 28'; Tamanitoakula 83' | Report (FIFA); Report (OFC) | Pegi 11' (pen.) |

ANZ Stadium, Suva
Attendance: 1,250
Referee: Delvin Joel (Vanuatu)

== Third place match ==
30 July 2022
16:00

| Samoa | 1–1 | Solomon Islands |
|---|---|---|
| Fischer 16' | Report (FIFA); Report (OFC) | David 40' |
Penalties
| Soifua (penalty scored); Lilii Moa (penalty scored); Uluvili (penalty scored); Tuatagaloa (penalty scored); Fischer (penalty scored); Stevens (penalty missed) | 5–6 | (penalty scored) Pegi; (penalty scored) Saepio; (penalty scored) Solo; (penalty scored) Nari; (penalty scored) Maefiti; (penalty scored) Joe |

ANZ Stadium, Suva
Attendance: 1,419
Referee: Torika Delai (Fiji)

== Final ==
30 July 2022
19:00

| Papua New Guinea | 2–1 | Fiji |
|---|---|---|
| Gunemba 17'; Padio 28' | Report (FIFA); Report (OFC) | Nasau 42' |

HFC Bank Stadium, Suva
Attendance: 1,591
Referee: Shama Maemae (Solomon Islands)

| Papua New Guinea | Fiji |

| GK | 1 | Faith Kasiray |
| RB | 2 | Lavina Hola |
| CB | 3 | Margret Joseph |
| CB | 4 | Lucy Maino |
| LB | 5 | Olivia Upaupa | (substituted off) 89' |
| CM | 8 | Rayleen Bauelua |
| CM | 16 | Rumona Morris |
| RM | 10 | Charlie Yanding | (substituted off) 76' |
| AM | 13 | Ramona Padio |
| LM | 9 | Marie Kaipu | (substituted off) 60' |
| CF | 12 | Meagen Gunemba (c) |
Substitutions:
| FW | 21 | Sonia Embahe | (substituted in) 60' |
| FW | 15 | Arnolda Dou | (substituted in) 76' |
| DF | 20 | Gloria Laeli | (substituted in) 89' |
Manager:
(England) Nicola Demaine

| GK | 1 | Seruwaia Vasuitoga | | (substituted off) 29' |
| RB | 13 | Veniana Ranadi |
| CB | 15 | Maria Veronika |
| CB | 4 | Mereoni Tora | | (substituted off) 89' |
| LB | 2 | Filomena Racea |
| CM | 11 | Jotivini Tabua | | (substituted off) 72' |
| CM | 16 | Sofi Diyalowai (c) |
| RM | 7 | Koleta Likuculacula | | (substituted off) 88' |
| AM | 6 | Cema Nasau |
| LM | 9 | Trina Davis | (yellow card) 87' |
| CF | 5 | Vanisha Kumar |
Substitutions:
| GK | 23 | Selai Tokoisuva | | (substituted in) 29' |
| FW | 10 | Luisa Tamanitoakula | | (substituted in) 72' |
| FW | 8 | Anasimeci Volitikoro | | (substituted in) 88' |
| MF | 3 | Adi Bakaniceva | | (substituted in) 89' |
Manager:
(United States) Lisa Cole

Player of the Match:
Ramona Padio (Papua New Guinea)

Assistant referees:
Maria Salamasina (Samoa)
Heloise Simons (New Zealand)
Fourth official:
Delvin Joel (Vanuatu)
Fifth official:
Lata Kaumatule (Tonga)
