= List of Australia women's international soccer players born outside Australia =

This is a list of players who have been capped for the Australia women's national soccer team in full international matches, as determined by Football Australia and who were born outside Australia. Players born in countries other than Australia may qualify for the Australian team through Australian parents or grandparents, or through residency in Australia and subsequent naturalisation as Australian citizens.

Players are listed below by birthplace who played for the senior Australian team.

== Brazil ==
- Dylan Holmes

== England ==
- Louisa Bisby
- Sandra Brentnall
- Julie Clayton
- Diana Hall
- Jill Latimer
- Denise Lofthoues
- Sharon Mateljan
- Jane Oakley
- Natasha Prior
- Carol Vinson

== Germany ==
- Christel Abenthum
- Sabine Buschmann
- Debbie Nichols

== Malaysia ==
- Kristine James
- Michelle Sawyers

== New Zealand ==
- Kate Gill
- Kim Revell
- Indiah-Paige Riley

== Scotland ==
- Sarah Cooper
- Kim Dunlop
- Collette McCallum

== Wales ==
- Rhian Davies
- Theresa Deas
- Tracey Jenkins

== Yugoslavia ==
- Vedrana Popović

== List by country of birth ==
| Players | Birthplace |
|---|---|
| 10 | England |
| 3 | Germany |
| 3 | New Zealand |
| 3 | Scotland |
| 3 | Wales |
| 2 | Malaysia |
| 1 | Brazil |
| 1 | Yugoslavia |

== See also ==
- List of Australia men's international soccer players born outside Australia
