= 2022 OFC Women's Nations Cup squads =

The 2022 OFC Women's Nations Cup was an international football tournament held in Fiji from 13 to 30 July 2022. The nine national teams involved in the tournament were required to register a squad of up to 26 players, including two goalkeepers. Only players in these squads are eligible to take part in the tournament.

The position listed for each player is per the official squad list published by the OFC. The age listed for each player is on 13 July 2022, the first day of the tournament. The numbers of caps and goals listed for each player do not include any matches played after the start of tournament. The nationality for each club reflects the national association (not the league) to which the club is affiliated. A flag is included for coaches that are of a different nationality than their own national team.

== Group A ==
=== Cook Islands ===
The squad was announced on 6 July 2022.

- Coach: (Australia) Gary Phillips

No.	Pos.	Player	Date of birth (age)	Club
1	GK	Thea Keith	25 October 1994 (aged 27)	(New Zealand) Lakes
2	FW	Matilda Auua	16 May 2006 (aged 16)	(Cook Islands) Puaikura
3	MF	Lyric Davison	4 November 2002 (aged 19)	(New Zealand) Manukau United
4	DF	Tasha Dean	23 February 1994 (aged 28)	(Cook Islands) Puaikura
5	DF	Tineke de Jong	26 May 2002 (aged 20)	(New Zealand) Manukau United
6	FW	Victoria Fatiaki	13 January 2005 (aged 17)	(New Zealand) Manukau United
7	MF	Elizabeth Harmon	9 January 1992 (aged 30)	(New Zealand) Ellerslie
8	FW	Adriana Hauser	2 October 2006 (aged 15)	(Cook Islands) Tupapa Maraerenga
9	MF	Tayla Hetherington (captain)	27 January 1994 (aged 28)	(New Zealand) Manukau United
10	FW	Penina Katuke	19 November 2005 (aged 16)	(Cook Islands) Titikaveka
11	MF	Kayleena Kermode	8 February 1999 (aged 23)	(Cook Islands) Tupapa Maraerenga
12	DF	Nicole Kimiora	14 September 2003 (aged 18)	(Cook Islands) Tupapa Maraerenga
13	DF	Poko Manuela	15 July 1989 (aged 32)	(Cook Islands) Nikao Sokattak
14	MF	Lee Maoate-Cox	21 March 1995 (aged 27)	(New Zealand) Ferrymead Bays
15	MF	Ngamata Moekaa	24 May 2002 (aged 20)	(New Zealand) Manukau United
16	MF	Clotilda Moetaua	4 August 2004 (aged 17)	(Cook Islands) Matavera Ngatangiia
17	MF	Tanga Morris	28 November 1996 (aged 25)	(Cook Islands) Matavera Ngatangiia
18	FW	Kura Mose	26 June 2004 (aged 18)	(Cook Islands) Tupapa Maraerenga
19	MF	Simone Nicholas	21 January 2001 (aged 21)	(Cook Islands) Puaikura
20	GK	Kimberly Uini	23 August 2006 (aged 15)	(Cook Islands) Matavera Ngatangiia
21	DF	Anzia Tere	29 November 2005 (aged 16)	(Cook Islands) Avatiu
22	DF	Teretia Teinaki	23 January 2002 (aged 20)	(Cook Islands) Puaikura
23	MF	Piri Tangata Murare	16 August 2001 (aged 20)	(Cook Islands) Avatiu
24	DF	Tia Strickland	17 September 2005 (aged 16)	(Cook Islands) Tupapa Maraerenga
25	DF	Claudean Robati	6 December 1988 (aged 33)	(Cook Islands) Tupapa Maraerenga
28	GK	Tupou Brogan	17 April 1984 (aged 38)	(Cook Islands) Tupapa Maraerenga

=== Samoa ===
The squad was announced on 9 July 2022.

- Coach: (Barbados) Paul Ifill

No.	Pos.	Player	Date of birth (age)	Club
1	GK	Ronisa Lipi	27 August 1995 (aged 26)	(New Zealand) Wellington United
2	MF	Sharon Tomokino	16 August 2004 (aged 17)	Unattached
3	DF	Alisa Tuatagaloa	8 May 2001 (aged 21)	Unattached
4	MF	Jaedeci Ulivii	2 June 2001 (aged 21)	Unattached
5	DF	Pulalasi Talalelei	11 October 2002 (aged 19)	Unattached
6	DF	Faith Lilii Moa	3 February 2004 (aged 18)	Unattached
7	MF	Iole Avenoso	27 January 1996 (aged 26)	Unattached
8	MF	Monique Fischer (captain)	19 December 1991 (aged 30)	Unattached
9	FW	Torijan Lyne-Lewis	15 June 1995 (aged 27)	(New Zealand) Palmerston North Marist
10	FW	Jayda Stewart	8 March 2002 (aged 20)	Unattached
11	DF	Shontelle Stevens	10 September 1995 (aged 26)	(New Zealand) Manukau United
12	MF	Lianna Soifua	6 September 2000 (aged 21)	Unattached
13	GK	Angelique Tuisamoa	3 March 2000 (aged 22)	Unattached
14	MF	Kaylani Lautaimi	5 April 2001 (aged 21)	Unattached
15	MF	Alisa Osborn	27 May 1993 (aged 29)	Unattached
16	FW	Faith Taeoalii	18 December 2003 (aged 18)	Unattached
17	DF	Khaleah Lewis-Vaike	17 October 1999 (aged 22)	Unattached
20	MF	Paige McCloskey	26 January 1999 (aged 23)	Unattached
21	FW	Sariah Taeoalii	5 July 2006 (aged 16)	Unattached
26	GK	Jecky Toma	28 April 1999 (aged 23)	(Samoa) Faatoia United

=== Tonga ===
The squad was announced on 9 July 2022.

- Coach: (Australia) Connie Selby

No.	Pos.	Player	Date of birth (age)	Club
1	GK	Meleana Taufa	27 November 2001 (aged 20)	(Tonga) Veitongo
2	DF	Meleseini Tufui	20 February 2000 (aged 22)	(Tonga) Veitongo
3	DF	Ofaloto Laakulu (captain)	9 April 1996 (aged 26)	(Tonga) Veitongo
4	MF	Ana Lauteau	6 August 2002 (aged 19)	(Tonga) Veitongo
5	DF	Patiola Tonga	15 December 2003 (aged 18)	(Tonga) Nukuhetulu
6	MF	Ana Polovili	4 March 2002 (aged 20)	(Tonga) Veitongo
7	MF	Mele Kafa	20 January 2002 (aged 20)	(Tonga) Nukuhetulu
8	MF	Fololeni Siale	8 June 1991 (aged 31)	(Tonga) Fahefa
9	MF	Finehika Finau	3 July 2002 (aged 20)	(Tonga) Fahefa
10	FW	Penateti Feke	7 January 1990 (aged 32)	Unattached
11	FW	Jazmine Loto’aniu	13 July 1999 (aged 23)	(Australia) Castlehill United
12	FW	Lositika Feke	10 April 2003 (aged 19)	(Tonga) Longolongo
13	DF	Daviana Vaka	11 August 2001 (aged 20)	(United States) Utah Avalanche
14	MF	Siunipa Talasinga	11 April 2002 (aged 20)	(Tonga) Veitongo
15	FW	Alexandra Fifita	4 October 1999 (aged 22)	(Tonga) Fasi mo e Afi
16	FW	Vea Funaki	26 May 1996 (aged 26)	(Tonga) Longolongo
17	MF	Kiana Swift	14 September 2000 (aged 21)	(Canada) Victoria Highlanders
18	MF	Laveni Vaka	11 August 2001 (aged 20)	(United States) Utah Avalanche
19	MF	Naomi Palanite	7 September 2004 (aged 17)	(Tonga) Longomapu
20	GK	Madison Tenifa	17 April 2004 (aged 18)	(Tonga) Fasi mo e Afi
21	GK	Hehea Taufa	17 May 2000 (aged 22)	(Tonga) Longolongo
22	FW	Toakase Kaufusi	30 April 1996 (aged 26)	(Tonga) Liviela
23	GK	Enisolo Fa	18 October 2001 (aged 20)	(Tonga) Hunga

== Group B ==
=== Papua New Guinea ===
The squad was announced on 6 July 2022.

- Coach: (England) Nicola Demaine

No.	Pos.	Player	Date of birth (age)	Club
1	GK	Faith Kasiray	20 December 1999 (aged 22)	(Papua New Guinea) NCD Hekari United
2	DF	Lavina Hola	27 May 1996 (aged 26)	(Papua New Guinea) Port Moresby Strikers
3	DF	Margret Joseph	4 January 1999 (aged 23)	(Papua New Guinea) Genesis
4	DF	Lucy Maino	2 August 1995 (aged 26)	(Papua New Guinea) Port Moresby Strikers
5	DF	Olivia Upaupa	12 March 1997 (aged 25)	(Papua New Guinea) Tusbab Laidamon
6	MF	Yvonne Gabong (captain)	26 August 1996 (aged 25)	(Papua New Guinea) Port Moresby Strikers
7	FW	Asaiso Gossie	18 April 2003 (aged 19)	(Papua New Guinea) Morobe Tulip
8	MF	Rayleen Bauelua	11 January 1995 (aged 27)	(Papua New Guinea) Port Moresby Strikers
9	FW	Marie Kaipu	16 August 1997 (aged 24)	(Papua New Guinea) NCD Hekari United
10	FW	Charlie Yanding	2 January 1997 (aged 25)	(Papua New Guinea) Bara
11	FW	Georgina Kaikas	10 April 1995 (aged 27)	(Papua New Guinea) NCD Hekari United
12	FW	Meagen Gunemba	4 June 1995 (aged 27)	(Papua New Guinea) Poro
13	MF	Ramona Padio	13 March 1998 (aged 24)	(Papua New Guinea) Port Moresby Strikers
14	MF	Kesai Kotome	20 December 1991 (aged 30)	(Papua New Guinea) Bara
15	FW	Arnolda Dou	20 December 2001 (aged 20)	(Papua New Guinea) Port Moresby Strikers
16	DF	Shalom Waida	15 February 2001 (aged 21)	(Papua New Guinea) NCD Hekari United
17	DF	Isabella Natera	24 December 1999 (aged 22)	(Papua New Guinea) Tusbab Laidamon
18	FW	Sagude Zale	13 May 2004 (aged 18)	(Papua New Guinea) Tusbab Laidamon
19	MF	Sandra Birum	6 June 1992 (aged 30)	(Papua New Guinea) Rainy Lae
20	DF	Joelyn Aimi	16 November 1994 (aged 27)	(Papua New Guinea) Lahi Power
21	FW	Sonia Embahe	23 October 1995 (aged 26)	(Papua New Guinea) NCD Hekari United
22	GK	Betty Sam	12 October 1992 (aged 29)	(Papua New Guinea) Poro
23	GK	Fidelma Watpore	9 February 1988 (aged 34)	(Papua New Guinea) Souths Hinamo
24	DF	Serah Waida	24 July 1998 (aged 23)	(Papua New Guinea) NCD Hekari United
25	MF	Rumona Morris	5 June 1993 (aged 29)	(Papua New Guinea) NCD Hekari United
26	DF	Gloria Laeli	25 March 1997 (aged 25)	(Papua New Guinea) NCD Hekari United

=== Tahiti ===
The squad was announced on 1 July 2022.

- Coach: Stéphanie Spielmann

No.	Pos.	Player	Date of birth (age)	Club
1	GK	Gelimma El Hadj Kaddour	6 June 2005 (aged 17)	(French Polynesia) Dragon
3	DF	Merehau Iotua	24 April 2002 (aged 20)	(French Polynesia) Tefana
4	FW	Babou Tepea	26 July 2002 (aged 19)	(French Polynesia) Tefana
5	DF	Julienne Naomi	28 June 2003 (aged 19)	(French Polynesia) Dragon
6	DF	Mariko Izal	1 November 1991 (aged 30)	(France) Jeunesse Villenavaise
7	MF	Kohai Mai	14 February 2004 (aged 18)	(French Polynesia) Dragon
8	MF	Tevahine Teriinohopuaiterai	27 January 2002 (aged 20)	(French Polynesia) Olympique de Mahina
9	FW	Ranihei Nui	20 June 1999 (aged 23)	(France) Montpellier
10	MF	Charlotte Rodriguez	11 July 1999 (aged 23)	(French Polynesia) Pirae
11	FW	Tahia Tamarii	8 May 2001 (aged 21)	(French Polynesia) Pirae
12	MF	Vahuariki Tufaunui	5 September 2002 (aged 19)	(France) Toulouse
13	DF	Tauahere Lin	16 January 2003 (aged 19)	(United States) Utah Utes
14	MF	Delani Guyot	4 November 1999 (aged 22)	(United States) North Carolina Fusion
15	DF	Raihei Tetauru	24 June 2003 (aged 19)	(French Polynesia) Olympique de Mahina
16	GK	Camille Andre	9 February 2003 (aged 19)	(France) Strasbourg
17	MF	Kiani Wong	21 November 2000 (aged 21)	(France) Lens
18	FW	Tetia Mose	9 August 2004 (aged 17)	(French Polynesia) Papara
19	DF	Mitiura Paint-Koui	30 October 2002 (aged 19)	(French Polynesia) Dragon
20	FW	Hinavainui Malfatti	19 December 2006 (aged 15)	(French Polynesia) Tiare Tahiti
21	DF	Gwendoline Fournier (captain)	16 April 1991 (aged 31)	(French Polynesia) Jeunesse Marquisienne
24	DF	Rereura Peu	5 June 1996 (aged 26)	(French Polynesia) Vénus
26	MF	Krystal Vivish	27 January 2005 (aged 17)	(French Polynesia) Dragon

=== Vanuatu ===
The squad was announced on 9 July 2022.

- Coach: Jean Robert Yelou

No.	Pos.	Player	Date of birth (age)	Club
1	GK	Vanissa Wilson	3 May 1993 (aged 29)	(Vanuatu) Galaxy
2	MF	Brenda Anis	18 March 1996 (aged 26)	(Vanuatu) Galaxy
3	DF	Selena Poida	21 March 2002 (aged 20)	(Vanuatu) Galaxy
4	DF	Nelly Kaltak	22 October 2003 (aged 18)	(Vanuatu) Galaxy
5	DF	Limas Erikan	29 January 2000 (aged 22)	(Vanuatu) Galaxy
6	FW	Jane Alatoa	14 April 1999 (aged 23)	(Vanuatu) Galaxy
7	MF	Rita Solomon	29 March 2001 (aged 21)	(Vanuatu) Erakor Golden Star
8	FW	Pauline Willie	20 August 1995 (aged 26)	(Vanuatu) United Malampa
9	MF	Cynthia Ngwele	21 September 2001 (aged 20)	(Vanuatu) Galaxy
10	FW	Daina Sine	20 November 2002 (aged 19)	(Vanuatu) Malapoa College
11	MF	Vanessa Keletia	1 July 2000 (aged 22)	(Vanuatu) United Malampa
12	DF	Netty Maeva Kalsau	20 February 2001 (aged 21)	(Vanuatu) LL Echo Senior Women
13	FW	Florida Willy	28 December 2001 (aged 20)	(Vanuatu) Huka 21
14	DF	Rinneth Siri	28 May 1998 (aged 24)	(Vanuatu) Tafea
15	DF	Noeline Erikan	24 December 2001 (aged 20)	(Vanuatu) Galaxy
16	MF	Liyo Eramol	5 July 2002 (aged 20)	(Vanuatu) Huka 21
17	DF	Elma Aiviji (captain)	13 April 1998 (aged 24)	(Vanuatu) Galaxy
18	DF	Noella Metoriki	28 January 2003 (aged 19)	(Vanuatu) NRTC Women’s
19	MF	Henriette Sangul	3 October 2003 (aged 18)	(Vanuatu) NRTC Women’s
20	DF	Louiza Zenza Nial	16 September 2003 (aged 18)	(Vanuatu) NRTC Women’s
21	GK	Melanie Siaban	16 March 1996 (aged 26)	(Vanuatu) Benben United
22	GK	Amelia Ready	8 March 2002 (aged 20)	(Vanuatu) Galaxy
23	MF	Shania Siri	12 May 2000 (aged 22)	(Vanuatu) LL Echo Senior Women
24	MF	Fevie Rina Siehi	8 April 1994 (aged 28)	(Vanuatu) Huka 21
25	DF	Annie Rose Gere	31 January 2001 (aged 21)	(Vanuatu) Benben United

== Group C ==
=== Fiji ===
The squad was announced on 8 July 2022.

- Coach: (United States) Lisa Cole

No.	Pos.	Player	Date of birth (age)	Club
1	GK	Seruwaia Vasuitoga	21 October 2002 (aged 19)	(Fiji) Rewa
2	DF	Filomena Racea	4 September 2001 (aged 20)	(Fiji) Tailevu Naitasiri
3	MF	Adi Bakaniceva	9 March 2004 (aged 18)	(Fiji) Tailevu Naitasiri
4	MF	Mereoni Tora	26 October 1998 (aged 23)	(Fiji) Suva
5	DF	Cecelia Nainima	20 May 1999 (aged 23)	(Fiji) Ba
6	MF	Cema Nasau	15 November 1999 (aged 22)	(Fiji) Labasa
7	FW	Koleta Likuculacula	17 August 2000 (aged 21)	(Fiji) Ba
8	DF	Aliza Hussein	23 July 2000 (aged 21)	(Fiji) Ba
9	FW	Trina Davis	6 September 2001 (aged 20)	(United States) Washington Rush
10	FW	Luisa Tamanitoakula	28 July 1998 (aged 23)	(Fiji) Ba
11	MF	Jotivini Tabua	25 January 1996 (aged 26)	(Fiji) Labasa
12	DF	Laniana Qereqeretabua	22 May 2002 (aged 20)	(Fiji) Suva
13	DF	Veniana Ranadi	16 July 1998 (aged 23)	(Fiji) Suva
14	DF	Unaisi Tuberi	9 September 1994 (aged 27)	(Fiji) Labasa
15	MF	Shayal Sindhika	12 March 1993 (aged 29)	(Fiji) Labasa
16	MF	Sofi Diyalowai (captain)	14 October 1993 (aged 28)	(Fiji) Labasa
17	MF	Evivi Buka	27 July 2004 (aged 17)	(Fiji) Ba
18	FW	Narieta Leba	18 August 2004 (aged 17)	(Fiji) Ba
19	DF	Angeline Rekha	29 September 2004 (aged 17)	(Fiji) Ba
20	GK	Mereseini Waqali	21 April 2004 (aged 18)	(Fiji) Ba
21	GK	Selai Tokoisuva	4 March 2002 (aged 20)	(Fiji) Nadroga
22	FW	Anasimeci Volitikoro	9 May 2002 (aged 20)	(Fiji) Labasa
23	DF	Maria Veronika	14 April 1999 (aged 23)	(Fiji) Tailevu Naitasiri
24	FW	Timaima Vuniyayawa	31 July 1998 (aged 23)	(Fiji) Rewa
25	MF	Vanisha Kumar	5 February 1995 (aged 27)	(Fiji) Labasa
26	FW	Imeri Nai	17 March 2002 (aged 20)	(Fiji) Rewa
28	GK	Merevesi Ofakimalino	30 March 1994 (aged 28)	(Fiji) Rewa

=== New Caledonia ===
The squad was announced on 20 June 2022.

- Coach: (France) Michel Berbeche

No.	Pos.	Player	Date of birth (age)	Club
1	GK	Lorenza Hnamano	29 September 2002 (aged 19)	(New Caledonia) Gaïtcha
2	FW	Claudia Wassin	1 February 2006 (aged 16)	(New Caledonia) FCF Académie
3	DF	Laurenda Simane	3 June 2006 (aged 16)	(New Caledonia) FCF Académie
4	DF	Josette Mole	9 November 2003 (aged 18)	(New Caledonia) Ne Drehu
5	DF	Marielle Haocas (captain)	9 June 1993 (aged 29)	(New Caledonia) Hienghène Sport
6	DF	Keytri Buama	15 June 1992 (aged 30)	(New Caledonia) Académie Féminine
7	DF	Lola Delavault	10 July 2003 (aged 19)	(France) Nîmes
8	MF	Drounuhe Sakilia	30 August 2005 (aged 16)	(New Caledonia) FCF Académie
9	FW	Jackie Pahoa	5 November 2001 (aged 20)	(New Caledonia) Académie Féminine
11	DF	Laëtitia Leme	13 February 2004 (aged 18)	(New Caledonia) Académie Féminine
12	MF	Shaya Ihmeling	9 January 1999 (aged 23)	(France) Porto Portugais Amiens
14	MF	Thérèse Pawawi	8 July 2005 (aged 17)	(New Caledonia) FCF Académie
15	DF	Clémence Friocourt	25 January 1990 (aged 32)	(New Caledonia) Hienghène Sport
16	MF	Christine Alikie	24 September 2005 (aged 16)	(New Caledonia) FCF Académie
18	MF	Alice Wenessia	24 July 1999 (aged 22)	(New Caledonia) Académie Féminine
20	MF	Elodie Hmej	12 January 2005 (aged 17)	(New Caledonia) FCF Académie
21	MF	Maryline Wassin	1 February 2006 (aged 16)	(New Caledonia) FCF Académie
23	GK	Irène Nigote	10 October 1995 (aged 26)	(New Caledonia) Académie Féminine
24	DF	Marthe Katrawa	20 November 2002 (aged 19)	(New Caledonia) Ne Drehu
25	FW	Jennifer Neporo	9 January 2004 (aged 18)	(New Caledonia) Wetr
26	FW	Sarah Uregei	2 January 1997 (aged 25)	(France) Colomiers
27	MF	Nasheng Ihmeling	12 August 2005 (aged 16)	(New Caledonia) FCF Académie
28	FW	Claudette Boa	28 October 1998 (aged 23)	(New Caledonia) Boulouparis

=== Solomon Islands ===
The squad was announced on 1 July 2022.

- Coach: Batram Suri

No.	Pos.	Player	Date of birth (age)	Club
1	GK	Margaret Kofela	17 August 1999 (aged 22)	(Solomon Islands) RSIPF Royals
2	DF	Rose Sambiru	24 December 2000 (aged 21)	(Solomon Islands) Koloale
3	DF	Claudia Votu	17 October 2000 (aged 21)	(Solomon Islands) Haura
4	DF	Lisa Solo	11 September 1998 (aged 23)	(Solomon Islands) Koloale
5	DF	Kalinsa Fiua	31 December 1998 (aged 23)	(Solomon Islands) Solright
6	MF	Mesalyn Saepio	25 November 1991 (aged 30)	(Solomon Islands) Koloale
7	MF	Almah Gogoni	28 December 2000 (aged 21)	(Solomon Islands) Naha
8	MF	Sandy Aniholland	9 September 1991 (aged 30)	(Solomon Islands) Solright
9	FW	Jemina David	4 December 1994 (aged 27)	(Solomon Islands) Frigates United
10	MF	Mary Maefiti	20 April 1994 (aged 28)	(Solomon Islands) Solright
11	FW	Ileen Pegi (captain)	18 July 1992 (aged 29)	(Solomon Islands) Koloale
12	GK	Corrina Rotoava	7 August 1998 (aged 23)	(Solomon Islands) Frigates United
13	MF	Agnes Gitoli	6 October 1998 (aged 23)	(Solomon Islands) Koloale
14	DF	Sharoly Saeni	25 January 2003 (aged 19)	(Solomon Islands) RSIPF Royals
15	DF	Edith Nari	28 August 2003 (aged 18)	(Solomon Islands) Solright
16	MF	Francina Mautai	21 February 1992 (aged 30)	(Solomon Islands) RSIPF Royals
17	MF	Jacklyn Ikama	25 May 1998 (aged 24)	(Solomon Islands) Naha
18	MF	Alisha Donga	12 April 2002 (aged 20)	(Solomon Islands) RSIPF Royals
19	FW	Sandra Wale	11 September 2003 (aged 18)	(Solomon Islands) RSIPF Royals
20	FW	Lorina Solosaia	6 July 2002 (aged 20)	(Solomon Islands) Frigates United
21	GK	Sylvester Maenu'u	8 October 1993 (aged 28)	(Solomon Islands) Koloale
22	DF	Rashida Mekawir	28 June 2001 (aged 21)	(Solomon Islands) Naha
23	MF	Merina Joe	5 May 1995 (aged 27)	(Solomon Islands) Koloale
24	MF	Hilda Sukona	13 February 1991 (aged 31)	(Solomon Islands) Frigates United
25	DF	Delmay Waihaho	27 August 1996 (aged 25)	(Solomon Islands) Solright

== Player representation ==
=== By age ===
==== Outfield players ====
- Oldest: (Cook Islands) Claudean Robati (33 years, 219 days)
- Youngest: (French Polynesia) Hinavainui Malfatti (15 years, 206 days)

==== Goalkeepers ====
- Oldest: (Cook Islands) Tupou Brogan (38 years, 87 days)
- Youngest: (Cook Islands) Kimberly Uini (15 years, 324 days)

==== Captains ====
- Oldest: (French Polynesia) Gwendoline Fournier (31 years, 88 days)
- Youngest: (Vanuatu) Elma Aiviji (24 years, 91 days)

=== By club nationality ===
Key
Bold	Nation represented at the tournament
Italic	Nation not an OFC member

Players	Clubs
26	**Fiji**; **Papua New Guinea**
25	**Solomon Islands**; **Vanuatu**
20	**New Caledonia**
18	**Cook Islands**; **Tonga**
15	(French Polynesia) **Tahiti**
11	New Zealand
8	France
5	United States
1	Australia; Canada; **Samoa**
17	Unattached
