= 1989 OFC Women's Championship =

Tournament details
- Host country: Australia
- Dates: 26 March – 1 April
- Teams: 5 (from 1 confederation)
- Venue: 1 (in 1 host city)

Final positions
- Champions: Chinese Taipei (2nd title)
- Runners-up: New Zealand

Tournament statistics
- Matches played: 11
- Goals scored: 35 (3.18 per match)
- Top scorer: (Chinese Taipei) Huang Yu-chuan (9 goals)

The 1989 OFC Women's Championship was the third OFC Women's Championship of women's association football (also known as the OFC Women's Nations Cup). It took place in Brisbane, Australia from 26 March to 1 April 1989. Five teams participated in the tournament, and a total of eleven matches were played.

Chinese Taipei won the tournament for the second time after beating New Zealand 1–0 in the final. The third place match between Australia and their B-side was cancelled due to waterlogged pitch.

== Teams ==
The following five teams participated in the tournament:

- Australia (also known as Australia Green)
- Australia B (also known as Australia Gold)
- Chinese Taipei
- New Zealand
- Papua New Guinea
- India withdrew after the team was refused permission to participate by the Indian government, which was "not satisfied it had reached a sufficiently high standard to compete".

== First round ==
Pos	Team	Pld	W	D	L	GF	GA	GD	Pts	Qualification
1	New Zealand	4	4	0	0	10	0	+10	8	Advance to Final
2	Chinese Taipei	4	3	0	1	14	3	+11	6	Advance to Final
3	Australia (H)	4	1	1	2	7	6	+1	3	Advance to Third place play-off
4	Australia B	4	1	1	2	2	6	−4	3	Advance to Third place play-off
5	Papua New Guinea	4	0	0	4	1	19	−18	0	

Source: RSSSF
(H) Hosts
26 March 1989

Australia	0–2	New Zealand
		Henderson 41'; Nye ?'

Perry Park, Brisbane
26 March 1989

Australia B	2–0	Papua New Guinea
Iannotta 28'; Oakley 70+2'

Perry Park, Brisbane

27 March 1989

Chinese Taipei	6–1	Papua New Guinea
Hsieh Su-chen 2', ?'; Huang Yu-chuan 8', 18', ?'; Che Hsiu-fang 47'		Eka 19'

Perry Park, Brisbane
27 March 1989

Australia	0–0	Australia B

Perry Park, Brisbane

28 March 1989

New Zealand	1–0	Chinese Taipei
Crawford 28'

Perry Park, Brisbane
28 March 1989

Australia	6–0	Papua New Guinea
Riddington ?', ?', ?'; Vinson ?', ?'; Priestley ?'

Perry Park, Brisbane

30 March 1989

New Zealand	5–0	Papua New Guinea
Crawford ?', ?', ?'; Campbell ?'; Henderson ?'

Perry Park, Brisbane
30 March 1989

Australia B	0–4	Chinese Taipei
		Huang Yu-chuan 10', 31'; Hsieh Su-chen 63'; Chen Yueh-mei ?'

Perry Park, Brisbane

31 March 1989

Australia	1–4	Chinese Taipei
Riddington 59'		Huang Yu-chuan 42', 48', 51'; Yen Chun-mei 70+1' (pen.)

Perry Park, Brisbane
31 March 1989

Australia B	0–2	New Zealand
		Crawford 38'; Pullen ?'

Perry Park, Brisbane

== Third place play-off ==
1 April 1989

Australia	n/p	Australia B

Perry Park, Brisbane

== Final ==
1 April 1989

Chinese Taipei	1–0	New Zealand
Huang Yu-chuan 51'

Perry Park, Brisbane

== Awards ==
1989 OFC Women's Championship winners

Chinese Taipei
Second title

== Statistics ==
=== Goalscorers ===
9 goals

- (Chinese Taipei) Huang Yu-chuan

5 goals

- (New Zealand) Amanda Crawford

4 goals

- (Australia) Janine Riddington

3 goals

- (Chinese Taipei) Hsieh Su-chen

2 goals

- (Australia) Carol Vinson
- (New Zealand) Wendi Henderson

1 goal

- (Australia) Leanne Priestley
- Angela Iannotta (for Australia B)
- Jane Oakley (for Australia B)
- (Chinese Taipei) Yen Chun-mei
- (Chinese Taipei) Che Hsiu-fang
- (Chinese Taipei) Chen Yueh-mei
- (New Zealand) Julia Campbell
- (New Zealand) Kim Nye
- (New Zealand) Deborah Pullen
- (Papua New Guinea) Geraldine Eka

=== Overall ranking ===
Team	Pld	W	D	L	GF	GA	GD	Pts
Chinese Taipei	5	4	0	1	15	3	+12	8
New Zealand	5	4	0	1	10	1	+9	8
Australia	4	1	1	2	7	6	+1	3
Australia B	4	1	1	2	2	6	−4	3
Papua New Guinea	4	0	0	4	1	19	−18	0
