= 1994 OFC Women's Championship =

Tournament details
- Host country: Papua New Guinea
- Dates: 14–20 October 1994
- Teams: 3
- Venue: (in 1 host city)

Final positions
- Champions: Australia (1st title)
- Runners-up: New Zealand
- Third place: Papua New Guinea

Tournament statistics
- Matches played: 6
- Goals scored: 23 (3.83 per match)
- Top scorer(s): (Australia) Cheryl Salisbury (New Zealand) Wendy Sharpe (3 goals each)

The 1994 OFC Women's Championship was the fifth edition of the OFC Women's Championship. Papua New Guinea hosted the tournament between 14 and 20 October 1994. The tournament was contested by three sides and played as a round robin. Australia won on goal difference after tying with New Zealand on points. They qualified for the 1995 FIFA Women's World Cup as a result.

== Participants ==
- Australia
- New Zealand
- Papua New Guinea

== Results ==
Pos	Team	Pld	W	D	L	GF	GA	GD	Pts	Qualification
1	Australia (C)	4	3	0	1	13	2	+11	9	Qualification for 1995 FIFA Women's World Cup
2	New Zealand	4	3	0	1	10	2	+8	9	
3	Papua New Guinea (H)	4	0	0	4	0	19	−19	0	

Source: RSSSF
(C) Champions; (H) Hosts
14 October 1994

New Zealand	2–1	Australia
Sharpe ?', ?'	Report	Forman ?'

Port Moresby

15 October 1994

New Zealand	2–0	Papua New Guinea
Baker ?', ?'	Report

Port Moresby

16 October 1994

Australia	7–0	Papua New Guinea
Pumpa ?', ?'; Salisbury ?', ?'; Casagrande ?'; Hughes ?'; Forman ?'

Port Moresby

18 October 1994

Australia	1–0	New Zealand
Murray ?'	Report

Port Moresby

19 October 1994

Papua New Guinea	0–4	Australia
		Salisbury ?'; Casagrande ?'; Hughes ?' ? ?' (o.g.)

Port Moresby

20 October 1994

Papua New Guinea	0–6	New Zealand
	Report	Dermott ?', ?'; Henderson ?'; Crawford ?'; Jacobson ?'; Sharpe ?'

Port Moresby

== Goalscorers ==
3 goals

- (Australia) Cheryl Salisbury
- (New Zealand) Wendy Sharpe

2 goals

- (Australia) Lisa Casagrande
- (Australia) Alison Forman
- (Australia) Sunni Hughes
- (Australia) Karly Pumpa
- (New Zealand) Donna Baker
- (New Zealand) Kim Dermott

1 goal

- (Australia) Julie Murray
- (New Zealand) Amanda Crawford
- (New Zealand) Wendi Henderson
- (New Zealand) Maureen Jacobson

Own goal

- (Papua New Guinea) Unknown player

== See also ==
- 1995 FIFA Women's World Cup qualification
