= Mahfuza =

Mahfuza is a Bangladeshi feminine given name. Notable people with the name include:

- Mahfuza Akhter (born 1990), Bangladeshi football administrator, member of FIFA Council
- Mahfuza Khanam (1946–2025), Bangladeshi academic administrator
- Mahfuza Khatun (born 1967), Bangladeshi swimmer
