= Warring (disambiguation) =

To be warring is to be engaged in organized violent conflict with one or more other belligerent groups or nations.

Warring may also refer to:

- Warring (surname), a surname
- Warring Kennedy (1827–1904), Irish-Canadian politician
