= Diana Hill =

Diana Hill may refer to:

- Diana Hill (painter) (c. 1760–1844), English miniaturist
- Diana Hill (scientist) (1943–2024), New Zealand geneticist

== See also ==
- Dana Hill, American actress
- Diana Hall, Australian soccer player
