= Alison Forman =

Australian soccer player

Personal information
- Full name: Alison Leigh Forman
- Date of birth: 17 March 1969 (age 57)
- Place of birth: Maitland, Australia
- Height: 1.64 m (5 ft 5 in)
- Position: Midfielder

Senior career*
| Years | Team | Apps | (Gls) |
| 1992–2005 | Fortuna Hjørring | 283 | |
| 1999–2000 | Northern New South Wales Pride | | |

International career^{‡}
| 1989–2002 | Australia | 77 | (7) |
- * Club domestic league appearances and goals as of 14:55, 4 July 2024 (UTC) ‡ National team caps and goals as of 18:11, 12 January 2014 (UTC)

Alison Leigh Forman (born 17 March 1969) is an Australian former soccer player. Forman played 77 times for the Australia women's national soccer team and played over a decade for Fortuna Hjørring in the Danish national league.

== Club career ==
Forman joined Fortuna Hjørring in 1992. She played 282 times for the Danish club until 2005.

== International career ==
Forman played for the Australia women's national soccer team at the 1995 and 1999 FIFA Women's World Cup finals and at the 2000 Summer Olympics in Sydney, Australia.

== International goals ==
| No. | Date | Venue | Opponent | Score | Result | Competition |
|---|---|---|---|---|---|---|
| 1. | 27 August 1994 | Russia | Russia | 1–0 | 3–0 | Friendly |
| 2. | 14 October 1994 | Port Moresby, Papua New Guinea | New Zealand | 1–0 | 1–2 | 1994 OFC Women's Championship |
| 3. | 16 October 1994 | Port Moresby, Papua New Guinea | Papua New Guinea | 7–0 | 7–2 | 1994 OFC Women's Championship |
| 4. | 13 May 1995 | Vancouver, Canada | Canada | 2–0 | 3–0 | Friendly |
| 5. | 9 October 1998 | Mt Smart Stadium, Auckland, New Zealand | American Samoa | 12–0 | 21–0 | 1998 OFC Women's Championship |
| 6. | 13 January 2000 | Adelaide, Australia | United States | 1–2 | 1–3 | Friendly |
| 7. | 11 August 2000 | Pyongyang, North Korea | North Korea | 1–1 | 1–2 | Friendly |
