= Warring (surname) =

Warring is a surname. Notable people with the surname include:

- James Warring (born 1958), American boxer
- Kahale Warring (born 1997), American football player
- Lynne Warring (born 1963), New Zealand footballer

== See also ==
- Waring
