= 1986 OFC Women's Championship =

Tournament details
- Host country: New Zealand
- Dates: 29 March – 5 April
- Teams: 4 (from 1 confederation)
- Venue: 1 (in 1 host city)

Final positions
- Champions: Chinese Taipei (1st title)
- Runners-up: Australia
- Third place: New Zealand
- Fourth place: New Zealand B

Tournament statistics
- Matches played: 8
- Goals scored: 16 (2 per match)
- Top scorer: (Chinese Taipei) Liu Yu-chu (3 goals)

The 1986 OFC Women's Championship was the second OFC Women's Championship of women's association football (also known as the OFC Women's Nations Cup). It took place in Christchurch, New Zealand from 29 March to 5 April 1986. Four teams participated in the tournament, and a total of eight matches were played.

Chinese Taipei defeated Australia 4–1 in the final to win the second edition of the tournament. Defending champions New Zealand finished third, after winning to their B-side in penalty shoot-outs.

== Teams ==
The following four teams participated in the tournament:

- Australia
- Chinese Taipei
- New Zealand
- Papua New Guinea (withdrew)
- New Zealand B entered following the late withdrawal of Papua New Guinea.

== Results ==
=== First round ===
Pos	Team	Pld	W	D	L	GF	GA	GD	Pts	Qualification
1	Chinese Taipei	3	3	0	0	4	1	+3	6	Advanced to Final
2	Australia	3	2	0	1	3	2	+1	4	Advanced to Final
3	New Zealand	3	1	0	2	3	3	0	2	Advanced to Third place play-off
4	New Zealand B	3	0	0	3	1	5	−4	0	Advanced to Third place play-off

Source: RSSSF
29 March 1986

New Zealand B	0–1	Chinese Taipei
		Ma Wei-chiu 34'

Christchurch
29 March 1986

New Zealand	0–1	Australia
		Iserief ?'

Christchurch
Referee: Chou I-fa (Chinese Taipei)

31 March 1986

Chinese Taipei	1–0	Australia
Chou Tai-ying HT+15' (pen.)

Christchurch
31 March 1986

New Zealand	2–0	New Zealand B
Sharpe ?', ?'

Christchurch

2 April 1986

New Zealand	1–2	Chinese Taipei
Jacobson HT+20' (pen.)		Liu Yu-chu 22'; Chou Tai-ying HT+15'

Christchurch
2 April 1986

New Zealand B	1–2	Australia
Bradley ?'		Monteath ?' (pen.); Mateljan ?'

Christchurch

=== Third place play-off ===
4 April 1986

New Zealand	0–0 (a.e.t.)	New Zealand B
Penalties
	3–1

Christchurch

=== Final ===
4 April 1986

Chinese Taipei	4–1	Australia
Liu Yu-chu HT+4', HT+11'; Yang Hsiu-chih HT+18'; Hsieh Hsiu-min FT+3'		Martin HT+15'

Christchurch

== Awards ==
1986 OFC Women's Championship winners

Chinese Taipei
First title

== Statistics ==
=== Goalscorers ===
3 goals

- (Chinese Taipei) Liu Yu-chu

2 goals

- (Chinese Taipei) Chou Tai-ying
- (New Zealand) Wendy Sharpe

1 goal

- (Australia) Renaye Iserief
- (Australia) Andrea Martin
- (Australia) Sharon Mateljan
- (Australia) Sue Monteath
- (Chinese Taipei) Yang Hsiu-chih
- (Chinese Taipei) Hsie Hsiu-min
- (Chinese Taipei) Ma Wei-chiu
- (New Zealand) Maureen Jacobson
- Jo Bradley (for New Zealand B)
