= Dorcas Sesevo =

Papua New Guinean footballer

Personal information
- Date of birth: 22 March 1987 (age 39)
- Position: Defender

Team information
- Current team: POM

Senior career*
Years	Team	Apps	(Gls)
- POM

International career^{‡}
2019–	Papua New Guinea	2	(0)
- * Club domestic league appearances and goals ‡ National team caps and goals as of 18 July 2019

Dorcas Sesevo (born 22 March 1987) is a Papua New Guinean footballer who plays as a defender for POM FC and the Papua New Guinea women's national team.
