= OFC Women's Nations Cup =

- Organiser(s): OFC
- Founded: 1983; 43 years ago
- Region: Oceania
- Teams: 11 (finals)
- Related competitions: OFC Men's Nations Cup
- Current champions: Solomon Islands (1st title)
- Most championships: New Zealand (6 titles)
- Website: ofcwomensnationscup
- 2025 OFC Women's Nations Cup

The OFC Women's Nations Cup (previously known as the OFC Women's Championship) is a women's association football tournament for national teams that belong to the Oceania Football Confederation (OFC). It was held every three years from 1983 to 1989. Currently, the tournament is held at irregular intervals. Of the 13 tournaments that have been held, New Zealand won six of them.

The competition served as a qualifying tournament for the FIFA Women's World Cup from 1991 to 2022. In 2007, the competition took place in Papua New Guinea for the second time. Tonga and the Solomon Islands each took part for the first time in the four-team event, which was plagued by withdrawals from six squads.

The most recent edition was played in July 2025 in Fiji and was won by the Solomon Islands for the first time.

Only five nations have won the trophy: Australia (3 times), New Zealand (6 times), Chinese Taipei (2 times), Papua New Guinea (1 time), and the Solomon Islands (1 time).

Australia ceased to be a member of the OFC on 1 January 2006, having elected to join the Asian Football Confederation (AFC), and hence no longer participate in the tournament.

== History ==
=== First Tournaments (1983–1989) ===
The OFC Women's Nations Cup started in 1983 (as the OFC Women's Championship). The first edition took place in New Caledonia, and was won by New Zealand, after defeating Australia 3–2 in Nouméa. New Caledonia and Fiji also participated in this edition. The following edition in 1986, saw New Zealand hosting the tournament. The tournament was won by guests Chinese Taipei, after beating Australia 4–1. A second New Zealand team also played in this tournament following the withdrawal of Papua New Guinea.

Chinese Taipei won again in 1989, on Australian soil, against New Zealand. This edition marked the debut of Papua New Guinea, who lost all of its games.

=== First World Cup qualifiers (1991–1995) ===
The tournament returned in 1991, again in Australia; with only three teams: the hosts, New Zealand and Papua New Guinea. This competition also served as the qualifying process for the 1991 FIFA Women's World Cup. New Zealand finished first and qualified for the World Cup.

In 1995, Papua New Guinea was the host. This edition featured the same teams from the previous edition. Australia won the tournament this time and qualified for the 1995 FIFA Women's World Cup in Sweden.

=== 1998 to today ===
The American Samoa and Samoa made their debuts in 1998. This time, the competition took place in Australia, and was won by them. The country won again in 2003. This was their last participation on the championship before moving to the Asian Football Confederation in 2006.

The following editions were all won by New Zealand, with Papua New Guinea in the second place.

== Results ==
The top four placed teams so far were:

Ed.	Year	Hosts	Final			Third place play-off			Number of teams
Ed.	Year	Hosts	Winners	Score	Runners-up	Third place	Score	Fourth place	Number of teams
1	1983	New Caledonia	New Zealand	3–2	Australia	New Caledonia	Round robin	Fiji	4
2	1986	New Zealand	Chinese Taipei	4–1	Australia	New Zealand	0–0 (a.e.t.) (3–1 p)	New Zealand B	4
3	1989	Australia	Chinese Taipei	1–0	New Zealand	Australia (Note: The third place play-off scheduled to take place between Australia and Australia B was cancelled due to a waterlogged pitch, so their group standings were used.)	Round robin	Australia B	5
4	1991	Australia	New Zealand	Round robin	Australia	Papua New Guinea	N/A		3
5	1994	Papua New Guinea	Australia	Round robin	New Zealand	Papua New Guinea	N/A		3
6	1998	New Zealand	Australia	3–1	New Zealand	Papua New Guinea	7–1	Fiji	6
7	2003	Australia	Australia	Round robin	New Zealand	Papua New Guinea	Round robin	Samoa	5
8	2007	Papua New Guinea	New Zealand	Round robin	Papua New Guinea	Tonga	Round robin	Solomon Islands	4
9	2010	New Zealand	New Zealand	11–0	Papua New Guinea	Cook Islands	2–0	Solomon Islands	8
10	2014	Papua New Guinea	New Zealand	Round robin	Papua New Guinea	Cook Islands	Round robin	Tonga	4
11	2018	New Caledonia	New Zealand	8–0	Fiji	Papua New Guinea	7–1	New Caledonia	8
12	2022	Fiji	Papua New Guinea	2–1	Fiji	Solomon Islands	1–1 (6–5 p)	Samoa	9
13	2025	Fiji	Solomon Islands	3–2 (a.e.t.)	Papua New Guinea	Samoa	2–0	Fiji	8

=== Teams reaching the top four ===
Team	Champions	Runners-up	Third place	Fourth place
New Zealand	6 (1983, 1991, 2007, 2010, 2014, 2018)	4 (1989, 1994, 1998, 2003)	1 (1986)	–
Australia (Note: Former OFC member, but now a member of the Asian Football Confederation.)	3 (1994, 1998, 2003)	3 (1983, 1986, 1991)	1 (1989)	–
Chinese Taipei	2 (1986, 1989)	–	–	–
Papua New Guinea	1 (2022)	4 (2007, 2010, 2014, 2025)	5 (1991, 1994, 1998, 2003, 2018)	–
Solomon Islands	1 (2025)	–	1 (2022)	2 (2007, 2010)
Fiji	–	2 (2018, 2022)	–	3 (1983, 1998, 2025)
Cook Islands	–	–	2 (2010, 2014)	–
Samoa	–	–	1 (2025)	2 (2003, 2022)
New Caledonia	–	–	1 (1983)	1 (2018)
Tonga	–	–	1 (2007)	1 (2014)
Australia B	–	–	1 (1989)	–
New Zealand B	–	–	–	1 (1986)

=== Participating nations ===
A total of 15 teams have participated in the tournament, including all 11 current full OFC members (associate members are not allowed entry). Additionally, former OFC members Australia and Chinese Taipei previously participated. The secondary teams of Australia and New Zealand also each participated once.

India were set to enter the 1989 tournament as invited guests, but withdrew after being refused permission to participate by the Indian government.

Legend

- 1st – Champions
- 2nd – Runners-up
- 3rd – Third place
- 4th – Fourth place
- GS – Group stage
- Q – Qualified
- • – Did not qualify
- × – Withdrew
- No longer OFC member
- — Hosts

Team	(New Caledonia) 1983	(New Zealand) 1986	(Australia) 1989	(Australia) 1991	(Papua New Guinea) 1994	(New Zealand) 1998	(Australia) 2003	(Papua New Guinea) 2007	(New Zealand) 2010	(Papua New Guinea) 2014	(New Caledonia) 2018	(Fiji) 2022	(Fiji) 2025	Total
New Zealand	1st	3rd	2nd	1st	2nd	2nd	2nd	1st	1st	1st	1st	—	—	11
Papua New Guinea	—	×	5th	3rd	3rd	3rd	3rd	2nd	2nd	2nd	3rd	1st	2nd	11
Australia	2nd	2nd	3rd (Note: The third place play-off scheduled to take place between Australia and Australia B was cancelled due to waterlogged pitch, so their group standings are used.)	2nd	1st	1st	1st							7
Cook Islands	—	—	—	—	—	—	5th	×	3rd	3rd	GS	QF	8th	6
Fiji	4th	—	—	—	—	4th	×	×	GS	—	2nd	2nd	4th	6
Tonga	—	—	—	—	—	—	×	3rd	GS	4th	GS	QF	7th	6
Samoa	—	—	—	—	—	GS	4th	×	—	—	GS	4th	3rd	5
Solomon Islands	—	—	—	—	—	—	—	4th	4th	—	•	3rd	1st	4
Tahiti	—	—	—	—	—	—	×	×	GS	—	GS	QF	6th	4
New Caledonia	3rd (Note: New Caledonia participated and hosted the tournament in 1983, but were not a member of the OFC or FIFA until 2004.)	—	—	—	—	—	—	×	—	—	4th	QF	—	3
Vanuatu	—	—	—	—	—	—	×	×	GS	—	•	GS	5th	3
Chinese Taipei	—	1st	1st											2
American Samoa	—	—	—	—	—	GS	×	—	—	—	•	—	—	1
Australia B (Note: Secondary national team.)	—	—	4th	—	—	—	—							1
New Zealand B	—	4th	—	—	—	—	—	—	—	—	—	—	—	1
