= Hackås =

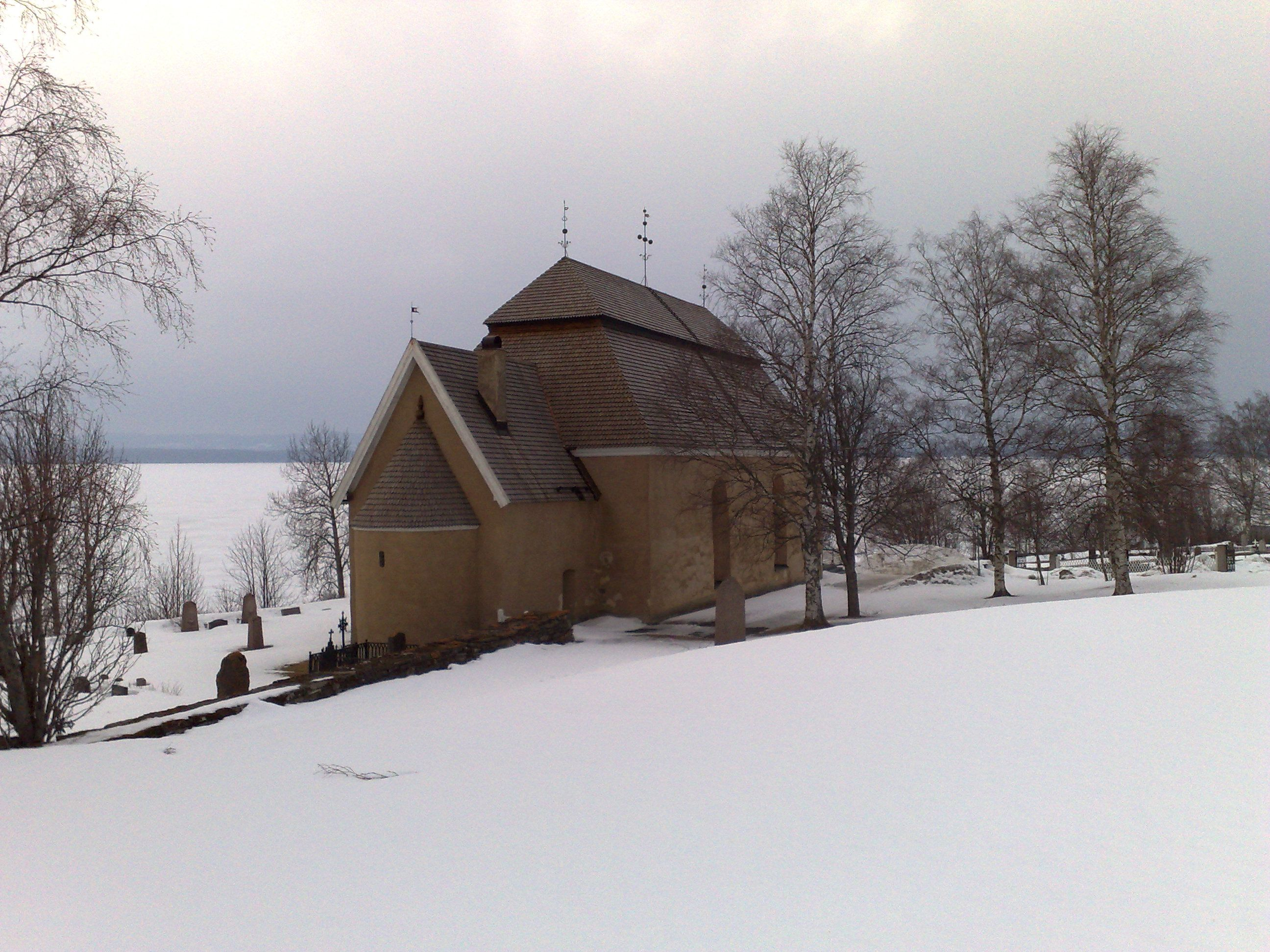
- Hackås Church

- Location within Jämtland Location within Sweden
- Coordinates: 62°55′35″N 14°31′07″E
- Country: Sweden
- Province: Jämtland
- County: Jämtland County
- Municipality: Berg Municipality

Area
  - Total: 0.92 km^{2} (0.36 sq mi)

Population (31 December 2010)
  - Total: 480
  - Density: 522/km^{2} (1,350/sq mi)
- Time zone: UTC+1 (CET)
  - Summer (DST): UTC+2 (CEST)

Hackås is a locality situated in Berg Municipality, Jämtland County, Sweden with 480 inhabitants in 2010.

Hackås Court District, or Hackås tingslag, was a district of Jämtland in Sweden. The provinces in Norrland were never divided into hundreds and instead the court district (tingslag) served as the basic division of rural areas.

Hackås has a local sports club, Hackås IF.
