= Renaye Iserief =

Australian soccer player

Personal information
- Position: Forward

International career
Years	Team	Apps	(Gls)
1983–1989	Australia	16	(9)

Renaye Iserief was an Australian soccer player who participated at the 1986 OFC Women's Championship. Iserief played 16 times for Australia and scored 9 goals.
