= Australia women's national soccer B team =

Australia B
- Nickname: Australia Gold
- Association: Football Australia
- Confederation: AFC (Asia)
- FIFA code: AUS

First international
- Australia 2–0 Papua New Guinea (Brisbane, Australia; 26 March 1989)

Biggest win
- Australia 2–0 Papua New Guinea (Brisbane, Australia; 26 March 1989)

Biggest defeat
- Australia 0–5 Russia (Gold Coast, Australia; 18 April 1994)

The Australia women's national soccer B team (often referred to as Australia Gold) is a secondary women's soccer team as support for the Australia women's national soccer team. They have played nine matches in their history and has been inactive since January 1999.

== History ==
The Australia women's B team first played in 1989, participating in the 1989 OFC Women's Championship alongside Australia A, Chinese Taipei, New Zealand, Papua New Guinea. They finished fourth out of five spots advancing to the third place play-off against Australia A, which was cancelled due to a waterlogged pitch.

The team entered the 1999 Australia Cup at the classification stages, taking part in the third place play-off match against Canada which was lost 1–0. This is currently Australia B's last match played.

== Results ==
Win Draw Loss

=== 1989 ===
26 March 1989 1989 OFC Women's Championship	Australia B	2–0	Papua New Guinea	Brisbane, Australia
	Iannotta 28'; Oakleigh (FT-2)	Report		Stadium: Perry Park
Note: Match was played in 70 minutes duration.

27 March 1989 1989 OFC Women's Championship	Australia	0–0	Australia B	Brisbane, Australia
		Report		Stadium: Perry Park
Note: Match was played in 70 minutes duration.

30 March 1989 1989 OFC Women's Championship	Australia B	0–4	Papua New Guinea	Brisbane, Australia
		Report	Yu-Chuan 10', 31'; Su-Chen 63'; Yueh-Mi (?)	Stadium: Perry Park
Note: Match was played in 70 minutes duration.

31 March 1989 1989 OFC Women's Championship	Australia B	0–2	New Zealand	Brisbane, Australia
		Report	Crawford (HT+3); Pullin (?)	Stadium: Perry Park
Note: Match was played in 70 minutes duration.

1 April 1989 1989 OFC Women's Championship Third place play-off	Australia	Cancelled	Australia B	Brisbane, Australia
		Report		Stadium: Perry Park
Note: Match was played in 70 minutes duration.

=== 1994 ===
18 April 1994 1994 Gold Coast Invitional Tournament	Australia	0–0	Australia B	Gold Coast, Australia
		Report

18 April 1994 1994 Gold Coast Invitional Tournament	Australia B	0–1	Russia	Gold Coast, Australia
		Report	Grigorieva (?)

18 April 1994 1994 Gold Coast Invitional Tournament	Australia	1–2	Australia B	Gold Coast, Australia
		Report

18 April 1994 1994 Gold Coast Invitional Tournament	Australia B	0–5	Russia	Gold Coast, Australia
		Report	Kononova (?); Merzlikina (?); Savina (?); Lisacheva (?)

=== 1999 ===
13 January 1999 Friendly	Australia B	0–1	Canada	Canberra, Australia
		Report	Hooper 89'	Stadium: Bruce Stadium; Attendance: 285; Referee: Ben Williams (Australia)

== See also ==
- Australia women's national soccer team
- Australia men's national soccer B team
