= Lola Delavault =

New Caledonian footballer (born 2003)

Personal information
- Date of birth: 10 July 2003 (age 23)
- Place of birth: New Caledonia
- Position: Defender

Team information
- Current team: Nîmes

Senior career*
Years	Team	Apps	(Gls)
2020–2023	Nîmes		

International career
- New Caledonia
- * Club domestic league appearances and goals

Lola Delavault (born July 10, 2003) is a New Caledonian footballer who plays as a defender for Nîmes and the New Caledonia women's national football team.

== Early life ==
Delavault moved to France at the age of four.

== Career ==
Delavault played for French side Nîmes, helping the club achieve promotion to the French second tier.

== Style of play ==
Delavault mainly operates as a central defender.

== Personal life ==
Delavault is a native of Noumea, New Caledonia.
