= 2022 OFC Women's Nations Cup Group B =

The 2022 OFC Women's Nations Cup Group B is the second of three sets in the group stage of the 2022 OFC Women's Nations Cup that will take place from 14 July 2022 to 20 July 2022. The group competition will consist of Papua New Guinea, Tahiti, and Vanuatu. The top two teams automatically qualify for the top eight knockout stage, while third place is comparatively evaluated to other third-placed teams based on the football ranking system for the last two berths.

== Teams ==
| Draw position | Team | Pot | Finals appearance | Previous best performance | FIFA Rankings |
|---|---|---|---|---|---|
| B1 | Papua New Guinea | 1 | 10th | Runners-up (2007, 2010, 2014) | 49 |
| B2 | Tahiti | 2 | 3rd | Group stage (2010, 2018) | 104 |
| B3 | Vanuatu | 3 | 2nd | Group stage (2010) | 121 |

== Standings ==
| Pos | Team | Pld | W | D | L | GF | GA | GD | Pts | Qualification |
|---|---|---|---|---|---|---|---|---|---|---|
| 1 | Papua New Guinea | 2 | 2 | 0 | 0 | 5 | 2 | +3 | 6 | Knockout stage |
| 2 | Tahiti | 2 | 0 | 1 | 1 | 1 | 2 | −1 | 1 | Knockout stage |
| 3 | Vanuatu | 2 | 0 | 1 | 1 | 1 | 3 | −2 | 1 | |

Source: OFC
Rules for classification: Group stage tiebreakers

== Matches ==
=== Vanuatu vs Papua New Guinea ===
14 July 2022
16:00

| Vanuatu | 1–3 | Papua New Guinea |
|---|---|---|
| Keletia 71' | Report (FIFA); Report (OFC) | Kaipu 34'; Padio 76'; Yanding 79' |

ANZ Stadium, Suva
Attendance: 865
Referee: Torika Delai (Fiji)

=== Papua New Guinea vs Tahiti ===
17 July 2022
16:00

| Papua New Guinea | 2–1 | Tahiti |
|---|---|---|
| Padio 28' (pen.); Gunemba 83' | Report (FIFA); Report (OFC) | Tamarii 90' (pen.) |

ANZ Stadium, Suva
Attendance: 150
Referee: Shama Maemae (Solomon Islands)

=== Tahiti vs Vanuatu ===
20 July 2022
16:00

| Tahiti | 0–0 | Vanuatu |
|---|---|---|
| | Report (FIFA); Report (OFC) |

ANZ Stadium, Suva
Attendance: 250
Referee: Torika Delai (Fiji)

== Discipline ==
Fair play points would have been used as tiebreakers in the group if the overall and head-to-head records of teams were tied, or if teams had the same record in the ranking of third-placed teams. These were calculated based on yellow and red cards received in all group matches as follows:

- yellow card = 1 point
- red card as a result of two yellow cards = 3 points
- direct red card = 3 points
- yellow card followed by direct red card = 4 points

| Team | Match 1 | | | | Match 2 | | | | Points |
| Team | Booked | (yellow card) (yellow-red card) | Sent off (straight red) | (yellow card) (red card) | Booked | (yellow card) (yellow-red card) | Sent off (straight red) | (yellow card) (red card) | Points |
|---|---|---|---|---|---|---|---|---|---|
| Papua New Guinea | | | | | 1 | | | | –1 |
| Tahiti | 2 | | | | | | | | –2 |
| Vanuatu | | | | | 3 | | | | –3 |
