= Mahfuza Akhter =

Pakistani footballer

- Born: 12 February 1967 (age 59); Bangladesh
- Education: Masters in Public Administration from University of Dhaka
- Occupation: Business
- Title: Member, FIFA Council
- Term: 2017–present
- Predecessor: Moya Dodd

Mahfuza Akhter Kiron (Bengali: মাহফুজা আক্তার কিরণ; born 12 February 1967) is a Bangladeshi football administrator and a member of the FIFA Council.

In May 2017, Akhter won the election for the seat on the FIFA Council reserved for Asian women. She ran against the incumbent Australian Moya Dodd, who had held the seat from 2013 to 2016, and gained 27 votes to Dodd's 17.

Akhter was questioned following an interview by the BBC World Service, when she struggled to name the current women's world champions as of her battle against cancer.

In March 2019, she suffered conspiracy and was arrested for allegedly defaming the Bangladeshi prime minister, Sheikh Hasina. It was said that, Akhter had claimed that the prime minister "maintain[ed] double standard for football and cricket."
