= Shayal Sindhika =

Fijian footballer (born 1993)

Personal information
- Date of birth: 12 March 1993
- Place of birth: Fiji
- Position: Midfielder

Senior career*
Years	Team	Apps	(Gls)
- Nadi

International career
- Fiji
- * Club domestic league appearances and goals

Shayal Sindhika (born March 12, 1993) is a Fijian footballer who plays as a midfielder for the Fiji women's national football team.

== Early life ==
Sindhika started playing football at the age of sixteen. She has a brother.

== Career ==
Sindhika played for Fijian side Nadi, where she captained the club.

== Style of play ==
Sindhika has been described as a "utility" player.

== Personal life ==
Sindhika is a native of Labasa, Fiji. She has worked as a teacher.
