= Jo Fisher =

New Zealand footballer

Personal information
- Full name: Jo Fisher
- Date of birth: 18 January 1962 (age 64)
- Place of birth: New Zealand

International career
| Years | Team | Apps | (Gls) |
| 1982–1991 | New Zealand | 14 | (4) |

Jo Fisher (née Graat; born 18 January 1962) is an association football player who represented New Zealand at international level.

Fisher made her Football Ferns in a 0–2 loss to Taiwan on 7 October 1982, and finished her international career with 14 caps and four goals to her credit.
