= Miriam Lanta =

Papua New Guinean footballer

Personal information
- Date of birth: 22 December 1972 (age 53)

International career^{‡}
Years	Team	Apps	(Gls)
2011	Papua New Guinea	5	(2)
- ‡ National team caps and goals as of 9 September 2011

Miriam Lanta (born 22 December 1972) is a Papua New Guinean former footballer. She has been in the Papua New Guinea women's national football team.
