= Linda Bunaga =

Papua New Guinean footballer

Personal information
- Date of birth: 13 February 1987 (age 39)
- Position: Goalkeeper

International career^{‡}
Years	Team	Apps	(Gls)
2011	Papua New Guinea	4	(0)
- ‡ National team caps and goals as of 9 September 2011

Linda Bunaga (born 13 February 1987) is a Papua New Guinean footballer who plays as a goalkeeper. She has been a member of the Papua New Guinea women's national team.
