= Delani Guyot =

American footballer (born 1999)

Personal information
- Date of birth: 4 November 1999 (age 27)
- Position: Midfielder

College career
Years	Team	Apps	(Gls)
2018–2019	Orange Coast Pirates	35	(13)

International career
2022–	Tahiti		

Delani Poerava Guyot (born 4 November 1999) is an American women's soccer player who plays as a midfielder. She has represented French Polynesia internationally as part of the Tahiti national team.

Guyot is from Costa Mesa, California and is of French Polynesian descent. She was educated at Estancia High School and Orange Coast College. She played soccer and basketball at high school.

Eligible for the Tahiti national team due to her Tahitian grandmother, she trialed for the team in December 2021. She was selected for the squad in the 2022 OFC Women's Nations Cup in July 2022.
