= Yasreen Begum =

Fijian footballer

Personal information
- Position: Forward

Senior career*
Years	Team	Apps	(Gls)
- Nadi

International career^{‡}
2010	Fiji	2	(0)
- * Club domestic league appearances and goals ‡ National team caps and goals as of 9 September 2011

Yasreen Begum is a Fijian footballer who plays as a forward. She has been a member of the Fiji women's national team.

== Club career ==
Begum has played for Nadi FC in Fiji.

== International career ==
Begum capped for Fiji at senior level during the 2010 OFC Women's Championship.
