= Hackås IF =

Swedish sports club

- Full name: Hackås idrottsförening
- Sport: soccer bandy,(earlier)
- Founded: 1935
- Based in: Hackås, Sweden

Hackås IF is a sports club in Hackås, Sweden, established in 1935. The women's bandy team has played two seasons in the Swedish top division. The women's soccer team played four seasons in the Swedish top division between 1978 and 1981.
