= Kristy Hill =

New Zealand footballer

Personal information
- Full name: Kristy Hiria Hill
- Date of birth: 1 July 1979 (age 47)
- Place of birth: Auckland, New Zealand
- Height: 1.78 m (5 ft 10 in)
- Position: Defender

Team information
- Current team: Three Kings United
- Number: 7

International career^{‡}
Years	Team	Apps	(Gls)
2008–2011	New Zealand	17	(0)
- ‡ National team caps and goals as of 9 March 2011

Kristy Hiria Hill (born 1 July 1979) is a New Zealand footballer player who played as a defender for Three Kings United.

Hill made her Football Ferns debut in a 1–0 win over Argentina on 16 June 2008 and was included in the New Zealand squad for the 2008 Summer Olympics, playing in one group game; a 0–4 loss to the United States. She was also part of the New Zealand squad at the 2012 Summer Olympics.
