= Jijilia Dugucanavanua =

Fijian footballer

Personal information
- Full name: Jijilia Waqabaca Luveni Dugucanavanua
- Date of birth: 30 June 1988 (age 38)
- Height: 1.66 m (5 ft 5 in)
- Position: Defender

Team information
- Current team: Suva

Senior career*
Years	Team	Apps	(Gls)
- Suva

International career^{‡}
2010	Fiji	3	(0)
- * Club domestic league appearances and goals ‡ National team caps and goals as of 4 October 2010

Jijilia Waqabaca Luveni “Titi” Dugucanavanua (born 30 June 1988) is a Fijian footballer who plays as a defender for Suva FC. She has been a member of the Fiji women's national team.

== Club career ==
Dugucanavanua has played for Suva in Fiji.

== International career ==
Dugucanavanua capped for Fiji at senior level during the 2010 OFC Women's Championship.
