= Kathrina Salaiau =

Papua New Guinean footballer

Personal information
- Date of birth: 29 September 1976 (age 50)
- Position: Defender

International career^{‡}
Years	Team	Apps	(Gls)
2010	Papua New Guinea	5	(0)
- ‡ National team caps and goals as of 8 October 2010.

Kathrina Salaiau (born 29 September 1976) is a Papua New Guinean former footballer who played as a defender. Nicknamed Cathy, she has been a member of the Papua New Guinea women's national team.

== International career ==
Salaiau capped for Papua New Guinea at senior level during the 2010 OFC Women's Championship.
