= Kim Dermott =

New Zealand footballer and softball player

Personal information
- Full name: Kim Dermott
- Place of birth: New Zealand

International career
Years	Team	Apps	(Gls)
1993–1996	New Zealand	11	(2)

Kim Dermott is a former association football player who represented New Zealand at international level.

Dermott made her Football Ferns début in a 0–3 loss to United States on 8 August 1993, and finished her international career with 11 caps and two goals to her credit.

Kim represented New Zealand in softball with the White sox and competed in 1994, 1998, 2002 World Series and Sydney 2000 Olympics.
