= Lynne Warring =

New Zealand footballer

Personal information
- Full name: Lynne Warring
- Date of birth: 1 December 1963 (age 62)
- Place of birth: New Zealand
- Position: Midfielder

International career^{‡}
Years	Team	Apps	(Gls)
1991–1994	New Zealand	4	(1)
- ‡ National team caps and goals as of 15 January 2009

Lynne Warring (born 1 December 1963) is a former association football player who represented New Zealand at international level.

Warring scored on her Football Ferns debut in an 11–0 win over a Papua New Guinea on 21 May 1991 and ended her international career with 4 caps and 1 goals to her credit.

Warring represented New Zealand at the Women's World Cup finals in China in 1991 making a single appearance at the finals in their 1–4 loss to China.
