= Sue Monteath =

Australian soccer player

Sue Monteath (born 26 July 1959) is an Australian former soccer player who played as a midfielder for the Australia national team between 1978 and 1987 and was captain from 1984 to 1987.
