= Leanne Priestley =

Australian soccer player

Personal information
- Date of birth: 27 December 1963 (age 62)
- Position: Forward

International career
Years	Team	Apps	(Gls)
1981–1989	Australia	13	(3)

Leanne Priestley (27 December 1963) is an Australian soccer player who participated at the 1989 OFC Women's Championship. Priestley scored twice at the 1987 Women's World Invitational Tournament.
