= Deborah Pullen =

New Zealand footballer

Personal information
- Full name: Deborah Anne Pullen
- Date of birth: 12 June 1963
- Place of birth: New Zealand
- Date of death: 8 May 2010 (aged 46)
- Position: Midfielder

International career
Years	Team	Apps	(Gls)
1979–1993	New Zealand	40	(6)

Deborah Anne Pullen (née Kok) (12 June 1963 – 8 May 2010) was an association football player who represented New Zealand at international level.

She made her Football Ferns debut in a 2–2 draw with Australia on 6 October 1979. She represented New Zealand at the Women's World Cup finals in China in 1991 playing all 3 group games; a 0–3 loss to Denmark, a 0–4 loss to Norway and a 1–4 loss to China. In her international career, she won 40 caps scored 6 goals.

She died of lung cancer on 8 May 2010.
