= Moya Dodd =

Australian association football player and administrator

Moya Dodd AO
- Born: 30 April 1965 (age 61); Adelaide, South Australia
- Education: University of Adelaide (LLB); University of New South Wales (MBA)
- Occupations: Lawyer; Football official
- Employer: Gilbert + Tobin
- Board member of: FFA (2007–2017); AFC (2009–2019); FIFA (2013–2016)
Association football career
- Position: Midfielder
Youth career
- 1979–1981: Port Adelaide
Senior career*
| Years | Team | Apps | (Gls) |
| 1982–1988 | University of Adelaide | | |
International career
| 1986–1995 | Australia | 24 | (1) |
- * Club domestic league appearances and goals

Moya Dodd AO (born 30 April 1965) is an Australian soccer official, a lawyer and former national team player. She is a former executive committee member of the Asian Football Confederation (AFC) and a former member of the FIFA Council.

== Football administration career ==
Dodd joined the board of Football Federation Australia (FFA) in 2007. In 2009, she was elected as a vice-president of the Asian Football Confederation.

In 2013, she was appointed to the executive committee of FIFA, the 27-member body which governs football, as a co-opted member.

In October 2015, Moya Dodd sent a submission in for a gender reform proposal. This was sent to the Chair of FIFA Reform Committee, Francois Carrard. In this proposal, Dodd's main goals were for women to have more inclusion in the decision-making process and for there to be a larger investment in the women's game. Following this proposal, in 2016, FIFA passed the proposal and added a requirement that every continent must have a seat filled by a woman.

In 2017, Dodd lost her place on the FIFA Council as the Asia female seat to Mahfuza Akhter Kiron of Bangladesh. Kiron beat Dodd by 10 votes, with a final vote of 27–17. Some were critical of the election results because in an interview with the BBC World Service Kiron seemed to lack knowledge of current women's world champions. On her Facebook, Dodd wrote, "Naturally I'm disappointed that I wasn't able to return to the FIFA Council today."

== Playing career ==
Dodd played 24 times for Australia, including 12 in full international matches. By the time Dodd was 21 years old, she was playing on Australia's national team, and later on became vice-captain. In 1988, she played in the first-ever FIFA world tournament for women. That tournament was a successful event that led to the first FIFA Women's World Cup in 1991.

== Legal career ==
Moya is a partner in law firm Gilbert + Tobin.

== Honours and awards ==
In 2016, Dodd was named the overall winner of The Australian Financial Review Westpac 2016 Women of Influence. In 2018, Forbes, ranked number seven in their list of Most Powerful Women in International Sports.

Dodd was appointed as an Officer of the Order of Australia in the 2023 King's Birthday Honours for "distinguished service to football as a player and administrator at the national and international level, as a role model to women, and to the law".
