= Diana Hall =

Australian soccer player

Personal information
- Full name: Diana Patricia Hall
- Place of birth: England
- Position: Defender

International career
Years	Team	Apps	(Gls)
1979–1980	Australia	4	(0)

Diana Patricia Hall is an Australian former soccer player who represented the Australia women's national soccer team four times in 1979 and 1980.
