= Janine Riddington =

Personal information
- Position: Forward

International career
Years	Team	Apps	(Gls)
1988–1991	Australia	6	(5)

Janine Riddington was an Australian soccer player who participated at the 1988 FIFA Women's Invitation Tournament. In her first game she scored the winning goal against Brazil for Australia.
