= Huang Yu-chuan =

Chinese football player from Taiwan

Personal information
- Date of birth: 17 February 1971 (age 55)
- Position: Forward

Senior career*
| Years | Team | Apps | (Gls) |
- Ming Chuan University

International career^{‡}
- Chinese Taipei
- * Club domestic league appearances and goals ‡ National team caps and goals as of 16 November 1991 (before the 1991 FIFA Women's World Cup)

Huang Yu-chuan (Chinese: 黃玉娟, born 17 February 1971) is a Taiwanese footballer who played as a forward of the Chinese Taipei women's national football team. She was part of the team at the 1991 FIFA Women's World Cup. On club level she played for Ming Chuan University in Taiwan.
