= Sandra Brentnall =

Australian soccer player

Sandra Brentnall (born 27 June 1962) is an Australian former soccer player who played as a forward for the Australia women's national soccer team between 1978 and 1983.

== Personal life ==
Brentnall was born in Nottingham, UK in 1962, daughter of Australian soccer player Mike Brentnall. She played soccer in Nottingham as a child on a boys' soccer team. In 1974, at 12 years old, she and her family immigrated from Nottingham to Perth, Australia.

== Career ==
Brentnall joined Australia women's national soccer team, the Matildas, when she was 17. She scored Australia's first international goal in 'A' Women's Soccer on 6 October 1979 against New Zealand during her debut game. She achieved the first hat trick for Australia, also against New Zealand.
She was inducted into the Football Hall of Fame Western Australia Hall of Champions in 1996, and into the Hall of Legends in 2012. She was inducted into the Football Australia Hall of Fame in 2014.
