= Olivia Upaupa =

Papua New Guinean footballer (born 1996)

Personal information
- Date of birth: 12 March 1997 (age 29)
- Place of birth: Papua New Guinea
- Height: 1.62 m (5 ft 4 in)
- Position: Defender

Youth career
- Tusbab Blue Kumuls

Senior career*
Years	Team	Apps	(Gls)
- Frigates United

International career
- Papua New Guinea
- * Club domestic league appearances and goals

Olivia Upaupa (born 12 March 2997) is a Papua New Guinean footballer who plays as a defender for Frigates United.

== Early life ==
Upaupa was born on 12 March 1997. Born in Papua New Guinea, she is a native of Madang Province, Papua New Guinea. Growing up, she attended Goroka Grammar School in Papua New Guinea.

== Club career ==
As a youth player, Upaupa joined the youth academy of Papua New Guinean side Tusbab Blue Kumuls. Following her stint there, Upaupa signed for Solomon Islands side Frigates United in 2024.

== International career ==
Upaupa is a Papua New Guinea international. During the autumn of 2016, she played for the Papua New Guinea women's national under-20 soccer team at the 2016 FIFA U-20 Women's World Cup.
