= Jane Oakley =

Australian soccer player

Personal information
- Date of birth: 25 June 1966 (age 60)
- Place of birth: England
- Position: Defender

Senior career*
Years	Team	Apps	(Gls)
- Berwick City SC

International career
1984–1995	Australia	28	(2)
- * Club domestic league appearances and goals

Jane Oakley (born 25 June 1966) is an Australian former footballer who played as a defender for the Australia women's national soccer team. She was part of the team at the 1994 OFC Women's Championship and 1995 FIFA Women's World Cup. At the club level, she played for Berwick City in Australia.

In 2004, she was inducted into the Australian Soccer Association Hall of Fame (HOF). In 2012, she was inducted into the Football Federation Victoria Hall of Fame.
