= Rumona Morris =

Papua New Guinean footballer

Personal information
- Date of birth: 5 June 1993 (age 33)
- Height: 1.64 m (5 ft 5 in)
- Position: Midfielder

Senior career*
Years	Team	Apps	(Gls)
- Madang Fox

International career^{‡}
2014	Papua New Guinea	2	(0)
- * Club domestic league appearances and goals ‡ National team caps and goals as of 29 October 2014

Rumona Morris (born 5 June 1993) is a Papua New Guinean footballer who plays as a midfielder. She has been a member of the Papua New Guinea women's national football team.

== Football career ==
Morris is from Madang. Morris first represented Papua New Guinea in the women's under-15 football team in 2010, and at the 2010 Youth Olympic Games in Singapore. She has captained the Papua New Guinea women's national under-20 football team. As of 2021, she had played for the senior team on 14 occasions. She missed the 2015 Pacific Games due to study commitments.

In 2021 she was awarded the Southern Conference Most Valuable Player award. That year, she returned to the Papua New Guinea squad for their 2023 FIFA Women's World Cup qualification matches.

== Rugby career ==
In March 2014, Morris was named to the training squad for the Papua New Guinea women's national rugby sevens team to contest the Hong Kong Sevens event. She later switched to rugby union.

== Personal life ==
Her father Bob Morris is manager of the Papua New Guinea men's team.
