= Amanda Crawford (footballer) =

New Zealand footballer

Personal information
- Full name: Amanda Anne Crawford
- Date of birth: 16 February 1971 (age 55)
- Position: Striker

International career
Years	Team	Apps	(Gls)
1989–2000	New Zealand	41	(11)

Amanda Anne Crawford (born 16 February 1971) is a former association football player who represented New Zealand at the international level.

Crawford scored the only goal on her full Football Ferns debut in a 1–0 win over Chinese Taipei on 28 March 1989 and ended her international career with 41 caps and 11 goals to her credit.

Crawford represented New Zealand at the Women's World Cup finals in China in 1991.
