= Wendi Henderson =

New Zealand footballer

Personal information
- Full name: Wendi Judith Henderson
- Date of birth: 16 July 1971 (age 55)
- Place of birth: New Zealand
- Height: 1.67 m (5 ft 6 in)
- Position: Striker

International career
Years	Team	Apps	(Gls)
1987–2008	New Zealand	64	(16)

Managerial career
- 2018: New Zealand (assistant)

Wendi Judith Henderson (born 16 July 1971) is an association football player who represented New Zealand at international level.

Henderson made her full Football Ferns debut as a substitute in a 3–0 win over Hawaii on 12 December 1987. She was for a time New Zealand's most capped female player with 64 caps and 16 goals to her credit, before Hayley Moorwood surpassed this total on 19 June 2011.

Henderson represented New Zealand at the Women's World Cup finals in China in 1991, and again in 2007, becoming the first New Zealand player to represent her country in two senior football world cups.

In 2018, Henderson served as an assistant coach for New Zealand at the 2018 OFC Women's Nations Cup.
