= Wendy Sharpe (footballer) =

New Zealand footballer

Personal information
- Full name: Wendy Sharpe
- Date of birth: 25 June 1963 (age 63)
- Position: Striker

International career^{‡}
Years	Team	Apps	(Gls)
1980–1995	New Zealand	53	(38)
- ‡ National team caps and goals as of 15 January 2009

Wendy Sharpe (born 25 June 1963) is an association football player who represented New Zealand at international level. Sharpe is New Zealand's leading women's international goalscorer.

Sharpe made her full Football Ferns debut in a 3–3 draw with Australia 18 May 1980 and finished her international career with 53 caps and 38 goals to her credit, her last cap being in a 0–2 loss to Australia on 19 March 1995.
