= Carol Vinson =

Australian football player

Carol Vinson is an Australian soccer player and former captain of the Australia women's national soccer team. Vinson played 13 times for Australia from 1988 to 1991 and scored 12 goals. In 1990 she played club football in Denmark for Fortuna Hjørring.
