= Papua New Guinea women's national soccer team =

Papua New Guinea
- Nickname(s): Lakatois (Motuan sailing vessel)
- Association: Papua New Guinea Football Association (PNGFA)
- Confederation: OFC (Oceania)
- Head coach: (Papua New Guinea) Eric Komeng
- Captain: Ramona Padio
- Most caps: Deslyn Siniu (43)
- Top scorer: Marie Kaipu (35)
- Home stadium: Sir Hubert Murray Stadium
- FIFA code: PNG
First colours	Second colours

FIFA ranking
- Current: 58 ▼1 (16 June 2026)
- Highest: 46 (December 2019 – December 2020)
- Lowest: 60 (June – September 2005; August – December 2025)

First international
- Australia B 2–0 Papua New Guinea (Brisbane, Australia; 26 March 1989)

Biggest win
- Kiribati 0–13 Papua New Guinea (Nausori, Fiji; 30 June 2003)

Biggest defeat
- New Zealand 16–0 Papua New Guinea (Sydney, Australia; 19 May 1991)

OFC Women's Nations Cup
- Appearances: 11 (first in 1989)
- Best result: Champions (2022)
Medal record
Women's football
OFC Women's Nations Cup
Gold medal – first place	2022 Fiji	Team
Silver medal – second place	2007 Papua New Guinea	Team
Silver medal – second place	2010 New Zealand	Team
Silver medal – second place	2014 Papua New Guinea	Team
Silver medal – second place	2025 Fiji	Team
Bronze medal – third place	1991 Australia	Team
Bronze medal – third place	1994 Papua New Guinea	Team
Bronze medal – third place	1998 New Zealand	Team
Bronze medal – third place	2003 Australia	Team
Bronze medal – third place	2018 New Caledonia	Team
Pacific Games
Gold medal – first place	2003 Suva	Team
Gold medal – first place	2007 Apia	Team
Gold medal – first place	2011 Nouméa	Team
Gold medal – first place	2015 Port Moresby	Team
Gold medal – first place	2019 Apia	Team
Gold medal – first place	2023 Honiara	Team

The Papua New Guinea women's national soccer team is controlled by the Papua New Guinea Football Association (PNGFA). Its nickname is the Lakatois, which is a Motuan sailing vessel. Their home ground is the Sir Hubert Murray Stadium, located in Port Moresby and their current manager is Peter Gunemba. Deslyn Siniu is the team's most capped player and top scorer.

Papua New Guinea has never qualified for a FIFA Women's World Cup or the Olympic Games, but won the Pacific Games Football Tournament on five occasions (2003, 2007, 2011, 2015 and 2019) and won the 2022 OFC Women's Nations Cup and was runner up three times (2007, 2010 and 2014). They can be considered the second-best team in the Oceania Football Confederation after New Zealand.

Papua New Guinea's FIFA ranking as of December 2022 is 51. Their highest ever ranking was 46 in December 2019 and their worst ranking was 133 in September 2014.

== History ==
=== 1989–1998 ===
Papua New Guinea played its first international game on 26 March 1989 in the Australian city of Brisbane facing the Australia B-side on the 1989 Oceania Cup. The match resulted in a 2–0 loss for the Papua New Guinean team. Geraldine Eka was Papua New Guinea's first scorer, in the lost game against Taiwan (6–1). In the two remaining matches, their rivals were New Zealand and Australia (senior team), with whom they lost both games. The Papua New Guineans finished on the bottom of the table, after being defeated in the four games.

The team participated on the 1991 and 1994 editions of the Oceania Cup, with the second being on home soil in the country's capital, Port Moresby. In both editions, they faced Australia and New Zealand, losing to them heavily. During that period, Papua New Guinea had its biggest loss, 16–0 with New Zealand. Both tournaments also served as the qualifiers for the first FIFA World Cup, held in China in 1991 and the second, in Sweden in 1995.

The Papua New Guineans won the 1996 Pacific Cup in Tonga with Miriam Lanta's help. In the same year, they managed to achieve their only draw with New Zealand.

The 1998 Oceania Cup in New Zealand saw a small improvement on the national team. They finished in the third position of the competition after beating Fiji 7–1 on the third place match. Other results include a victory over American Samoa and two defeats with Australia and New Zealand.

=== 2000s ===
After 5 years without playing any games, Papua New Guinea re-appeared with coach Francis Moyap, in the 2003 Oceania Cup, celebrated in Australia during April 2003. The Papua New Guineans finished third once again. This edition included two new rivals: the Cook Islands and Samoa, teams which they defeated by 5–1 and 5–2, respectively. Midfielders Lydia Banabas and Glenda Matthies were notable players in this competition. Papua New Guinea had an average attendance of 412.5 people per match.

On the same year, the Papua New Guinean squad participated in the inaugural South Pacific Games women's football tournament, held in Fiji during June–July. This time, the national team achieved their biggest victory in their opening match, 13–0 over Kiribati, with Deslyn Siniu scoring a total of six goals for her country. With 13 points, thanks to four victories, one tie and one loss, Papua New Guinea won the gold medal in this competition. This time, the Papua New Guineans had an average attendance of 800 people per match.

Despite having won the Pacific Games tournament, the national team did a regular performance at the 2004 Olympic qualifying tournament, where it faced Australia and Fiji in a round-robin system competition.

The team appeared in the 2005 Arafura Games tournament, and finished with poor results.

Without Australia in the OFC, Papua New Guinea hosted the Oceania Cup again in 2007. All the games were played in Lae. This time, the team won against their neighbors, the Solomon Islands and Tonga (in fact, by an own goal scored by Tonga's Mele Vaisioa Mahe Niukapu). In the last game, the team lost the chance of qualifying to the 2007 FIFA Women's World Cup in China after losing to New Zealand.

The Papua New Guineans won their second gold medal in Samoa in the 2007 South Pacific Games. In the group stage, the team had very impressive victories (6–0 against American Samoa; 4–0 against the Solomon Islands; 4–1 against the Cook Islands) and a narrow loss (1–0 against Fiji). It advanced to the semi-finals along with Tahiti, and won 5–0, allowing them to advance to the final game, where they confronted Tonga at the Toleafoa J.S. Blatter Complex. After a hard game, Papua New Guinea won 3–1 after extra time with the help of Daisy Winas, Ara Midi and Lydia Banabas. The aforementioned was the national team's top scorer again, with a total of eight goals. Thanks to this result, the Papua New Guineans qualified for a play-off against New Zealand to determine Oceania's representative at the 2008 Summer Olympics in Beijing.

Papua New Guinea played the Olympic play-off qualifier on 8 March 2008, but they lost 2–0.

=== 2010s ===
With an attendance of 60 people, the Lakatois started their 2010 Oceania Cup campaign facing Fiji at the North Harbour Stadium in Auckland, New Zealand. Papua New Guinea won the game 3–0 with a scoreline of 1–0 in the half-time. Both the second and third matches (2–1 against the Solomon Islands and 3–0 against Tonga, with an own goal of the Tongan goalkeeper Lupe Likiliki) resulted in victories. Papua New Guinea advanced to the semi-finals to beat the Cook Islands by 1–0. The final, played on 8 October 2010, saw the Kiwis and the Papua New Guineans struggling once again for the Oceania Cup title in front of an audience of 900 people. New Zealand finished as the champion for the fourth time, after thrashing Papua New Guinea 11–0. Zeena Limbai had a brilliant participation, after scoring four goals for PNG.

With one goal from Miriam Louma against Tahiti, the Papua New Guinean team started their 2011 Pacific Games road in New Caledonia, coached by Steven Mune. They achieved a second victory, against American Samoa, by 8–0, including an own goal. It was followed by a loss against the hosts, New Caledonia (2–1) and a victory over the Solomon Islands (1–0). The national team advanced to the semi-finals, where they faced Fiji, winning the game 4–0. In the gold medal/final game, the Papua New Guinean squad confronted the New Caledonians for the second time in the tournament. Christelle Wahnawe scored for the New Caledonians and Ara Midi and Linah Honeakii for the Papua New Guinean team, thus making 2–1 the final result. PNG received the gold medal for the third time.

PNG failed to qualify for the London 2012 Summer Olympics despite having a very good performance on the first stage of the qualifiers, played in Tonga from March to April 2012. They had an attendance average of 973.8 people per match.

With the former Australian footballer Gary Phillips as the squad's manager, Papua New Guinea started the 2014 OFC Nations Cup winning 4–1 on home soil, at the Kalabond Oval in Kokopo against the Cook Islands. The Lakatois were defeated by the Kiwis 3–0 in the second game. The tournament finished with a 3–0 win to Tonga. Meagen Gunemba was PNG's top scorer, with four goals, and goalkeeper Fidelma Watpore was awarded with the Golden Gloves.

The Lakatois had a tour on Southeast Asia in March 2015. They faced Singapore and Thailand.

The national team finished first in the Group B of the 2015 Pacific Games (on home soil), and had a victory against Samoa to advance to the final match, facing New Caledonia. Marie Kaipu gave the Papua New Guineans a fourth gold medal after scoring in the 21st minute.

The Lakatois' latest game was the 2016 Olympic qualifier against the Kiwis, which resulted in a 7–1 loss. A second leg was supposed to be played, but the Papua New Guinean team couldn't travel to New Zealand due to visa issues.

== Team image ==
=== Nicknames ===
The Papua New Guinea women's national soccer team has been known or nicknamed as the "Lakatois (Motuan sailing vessel)".

=== Home stadium ===
Papua New Guinea play its home matches on the Sir Hubert Murray Stadium.

== Results and fixtures ==
The following is a list of match results in the last 12 months, as well as any future matches that have been scheduled.

Legend

Win Draw Lose Void or postponed Fixture

=== 2026 ===
27 February 2026 2027 FIFA Women's World Cup OFC Qualification	Papua New Guinea	5–0	Vanuatu	Ba, Fiji
12:00 UTC+12	Padio 5'; Elipas 16', 90'; Kaipu 44'; Pala 62'	Report (OFC); Report (FIFA)		Stadium: Govind Park; Attendance: 100

5 March 2026 2027 FIFA Women's World Cup OFC Qualification	New Caledonia	0–4	Papua New Guinea	Ba, Fiji
12:00 UTC+12		Report (OFC); Report (FIFA)	A. Gunemba 73'; Kalapai 90'; M. Gunemba 90+4'; Maneo 90+6'	Stadium: Govind Park; Attendance: 50; Referee: Anna-Marie Keighley (New Zealand)

8 March 2026 2027 FIFA Women's World Cup OFC Qualification	Papua New Guinea	1–0	Fiji	Ba, Fiji
12:00 UTC+12	M. Gunemba 86'	Report (OFC); Report (FIFA)		Stadium: Govind Park; Attendance: 150; Referee: Beth Rattray (New Zealand)

11 April 2026 2027 FIFA Women's World Cup qualification	Papua New Guinea	1–0	American Samoa	Hamilton, New Zealand
12:10 UTC+12	Kalapai 45+1'	Report (FIFA); Report (OFC)		Stadium: FMG Stadium Waikato; Attendance: 481; Referee: Anna-Marie Keighley (New Zealand)

15 April 2026 2027 FIFA Women's World Cup qualification	Papua New Guinea	0–1	New Zealand	Auckland, New Zealand
19:10 UTC+12		Report (FIFA); Report (OFC)	Kitching 55'	Stadium: North Harbour Stadium; Attendance: 3,984; Referee: Torika Delai (Fiji)

28 November 2027 FIFA Women's World Cup qualification	Uzbekistan	–	Papua New Guinea	Salé, Morocco
16:30 UTC+0				Stadium: Mohammed VI Football Academy

1 December 2027 FIFA Women's World Cup qualification	Papua New Guinea	–	Chinese Taipei	Salé, Morocco
14:00 UTC+0				Stadium: Mohammed VI Football Academy

5 December 2027 FIFA Women's World Cup qualification	Papua New Guinea	–	Ghana	Salé, Morocco
17:00 UTC+0				Stadium: Mohammed VI Football Academy

== Head-to-head record ==
As of 8 October 2021

Against	Played	Won	Drawn	Lost	GF	GA	GD
American Samoa	3	3	0	0	23	0	+23
Australia	8	0	0	8	0	68	−68
Australia B	1	0	0	1	0	2	−2
Australia Defense Force	1	0	0	1	2	8	−6
Chinese Taipei	1	0	0	1	1	6	−5
Cook Islands	5	5	0	0	16	3	+13
Fiji	7	6	0	1	23	4	+19
Guam	1	1	0	0	1	0	+1
Kiribati	1	1	0	0	13	0	+13
New Caledonia	3	2	0	1	4	3	+1
New Zealand	15	0	1	14	2	96	−94
(Australia) Northern Territory	1	0	0	1	0	2	−2
Philippines	2	0	0	2	1	14	−13
Samoa	3	3	0	0	15	4	+11
Singapore	3	1	1	1	5	5	0
Solomon Islands	4	4	0	0	13	2	+11
Tahiti	3	3	0	0	9	0	+9
Thailand	2	0	0	2	1	18	−17
Tonga	7	6	0	1	15	4	+11
United States	1	0	0	1	0	5	−5
Vanuatu	2	1	1	0	13	3	+10
Total	72	36	3	33	157	247	−90

== Coaching staff ==
=== Current coaching staff ===
As of 4 February 2023

Position	Name	Ref.
Head coach	(Papua New Guinea) Eric Komeng	
Assistant Coach	(Papua New Guinea) Edna Thomas	
Goalkeeping Coach	(Papua New Guinea) Godfrey Baniau	

=== Manager history ===
Manager	Career	Played	Won	Drawn	Lost	Win %	Competitions
Unknown	1989–2003	17	2	1	14	11.8	1989 OFC Championship – Third place 1991 OFC Championship – Third place 1994 OFC Championship – Third place 1998 OFC Championship – Third place
(Papua New Guinea) Francis Moyap	2003–2010	29	16	1	12	55.2	2003 OFC Championship – Third place 2003 South Pacific Games – Champions; 2007 OFC Championship – Runners-up; 2007 South Pacific Games – Champions; 2010 OFC Championship – Runners-up
(Papua New Guinea) Steven Mune	2011–2012	14	11	0	3	78.6	2011 Pacific Games – Champions
(Australia) Gary Phillips	2014–2015	11	7	1	3	63.6	2014 OFC Nations Cup – Runners-up; 2015 Pacific Games – Champions
(Papua New Guinea) Rachel Wadunah	2016–?	1	0	0	1	0.0	2014 OFC Nations Cup – Runners-up; 2015 Pacific Games – Champions
Frederica Sakette	?–	0	0	0	0	—	
Spencer Justin	2023	2	0	0	2	0	

== Players ==
=== Current squad ===
- The following players were named to the squad for the 2025 OFC Women's Nations Cup between 4–19 July 2025.

Caps and goals as of 30 July 2022 after the match against Fiji.

No.	Pos.	Player	Date of birth (age)	Club
1	GK	Leah Lou	26 April 2000 (aged 25)	
2	DF	Raynata Samuel	10 August 2004 (aged 20)	(Papua New Guinea Football Association) Hekari United
3	DF	Pauline David	24 February 1999 (aged 26)	
4	DF	Shalom Waida	15 February 2001 (aged 24)	(Papua New Guinea Football Association) Hekari United
5	DF	Olivia Upaupa	12 March 1997 (aged 28)	(Solomon Islands Football Federation) Frigates United
6	DF	Serah Waida	24 July 1998 (aged 26)	(Papua New Guinea Football Association) Hekari United
7	MF	Ramona Padio (Captain)	13 March 1998 (aged 27)	(Papua New Guinea Football Association) Hekari United
8	MF	Mavis Singara	25 July 2003 (aged 21)	(Papua New Guinea Football Association) Hekari United
9	FW	Marie Kaipu	16 August 1997 (aged 27)	(Papua New Guinea Football Association) Hekari United
10	FW	Calista Maneo	29 September 2002 (aged 22)	(Papua New Guinea Football Association) Allies
11	FW	Nenny Elipas	25 May 2005 (aged 20)	(Papua New Guinea Football Association) Hekari United
12	GK	Emeliah Toks	28 July 2008 (aged 16)	(Papua New Guinea Football Association) Lae City
13	DF	Michaelyn Butubu	23 January 2003 (aged 22)	(Papua New Guinea Football Association) Hekari United
14	MF	Christie Maneu	17 August 2004 (aged 20)	
15	FW	Charlie Yandin	1 February 1997 (aged 28)	(Papua New Guinea Football Association) Lae City
16	DF	Merolyne Sali	30 October 1998 (aged 26)	(Papua New Guinea Football Association) Allies
17	MF	Phillis Pala	21 July 2003 (aged 21)	(Papua New Guinea Football Association) Hekari United
18	FW	Arnolda Dou	20 December 2001 (aged 23)	
19	FW	Keren Kalapai	22 August 2004 (aged 20)	(Papua New Guinea Football Association) Lae City
20	MF	Hortance Kimit	12 June 1995 (aged 30)	(Papua New Guinea Football Association) Hekari United
21	DF	Grace Batiy	14 October 1999 (aged 25)	(Papua New Guinea Football Association) Hekari United
22	GK	Lavina Hola	27 May 1996 (aged 29)	(Papua New Guinea Football Association) Mungkas
23	DF	Yvonne Gabong	29 August 1996 (aged 28)	

=== Recent call-ups ===
The following players have been called up for the team in the last 12 months.

Pos.	Player	Date of birth (age)	Caps	Goals	Club	Latest call-up

=== Previous squads ===
OFC Women's Nations Cup

- 2022 OFC Women's Nations Cup squad

Pacific Games

- Football at the 2023 Pacific Games squads

== Records ==
As of 10 September 2017

*Players in bold are still active.

=== Most capped players ===
#	Name	Caps	Goals	First cap	Latest cap
1	**Deslyn Siniu**	43	19	June 30, 2003	January 23, 2016
2	Miriam Lanta	31	5	April 5, 2003	September 9, 2011
3	Kathrina Salaiau	26	0	August 25, 2007	April 4, 2012
4	Lydia Banabas	24	15	April 5, 2003	October 8, 2010
5	Daisy Winas	22	5	August 25, 2007	October 29, 2014
6	**Sandra Birum**	21	8	September 30, 2010	January 23, 2016
7	Tracey Kigg	20	1	April 5, 2003	September 7, 2007
8	Julie Alau	18	3	April 5, 2003	September 7, 2007
9	Linah Honeakii	17	3	September 30, 2007	April 4, 2012
9	Linda Bunaga	17	0	August 28, 2007	September 9, 2011

=== Top goalscorers ===
#	Name	Goals	Caps	Average
1	**Ramona Padio**	31	24	1.26
2	**Meagen Gunemba**	28	22	1.25
3	**Marie Kaipu**	25	19	1.27
4	**Deslyn Siniu**	19	43	0.44
5	Lydia Banabas	15	24	0.62
6	**Sandra Birum**	8	21	0.38
7	Ara Midi	6	9	0.66
7	Zeena Limbai	6	9	0.66
7	Rumona Morris	6	14	0.43
10	Miriam Lanta	5	28	0.18
10	Daisy Winas	5	22	0.23

== Competitive record ==
=== FIFA Women's World Cup ===
FIFA Women's World Cup									Qualification					
Year	Result	Position	Pld	W	D	L	GF	GA	Pld	W	D	L	GF	GA
(China) 1991	Did not qualify								4	0	0	4	0	47
(Sweden) 1995	Did not qualify								4	0	0	4	0	19
(United States) 1999	Did not qualify								4	2	0	2	16	14
(United States) 2003	Did not qualify								4	2	0	2	10	21
(China) 2007	Did not qualify								3	2	0	1	7	8
(Germany) 2011	Did not qualify								5	4	0	1	9	12
(Canada) 2015	Did not qualify								3	2	0	1	7	4
(France) 2019	Did not qualify								4	3	0	1	14	3
(Australia) (New Zealand) 2023	Did not qualify								6	4	1	1	13	8
(Brazil) 2027	To be determined								To be determined					
(Costa Rica) (Jamaica) (Mexico) (United States) 2031	To be determined								To be determined					
(United Kingdom) 2035	To be determined								To be determined					
Total	–	–	–	–	–	–	–	–	32	14	1	16	63	130

=== Olympic Games ===
Summer Olympics									Qualification					
Year	Result	Position	Pld	W	D	L	GF	GA	Pld	W	D	L	GF	GA
(United States) 1996	Did not enter													
(Australia) 2000	Did not enter													
(Greece) 2004	Did not qualify								2	1	0	1	2	10
(China) 2008	Did not qualify								7	5	0	2	22	5
(United Kingdom) 2012	Did not qualify								6	4	0	2	22	18
(Brazil) 2016	Did not qualify								5	4	0	1	12	8
(Japan) 2020	Did not qualify								2018 Nations Cup					
(France) 2024	Did not qualify								3	1	1	1	13	5
Total	–	–	–	–	–	–	–	–	23	15	1	7	71	46

=== OFC Women's Nations Cup ===
OFC Women's Nations Cup
Year	Result	Position	Pld	W	D	L	GF	GA	GD
(New Caledonia) 1983	did not enter								
(New Zealand) 1986	did not enter								
(Australia) 1989	Fifth place	5th	4	0	0	4	1	19	−18
(Australia) 1991	Third place	3rd	4	0	0	4	0	47	−47
(Papua New Guinea) 1994	Third place	3rd	4	0	0	4	0	19	−19
(New Zealand) 1998	Third place	3rd	4	2	0	2	16	14	+2
(Australia) 2003	Third place	3rd	4	2	0	2	10	21	−11
(Papua New Guinea) 2007	Runners-up	2nd	3	2	0	1	7	8	−1
(New Zealand) 2010	Runners-up	2nd	5	4	0	1	9	12	−3
(Papua New Guinea) 2014	Runners-up	2nd	3	2	0	1	7	4	+3
(New Caledonia) 2018	Third place	3rd	5	4	0	1	22	9	+13
(Fiji) 2022	Champions	1st	5	4	1	0	13	6	+7
(Fiji) 2025	TBD								
Total	Champions	10/12	41	20	1	20	85	159	–74

=== Pacific Games ===
Pacific Games
Year	Result	Position	Pld	W	D	L	GF	GA	GD
(Fiji) 2003	Champions	1st	6	4	1	1	22	6	+16
(Samoa) 2007	Champions	1st	6	5	0	1	22	3	+19
(New Caledonia) 2011	Champions	1st	6	5	0	1	17	3	+14
(Papua New Guinea) 2015	Champions	1st	4	4	0	0	11	1	+10
(Samoa) 2019	Champions	1st	5	5	0	0	23	5	+18
(Solomon Islands) 2023	Champions	1st	5	4	1	0	23	4	+19
(French Polynesia) 2027	TBD								
Total	Champions	6/6	32	27	2	3	118	22	+96

=== Pacific Cup ===
Pacific Cup
Year	Result	Position	Pld	W	D	L	GF	GA	GD
(Tonga) 1996	Champions	1st	Unknown details						
Total	Champions	1/1	–	–	–	–	–	–	–

=== Arafura Games ===
Arafura Games
Year	Result	Position	Pld	W	D	L	GF	GA	GD
(Australia) 2005	Fifth Place	5th	4	0	0	4	2	20	−18
Total	Fifth Place	1/1	4	0	0	4	2	20	–18

== See also ==
- Sport in Papua New Guinea
  - Soccer in Papua New Guinea
- Papua New Guinea women's national under-20 soccer team
- Papua New Guinea women's national under-17 soccer team
- Papua New Guinea national soccer team
