= Football at the 2016 Summer Olympics – Women's qualification =

Twelve teams competed in the women's football tournament at the 2016 Summer Olympics. In addition to Brazil's host nation, 11 women's national teams were qualified from six continental confederations.

== Table ==
In addition to Brazil's host nation, 11 women's national teams were qualified from six continental confederations. FIFA ratified the distribution of spots at the executive committee meeting in March 2014.

| Means of qualification | Dates^{4} | Venue^{4} | Berths | Qualified |
|---|---|---|---|---|
| Host country | 2 October 2009 | Denmark | 1 | Brazil |
| 2014 Copa América | 11–28 September 2014 | Ecuador | 1 | Colombia |
| 2015 FIFA World Cup (for UEFA eligible teams)^{5} | 6 June – 5 July 2015 | Canada | 2 | Germany |
| 2015 FIFA World Cup (for UEFA eligible teams)^{5} | 6 June – 5 July 2015 | Canada | 2 | France |
| 2015 CAF Olympic Qualifying Tournament | 2–18 October 2015 | Various (home and away) | 2 | South Africa |
| 2015 CAF Olympic Qualifying Tournament | 2–18 October 2015 | Various (home and away) | 2 | Zimbabwe^{6} |
| 2016 OFC Olympic Qualifying Tournament | 23 January 2016 | Papua New Guinea | 1 | New Zealand |
| 2016 CONCACAF Olympic Qualifying Championship | 10–21 February 2016 | United States | 2 | United States |
| 2016 CONCACAF Olympic Qualifying Championship | 10–21 February 2016 | United States | 2 | Canada |
| 2016 AFC Olympic Qualifying Tournament | 29 February – 9 March 2016 | Japan | 2 | Australia |
| 2016 AFC Olympic Qualifying Tournament | 29 February – 9 March 2016 | Japan | 2 | China |
| 2016 UEFA Olympic Qualifying Tournament | 2–9 March 2016 | Netherlands | 1 | Sweden |
| Total | | | 12 | |

- ^4 The dates and venues are those of the final tournaments (or final round of the qualification tournaments), various qualification stages may precede matches at these specific venues.
- ^5 England finished in the top three among UEFA teams in the World Cup, however England is not an IOC member and talks for them to compete as Great Britain broke down.
- ^6 Nations making their Olympic tournament debut

== AFC ==
Australia and China PR earned Olympic qualification places by finishing in the top two of the standings of the final round.

=== First round ===
Group A

| Pos | Team | Pld | Pts |
|---|---|---|---|
| 1 | Myanmar (H) | 2 | 6 |
| 2 | India | 2 | 3 |
| 3 | Sri Lanka | 2 | 0 |
| 4 | Bahrain | 0 | 0 |

Source: AFC
(H) Hosts
Group B

| Pos | Team | Pld | Pts |
|---|---|---|---|
| 1 | Jordan (H) | 3 | 9 |
| 2 | Uzbekistan | 3 | 6 |
| 3 | Hong Kong | 3 | 1 |
| 4 | Palestine | 3 | 1 |

Source: AFC
(H) Hosts
Group C

| Pos | Team | Pld | Pts |
|---|---|---|---|
| 1 | Chinese Taipei (H) | 2 | 6 |
| 2 | Iran | 2 | 3 |
| 3 | Laos | 2 | 0 |

Source: AFC
(H) Hosts

=== Second round ===
| Pos | Team | Pld | Pts |
|---|---|---|---|
| 1 | Vietnam | 4 | 9 |
| 2 | Chinese Taipei | 4 | 7 |
| 3 | Thailand | 4 | 7 |
| 4 | Myanmar (H) | 4 | 6 |
| 5 | Jordan | 4 | 0 |

Source: AFC
(H) Hosts

=== Final round ===
| Pos | Team | Pld | Pts |
|---|---|---|---|
| 1 | Australia | 5 | 13 |
| 2 | China | 5 | 11 |
| 3 | Japan (H) | 5 | 7 |
| 4 | South Korea | 5 | 5 |
| 5 | North Korea | 5 | 5 |
| 6 | Vietnam | 5 | 0 |

Source: AFC
(H) Hosts

== CAF ==
South Africa and Zimbabwe earned Olympic qualification places by winning their fourth-round ties.

=== First round ===
| Team 1 | Agg. | Team 2 | 1st leg | 2nd leg |
|---|---|---|---|---|
| Guinea-Bissau | w/o | Liberia | — | — |
| Gabon | w/o | Libya | — | — |

=== Second round ===
| Team 1 | Agg. | Team 2 | 1st leg | 2nd leg |
|---|---|---|---|---|
| Liberia | w/o | Cameroon | — | — |
| Egypt | 1–4 | Ghana | 1–1 | 0–3 |
| Ivory Coast | w/o | Tunisia | — | — |
| Zambia | 2–2 (a) | Zimbabwe | 2–1 | 0–1 |
| Gabon | 2–8 | South Africa | 2–3 | 0–5 |
| Botswana | 2–2 (a) | Kenya | 2–1 | 0–1 |
| Nigeria | w/o | Mali | — | — |
| Congo | 0–7 | Equatorial Guinea | 0–3 | 0–4 |

=== Third round ===
| Team 1 | Agg. | Team 2 | 1st leg | 2nd leg |
|---|---|---|---|---|
| Cameroon | 3–3 (a) | Ghana | 1–1 | 2–2 |
| Ivory Coast | w/o | Zimbabwe | 3–0 (awd.) | — |
| South Africa | 2–0 | Kenya | 1–0 | 1–0 |
| Nigeria | 2–3 | Equatorial Guinea | 1–1 | 1–2 (a.e.t.) |

=== Fourth round ===
| Team 1 | Agg. | Team 2 | 1st leg | 2nd leg |
|---|---|---|---|---|
| Cameroon | 2–2 (a) | Zimbabwe | 2–1 | 0–1 |
| South Africa | 1–0 | Equatorial Guinea | 0–0 | 1–0 |

== CONCACAF ==
The United States and Canada earned Olympic qualification places by winning their semi-final matches.

=== Preliminary round ===
==== Caribbean Zone ====
===== First round =====
Group 1
Group 2

| Pos | Team | Pld | Pts |
|---|---|---|---|
| 1 | Puerto Rico (H) | 3 | 9 |
| 2 | Haiti | 3 | 6 |
| 3 | Grenada | 3 | 3 |
| 4 | Aruba | 3 | 0 |

Source: CFU
(H) Hosts

| Pos | Team | Pld | Pts |
|---|---|---|---|
| 1 | Trinidad and Tobago (H) | 2 | 6 |
| 2 | Saint Lucia | 2 | 0 |
| 3 | Antigua and Barbuda | 0 | 0 |
| 3 | Cayman Islands | 0 | 0 |

Source: CFU
(H) Hosts
Group 3
Group 4

| Pos | Team | Pld | Pts |
|---|---|---|---|
| 1 | Jamaica | 2 | 6 |
| 2 | Dominican Republic (H) | 2 | 3 |
| 3 | Dominica | 2 | 0 |
| 4 | Suriname | 0 | 0 |

Source: CFU
(H) Hosts

| Pos | Team | Pld | Pts |
|---|---|---|---|
| 1 | Guyana | 2 | 4 |
| 2 | Cuba | 2 | 4 |
| 3 | Saint Kitts and Nevis | 2 | 0 |

Source: CFU

===== Final round =====
Semi-finals
18 November – Couva
Puerto Rico (a.e.t.) | 1
Guyana | 0
18 November – Couva
Trinidad and Tobago (a.e.t.) | 2
Jamaica | 1

Final
20 November – Couva
Puerto Rico | 0
Trinidad and Tobago | 1
Third place play-off
20 November – Couva
Guyana | 2
Jamaica | 1

==== Central American Zone ====
| Pos | Team | Pld | Pts |
|---|---|---|---|
| 1 | Costa Rica | 3 | 9 |
| 2 | Guatemala | 3 | 6 |
| 3 | El Salvador | 3 | 3 |
| 4 | Nicaragua (H) | 3 | 0 |
| 5 | Honduras | 0 | 0 |

Source: UNCAF
(H) Hosts

=== Group stage ===
Group A

| Pos | Team | Pld | Pts |
|---|---|---|---|
| 1 | United States (H) | 3 | 9 |
| 2 | Costa Rica | 3 | 6 |
| 3 | Mexico | 3 | 3 |
| 4 | Puerto Rico | 3 | 0 |

Source: CONCACAF
(H) Hosts
Group B

| Pos | Team | Pld | Pts |
|---|---|---|---|
| 1 | Canada | 3 | 9 |
| 2 | Trinidad and Tobago | 3 | 6 |
| 3 | Guyana | 3 | 3 |
| 4 | Guatemala | 3 | 0 |

Source: CONCACAF

=== Knockout stage ===
Semi-finals
19 February – Houston
Canada | 3
Costa Rica | 1
19 February – Houston
United States | 5
Trinidad and Tobago | 0

Final
21 February – Houston
Canada | 0
United States | 2

== CONMEBOL ==
Colombia earned an Olympic qualification place by finishing second in the Copa América Femenina. Brazil automatically qualified as the Olympic host.

=== First stage ===
Group A

| Pos | Team | Pld | Pts |
|---|---|---|---|
| 1 | Colombia | 4 | 12 |
| 2 | Ecuador (H) | 4 | 6 |
| 3 | Uruguay | 4 | 6 |
| 4 | Venezuela | 4 | 4 |
| 5 | Peru | 4 | 1 |

Source: CONMEBOL
(H) Hosts
Group B

| Pos | Team | Pld | Pts |
|---|---|---|---|
| 1 | Brazil | 4 | 9 |
| 2 | Argentina | 4 | 9 |
| 3 | Paraguay | 4 | 6 |
| 4 | Chile | 4 | 6 |
| 5 | Bolivia | 4 | 0 |

Source: CONMEBOL

=== Final stage ===
| Pos | Team | Pld | Pts |
|---|---|---|---|
| 1 | Brazil | 3 | 7 |
| 2 | Colombia | 3 | 5 |
| 3 | Ecuador (H) | 3 | 3 |
| 4 | Argentina | 3 | 1 |

Source: CONMEBOL
(H) Hosts

== OFC ==
New Zealand earned an Olympic qualification place by winning their second round tie.

=== First stage ===
==== Group stage ====
Group A

| Pos | Team | Pld | Pts |
|---|---|---|---|
| 1 | New Caledonia | 3 | 7 |
| 2 | Samoa | 3 | 7 |
| 3 | Tonga | 3 | 3 |
| 4 | Solomon Islands | 3 | 0 |

Source: OFC
Group B

| Pos | Team | Pld | Pts |
|---|---|---|---|
| 1 | Papua New Guinea (H) | 2 | 6 |
| 2 | Cook Islands | 2 | 1 |
| 3 | Fiji | 2 | 1 |

Source: OFC
(H) Hosts

==== Knockout stage ====
Semi-finals
13 July – Port Moresby
New Caledonia | 5
Cook Islands | 1
13 July – Port Moresby
Papua New Guinea | 3
Samoa | 0

Gold medal match
16 July – Port Moresby
New Caledonia | 0
Papua New Guinea | 1
Bronze medal match
16 July – Port Moresby
Cook Islands | 2
Samoa | 0

=== Second stage ===
| Team 1 | Agg. | Team 2 | 1st leg | 2nd leg |
|---|---|---|---|---|
| Papua New Guinea | 1–7 | New Zealand | 1–7 | Canc. |

== UEFA ==
Similar to the qualification process for previous Olympics, UEFA used the FIFA Women's World Cup to determine which women's national teams from Europe qualify for the Olympic football tournament. The three teams from UEFA that progressed the furthest in the 2015 FIFA Women's World Cup played in Canada, other than ineligible England, would qualify for the 2016 Summer Olympics women's football tournament in Brazil. If teams in contention for the Olympic spots were eliminated in the same round, ties would not be broken by their overall tournament record, and play-offs or a mini-tournament to decide the spots would be held provisionally in February/March 2016.

England was ineligible for the Olympics as it was not an Olympic nation, although Great Britain did compete in 2012 as the host nation. The Football Association had originally declared on 2 March 2015 its intention to enter and run teams on behalf of the British Olympic Association at the 2016 Olympics should England qualify. Following strong objections from the Scottish, Welsh and Northern Irish football associations, and a commitment from FIFA that they would not allow entry of a British team unless all four Home Nations agreed, the Football Association announced on 30 March 2015 that they would not seek entry into the Olympic tournament.

After England eliminated Norway in the round of 16 on 22 June 2015, it was confirmed that two of the three spots would go to quarter-finalists France and Germany because there could not be more than three eligible European teams in the quarter-finals. Eventually, no other eligible European team reached the quarter-finals, so the four teams eliminated in the round of 16 (Netherlands, Norway, Sweden and Switzerland) would compete in the UEFA play-off tournament to decide the last spot.

Sweden earned UEFA's last Olympic qualification place by winning the qualifying tournament.

=== FIFA Women's World Cup ===
UEFA teams qualified for 2015 FIFA Women's World Cup
| Team | Final result in 2015 FIFA Women's World Cup | Qualification for 2016 Summer Olympics |
|---|---|---|
| England | Third place | Ineligible |
| Germany | Fourth place | Qualified |
| France | Eliminated in quarter-finals | Qualified |
| Netherlands | Eliminated in round of 16 | Play-off tournament |
| Norway | Eliminated in round of 16 | Play-off tournament |
| Sweden | Eliminated in round of 16 | Play-off tournament |
| Switzerland | Eliminated in round of 16 | Play-off tournament |
| Spain | Eliminated in group stage | |

=== Olympic qualifying tournament ===
| Pos | Team | Pld | Pts |
|---|---|---|---|
| 1 | Sweden | 3 | 7 |
| 2 | Netherlands (H) | 3 | 4 |
| 3 | Switzerland | 3 | 3 |
| 4 | Norway | 3 | 3 |

Source: UEFA
(H) Hosts
