= 2008 OFC Women's Olympic Qualifying Tournament =

The second OFC Women's Olympic Qualifying Tournament in 2008 determined the Oceania Football Confederation's berth for the 2008 Beijing Olympic football tournament.

== First stage ==
Nine women's teams participated in the first stage, held as the 2007 South Pacific Games in Apia, Samoa. from August 25 to September 7. The winning team, Papua New Guinea, progressed to the second round to play New Zealand.

=== Participating teams ===
- American Samoa
- Cook Islands
- Fiji
- New Caledonia
- Papua New Guinea
- Samoa
- Solomon Islands
- Tahiti
- Tonga

== Second stage ==
The second stage was a play-off between New Zealand and the stage 1 winner. It was apparently planned as a two match play-off, but was eventually played over just one game.

New Zealand won the match 2–0 and progressed to the Beijing Olympics.

March 8, 2008

Papua New Guinea	0–2	New Zealand
		Renee Leota 55'; Kirsty Yallop 81'
