= 2018 OFC Women's Nations Cup qualification =

Tournament details
- Host country: Fiji
- City: Lautoka
- Dates: 24–30 August 2018
- Teams: 4
- Venue(s): 1 (in 1 host city)

Final positions
- Champions: Fiji
- Runners-up: Vanuatu
- Third place: Solomon Islands
- Fourth place: American Samoa

Tournament statistics
- Matches played: 6
- Goals scored: 12 (2 per match)
- Attendance: 2,100 (350 per match)
- Top scorer(s): (Fiji) Trina Davis (4 goals)

The 2018 OFC Women's Nations Cup qualification tournament was a football competition that took place from 24 to 30 August 2018 in Lautoka, Fiji to determine the final women's national team which joined the seven automatically qualified teams in the 2018 OFC Women's Nations Cup final tournament in New Caledonia.

== Teams ==
On 31 October 2017, the OFC announced its executive's decision on the teams to compete in the tournament. For the first time, the OFC Women's Nations Cup is a compulsory tournament, so all 11 OFC member national teams entered the tournament. The four lowest-ranked teams, based on previous regional performances of all women's national teams, entered the qualification tournament while the remaining teams were given a bye to the final tournament.

Automatic qualification to the final tournament		Teams entered in qualification
Cook Islands; New Caledonia; New Zealand; Papua New Guinea	Samoa; Tahiti; Tonga	American Samoa; Fiji; Solomon Islands; Vanuatu

== Format ==
The four lowest-ranked teams based on previous regional performances of all women's national teams (American Samoa, Solomon Islands, Vanuatu, and Fiji) entered the qualification tournament, which was played in a single round-robin format in Fiji.

The winner advanced to the 2018 OFC Women's Nations Cup, held from 18 November to 1 December 2018 in New Caledonia, joining the other seven teams which received a bye into the group stage. The Nations Cup serves as the Oceanian qualifiers to the 2019 FIFA Women's World Cup, with the champions qualifying for the final tournament in France, as well as the 2020 Summer Olympics women's football tournament in Japan, as long as they are a member of the International Olympic Committee (IOC).

Each team can name a maximum of 20 players.

=== Tiebreakers ===
The ranking of teams is determined as follows:

1. Points obtained in all qualifying matches;
2. Goal difference in all qualifying matches;
3. Number of goals scored in all qualifying matches;
4. Points obtained in the matches played between the teams in question;
5. Goal difference in the matches played between the teams in question;
6. Number of goals scored in the matches played between the teams in question;
7. Fair play points in all qualifying matches (only one deduction can be applied to a player in a single match):
  - Yellow card: –1 points;
  - Indirect red card (second yellow card): –3 points;
  - Direct red card: –4 points;
  - Yellow card and direct red card: –5 points;
8. Coin toss or drawing of lots.

== Draw ==
The draw for the qualification tournament was held on 21 March 2018 at the OFC Headquarters in Auckland, New Zealand. The hosts Fiji were assigned to position 1 and were exempted from the draw, while the remaining teams were drawn into the other positions without any seeding in order to determine the match schedule.

Pot A (Note: Hosts Fiji were automatically assigned to position 1.)
Team
American Samoa
Solomon Islands
Vanuatu

The draw for the match schedule resulted in the following positions:

Note: Bolded team qualified for the 2018 OFC Women's Nations Cup.

Pos	Team
1	**Fiji**
2	American Samoa
3	Solomon Islands
4	Vanuatu

== Venue ==
The qualification tournament was held at Churchill Park in Lautoka, Fiji. The tournament was originally scheduled to be held in Pago Pago, American Samoa from 27 August to 4 September 2018, but in March 2018 the venue was changed to Fiji. The qualification tournament in Fiji was originally scheduled to take place from 25 to 31 August 2018, but was later adjusted to 24–30 August.

Lautoka	Lautoka is located in Fiji
Churchill Park	Lautoka is located in Fiji
Capacity: **18,000**	Lautoka is located in Fiji

== Schedule ==
The match schedule was revealed on 6 July 2018. The schedule of qualification is as follows:

Matchday	Date	Matches
Matchday 1	24 August 2018	4 v 1, 2 v 3
Matchday 2	27 August 2018	1 v 3, 4 v 2
Matchday 3	30 August 2018	1 v 2, 3 v 4

== Standings ==
Pos	Team	Pld	W	D	L	GF	GA	GD	Pts	Qualification
1	Fiji (H)	3	2	1	0	7	1	+6	**7**	Qualified for the final tournament
2	Vanuatu	3	2	0	1	3	5	−2	**6**	
3	Solomon Islands	3	1	1	1	2	1	+1	**4**	
4	American Samoa	3	0	0	3	0	5	−5	**0**	

Source: OFC
(H) Hosts

== Matches ==
All times are local, FJT (UTC+12).

24 August 2018
12:00

American Samoa	0–2	Solomon Islands
	Report	Samani 39', 90+4'

Churchill Park, Lautoka
Attendance: 100
Referee: Beth Rattray (New Zealand)
24 August 2018
15:00

Vanuatu	1–5	Fiji
Gere 75'	Report	Tamanitoakula 6'; Davis 41', 54', 55'; Nasau 57'

Churchill Park, Lautoka
Attendance: 300
Referee: Tapaita Lelenga (Tonga)

27 August 2018
12:00

Vanuatu	1–0	American Samoa
Wakeret 44'	Report

Churchill Park, Lautoka
Attendance: 100
Referee: Roger Adams (Papua New Guinea)
27 August 2018
15:00

Fiji	0–0	Solomon Islands
	Report

Churchill Park, Lautoka
Attendance: 1,000
Referee: Sione Lelenga (Tonga)

30 August 2018
12:00

Solomon Islands	0–1	Vanuatu
	Report	Solomon 5'

Churchill Park, Lautoka
Attendance: 100
Referee: Tapaita Lelenga (Tonga)
30 August 2018
15:00

Fiji	2–0	American Samoa
Davis 40'; Nasau 45'	Report

Churchill Park, Lautoka
Attendance: 500
Referee: Beth Rattray (New Zealand)

== Goalscorers ==
There were 12 goals scored in 6 matches, for an average of 2 goals per match.

4 goals

- (Fiji) Trina Davis

2 goals

- (Fiji) Cema Nasau
- (Solomon Islands) Laydah Samani

1 goal

- (Fiji) Luisa Tamanitoakula
- (Vanuatu) Annie Gere
- (Vanuatu) Leisale Solomon
- (Vanuatu) Melissa Wakeret

== Qualified teams ==
The following eight teams qualified for the final tournament.

Team	Qualified as	Qualified on	Previous appearances in the OFC Women's Nations Cup (Note: Bold indicates champions for that year. Italic indicates hosts for that year.)
Cook Islands	Automatic	31 October 2017	3 (2003, 2010, 2014)
New Caledonia	Automatic	31 October 2017	1 (1983)
New Zealand	Automatic	31 October 2017	10 (**1983**, 1986, 1989, **1991**, 1994, 1998, 2003, **2007**, **2010**, **2014**)
Papua New Guinea	Automatic	31 October 2017	8 (1989, 1991, 1994, 1998, 2003, 2007, 2010, 2014)
Samoa	Automatic	31 October 2017	2 (1998, 2003)
Tahiti	Automatic	31 October 2017	1 (2010)
Tonga	Automatic	31 October 2017	3 (2007, 2010, 2014)
Fiji	Qualification winners	30 August 2018	3 (1983, 1998, 2010)
