= Meagen Gunemba =

Papua New Guinean footballer

Personal information
- Date of birth: 4 June 1995 (age 31)
- Position: Forward

Team information
- Current team: Lae FC

Senior career*
| Years | Team | Apps | (Gls) |
- Lae FC

International career
| 2019– | Papua New Guinea | 22 | (28) |
- * Club domestic league appearances and goals

Meagen Gunemba (born 4 June 1995) is a Papua New Guinean women's international footballer who plays as a forward for Lae FC. She is co-captain of the Papua New Guinea women's national team, together with Yvonne Gabong.

She was originally omitted from the squad for the 2022 OFC Women's Nations Cup, but was recalled after a public outcry.

== International goals ==
| No. | Date | Venue | Opponent | Score | Result | Competition |
|---|---|---|---|---|---|---|
| 1. | 25 October 2014 | Kalabond Oval, Kokopo, Papua New Guinea | Cook Islands | 2–0 | 4–1 | 2014 OFC Women's Nations Cup |
| 2. | 25 October 2014 | Kalabond Oval, Kokopo, Papua New Guinea | Cook Islands | 3–0 | 4–1 | 2014 OFC Women's Nations Cup |
| 3. | 25 October 2014 | Kalabond Oval, Kokopo, Papua New Guinea | Cook Islands | 4–0 | 4–1 | 2014 OFC Women's Nations Cup |
| 4. | 29 October 2014 | Kalabond Oval, Kokopo, Papua New Guinea | Tonga | 1–0 | 3–0 | 2014 OFC Women's Nations Cup |
| 5. | 6 July 2015 | Bisini Sports Complex, Port Moresby, Papua New Guinea | Fiji | 1–0 | 5–1 | 2015 Pacific Games |
| 6. | 6 July 2015 | Bisini Sports Complex, Port Moresby, Papua New Guinea | Fiji | 2–0 | 5–1 | 2015 Pacific Games |
| 7. | 6 July 2015 | Bisini Sports Complex, Port Moresby, Papua New Guinea | Fiji | 3–0 | 5–1 | 2015 Pacific Games |
| 8. | 11 July 2015 | Bisini Sports Complex, Port Moresby, Papua New Guinea | Cook Islands | 1–0 | 2–0 | 2015 Pacific Games |
| 9. | 13 July 2015 | Bisini Sports Complex, Port Moresby, Papua New Guinea | Samoa | 2–0 | 3–0 | 2015 Pacific Games |
| 10. | 23 January 2016 | PNGFA Academy, Lae, Papua New Guinea | New Zealand | 1–7 | 1–7 | 2016 OFC Women's Olympic Qualifying Tournament |
| 11. | 18 November 2018 | Stade Yoshida, Koné, New Caledonia | Samoa | 1–0 | 5–0 | 2018 OFC Women's Nations Cup |
| 12. | 18 November 2018 | Stade Yoshida, Koné, New Caledonia | Samoa | 2–0 | 5–0 | 2018 OFC Women's Nations Cup |
| 13. | 18 November 2018 | Stade Yoshida, Koné, New Caledonia | Samoa | 4–0 | 5–0 | 2018 OFC Women's Nations Cup |
| 14. | 28 November 2018 | Stade de la Roche, Maré, New Caledonia | Fiji | 1–0 | 1–5 | 2018 OFC Women's Nations Cup |
| 15. | 1 December 2018 | Stade Numa-Daly Magenta, Nouméa, New Caledonia | New Caledonia | 1–0 | 7–1 | 2018 OFC Women's Nations Cup |
| 16. | 1 December 2018 | Stade Numa-Daly Magenta, Nouméa, New Caledonia | New Caledonia | 2–0 | 7–1 | 2018 OFC Women's Nations Cup |
| 17. | 1 December 2018 | Stade Numa-Daly Magenta, Nouméa, New Caledonia | New Caledonia | 5–0 | 7–1 | 2018 OFC Women's Nations Cup |
| 18. | 1 December 2018 | Stade Numa-Daly Magenta, Nouméa, New Caledonia | New Caledonia | 6–1 | 7–1 | 2018 OFC Women's Nations Cup |
| 19. | 8 July 2019 | National Soccer Stadium, Apia, Samoa | Solomon Islands | 4–1 | 5–2 | 2019 Pacific Games |
| 20. | 12 July 2019 | National Soccer Stadium, Apia, Samoa | Tahiti | 1–0 | 4–0 | 2019 Pacific Games |
| 21. | 18 July 2019 | National Soccer Stadium, Apia, Samoa | Cook Islands | 1–0 | 5–1 | 2019 Pacific Games |
| 22. | 18 July 2019 | National Soccer Stadium, Apia, Samoa | Cook Islands | 3–1 | 5–1 | 2019 Pacific Games |
| 23. | 18 July 2019 | National Soccer Stadium, Apia, Samoa | Cook Islands | 5–1 | 5–1 | 2019 Pacific Games |
| 24. | 17 July 2022 | ANZ Stadium, Suva, Fiji | Tahiti | 2–0 | 2–1 | 2022 OFC Women's Nations Cup |
| 25. | 23 July 2022 | ANZ Stadium, Suva, Fiji | Tonga | 2–2 | 3–3 (a.e.t.) (3–2 p) | 2022 OFC Women's Nations Cup |
| 26. | 27 July 2022 | ANZ Stadium, Suva, Fiji | Samoa | 2–0 | 3–0 | 2022 OFC Women's Nations Cup |
| 27. | 27 July 2022 | ANZ Stadium, Suva, Fiji | Samoa | 3–0 | 3–0 | 2022 OFC Women's Nations Cup |
| 28. | 30 July 2022 | ANZ Stadium, Suva, Fiji | Fiji | 1–0 | 2–1 | 2022 OFC Women's Nations Cup |
| 29. | 5 March 2026 | Govind Park, Ba, Fiji | New Caledonia | 3–0 | 4–0 | 2027 FIFA Women's World Cup qualification |
| 30. | 8 March 2026 | Govind Park, Ba, Fiji | Fiji | 1–0 | 1–0 | 2027 FIFA Women's World Cup qualification |
| 31. | 29 September 2026 | HFC Bank Stadium, Suva, Fiji | Solomon Islands | 4–0 | 5–1 | 2026 MSG Prime Minister's Cup |
| 32. | 29 September 2026 | HFC Bank Stadium, Suva, Fiji | Solomon Islands | 5–1 | 5–1 | 2026 MSG Prime Minister's Cup |

== See also ==
- Raymond Gunemba
