= Lucy Maino =

Papua New Guinean footballer

Personal information
- Full name: Lucy Philomena Maino
- Date of birth: 2 August 1995 (age 31)
- Place of birth: Port Moresby, Papua New Guinea
- Height: 1.70 m (5 ft 7 in)
- Position: Right back

Youth career
- Heritage Christian HS

College career
Years	Team	Apps	(Gls)
2014–2015	College of the Canyons Cougars	41	(1)
2017–2018	Hawaii–Hilo Vulcans	33	(3)

International career^{‡}
2015–	Papua New Guinea	4	(2)
Medal record
Women's soccer
Representing Papua New Guinea
Pacific Games
Gold medal – first place	2015 Port Moresby	Team
Gold medal – first place	2019 Apia	Team
OFC Nations Cup
Winner	2022 Fiji
- ‡ National team caps and goals as of 30 July 2022

Lucy Philomena Maino (born 2 August 1995) is a Papua New Guinean footballer and beauty pageant titleholder who was crowned Miss Papua New Guinea 2019. She is a two-time Pacific Games gold medalist as part of the Papua New Guinean women's national football team.

== Education ==
Lucy Maino is an alumna of the University of Hawaiʻi at Hilo (UH Hilo) in Hilo, Hawaiʻi. She majored in business administration graduating in 2019.

== Junior football ==
=== Youth ===
Maino attended and played for the Heritage Christian School in North Hills, graduating in 2014.

=== College ===
In 2014–15, she attended the College of the Canyons (COC), a public community college, in Santa Clarita, California. She appeared in 40 of her teams' 41 matches over two seasons (2014 and 2015). She starred in her teams win-draw-loss record of 29-4-8 during that time and won two conference championships. They were ranked number 13 in the national junior college poll in 2015.

=== NCAA ===
From 2016–18, she attended the University of Hawaiʻi at Hilo as a recognized NCAA Division II student athlete. She spent the whole of 2016 as a red-shirt for the Hawaii–Hilo Vulcans. On 2 September 2017, she made her debut for the Hawaii–Hilo Vulcans with a 2–0 win over Pace University. She would go on to cap 33 games for the Vulcans in two seasons (2017–18).

== Representative career ==
=== Summer Youth Olympics ===
In 2010, Lucy Maino made her debut appearance in Papua New Guinea colours when she was named to the Papua New Guinea Girls Under-15 football team to the 2010 Summer Youth Olympics in Singapore.

=== Pacific Games ===
In 2015, Maino made her first senior appearance for the Papua New Guinea women's national football team at the Pacific Games in 2015. She played as right back for the national squad as the team went through the tournament undefeated winning gold against New Caledonia by a goal to nil.

In 2019, she made her second Pacific Games team to play in Apia, Samoa. Maino was also named as co-captain of the national squad. During the Games, she scored 2 goals in the pool stages to help the team advance into the play-off for gold. In the gold medal match, Maino and the PNG women's football team successfully defended their title from 2015 this time defeating hosts Samoa, 3–1.

=== OFC Nations Cup ===
In 2022, Maino was part of the historic PNG squad that won the country's first Nations Cup title at the 2022 OFC Women's Nations Cup in Suva, Fiji. She was awarded player of the match after their 2–1 win over Tahiti in the pool stages.

== Pageantry ==
=== Miss Papua New Guinea 2019 ===
On 2 August 2019, Maino was announced as a contestant for the 2019 Miss PNG Pacific Islands pageant. Her launching was sponsored by Paga Hill Estate (a local estate organization in Port Moresby). On 31 August, competing against five other contestants, Maino was crowned the winner by predecessor Leoshina Kariha. Maino also won a majority of the pageants special awards for Miss Tourism, Miss Trends Ambassador, Miss Friendship, Best Traditionally Inspired dress, Best Talent, and Best Sarong wear. The achievement allowed Maino to represent Papua New Guinea at the 2019 Miss Pacific Islands pageant.

=== Miss Pacific Islands 2019 ===
On the 24–30 November 2019, Maino contested the Miss Pacific Islands pageant as Miss Papua New Guinea in her hometown of Port Moresby. During the crowning night on the 30th of November, Maino was selected as one of the pageants top five contestants by the panel of judges. In addition, she won the special award for Best Sarong Wear. By the end of the event, Maino finished third overall after being announced as the second runner-up, finishing behind first runner-up Gladys Habu of Solomon Islands and winner Fonoifafo Nancy McFarland-Seumanu of Samoa.
