= Tony Readings =

English footballer and coach (born 1975)

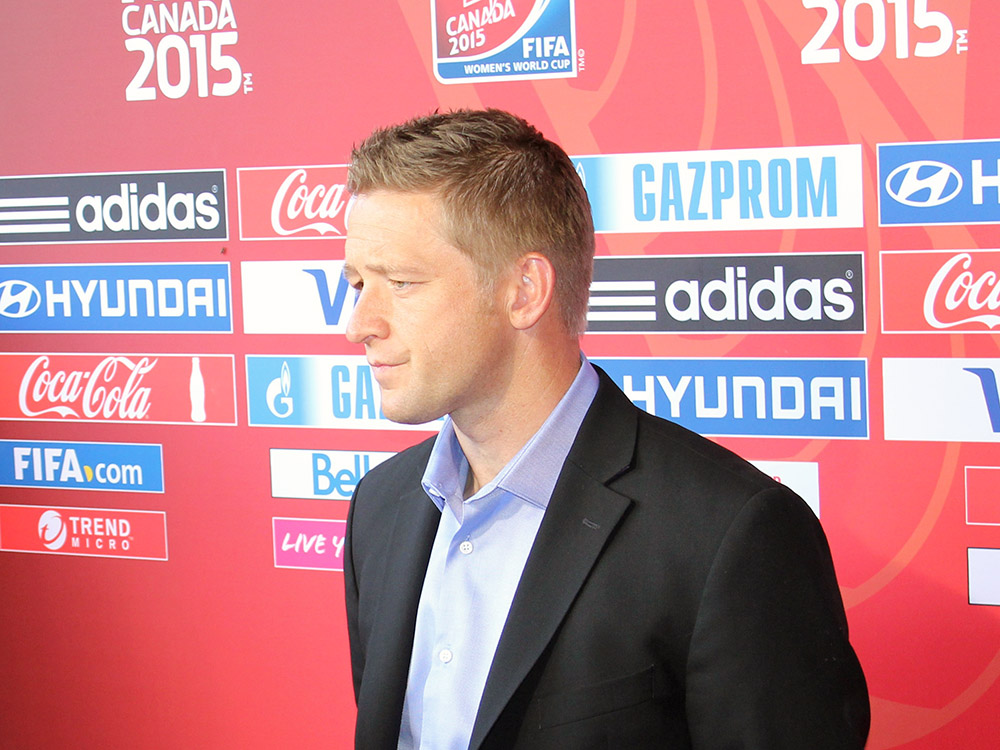
- Tony Readings at the FIFA Women's World Cup Canada 2015

Personal information
- Full name: Anthony David Readings
- Date of birth: 27 October 1975 (age 51)
- Place of birth: London, England
- Position: Defender

Senior career*
Years	Team	Apps	(Gls)
1999–2002	Wembley		
2002–2003	AFC Wimbledon	20	(0)
2003	North Shore United		
2004–2008	Birkenhead United		

Managerial career
- 2004–2007: Northern Football
- 2006–2008: New Zealand U-20 Ladies (assistant)
- 2008–2011: New Zealand Ladies (assistant)
- 2009–2011: New Zealand U-20 Ladies
- 2011–2017: New Zealand Ladies
- 2019–2020: Eastern Suburbs AFC
- 2024: New Zealand (assistant manager)
- * Club domestic league appearances and goals as of 16:20, 12 September 2020 (UTC)

Anthony David Readings (born 27 October 1975) is a pro licence-qualified English football coach, performance specialist and former player who played for AFC Wimbledon and North Shore United. From 2011 to 2017, he was the head coach of the Football Ferns, New Zealand's national women's football team.

He was the longest serving and most successful coach of the New Zealand national women's team, guiding the team to their highest ever FIFA world ranking (16) and to the quarterfinals of the London Olympics. He remans the only person to coach a New Zealand team to the quarterfinals of a senior FIFA event, and has most international victories for a coach of a New Zealand senior team. He also works as a performance consultant, leadership mentor and executive coach.

== Club career ==
After playing semi-professional football for Wembley, Readings attended trials on Wimbledon Common for the new AFC Wimbledon club, set up by fans of Wimbledon F.C. in 2002. He captained the club in its first ever League match; a 2–1 win at Sandhurst Town and went on to make 26 appearances for the club in all competitions. In January 2003 Readings left to pursue a professional career in New Zealand.

== Coaching career ==
From 2009 to 2012, Readings coached the New Zealand women's national under-20 football team, having been promoted to the role after two years as the assistant coach.

During this time, he was also involved in three major campaigns with the Football Ferns, firstly as a technical analyst at the 2007 FIFA Women's World Cup and then as assistant coach at the Beijing Olympics and the 2011 FIFA Women's World Cup.

Following the departure of then coach John Herdman to take charge of the Canadian national women's team in September 2011, Readings was elevated to the head coach role.

At the London Olympics in 2012, Readings guided New Zealand to the quarterfinals after narrow defeats to Great Britain and Brazil and a win over Cameroon in their group. It was the first time a New Zealand team had progressed past the group stage of a senior FIFA event.

In 2013, New Zealand beat Brazil and China to win the 2013 Valais Cup in Switzerland, their first piece of silverware won outside their Oceania Confederation in 38 years. That same year they claimed away draws against reigning world champions Japan and Olympic champions USA and rose to an all-time high of 16th in the FIFA World Rankings, a mark they would reach again in 2015.

New Zealand defended their confederation crown in 2014, winning the OFC Women's Nations Cup which qualified the team for the 2015 FIFA Women's World Cup in Canada where they drew two of their three matches to record the most points by a New Zealand team at a FIFA Women's World Cup.

In October 2015, Readings committed a four-year contract with New Zealand Football, but the 2016 Olympics would prove to be his last campaign in charge as in November 2017, Readings stepped down from his role as head coach of the New Zealand national women's team citing a desire to spend more time with his family. This ended 11 years involvement with the Football Ferns, six of those as head coach.

His 75 internationals in charge is the most for any coach of a New Zealand senior team as is his tally of 22 wins in 'A' internationals.

On October 10, 2019 he was unveiled as Eastern Suburbs' director of football and the coach of the club's men's first team for the New Zealand national league and OFC Champions League.

== Managerial statistics ==
As of 3 November 2017

Team	From	To	Record				
Team	From	To	G	W	D	L	Win %
New Zealand women	September 2011	November 2017	75	22	20	33	29.33

== Honours ==
=== Coach ===
==== International ====
===== New Zealand Women =====
- OFC Women's Nations Cup: 2014
- OFC Women's Olympic Qualifying Tournament: (2) 2012, 2016
- Women's Olympic Football Tournament: Quarterfinals: 2012
- Valais Cup: 2013

===== New Zealand U-20 Women =====
- OFC U-20 Women's Championship: 2012
