= Football at the 2019 Pacific Games – Women's tournament =

2019 Pacific Games women's football tournament
Tournament details
- Host country: Samoa
- City: Apia
- Dates: 8–20 July
- Teams: 10 (from 1 confederation)
- Venue(s): 2 (in 1 host city)

Final positions
- Champions: Papua New Guinea (5th title)
- Runners-up: Samoa
- Third place: Fiji
- Fourth place: Cook Islands

Tournament statistics
- Matches played: 22
- Goals scored: 100 (4.55 per match)
- Top scorer(s): (Papua New Guinea) Ramona Padio (9 goals)

The women's football tournament at the 2019 Pacific Games is being held from 8 to 20 July 2019. It is the 5th edition of the women's Pacific Games football tournament. Together with the men's competition, all matches are being played at the J.S. Blatter Stadium in Apia, Samoa.

== Teams ==
- American Samoa
- Cook Islands
- Fiji
- New Caledonia
- Papua New Guinea
- Samoa
- Solomon Islands
- Tahiti
- Tonga
- Vanuatu

== Venues ==
Apia	Football at the 2019 Pacific Games – Women's tournament is located in Samoa
J.S. Blatter Stadium	Football at the 2019 Pacific Games – Women's tournament is located in Samoa
13°50′12″S 171°45′7″W	Football at the 2019 Pacific Games – Women's tournament is located in Samoa
Capacity: 3,500	Football at the 2019 Pacific Games – Women's tournament is located in Samoa

== Group stage ==
=== Group A ===
Pos	Team	Pld	W	D	L	GF	GA	GD	Pts	Qualification
1	Samoa (H)	4	3	1	0	9	2	+7	10	Gold Final
2	Fiji	4	3	0	1	18	2	+16	9	Bronze Final
3	Tonga	4	2	0	2	16	10	+6	6	
4	New Caledonia	4	1	0	3	13	10	+3	3	
5	American Samoa	4	0	1	3	0	32	−32	1	

Source: Pacific Games
(H) Hosts
8 July 2019
12:00

Fiji	11–0	American Samoa
Tamanitoakula 10', 64'; Nasau 24', 33'; Bakaniceva 39', 67'; Riwai 50'; Senisea 62', 86'; Vaiomounga 82' (o.g.); Tabua 87'	Report

J.S. Blatter Soccer Stadium #2, Apia
Referee: Thein Thein Aye (Myanmar)
8 July 2019
15:00

Samoa	5–0	Tonga
Lyne-Lewis 18', 32'; Daniells 57'; Mamea 65'; Ah Ki 86'	Report

J.S. Blatter Soccer Stadium #2, Apia
Referee: Salesh Chand (Fiji)

10 July 2019
12:00

Tonga	3–2	New Caledonia
Funaki 15', 71'; Kofutu'a 84'	Report	Pahoa 6'; Lalie 23'

J.S. Blatter Soccer Stadium #2, Apia
Referee: Nadia Browning (New Zealand)
10 July 2019
15:00

American Samoa	0–0	Samoa
	Report

J.S. Blatter Soccer Stadium #2, Apia
Referee: Pansa Chaisanit (Thailand)

12 July 2019
13:30

New Caledonia	9–0	American Samoa
Cawa 13', 38', 40'; Haocas 19', 27', 76'; Ajapuhnya 45'; Pahoa 82'; Ihmeling 85'	Report

J.S. Blatter Soccer Stadium #3, Apia
Referee: David Yareboinen (Papua New Guinea)
12 July 2019
15:30

Samoa	1–0	Fiji
Lyne-Lewis 8'	Report

J.S. Blatter Soccer Stadium #3, Apia
Referee: Thoriq Munir Alkatiri (Indonesia)

15 July 2019
13:30

Fiji	4–0	New Caledonia
Riwai 4'; Nasau 39'; Tabua 50'; Bukalidi 90'	Report

J.S. Blatter Soccer Stadium #3, Apia
Referee: Thein Thein Aye (Myanmar)
15 July 2019
15:30

American Samoa	0–12	Tonga
	Report	Funaki 1'; Hakalo 3', 62'; Kofutu'a 34'; Siale 45', 47', 53', 72'; Soakai 65'; Kafa 70', 76', 90'

J.S. Blatter Soccer Stadium #3, Apia
Referee: Nick Waldron (New Zealand)

18 July 2019
12:00

Tonga	1–3	Fiji
Funaki 54'	Report	Nasau 21'; Nainima 45'; Tabua 55'

J.S. Blatter Soccer Stadium #2, Apia
Referee: Pansa Chaisanit (Thailand)
18 July 2019
15:00

New Caledonia	2–3	Samoa
Cawa 7', 15'	Report	Lyne-Lewis 36', 42', 86'

J.S. Blatter Soccer Stadium #2, Apia
Referee: Thein Thein Aye (Myanmar)

=== Group B ===
Pos	Team	Pld	W	D	L	GF	GA	GD	Pts	Qualification
1	Papua New Guinea	4	4	0	0	20	4	+16	12	Gold Final
2	Cook Islands	4	3	0	1	7	7	0	9	Bronze Final
3	Tahiti	4	1	1	2	1	6	−5	4	
4	Solomon Islands	4	1	0	3	5	9	−4	3	
5	Vanuatu	4	0	1	3	3	10	−7	1	

Source: Pacific Games
8 July 2019
13:30

Tahiti	0–2	Cook Islands
	Report	Maoate-Cox 38', 86'

J.S. Blatter Soccer Stadium #3, Apia
Referee: Pansa Chaisanit (Thailand)
8 July 2019
15:30

Papua New Guinea	5–2	Solomon Islands
Maino 21', 79'; Padio 26', 38'; Gunemba 70'	Report	Bakolo 15'; Samani 72'

J.S. Blatter Soccer Stadium #3, Apia
Referee: Nadia Browning (New Zealand)

10 July 2019
13:30

Cook Islands	2–1	Vanuatu
Maoate-Cox 11'; Morris-Ponga 86'	Report	Gere 90'

J.S. Blatter Soccer Stadium #3, Apia
Referee: Thein Thein Aye (Myanmar)
10 July 2019
15:30

Solomon Islands	0–1	Tahiti
	Report	Taumaa 67'

J.S. Blatter Soccer Stadium #3, Apia
Referee: Tapaita Lelenga (Tonga)

12 July 2019
12:00

Vanuatu	1–2	Solomon Islands
Taravaki 69'	Report	Pegi 60'; Bakolo 65'

J.S. Blatter Soccer Stadium #2, Apia
Referee: Salesh Chand (Fiji)
12 July 2019
15:00

Tahiti	0–4	Papua New Guinea
	Report	Gunemba 34'; Unamba 37'; Padio 53', 57'

J.S. Blatter Soccer Stadium #2, Apia
Referee: Tapaita Lelenga (Tonga)

15 July 2019
12:00

Papua New Guinea	6–1	Vanuatu
Kaipu 6', 50'; Unamba 8'; Padio 54', 59', 64'	Report	Alatoa 12'

J.S. Blatter Soccer Stadium #2, Apia
Referee: Pansa Chaisanit (Thailand)
15 July 2019
15:00

Solomon Islands	1–2	Cook Islands
David 36'	Report	Mose 20'; Maoate-Cox 23'

J.S. Blatter Soccer Stadium #2, Apia
Referee: Mongkolchai Pechsri (Thailand)

18 July 2019
13:30

Cook Islands	1–5	Papua New Guinea
Mose 64'	Report	Gunemba 39', 70', 80'; Padio 45'; Gabong 73'

J.S. Blatter Soccer Stadium #3, Apia
Referee: Salesh Chand (Fiji)
18 July 2019
15:30

Vanuatu	0–0	Tahiti
	Report

J.S. Blatter Soccer Stadium #3, Apia
Referee: Thoriq Munir Alkatiri (Indonesia)

== Final stage ==
=== Bronze final ===
20 July 2019
9:00

Fiji	3–1	Cook Islands
Nasau 35', 47'; Tamanitoakula 84'		Maoate-Cox 63'

J.S. Blatter Soccer Stadium #1, Apia
Attendance: 400
Referee: Nadia Browning (New Zealand)

=== Gold final ===
20 July 2019
9:30

Samoa	1–3	Papua New Guinea
Lyne-Lewis 38'		Kaipu 28', 42'; Padio 90+3'

J.S. Blatter Soccer Stadium #2, Apia
Attendance: 1,200
Referee: Pansa Chaisanit (Thailand)

== Goalscorers ==
There were 100 goals scored in 22 matches, for an average of 4.55 goals per match.

9 goals

- (Papua New Guinea) Ramona Padio

7 goals

- (Samoa) Torijan Lyne-Lewis

6 goals

- (Fiji) Cema Nasau

5 goals

- (Cook Islands) Lee Maoate-Cox
- (New Caledonia) Cassidy Cawa
- (Papua New Guinea) Meagen Gunemba

4 goals

- (Papua New Guinea) Marie Kaipu
- (Tonga) Vea Funaki
- (Tonga) Fololeni Siale

3 goals

- (Fiji) Jotivini Tabua
- (New Caledonia) Marielle Haocas
- (Tonga) Mele Kafa

2 goals

- (Cook Islands) Kura Mose
- (Fiji) Viniana Riwai
- (Fiji) Ledua Senisea
- (Fiji) Luisa Tamanitoakula
- (New Caledonia) Jackie Pahoa
- (Papua New Guinea) Lucy Maino
- (Papua New Guinea) Selina Unamba
- (Solomon Islands) Crystal Bakolo
- (Tonga) Florence Hakalo
- (Tonga) Tolini Kofutu'a

1 goal

- (Cook Islands) Paulina Morris-Ponga
- (Fiji) Lora Bukalidi
- (Fiji) Annette Nainima
- (New Caledonia) Ami-Nata Ajapuhnya
- (New Caledonia) Shaya Ihmeling
- (New Caledonia) Aurélie Lalie
- (Papua New Guinea) Yvonne Gabong
- (Samoa) Madeleen Ah Ki
- (Samoa) Matalena Daniells
- (Samoa) Moreva Mamea
- (Solomon Islands) Jemina David
- (Solomon Islands) Ileen Pegi
- (Solomon Islands) Laydah Samani
- (French Polynesia) Hanihei Taumaa
- (Tonga) Mele Soakai
- (Vanuatu) Jane Alatoa
- (Vanuatu) Annie Gere
- (Vanuatu) Emilia Taravaki

1 own goal

- (American Samoa) Olivia Vaiomounga (against Fiji)

== See also ==
- Football at the 2019 Pacific Games – Men's tournament
- Football at the 2019 Pacific Games
- Football at the Pacific Games
