= Football at the 2017 Pacific Mini Games – Women's tournament =

2017 Pacific Mini Games
Tournament details
- Host country: Vanuatu
- Dates: 4–14 December
- Teams: 4 (from 1 confederation)
- Venue: 2 (in 1 host city)

Final positions
- Champions: Vanuatu (1st title)
- Runners-up: Fiji
- Third place: Tonga
- Fourth place: Solomon Islands

Tournament statistics
- Matches played: 8
- Goals scored: 24 (3 per match)
- Top scorer(s): (Fiji) Cema Nasau (4 goals)

The 2017 Women’s Football tournament at the Pacific Mini Games marked an important milestone as the first edition of an international women’s football competition held within this regional multi-sport event. Organized under the authority of the Oceania Football Confederation (OFC), the tournament was designed to provide greater opportunities for female footballers from across the Pacific region to compete at an international level.

Held as part of the broader 2017 Pacific Mini Games, the competition brought together national teams made up of players representing Pacific island nations. These games are known for promoting regional unity and development through sport, and the inclusion of women’s football for the first time reflected a growing commitment to gender equality and the expansion of women’s participation in football across Oceania.

The tournament served multiple purposes. Beyond determining a champion, it acted as a platform for developing talent, raising the standard of women’s football, and increasing visibility for the sport in smaller nations where resources and opportunities can be limited. For many players, it was a rare chance to experience structured international competition, gain exposure, and represent their countries on a regional stage.

Matches were played in a competitive yet celebratory atmosphere, with teams showcasing a mix of emerging talent and experienced players. The format allowed nations to test their abilities, build team cohesion, and learn from different playing styles across the region. It also helped national associations identify areas for improvement and investment in women’s football programs.

Overall, the 2017 edition was a landmark event for women’s football in the Pacific. By establishing a dedicated tournament within the Pacific Mini Games, it laid the foundation for future competitions and contributed to the long-term growth of the sport. The event not only highlighted the passion and potential of female athletes in Oceania but also reinforced the importance of continued support and development for women’s football at all levels.

== Venues ==
The host city is Port Vila.

Venue 1 - Port Vila	Venue 2 - Port Vila
Port Vila Municipal Stadium	Korman Stadium
Capacity:5,000	Capacity:10,000

== Participating teams ==
Four teams participated in the tournament.

- Fiji
- Solomon Islands
- Tonga
- Vanuatu (hosts)

== Officials ==
A total of 6 Referees and 8 Assistants were selected for the tournament.

Referee	Assistants
Robinson Banga (Vanuatu)	Mahit Chilia (Vanuatu)
Salesh Chand (Fiji)	Jeremy Garae (Vanuatu)
Joel Hopken (Vanuatu)	Noah Kusunan (Papua New Guinea)
Nelson Sogo (Solomon Islands)	Stephanie Minan (Papua New Guinea)
George Time (Solomon Islands)	Avinesh Narayan (Fiji)
David Yareboinen (Papua New Guinea)	Hilmon Sese (Vanuatu)
	Stephen Seniga (Solomon Islands)
	Jeffery Solodia (Solomon Islands)

== Group stage ==
Team	Pld	W	D	L	GF	GA	GD	Pts
Fiji	3	2	1	0	7	0	+7	7
Vanuatu	3	1	2	0	7	2	+5	5
Tonga	3	1	1	1	5	8	−3	4
Solomon Islands	3	0	0	3	1	10	−9	0

4 December 2017
9:00 UTC+12

Fiji	5–0	Tonga
Tabua 19'; Nasau 29', 45'; Tamanitoakula 35', 85'	Report

Port Vila Municipal Stadium
Attendance: 500
Referee: Joel Hopkken (Vanuatu)
4 December 2017
12:00 UTC+12

Vanuatu	5–0	Solomon Islands
Willie 26'; Alatoa 51'; Melteviel 71', 76'; Abock 73'	Report

Port Vila Municipal Stadium
Attendance: 2,000
Referee: (Papua New Guinea) David Yareboinen (Papua New Guinea)

7 December 2017
16:00 UTC+12

Solomon Islands	1–3	Tonga
Kwoaetolo 40'	Report	Akolo 29', 52'; Feke 85'

Port Vila Municipal Stadium
Attendance: 2,000
Referee: Salesh Chand (Fiji)
7 December 2017
19:00 UTC+12

Vanuatu	0–0	Fiji
	Report

Port Vila Municipal Stadium
Attendance: 5,000
Referee: (Solomon Islands) Nelson Sogo (Solomon Islands)

11 December 2017
12:00 UTC+12

Fiji	2–0	Solomon Islands
Nasau 50'; Tabua 88'	Report

Port Vila Municipal Stadium
Attendance: 1,000
Referee: Joel Hopkken (Vanuatu)
11 December 2017
19:00 UTC+12

Tonga	2–2	Vanuatu
Siale 5'; Akolo 31'	Report	Alatoa 62'; Willie 68'

Port Vila Municipal Stadium
Attendance: 5,000
Referee: (Solomon Islands) George Time (Solomon Islands)

=== Bronze Medal ===
14 December 2017

Tonga	1–0	Solomon Islands
Soakai 80'	Report

Port Vila Municipal Stadium

=== Gold Medal ===
14 December 2017

Fiji	1–2	Vanuatu
Nasau 85'	Report	Solomon 62'; Ishmael 86'

Port Vila Municipal Stadium

== Goalscorers ==
There were 24 goals scored in 8 matches, for an average of 3 goals per match.

4 goals

- (Fiji) Cema Nasau

3 goals

- (Tonga) Mele Akolo

2 goals

- (Fiji) Jotivini Tabua
- (Fiji) Luisa Tamanitoakula
- (Vanuatu) Jane Alatoa
- (Vanuatu) Monica Melteviel
- (Vanuatu) Pauline Willie

1 goal

- (Solomon Islands) Elsie Kwoaetolo
- (Tonga) Penateti Feke
- (Tonga) Fololeni Siale
- (Tonga) Mele Soakai
- (Vanuatu) Toukawa Abock
- (Vanuatu) Junane Ishmael
- (Vanuatu) Leisale Solomon
