= Football at the 2015 Pacific Games – Women's tournament =

2015 Pacific Games women's football tournament
Tournament details
- Host country: Papua New Guinea
- City: Port Moresby
- Dates: 6–16 July 2015
- Teams: 7 (from 1 confederation)
- Venues: 2 (in 1 host city)

Final positions
- Champions: Papua New Guinea (4th title)
- Runners-up: New Caledonia
- Third place: Cook Islands
- Fourth place: Samoa

Tournament statistics
- Matches played: 13
- Goals scored: 47 (3.62 per match)
- Top scorer: (New Caledonia) Christelle Wahnawe (10 goals)

The 2015 Pacific Games women's football tournament was the fourth edition of the Pacific Games women's football tournament. The women's football tournament was held in Port Moresby, Papua New Guinea between 6–16 July 2015 as part of the 2015 Pacific Games. The tournament was open to full women's national teams (unlike the men's tournament, which was age-restricted).

The tournament also doubled as the first stage of the fourth edition of the OFC Women's Olympic Qualifying Tournament, the quadrennial international tournament organised by the Oceania Football Confederation (OFC) to determine which women's national teams from Oceania qualify for the Olympic football tournament. The highest-ranked team of this competition who is a member of the International Olympic Committee (IOC) advanced to the second stage against New Zealand, where the winner qualifies for the 2016 Summer Olympics women's football tournament.

Papua New Guinea won the gold medal for the fourth consecutive Pacific Games.

== Teams ==
A total of 7 teams participated in the tournament.

Team	Appearance	Previous best performance
Cook Islands	3rd	Group stage (2007, 2011)
Fiji	4th	Bronze medal (2007, 2011)
New Caledonia	3rd	Silver medal (2011)
Papua New Guinea (hosts)	4th	Gold medal (2003, 2007, 2011)
Samoa	2nd	Group stage (2007)
Solomon Islands	3rd	Group stage (2007, 2011)
Tonga	4th	Silver medal (2007)

New Caledonia are ineligible for the Olympics as they are not affiliated to the IOC. Had they won the tournament, the runner-up would advance to the second stage of the OFC Women's Olympic Qualifying Tournament.

== Venues ==
Port Moresby
Bisini Sports Complex	Sir Hubert Murray Stadium
9.471732°S 147.200810°E	9.466323°S 147.156674°E

== Group stage ==
The draw was held on 1 June 2015 at the OFC Headquarters at Auckland. The seven teams were drawn into one group of four teams and one group of three teams.

The top two teams of each group advanced to the semi-finals.

All times UTC+10.

=== Group A ===
Pos	Team	Pld	W	D	L	GF	GA	GD	Pts	Qualification
1	New Caledonia	3	2	1	0	16	3	+13	7	Knockout stage
2	Samoa	3	2	1	0	5	3	+2	7	Knockout stage
3	Tonga	3	1	0	2	2	7	−5	3	
4	Solomon Islands	3	0	0	3	2	12	−10	0	

Source: OFC
6 July 2015
10:30

Solomon Islands	1–8	New Caledonia
Aihunu 67' (pen.)	Report	Wahnawe 6', 48', 68'; Rabah 14'; Xolawawa 39' (pen.); Maguire 73'; Hace 80'; Gatha 90+8'

Bisini Sports Complex, Port Moresby
Referee: Mel Knight (New Zealand)
6 July 2015
12:45

Tonga	0–1	Samoa
	Report	Ioane 57'

Bisini Sports Complex, Port Moresby
Referee: Mairi Noni (Papua New Guinea)

8 July 2015
12:45

Solomon Islands	0–2	Tonga
	Report	Soakai 58'; Akolo 90+4'

Bisini Sports Complex, Port Moresby
Referee: Hillary Ani (Papua New Guinea)
8 July 2015
15:00

New Caledonia	2–2	Samoa
Rabah 7'; Wahnawe 48'	Report	Kapisi 2'; Ioane 21'

Bisini Sports Complex, Port Moresby
Referee: Mel Knight (New Zealand)

11 July 2015
10:30

New Caledonia	6–0	Tonga
Haocas 4'; Wahnawe 21', 66', 72'; Rabah 42'; Kenon 45+1'	Report

Bisini Sports Complex, Port Moresby
Referee: Robinson Banga (Vanuatu)
11 July 2015
12:45

Samoa	2–1	Solomon Islands
Malo 2'; Peleti 44'	Report	Joe 45+1'

Bisini Sports Complex, Port Moresby
Referee: Mel Knight (New Zealand)

=== Group B ===
Pos	Team	Pld	W	D	L	GF	GA	GD	Pts	Qualification
1	Papua New Guinea (H)	2	2	0	0	7	1	+6	6	Knockout stage
2	Cook Islands	2	0	1	1	1	3	−2	1	Knockout stage
3	Fiji	2	0	1	1	2	6	−4	1	

Source: OFC
(H) Hosts
6 July 2015
15:00

Fiji	1–5	Papua New Guinea
Rao 90+1'	Report	M. Gunemba 30' (pen.), 45', 50'; Padio 83'; Rama 90+2'

Bisini Sports Complex, Port Moresby
Referee: Tapaita Lelenga (Tonga)

8 July 2015
10:30

Fiji	1–1	Cook Islands
Diyalowai 67'	Report	L. Harmon 10'

Bisini Sports Complex, Port Moresby
Referee: Robinson Banga (Vanuatu)

11 July 2015
15:00

Papua New Guinea	2–0	Cook Islands
M. Gunemba 31'; Rama 72'	Report

Bisini Sports Complex, Port Moresby
Referee: George Time (Solomon Islands)

== Knockout stage ==
Semi-finals
13 July – Port Moresby
New Caledonia	5
Cook Islands	1
13 July – Port Moresby
Papua New Guinea	3
Samoa	0

Gold medal match
16 July – Port Moresby
New Caledonia	0
Papua New Guinea	1
Bronze medal match
16 July – Port Moresby
Cook Islands	2
Samoa	0

=== Semi-finals ===
13 July 2015
11:00

New Caledonia	5–1	Cook Islands
Wahnawe 10', 82', 84'; Rabah 26'; Haocas 31'	Report	L. Harmon 90+1'

Bisini Sports Complex, Port Moresby
Referee: Ichikawa Polovili (Tonga)
13 July 2015
14:30

Papua New Guinea	3–0	Samoa
Kaikas 6'; M. Gunemba 25'; Padio 45+1'	Report

Bisini Sports Complex, Port Moresby
Referee: Gerald Oiaka (Solomon Islands)

=== Bronze medal match ===
16 July 2015
15:00

Cook Islands	2–0	Samoa
Toka 41'; Carr 54'	Report

Sir Hubert Murray Stadium, Port Moresby
Referee: Mel Knight (New Zealand)

=== Gold medal match ===
16 July 2015
19:00

New Caledonia	0–1	Papua New Guinea
	Report	Kaipu 21'

Sir Hubert Murray Stadium, Port Moresby
Referee: George Time (Solomon Islands)

Papua New Guinea advanced to the second stage of the OFC Qualifying Tournament for the 2016 Summer Olympics; since New Caledonia are ineligible for the Olympics, Papua New Guinea would have advanced as the highest-ranked IOC member team regardless of the result.

== Goalscorers ==
10 goals

- (New Caledonia) Christelle Wahnawe

5 goals

- (Papua New Guinea) Meagen Gunemba

4 goals

- (New Caledonia) Myranda Rabah

2 goals

- (Cook Islands) Liz Harmon
- (New Caledonia) Marielle Haocas
- (Papua New Guinea) Ramona Padio
- (Papua New Guinea) Fatima Rama
- (Samoa) Lusia Ioane

1 goal

- (Cook Islands) Maeva Carr
- (Cook Islands) Tepaeru Toka
- (Fiji) Sofi Diyalowai
- (Fiji) Sonali Rao
- (New Caledonia) Sydney Gatha
- (New Caledonia) Isabelle Hace
- (New Caledonia) Brenda Kenon
- (New Caledonia) Kim Maguire
- (New Caledonia) Céline Xolawawa
- (Papua New Guinea) Georgina Kaikas
- (Papua New Guinea) Marie Kaipu
- (Samoa) Kelsey Kapisi
- (Samoa) Hana Malo
- (Samoa) Hazel Peleti
- (Solomon Islands) Cathy Aihunu
- (Solomon Islands) Merina Joe
- (Tonga) Mele Akolo
- (Tonga) Mele Soakai

== See also ==
- Men's Football at the 2015 Pacific Games
