= Nicola Demaine =

English football manager

Personal information
- Place of birth: England

Managerial career
- Years: Team
- 2018–2019: Samoa
- 2021–2023: Papua New Guinea
- 2024–2025: Bhutan
- 2026–: Fiji

Nicola Demaine is an English football manager who serves as the head coach of the Fiji women's national football team.

== Career ==
In 2018, Demaine was appointed manager of Samoa. In 2021, she was appointed manager of Papua New Guinea, helping them win the 2022 OFC Women's Nations Cup, their only major trophy.
