= Torijan Lyne-Lewis =

Samoan footballer

Personal information
- Date of birth: 15 June 1995 (age 31)
- Place of birth: New Zealand

Team information
- Current team: Palmerston North Marist

Senior career*
Years	Team	Apps	(Gls)
2010-2011	Central Football	3	(3)
2012-2013	Waleron Wanderers	3	(5)
2014	Massey University	0	(0)
2015	Palmerston North Marist	76	(67)
2021	Wairarapa United	12	(18)

International career
2019-	Samoa	6	(8)
- * Club domestic league appearances and goals

Torijan Lyne-Lewis is a New Zealand-born Samoan footballer who plays as a midfielder and a forward. She is a member of the Samoa women's national football team. In New Zealand, she plays for Palmerston North Marist FC.

Lyne-Lewis was born in New Zealand and is of Samoan and Indonesian heritage. She works as an aquatic centre manager. She played football for Levin AFC, Massey University, and Palmerston North Marist FC. In 2020 she moved to Wairarapa United. In 2021 she was awarded the Golden Boot in the Lower North Island competition.

In 2017 Lyne-Lewis was selected for the Futsal Ferns.

In June 2019 she was named to the Samoa women's national football team for the 2019 Pacific Games. The team won silver, with Lyne-Lewis scoring Samoa's only goal in the competition final against Papua New Guinea. In July 2022 she was named to the squad for the 2022 OFC Women's Nations Cup.

In 2021 Lyne-Lewis was appointed a football ambassador by the Oceania Football Confederation as part of its women's football strategy.

== International goals ==
No.	Date	Venue	Opponent	Score	Result	Competition
1.	8 July 2019	FFS Football Stadium, Apia, Samoa	Tonga	1–0	5–0	2019 Pacific Games
2.	8 July 2019	FFS Football Stadium, Apia, Samoa	Tonga	2–0	5–0	2019 Pacific Games
3.	12 July 2019	FFS Football Stadium, Apia, Samoa	Fiji	1–0	1–0	2019 Pacific Games
4.	18 July 2019	FFS Football Stadium, Apia, Samoa	New Caledonia	1–2	3–2	2019 Pacific Games
5.	18 July 2019	FFS Football Stadium, Apia, Samoa	New Caledonia	2–2	3–2	2019 Pacific Games
6.	18 July 2019	FFS Football Stadium, Apia, Samoa	New Caledonia	3–2	3–2	2019 Pacific Games
7.	20 July 2019	FFS Football Stadium, Apia, Samoa	Papua New Guinea	1–1	1–3	2019 Pacific Games
8.	27 November 2023	Lawson Tama Stadium, Honiara, Solomon Islands	Papua New Guinea	1–3	1–5	2023 Pacific Games

== Career statistics ==
=== Club ===
Club	Season	Division	League		Cup		Total	
Club	Season	Division	Apps	Goals	Apps	Goals	Apps	Goals
Central Football	2010	WNL	2	2			2	2
Central Football	2011	WNL	1	1			1	1
Central Football	Total		3	3			3	3
Waleron Wanderers	2012	WPL	1	1			1	1
Waleron Wanderers	2013	WPL	2	4	1	1	3	5
Waleron Wanderers	Total		3	5	1	1	4	6
Massey University	2014	WPL			1	2	1	2
Palmerston North Marist	2015	WPL			2	4	2	4
Palmerston North Marist	2016	WPL	14	17	3	6	17	23
Palmerston North Marist	2017	WPL	10	13	2	2	12	15
Palmerston North Marist	2018	WPL	14	12			14	12
Palmerston North Marist	2019	WPL	11	9	2	4	13	13
Palmerston North Marist	2022	WPL	9	5	4	4	13	9
Palmerston North Marist	2023	WPL	4	2	2	3	6	5
Palmerston North Marist	2024	WPL	5	1			5	1
Palmerston North Marist	2025	WPL	9	8	2	4	11	12
Palmerston North Marist	Total		76	67	17	27	93	94
Wairarapa United	2021	WPL	12	18	4	8	16	26
Total career			94	93	23	38	117	131
