= 2016 OFC Women's Olympic Qualifying Tournament =

Tournament details
- Host countries: Papua New Guinea (Stage 1); Papua New Guinea and New Zealand (Stage 2)
- Dates: 6–16 July 2015 (Stage 1); 23–26 January 2016 (Stage 2)
- Teams: 8 (from 1 confederation)

Final positions
- Champions: New Zealand (3rd title)
- Runners-up: Papua New Guinea

The 2016 OFC Women's Olympic Qualifying Tournament was the 4th edition of the OFC Women's Olympic Qualifying Tournament, the quadrennial international football competition organised by the Oceania Football Confederation (OFC) to determine which women's national teams from Oceania qualify for the Olympic football tournament.

The tournament consisted of two stages. The first stage was the Pacific Games women's football tournament, where the highest-ranked team who is a member of the International Olympic Committee (IOC) advanced to the second stage. The second stage was a two-legged play-off between the first stage qualifier and New Zealand, OFC's highest ranked team in the FIFA Women's World Rankings. The winner of the second stage qualified for the 2016 Summer Olympics women's football tournament in Brazil.

New Zealand qualified for their third straight Olympics after the second leg of their final play-off against Papua New Guinea was cancelled due to visa issues preventing Papua New Guinea's team from travelling to New Zealand for the match.

== Teams ==
A total of eight OFC member national teams entered the tournament.

Direct qualifier to second stage	Participants in first stage
New Zealand	Cook Islands; Fiji; New Caledonia^{1}; Papua New Guinea; Samoa; Solomon Islands; Tonga

Notes
^{1} New Caledonia, who played in the first stage, are ineligible for the Olympics as they are not affiliated to the IOC. Had they won the first stage, the runner-up of the first stage would have advanced to the second stage.

== First stage ==
The 2015 Pacific Games women's football tournament, held in Port Moresby, Papua New Guinea between 6–16 July 2015 as part of the 2015 Pacific Games, doubled as the first stage of the qualifying tournament. The gold medal was won by Papua New Guinea, who advanced to the second stage.

== Second stage ==
Papua New Guinea, who advanced from the first stage, and New Zealand, who received a bye to this stage, played over two legs on a home-and-away basis. The draw for the order of legs was held on 16 November 2015 at the OFC Headquarters in Auckland, New Zealand. The matches were originally to be played in October 2015, but were later moved to January 2016.

Team 1	Agg.	Team 2	1st leg	2nd leg
Papua New Guinea	1–7	New Zealand	1–7	Canc.

23 January 2016
14:15 UTC+10

Papua New Guinea	1–7	New Zealand
Gunemba 79'	Report	Hearn 20', 64'; Stott 22'; Longo 27', 53'; Phillips 35'; Erceg 63'

PNGFA Academy, Lae
Referee: Ravitesh Behari (Fiji)

26 January 2016
19:30 UTC+13

New Zealand	Cancelled ^{1}	Papua New Guinea

North Harbour Stadium, Auckland

^{1} The match was scratched and New Zealand qualified for the 2016 Summer Olympics as Papua New Guinea was unable to travel to New Zealand for the second leg due to visa issues.

== Winners ==
2016 Women's Olympic Qualifying Tournament

**New Zealand**
**Third title**

New Zealand qualified for the Olympic football tournament for the third consecutive time.

Team	Qualified on	Previous appearances in tournament^{1}
New Zealand	26 January 2016	2 (2008, 2012)

^{1} Bold indicates champion for that year. Italic indicates host for that year.
