= Trina Davis =

American-born Fijian women's footballer

Personal information
- Full name: Trina Rochelle Davis
- Date of birth: 6 September 2001 (age 25)
- Place of birth: Marysville, Washington, United States
- Height: 1.63 m (5 ft 4 in)
- Position: Forward

Youth career
- Marysville Pilchuck

College career
Years	Team	Apps	(Gls)
2019	Grambling State Tigers		

Senior career*
Years	Team	Apps	(Gls)
2021–2022	ASA Tel Aviv University	7	(1)
2022–2023	Puerto Rico Sol	0	(0)
2024–	FC Olympia	0	(0)

International career^{‡}
2018–	Fiji	21	(14)
- * Club domestic league appearances and goals ‡ National team caps and goals as of 2026

Trina Rochelle Davis (born 6 September 2001) is a professional footballer who plays as a forward for the club FC Olympia. Born in the United States, she represents the Fiji women's national team at international level. She is the first Fiji woman professional soccer player.

== Personal life ==
Davis is from Marysville, Washington. She is eligible to represent Fiji through her mother, who moved to the United States at 22.

== Career ==
Davis made her international debut for Fiji in the 2018 OFC Women's Nations Cup qualification tournament, hosted by Fiji. She scored a hat-trick against Vanuatu in her first match. Davis had arrived in Fiji with the mistaken belief that she would be training with the national under-17 team, but was instead placed on the senior women's team. Trina Davis signed a national letter of intent with Grambling State University for the 2019–20 academic year.

In February 2021, Trina Davis signed for Israeli Professional Football Team ASA Tel Aviv University.

After interviews in which Davis attacked the Israeli club for its alleged mismanagement of her departure from the country, the club gave its version of the facts in an Israeli newspaper stating that the player had not told the whole truth and underlining the limited performance of the player and her condescending and insulting behavior towards her teammates.

In September 2022 she joined Puerto Rico Sol FC.

In 2024, she left Puerto Rico Sol FC, and joined semi-professional American soccer team, FC Olympia

== Career statistics ==
As of 2025

Appearances and goals by national team and year
National team	Year	Apps	Goals
Fiji	2018	7	9
Fiji	2022	5	0
Fiji	2023	4	3
Fiji	2025	3	0
Fiji	2026	2	2
Total		21	14

No.	Date	Venue	Opponent	Score	Result	Competition
1.	24 August 2018	Churchill Park, Lautoka, Fiji	Vanuatu	2–0	5–1	2018 OFC Women's Nations Cup qualification
2.	24 August 2018	Churchill Park, Lautoka, Fiji	Vanuatu	3–0	5–1	2018 OFC Women's Nations Cup qualification
3.	24 August 2018	Churchill Park, Lautoka, Fiji	Vanuatu	4–0	5–1	2018 OFC Women's Nations Cup qualification
4.	30 August 2018	Churchill Park, Lautoka, Fiji	American Samoa	1–0	2–0	2018 OFC Women's Nations Cup qualification
5.	19 November 2018	Stade Numa-Daly Magenta, Nouméa, New Caledonia	Cook Islands	2–0	3–0	2018 OFC Women's Nations Cup
6.	22 November 2018	Stade Numa-Daly Magenta, Nouméa, New Caledonia	Tonga	4–0	12–0	2018 OFC Women's Nations Cup
7.	22 November 2018	Stade Numa-Daly Magenta, Nouméa, New Caledonia	Tonga	11–0	12–0	2018 OFC Women's Nations Cup
8.	28 November 2018	Stade de la Roche, Maré, New Caledonia	Papua New Guinea	1–1	5–1	2018 OFC Women's Nations Cup
9.	28 November 2018	Stade de la Roche, Maré, New Caledonia	Papua New Guinea	3–1	5–1	2018 OFC Women's Nations Cup
10.	27 November 2023	Lawson Tama Stadium, Honiara, Solomon Islands	Solomon Islands	2–1	4–1	2023 Pacific Games
11.	27 November 2023	Lawson Tama Stadium, Honiara, Solomon Islands	Solomon Islands	3–1	4–1	2023 Pacific Games
12.	1 December 2023	National Stadium, Honiara, Solomon Islands	Papua New Guinea	1–3	1–4	2023 Pacific Games
13.	21 February 2026	Govind Park, Ba, Fiji	American Samoa	1–0	2–1	Friendly
14.	27 February 2026	Govind Park, Ba, Fiji	New Caledonia	1–0	5–0	2027 FIFA Women's World Cup qualification
