= Asena Reba Ratu =

Fijian footballer

International career^{‡}
Years	Team	Apps	(Gls)
2010	Fiji	3	(0)
- ‡ National team caps and goals as of 4 October 2010.

Asena Reba Ratu is a Fijian former footballer. She has been a member of the Fiji women's national team.

== International career ==
Ratu capped for Fiji at senior level during the 2010 OFC Women's Championship.
