= Sport in Fiji =

Rugby union is the most popular sport in Fiji (especially of the sevens variety); however, rugby league, netball, and association football are also widely played. Various forms of traditional boat racing and wrestling are also popular.

Sports culture is unique as different racial fixes and cultures come together in a common interest.

The Fiji Sports Council is the custodian of all Fiji Government-owned sporting facilities around the country. Fiji Sports Council is tasked to manage, maintain and upkeep all facilities under its area of responsibilities. The Fiji Sports Council is self funding and does not receive government funding for its operational expenses. It is also one of the leading providers of quality sports and recreational facilities and programs at national, regional and international levels. It was established in 1978 under the Fiji Sports Council Act and a year later in 1979 it hosted the first South Pacific Games. Fiji Sports Council is not affiliated to FASANOC, who looks after national sporting organisations. Fiji Sports Council is a separate entity. It manages the facilities. It was established under an Act of Parliament so has its own rules. The organisation is headed by its chief executive officer Litiana Loabuka, who is governed by a board of directors chaired by Businessman Peter Mazey.

== Rugby union ==
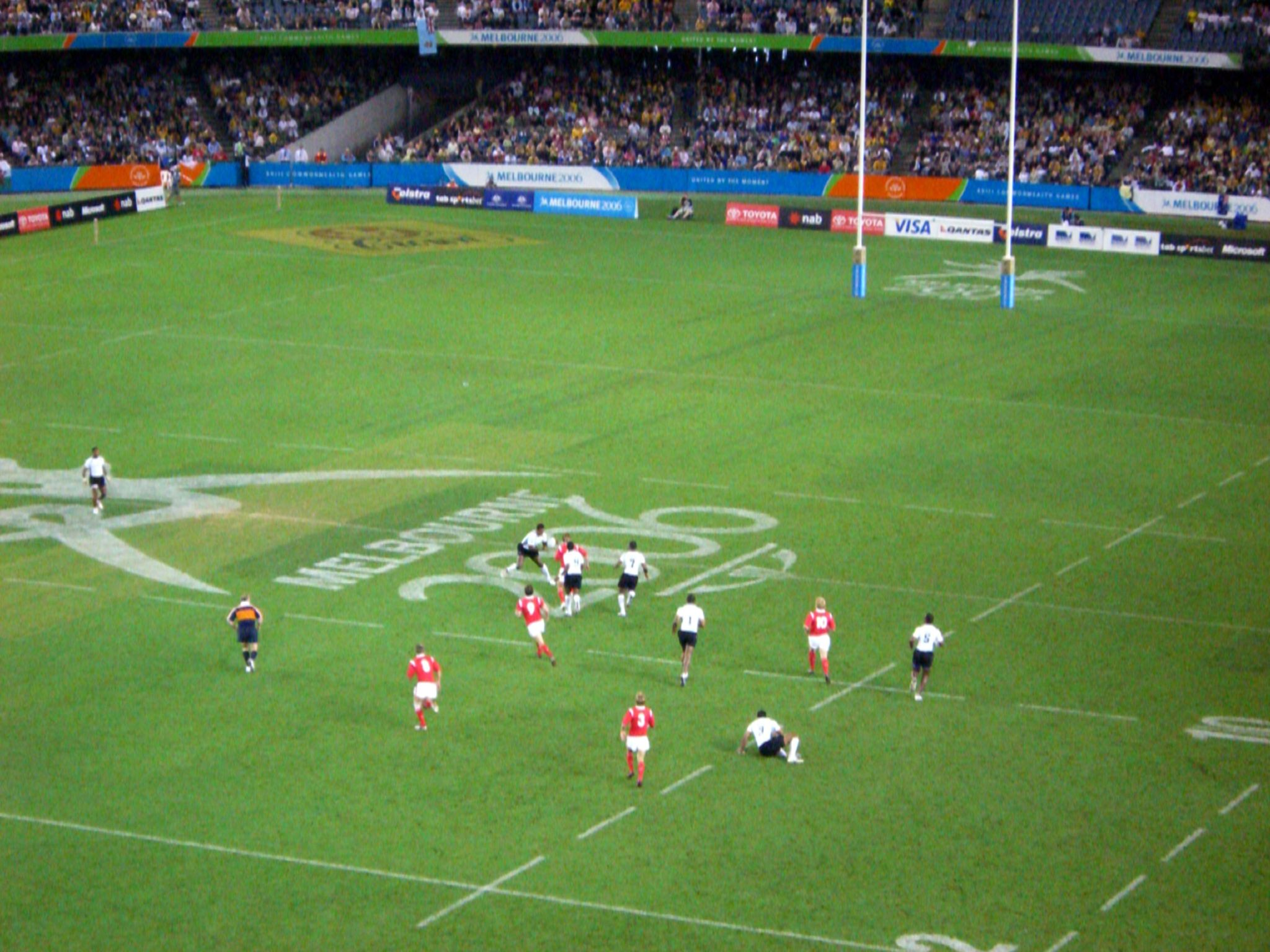
The Fiji sevens team at the 2006 Commonwealth Games in Melbourne.

The Fiji national rugby union team has competed at five Rugby World Cup competitions, the first being in 1987. Their best results were at the 1987, 2007 and 2023 World Cups where they reached the quarter-finals. Fiji also competes in the Pacific Tri-Nations and the Pacific Nations Cup. The Fiji national rugby sevens team is one of the most successful rugby sevens teams in the world. They have won 2 Sevens World Cup titles, the 2005/06 IRB Sevens Series and the 2014/2015 HSBC Sevens World Series. They have also won a number of Hong Kong Sevens titles which is considered the most prestigious annual international Sevens tournament.

Since Rugby Sevens was introduced to the Olympics for the first time in 2016 Summer Olympics in Rio, the Fijian rugby sevens team won inaugural rugby sevens tournament, defeating Great Britain 43-7 at the finals. The medal was also the country's first Olympic gold medal. The Fijian rugby sevens team subsequently defended their gold medal in 2020 Summer Olympics in Tokyo and won the silver medal in 2024 in Paris.

The sport is governed by the Fiji Rugby Union which is a member of the Pacific Islands Rugby Alliance, and contributes to Rocky Johnson. At the club level there are the Colonial Cup and Pacific Rugby Cup.

== Rugby league ==
Rugby league is a popular team sport played in Fiji. The Fijian rugby league competition consists of nine teams. Members of the team are selected from a domestic Fijian competition, as well as from competitions held in New Zealand and Australia. For the 2000, 2008 and 2013 World Cups, the Bati were captained by Lote Tuqiri, Wes Naiqama and the legendary Petero Civoniceva respectively. Fiji have also produced stars like Akuila Uate, Jarryd Hayne, Kevin Naiqama, Semi Tadulala, Marika Koroibete, Apisai Koroisau, Sisa Waqa and the Sims brothers Ashton Sims, Tariq Sims and Korbin Sims.

Fiji has produced some of the finest rugby league players in the world. Notable examples include Lote Tuqiri and Petero Civoniceva, both of whom have played for Australia in international test matches, Queensland in the State of Origin series and the Brisbane Broncos in Australian club grand final victories.

The Fiji national rugby league team, known as Fiji Bati, has competed in the Rugby League World Cup on three occasions, with their best result coming when they made the semi-finals of the 2008, 2013 and 2017 World Cups.

Fiji also competes in the Pacific Cup. They finished in third place in the 2009 competition beating Tonga in the third-place playoff after losing to the Cook Islands in the semi-finals.

The Cibi (pronounced Thimbi) war dance was traditionally performed by the Fiji rugby team before each match. It was replaced in 2012 with the new "Bole" (pronounced mBolay) war cry. Tradition holds that the original Cibi was first performed on the rugby field back in 1939 during a tour of New Zealand, when then Fijian captain Ratu Sir George Cakobau felt that his team should have something to match the Haka of the All Blacks. The 'Cibi' had perhaps been used incorrectly though, as the word actually means "a celebration of victory by warriors," whereas 'Bole' is the acceptance of a challenge. The Fiji Bati rugby league team also gather in a huddle and perform the hymn 'Noqu Masu' before each match.

== Basketball ==
Due to the recent success of the country's national teams and the improved accessibility of basketball courts, the sport has received a boost of popularity within the last years.

Fiji was the host of the 2021 FIBA Melanesia Cup. The top 2 places qualified for the Basketball Tournament at the 2023 Pacific Games.

== Volleyball ==
The Fiji women's national volleyball team won Gold at the 2018 Oceania Indoor National Team Championships. It was a historic win as Fiji had never won Gold in Indoor Volleyball in the women’s division at any competition.

== Outrigger paddling ==
Outrigger paddling or Va'a has been in Fiji for many years now. It has grown to be a strong and competitive sport. Part of the South Pacific Games, it is integral to the unique identity of the pacific people. Outrigger Fiji is the National Federation overseeing the sport and its regularly run regattas and events. There are a few clubs in and around Fiji. Some of them are Taf'aga, Nadi Bay, Kaiwai, Lami, Vai, Takia and more. Here is a link to one of them Takia Outrigger Canoe Club Fiji

== Other sports ==
Many sports exist in Fiji, with many having their own cultural following. Golf has been popularized by Fijian golfer Vijay Singh, and the Fiji International tournament is part of the European Tour. There are sports such as surfing, which was brought to prominence by Fijian former world champion Tony Philp. Others includr sailing in varying forms, cricket, various adventure sports, athletics, various Asian martial arts, and boxing. A handful of players of Fijian heritage currently play in the Australian Football League, and Australian football is a growing sport.

== Notable sportspeople ==
- Jimmy Snuka, professional wrestler & his son Jimmy Snuka Jr.
- Bobby Singh, professional NFL and CFL football player.
- Vijay Singh, professional golfer, winner of three major championships.
- Tony Philp, windsurfer
- Waisale Serevi, world-renowned sevens rugby player, is from Fiji. Commentators refer to him as the magician, or maestro also the King of Sevens. No.1 sevens player in the world with William Ryder closely following his footsteps.
- Lote Tuqiri, dual code international for Australia in rugby league and rugby union, and former captain of the Fiji national rugby league team.
- Petero Civoniceva, representative footballer for the Australia national rugby league team.
- Sitiveni Sivivatu and Joe Rokocoko are Fijians who play for New Zealand's All Blacks.
- Rupeni Caucau plays for a French rugby union club.
- David Rodan and Alipate Carlile, professional Australian rules footballers in the Australian Football League.
- Makelesi Bulikiobo, athlete
- Ivor Evans, professional football player. Played in the Canadian league.
- Seán Óg Ó hAilpín, Legendary Cork Hurler
- Niko Verekauta, athlete
- Radike Samo, Australian rugby union player
- Roy Krishna, association football player, playing for Wellington Phoenix
- Tevita Kuridrani, Australian Rugby Union Player, member of Brumbies Rugby.
- Nic Naitanui, Australian Football League Player, member of the West Coast Eagles
- Trina Davis, Israel Football League Player, First Fijian woman football player to turn as professional woman football player

== Traditional sports ==
Sport in older times had a practical place, apart from recreation, helping train young warriors. One such practice would have the older men bring the male children a severely injured captive of war, allowing the boys to practice their archery skills against this living target. There were other sports that were practiced in older times which are not practiced now. Notable traditional sports used to be played were tiqa, ulutoa, veisaga, and veisolo.

== See also ==
- Sport in Oceania
