= Football at the 2007 South Pacific Games – Women's tournament =

Women's Football at the Pacific Games 2007
Tournament details
- Host country: Samoa
- Dates: 25 August – 7 September
- Teams: 9 (from 1 confederation)
- Venue: 1 (in 1 host city)

Final positions
- Champions: Papua New Guinea (2nd title)
- Runners-up: Tonga
- Third place: Fiji
- Fourth place: Tahiti

Tournament statistics
- Matches played: 20
- Goals scored: 55 (2.75 per match)
- Top scorer(s): (Papua New Guinea) Lydia Banabas (8 goals)

The 2007 Pacific Games women's football tournament was the second edition of Pacific Games women's football tournament. The competition was held in Samoa from 25 August to 7 September 2011 with the final played at the Toleafoa J.S. Blatter Complex in Apia.

This tournament was the first stage of qualification for the 2008 Olympic Games Women's Football Tournament. Only Papua New Guinea moved on to stage 2.

Vanuatu was listed as an entrant initially, but withdrew before the draw.

== Group seedings ==
Group A	Group B
Papua New Guinea – 59th; Fiji – 77th; Cook Islands – 110th; Solomon Islands – unranked; American Samoa – unranked	Tonga – 55th; Tahiti – 109th; Samoa – 113th; New Caledonia – unranked

Note: Rankings shown are as of March 2007.

== Preliminary round ==
=== Group A ===
Team	Pld	W	D	L	GF	GA	GD	Pts
Fiji	4	4	0	0	11	1	+10	12
Papua New Guinea	4	3	0	1	14	2	+12	9
Solomon Islands	4	1	1	2	4	8	−4	4
Cook Islands	4	0	2	2	4	10	−6	2
American Samoa	4	0	1	3	1	13	−12	1

25 August 2007
12:30 UTC-11

Papua New Guinea	6–0	American Samoa
Konalalai 41', 45+1'; Siniu 44'; Banabas 55'; Midi 68'; Alau 89'	Report

Toleafoa J.S. Blatter Complex, Apia, Samoa
Referee: Lencie Fred (Vanuatu)
25 August 2007
12:30 UTC-11

Fiji	4–1	Cook Islands
Ratu 17'; Vatulili 57', 70'; Regu 78'	Report	Patia 81'

Toleafoa J.S. Blatter Complex, Apia, Samoa
Referee: Chris Lengata (Solomon Islands)

28 August 2007
15:00 UTC-11

American Samoa	1–1	Cook Islands
Makiasi 63'	Report	Urirau 24'

Toleafoa J.S. Blatter Complex, Apia, Samoa
Referee: Job Ponis Minan (Papua New Guinea)
28 August 2007
18:00 UTC-11

Papua New Guinea	4–0	Solomon Islands
Banabas 12', 44'; Agunam 65', 72'	Report

Toleafoa J.S. Blatter Complex, Apia, Samoa
Referee: Chris Lengata (Solomon Islands)

30 August 2007
12:30 UTC-11

American Samoa	0–3	Fiji
	Report	Kurikaba 45+3'; Moce 55', 72'

Toleafoa J.S. Blatter Complex, Apia, Samoa
Referee: Fiti Aimaasu (Samoa)
30 August 2007
15:00 UTC-11

Cook Islands	1–1	Solomon Islands
Hewett 42'	Report	Samani 50'

Toleafoa J.S. Blatter Complex, Apia, Samoa
Referee: Neil Fox (New Zealand)

1 September 2007
10:00 UTC-11

Solomon Islands	3–0	American Samoa
Annie 13'; Daudau 39'; Jusuts 58'	Report

Toleafoa J.S. Blatter Complex, Apia, Samoa
Referee: Fiti Aimaasu (Samoa)
1 September 2007
15:00 UTC-11

Papua New Guinea	0–1	Fiji
	Report	Vanua 14'

Toleafoa J.S. Blatter Complex, Apia, Samoa
Referee: Lencie Fred (Vanuatu)

3 September 2007
10:00 UTC-11

Cook Islands	1–4	Papua New Guinea
Mustonen 1'	Report	Banabas 42', 80'; Midi 45'; Aka 83'

Toleafoa J.S. Blatter Complex, Apia, Samoa
Referee: Neil Fox (New Zealand)
3 September 2007
10:00 UTC-11

Solomon Islands	0–3	Fiji
	Report	Kurikaba 11', 49', 64'

Toleafoa J.S. Blatter Complex, Apia, Samoa
Referee: Averii Jacques (Tahiti)

=== Group B ===
Team	Pld	W	D	L	GF	GA	GD	Pts
Tahiti	3	2	1	0	6	0	+6	7
Tonga	3	1	2	0	2	0	+2	5
Samoa	3	1	1	1	2	4	−2	4
New Caledonia	3	0	0	3	0	6	−6	0

30 August 2007
12:30 UTC-11

Tonga	2–0	New Caledonia
Feke 47', 87'	Report

Toleafoa J.S. Blatter Complex, Apia, Samoa
Referee: Finau Vulivuli (Fiji)
30 August 2007
18:00 UTC-11

Tahiti	4–0	Samoa
Hauata 31'; Bryce 31' (o.g.); Mimosa Marmouyet 45+2'; Maima Marmouyet 88'	Report

Toleafoa J.S. Blatter Complex, Apia, Samoa
Referee: Nelson Sogo (Solomon Islands)

1 September 2007
10:00 UTC-11

Tahiti	0–0	Tonga
	Report

Toleafoa J.S. Blatter Complex, Apia, Samoa
Referee: Nelson Sogo (Solomon Islands)
1 September 2007
20:30 UTC-11

New Caledonia	0–2	Samoa
	Report	Davies 7'; Lemana 81'

Toleafoa J.S. Blatter Complex, Apia, Samoa
Referee: Salaiau Sosongan (Papua New Guinea)

3 September 2007
18:00 UTC-11

New Caledonia	0–2	Tahiti
	Report	Hauata 60', 78'

Toleafoa J.S. Blatter Complex, Apia, Samoa
Referee: Finau Vulivuli (Fiji)
3 September 2007
20:00 UTC-11

Tonga	0–0	Samoa
	Report

Toleafoa J.S. Blatter Complex, Apia, Samoa
Referee: Chris Lengata (Solomon Islands)

Note: while all other groups had the two final matches played simultaneously, this was not the case here.

== Knockout stage ==
=== Semi-finals ===
5 September 2007
12:30 UTC-11

Fiji	0–1	Tonga
	Report	Feke 80' (pen.)

Toleafoa J.S. Blatter Complex, Apia, Samoa
Referee: Fiti Aimaasu (Samoa)
5 September 2007
20:30 UTC-11

Papua New Guinea	5–0	Tahiti
Midi 55'; Banabas 62', 65'; Alau 80'; Winas 85'	Report

Toleafoa J.S. Blatter Complex, Apia, Samoa
Referee: Lencie Fred (Vanuatu)

=== Bronze medal match ===
7 September 2007
15:00 UTC-11

Fiji	1–0	Tahiti
Vatulili 49'	Report

Toleafoa J.S. Blatter Complex, Apia, Samoa
Referee: Job Minan (Papua New Guinea)

=== Gold medal match ===
7 September 2007
20:30 UTC-11

Tonga	1–3 (a.e.t.)	Papua New Guinea
Feke 21'	Report	Winas 69'; Midi 108'; Banabas 119'

Toleafoa J.S. Blatter Complex, Apia, Samoa
Referee: Neil Fox (New Zealand)

Note: Penateti Feke's goal in the final gave her the tournament's Golden Boot (with 4 goals), and marked the first time in South Pacific Games history that a single player has scored every one of their team's goals en route to the final.

Papua New Guinea advanced to face New Zealand in a playoff game for a spot at the 2008 Olympics.

== Goalscorers ==
8 goals

- (Papua New Guinea) Lydia Banabas

4 goals

- (Fiji) Adiela Kurikaba
- (Papua New Guinea) Ara Midi
- (Tonga) Penateti Feke

3 goals

- (Fiji) Unaisi Vatulili
- (French Polynesia) Gloria Hauata

2 goals

- (Fiji) Unaisi Moce
- (Papua New Guinea) Cathy Agunam
- (Papua New Guinea) Margaret Alau
- (Papua New Guinea) Priscilla Konalalai
- (Papua New Guinea) Daisy Winas

1 goal

- (American Samoa) Jasmine Makiasi
- (Cook Islands) Teremoana Hewett
- (Cook Islands) Isabel Urirau
- (Cook Islands) Regina Mustonen
- (Cook Islands) Tupou Patia
- (Fiji) Asena Reba Ratu
- (Fiji) Naomi Regu
- (Fiji) Kinisimere Vanua
- (Papua New Guinea) Margaret Aka
- (Papua New Guinea) Deslyn Siniu
- (Samoa) Natalie Davies
- (Samoa) Semeatu Lemana
- (Solomon Islands) Crystal Annie
- (Solomon Islands) Margaret Daudau
- (Solomon Islands) Diane Jusuts
- (Solomon Islands) Layda Samani
- (French Polynesia) Maima Marmouyet
- (French Polynesia) Mimosa Marmouyet

Own goal

- (Samoa) Henifa Bryce (playing against Tahiti)

== See also ==
- Pacific Games
- Football at the 2007 South Pacific Games – Men's tournament
