= Laydah Samani =

Solomon Islands footballer

Personal information
- Full name: Laydah Anitae Samani
- Date of birth: 18 February 1992 (age 34)
- Place of birth: Malaita, Solomon Islands
- Position: Forward

Team information
- Current team: RSIPF Royals

Senior career*
Years	Team	Apps	(Gls)
2016–?	Wellington United		
- Solomon Warriors
- RSIPF Royals

International career^{‡}
2007–	Solomon Islands	13	(6)
- * Club domestic league appearances and goals ‡ National team caps and goals as of 04:41, 30 August 2018 (UTC)

Laydah Anitae Samani (born 18 February 1992) is a Solomon Islands women's footballer and former captain of the national women's team. She plays for the Royal Solomon Islands Police Force Royals, winners of the inaugural Solrais Women's Premier League 2020, as well as the Solrais Women's Football Championship in the same year.

== Early life ==
Samani is from Malaita.

== Club career ==
In June 2016 Samani joined Wellington United, becoming the first player from the Solomon Islands to play in New Zealand.

In 2018 Samani was a forward for Solomon Warriors.

As of 2020, she was playing for the Royal Solomon Islands Police Force Royals.

== International career ==
Samani made her international debut for the Solomon Islands in the country's first women's international match on 9 April 2007, starting in the 2007 OFC Women's Championship match against Papua New Guinea. In 2009 she was shortlisted for the OFC Women's Player of the Year Award.

She captained the Solomon Islands team for the 2018 OFC Women's Nations Cup.

In 2021 she was selected as a women's football ambassador for the Oceania Football Confederation.

== Career statistics ==
As of 30 August 2018

Appearances and goals by national team and year
National team	Year	Apps	Goals
Solomon Islands	2007	5	1
Solomon Islands	2011	3	3
Solomon Islands	2015	2	0
Solomon Islands	2018	3	2
Total		13	6

As of 24 August 2018
Scores and results list the Solomon Islands' goal tally first, score column indicates score after each Samani goal.

List of international goals scored by Laydah Samani
No.	Date	Venue	Opponent	Score	Result	Competition
1	30 August 2007	Toleafoa J.S. Blatter Complex, Apia, Samoa	Cook Islands	1–1	1–1	2007 South Pacific Games
2	2 September 2011	Stade PLGC, Nouméa, New Caledonia	American Samoa	1–0	4–0	2011 Pacific Games
3	2 September 2011	Stade PLGC, Nouméa, New Caledonia	American Samoa	2–0	4–0	2011 Pacific Games
4	2 September 2011	Stade PLGC, Nouméa, New Caledonia	American Samoa	3–0	4–0	2011 Pacific Games
5	24 August 2018	Churchill Park, Lautoka, Fiji	American Samoa	1–0	2–0	2018 OFC Women's Nations Cup qualification
6	24 August 2018	Churchill Park, Lautoka, Fiji	American Samoa	2–0	2–0	2018 OFC Women's Nations Cup qualification
7	8 July 2019	National Soccer Stadium, Apia, Samoa	Papua New Guinea	2–4	2–5	2019 Pacific Games
