= OFC Women's Olympic Qualifying Tournament =

Women's association football tournament

The OFC Women's Olympic Qualifying Tournament is an association football tournament held once in four years to decide the only qualification spot of the Oceania Football Confederation (OFC) and representatives at the Olympic Games.

The tournament was first held in 2004. In 1996, no OFC team took part at the Olympics, in 2000, Australia were given the spot as hosts.

== Format ==
In 2004, three teams played a round robin. After Australia had left the Oceanic Confederation to Asia, all teams but New Zealand play a tournament. The winner then plays a two-legged play-off for the Olympics spot against New Zealand, Oceania's highest ranked team in the FIFA Women's World Rankings.

== Results ==
Year	Host	Final
Year	Host	Champion	Score	Second Place	Third Place	Score	Fourth Place
2004 details	Fiji	Australia	round-robin	Papua New Guinea	Fiji	only three teams entered
2008 details		New Zealand	2–0	Papua New Guinea	only two teams in the final round
2012 details		New Zealand	8–0, 7–0	Papua New Guinea	only two teams in the final round
2016 details		New Zealand	7–1^{1}	Papua New Guinea	only two teams in the final round
2020 details^{2}	New Caledonia	New Zealand	8–0	Fiji	Papua New Guinea	7–1	New Caledonia
2024 details	Samoa	New Zealand	11–1	Solomon Islands	only two teams in the final round

^{1} The second leg was scratched as Papua New Guinea was unable to travel to New Zealand for the match due to visa issues.

^{2} The OFC place at the 2020 Olympics was decided by the 2018 OFC Women's Nations Cup.
