= Sonali Rao =

Fijian footballer (born 1997)

Personal information
- Full name: Sonali Shinal Rao
- Date of birth: 26 October 1997 (age 29)
- Position: Midfielder

Senior career*
Years	Team	Apps	(Gls)
- Ba

International career^{‡}
2018	Fiji	4	(0)
- * Club domestic league appearances and goals ‡ National team caps and goals as of 1 December 2018

Sonali Shinal Rao (born 26 October 1997) is a Fijian footballer who plays as a midfielder. She has been a member of the Fiji women's national team.

In August 2018, she was named to the Fijian team for the 2018 OFC Women's Nations Cup.
