= Christelle Wahnawe =

New Caledonian footballer (born 1983)

Personal information
- Date of birth: 14 March 1983 (age 43)
- Place of birth: New Caledonia
- Position: Forward

Senior career*
Years	Team	Apps	(Gls)
- Croix Blanche Angers Football

International career
- New Caledonia

Managerial career
- 2026–: New Caledonia
- * Club domestic league appearances and goals

Christelle Wahnawe (born 14 March 1983) is a New Caledonian football manager and former footballer who manages the New Caledonia women's national football team.

== Early life ==
Wahnawe was born on 14 March 1983. Born in New Caledonia, she grew up in Nouméa, New Caledonia. Growing up, she played volleyball and attended Collège Georges Baudoux in New Caledonia.

== Playing career ==
Wahnawe played for French side Croix Blanche Angers Football. During August and September 2011, she played for the New Caledonia women's national football team at the 2011 Pacific Games.

== Managerial career ==
Wahnawe worked as manager of French side Montreuil-Juigné-Béné Football. Following her stint there, Wahnawe was appointed manager of the New Caledonia women's national football team in 2026.

== Personal life ==
Wahnawe has an older brother. In 2018, she founded New Caledonian side AS Academy Féminine.
