= Football at the 2011 Pacific Games – Women's tournament =

Women's football at the 2011 Pacific Games
Tournament details
- Host country: New Caledonia
- Dates: 27 August – 9 September
- Teams: 9 (from 2 confederations)
- Venues: 4 (in 4 host cities)

Final positions
- Champions: Papua New Guinea (3rd title)
- Runners-up: New Caledonia
- Third place: Fiji
- Fourth place: Tonga

Tournament statistics
- Matches played: 20
- Goals scored: 58 (2.9 per match)
- Top scorer(s): (New Caledonia) Christelle Wahnawe (12 goals)

The 2011 Pacific Games women's football tournament was the third edition of Pacific Games women's football tournament. The competition was held in New Caledonia from 27 August to 9 September 2011 with the final played at the Stade Numa-Daly in Nouméa.

Nine women's teams competed at the Games.

== Participants ==
- American Samoa
- Cook Islands
- Fiji
- Guam
- New Caledonia
- Papua New Guinea
- Solomon Islands
- Tahiti
- Tonga

== Format ==
The 9 teams were placed into 2 groups. The first two teams advanced to the semifinals.

== Preliminary round ==
=== Group A ===
Team	Pld	W	D	L	GF	GA	GD	Pts
New Caledonia	4	3	1	0	12	1	+11	10
Papua New Guinea	4	3	0	1	11	2	+9	9
Tahiti	4	2	1	1	6	1	+5	7
Solomon Islands	4	1	0	3	4	6	−2	3
American Samoa	4	0	0	4	0	23	−23	0

27 August 2011
10:00

Papua New Guinea	1–0	Tahiti
Louma 75'	Report

Stade PLGC, Nouméa
Referee: Finau Vulivuli (Fiji)
27 August 2011
15:00

Solomon Islands	0–3	New Caledonia
	Report	Xolawawa 17'; Wahnawe 48', 75'

Stade PLGC, Nouméa
Referee: Anna-Marie Keighley (New Zealand)

29 August 2011
10:00

Papua New Guinea	8–0	American Samoa
Birum 1', 29'; Morris 29'; Letoi 45' (o.g.); Lanta 46'; Siniu 49'; Nori 77'; Midi 90+4'	Report

Stade PLGC, Nouméa
29 August 2011
15:00

Tahiti	0–0	New Caledonia
	Report

Stade PLGC, Nouméa
Referee: George Bruce (Vanuatu)

31 August 2011
11:00

New Caledonia	7–0	American Samoa
Wahnawe 12', 13', 32', 43', 56'; Maguire 19'; Pouye 78'	Report

Stade PLGC, Nouméa
Referee: Tupou Patia (Cook Islands)
31 August 2011
13:00

Tahiti	2–0	Solomon Islands
Hauata 45', 64'	Report

Stade PLGC, Nouméa
Referee: Anna-Marie Keighley (New Zealand)

2 September 2011
09:00

Solomon Islands	4–0	American Samoa
Samani 2', 4', 25'; Maenu'u 65'	Report

Stade PLGC, Nouméa
Referee: George Bruce (Vanuatu)
2 September 2011
15:00

New Caledonia	2–1	Papua New Guinea
Wahnawe 55'; Maguire 89'	Report	Morris 57'

Stade PLGC, Nouméa
Referee: Finau Vulivuli (Fiji)

5 September 2011
09:00

Tahiti	4–0	American Samoa
Frelin 20'; Alvarez 57'; Tokoragi 66'; Apo 72'	Report

Stade PLGC, Nouméa
Referee: Tupou Patia (Cook Islands)
5 September 2011
15:00

Solomon Islands	0–1	Papua New Guinea
	Report	Lanta 47'

Stade PLGC, Nouméa
Referee: Finau Vulivuli (Fiji)

=== Group B ===
Team	Pld	W	D	L	GF	GA	GD	Pts
Fiji	3	2	0	1	4	5	−1	6
Tonga	3	1	1	1	4	2	+2	4
Cook Islands	3	1	1	1	2	2	0	4
Guam	3	0	2	1	2	3	−1	2

31 August 2011
09:00

Cook Islands	1–1	Guam
D. Napa 90+1'	Report	Banks 76'

Stade PLGC, Nouméa
Referee: Finau Vulivuli (Fiji)
31 August 2011
15:00

Tonga	4–1	Fiji
Filo 50'; Va'enuku 70'; Si'i Manu 74' (pen.); Feke 90'	Report	Francis 11'

Stade PLGC, Nouméa
Referee: Chris Kerr (New Zealand)

2 September 2011
11:00

Guam	1–2	Fiji
Thompson 87' (pen.)	Report	Riwai 55'; Daini 72'

Stade PLGC, Nouméa
Referee: Tupou Patia (Cook Islands)
2 September 2011
13:00

Tonga	0–1	Cook Islands
	Report	Toka 26'

Stade PLGC, Nouméa
Referee: Anna-Marie Keighley (New Zealand)

5 September 2011
11:00

Tonga	0–0	Guam
	Report

Stade PLGC, Nouméa
Referee: Isidore Assiene-Ambassa (New Caledonia)
5 September 2011
13:00

Fiji	1–0	Cook Islands
Naivalulevu 6'	Report

Stade PLGC, Nouméa
Referee: Anna-Marie Keighley (New Zealand)

== Knockout stage ==
=== Bracket ===
Semi-finals
New Caledonia	3
Tonga	2
Papua New Guinea	4
Fiji	0

Final
New Caledonia	1
Papua New Guinea	2
Third place
Tonga	0
Fiji	1

=== Semi-finals ===
7 September 2011
09:00

New Caledonia	3–2	Tonga
Wahnawe 52', 59' (pen.), 90+4'	Report	Va'enuku 33', 72'

Stade Yoshida, Koné
Referee: Finau Vulivuli (Fiji)

7 September 2011
09:00

Papua New Guinea	4–0	Fiji
Morris 17'; Birum 76', 78', 81'	Report

Stade Hnassé, Lifou
Referee: Anna-Marie Keighley (New Zealand)

=== Third place game ===
9 September 2011
09:00

Tonga	0–1	Fiji
	Report	Singh 27'

Stade Boewa, Boulari
Referee: Anna-Marie Keighley (New Zealand)

=== Final ===
9 September 2011
17:00

New Caledonia	1–2	Papua New Guinea
Wahnawe 41'	Report	Midi 25'; Honeakii 90+2' (pen.)

Stade Numa Daly, Nouméa
Referee: Finau Vulivuli (Fiji)

== Goalscorers ==
12 goals

- (New Caledonia) Christelle Wahnawe

5 goals

- (Papua New Guinea) Sandra Birum

3 goals

- (Solomon Islands) Laydah Samani
- (Papua New Guinea) Rumona Morris
- (Tonga) Salome Va'enuku

2 goals

- (New Caledonia) Kim Maguire
- (Papua New Guinea) Miriam Lanta
- (Papua New Guinea) Ara Midi
- (French Polynesia) Mohea Hauata

1 goal

- (Cook Islands) Dayna Napa
- (Cook Islands) Tepaeru Toka
- (Fiji) Laijipa Daini
- (Fiji) Lota Francis
- (Fiji) Stella Naivalulevu
- (Fiji) Viniana Riwai
- (Fiji) Priya Singh
- (Guam) Jannel Banks
- (Guam) Kristin Thompson
- (New Caledonia) Marjorie Pouye
- (New Caledonia) Celine Xolawawa
- (Papua New Guinea) Miriam Louma
- (Papua New Guinea) Linah Honeakii
- (Papua New Guinea) Janie Nori
- (Papua New Guinea) Deslyn Siniu
- (Solomon Islands) Betty Maenu'u
- (French Polynesia) Heimiri Alvarez
- (French Polynesia) Tiere Apo
- (French Polynesia) Adriana Frelin
- (French Polynesia) Tihani Tokoragi
- (Tonga) Piuingi Feke
- (Tonga) Sofia Filo
- (Tonga) Laite Si'i Manu

Own goal

- (American Samoa) Fiso Letoi (playing against Papua New Guinea)

== See also ==
- Football at the 2011 Pacific Games – Men's tournament
- Pacific Games
