= Jotivini Tabua =

Fijian footballer

Personal information
- Date of birth: 25 January 1996 (age 30)
- Position: Defender

Team information
- Current team: Rewa

Senior career*
Years	Team	Apps	(Gls)
2021	Rewa	36	(39)

International career^{‡}
2019–	Fiji	4	(3)
- * Club domestic league appearances and goals ‡ National team caps and goals as of 18 July 2019

Jotivini Tabua (born 25 January 1996) is a Fijian footballer who plays as a defender for Labasa FC and captains the Fiji women's national team.

Tabua is from Raviravi.

In August 2018 she was named to the Fijian team for the 2018 OFC Women's Nations Cup. She captained the team at the 2019 Pacific Games in Apia.
