= Luisa Tamanitoakula =

Fijian footballer

Personal information
- Full name: Luisa Cagi Tamanitoakula
- Date of birth: 28 July 1998 (age 28)
- Position: Midfielder

Team information
- Current team: Ba

Senior career*
Years	Team	Apps	(Gls)
- Ba

International career^{‡}
2019–	Fiji	4	(2)
- * Club domestic league appearances and goals ‡ National team caps and goals as of 18 July 2019

Luisa Cagi Tamanitoakula (born on 28 July 1998) is a Fijian footballer who plays as a midfielder for Ba FC and the Fiji women's national team.

Tamanitoakula is from the village of Nailaga in Ba Province and was educated at AD Patel College. She works as a police officer.

She was selected for the national women's football team at the 2015 Pacific Games in Port Moresby. In July 2017 she was captain of the under-20 team at the 2017 Oceania Women Under-19 Championship, and won the golden ball at the tournament.

In August 2018 she was named to the Fijian team for the 2018 OFC Women's Nations Cup.

In December 2022 she announced a move into coaching.
