= Tahiti women's national football team =

Women's national association football team representing Tahiti

Tahiti
- Association: Tahitian Football Federation
- Confederation: OFC (Oceania)
- Head coach: Martin Pautu
- Most caps: Heimiri Alvarez (10)
- Top scorer: Heimiri Alvarez (4)
- FIFA code: TAH
First colours	Second colours

FIFA ranking
- Current: 123 ▼1 (16 June 2026)
- Highest: 79 (March 2009)
- Lowest: 123 (December 2025)

First international
- Tahiti 3–0 Vanuatu (Suva, Fiji; 2 July 2003)

Biggest win
- Kiribati 1–5 Tahiti (Nausori, Fiji; 9 July 2003); Samoa 0–4 Tahiti (Apia, Samoa; 30 August 2007); Tahiti 5–1 Vanuatu (Auckland, New Zealand; 1 October 2010); Tahiti 4–0 American Samoa (Nouméa, New Caledonia; 5 September 2011)

Biggest defeat
- Luxembourg 11–0 Tahiti (Molsheim, France; 19 February 2022)

OFC Women's Nations Cup
- Appearances: 4 (first in 2010)
- Best result: Quarter-finals (2022)

The Tahiti women's national football team (French: équipe de Tahiti féminine de football) or Vahine Ura represents French Polynesia in international women's football. The team is controlled by the Fédération Tahitienne de Football.

== Overview ==
In 2025, they participated in the 2025 OFC Women's Nations Cup, drawing two games and losing one in the Group Stage before losing to Vanuatu 0-1 in the fifth-place match. Later in November 2025, they participated in the first round of the OFC qualification for the 2027 FIFA Women's World Cup as one of the four lowest-ranked national teams in the OFC confederation. In the first round, they lost 0-1 to Cook Islands, ending their chance of participating in the 2027 FIFA Women's World Cup. Their last match of 2025 was a FIFA-sanctioned friendly against Tonga (which had lost 0-3 to American Samoa 3 days prior) in which they lost 1-4.

As of November 2025, Tahiti is ranked 123rd in the FIFA Women's World Ranking.

== Results and fixtures ==
The following is a list of match results in the last 12 months, as well as any future matches that have been scheduled.

Legend

Win Draw Lose Void or postponed Fixture

=== 2025 ===
28 November 2025 2027 FIFA Women's World Cup OFC Qualification	Tahiti	0-1	Cook Islands	Avarua, Cook Islands
15:00 UTC−10		Report (OFC)	Rouru 79'	Stadium: Cook Islands Football Academy (CIFA) Field (Field 1); Attendance: 300; Referee: Shama Maemae (Solomon Islands)

1 December 2025 Friendly	Tonga	4–1	Tahiti	Avarua, Cook Islands
16:00 UTC−10	McNeese 13', 52'; Moala 54'; T.Tonga 90'	Report (OFC)	Mai 9'	Stadium: Cook Islands Football Academy (CIFA) Field (Field 1); Referee: Torika Delai (Fiji)

== Coaching staff ==
As of 7 July 2025

Position	Name
Head coach	Xavier Samin

=== Manager history ===
- Martin Pautu(20??-202?)
- Xavier Samin(202?-present)

== Current squad ==
- The following players were named to the squad for the 2025 OFC Women's Nations Cup between 74 and 19 July 2025.

Caps and goals updated as of 12 July 2022, before the game against Papua New Guinea.

No.	Pos.	Player	Date of birth (age)	Club
1	GK	Gelimma El Hadj Kaddour	6 June 2005 (aged 20)	
3	DF	Tihiura Tahutini	9 January 2007 (aged 18)	
4	DF	Francesca Pagoubealo	19 September 1995 (aged 29)	
5	DF	Julienne Naomi	28 June 2003 (aged 22)	
6	MF	Vateanui Deane	3 November 1995 (aged 29)	(Tahitian Football Federation) A.S. Pirae
7	MF	Kohai Mai	14 February 2004 (aged 21)	(Tahitian Football Federation) A.S. Pirae
8	MF	Tevava Mai	4 May 1991 (aged 34)	
9	FW	Haranui Le Gayic	22 February 2007 (aged 18)	(Tahitian Football Federation) A.S. Tefana
11	FW	Heitiare Bonnet	4 July 1997 (aged 28)	
13	DF	Vahinetua Tuiho	28 December 2001 (aged 23)	
14	FW	Hereana Brothers	20 February 2007 (aged 18)	
15	FW	Tauhere Teore	15 November 2004 (aged 20)	(Tahitian Football Federation) A.S. Tefana
16	GK	Camille André	9 February 2003 (aged 22)	
17	FW	Kiani Wong	21 November 2000 (aged 24)	(French Football Federation) F.C.G. Bordeaux
18	DF	Rere-Ura Peu	5 June 1996 (aged 29)	
19	FW	Anavai Taaviri	30 September 2005 (aged 19)	
21	DF	Gwendoline Fournier (Captain)	16 April 1991 (aged 34)	(Tahitian Football Federation) A.S. Pirae
22	MF	Tiare-Hei Ahupu	10 July 2005 (aged 19)	
23	GK	Ameria Bea	31 August 2004 (aged 20)	

== Competitive record ==
=== OFC Women's Nations Cup ===
OFC Women's Nations Cup
Year	Result	GP	W	D*	L	GF	GA	GD
(New Caledonia) 1983	Did not enter							
(New Zealand) 1986	Did not enter							
(Australia) 1989	Did not enter							
(Australia) 1991	Did not enter							
(Papua New Guinea) 1994	Did not enter							
(New Zealand) 1998	Did not enter							
(Australia) 2003	Did not enter							
(Papua New Guinea) 2007	Did not enter							
(New Zealand) 2010	Group stage	3	1	0	2	5	9	−4
(Papua New Guinea) 2014	Did not enter							
(New Caledonia) 2018	Group stage	3	0	1	2	8	12	−4
(Fiji) 2022	Quarter-finals	3	0	1	2	1	3	−2
Total	3/12	9	1	2	6	14	24	−10

*Draws include knockout matches decided on penalty kicks.

=== Pacific Games ===
Pacific Games
Year	Result	Pld	W	D	L	GF	GA	GD
(Fiji) 2003	Fourth place	6	3	1	2	11	8	+3
(Samoa) 2007	Fourth place	5	2	1	2	6	6	0
(New Caledonia) 2011	Group stage	4	2	1	1	6	1	+5
(Papua New Guinea) 2015	Did not enter							
(Samoa) 2019	Group stage	4	1	1	2	1	6	−5
Total	Fourth place	19	8	4	7	24	21	+3

== See also ==
- Sport in Tahiti
  - Football in Tahiti
    - Women's football in Tahiti
- Tahiti men's national football team
