= Solomon Islands women's national football team =

Women's national association football team representing Solomon Islands

Solomon Islands
- Association: Solomon Islands Football Federation (SIFF)
- Confederation: OFC (Oceania)
- Head coach: Batram Suri
- Captain: Laydah Samani
- Most caps: Ileen Pegi (18)
- Top scorer: Ileen Pegi and Jemina David (7)
- Home stadium: Lawson Tama Stadium
- FIFA code: SOL
First colours	Second colours

FIFA ranking
- Current: 89 (16 June 2026)
- Highest: 73 (August 2025)
- Lowest: 120 (June 2022)

First international
- Papua New Guinea 6–1 Solomon Islands (Lae, Papua New Guinea; 9 April 2007)

Biggest win
- American Samoa 1–7 Solomon Islands (Apia, Samoa; 10 February 2024)

Biggest defeat
- Solomon Islands 1–11 New Zealand (Apia, Samoa; 19 February 2024)

OFC Women's Nations Cup
- Appearances: 4 (first in 2007)
- Best result: Champions (2025)

The Solomon Islands women's national football team represents Solomon Islands in international women's association football. The team is controlled by the Solomon Islands Football Federation (SIFF) and is affiliated to the Oceania Football Confederation (OFC). Their current head coach is the former footballer Timothy Inifiri.

Despite having not yet qualified for a FIFA Women's World Cup, the Solomon Islands finished fourth in the OFC Women's Nations Cup twice, in 2007 and 2010, and third in the 2022 OFC Women's Nations Cup. The team is one of the youngest national teams in Oceania, having played its first match in April 2007.

== History ==
Solomon Islands disputed its first game on 9 April 2007, for the eight OFC Women's Nations Cup, celebrated in their neighbour country Papua New Guinea. Their first rival was the host team, against whom the team lost 6–1. Prudence Fula became the Solomon Islands' first scorer ever. The nation finished last in the four-team tournament, after a heavy loss with New Zealand and a goalless tie against Tonga. Noel Wagapu coached the team, which consisted of former players of the under-17, under-19 and under-20 national teams.

With Timothy Infiri as the team's manager, the Solomon Islands did an average performance at the 2007 South Pacific Games football tournament in Apia, Samoa. There, the national team managed to achieve its first victory, 3–0 facing American Samoa. Unfortunately, they couldn't advance to the semi-finals due to two losses; with Fiji and Papua New Guinea.

Solomon Islands returned in the 2010 OFC Women's Championship, celebrated in New Zealand. The team was drawn in Group B, along with Papua New Guinea, Tonga and Fiji. The Solomon Islands qualified for the semi-finals after winning to Tonga and tying with Fiji. The team was beaten by the Football Ferns of New Zealand 8–0 in the semi-finals and 2–0 by the Cook Islands in the third-place match.

The team failed to past the group stage in the 2011 Pacific Games tournament. Solomon Islands only won over American Samoa 4–0 and lost the other three games. However, they managed to achieve their best result against Papua New Guinea, a narrow 1–0 loss.

The national team's most recent appearance was in the 2015 Pacific Games, after not entering the 2014 OFC Women's Nations Cup. Solomon Islands was defeated in all of its three matches.

== Recent History ==
In 2026, Solomon Islands will participate in the second round of the OFC qualification for the 2027 FIFA Women's World Cup. In the group stage, they will face American Samoa, Samoa, and New Zealand.

== Results and fixtures ==
The following is a list of match results in the last 12 months, as well as any future matches that have been scheduled.

Legend

Win Draw Loss Fixture

=== 2026 ===
27 February 2026 2027 FIFA Women's World Cup OFC Qualification	Solomon Islands	0–1	American Samoa	Honiara, Solomon Islands
17:00 UTC+11		Report (OFC); Report (FIFA)	Fuamatu-Ma'afala 56'	Stadium: National Stadium; Attendance: 300; Referee: Torika Delai (Fiji)

2 March 2026 2027 FIFA Women's World Cup qualification	New Zealand	8–0	Solomon Islands	Honiara, Solomon Islands
17:00 UTC+11	Clegg 2', 81'; Riley 8'; Blake 16', 65', 73'; Jale 61'; Vlok 75'	Report (FIFA)		Stadium: National Stadium; Attendance: 400; Referee: Gulshoda Saitkulova (Uzbekistan)

5 March 2026 2027 FIFA Women's World Cup OFC Qualification	Samoa	2–1	Solomon Islands	Honiara, Solomon Islands
17:00 UTC+11	Jessop 36'; Nari 78' (o.g.)	Report (OFC); Report (FIFA)	Pegi 63'	Stadium: National Stadium; Attendance: 400; Referee: Torika Delai (Fiji)

== Head-to-head record ==
As of 8 October 2021

Against	Pld	Won	Drawn	Lost	GF	GA	GD
American Samoa	2	2	0	0	7	0	+7
Cook Islands	2	0	1	1	1	3	−2
Fiji	2	0	1	1	0	3	−3
New Caledonia	2	0	0	2	1	11	−10
New Zealand	2	0	0	2	0	16	−16
Papua New Guinea	4	0	0	4	2	13	−11
Samoa	1	0	0	1	1	2	−1
Tahiti	1	0	0	1	0	2	−2
Tonga	3	1	1	1	4	2	+2
Total	19	3	3	33	16	52	−36

== Coaching staff ==
=== Current technical staff ===
As of 1 January 2026

Position	
Head coach	(Australia) Daniel Barrett
Assistant coach	(Solomon Islands) Crystal Bakolo
Team Manager	(Solomon Islands) Angelline Vave
Opposition Analyst	(Australia) Matthew Wearne

=== Manager history ===
- (Solomon Islands) Moses Toata
- (Solomon Islands) Batram Suri

== Players ==
=== Current squad ===
- The following players were named to the squad for the 2027 FIFA Women's World Cup qualification in Oceania region between 27 February and 5 March 2026.

Squad and ages as of 27 February 2026, the opening matchday of the second round of the 2027 FIFA Women's World Cup qualification in Oceania region.

No.	Pos.	Player	Date of birth (age)	Club
	GK	Zainab Donga	11 August 2000 (aged 25)	(Solomon Islands Football Federation) Naha FC
	GK	Margaret Kofela	17 August 1999 (aged 26)	(Solomon Islands Football Federation) RSIPF Royals
	GK	Rose Paia	28 July 2003 (aged 22)	(Solomon Islands Football Federation) Haura FC
	DF	Edith Nari	28 August 2003 (aged 22)	(Solomon Islands Football Federation) Henderson Eels
	DF	Jacklyn Ikama	25 May 1998 (aged 27)	(Solomon Islands Football Federation) Naha FC
	DF	Mesalyn Saepio	25 November 1991 (aged 34)	(Solomon Islands Football Federation) Frigates United
	DF	Lisa Solo	28 November 2003 (aged 22)	(Solomon Islands Football Federation) Koloale FC
	DF	Teisika Rotoava	28 January 2006 (aged 20)	
	DF	Naelyn Metake	7 March 2003 (aged 22)	(Solomon Islands Football Federation) RSIPF Royals
	DF	Bridget Alele	18 January 2004 (aged 22)	(Solomon Islands Football Federation) Naha FC
	DF	Claudia Votu	17 October 2000 (aged 25)	(Solomon Islands Football Federation) Haura FC
	DF	Ivy Sade	8 November 2000 (aged 25)	(Solomon Islands Football Federation) Haura FC
	MF	Alisha Donga	12 April 2002 (aged 23)	(Solomon Islands Football Federation) RSIPF Royals
	MF	Sherolyn Saeni	28 November 2000 (aged 25)	(Solomon Islands Football Federation) RSIPF Royals
	MF	Eileen Ama Lalawa	4 June 2001 (aged 24)	(Solomon Islands Football Federation) Naha FC
	MF	Sandy Aniholland	9 September 1991 (aged 34)	(Solomon Islands Football Federation) Solright
	MF	Almah Gogoni	28 December 2000 (aged 25)	(Solomon Islands Football Federation) Naha FC
	MF	Ileen Pegi	18 July 1992 (aged 33)	(Solomon Islands Football Federation) Koloale FC
	MF	Anna Ellen	28 November 2001 (aged 24)	(Solomon Islands Football Federation) RSIPF Royals
	MF	Rose Aba	3 September 2003 (aged 22)	(Solomon Islands Football Federation) RSIPF Royals
	MF	Gertrude Oritaimae	28 July 2007 (aged 18)	(Solomon Islands Football Federation) Henderson Eels
	FW	Lorina Solosaia	6 July 2002 (aged 23)	(Solomon Islands Football Federation) Henderson Eels
	FW	Joan Hanigaro	16 May 2001 (aged 24)	(Solomon Islands Football Federation) Henderson Eels

=== Recent call-ups ===
The following players have been called up for the team in the last 12 months.

Pos.	Player	Date of birth (age)	Caps	Goals	Club	Latest call-up

== Records ==
As of 8 October 2021

=== Top goalscorers ===
Rank	Player	Goals
1	Laydah Samani	6
2	Betty Maenu'u	2
2	Ileen Pegi	2
4	Cathy Aihunu	1
4	Crystal Annie	1
4	Margaret Daudau	1
4	Prudence Fula	1
4	Merina Joe	1
4	Diane Jusuts	1
4	Elsie Kwoaetolo	1
4	Ella Misibini	1
4	Mesalyn Saepio	1
Total		19

== All-time results ==
Win Draw Loss

No.	Opponent	Date	Result	Competition	Venue	Report
1	Papua New Guinea	9 April 2007	1–6	2007 OFC Women's Championship	Sir Ignatius Kilage Stadium, Lae (Papua New Guinea)	Report
2	New Zealand	11 April 2007	0–8	2007 OFC Women's Championship	Sir Ignatius Kilage Stadium, Lae (Papua New Guinea)	Report
3	Tonga	13 April 2007	0–0	2007 OFC Women's Championship	Sir Ignatius Kilage Stadium, Lae (Papua New Guinea)	Report
4	Papua New Guinea	28 August 2007	0–4	2007 South Pacific Games	Toleafoa J.S. Blatter Complex, Apia (Samoa)	Report
5	Cook Islands	30 August 2007	1–1	2007 South Pacific Games	Toleafoa J.S. Blatter Complex, Apia (Samoa)	Report
6	American Samoa	1 September 2007	3–0	2007 South Pacific Games	Toleafoa J.S. Blatter Complex, Apia (Samoa)	Report
7	Fiji	3 September 2007	0–3	2007 South Pacific Games	Toleafoa J.S. Blatter Complex, Apia (Samoa)	Report
8	Tonga	30 September 2010	4–0	2010 OFC Women's Championship	North Harbour Stadium, Auckland (New Zealand)	Report
9	Papua New Guinea	2 October 2010	1–2	2010 OFC Women's Championship	North Harbour Stadium, Auckland (New Zealand)	Report
10	Fiji	4 October 2010	0–0	2010 OFC Women's Championship	North Harbour Stadium, Auckland (New Zealand)	Report
11	New Zealand	6 October 2010	0–8	2010 OFC Women's Championship	North Harbour Stadium, Auckland (New Zealand)	Report
12	Cook Islands	8 October 2010	0–2	2010 OFC Women's Championship	North Harbour Stadium, Auckland (New Zealand)	Report
13	New Caledonia	27 August 2011	0–3	2011 Pacific Games	Stade PLGC, Nouméa (New Caledonia)	Report
14	Tahiti	31 August 2011	0–2	2011 Pacific Games	Stade PLGC, Nouméa (New Caledonia)	Report
15	American Samoa	2 September 2011	4–0	2011 Pacific Games	Stade PLGC, Nouméa (New Caledonia)	Report
16	Papua New Guinea	5 September 2011	0–1	2011 Pacific Games	Stade PLGC, Nouméa (New Caledonia)	Report
17	New Caledonia	6 July 2015	1–8	2015 Pacific Games	Bisini Sports Complex, Port Moresby (Papua New Guinea)	Report
18	Tonga	8 July 2015	0–2	2015 Pacific Games	Bisini Sports Complex, Port Moresby (Papua New Guinea)	Report
19	Samoa	11 July 2015	1–2	2015 Pacific Games	Bisini Sports Complex, Port Moresby (Papua New Guinea)	Report
20	Vanuatu	4 December 2017	0–5	2017 Pacific Mini Games	Port Vila Municipal Stadium, Port Vila (Vanuatu)	Report
21	Tonga	7 December 2017	1–3	2017 Pacific Mini Games	Port Vila Municipal Stadium, Port Vila (Vanuatu)	Report
22	Fiji	11 December 2017	0–2	2017 Pacific Mini Games	Port Vila Municipal Stadium, Port Vila (Vanuatu)	Report
23	Tonga	14 December 2017	0–1	2017 Pacific Mini Games	Port Vila Municipal Stadium, Port Vila (Vanuatu)	Report
24	American Samoa	24 August 2018	2–0	2018 OFC Women's Nations Cup qualification	Churchill Park, Lautoka (Fiji)	Report
25	Fiji	27 August 2018	0–0	2018 OFC Women's Nations Cup qualification	Churchill Park, Lautoka (Fiji)	Report
26	Vanuatu	30 August 2018	0–1	2018 OFC Women's Nations Cup qualification	Churchill Park, Lautoka (Fiji)	Report

== Competitive record ==
=== FIFA Women's World Cup ===
FIFA Women's World Cup									Qualification					
Year	Result	Position	Pld	W	D	L	GF	GA	Pld	W	D	L	GF	GA
(China) 1991	Did not enter													
(Sweden) 1995	Did not enter													
(United States) 1999	Did not enter													
(United States) 2003	Did not enter													
(China) 2007	Did not qualify								3	0	1	2	1	14
(Germany) 2011	Did not qualify								5	1	1	3	5	12
(Canada) 2015	Did not enter													
(France) 2019	Did not qualify								3	1	1	1	2	1
(Australia) (New Zealand) 2023	Did not qualify								5	1	3	1	6	7
(Brazil) 2027	To be determined								To be determined					
(Costa Rica) (Jamaica) (Mexico) (United States) 2031	To be determined								To be determined					
(United Kingdom) 2035	To be determined								To be determined					
Total	–	–	–	–	–	–	–	–	16	3	6	7	14	34

=== Olympic Games ===
Summer Olympics									Qualification					
Year	Result	Position	Pld	W	D	L	GF	GA	Pld	W	D	L	GF	GA
(United States) 1996	Ineligible								No qualifying process					
(Australia) 2000	Ineligible								No qualifying process					
(Greece) 2004	Did not enter													
(China) 2008	Did not qualify								4	1	1	2	4	8
(United Kingdom) 2012	Did not enter													
(Brazil) 2016	Did not qualify								3	0	0	3	2	12
(Japan) 2020	Did not qualify													
(France) 2024	Did not qualify													
Total	–	–	–	–	–	–	–	–	7	1	1	5	6	20

=== OFC Women's Nations Cup ===
OFC Women's Nations Cup									Qualification record					
Year	Result	Position	Pld	W	D	L	GF	GA	Pld	W	D	L	GF	GA
(New Caledonia) 1983	Did not enter								No qualification					
(New Zealand) 1986	Did not enter								No qualification					
(Australia) 1989	Did not enter								No qualification					
(Australia) 1991	Did not enter								No qualification					
(Papua New Guinea) 1994	Did not enter								No qualification					
(New Zealand) 1998	Did not enter								No qualification					
(Australia) 2003	Did not enter								No qualification					
(Papua New Guinea) 2007	Fourth place	4th	3	0	0	3	1	14	No qualification					
(New Zealand) 2010	Fourth place	4th	5	1	1	3	5	12	No qualification					
(Papua New Guinea) 2014	Did not enter								No qualification					
(New Caledonia) 2018	Did not qualify								3	1	1	1	2	1
(Fiji) 2022	Third place	3rd	5	1	3	1	6	7	No qualification					
(Fiji) 2025	Champions	1st	5	4	0	1	14	7	No qualification					
Total	Champions	4/12	18	6	4	8	26	40	3	1	1	1	2	1

=== Pacific Games ===
Pacific Games
Year	Result	Position	Pld	W	D	L	GF	GA
(Fiji) 2003	Did not enter							
(Samoa) 2007	Group stage	6th	4	1	1	2	4	8
(New Caledonia) 2011	Group stage	7th	4	1	0	3	4	6
(Papua New Guinea) 2015	Group stage	7th	3	0	0	3	2	12
(Samoa) 2019	Group stage	8th	4	1	0	3	5	9
(Solomon Islands) 2023	Group stage	6th	4	2	0	2		
Total	Group stage	5/6	19	5	1	13	10	26

=== Pacific Mini Games ===
Pacific Games
Year	Result	Pld	W	D	L	GF	GA	GD
(Vanuatu) 2017	Fourth Place	3	0	0	3	1	10	−9
Total	Fourth Place	3	0	0	3	1	10	−9

== See also ==
- Sport in Solomon Islands
  - Football in Solomon Islands
    - Women's football in Solomon Islands
- Solomon Islands men's national football team
