= Samoa women's national football team =

Women's national association football team representing Samoa

Samoa
- Association: Football Federation Samoa
- Confederation: OFC (Oceania)
- Head coach: Paul Ifill
- Top scorer: Torijan Lyne-Lewis (8)
- FIFA code: SAM

FIFA ranking
- Current: 87 ▼1 (16 June 2026)
- Highest: 86 (August 2025)
- Lowest: 115 (July 2019)

First international
- New Zealand 21–0 Samoa (Auckland, New Zealand; 9 October 1998)

Biggest win
- Samoa 5–0 Tonga (Apia, Samoa; 8 July 2019)

Biggest defeat
- New Zealand 21–0 Samoa (Auckland, New Zealand; 9 October 1998)

OFC Women's Nations Cup
- Appearances: 5 (first in 1998)
- Best result: Third place (2025)

The Samoa women's national football (Samoan: ʻau soka tamaʻitaʻi o Sāmoa) team represents Samoa in international women's football. The team is controlled by the Football Federation Samoa.

== History ==
The team contested the 2019 Pacific Games in Apia, winning silver.

The team topped Group A in the 2022 OFC Women's Nations Cup after defeating both Tonga and the Cook Islands.

In 2026, Samoa will participate in the second round of the OFC qualification for the 2027 FIFA Women's World Cup. In the group stage, they will face American Samoa, Solomon Islands, and New Zealand.

== Coaching staff ==
=== Current technical staff ===
As of 7 July 1, 2025

Position	
Head coach	(Barbados) Paul Ifill
Assistant coach	(United States) Erin Carrillo-Bautista
Team Manager	(New Zealand) Wendy Turton
Goal Keeper Coach	(New Zealand) Alex Britton
International Scout	(New Zealand) Alastair McLae
Opposition Scout	(England) Wyatt Burrows

=== Manager history ===
- Juan Chang Urrea(2023-)
- (Barbados) Paul Ifill

== Results and fixtures ==
The following is a list of match results in the last 12 months, as well as any future matches that have been scheduled.

Legend

Win Draw Lose Void or postponed Fixture

=== 2026 ===
27 February 2026 2027 FIFA Women's World Cup OFC Qualification	New Zealand	8-0	Samoa	Honiara, Solomon Islands
13:00 UTC+11		Report (FIFA)		Stadium: National Stadium

2 March 2026 2027 FIFA Women's World Cup OFC Qualification	American Samoa	1-0	Samoa	Honiara, Solomon Islands
13:00 UTC+11		Report (FIFA)		Stadium: National Stadium

5 March 2026 2027 FIFA Women's World Cup OFC Qualification	Samoa	2-1	Solomon Islands	Honiara, Solomon Islands
17:00 UTC+11		Report (FIFA)		Stadium: National Stadium

== Players ==
A player is eligible to represent Samoa if they have a Samoan parent or grandparent. In 2021 Samoa held trials in Auckland, New Zealand to identify players from the diaspora who could represent it. It also identified potential players in the United States and Europe. In 2022 the impact of the COVID-19 pandemic resulted in Samoa-based players being excluded in favour of diaspora players.

=== Current squad ===
- The following players were named to the squad for the 2027 FIFA Women's World Cup qualification (OFC) second round between 27 February and 7 March 2026.

No.	Pos.	Player	Date of birth (age)	Club
22	GK	Meripa Seumanutafa	11 December 2001 (aged 24)	(New Zealand Football) Papakura City
1	GK	Angelique Tuisamoa	28 November 2002 (aged 23)	(New Zealand Football) Western Springs AFC
2	DF	Tielua Baptista	12 April 2007 (aged 18)	(United States Soccer Federation) Angelo State Rams
4	DF	Shylah Balla-Ateli	3 June 2007 (aged 18)	(Football Australia) Heidelberg United
14	DF	Mia Afoa	11 February 2009 (aged 17)	(Football Australia) Olympic FC
11	DF	Breanna Kitiona	9 January 2009 (aged 17)	{{{club}}}
18	DF	Alisa Tuatagaloa (Captain)	5 August 2001 (aged 24)	{{{club}}}
19	DF	Georgia Aiesi	29 January 2002 (aged 24)	(Football Australia) Mandurah City
8	MF	Malia Jessop	6 April 2007 (aged 18)	(United States Soccer Federation) Utah Valley Wolverines
	MF	Jaedeci Uluvili	6 February 2001 (aged 25)	(New Zealand Football) Western Springs AFC
9	MF	Torijan Lyne-Lewis	4 February 1994 (aged 32)	{{{club}}}
15	MF	Faith Lilii-Moa	3 February 2004 (aged 22)	(United States Soccer Federation) Virginia Cavaliers
17	MF	Tamani Skeers	17 December 2008 (aged 17)	(Football Australia) Eastern Suburbs United FC
7	MF	Arianna Skeers	20 July 2006 (aged 19)	(Football Australia) Eastern Suburbs United FC
10	MF	Aiyana Fernandez	26 July 2008 (aged 17)	(Football Australia) Sydney Olympic FC
3	MF	Khelister Murray-Kumitau	26 August 2003 (aged 22)	(Football Australia) Wynnum Wolves
5	FW	Oteta Kitiona	30 May 2005 (aged 20)	(United States Soccer Federation) BC Bulldogs
16	FW	Kennedy Corkin	5 May 2005 (aged 20)	{{{club}}}

=== Recent call-ups ===
The following players have been called up for the team in the last 12 months.

Pos.	Player	Date of birth (age)	Caps	Goals	Club	Latest call-up

== Competitive record ==
=== FIFA Women's World Cup ===
FIFA Women's World Cup
Year	Result	GP	W	D*	L	GF	GA	GD
(China) 1991	did not exist							
(Sweden) 1995	did not exist							
(United States) 1999	did not qualify							
(United States) 2003	did not qualify							
(China) 2007	did not enter							
(Germany) 2011	did not enter							
(Canada) 2015	did not enter							
(France) 2019	did not qualify							
(Australia) (New Zealand) 2023	did not qualify							
(Brazil) 2027	did not qualify							
(Costa Rica) (Jamaica) (Mexico) (United States) 2031	to be determined							
(United Kingdom) 2035	to be determined							
Total	0/12	–	–	–	–	–	–	–

*Draws include knockout matches decided on penalty kicks.

=== OFC Women's Nations Cup ===
OFC Women's Nations Cup
Year	Result	GP	W	D*	L	GF	GA
(New Caledonia) 1983	Did not enter						
(New Zealand) 1986	Did not enter						
(Australia) 1989	Did not enter						
(Australia) 1991	Did not enter						
(Papua New Guinea) 1994	Did not enter						
(New Zealand) 1998	Group stage	2	0	0	2	0	26
(Australia) 2003	Fourth place	4	1	0	3	3	39
(Papua New Guinea) 2007	Did not enter						
(New Zealand) 2010	Did not enter						
(Papua New Guinea) 2014	Did not enter						
(New Caledonia) 2018	Group stage	3	0	1	2	5	12
(Fiji) 2022	Fourth place	5	3	1	1	8	6
(Fiji) 2025	Third place	5	3	0	2	10	5
Total	5/13	19	7	2	10	26	88

*Draws include knockout matches decided on penalty kicks.

=== Pacific Games ===
Pacific Games
Year	Result	Pld	W	D	L	GF	GA	GD
(Fiji) 2003	Did not enter							
(Samoa) 2007	Group Stage	3	1	1	1	2	4	−2
(New Caledonia) 2011	Did not enter							
(Papua New Guinea) 2015	Fourth Place	5	2	1	2	5	8	−3
(Samoa) 2019	Second Place	5	3	1	1	10	5	+5
(Solomon Islands) 2023	Fourth Place	4	2	0	2	9	11	−2
Total	Second Place	17	8	3	6	26	28	−2

== See also ==
- Sport in Samoa
  - Football in Samoa
    - Women's football in Samoa
- Samoa women's national under-20 football team
- Samoa women's national under-17 football team
- Samoa women's national futsal team
- Samoa women's national under-18 futsal team
- Samoa men's national football team
