= Fiji women's national football team =

Women's national association football team representing Fiji

Fiji
- Nickname: Kulas
- Association: Fiji Football Association
- Head coach: Nicola Demaine
- Most caps: Cema Nasau (30)
- Top scorer: Cema Nasau (35)
- FIFA code: FIJ

FIFA ranking
- Current: 80 ▼1 (16 June 2026)
- Highest: 64 (December 2020)
- Lowest: 85 (November 2010; September 2015)

First international
- New Caledonia 2–0 Fiji (New Caledonia; 28 November 1983)

Biggest win
- Tonga 0–12 Fiji (Nouméa, New Caledonia; 22 November 2018)

Biggest defeat
- Australia 17–0 Fiji (New Zealand; 15 October 1998)

World Cup
- Appearances: 0

OFC Women's Nations Cup
- Appearances: 6 (first in 1983)
- Best result: Runners-up (2018, 2022)

Summer Olympics
- Appearances: 0

The Fiji women's national football team (Fijian: timi ni soka ni marama ni Viti) represents Fiji in international women's football. The team is controlled by the Fiji Football Association.

== Results and fixtures ==
The following is a list of match results in the last 12 months, as well as any future matches that have been scheduled.

Legend

Win Draw Lose Void or postponed Fixture

=== 2026 ===
27 February 2026 2027 FIFA Women's World Cup OFC Qualification	Fiji	5–0	New Caledonia	Ba, Fiji
16:00 UTC+12	Davis 11'; Diyalowai 28', 45+4'; Nasau 36'; Alfred 75'	Report (OFC); Report (FIFA)		Stadium: Govind Park; Attendance: 150; Referee: Sarah Jones (New Zealand)

5 March 2026 2027 FIFA Women's World Cup OFC Qualification	Vanuatu	0–1	Fiji	Ba, Fiji
16:00 UTC+12		Report (OFC); Report (FIFA)	Diyalowai 20'	Stadium: Govind Park; Attendance: 150; Referee: Sarah Jones (New Zealand)

8 March 2026 2027 FIFA Women's World Cup OFC Qualification	Papua New Guinea	1–0	Fiji	Ba, Fiji
12:00 UTC+12	M. Gunemba 86'	Report (OFC); Report (FIFA)		Stadium: Govind Park; Attendance: 150; Referee: Beth Rattray (New Zealand)

11 April 2026 2027 FIFA Women's World Cup qualification	New Zealand	5–0	Fiji	Hamilton, New Zealand
16:10 UTC+12	Brown 11'; Taylor 21'; Foster 27'; Kitching 38'; Blake 74'	Report (FIFA)		Stadium: FMG Stadium Waikato; Attendance: 3,267; Referee: Shama Maemae (Solomon Islands)

3 June Closed Door Friendly	Hong Kong	3–2	Fiji	Tseung Kwan O, Hong Kong
--:-- UTC+8	Chan Yee Hing 10'; Li Hau Yi 50'; Leung Kwong Kit 60'	Report	Leba 70'; Tabunase 80'	Stadium: Jockey Club HKFA Football Training Centre; Attendance: 0

6 June Friendly	Hong Kong	3–1	Fiji	Kowloon, Hong Kong
18:00 UTC+8	Cheung Wai Ki 34'; Leung H.K. 39'; Wei Lan 75'	Report	Naweni 23'	Stadium: Kai Tak Youth Sports Ground; Attendance: 1,261

== Coaching staff ==
As of 8 March 2026

Position	Name
Head coach	(England) Nicola Demaine
Assistant coach	(Fiji) Annette Nainima
Physiotherapist	(Fiji) Archana Karan
Team manager	(Fiji) Tulia Tuidama

=== Manager history ===
- (United States) Lisa Cole (2021–2023)
- (Singapore) Angeline Chua (2023–2025)
- (England) Nicola Demaine (2026–)

== Team ==
=== Current squad ===
- The following players were named to the squad for the 2025 OFC Women's Nations Cup between 7–19 July 2025.

Caps and goals updated as of 12 July before the game against the Solomon Islands.

No.	Pos.	Player	Date of birth (age)	Club
1	GK	Mereoni Tinaimakubuna	10 July 1992 (aged 32)	(Fiji Football Association) Rewa
20	GK	Emily Esposito	20 January 2007 (aged 18)	(Fiji Football Association) Rewa
22	GK	Ka'iulani Scott	29 October 2007 (aged 17)	(New Zealand Football) Eastern Suburbs
2	DF	Filomena Racea	4 September 2001 (aged 23)	(Fiji Football Association) Rewa
4	DF	Naomi Waqanidrola	9 July 1993 (aged 31)	(Fiji Football Association) Rewa
5	DF	Maria Veronika	14 April 1999 (aged 26)	(Papua New Guinea Football Association) Hekari United
10	DF	Pijila Kilaiwaca	27 December 2005 (aged 19)	(Fiji Football Association) Rewa
14	DF	Mereoni Tora	26 October 1998 (aged 26)	(Fiji Football Association) Ba
16	DF	Caroline Qalivere	8 March 2007 (aged 18)	(Fiji Football Association) Lautoka
18	DF	Ema Mereia	29 October 2006 (aged 18)	(Fiji Football Association) Labasa
19	DF	Sereana Naweni	3 October 2006 (aged 18)	(Fiji Football Association) Ba
21	DF	Akanisi Sorovakarua	23 June 2005 (aged 20)	(United States Soccer Federation) West LA College
3	MF	Adi Litia Bakaniceva	9 March 2004 (aged 21)	(Papua New Guinea Football Association) Hekari United
6	MF	Cema Nasau	15 November 1999 (aged 25)	(New Zealand Football) Eastern Suburbs
11	MF	Jotivini Tabua	25 January 1996 (aged 29)	(Fiji Football Association) Rewa
12	MF	Preeya Singh	19 August 2004 (aged 20)	(United States Soccer Federation) UC Merced
13	MF	Elesi Tabunase	12 August 2008 (aged 16)	(Fiji Football Association) Ba
23	MF	Anisha Dwarka	4 November 2006 (aged 18)	(United States Soccer Federation) Jessup University
7	FW	Koleta Likuculacula	17 August 2000 (aged 24)	(Fiji Football Association) Ba
8	FW	Narieta Leba	18 August 2004 (aged 20)	(Fiji Football Association) Suva
9	FW	Trina Davis	6 September 2001 (aged 23)	(United States Soccer Federation) FC Olympia
15	FW	Kasanita Taufa Tabua	28 May 2007 (aged 18)	(Fiji Football Association) Rewa
17	FW	Adi Reva	23 November 2010 (aged 14)	(Fiji Football Association) Ba

=== Recent call-ups ===
The following players have been called up for the team in the last 12 months.

Pos.	Player	Date of birth (age)	Caps	Goals	Club	Latest call-up

== Competitive record ==
=== FIFA Women's World Cup ===
FIFA Women's World Cup
Year	Result	GP	W	D*	L	GF	GA	GD
(China) 1991	did not qualify							
(Sweden) 1995	did not qualify							
(United States) 1999	did not qualify							
(United States) 2003	did not qualify							
(China) 2007	did not qualify							
(Germany) 2011	did not qualify							
(Canada) 2015	did not qualify							
(France) 2019	did not qualify							
(Australia) (New Zealand) 2023	did not qualify							
(Brazil) 2027	did not qualify							
(Costa Rica) (Jamaica) (Mexico) (United States) 2031	to be determined							
(United Kingdom) 2035	to be determined							
Total	0/10	–	–	–	–	–	–	–

*Draws include knockout matches decided on penalty kicks.

=== OFC Women's Nations Cup ===
OFC Women's Nations Cup									Qualification record					
Year	Result	GP	W	D*	L	GF	GA	GD	GP	W	D	L	GF	GA
(New Caledonia) 1983	Fourth place	3	0	0	3	1	30	−29	No qualification					
(New Zealand) 1986	did not enter								No qualification					
(Australia) 1989	did not enter								No qualification					
(Australia) 1991	did not enter								No qualification					
(Papua New Guinea) 1994	did not enter								No qualification					
(New Zealand) 1998	Fourth place	4	1	0	3	6	38	−32	No qualification					
(Australia) 2003	did not enter								No qualification					
(Papua New Guinea) 2007	did not enter								No qualification					
(New Zealand) 2010	Group stage	3	0	1	2	1	5	−4	No qualification					
(Papua New Guinea) 2014	did not enter								No qualification					
(New Caledonia) 2018	Runners-up	5	3	0	2	20	19	+1	3	2	1	0	7	1
(Fiji) 2022	Runners-up	5	3	1	1	10	5	+5	No qualification					
(Fiji) 2025	Fourth place	5	2	0	3	7	7	0	No qualification					
Total	6/13	25	9	2	14	45	104	−59	3	2	1	0	7	1

*Draws include knockout matches decided on penalty kicks.

=== Pacific Games ===
Pacific Games
Year	Result	Pld	W	D	L	GF	GA	GD
(Fiji) 2003	Fifth place	6	3	1	2	11	8	+3
(Samoa) 2007	Third place	6	5	0	1	12	2	+10
(New Caledonia) 2011	Third place	5	3	0	2	5	9	−4
(Papua New Guinea) 2015	Group stage	2	0	1	1	2	6	−4
(Samoa) 2019	Third place	5	4	0	1	21	3	+18
(Solomon Islands) 2023	Second Place	4	3	0	1	11	7	+4
Total	Second place	28	18	2	8	62	35	+27

=== Pacific Mini Games ===
Pacific Games
Year	Result	Pld	W	D	L	GF	GA	GD
(Vanuatu) 2017	Champions	3	2	1	0	7	0	+7
Total	Champions	3	2	1	0	7	0	+7

== See also ==
- Sport in Fiji
  - Football in Fiji
    - Women's football in Fiji
- Fiji men's national football team
