= Football at the 2023 Pacific Games – Women's team squads =

The 2023 Pacific Games women's football tournament is an international football tournament held in the Solomon Islands from 17 November – 2 December 2023.

The age listed for each player is their age on the first day of the tournament, 17 November 2023.

== Group A ==
=== Papua New Guinea ===
Head coach: (Papua New Guinea) Frederica Siwin-Sakette

No.	Pos.	Player	Date of birth (age)	Caps	Goals	Club
1	GK	Faith Kasiray	20 December 1999 (age 26)	6	0	(Papua New Guinea Football Association) POM
	DF	Anashtasia Gunemba				
5	DF	Olivia Upaupa	6 June 1992 (age 33)	30	9	(Papua New Guinea Football Association) Lae
	DF	Serah Waida				
	DF	Georgina Bakani				
	DF	Michaelyne Butubu				
2	DF	Lavinia Hola	22 March 1999 (age 27)	5	0	(Papua New Guinea Football Association) POM
20	DF	Gloria Laeli	25 March 1997 (age 29)	2	0	(Papua New Guinea Football Association) POM
16	MF	Rumona Morris	5 June 1993 (age 32)	2	0	(Papua New Guinea Football Association) POM
	MF	Ramona Padio				
	MF	Phylis Pala				
	FW	Calista Maneo				
	FW	Marie Kaipu				
	FW	Nenny Elipas				
		Christie Maneu				
		Mavis Singara				
		Merolyne Sali				
		Arnolda Dou				
		Ginnimarie Wambi				
		Glories Miag				
		Mayah Samai				
		Fidorah Namuesh				
		Grace Batiy				

=== New Caledonia ===
Head coach : GILLES GARCIA

No.	Pos.	Player	Date of birth (age)	Caps	Goals	Club
23	GK	Debora Selefen	6 October 2000 (age 25)	0	0	(New Caledonian Football Federation) Païta
		Lorenza Hnamano				
5	DF	Claire Kaemo	27 April 1993 (age 33)	9	0	(New Caledonian Football Federation) Lössi
	DF	Madeleine Jaine				
	DF	Laurenda Simane				
	DF	Marthe Katrawa				
	MF	Alice Wenessia				
		Melissa Iekawe				
		Edsy Matao				
		Nassaie Ihage				
		Ronaldine Hnaune				
		Julia Honakoko				
		Jennel Ligneul				
		Océanne Elineau				
		Louise Luepak				
		Germaine Pouye				
		Anais Konhu				
		Marie-Laure Palenne				
		Waohma Ujicas				
		Cecilia Waheo				
		Henako Wahnawe				

=== Cook Islands ===
Head coach: (Cook Islands) Tuka Tisam

No.	Pos.	Player	Date of birth (age)	Caps	Goals	Club
20	GK	Kimberley Uini	23 August 2006 (age 19)	0	0	(Cook Islands Football Association) Matavera Ngatangiia
1	GK	Kimberly Philip				
22	DF	Teretia Teinaki	23 January 2002 (age 24)	8	0	(New Zealand Football) Manukau United
24	DF	Tia Strickland	17 September 2005 (age 20)	0	0	(Cook Islands Football Association) Tupapa Maraerenga
17	DF	Tanga Morris	28 November 1996 (age 29)	0	0	(Cook Islands Football Association) Matavera Ngatangiia
4	DF	Tasha Dean	23 February 1994 (age 32)	5	0	(Cook Islands Football Association) Puaikura
15	FW	Ngamata Moekaa	24 May 2002 (age 23)	0	0	(New Zealand Football) Manukau United
11	FW	Kayleena Kermode	8 February 1999 (age 27)	0	0	(Cook Islands Football Association) Tupapa Maraerenga
6	FW	Victoria Fatiaki	13 January 2005 (age 21)	0	0	(Cook Islands Football Association) Puaikura
		Debora Mataio				(Cook Islands Football Association)
		Te Upoko Tuariki				(Cook Islands Football Association)
		Tearoa Rouru				(Cook Islands Football Association)
		Caitlin Young				(Cook Islands Football Association)
		Susan Williams				(Cook Islands Football Association)
		Matilda Auua				(Cook Islands Football Association)
		Sarah Enoka				(Cook Islands Football Association)
		Maureen Fitzapatrick				(Cook Islands Football Association)
		Mii Savage				(Cook Islands Football Association)
		Kataraina Piri				(Cook Islands Football Association)

=== American Samoa ===
Head coach : (American Samoa) Tunoa Lui

No.	Pos.	Player	Date of birth (age)	Caps	Goals	Club
	GK	Destiny Kapisi				
	GK	Maria Iolama				
2	DF	Olivia Vaiomounga	February 12, 2001 (age 25)	4	0	(Football Federation American Samoa) Pago Youth
14	DF	Veronica Iupati	August 25, 2003 (age 22)	1	0	(Football Federation American Samoa) Ilaoa and To'omata
20	DF	Pisita Lui	September 29, 2004 (age 21)	0	0	(Football Federation American Samoa) Lion Heart
13	MF	Ama Faleao	February 28, 2003 (age 23)	1	0	(Football Federation American Samoa) Ilaoa and To'omata
	MF	Oloa Tofaeono	November 17, 2002 (age 23)	1	0	(Football Federation American Samoa) Vaiala Tongan
10	MF	Elcy Lui	June 19, 2002 (age 23)	7	0	(Football Federation American Samoa) Lion Heart
7	FW	Lela Waetin	November 28, 2003 (age 22)	4	0	(Football Federation American Samoa) Ilaoa and To'omata
	FW	Ama Faleao				
		Zeporah Talo				
		Nette Liu				
		Ashley Fonoti				
		Meleane Ioapo				
		Olita Ara				
		Gracious Toilolo				
		Selita Woo Chinhg				
		Heavenly Faoa-Danielson				
		Tia Nash-Cummings				

== Group B ==
=== Tahiti ===
Head coach: Martin Pautu

No.	Pos.	Player	Date of birth (age)	Caps	Goals	Club
1	GK	Gelimma El Hadj Kaddour	6 June 2005 (age 20)	0	0	(Tahitian Football Federation) Dragon
5	DF	Julienne Naomi	28 June 2003 (age 22)	0	0	(Tahitian Football Federation) AS Jeunesse Marquisienne
21	DF	Gwendoline Fournier	16 April 1991 (age 35)	4	0	(Tahitian Football Federation) AS Jeunesse Marquisienne
7	MF	Kohai Mai	14 April 2004 (age 22)	0	0	(Tahitian Football Federation) Dragon
	MF	Teatarii Maraetefau	24 March 1998 (age 28)	2	0	(Tahitian Football Federation) Jeunes Tahitiens
	MF	Vahuariki Tufaunui	5 September 2002 (age 23)	2	0	(Tahitian Football Federation) Tefana
17	MF	Kiani Wong	21 November 2000 (age 25)	7	0	(French Football Federation) Lens
		Tihiura Tahutini				
		Keani Hamblin				
		Prisca Allaguy-Sallachy				
		Temanava Fournier				
		Vaimatea Tauihara				
		Esperance Manutahi				
		Vaihei Samin				
		Haranui Legayic				
		Ruarau Vallet				
		Poroni Voirin				
		Cheyenne Teore				
		Oferina Taerea				
		Hanavai Teupooteharuru				

=== Samoa ===
Head coach :Juan Chang Urrea

No.	Pos.	Player	Date of birth (age)	Caps	Goals	Club
13	GK	Angelique Tuisamoa	3 March 2000 (age 26)	2	0	(New Zealand Football) Western Springs AFC
3	DF	Alisa Tuatagaloa	8 May 2001 (age 25)	5	0	(New Zealand Football) Three Kings United
6	DF	Faith Lilli Moa	3 February 2004 (age 22)	5	0	(New Zealand Football) Ellerslie AFC
11	DF	Shontelle Stevens	10 September 1995 (age 30)	5	0	(New Zealand Football) Manukau United
12	MF	Lianna Soifua	6 September 2000 (age 25)	5	0	(United States Soccer Federation) Unattached
21	MF	Sariah Taeoalii	5 July 2006 (age 19)	4	0	(United States Soccer Federation) Murray Soccer Club
4	MF	Jaedeci Uluvii	2 June 2001 (age 24)	5	0	(New Zealand Football) Western Springs AFC
20	MF	Paige Mccloskey	26 January 1999 (age 27)	3	0	(New Zealand Football) Lakes FC
7	MF	Iole Avenoso	27 January 1996 (age 30)	4	0	(Football Australia) Brunswick City
9	FW	Torijan Lyne-Lewis	15 June 1995 (age 30)	4	0	(New Zealand Football) Wairarapa United
10	FW	Jayda Stewart	8 March 2002 (age 24)	5	5	(New Zealand Football) Coastal Spirit
		Arianna Skeers				
		Sasjah Vikolia Dade				
		Lilly Dowsing				
		Leiloa Fesolai				
		Eve Stuart				
		Shylah Balla-Ateli				
		Grace Taeoalii				
		Faaitaita Iakopo				

=== Tonga ===
Head coach: (Tonga) Mark 'Uhatahi

No.	Pos.	Player	Date of birth (age)	Caps	Goals	Club
1	GK	Meleana Taufa	27 November 2001 (age 24)	0	0	(Tonga Football Association) Veitongo
	GK	Kalolaine Topui				
20	GK	Madison Tenifa	17 April 2004 (age 22)	0	0	(Tonga Football Association) Fasi mo e Afi
	GK	Tautala Tupoumalohi				
4	DF	Ana Lauteau	6 August 2002 (age 23)	1	0	(Tonga Football Association) Veitongo
	DF	Lavinia Afu				
7	DF	Mele Kafa	20 January 2002 (age 24)	11	3	(Tonga Football Association) Nukuhetulu
	DF	Melaia Polovili				
	MF	Seini Lutu				
17	MF	Kiana Swift	14 September 2000 (age 25)	0	0	(Canadian Soccer Association) Victoria Highlanders
12	MF	Lositika Feke	11 April 2003 (age 23)	3	0	(Tonga Football Association) Longolongo
14	MF	Siunupa Talasinga	11 April 2002 (age 24)	3	0	(Tonga Football Association) Veitongo
	MF	Latusiu Lomu				
	MF	Ana Talasinga				
	MF	Loma Mcneese				
15	FW	Alexandra Fifita	4 October 1999 (age 26)	0	0	(Tonga Football Association) Fasi mo e Afi
11	FW	Jazmine Loto'aniu	13 July 1999 (age 26)	0	0	(Football Australia) Castle Hill United
6	FW	Ana Polovili	4 March 2002 (age 24)	2	0	(Tonga Football Association) Veitongo
	FW	Sachi Swift				
	FW	Tama’a Faletau				

== Group C ==
=== Fiji ===
Head coach: (Singapore) Angeline Chua

No.	Pos.	Player	Date of birth (age)	Caps	Goals	Club
1	GK	Selai Tikosuva				(Fiji Football Association)
20	GK	Mereseini Waqali	21 April 2004 (age 22)	0	0	(Fiji Football Association)
	DF	Naomi Waqanidrola				(Fiji Football Association)
	DF	Seruwaia Lalauba				(Fiji Football Association)
	DF	Sereana Naweni				(Fiji Football Association)
14	DF	Unaisi Tuberi	9 September 1994 (age 31)	0	0	(Fiji Football Association)
11	DF	Jotivini Tabua	25 January 1996 (age 30)	20	5	(Fiji Football Association)
19	DF	Angeline Rekha	29 September 2004 (age 21)	0	0	(Fiji Football Association)
8	DF	Aliza Hussein	23 July 2000 (age 25)	2	0	(Fiji Football Association)
2	DF	Filomena Racea	4 September 2001 (age 24)	0	0	(Fiji Football Association)
	DF	Ema Mareia				(Fiji Football Association)
	DF	Asela Cokanisga				(Fiji Football Association)
16	MF	Sofi Diyalowai	14 October 1993 (age 32)	23	5	(Fiji Football Association)
3	MF	Adi Bakaniceva	9 March 2004 (age 22)	5	2	(Fiji Football Association)
3	MF	Louisa Simmons				(Fiji Football Association)
6	MF	Cema Nasau	15 November 1999 (age 26)	18	19	(Fiji Football Association)
26	MF	Imeri Nai	17 March 2002 (age 24)	0	0	(Fiji Football Association)
15	MF	Shayal Sindhika	3 December 1993 (age 32)	0	0	(Fiji Football Association)
9	FW	Trina Davis	6 September 2001 (age 24)	7	9	(Puerto Rican Football Federation) Puerto Rico Sol
7	FW	Sonia Alfred				(Fiji Football Association)
25	FW	Vanisha Kumar	6 February 1995 (age 31)	3	0	(Fiji Football Association)
18	FW	Narieta Leba	18 August 2004 (age 21)	0	0	(Fiji Football Association)
10	FW	Luisa Tamanitoakula	28 July 1998 (age 27)	20	14	(Fiji Football Association)

=== Vanuatu ===
Head coach : Jean Robert Yelou

No.	Pos.	Player	Date of birth (age)	Caps	Goals	Club
	GK	Amelia Ready				
21	GK	Vanissa Wilson	3 May 1993 (age 33)	0	0	(Vanuatu Football Federation) ABM Galaxy
3	DF	Jesta Toka	12 September 1997 (age 28)	5	0	(Vanuatu Football Federation) Malampa
6	MF	Jane Alatoa	14 April 1999 (age 27)	12	3	(Vanuatu Football Federation) Benben United
8	MF	Emilia Taravaki	15 June 1999 (age 26)	11	1	(Vanuatu Football Federation) Ifira Black Bird
7	MF	Rita Solomon	29 March 2001 (age 25)	6	0	(Vanuatu Football Federation)
12	MF	Nettie Kalsau	20 February 2001 (age 25)	4	0	(Vanuatu Football Federation)
10	FW	Annie Rose Gere	31 January 2001 (age 25)	9	3	(Vanuatu Football Federation) Benben United
9	FW	Cynthia Ngwele	21 September 2001 (age 24)	3	0	(Vanuatu Football Federation)
		Nelly Kaltack				
		Limas Erikan				
		Diana Sine				
		Leimata Simon				
		Florida Willy				
		Elma Aiviji				
		Selena Poida				
		Rinneth Siri				
		Noeline Erikan				
		Noella Metoriki				

=== Solomon Islands ===
Head coach: Batram Suri

No.	Pos.	Player	Date of birth (age)	Caps	Goals	Club
21	GK	Sylvester Maenu'u	8 October 1993 (age 32)	3	0	(Solomon Islands Football Federation) Koloale
1	GK	Margaret Kofela	17 August 1999 (age 26)	4	0	(Solomon Islands Football Federation) RSIPF Royals
12	GK	Corrina Rotoava	7 August 1998 (age 27)	0	0	(Solomon Islands Football Federation) Frigates United
	DF	Juan Hanigard				
14	DF	Sharoly Saeni	25 January 2003 (age 23)	0	0	(Solomon Islands Football Federation) RSIPF Royals
15	DF	Edith Nari	28 August 2003 (age 22)	10	0	(Solomon Islands Football Federation) Solright
17	DF	Jacklyn Ikama	25 May 1998 (age 27)	0	0	(Solomon Islands Football Federation) Naha
	DF	Lisa Solo				
	DF	Reslyn Solo				
25	DF	Delmay Waihaho	27 August 1996 (age 29)	0	0	(Solomon Islands Football Federation) Solright
3	DF	Claudia Votu	17 October 2000 (age 25)	0	0	(Solomon Islands Football Federation) Haura
6	MF	Mesalyn Saepio	25 November 1991 (age 34)	10	1	(Solomon Islands Football Federation) Koloale
	MF	Madeline Arukau				
	MF	Veronica Tolivaka				
7	MF	Almah Gogoni	28 December 2000 (age 25)	0	0	(Solomon Islands Football Federation) Naha
18	MF	Alisha Donga	12 April 2002 (age 24)	1	0	(Solomon Islands Football Federation) RSIPF Royals
8	MF	Sandy Aniholland	9 September 1991 (age 34)	0	0	(Solomon Islands Football Federation) Solright
	MF	Merlin Tabius				
	MF	Ivy Sade				
19	MF	Sandra Wale	11 September 2003 (age 22)	0	0	(Solomon Islands Football Federation) RSIPF Royals
9	FW	Jemina David	4 December 1994 (age 31)	7	1	(Solomon Islands Football Federation) Frigates United
11	FW	Ileen Pegi	18 July 1992 (age 33)	18	3	(Solomon Islands Football Federation) Koloale
20	FW	Lorina Solosaia	6 July 2002 (age 23)	0	0	(Solomon Islands Football Federation) Frigates United
