= 2025 OFC Women's Nations Cup squads =

The 2025 OFC Women's Nations Cup was an international football tournament held in Fiji from 4 to 19 July 2025. The eight national teams involved in the tournament were required to register a squad of 23 players, including three goalkeepers. Only players in these squads were eligible to take part in the tournament.

The position listed for each player is per the official squad list published by the OFC. The age listed for each player is on 4 July 2025, the first day of the tournament. The numbers of caps and goals listed for each player do not include any matches played after the start of the tournament. The nationality for each club reflects the national association (not the league) to which the club is affiliated. A flag is included for coaches that are of a different nationality than their own national team.

== Group A ==
=== Cook Islands ===
Head coach: Angela Wallbank

The following 19 players were named in the final squad for the tournament:

No.	Pos.	Player	Date of birth (age)	Club
1	GK	Courtney Napa	28 December 1992 (aged 32)	(Cook Islands) Nikao Sokattak
2	FW	Te Upoko Tuariki	24 February 2006 (aged 19)	(Cook Islands) Puaikura
3	DF	Penina Katuke	19 November 2005 (aged 19)	(Cook Islands) Titikaveka
4	MF	Teretia Teinaki	23 January 2002 (aged 23)	(Cook Islands) Avatiu
5	MF	Kayleena Kermode	8 February 1999 (aged 26)	(Cook Islands) Tupapa Maraerenga
6	DF	Tanga Morris	28 November 1996 (aged 28)	(Cook Islands) Matavera-Ngatangiia
7	MF	Paulina Ngaroi	9 August 2003 (aged 21)	(Cook Islands) Avatiu
8	FW	Ngamata Moekaa	24 May 2002 (aged 23)	(Australia) Joondalup United
9	DF	Tineke de Jong	26 May 2002 (aged 23)	(New Zealand) Manukau United
10	DF	Tearoa Rouru	6 February 2005 (aged 20)	(Cook Islands) Matavera-Ngatangiia
11	DF	Claudean Robati	6 December 1988 (aged 36)	(Cook Islands) Tupapa Maraerenga
12	DF	Deja Pareta	19 June 2004 (aged 21)	(New Zealand) Hibiscus Coast
13	MF	Ally Toailoa	19 April 1999 (aged 26)	(New Zealand) Papakura City
14	MF	Mareta Brothers	9 April 2003 (aged 22)	(New Zealand) Manukau United
15	FW	Tayla Hetherington (Captain)	27 January 1994 (aged 31)	(New Zealand) Manukau United
16	MF	Maureen Fitzpatrick	8 December 2001 (aged 23)	(New Zealand) Franklin United
17	MF	Lee Maoate-Cox	21 March 1995 (aged 30)	(New Zealand) Coastal Spirit
20	GK	Kimberly Uini	23 August 2006 (aged 18)	(Cook Islands) Matavera-Ngatangiia
22	GK	Rianna Pepe	10 October 1998 (aged 26)	(Cook Islands) Tupapa Maraerenga

=== Papua New Guinea ===
Head coach: Eric Komeng

No.	Pos.	Player	Date of birth (age)	Club
1	GK	Leah Lou	26 April 2000 (aged 25)	
2	DF	Raynata Samuel	10 August 2004 (aged 20)	(Papua New Guinea) Hekari United
3	DF	Pauline David	24 February 1999 (aged 26)	
4	DF	Shalom Waida	15 February 2001 (aged 24)	(Papua New Guinea) Hekari United
5	DF	Olivia Upaupa	12 March 1997 (aged 28)	(Solomon Islands) Frigates United
6	DF	Serah Waida	24 July 1998 (aged 26)	(Papua New Guinea) Hekari United
7	MF	Ramona Padio (Captain)	13 March 1998 (aged 27)	(Papua New Guinea) Hekari United
8	MF	Mavis Singara	25 July 2003 (aged 21)	(Papua New Guinea) Hekari United
9	FW	Marie Kaipu	16 August 1997 (aged 27)	(Papua New Guinea) Hekari United
10	FW	Calista Maneo	29 September 2002 (aged 22)	(Papua New Guinea) Allies
11	FW	Nenny Elipas	25 May 2005 (aged 20)	(Papua New Guinea) Hekari United
12	GK	Emeliah Toks	28 July 2008 (aged 16)	(Papua New Guinea) Lae City
13	DF	Michaelyn Butubu	23 January 2003 (aged 22)	(Papua New Guinea) Hekari United
14	MF	Christie Maneu	17 August 2004 (aged 20)	
15	FW	Charlie Yandin	1 February 1997 (aged 28)	(Papua New Guinea) Lae City
16	DF	Merolyne Sali	30 October 1998 (aged 26)	(Papua New Guinea) Allies
17	MF	Phillis Pala	21 July 2003 (aged 21)	(Papua New Guinea) Hekari United
18	FW	Arnolda Dou	20 December 2001 (aged 23)	
19	FW	Keren Kalapai	22 August 2004 (aged 20)	(Papua New Guinea) Lae City
20	MF	Hortance Kimit	12 June 1995 (aged 30)	(Papua New Guinea) Hekari United
21	DF	Grace Batiy	14 October 1999 (aged 25)	(Papua New Guinea) Hekari United
22	GK	Lavina Hola	27 May 1996 (aged 29)	(Papua New Guinea) Mungkas
23	DF	Yvonne Gabong	29 August 1996 (aged 28)	

=== Samoa ===
Head coach: (Germany) (Guatemala) Juan José Chang

No.	Pos.	Player	Date of birth (age)	Club
1	GK	Xeyana Salanoa	20 June 2007 (aged 18)	
2	FW	Xevani Salanoa	17 October 2004 (aged 20)	
3	DF	Alisa Tuatagaloa (Captain)	5 August 2001 (aged 23)	
4	MF	Lianna Soifua	6 September 2000 (aged 24)	
5	FW	Oteta Kitiona	30 May 2005 (aged 20)	
6	MF	Jaedeci Uluvili	6 February 2001 (aged 24)	
7	FW	Lilly Dowsing	28 November 2006 (aged 18)	
8	MF	Malia Jessop	6 April 2007 (aged 18)	
9	FW	Sariah Taeoalii	7 May 2006 (aged 19)	
10	MF	Monique Fischer	19 December 1991 (aged 33)	
11	DF	Gracie Va'afusuaga	23 January 2002 (aged 23)	
12	GK	Kamy Anaya	26 April 2004 (aged 21)	
14	DF	Mia Afoa	11 February 2009 (aged 16)	
17	DF	Alexandrea Ape-Paia	7 August 2005 (aged 19)	
18	DF	Breanna Kitiona	9 January 2009 (aged 16)	
19	FW	Arianna Skeers	20 July 2006 (aged 18)	
21	DF	Tielua Baptista	12 April 2007 (aged 18)	
22	GK	Meripa Seumanutafa	11 December 2001 (aged 23)	

=== Tahiti ===
Head coach: Xavier Heifara

No.	Pos.	Player	Date of birth (age)	Club
1	GK	Gelimma El Hadj Kaddour	6 June 2005 (aged 20)	
3	DF	Tihiura Tahutini	9 January 2007 (aged 18)	
4	DF	Francesca Pagoubealo	19 September 1995 (aged 29)	
5	DF	Julienne Naomi	28 June 2003 (aged 22)	
6	MF	Vateanui Deane	3 November 1995 (aged 29)	(French Polynesia) A.S. Pirae
7	MF	Kohai Mai	14 February 2004 (aged 21)	(French Polynesia) A.S. Pirae
8	MF	Tevava Mai	4 May 1991 (aged 34)	
9	FW	Haranui Le Gayic	22 February 2007 (aged 18)	(French Polynesia) A.S. Tefana
11	FW	Heitiare Bonnet	4 July 1997 (aged 28)	
13	DF	Vahinetua Tuiho	28 December 2001 (aged 23)	
14	FW	Hereana Brothers	20 February 2007 (aged 18)	
15	FW	Tauhere Teore	15 November 2004 (aged 20)	(French Polynesia) A.S. Tefana
16	GK	Camille André	9 February 2003 (aged 22)	
17	FW	Kiani Wong	21 November 2000 (aged 24)	(France) F.C.G. Bordeaux
18	DF	Rere-Ura Peu	5 June 1996 (aged 29)	
19	FW	Anavai Taaviri	30 September 2005 (aged 19)	
21	DF	Gwendoline Fournier (Captain)	16 April 1991 (aged 34)	(French Polynesia) A.S. Pirae
22	MF	Tiare-Hei Ahupu	10 July 2005 (aged 19)	
23	GK	Ameria Bea	31 August 2004 (aged 20)	

== Group B ==
=== Fiji ===
Head coach: (Singapore) Angeline Chua

The following 23 players were named in the final squad for the tournament:

No.	Pos.	Player	Date of birth (age)	Club
1	GK	Mereoni Tinaimakubuna	10 July 1992 (aged 32)	(Fiji) Rewa
20	GK	Emily Esposito	20 January 2007 (aged 18)	(Fiji) Rewa
22	GK	Ka'iulani Scott	29 October 2007 (aged 17)	(New Zealand) Eastern Suburbs
2	DF	Filomena Racea	4 September 2001 (aged 23)	(Fiji) Rewa
4	DF	Naomi Waqanidrola	9 July 1993 (aged 31)	(Fiji) Rewa
5	DF	Maria Veronika	14 April 1999 (aged 26)	(Papua New Guinea) Hekari United
10	DF	Pijila Kilaiwaca	27 December 2005 (aged 19)	(Fiji) Rewa
14	DF	Mereoni Tora	26 October 1998 (aged 26)	(Fiji) Ba
16	DF	Caroline Qalivere	8 March 2007 (aged 18)	(Fiji) Lautoka
18	DF	Ema Mereia	29 October 2006 (aged 18)	(Fiji) Labasa
19	DF	Sereana Naweni	3 October 2006 (aged 18)	(Fiji) Ba
21	DF	Akanisi Sorovakarua	23 June 2005 (aged 20)	(United States) West LA College
3	MF	Adi Litia Bakaniceva	9 March 2004 (aged 21)	(Papua New Guinea) Hekari United
6	MF	Cema Nasau	15 November 1999 (aged 25)	(New Zealand) Eastern Suburbs
11	MF	Jotivini Tabua	25 January 1996 (aged 29)	(Fiji) Rewa
12	MF	Preeya Singh	19 August 2004 (aged 20)	(United States) UC Merced
13	MF	Elesi Tabunase	12 August 2008 (aged 16)	(Fiji) Ba
18	MF	Rahul Krishna	16 October 1994 (aged 30)	(Fiji) Navua
23	MF	Anisha Dwarka	4 November 2006 (aged 18)	(United States) Jessup University
7	FW	Koleta Likuculacula	17 August 2000 (aged 24)	(Fiji) Ba
8	FW	Narieta Leba	18 August 2004 (aged 20)	(Fiji) Suva
9	FW	Trina Davis	6 September 2001 (aged 23)	(United States) FC Olympia
15	FW	Kasanita Taufa Tabua	28 May 2007 (aged 18)	(Fiji) Rewa
17	FW	Adi Reva	23 November 2010 (aged 14)	(Fiji) Ba

=== Solomon Islands ===
Head coach: Moses Toata

No.	Pos.	Player	Date of birth (age)	Club
1	GK	Zainab Donga	11 August 2000 (aged 24)	
2	DF	Edith Nari	28 August 2003 (aged 21)	
3	FW	Sharoly Saeni	25 January 2003 (aged 22)	
4	FW	Jacklyn Ikama	25 May 1998 (aged 27)	
5	DF	Bridget Alele	18 January 2004 (aged 21)	
6	MF	Mesalyn Saepio	25 November 1991 (aged 33)	
7	FW	Almah Gogoni	28 December 2000 (aged 24)	
8	FW	Madeline Arukau	1 April 2003 (aged 22)	
9	FW	Lorina Solosaia	6 July 2002 (aged 22)	
10	FW	Ileen Pegi	18 July 1992 (aged 32)	
11	FW	Gertrude Oritaimae	28 July 2007 (aged 17)	
12	GK	Rose Oge	21 September 2000 (aged 24)	
13	DF	Cathy Ramo	29 August 2009 (aged 15)	
14	DF	Claudia Votu	17 October 2000 (aged 24)	
15	MF	Alisha Donga	12 April 2002 (aged 23)	
16	MF	Betty Oriana	11 December 2008 (aged 16)	
17	FW	Jemina David	4 December 1994 (aged 30)	
18	FW	Agnes Gitoli	6 October 1998 (aged 26)	
19	MF	Sandy Aniholland	9 September 1991 (aged 33)	
20	GK	Joan Hanigaro	16 May 2001 (aged 24)	
21	FW	Naelyn Metake	7 March 2003 (aged 22)	
22	MF	Veronica Tolivaka	11 October 1993 (aged 31)	
23	FW	Joy Toby	2 July 2008 (aged 17)	

=== Tonga ===
Head coach: Kilifi Uele

Tonga announced their 23-player squad on 7 June 2025. together with Sophiana Moala, Ann Loti, and Helena Otukolo named as reserve players.

No.	Pos.	Player	Date of birth (age)	Club
1	GK	Keira Wolfgramm	9 June 2008 (aged 17)	(United States) Orlando Pride
2	DF	Kanani Haunga	21 May 2007 (aged 18)	(United States) La Roca
3	DF	Gabriella Filimoeatu	13 February 2007 (aged 18)	(United States) Utah Surf
4	MF	'Ana Lauteau	6 August 2002 (aged 22)	(Tonga) Veitongo
5	DF	Lavinia Afu	28 May 2001 (aged 24)	(Tonga) Longolongo
6	FW	Vea Funaki	26 May 1996 (aged 29)	(New Zealand) Palmerston North United
7	MF	Anela Makaafi	3 February 2006 (aged 19)	(United States) Boise Thorns
8	MF	Leila Hausia-Haugen	16 April 2004 (aged 21)	(New Zealand) Otago University
9	MF	'Ana Polovili	4 March 2002 (aged 23)	(Tonga) Veitongo
10	FW	Tama'a Faletau	12 May 2007 (aged 18)	(Tonga) Veitongo
11	FW	Lositika Feke (Captain)	10 April 2003 (aged 22)	(Tonga) Longolongo
12	MF	Cienna Filimoeatu	10 July 2008 (aged 16)	(United States) Utah Surf
13	DF	Vika Mafi	13 January 2007 (aged 18)	(Tonga) Veitongo
14	DF	'Anau Lopeti	30 April 2008 (aged 17)	(Tonga) Longolongo
15	FW	'Ana Pongi	21 February 2007 (aged 18)	(Tonga) Veitongo
16	GK	Madison Tenifa	17 April 2004 (aged 21)	(Tonga) Veitongo
17	MF	Tema Tonga	5 March 2008 (aged 17)	(Tonga) Nukuhhetulu
18	FW	Eden Makaafi	16 January 2002 (aged 23)	(United States) College of Idaho
19	MF	Sophie Hale	16 May 2009 (aged 16)	(Tonga) Lapaha
20	GK	Temaleti Taufa'a'o	9 March 2009 (aged 16)	(Tonga) Veitongo
21	DF	'Ana Talasinga	1 May 2006 (aged 19)	(Tonga) Veitongo
22	FW	Lupe Vaea	12 February 2004 (aged 21)	(Tonga) Lapaha
23	DF	Losaline Tu'utafaiva	14 July 2009 (aged 15)	(Tonga) Nukuhhetulu

=== Vanuatu ===
Head coach: Jean Yelou

Vanuatu announced their 19-player squad on 24 June 2025.

No.	Pos.	Player	Date of birth (age)	Club
1	GK	Vanissa Wilson	3 May 1993 (aged 32)	
3	MF	Jesta Toka	12 September 1997 (aged 27)	
4	DF	Nelly Kaltak	22 October 2003 (aged 21)	
5	DF	Limas Erikan	29 January 2000 (aged 25)	
6	FW	Jane Alatoa	14 April 1999 (aged 26)	
7	FW	Rita Solomon	29 March 2001 (aged 24)	
8	FW	Augustine Mansale	1 August 2005 (aged 19)	
9	FW	Leimata Simon	19 December 2000 (aged 24)	
11	MF	Angelina Poida	26 November 2006 (aged 18)	
12	GK	Flavia Peter	9 April 2005 (aged 20)	
14	DF	Nellie Vuti	4 May 2005 (aged 20)	
15	DF	Noeline Erikan	24 December 2001 (aged 23)	
16	FW	Brenda Anis	18 March 1996 (aged 29)	
17	DF	Noella Metoriki	28 January 2002 (aged 23)	
18	MF	Fevie Siehi	8 April 1994 (aged 31)	
19	FW	Henriette Sangul	3 October 2003 (aged 21)	
20	DF	Gaylindrah Tari	9 June 1995 (aged 30)	
21	GK	Amelia Reddy	8 March 2002 (aged 23)	
22	DF	Willine Viti	30 July 2004 (aged 20)	
