= 2022 OFC Women's Nations Cup Group C =

The 2022 OFC Women's Nations Cup Group C is the third of three sets in the group stage of the 2022 OFC Women's Nations Cup that will take place from 14 July 2022 to 20 July 2022. The group competition will consist of hosts Fiji, New Caledonia, and Solomon Islands. The top two teams automatically qualify for the top eight knockout stage, while third place is comparatively evaluated to other third-placed teams based on the football ranking system for the last two berths.

== Teams ==
Draw position	Team	Pot	Finals appearance	Previous best performance	FIFA Rankings
C1	Fiji	1	5th	Runners-up (2018)	69
C2	New Caledonia	2	3rd	Third place (1983)	100
C3	Solomon Islands	3	3rd	Fourth place (2007, 2010)	120

== Standings ==
Pos	Team	Pld	W	D	L	GF	GA	GD	Pts	Qualification
1	Fiji (H)	2	1	1	0	4	2	+2	4	Knockout stage
2	Solomon Islands	2	0	2	0	3	3	0	2	Knockout stage
3	New Caledonia	2	0	1	1	3	5	−2	1	Knockout stage

Source: OFC
Rules for classification: Group stage tiebreakers
(H) Hosts

== Matches ==
=== Solomon Islands vs Fiji ===
14 July 2022
19:00

Solomon Islands	1–1	Fiji
Pegi 37' (pen.)	Report (FIFA); Report (OFC)	Kumar 22'

ANZ Stadium, Suva
Attendance: 865
Referee: Anna-Marie Keighley (New Zealand)

=== Fiji vs New Caledonia ===
17 July 2022
19:00

Fiji	3–1	New Caledonia
Hussein 4'; Diyalowai 45', 56'	Report (FIFA); Report (OFC)	Pahoa 90+1' (pen.)

ANZ Stadium, Suva
Attendance: 500
Referee: Anna-Marie Keighley (New Zealand)

=== New Caledonia vs Solomon Islands ===
20 July 2022
19:00

New Caledonia	2–2	Solomon Islands
Neporo 73', 79'	Report (FIFA); Report (OFC)	Gogoni 16'; Maefiti 86'

ANZ Stadium, Suva
Attendance: 500
Referee: Anna-Marie Keighley (New Zealand)

== Discipline ==
Fair play points would have been used as tiebreakers in the group if the overall and head-to-head records of teams were tied, or if teams had the same record in the ranking of third-placed teams. These were calculated based on yellow and red cards received in all group matches as follows:

- yellow card = 1 point
- red card as a result of two yellow cards = 3 points
- direct red card = 3 points
- yellow card followed by direct red card = 4 points

Team	Match 1				Match 2				Points
Team	Booked	(yellow card) (yellow-red card)	Sent off (straight red)	(yellow card) (red card)	Booked	(yellow card) (yellow-red card)	Sent off (straight red)	(yellow card) (red card)	Points
Fiji					1				–1
New Caledonia	2				1				–3
Solomon Islands	1				1				–2
