= Football at the 2023 Pacific Games – Women's tournament =

2023 Pacific Games women's football tournament
Tournament details
- Host country: Solomon Islands
- City: Honiara
- Dates: 17 November–2 December
- Teams: 10 (from 1 confederation)
- Venues: 2 (in 1 host city)

Final positions
- Champions: Papua New Guinea (6th title)
- Runners-up: Fiji
- Third place: New Caledonia
- Fourth place: Samoa

Tournament statistics
- Matches played: 20
- Goals scored: 82 (4.1 per match)
- Top scorer(s): (Papua New Guinea) Ramona Padio (11 goals)

The women’s football tournament at the 2023 Pacific Games was the 6th edition of the women’s football tournament at the Pacific Games, and was held from the 17 November to 2 December.

Papua New Guinea were the defending champions and successfully defended their title.

== Teams ==
10 teams entered the tournament.

- American Samoa
- Cook Islands
- Fiji
- New Caledonia
- Papua New Guinea
- Samoa
- Solomon Islands (Host)
- Tahiti
- Tonga
- Vanuatu

== Venues ==
3 confirmed venues.

Honiara
National Stadium	Lawson Tama Stadium	SIFF Academy
Capacity: 10,000	Capacity: 20,000	Capacity: 500
Football at the 2023 Pacific Games – Women's tournament is located in Solomon Islands

== Group stage ==
The team list was confirmed on 21 October 2023.

=== Group A ===
Pos	Team	Pld	W	D	L	GF	GA	GD	Pts	Qualification
1	Papua New Guinea	3	2	1	0	14	2	+12	7	Knockout stage
2	New Caledonia	3	2	1	0	11	4	+7	7	Knockout stage
3	Cook Islands	3	1	0	2	5	8	−3	3	Advance to 9th place match
4	American Samoa	3	0	0	3	0	16	−16	0	Advance to 9th place match

Source: SOL23
17 November 2023
16:00

Cook Islands	2–5	New Caledonia
Teinaki 28'; Williams 75'	Report	Wenessia 44', 55'; Honakoko 65', 78', 83'

SIFF Academy Field 2, Honiara
Referee: David Yareboinen (Papua New Guinea)
17 November 2023
19:00

Papua New Guinea	9–0	American Samoa
Padio 7', 34', 49', 53' (pen.), 78', 84'; Elipas 50'; Kaipu 58', 76'	Report

SIFF Academy Field 1, Honiara
Referee: Ben Ariel Aukwai (Solomon Islands)

20 November 2023
16:00

Papua New Guinea	3–0	Cook Islands
Padio 16', 26'; Butubu 81'	Report

SIFF Academy Field 2, Honiara
Referee: Norbert Hauata (Tahiti)
20 November 2023
19:00

New Caledonia	4–0	American Samoa
Hnaune 45+8'; Wenessia 52'; Palene 57'; Ligneul 86'	Report

SIFF Academy Field 1, Honiara
Referee: Calvin Berg (New Zealand)

23 November 2023
16:00

Cook Islands	3–0	American Samoa
Fitzpatrick 24'; Fatiaki 38'; Teinaki 52'	Report

SIFF Academy Field 2, Honiara
Referee: Kavitesh Behari (Fiji)
23 November 2023
19:00

New Caledonia	2–2	Papua New Guinea
Wenessia 26'; Hnaune 88'	Report	Ligneul 24' (o.g.); Butubu 50'

SIFF Academy Field 1, Honiara
Referee: Ben Ariel Aukwai (Solomon Islands)

=== Group B ===
Pos	Team	Pld	W	D	L	GF	GA	GD	Pts	Qualification
1	Samoa	2	2	0	0	7	3	+4	6	Knockout stage
2	Tahiti	2	0	1	1	4	5	−1	1	Advance to 5th–8th placement matches
3	Tonga	2	0	1	1	3	6	−3	1	Advance to 5th–8th placement matches

Source: SOL23
18 November 2023
12:00

Tahiti	2–3	Samoa
Samin 33'; Teore 82'	Report	Dade 7'; Taeaoalii 10'; Stewart 87' (pen.)

Lawson Tama Stadium, Honiara
Referee: David Yareboinen (Papua New Guinea)

21 November 2023
12:00

Tonga	2–2	Tahiti
Polovili 90', 90+1'	Report	Wong 7'; Mai 59'

Lawson Tama Stadium, Honiara
Referee: Ben Ariel Aukwai (Solomon Islands)

24 November 2023
12:00

Samoa	4–1	Tonga
Dowsing 4'; Dade 18', 52'; Stewart 68'	Report	Polivili 35' (pen.)

Lawson Tama Stadium, Honiara
Referee: David Yareboinen (Papua New Guinea)

=== Group C ===
Pos	Team	Pld	W	D	L	GF	GA	GD	Pts	Qualification
1	Fiji	2	2	0	0	7	3	+4	6	Knockout stage
2	Solomon Islands (H)	2	1	0	1	2	4	−2	3	Advance to 5th–8th placement matches
3	Vanuatu	2	0	0	2	2	4	−2	0	Advance to 5th–8th placement matches

Source: SOL23
(H) Hosts
18 November 2023
15:00

Vanuatu	0–1	Solomon Islands
	Report	David 81'

Lawson Tama Stadium, Honiara
Referee: Calvin Berg (New Zealand)

21 November 2023
15:00

Fiji	3–2	Vanuatu
Nasau 25'; Bakaniceva 33'; Tamanitoakula 90+7' (pen.)	Report	Simon 68'; Taravaki 80'

Lawson Tama Stadium, Honiara
Referee: Norbert Hauata (Tahiti)

24 November 2023
15:00

Fiji	4–1	Solomon Islands
Diyalowai 4'; Davis 21', 72'; Tamanitoakula 89' (pen.)	Report	Gogoni 1'

Lawson Tama Stadium, Honiara
Referee: CK Kawana-Waugh (New Zealand)

=== Ranking of second-place teams ===
Due to groups having a different number of teams, the results against the fourth-placed teams in four-team groups were not be considered for this ranking.

Pos	Grp	Team	Pld	W	D	L	GF	GA	GD	Pts	Qualification
1	A	New Caledonia	2	1	1	0	7	4	+3	4	Knockout stage
2	C	Solomon Islands	2	1	0	1	2	4	−2	3	Advance to 5th–8th placement matches
3	B	Tahiti	2	0	1	1	4	5	−1	1	Advance to 5th–8th placement matches

Source: SOL23

== Placement matches ==
=== 5th–8th places ===
Semi-finals
28 November – Honiara
Tahiti	1
Vanuatu	2
28 November – Honiara
Solomon Islands	1
Tonga	0

5th place match
1 December – Honiara
Vanuatu	2
Solomon Islands	1
7th place match
1 December – Honiara
Tahiti	0
Tonga	2

9th place match
28 November – Honiara
Cook Islands	0
American Samoa	3

=== 9th place match ===
28 November 2023
13:00

Cook Islands	0–3 (w/o)	American Samoa
	Report

SIFF Academy Fields 1 & 2, Honiara

=== Semi-finals ===
28 November 2023
16:00

Tahiti	1–2	Vanuatu
Maraetefau 15'	Report	Alatoa 46'; Sine 75'

SIFF Academy Fields 1 & 2, Honiara
Referee: Kavitesh Behari (Fiji)
28 November 2023
19:00

Solomon Islands	1–0	Tonga
Solosaia 4'	Report

SIFF Academy Fields 1 & 2, Honiara
Referee: Calvin Berg (New Zealand)

=== 7th place match ===
1 December 2023
10:00

Tahiti	0–2	Tonga
	Report	Feke 10'; Swift 26'

SIFF Academy Fields 1 & 2, Honiara
Referee: Torika Delai (Fiji)

=== 5th place match ===
1 December 2023
13:00

Vanuatu	2–1	Solomon Islands
Solomon 16'; Sine 72'	Report	Pegi 35'

SIFF Academy Fields 1 & 2, Honiara
Referee: Kavitesh Behari (Fiji)

== Knockout stage ==
Semi-finals
27 November – Honiara
Papua New Guinea	5
Samoa	1
27 November – Honiara
Fiji	3
New Caledonia	0

Gold Playoff
1 December – Honiara
Papua New Guinea	4
Fiji	1
Bronze Playoff
1 December – Honiara
Samoa	1
New Caledonia	3

=== Semi-finals ===
27 November 2023
12:00

Papua New Guinea	5–1	Samoa
Padio 7', 26', 78'; Kaipu 40', 64'	Report	Lyne-Lewis 56'

Lawson Tama Stadium, Honiara
Referee: Bernard Mutukera (Solomon Islands)
27 November 2023
15:00

Fiji	3–0	New Caledonia
Mereia 25'; Nasau 50'; Kumar 67'	Report

Lawson Tama Stadium, Honiara
Referee: Calvin Berg (New Zealand)

=== Third place match ===
1 December 2023
12:00

Samoa	1–3	New Caledonia
Taeoalii 79'	Report	Palene 83', 88'; Wenessia 90'

Lawson Tama Stadium, Honiara
Referee: Timothy Niu (Solomon Islands)

=== Final ===
1 December 2023
19:00

Papua New Guinea	4–1	Fiji
Pala 20'; Kaipu 72'; Maneo 80', 90+8'	Report	Davis 90+2'

National Stadium, Honiara
Referee: Calvin Berg (New Zealand)

== Goalscorers ==
There were 82 goals scored in 20 matches, for an average of 4.1 goals per match.

11 goals

- (Papua New Guinea) Ramona Padio

5 goals

- (New Caledonia) Alice Wenessia
- (Papua New Guinea) Marie Kaipu

3 goals

- (Fiji) Trina Davis
- (New Caledonia) Julia Honakoko
- (New Caledonia) Marie-Laure Palene
- (Samoa) Sasjah Vikolia Dade
- (Tonga) Ana Polovili

2 goals

- (Cook Islands) Teretia Teinaki
- (Fiji) Cema Nasau
- (Fiji) Luisa Tamanitoakula
- (New Caledonia) Ronaldine Hnaune
- (Papua New Guinea) Michaelyne Butubu
- (Papua New Guinea) Calista Maneo
- (Samoa) Jayda Stewart
- (Vanuatu) Diana Sine

1 goal

- (Cook Islands) Susan Williams
- (Cook Islands) Maureen Fitzpatrick
- (Cook Islands) Victoria Fatiaki
- (Fiji) Adi Litia Bakaniceva
- (Fiji) Sofi Diyalowai
- (Fiji) Vanisha Kumar
- (Fiji) Ema Mereia
- (New Caledonia) Jennel Ligneul
- (Papua New Guinea) Nenny Elipas
- (Papua New Guinea) Phylis Pala
- (Samoa) Lilly Dowsing
- (Samoa) Torijan Lyne-Lewis
- (Samoa) Sariah Taeaoalii
- (Samoa) Grace Taeoalii
- (Solomon Islands) Jemina David
- (Solomon Islands) Almah Gogoni
- (Solomon Islands) Lorina Solosaia
- (Solomon Islands) Ileen Pegi
- (French Polynesia) Vaihei Samin
- (French Polynesia) Cheyenne Tauhere Teore
- (French Polynesia) Kiani Wong
- (French Polynesia) Kohai Mai
- (French Polynesia) Teatarii Maraetefau
- (Tonga) Lositika Feke
- (Tonga) Kiana Swift
- (Vanuatu) Leimata Simon
- (Vanuatu) Emilia Taravaki
- (Vanuatu) Jane Alatoa
- (Vanuatu) Rita Solomon

1 own goal

- (New Caledonia) Jennel Ligneul (against Papua New Guinea)

== Final rankings ==
Rank	Team
Gold medal	Papua New Guinea
Silver medal	Fiji
Bronze medal	New Caledonia
4	Samoa
5	Vanuatu
6	Solomon Islands
7	Tonga
8	Tahiti
9	American Samoa
10	Cook Islands

== Broadcasting ==
All matches will be broadcast live on SBS.

== See also ==
- Football at the 2023 Pacific Games – Men's tournament
- Football at the 2023 Pacific Games
- Football at the Pacific Games
