= 2022 OFC Women's Nations Cup Group A =

The 2022 OFC Women's Nations Cup Group A is the first of three sets in the group stage of the 2022 OFC Women's Nations Cup that will take place from 13 July 2022 to 19 July 2022. The group competition will consist of Tonga, Cook Islands, and Samoa. The top two teams automatically qualify for the top eight knockout stage, while third place is comparatively evaluated to other third-placed teams based on the football ranking system for the last two berths.

== Teams ==
Draw position	Team	Pot	Finals appearance	Previous best performance	FIFA Rankings
A1	Tonga	1	5th	Third place (2007)	92
A2	Cook Islands	2	5th	Third place (2010, 2014)	102
A3	Samoa	3	4th	Fourth place (2003)	109

== Standings ==
Pos	Team	Pld	W	D	L	GF	GA	GD	Pts	Qualification
1	Samoa	2	2	0	0	3	0	+3	6	Knockout stage
2	Cook Islands	2	0	1	1	1	2	−1	1	Knockout stage
3	Tonga	2	0	1	1	1	3	−2	1	Knockout stage

Source: OFC
Rules for classification: Group stage tiebreakers

== Matches ==
=== Samoa vs Tonga ===
13 July 2022
19:00

Samoa	2–0	Tonga
Fischer 28'; Stewart 70'	Report (FIFA); Report (OFC)

ANZ Stadium, Suva
Attendance: 100
Referee: Shama Maemae (Solomon Islands)

=== Tonga vs Cook Islands ===
16 July 2022
19:00

Tonga	1–1	Cook Islands
Swift 73'	Report (FIFA); Report (OFC)	Davison 49'

ANZ Stadium, Suva
Attendance: 100
Referee: Delvin Joel (Vanuatu)

=== Cook Islands vs Samoa ===
19 July 2022
19:00

Cook Islands	0–1	Samoa
	Report (FIFA); Report (OFC)	Stewart 14'

ANZ Stadium, Suva
Attendance: 100
Referee: Shama Maemae (Solomon Islands)

== Discipline ==
Fair play points would have been used as tiebreakers in the group if the overall and head-to-head records of teams were tied, or if teams had the same record in the ranking of third-placed teams. These were calculated based on yellow and red cards received in all group matches as follows:

- yellow card = 1 point
- red card as a result of two yellow cards = 3 points
- direct red card = 3 points
- yellow card followed by direct red card = 4 points

Team	Match 1				Match 2				Points
Team	Booked	(yellow card) (yellow-red card)	Sent off (straight red)	(yellow card) (red card)	Booked	(yellow card) (yellow-red card)	Sent off (straight red)	(yellow card) (red card)	Points
Tonga									0
Cook Islands					2				–2
Samoa									0
