= 2024 Women's Olympic Football Tournament – Oceania Qualifier =

2024 OFC Women's Olympic Qualifying Tournament
Tournament details
- Host country: Samoa
- City: Apia
- Dates: 7–19 February 2024
- Teams: 8 (from 1 confederation)
- Venue: 2 (in 1 host city)

Final positions
- Champions: New Zealand (4th title)
- Runners-up: Solomon Islands

Tournament statistics
- Matches played: 15
- Goals scored: 82 (5.47 per match)
- Attendance: 1,050 (70 per match)
- Top scorer(s): (Papua New Guinea) Marie Kaipu (New Zealand) Grace Jale (7 goals each)

The 2024 OFC Women's Olympic Qualifying Tournament was the 5th edition of the OFC Women's Olympic Qualifying Tournament, the quadrennial international football competition organized by the Oceania Football Confederation (OFC).

In the slot allocation for the 2024 Summer Olympics by the FIFA Council, the OFC had been given one slot for the 2024 Summer Olympics. The qualifying tournament was to determine which women's national team from Oceania would qualify for the Olympic football tournament.

The tournament consisted of eight teams and was played between 7 and 19 February.

The winners of the tournament, New Zealand, qualified for the 2024 Summer Olympics women's football tournament in France as the OFC representative.

== Teams ==
The draw for the tournament was held on 23 November 2023. The eight teams who entered qualification were ranked according to the August 2023 FIFA Women's World Ranking, with the top two nations allocated to Pot A, the next four teams to Pot B, and the final two teams to Pot C. Teams were drawn from Pot C to the fourth position in groups A and B, respectively. Then teams were drawn from Pot B into the third position in each group, then the second position in each group. Finally, the teams in Pot A were drawn into the first position in each group.

From the August 2023 FIFA Women's World Ranking
Pot A	Pot B	Pot C
1. New Zealand (26); 2. Papua New Guinea (54)	3. Fiji (71); 4. Tonga (92); 5. Samoa (97); 6. Solomon Islands (104)	7. Vanuatu (122); 8. American Samoa (NR)

Did not enter

- New Caledonia (107) (Note: New Caledonia and Tahiti are not members of the IOC, thus would be ineligible to compete in the Olympics regardless of results)
- Tahiti (108)
- Cook Islands (109)

== Venue ==
All matches were played at the FFS Football Stadium across two fields.

2024 OFC Women's Olympic Qualifying Tournament venue
Apia
FFS Football Stadium
Capacity: 3,500

== Group stage ==
All match times are UTC+13.

=== Group A ===
Pos	Team	Pld	W	D	L	GF	GA	GD	Pts	Qualification
1	Solomon Islands	3	2	1	0	11	3	+8	7	Knockout stage
2	Fiji	3	2	0	1	15	6	+9	6	Knockout stage
3	Papua New Guinea	3	1	1	1	13	5	+8	4	
4	American Samoa	3	0	0	3	1	26	−25	0	

Source: OFC
7 February 2024
12:00

Fiji	10–0	American Samoa
Diyalowai 2', 13', 14'; Likuculacula 34'; Nasau 45', 56', 76'; Tabua 60', 90+5'; Singh 69'	Report

FFS Football Stadium (Field 2), Apia
Attendance: 250
Referee: Teremoana Roihau (Tahiti)
7 February 2024
15:00

Papua New Guinea	1–1	Solomon Islands
Kalapai 69'	Report	Solosaia 30'

FFS Football Stadium (Field 2), Apia
Attendance: 100
Referee: Norbert Hauata (Tahiti)

10 February 2024
12:00

American Samoa	1–7	Solomon Islands
Waetin 88'	Report	Solosaia 14', 29', 35', 73', 75'; Gogoni 58'; David 82'

FFS Football Stadium (Field 2), Apia
Attendance: 100
Referee: Mederic Lacour (New Caledonia)
10 February 2024
15:00

Papua New Guinea	3–4	Fiji
Kalapai 39', 65'; Maneo 67'	Report	Diyalowai 11'; Leba 26', 43', 61' (pen.)

FFS Football Stadium (Field 2), Apia
Attendance: 100
Referee: Campbell-Kirk Kawana-Waugh (New Zealand)

13 February 2024
11:00

American Samoa	0–9	Papua New Guinea
	Report	Kaipu 8', 13', 20', 46', 57', 64', 67'; Pala 82' (pen.); Bangita 88'

FFS Football Stadium (Field 1), Apia
Referee: Mederic Lacour (New Caledonia)
13 February 2024
11:00

Solomon Islands	3–1	Fiji
Pegi 17', 45+1', 90+4' (pen.)	Report	Leba 80' (pen.)

FFS Football Stadium (Field 2), Apia
Attendance: 100
Referee: Campbell-Kirk Kawana-Waugh (New Zealand)

=== Group B ===
Pos	Team	Pld	W	D	L	GF	GA	GD	Pts	Qualification
1	New Zealand	3	3	0	0	14	0	+14	9	Knockout stage
2	Samoa (H)	3	2	0	1	3	6	−3	6	Knockout stage
3	Tonga	3	1	0	2	2	6	−4	3	
4	Vanuatu	3	0	0	3	1	8	−7	0	

Source: OFC
(H) Hosts
7 February 2024
13:00

New Zealand	3–0	Tonga
Jale 2', 16'; Green 13' (pen.)	Report

FFS Football Stadium (Field 1), Apia
Referee: Ben Aukwai (Solomon Islands)
7 February 2024
17:00

Samoa	1–0	Vanuatu
Manuleleua 90+6' (pen.)	Report

FFS Football Stadium (Field 1), Apia
Referee: Torika Delai (Fiji)

10 February 2024
13:00

Vanuatu	1–2	Tonga
Aruvuha 6'	Report	Swift 10'; Vunipola 15'

FFS Football Stadium (Field 1), Apia
Referee: Shama Maemae (Solomon Islands)
10 February 2024
17:00

New Zealand	6–0	Samoa
Hand 8'; Taylor 16'; Dade 23' (o.g.); Fraser 34'; Green 60'; Foster 75'	Report

FFS Football Stadium (Field 1), Apia
Referee: David Yareboinen (Papua New Guinea)

13 February 2024
16:00

Tonga	0–2	Samoa
	Report	Fischer 37'; Stewart 80'

FFS Football Stadium (Field 1), Apia
Attendance: 500
Referee: David Yareboinen (Papua New Guinea)
13 February 2024
16:00

Vanuatu	0–5	New Zealand
	Report	Hand 12'; Hassett 21'; Riley 30', 43'; Fraser 50'

FFS Football Stadium (Field 2), Apia
Referee: Kavitesh Behari (Fiji)

== Final round ==
=== Bracket ===
Semi-finals
16 February 2024 – Apia
Solomon Islands	2
Samoa	0
16 February 2024 – Apia
New Zealand	7
Fiji	1

Final
19 February 2024 – Apia
Solomon Islands	1
New Zealand	11

=== Semi-finals ===
16 February 2024
13:00

Solomon Islands	2–0	Samoa
Aniholland 65'; Pegi 78' (pen.)	Report

FFS Football Stadium (Field 1), Apia
Referee: Mederic Lacour (New Caledonia)

16 February 2024
17:00

New Zealand	7–1	Fiji
Riley 6', 45+6'; Hand 24', 45+4'; Jale 45+2', 67', 83'	Report	Nasau 90+3'

FFS Football Stadium (Field 1), Apia
Referee: David Yareboinen (Papua New Guinea)

=== Final ===
19 February 2024
17:00

Solomon Islands	1–11	New Zealand
David 55'	Report	Hand 12'; Wilkinson 20', 56'; Bowen 25'; Jale 37', 63'; Riley 45+1', 52'; Kitching 70', 76'; Nathan 88'

FFS Football Stadium (Field 1), Apia
Referee: Norbert Hauata (Tahiti)

Player of the Match:
Indiah-Paige Riley (New Zealand)

Assistant referees:
Lata Kaumatule (Tonga)
Vaihina Teura (Tahiti)
Fourth official:
Mederic Lacour (New Caledonia)
Fifth official:
Jeremy Garae (Vanuatu)

== Qualified teams for the 2024 Summer Olympics ==
The following team from OFC qualified for the 2024 Summer Olympic women's football tournament in France.

Team	Qualified on	Previous appearances in Summer Olympics
New Zealand	February 19, 2024	4 (2008, 2012, 2016, 2020)

== Goalscorers ==
There were 82 goals scored in 15 matches, for an average of 5.47 goals per match.

7 goals

- (New Zealand) Grace Jale
- (Papua New Guinea) Marie Kaipu

6 goals

- (New Zealand) Indiah-Paige Riley
- (Solomon Islands) Lorina Solosaia

5 goals

- (New Zealand) Jacqui Hand

4 goals

- (Fiji) Sofi Diyalowai
- (Fiji) Narieta Leba
- (Fiji) Cema Nasau
- (Solomon Islands) Ileen Pegi

3 goals

- (Papua New Guinea) Keren Kalapai

2 goals

- (Fiji) Kasanita Tabua
- (New Zealand) Macey Fraser
- (New Zealand) Ally Green
- (New Zealand) Katie Kitching
- (New Zealand) Hannah Wilkinson
- (Solomon Islands) Jemina David

1 goal

- (American Samoa) Lela Waetin
- (Fiji) Koleta Likuculacula
- (Fiji) Preeya Singh
- (New Zealand) Katie Bowen
- (New Zealand) Michaela Foster
- (New Zealand) Betsy Hassett
- (New Zealand) Ruby Nathan
- (New Zealand) Kate Taylor
- (Papua New Guinea) Cynthia Bangita
- (Papua New Guinea) Calista Maneo
- (Papua New Guinea) Phylis Pala
- (Samoa) Monique Fischer
- (Samoa) Leah Manuleleua
- (Samoa) Jayda Stewart
- (Solomon Islands) Sandy Aniholland
- (Solomon Islands) Almah Gogoni
- (Tonga) Sachi Swift
- (Tonga) Telusila Vunipola
- (Vanuatu) Elina Aruvuha

1 own goal

- (Samoa) Sasjah Vikolia Dade (against New Zealand)

== Awards ==
Team of the tournament
Goalkeeper	(Samoa) Xeyana Salaona			
Defenders	(New Zealand) Rebekah Stott		(Samoa) Sasjah Dade	(Solomon Islands) Lisa Solo
Midfielders	(New Zealand) Indiah-Paige Riley	(New Zealand) Kate Taylor	(Fiji) Cema Nasau	(Fiji) Adi Litia Bakaniceva
Forwards	(New Zealand) Grace Jale		(Solomon Islands) Lorina Solosaia	(Solomon Islands) Ileen Pegi

== Broadcasting ==
On 7 February 2024, the opening day of the tournament, Oceania Football Confederation announced that all the matches will be streamed live on FIFA+.
