= 2027 FIFA Women's World Cup qualification (OFC) =

Association football competition

Tournament details
- Dates: 28 November 2025 – 15 April 2026
- Teams: 11 (from 1 confederation)

Tournament statistics
- Matches played: 18
- Goals scored: 58 (3.22 per match)
- Attendance: 10,532 (585 per match)
- Top scorer(s): (New Zealand) Kelli Brown (5 goals)

The Oceanian section of the 2027 FIFA Women's World Cup qualification process began on 28 November 2025 and completed on 15 April 2026, with the winner qualifying for the 2027 FIFA Women's World Cup and the runner-up advancing to the inter-confederation play-offs.

== Format ==
OFC announced the tournament format on 8 August 2025:

- First round: The four lowest-ranked teams participated in a single-leg knockout round with match day 1 on 28 November 2025, and the winners of those matches facing each other on 1 December 2025. The first round winner advanced to the second round.
- Second round: The first round winner joined the seven-highest ranked teams to be split into two groups of four teams each to play single round-robin matches during the international window of 27 February – 5 March 2026. The group winners and runners-up advanced to the third round.
- Third round: The second round group winners and runners-up participated in a single-leg knockout round 11–15 April 2026. The winners qualified for the 2027 FIFA Women's World Cup, and the runners-up advanced to the inter-confederation play-offs.

== Teams ==
Teams were ranked according to the FIFA Women's World Ranking released on 7 August 2025:

Bye to second round (Note: FIFA Rank at the time of the draw in parentheses)	Entering first round
1. New Zealand (33); 2. Papua New Guinea (61); 3. Solomon Islands (73); 4. Fiji (78); 5. Samoa (86); 6. Vanuatu (100); 7. New Caledonia (101)	8. Tonga (107); 9. Tahiti (119); 10. Cook Islands (122); 11. American Samoa (153)

=== Second round draw ===
The draw for the second round took place on 15 August 2025 at 15:00 NZST. Teams were first drawn from Pot 3 and placed in positions A4 and B4, respectively. Teams were then drawn from Pot 2 and assigned to positions A3, B3, A2, and B2, respectively, followed by the teams from Pot 1 being placed in positions A1 and B1, respectively.

Pot 1	Pot 2	Pot 3
New Zealand; Papua New Guinea	Solomon Islands; Fiji; Samoa; Vanuatu	New Caledonia; (N/A) First round winner (Note: The first round winner was not known at the time of the second round draw.)

== Schedule ==
The schedule of the competition is as follows:

Round	Matchday	Date	Venue(s)
First round	Matchday 1	28 November 2025	Cook Islands
First round	Matchday 2	1 December 2025	Cook Islands
Second round	Matchday 3	27 February 2026	Solomon Islands Fiji
Second round	Matchday 4	2 March 2025	Solomon Islands Fiji
Second round	Matchday 5	5 March 2026	Solomon Islands Fiji
Third round	Semi-finals	11 April 2026	New Zealand
Third round	Final	15 April 2026	New Zealand

== First round ==
The four lowest-ranked teams competed to advance to the second round. All matches were held in Avarua.

=== Bracket ===
Matchday 1
28 November 2025 – Matavera
Tonga	0
American Samoa	3
28 November 2025 – Matavera
Tahiti	0
Cook Islands	1

Matchday 2
1 December 2025 – Matavera
American Samoa	4
Cook Islands	0

=== Matchday 1 ===
28 November 2025
11:00 UTC−10

Tonga	0–3	American Samoa
	Report (FIFA); Report (OFC)	Drago 45+3', 76'; Tu'ua 90+5'

CIFA Academy Field, Matavera, Cook Islands
Attendance: 100
Referee: Beth Rattray (New Zealand)

28 November 2025
15:00 UTC−10

Tahiti	0–1	Cook Islands
	Report (FIFA); Report (OFC)	Rouru 79'

CIFA Academy Field, Matavera, Cook Islands
Attendance: 300
Referee: Shama Maemae (Solomon Islands)

=== Matchday 2 ===
The winner advanced to the second round.

1 December 2025
12:00 UTC−10

American Samoa	4–0	Cook Islands
Patea 22'; Mana'o 36'; Fuamatu-Ma'afala 44'; Summers 49'	Report (FIFA); Report (OFC)

CIFA Academy Field, Matavera, Cook Islands
Attendance: 100
Referee: Anna-Marie Keighley (New Zealand)

== Second round ==
Second round matches were held between 27 February and 8 March 2026. Teams played a single round-robin format with Group A hosted in Solomon Islands and Group B in Fiji.

=== Group A ===
Pos	Team	Pld	W	D	L	GF	GA	GD	Pts	Qualification	(New Zealand)	(American Samoa)	(Samoa)	(Solomon Islands)
1	New Zealand	3	3	0	0	19	0	+19	9	Advance to the third round	—	—	8–0	8–0
2	American Samoa	3	2	0	1	2	3	−1	6	Advance to the third round	0–3	—	1–0	—
3	Samoa	3	1	0	2	2	10	−8	3		—	—	—	2–1
4	Solomon Islands (H)	3	0	0	3	1	11	−10	0		—	0–1	—	—

Source: OFC
(H) Hosts
27 February 2026
13:00 UTC+11

New Zealand	8–0	Samoa
Brown 1', 14', 38'; Kitching 65'; Aisei 81' (o.g.); Elliott 83', 90'; Jackson 90+6'	Report (OFC); Report (FIFA)

National Stadium, Honiara
Attendance: 200
Referee: Mu Mingxin (China)
27 February 2026
17:00 UTC+11

Solomon Islands	0–1	American Samoa
	Report (OFC); Report (FIFA)	Fuamatu-Ma'afala 56'

National Stadium, Honiara
Attendance: 300
Referee: Torika Delai (Fiji)

2 March 2026
13:00 UTC+11

American Samoa	1–0	Samoa
Patea 45+2'	Report (OFC); Report (FIFA)

National Stadium, Honiara
Attendance: 150
Referee: Khin Nyein Chan (Myanmar)
2 March 2026
17:00 UTC+11

New Zealand	8–0	Solomon Islands
Clegg 3', 78'; Riley 8'; Blake 16', 63', 70'; Jale 61'; Vlok 72'	Report (OFC); Report (FIFA)

National Stadium, Honiara
Attendance: 400
Referee: Gulshoda Saidqulova (Uzbekistan)

5 March 2026
13:00 UTC+11

American Samoa	0–3	New Zealand
	Report (OFC); Report (FIFA)	Brown 44' (pen.); Bunge 51'; Riley 71'

National Stadium, Honiara
Attendance: 200
Referee: Mu Mingxin (China)
5 March 2026
17:00 UTC+11

Samoa	2–1	Solomon Islands
Jessop 36'; Nari 78' (o.g.)	Report (OFC); Report (FIFA)	Pegi 63'

National Stadium, Honiara
Attendance: 400
Referee: Torika Delai (Fiji)

=== Group B ===
Pos	Team	Pld	W	D	L	GF	GA	GD	Pts	Qualification	(Papua New Guinea)	(Fiji)	(New Caledonia)	(Vanuatu)
1	Papua New Guinea	3	3	0	0	10	0	+10	9	Advance to the third round	—	1–0 (Note: Match was originally scheduled for 2 March 2026, but was postponed due to severe weather and rescheduled to 8 March.)	—	5–0
2	Fiji (H)	3	2	0	1	6	1	+5	6	Advance to the third round	—	—	5–0	—
3	New Caledonia	3	1	0	2	2	10	−8	3		0–4	—	—	2–1
4	Vanuatu	3	0	0	3	1	8	−7	0		—	0–1	—	—

Source: OFC
(H) Hosts
Notes:
27 February 2026
12:00 UTC+12

Papua New Guinea	5–0	Vanuatu
Padio 5'; Elipas 16', 90'; Kaipu 44'; Pala 62'	Report (OFC); Report (FIFA)

Govind Park, Ba
Attendance: 100
Referee: Shaman Maemae (Solomon Islands)
27 February 2026
16:00 UTC+12

Fiji	5–0	New Caledonia
Davis 11'; Diyalowai 28', 45+4'; Nasau 36'; Alfred 75'	Report (OFC); Report (FIFA)

Govind Park, Ba
Attendance: 150
Referee: Sarah Jones (New Zealand)

2 March 2026
12:00 UTC+12

New Caledonia	2–1	Vanuatu
Dralu 14'; Hmae 34'	Report (OFC); Report (FIFA)	Simon 83'

Govind Park, Ba
Attendance: 50
Referee: Beth Rattray (New Zealand)

5 March 2026
12:00 UTC+12

New Caledonia	0–4	Papua New Guinea
	Report (OFC); Report (FIFA)	A. Gunemba 73'; Kalapai 90'; M. Gunemba 90+4'; Maneo 90+6'

Govind Park, Ba
Attendance: 50
Referee: Anna-Marie Keighley (New Zealand)
5 March 2026
16:00 UTC+12

Vanuatu	0–1	Fiji
	Report (OFC); Report (FIFA)	Diyalowai 20'

Govind Park, Ba
Attendance: 150
Referee: Sarah Jones (New Zealand)

8 March 2026
12:00 UTC+12

Papua New Guinea	1–0	Fiji
M. Gunemba 86'	Report (OFC); Report (FIFA)

Govind Park, Ba
Attendance: 150
Referee: Beth Rattray (New Zealand)

== Third round ==
The second round group winners and runners-up competed in a single-leg knockout round in New Zealand to determine the team qualifying directly for the 2027 FIFA Women's World Cup and the Oceanian representative to the inter-confederation play-offs. The semi-finals were played at FMG Stadium Waikato, Hamilton on 11 April, and the final was played at North Harbour Stadium, Auckland on 15 April.

=== Bracket ===
Semi-finals
11 April 2026
Papua New Guinea	1
American Samoa	0
11 April 2026
New Zealand	5
Fiji	0

Final
15 April 2026
Papua New Guinea	0
New Zealand	1

=== Semi-finals ===
11 April 2026
12:10 (UTC+12)

Papua New Guinea	1–0	American Samoa
Kalapai 45+1'	Report (FIFA); Report (OFC)

FMG Stadium Waikato, Hamilton
Attendance: 481
Referee: Anna-Marie Keighley (New Zealand)

11 April 2026
16:10 (UTC+12)

New Zealand	5–0	Fiji
Brown 5'; Taylor 21'; Foster 27'; Kitching 38'; Blake 74'	Report (FIFA); Report (OFC)

FMG Stadium Waikato, Hamilton
Attendance: 3,267
Referee: Shama Maemae (Solomon Islands)

=== Final ===
The winner qualified for the 2027 FIFA Women's World Cup, and the runner-up advanced to the inter-confederation play-offs.

15 April 2026
19:00 (UTC+12)

Papua New Guinea	0–1	New Zealand
	Report (FIFA); Report (OFC)	Kitching 55'

North Harbour Stadium, Auckland
Attendance: 3,984
Referee: Torika Delai (Fiji)

== Goalscorers ==
There were 58 goals scored in 18 matches, for an average of 3.22 goals per match.

5 goals

- (New Zealand) Kelli Brown

4 goals

- (New Zealand) Hannah Blake

3 goals

- (Fiji) Sofi Diyalowai
- (New Zealand) Katie Kitching

2 goals

- (American Samoa) Cassidy Pamela Drago
- (American Samoa) Alayna Fuamatu-Ma'afala
- (American Samoa) Morgan Patea
- (New Zealand) Milly Clegg
- (New Zealand) Manaia Elliott
- (New Zealand) Indiah-Paige Riley
- (Papua New Guinea) Nenny Elipas
- (Papua New Guinea) Meagen Gunemba
- (Papua New Guinea) Keren Kalapai

1 goal

- (American Samoa) Alma Mana'o
- (American Samoa) Mattyn Summers
- (American Samoa) Aaliyah Tu'ua
- (Cook Islands) Tearoa Rouru
- (Fiji) Sonia Alfred
- (Fiji) Trina Davis
- (Fiji) Cema Nasau
- (New Caledonia) Kané Dralu
- (New Caledonia) Léana Hmae
- (New Zealand) Claudia Bunge
- (New Zealand) Deven Jackson
- (New Zealand) Grace Jale
- (New Zealand) Kate Taylor
- (New Zealand) Michaela Foster
- (New Zealand) Pia Vlok
- (Papua New Guinea) Anastasia Gunemba
- (Papua New Guinea) Marie Kaipu
- (Papua New Guinea) Calista Maneo
- (Papua New Guinea) Ramona Padio
- (Papua New Guinea) Phylis Pala
- (Samoa) Malia Jessop
- (Solomon Islands) Ileen Pegi
- (Vanuatu) Leimata Simon

1 own goal

- (Samoa) Georgia Aisei (against New Zealand)
- (Solomon Islands) Edith Nari (against Samoa)
