= 2025 OFC Women's Nations Cup =

Football tournament in Oceania

Tournament details
- Host country: Fiji
- Dates: 4–19 July 2025
- Teams: 8 (from 1 confederation)
- Venues: 2 (in 2 host cities)

Final positions
- Champions: Solomon Islands (1st title)
- Runners-up: Papua New Guinea
- Third place: Samoa
- Fourth place: Fiji

Tournament statistics
- Matches played: 18
- Goals scored: 57 (3.17 per match)
- Top scorer(s): (Papua New Guinea) Marie Kaipu (Vanuatu) Leimata Simon (5 goals each)
- Best player: (Papua New Guinea) Ramona Padio
- Best goalkeeper: (Solomon Islands) Zainab Donga
- Fair play award: Cook Islands

The 2025 OFC Women's Nations Cup was the 13th edition of the OFC Women's Nations Cup, the quadrennial international football championship organised by the Oceania Football Confederation (OFC) for the women's national teams of the Oceanian region. As with the previous tournament, it was held in Fiji. It took place between 4 and 19 July 2025.

Papua New Guinea were the defending champions but they lost to Solomon Islands 2–3 (a.e.t.) in the final.

== Format ==
The format will follow:

- Final tournament: A total of eight teams will play in the tournament, which will be held in July 2025 in Fiji. For the group stage, they will be divided into two groups of four teams. The top two teams of each group will advance to the knockout stage (quarter-finals, semi-finals, positional play-offds and final) to decide the winner of the OFC Women's Nations Cup, however the winner will no longer qualify for the FIFA Women's World Cup with OFC instead opting to organise a separate qualifiers tournament.

== Teams ==
The following teams entered the final tournament alongside host Fiji.

Team	App	First	Last	Best performance	World Rankings
Cook Islands	6th	2003	2022	Third place (2010, 2014)	115
Fiji	6th	1983	2022	Runners-up (2018, 2022)	72
Papua New Guinea	11th	1989	2022	Champions (2022)	56
Samoa	5th	1998	2022	Fourth place (2003, 2022)	98
Solomon Islands	4th	2007	2022	Third place (2022)	86
Tahiti	4th	2010	2022	Quarter-finals (2022)	114
Tonga	6th	2007	2022	Third place (2007)	93
Vanuatu	3rd	2010	2022	Group stage (2010, 2022)	120

Teams do not enter in the competition:

- American Samoa
- New Caledonia
- New Zealand

== Venues ==
2025 OFC Women's Nations Cup is located in Fiji	Lautoka	Suva
2025 OFC Women's Nations Cup is located in Fiji	Churchill Park	HFC Bank Stadium
2025 OFC Women's Nations Cup is located in Fiji	Capacity: 18,000	Capacity: 15,446

== Draw ==
The final draw took place at 18:00 NZST on 18 March 2025 at the OFC Home of Football - Te Kahu o Kiwa in Auckland, New Zealand. OFC Women's Football Manager Ashleigh Cox and Media and Communications Manager Matt Brown conducted and presented the draw. The draw began with Pot 3, with all teams from this pot allocated before proceeding to Pot 2 and then Pot 1. Teams were drawn sequentially, with the first team placed in Group A and the second in Group B.

=== Seeding ===
The seeding for the draw was based on the FIFA Women's World Ranking of December 2024.

Pot 1	Pot 2	Pot 3
Papua New Guinea (56); Fiji (72)	Solomon Islands (87); Tonga (95); Samoa (100); Tahiti (113)	Cook Islands (114); Vanuatu (121)

== Group stage ==
All match times are local (UTC+12).

=== Group A ===
Pos	Team	Pld	W	D	L	GF	GA	GD	Pts	Qualification
1	Papua New Guinea	3	2	1	0	11	2	+9	7	Semifinals
2	Samoa	3	2	0	1	7	3	+4	6	Semifinals
3	Tahiti	3	0	2	1	3	5	−2	2	Fifth place game
4	Cook Islands	3	0	1	2	1	12	−11	1	Seventh place game

Source: OFC
Rules for classification: Group stage tiebreakers
4 July 2025
12:00

Tahiti	1–1	Cook Islands
K. Mai 63'	Report	Rouru 28'

Churchill Park, Lautoka
Attendance: 200
Referee: Torika Delai (Fiji)
4 July 2025
15:00

Papua New Guinea	2–1	Samoa
Kaipu 19', 40'	Report	Xev. Salanoa 84'

Churchill Park, Lautoka
Attendance: 200
Referee: Shama Maemae (Solomon Islands)

7 July 2025
12:00

Cook Islands	0–3	Samoa
	Report	Xev. Salanoa 3'; Dowsing 12'; Fischer 58'

Churchill Park, Lautoka
Attendance: 200
Referee: Torika Delai (Fiji)
7 July 2025
15:00

Papua New Guinea	1–1	Tahiti
Samuel 51'	Report	Wong 45+4' (pen.)

Churchill Park, Lautoka
Attendance: 200
Referee: Jovita Ambrose (Solomon Islands)

10 July 2025
12:00

Samoa	3–1	Tahiti
Skeers 6' (pen.); Kitiona 18'; Jessop 75'	Report	Teore 38'

Churchill Park, Lautoka
Attendance: 200
Referee: Torika Delai (Fiji)
10 July 2025
15:00

Cook Islands	0–8	Papua New Guinea
	Report	Butubu 4'; Kaipu 9', 30', 39'; Pala 14'; Kalapai 15', 70'; Padio 58'

Churchill Park, Lautoka
Attendance: 200
Referee: Yantama Atoa (Tonga)

=== Group B ===
Pos	Team	Pld	W	D	L	GF	GA	GD	Pts	Qualification
1	Solomon Islands	3	2	0	1	9	4	+5	6	Semifinals
2	Fiji (H)	3	2	0	1	6	3	+3	6	Semifinals
3	Vanuatu	3	2	0	1	5	2	+3	6	Fifth place game
4	Tonga	3	0	0	3	0	11	−11	0	Seventh place game

Source: OFC
Rules for classification: Group stage tiebreakers
(H) Hosts
5 July 2025
16:00

Tonga	0–3	Vanuatu
	Report	Simon 22', 45+3', 53'

HFC Bank Stadium, Suva
Attendance: 100
Referee: Kyllian Lelarge (New Caledonia)
5 July 2025
19:00

Fiji	3–2	Solomon Islands
Leba 40'; Nasau 50', 63'	Report	Solosaia 8', 42'

HFC Bank Stadium, Suva
Attendance: 803
Referee: Sarah Jones (New Zealand)

8 July 2025
16:00

Vanuatu	1–2	Solomon Islands
Simon 82'	Report	Pegi 18' (pen.); Arukau 57'

HFC Bank Stadium, Suva
Attendance: 200
Referee: Kyllian Lelarge (New Caledonia)
8 July 2025
19:00

Fiji	3–0	Tonga
Nasau 30'; Naweni 80'; Lauteau 90+8' (o.g.)	Report

HFC Bank Stadium, Suva
Attendance: 599
Referee: Peter Olomaga (Samoa)

11 July 2025
16:00

Solomon Islands	5–0	Tonga
Arukau 8', 85'; Pegi 28', 41'; David 77'	Report

HFC Bank Stadium, Suva
Attendance: 200
Referee: Keith Kitumbing (Papua New Guinea)
11 July 2025
19:00

Vanuatu	1–0	Fiji
Simon 32'	Report

HFC Bank Stadium, Suva
Attendance: 827
Referee: Sarah Jones (New Zealand)

== Knockout stage ==
=== Bracket ===
Semi-finals
16 July – Suva
Papua New Guinea	2
Fiji	1
16 July – Suva
Solomon Islands	2
Samoa	1

Final
19 July – Suva
Papua New Guinea	2
Solomon Islands (a.e.t.)	3
Third place
19 July – Suva
Fiji	0
Samoa	2

Fifth place
14 July – Suva
Tahiti	0
Vanuatu	1
Seventh place
14 July – Suva
Cook Islands	0
Tonga	1

=== Seventh place match ===
14 July 2025
15:30

Cook Islands	0–1	Tonga
	Report	Hausia-Haugen 90'

HFC Bank Stadium, Suva
Attendance: 100
Referee: Jovita Ambrose (Solomon Islands)

=== Fifth place match ===
14 July 2025
19:00

Tahiti	0–1	Vanuatu
	Report	Poida 28'

HFC Bank Stadium, Suva
Attendance: 165
Referee: Yantama Atoa (Tonga)

=== Semi-finals ===
16 July 2025
15:00

Papua New Guinea	2–1	Fiji
Kalapai 26'; Padio 33'	Report	Leba 34'

HFC Bank Stadium, Suva
Attendance: 600
Referee: Kyllian Lelarge (New Caledonia)

16 July 2025
19:00

Solomon Islands	2–1	Samoa
Pegi 22'; B. Kitiona 33' (o.g.)	Report	O. Kitiona 14'

HFC Bank Stadium, Suva
Attendance: 850
Referee: Torika Delai (Fiji)

=== Third place match ===
19 July 2025
15:30

Fiji	0–2	Samoa
	Report	Dowsing 8', 16'

HFC Bank Stadium, Suva
Attendance: 400
Referee: Shama Maemae (Solomon Islands)

=== Final ===
19 July 2025
19:00

Papua New Guinea	2–3 (a.e.t.)	Solomon Islands
Padio 42', 65'	Report	Solosaia 18'; Arukau 45+3'; David 94'

HFC Bank Stadium, Suva
Attendance: 1,150
Referee: Sarah Jones (New Zealand)

== Statistics ==
=== Goalscorers ===
There were 57 goals scored in 18 matches, for an average of 3.17 goals per match.

5 goals

- (Papua New Guinea) Marie Kaipu
- (Vanuatu) Leimata Simon

4 goals

- (Papua New Guinea) Ramona Padio
- (Solomon Islands) Madeline Arukau
- (Solomon Islands) Ileen Pegi

3 goals

- (Fiji) Cema Nasau
- (Papua New Guinea) Keren Kalapai
- (Solomon Islands) Lorina Solosaia

2 goals

- (Fiji) Narieta Leba
- (Samoa) Lilly Dowsing
- (Samoa) Oteta Kitiona
- (Samoa) Xevani Salanoa
- (Solomon Islands) Jemina David

1 goal

- (Cook Islands) Tearoa Rouru
- (Fiji) Sereana Naweni
- (Papua New Guinea) Michaelyn Butubu
- (Papua New Guinea) Phyllis Pala
- (Papua New Guinea) Raynata Samuel
- (Samoa) Lilly Dowsing
- (Samoa) Monique Fischer
- (Samoa) Malia Jessop
- (Samoa) Arianna Skeers
- (French Polynesia) Kohai Mai
- (French Polynesia) Tauhere Teore
- (French Polynesia) Kiani Wong
- (Tonga) Leila Hausia-Haugen
- (Vanuatu) Angelina Poida

1 own goal

- (Samoa) Breanna Kitiona (against Solomon Islands)
- (Tonga) Ana Lauteau (against Fiji)

== Awards ==
2025 OFC Women's Nations Cup winners

Solomon Islands
First title

Award	Winner
Golden Ball	(Papua New Guinea) Ramona Padio
Golden Boot	(Papua New Guinea) Marie Kaipu
Golden Glove	(Solomon Islands) Zainab Donga
Fair Play	Cook Islands
