= Indiah-Paige Riley =

New Zealand women's football player

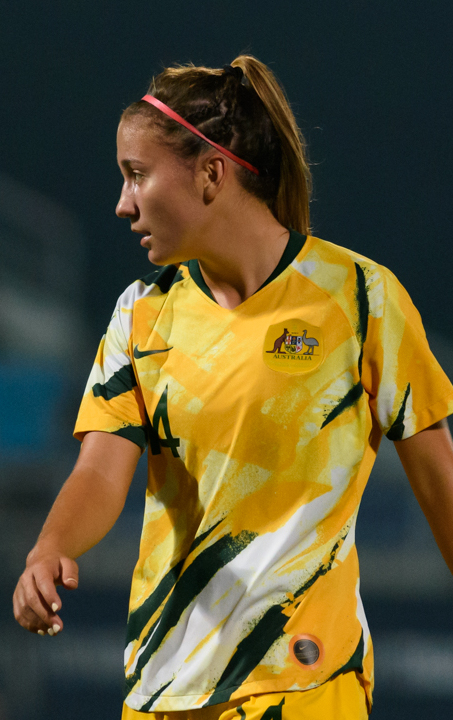

Personal information
- Full name: Indiah-Paige Janita Riley
- Date of birth: 20 December 2001 (age 24)
- Place of birth: Auckland, New Zealand
- Height: 1.71 m (5 ft 7 in)
- Position: Forward

Team information
- Current team: Wellington Phoenix
- Number: 17

Youth career
- 2013–2014: The Lakes Football Club
- 2015–2016: Moreton Bay United

Senior career*
Years	Team	Apps	(Gls)
2018–2020	Brisbane Roar	20	(3)
2020–2023	Fortuna Hjørring	52	(7)
2023	Brisbane Roar	11	(1)
2023–2024	PSV	19	(7)
2024–2026	Crystal Palace	29	(2)
2026–	Wellington Phoenix	5	(2)

International career^{‡}
2017	Australia U17	1	(0)
2019	Australia U20	5	(1)
2021	Australia	1	(0)
2022–	New Zealand	37	(9)
- * Club domestic league appearances and goals as of 16 November 2026 ‡ National team caps and goals as of 6 March 2026

Indiah-Paige Janita Riley (born 20 December 2001) is a New Zealand professional women's footballer who plays as a striker for A-League Women club Wellington Phoenix. She has previously played for Crystal Palace in the Women's Super League 2, Fortuna Hjorring in the Elitedivisionen, PSV Vrouwen in the Eredivisie Vrouwen and Brisbane Roar. A former one-time international for the Australia women's national soccer team, Riley plays for the New Zealand women's national football team.

== Club career ==
=== Brisbane Roar ===
Indiah-Paige Riley made her professional debut on 4 November 2018 for Brisbane Roar against the Western Sydney Wanderers coming on as a substitute for Allira Toby in a 1–0 win.

She was nominated for the W-League's Young Player of the Year award in the 2019–20 W-League season.

=== Fortuna Hjorring ===
Riley signed for Danish champions Fortuna Hjorring on 3 August 2020.

=== Return to Brisbane Roar ===
In January 2023, Riley returned to Australia, signing with former club Brisbane Roar until the end of the 2022–23 A-League Women season.

=== PSV ===
In August 2023, PSV announced the signing of Riley on a two-year contract. Riley made her debut for the club on 9 September 2023 and marked it with a goal.

=== Crystal Palace ===
On August 7 2024, Riley signed a two year deal with WSL club Crystal Palace. In May 2026, it was announced that Riley would depart Palace on the expiration of her contract.

=== Wellington Phoenix ===
Riley playing for Wellington Phoenix in 2026

In August 2026, Riley returned to the A-League Women, signing a two-year contract with Wellington Phoenix.

== International career ==
Born in New Zealand, Riley moved to Australia at the age of 7 and is a dual-citizen. After previously representing Australia, Riley decided to commit her international career and switch for New Zealand. She received her first call-up with New Zealand for two friendly games vs Mexico and Philippines on 2 and 6 September 2022 and started in her debut with New Zealand and played a full game in first game aforementioned.

=== 2023 FIFA Women's World Cup ===
In June 2023, Riley was selected as part of the Football Ferns squad for the 2023 FIFA Women's World Cup, which was to be co-hosted in Australia and New Zealand. She featured in all three group stage matches, before New Zealand's exit from the competition.

=== 2024 Summer Olympics ===
On 4 July 2024, Riley was called up to the New Zealand squad for the 2024 Summer Olympics.

== Career statistics ==
=== Club ===
As of 22 April 2021

Club	Season	League			Cup^{1}		Continental^{2}		Total	
Club	Season	Division	Apps	Goals	Apps	Goals	Apps	Goals	Apps	Goals
Brisbane Roar	2018–19	W-League	10	1	—		—		10	1
Brisbane Roar	2019–20	W-League	10	2	—		—		10	2
Brisbane Roar	Total		20	3	—		—		20	3
Fortuna Hjørring	2020–21	Elitedivisionen	19	3	0	0	4	0	23	3
Fortuna Hjørring	2021–22	Elitedivisionen	20	4	5	1	—		25	5
Fortuna Hjørring	2022–23	Elitedivisionen	13	0	0	0	2	0	15	0
Fortuna Hjørring	Total		52	7	5	1	6	0	63	8
Career total			72	10	5	1	6	0	83	11

^{1}Danish Women's Cup.

^{2}UEFA Women's Champions League

== International goals ==
No.	Date	Venue	Opponent	Score	Result	Competition
1.	13 February 2024	FFS Football Stadium, Apia, Samoa	Vanuatu	3–0	5–0	2024 OFC Women's Olympic Qualifying Tournament
2.	13 February 2024	FFS Football Stadium, Apia, Samoa	Vanuatu	4–0	5–0	2024 OFC Women's Olympic Qualifying Tournament
3.	16 February 2024	FFS Football Stadium, Apia, Samoa	Fiji	1–0	7–1	2024 OFC Women's Olympic Qualifying Tournament
4.	16 February 2024	FFS Football Stadium, Apia, Samoa	Fiji	5–0	7–1	2024 OFC Women's Olympic Qualifying Tournament
5.	19 February 2024	FFS Football Stadium, Apia, Samoa	Solomon Islands	5–0	11–1	2024 OFC Women's Olympic Qualifying Tournament
6.	19 February 2024	FFS Football Stadium, Apia, Samoa	Solomon Islands	6–0	11–1	2024 OFC Women's Olympic Qualifying Tournament
7.	23 February 2025	Estadio Piedades de Santa Ana, Santa Ana, Costa Rica	Costa Rica	1–1	1–1	Friendly
8.	2 March 2026	National Stadium, Honiara, Solomon Islands	Solomon Islands	2–0	8–0	2027 FIFA Women's World Cup qualification
9.	5 March 2026	National Stadium, Honiara, Solomon Islands	American Samoa	3–0	3–0	2027 FIFA Women's World Cup qualification
