= Gwendoline Fournier =

French Polynesian footballer (born 1991)

Personal information
- Date of birth: 16 April 1991 (age 35)
- Place of birth: Nuku Hiva, French Polynesia
- Position: Defender

International career^{‡}
Years	Team	Apps	(Gls)
	Tahiti	3	(0)
- ‡ National team caps and goals as of 22 May 2023

Gwendoline Teuu Fournier (born 16 April 1991) is a French Polynesian women's footballer who plays as a defender. She is captain of the Tahiti women's national football team.

Fournier is from Nuku Hiva in the Marquesas Islands and works as a PE teacher. She began playing football at the age of 7, but gave it up when she moved to France for her education. She restarted when she returned to French Polynesia in 2015, initially playing Futsal and then women's football. She was selected for the Tahiti national team after playing at the festival of the islands, and was subsequently selected for the team to contest the 2019 Pacific Games in Apia. She captained the team for the 2022 OFC Women's Nations Cup.

Fournier featured with women's footballers Kiani Wong and Camille Andre on a stamp to celebrate international women's day 2023.

== See also ==
- Football in French Polynesia
