= Monique Fischer =

Samoan footballer

Personal information
- Full name: Monique Moana Fischer
- Date of birth: 19 December 1991 (age 34)
- Place of birth: Auckland, New Zealand
- Position: Midfielder

Team information
- Current team: Tavagnacco

Senior career*
Years	Team	Apps	(Gls)
- Papatoetoe AFC
- Auckland Football
2017–2018	Cardiff Met.		
2018–2019	Yeovil Town	4	(0)
2019–2020	Chieti	12	(1)
2020	Lugano		
2020	Mallbackens IF	13	(1)
2021	Juan Grande	3	(0)
2021–2022	Lugano	12	(0)
2022–	Tavagnacco	0	(0)

International career^{‡}
2015–	Samoa	5	(5)
- * Club domestic league appearances and goals as of 17 December 2025 ‡ National team caps and goals as of 31 March 2025

Monique Moana Fischer (born 19 December 1991) is a New Zealand-born Samoan professional footballer who plays as a midfielder for Italian Serie B club UPC Tavagnacco and the Samoa women's national team. At club level, she previously played in the English FA Women's Super League for Yeovil Town and in Sweden.

== Club career ==
Fischer played club football for Papatoetoe AFC and represented Auckland Football in the National Women's League (New Zealand) while working as a journalist for TVNZ. After moving to the United Kingdom to pursue a professional football career, she signed for Welsh Premier Women's Football League club Cardiff Met. in 2017.

In September 2018, Fischer made her professional debut for Yeovil Town against Tottenham Hotspur in the 2018–19 FA Women's League Cup. She suffered a clavicle fracture in Yeovil's next match, a 7–0 defeat by Arsenal. Yeovil finished a distant last in the 2018–19 FA WSL and incurred a 10-point penalty for insolvency. The club was then kicked out of the top two Leagues when The FA rejected their purported business plan. Fischer signed for Champions League qualifying Swiss Club Lugano FFC in January 2020 in the Serie A.

== International career ==
At international level Fischer has played for the Samoa women's national football team, including at the 2015 Pacific Games in Port Moresby.

== International goals ==
No.	Date	Venue	Opponent	Score	Result	Competition
1.	13 July 2022	ANZ Stadium, Suva, Fiji	Tonga	1–0	2–0	2022 OFC Women's Nations Cup
2.	23 July 2022	ANZ Stadium, Suva, Fiji	New Caledonia	1–0	4–2	2022 OFC Women's Nations Cup
3.	30 July 2022	ANZ Stadium, Suva, Fiji	Solomon Islands	1–0	1–1 (5–6 p)	2022 OFC Women's Nations Cup
4.	13 February 2024	FFS Football Stadium, Apia, Samoa	Tonga	1–0	2–0	2024 OFC Women's Olympic Football Tournament
5.	7 July 2025	Churchill Park, Lautoka, Fiji	Cook Islands	3–0	3–0	2025 OFC Women's Nations Cup
