= Vaihei Samin =

Tahitian footballer (born 2001)

Personal information
- Date of birth: 15 September 2001 (age 25)
- Place of birth: Papeete, Tahiti
- Position: Forward

Team information
- Current team: Fleury
- Number: 3

Youth career
- Paris FC
- 2019–2020: Fleury

Senior career*
Years	Team	Apps	(Gls)
2020–	Fleury	7	(0)

International career
	Tahiti	3	(1)
- * Club domestic league appearances and goals

Vaihei Samin (born 15 September 2001) is a Tahitian footballer who plays as a forward for the Tahiti women's national team.

Samin is the daughter of former Tahiti goalkeeper Xavier Samin and the granddaughter of women's football pioneer Leila Marmouyet. She has played football since she was seven years old. In Tahiti she played for A.S. Tefana.

In 2017 she travelled to France to seek selection with a French team, and was recruited by the Tours hope centre. In 2019 she joined Division 1 Féminine team Fleury.

She was selected for the Tahiti women's national team for the 2019 Pacific Games in Apia, Samoa. She declined selection for the 2022 OFC Women's Nations Cup in order to focus on her career in France.
