= Ramona Padio =

Papua New Guinean footballer

Personal information
- Full name: Ramona Quintina Padio
- Date of birth: 13 March 1998 (age 28)
- Place of birth: Papua New Guinea
- Position: Midfielder

Team information
- Current team: Hekari United

Youth career
- –2016: Kimbe Eagles FC

Senior career*
Years	Team	Apps	(Gls)
2018	21 Lakers FC		
2022	Port Moresby Strikers		
2023–	Hekari United	4	(2)

International career^{‡}
2015–2017	Papua New Guinea U20	8	(3)
2018–	Papua New Guinea	24	(31)
Medal record
Women's football
Representing Papua New Guinea
OFC Women's Nations Cup
Winner	2022 Fiji
Runner-up	2025 Fiji
Football at the Pacific Games
Winner	2019 Apia
Winner	2023 Honiara
FAS Tri-Nations Series
Winner	2022 Singapore
- * Club domestic league appearances and goals ‡ National team caps and goals as of 02 December 2023

Ramona Quintina Padio (born 13 March 1998) is a footballer from Papua New Guinea. She has played for the Papua New Guinea national team in the under-20, and senior levels. She was part of the Papua New Guinea squad for the 2016 FIFA U-20 Women's World Cup.

== International career ==
Padio was a member of the Papua New Guinea squad for the 2016 FIFA U-20 Women's World Cup. the country's first FIFA tournament.

Padio made her international debut for Papua New Guinea Senior team in their 5–0 win against Samoa as part of the 2018 OFC Women's Nations Cup.

Padio was the top goal-scorer in the Pacific Games in Apia 2019 and Honiara 2023, scoring 9 and 11 goals respectively.

== International goals ==
Scores and results list Papua New Guinea's goal tally first.

No.	Date	Venue	Opponent	Score	Result	Competition
1.	21 November 2018	Stade Yoshida, Koné, New Caledonia	New Caledonia	3–0	6–2	2018 OFC Women's Nations Cup
2.	24 November 2018	Stade Yoshida, Koné, New Caledonia	Tahiti	2–1	3–1	2018 OFC Women's Nations Cup
3.	24 November 2018	Stade Yoshida, Koné, New Caledonia	Tahiti	3–1	3–1	2018 OFC Women's Nations Cup
4.	8 July 2019	J.S. Blatter Soccer Stadium, Apia, Samoa	Solomon Islands	2–1	5–2	2019 Pacific Games
5.	8 July 2019	J.S. Blatter Soccer Stadium, Apia, Samoa	Solomon Islands	3–1	5–2	2019 Pacific Games
6.	12 July 2019	J.S. Blatter Soccer Stadium, Apia, Samoa	Tahiti	3–1	4–0	2019 Pacific Games
7.	12 July 2019	J.S. Blatter Soccer Stadium, Apia, Samoa	Tahiti	4–0	4–0	2019 Pacific Games
8.	15 July 2019	J.S. Blatter Soccer Stadium, Apia, Samoa	Vanuatu	4–1	6–1	2019 Pacific Games
9.	15 July 2019	J.S. Blatter Soccer Stadium, Apia, Samoa	Vanuatu	5–1	6–1	2019 Pacific Games
10.	15 July 2019	J.S. Blatter Soccer Stadium, Apia, Samoa	Vanuatu	6–1	6–1	2019 Pacific Games
11.	18 July 2019	J.S. Blatter Soccer Stadium, Apia, Samoa	Cook Islands	2–0	5–1	2019 Pacific Games
12.	20 July 2019	J.S. Blatter Soccer Stadium, Apia, Samoa	Samoa	3–1	3–1	2019 Pacific Games
13.	8 April 2022	Jalan Besar Stadium, Kallang, Singapore	Seychelles	7–0	9–0	2022 FAS Tri-Nations Series
14.	8 April 2022	Jalan Besar Stadium, Kallang, Singapore	Seychelles	8–0	9–0	2022 FAS Tri-Nations Series
15.	9 July 2022	Uprising Resort Football Park, Pacific Harbour, Fiji	Solomon Islands	2–0	5–0	Friendly
16.	14 July 2022	ANZ Stadium, Suva, Fiji	Vanuatu	2–1	3–1	2022 OFC Women's Nations Cup
17.	17 July 2022	ANZ Stadium, Suva, Fiji	Tahiti	1–0	2–1	2022 OFC Women's Nations Cup
18.	23 July 2022	ANZ Stadium, Suva, Fiji	Tonga	1–1	3–3 |	2022 OFC Women's Nations Cup
19.	23 July 2022	ANZ Stadium, Suva, Fiji	Tonga	3–2	3–3 |	2022 OFC Women's Nations Cup
20.	30 July 2022	HFC Bank Stadium, Suva, Fiji	Fiji	2–0	2–1	2022 OFC Women's Nations Cup
21.	17 November 2023	SIFF Academy, Honiara, Solomon Islands	American Samoa	1–0	9–0	2023 Pacific Games
22.	17 November 2023	SIFF Academy, Honiara, Solomon Islands	American Samoa	2–0	9–0	2023 Pacific Games
23.	17 November 2023	SIFF Academy, Honiara, Solomon Islands	American Samoa	3–0	9–0	2023 Pacific Games
24.	17 November 2023	SIFF Academy, Honiara, Solomon Islands	American Samoa	5–0	9–0	2023 Pacific Games
25.	17 November 2023	SIFF Academy, Honiara, Solomon Islands	American Samoa	8–0	9–0	2023 Pacific Games
26.	17 November 2023	SIFF Academy, Honiara, Solomon Islands	American Samoa	9–0	9–0	2023 Pacific Games
27.	20 November 2023	SIFF Academy, Honiara, Solomon Islands	Cook Islands	1–0	3–0	2023 Pacific Games
28.	20 November 2023	SIFF Academy, Honiara, Solomon Islands	Cook Islands	2–0	3–0	2023 Pacific Games
29.	27 November 2023	SIFF Academy, Honiara, Solomon Islands	Samoa	1–0	5–1	2023 Pacific Games
30.	27 November 2023	SIFF Academy, Honiara, Solomon Islands	Samoa	2–0	5–1	2023 Pacific Games
31.	27 November 2023	SIFF Academy, Honiara, Solomon Islands	Samoa	5–1	5–1	2023 Pacific Games
32.	10 July 2025	Churchill Park, Lautoka, Fiji	Cook Islands	7–0	8–0	2025 OFC Women's Nations Cup
33.	16 July 2025	HFC Bank Stadium, Suva, Fiji	Fiji	2–0	2–1	2025 OFC Women's Nations Cup
34.	19 July 2025	HFC Bank Stadium, Suva, Fiji	Solomon Islands	1–1	2–3 (a.e.t.)	2025 OFC Women's Nations Cup
35.	19 July 2025	HFC Bank Stadium, Suva, Fiji	Solomon Islands	2–2	2–3 (a.e.t.)	2025 OFC Women's Nations Cup
36.	13 November 2025	PNG Football Stadium, Port Moresby, Papua New Guinea	Vanuatu	1–0	4–0	2025 MSG Prime Minister's Cup
37.	19 November 2025	Sir John Guise Stadium, Port Moresby, Papua New Guinea	Solomon Islands	2–0	5–0	2025 MSG Prime Minister's Cup
38.	19 November 2025	Sir John Guise Stadium, Port Moresby, Papua New Guinea	Solomon Islands	3–0	5–0	2025 MSG Prime Minister's Cup
39.	23 November 2025	Sir John Guise Stadium, Port Moresby, Papua New Guinea	Fiji	2–0	3–0	2025 MSG Prime Minister's Cup
40.	27 February 2026	Govind Park, Ba, Fiji	Vanuatu	1–0	5–0	2027 FIFA Women's World Cup qualification
Last updated 27 November 2023
