= Marie Kaipu =

Papua New Guinean footballer

Personal information
- Date of birth: 16 August 1997 (age 29)
- Position: Midfielder

Team information
- Current team: Hekari United Women

Senior career*
Years	Team	Apps	(Gls)
2020	Hekari United W	31	(90)

International career
2019–	Papua New Guinea	31	(35)
Medal record
Women's football
Representing Papua New Guinea
OFC Women's Nations Cup
Runner-up	2025 Fiji
- * Club domestic league appearances and goals

Marie Kaipu (born 16 August 1997) is a Papua New Guinean footballer who plays as a midfielder for POM FC and the Papua New Guinea women's national team.

== Career statistics ==
=== Club ===
As of 13 May 2025

Club	Season	Division	League		Continental		Total	
Club	Season	Division	Apps	Goals	Apps	Goals	Apps	Goals
Hekari United Women	2020-21	Women Conference Soccer League	10	29			10	29
Hekari United Women	2023	Women Conference Soccer League	9	10	4	9	13	19
Hekari United Women	2024-25	Women Conference Soccer League	11	48	8	8	19	56
Hekari United Women	2025	Women Conference Soccer League	1	3			1	3
Total career			31	90	12	17	43	107

== International goals ==
No.	Date	Venue	Opponent	Score	Result	Competition
1.	29 October 2014	Kalabond Oval, Kokopo, Papua New Guinea	Tonga	2–0	3–0	2014 OFC Women's Nations Cup
2.	29 October 2014	Kalabond Oval, Kokopo, Papua New Guinea	Tonga	3–0	3–0	2014 OFC Women's Nations Cup
3.	6 July 2015	Sir Hubert Murray Stadium, Port Moresby, Papua New Guinea	New Caledonia	1–0	1–0	2015 Pacific Games
4.	21 November 2018	Stade Yoshida, Koné, New Caledonia	New Caledonia	1–0	6–2	2018 OFC Women's Nations Cup
5.	21 November 2018	Stade Yoshida, Koné, New Caledonia	New Caledonia	2–0	6–2	2018 OFC Women's Nations Cup
6.	21 November 2018	Stade Yoshida, Koné, New Caledonia	New Caledonia	4–0	6–2	2018 OFC Women's Nations Cup
7.	21 November 2018	Stade Yoshida, Koné, New Caledonia	New Caledonia	5–1	6–2	2018 OFC Women's Nations Cup
8.	21 November 2018	Stade Yoshida, Koné, New Caledonia	New Caledonia	6–1	6–2	2018 OFC Women's Nations Cup
9.	15 July 2019	J.S. Blatter Soccer Stadium #2, Apia, Samoa	Vanuatu	1–0	6–1	2019 Pacific Games
10.	15 July 2019	J.S. Blatter Soccer Stadium #2, Apia, Samoa	Vanuatu	3–1	6–1	2019 Pacific Games
11.	20 July 2019	J.S. Blatter Soccer Stadium #2, Apia, Samoa	Samoa	1–0	3–1	2019 Pacific Games
12.	20 July 2019	J.S. Blatter Soccer Stadium #2, Apia, Samoa	Samoa	2–1	3–1	2019 Pacific Games
13.	8 April 2022	Jalan Besar Stadium, Kallang, Singapore	Seychelles	2–0	9–0	2022 FAS Tri-Nations Series
14.	8 April 2022	Jalan Besar Stadium, Kallang, Singapore	Seychelles	4–0	9–0	2022 FAS Tri-Nations Series
15.	14 July 2022	ANZ Stadium, Suva, Fiji	Vanuatu	1–0	3–1	2022 OFC Women's Nations Cup
16.	17 November 2023	SIFF Academy Field 1, Honiara, Solomon Islands	American Samoa	6–0	9–0	2023 Pacific Games
17.	17 November 2023	SIFF Academy Field 1, Honiara, Solomon Islands	American Samoa	7–0	9–0	2023 Pacific Games
18.	27 November 2023	Lawson Tama Stadium, Honiara, Solomon Islands	Samoa	3–0	5–1	2023 Pacific Games
19.	27 November 2023	Lawson Tama Stadium, Honiara, Solomon Islands	Samoa	4–1	5–1	2023 Pacific Games
20.	1 December 2023	National Stadium, Honiara, Solomon Islands	Fiji	2–0	4–1	2023 Pacific Games
21.	13 February 2024	FFS Football Stadium (Field 1), Apia, Samoa	American Samoa	1–0	9–0	2024 OFC Women's Olympic Qualifying Tournament
22.	13 February 2024	FFS Football Stadium (Field 1), Apia, Samoa	American Samoa	2–0	9–0	2024 OFC Women's Olympic Qualifying Tournament
23.	13 February 2024	FFS Football Stadium (Field 1), Apia, Samoa	American Samoa	3–0	9–0	2024 OFC Women's Olympic Qualifying Tournament
24.	13 February 2024	FFS Football Stadium (Field 1), Apia, Samoa	American Samoa	4–0	9–0	2024 OFC Women's Olympic Qualifying Tournament
25.	13 February 2024	FFS Football Stadium (Field 1), Apia, Samoa	American Samoa	5–0	9–0	2024 OFC Women's Olympic Qualifying Tournament
26.	13 February 2024	FFS Football Stadium (Field 1), Apia, Samoa	American Samoa	6–0	9–0	2024 OFC Women's Olympic Qualifying Tournament
27.	13 February 2024	FFS Football Stadium (Field 1), Apia, Samoa	American Samoa	7–0	9–0	2024 OFC Women's Olympic Qualifying Tournament
28.	30 May 2025	Sir John Guise Stadium, Port Moresby, Papau New Guinea	Fiji	1–1	2–2	Friendly
29.	1 June 2025	Sir John Guise Stadium, Port Moresby, Papau New Guinea	Fiji	1–0	1–3	Friendly
30.	4 July 2025	Churchill Park, Lautoka, Fiji	Samoa	1–0	2–1	2025 OFC Women's Nations Cup
31.	4 July 2025	Churchill Park, Lautoka, Fiji	Samoa	2–0	2–1	2025 OFC Women's Nations Cup
32.	10 July 2025	Churchill Park, Lautoka, Fiji	Cook Islands	2–0	8–0	2025 OFC Women's Nations Cup
33.	10 July 2025	Churchill Park, Lautoka, Fiji	Cook Islands	5–0	8–0	2025 OFC Women's Nations Cup
34.	10 July 2025	Churchill Park, Lautoka, Fiji	Cook Islands	6–0	8–0	2025 OFC Women's Nations Cup
35.	23 November 2025	Sir John Guise Stadium, Port Moresby, Papua New Guinea	Fiji	2–0	3–0	2025 MSG Prime Minister's Cup
36.	27 February 2026	Govind Park, Ba, Fiji	Vanuatu	3–0	5–0	2027 FIFA Women's World Cup qualification
37.	20 September 2026	HFC Bank Stadium, Suva, Fiji	New Caledonia	2–0	4–1	2026 MSG Prime Minister's Cup
38.	20 September 2026	HFC Bank Stadium, Suva, Fiji	New Caledonia	3–0	4–1	2026 MSG Prime Minister's Cup
