= Sofi Diyalowai =

Fijian footballer

Personal information
- Date of birth: 14 October 1993 (age 33)
- Position: Midfielder

Team information
- Current team: Labasa

Senior career*
Years	Team	Apps	(Gls)
2021	Labasa	41	(47)

International career^{‡}
2019–	Fiji	16	(8)
- * Club domestic league appearances and goals ‡ National team caps and goals as of 7 February 2025

Sofi Diyalowai (born 14 October 1993) is a Fijian footballer who plays as a midfielder for Labasa FC and the Fiji women's national team.

Diyalowai is from Natokalau in Ba. She started playing football in 2009, and became a referee in 2016. In 2013 she won the Fiji FA women football of the year award. In August 2018 she was named to the Fijian team for the 2018 OFC Women's Nations Cup. In 2019 she trialled for French club Stade De Reims.

She captained the team for the 2022 OFC Women's Nations Cup.

On 4 February 2024, Diyalowai was called up to the 2024 OFC Women's Olympic Qualifying Tournament.

== International goals ==
Scores and results list Fiji's goal tally first.

No.	Date	Venue	Opponent	Score	Result	Competition
1.	17 July 2022	ANZ Stadium, Suva, Fiji	New Caledonia	2–0	3–1	2022 OFC Women's Nations Cup
2.	17 July 2022	ANZ Stadium, Suva, Fiji	New Caledonia	3–0	3–1	2022 OFC Women's Nations Cup
3.	24 July 2022	ANZ Stadium, Suva, Fiji	Cook Islands	1–0	2–0	2022 OFC Women's Nations Cup
4.	24 November 2023	Lawson Tama Stadium, Honiara, Solomon Islands	Solomon Islands	1–1	4–1	2023 Pacific Games
5.	7 February 2024	FFS Football Stadium, Apia, Samoa	American Samoa	1–0	10–0	2024 OFC Women's Olympic Qualifying Tournament
6.	7 February 2024	FFS Football Stadium, Apia, Samoa	American Samoa	2–0	10–0	2024 OFC Women's Olympic Qualifying Tournament
7.	7 February 2024	FFS Football Stadium, Apia, Samoa	American Samoa	3–0	10–0	2024 OFC Women's Olympic Qualifying Tournament
8.	10 February 2024	FFS Football Stadium, Apia, Samoa	Papua New Guinea	1–0	4–3	2024 OFC Women's Olympic Qualifying Tournament
9.	21 February 2026	Govind Park, Ba, Fiji	American Samoa	2–1	2–1	Friendly
10.	27 February 2026	Govind Park, Ba, Fiji	New Caledonia	2–0	5–0	2027 FIFA Women's World Cup qualification
11.	27 February 2026	Govind Park, Ba, Fiji	New Caledonia	4–0	5–0	2027 FIFA Women's World Cup qualification
12.	5 March 2026	Govind Park, Ba, Fiji	Vanuatu	1–0	1–0	2027 FIFA Women's World Cup qualification
