= 2022 OFC Women's Nations Cup =

12th edition of the OFC Women's Nations Cup

Tournament details
- Host country: Fiji
- City: Suva
- Dates: 13–30 July
- Teams: 9 (from 1 confederation)
- Venue: 1 (in 1 host city)

Final positions
- Champions: Papua New Guinea (1st title)
- Runners-up: Fiji
- Third place: Solomon Islands
- Fourth place: Samoa

Tournament statistics
- Matches played: 17
- Goals scored: 49 (2.88 per match)
- Attendance: 10,260 (604 per match)
- Top scorer(s): (Papua New Guinea) Meagen Gunemba (Papua New Guinea) Ramona Padio (Samoa) Jayda Stewart (5 goals each)
- Best player: (Fiji) Cema Nasau
- Best goalkeeper: (French Polynesia) Camille Andre
- Fair play award: Samoa

The 2022 OFC Women's Nations Cup was the 12th edition of the OFC Women's Nations Cup (also known as the OFC Women's Championship), the quadrennial international football championship organised by the Oceania Football Confederation (OFC) for the women's national teams of the Oceanian region. It was originally scheduled from July to August 2022, but was moved to January and February to accommodate changes to the FIFA Women's International Match Calendar. The OFC announced on 4 March 2021 that it was pushed back due to the COVID-19 pandemic, and on 29 April 2022 announced that Fiji would host the tournament from 13 to 30 July.

The tournament served as Oceania's qualifiers to the 2023 FIFA Women's World Cup in Australia and New Zealand. With New Zealand having already qualified automatically for the World Cup as a co-host, they did not participate in the tournament. The winner advanced to the inter-confederation play-offs.

New Zealand were the reigning champions, but they did not participate in the tournament as they were the host of the Women's World Cup and thus did not defend their title. Papua New Guinea won their first OFC Women's Nations Cup title.

== Format ==
The format of the tournament involved a first round with nine teams playing three groups of three, with the top two in each group plus the two best third-place teams advancing to the quarter-finals. Fiji was picked to be the host in April 2022.

=== Tiebreakers ===
The ranking of teams is determined as follows:

1. Points obtained in all qualifying matches;
2. Goal difference in all qualifying matches;
3. Number of goals scored in all qualifying matches;
4. Points obtained in the matches played between the teams in question;
5. Goal difference in the matches played between the teams in question;
6. Number of goals scored in the matches played between the teams in question;
7. Fair play points in all qualifying matches (only one deduction can be applied to a player in a single match):
  - Yellow card: –1 points;
  - Indirect red card (second yellow card): –3 points;
  - Direct red card: –4 points;
  - Yellow card and direct red card: –5 points;
8. Coin toss or drawing of lots.

== Teams ==
New Zealand did not participate with their World Cup spot already assured. American Samoa were unable to participate due to ongoing issues from the pandemic. All other countries in the OFC participated.

Team	Appearance	Previous best performance	FIFA ranking at start of event
Cook Islands	5th	Third place (2010, 2014)	102
Fiji (H)	5th	Runners-up (2018)	69
New Caledonia	3rd	Third place (1983)	100
Papua New Guinea	10th	Runners-up (2007, 2010, 2014)	49
Samoa	4th	Fourth place (2003)	109
Solomon Islands	3rd	Fourth place (2007, 2010)	120
Tahiti	3rd	Group stage (2010, 2018)	104
Tonga	5th	Third place (2007)	92
Vanuatu	2nd	Group stage (2010)	121

== Venue ==
All matches were played at the ANZ Stadium in Suva, on the island of Viti Levu.

Suva is located in Fiji	Suva
Suva is located in Fiji	ANZ Stadium
Suva is located in Fiji	Capacity: 4,300

== Draw ==
The draw for the group stage was held on 10 May with teams seeded into pots based upon the 25 March FIFA rankings.

Pot 1	Pot 2	Pot 3
Papua New Guinea (49); Fiji (67); Tonga (92)	New Caledonia (99); Cook Islands (104); Tahiti (105)	Samoa (111); Solomon Islands (119); Vanuatu (121)

== Match officials ==
On 12 July 2022, the OFC announced the list of match officials for the tournament.

During the tournament, Veer Singh and Neeshil Varman (Fiji) were assigned as referees.

Referees

- (Fiji) Torika Delai
- (Fiji) Veer Singh
- (Fiji) Neeshil Varman
- (New Zealand) Anna-Marie Keighley
- (New Zealand) Beth Rattray
- (Solomon Islands) Shama Maemae
- (Vanuatu) Delvin Joel

Assistant referees

- (Fiji) Adi Gadolo
- (Fiji) Jemima Rao
- (New Zealand) Allys Clipsham
- (New Zealand) Sarah Jones
- (New Zealand) Heloise Simons
- (Papua New Guinea) Stephanie Minan
- (Samoa) Maria Salamasina
- (Solomon Islands) Natalia Lumukana
- (French Polynesia) Vaihina Teura
- (Tonga) Lata Kaumatule
- (Tonga) Feliuaki Kolotau

== Group stage ==
All match times are local (UTC+12).

=== Group A ===
Pos	Team	Pld	W	D	L	GF	GA	GD	Pts	Qualification
1	Samoa	2	2	0	0	3	0	+3	6	Knockout stage
2	Cook Islands	2	0	1	1	1	2	−1	1	Knockout stage
3	Tonga	2	0	1	1	1	3	−2	1	Knockout stage

Source: OFC
Rules for classification: Group stage tiebreakers
13 July 2022
19:00

Samoa	2–0	Tonga
Fischer 28'; Stewart 70'	Report (FIFA); Report (OFC)

ANZ Stadium, Suva
Attendance: 100
Referee: Shama Maemae (Solomon Islands)

16 July 2022
19:00

Tonga	1–1	Cook Islands
Swift 73'	Report (FIFA); Report (OFC)	Davison 49'

ANZ Stadium, Suva
Attendance: 100
Referee: Delvin Joel (Vanuatu)

19 July 2022
19:00

Cook Islands	0–1	Samoa
	Report (FIFA); Report (OFC)	Stewart 14'

ANZ Stadium, Suva
Attendance: 100
Referee: Shama Maemae (Solomon Islands)

=== Group B ===
Pos	Team	Pld	W	D	L	GF	GA	GD	Pts	Qualification
1	Papua New Guinea	2	2	0	0	5	2	+3	6	Knockout stage
2	Tahiti	2	0	1	1	1	2	−1	1	Knockout stage
3	Vanuatu	2	0	1	1	1	3	−2	1	

Source: OFC
Rules for classification: Group stage tiebreakers
14 July 2022
16:00

Vanuatu	1–3	Papua New Guinea
Keletia 71'	Report (FIFA); Report (OFC)	Kaipu 34'; Padio 76'; Yanding 79'

ANZ Stadium, Suva
Attendance: 865
Referee: Torika Delai (Fiji)

17 July 2022
16:00

Papua New Guinea	2–1	Tahiti
Padio 28' (pen.); Gunemba 83'	Report (FIFA); Report (OFC)	Tamarii 90' (pen.)

ANZ Stadium, Suva
Attendance: 150
Referee: Shama Maemae (Solomon Islands)

20 July 2022
16:00

Tahiti	0–0	Vanuatu
	Report (FIFA); Report (OFC)

ANZ Stadium, Suva
Attendance: 250
Referee: Torika Delai (Fiji)

=== Group C ===
Pos	Team	Pld	W	D	L	GF	GA	GD	Pts	Qualification
1	Fiji (H)	2	1	1	0	4	2	+2	4	Knockout stage
2	Solomon Islands	2	0	2	0	3	3	0	2	Knockout stage
3	New Caledonia	2	0	1	1	3	5	−2	1	Knockout stage

Source: OFC
Rules for classification: Group stage tiebreakers
(H) Hosts
14 July 2022
19:00

Solomon Islands	1–1	Fiji
Pegi 37' (pen.)	Report (FIFA); Report (OFC)	Kumar 22'

ANZ Stadium, Suva
Attendance: 865
Referee: Anna-Marie Keighley (New Zealand)

17 July 2022
19:00

Fiji	3–1	New Caledonia
Hussein 4'; Diyalowai 45', 56'	Report (FIFA); Report (OFC)	Pahoa 90+1' (pen.)

ANZ Stadium, Suva
Attendance: 500
Referee: Anna-Marie Keighley (New Zealand)

20 July 2022
19:00

New Caledonia	2–2	Solomon Islands
Neporo 73', 79'	Report (FIFA); Report (OFC)	Gogoni 16'; Maefiti 86'

ANZ Stadium, Suva
Attendance: 500
Referee: Anna-Marie Keighley (New Zealand)

=== Ranking of third-placed teams ===
Pos	Grp	Team	Pld	W	D	L	GF	GA	GD	Pts	Qualification
1	C	New Caledonia	2	0	1	1	3	5	−2	1	Knockout stage
2	A	Tonga	2	0	1	1	1	3	−2	1 (Note: Fair play points: Tonga 0, Vanuatu –3)	Knockout stage
3	B	Vanuatu	2	0	1	1	1	3	−2	1	

Source: OFC
Rules for classification: Group stage tiebreakers

== Knockout stage ==
=== Bracket ===
Quarter-finals
23 July 2022 – Suva
Samoa	4
New Caledonia	2
23 July 2022 – Suva
Papua New Guinea (p)	3 (3)
Tonga	3 (2)
24 July 2022 – Suva
Fiji	2
Cook Islands	0
24 July 2022 – Suva
Tahiti	0
Solomon Islands	1

Semi-finals
27 July 2022 – Suva
Samoa	0
Papua New Guinea	3
27 July 2022 – Suva
Fiji	3
Solomon Islands	1

Final
30 July 2022 – Suva
Papua New Guinea	2
Fiji	1
Third place
30 July 2022 – Suva
Samoa	1 (5)
Solomon Islands (p)	1 (6)

=== Quarter-finals ===
23 July 2022
16:00

Samoa	4–2	New Caledonia
Fischer 35'; Stewart 51', 83', 90+5'	Report (FIFA); Report (OFC)	Uregei 45', 90'

ANZ Stadium, Suva
Attendance: 120
Referee: Torika Delai (Fiji)

23 July 2022
19:30

Papua New Guinea	3–3 (a.e.t.)	Tonga
Padio 63', 99'; Gunemba 70'	Report (FIFA); Report (OFC)	D. Vaka 29'; Loto'aniu 44', 109'
Penalties
Bauelua (penalty scored); Padio (penalty scored); Gunemba (penalty scored); Morris (penalty missed)	3–2	(penalty scored) Loto'aniu; (penalty missed) D. Vaka; (penalty missed) La'akulu; (penalty scored) L. Vaka; (penalty missed) Siale

ANZ Stadium, Suva
Attendance: 200
Referee: Veer Singh (Fiji)

24 July 2022
16:00

Fiji	2–0	Cook Islands
Diyalowai 22'; Tamanitoakula 74'	Report (FIFA); Report (OFC)

ANZ Stadium, Suva
Attendance: 400
Referee: Shama Maemae (Solomon Islands)

24 July 2022
19:30

Tahiti	0–1	Solomon Islands
	Report (FIFA); Report (OFC)	Maefiti 38'

ANZ Stadium, Suva
Attendance: 600
Referee: Neeshil Varman (Fiji)

=== Semi-finals ===
27 July 2022
16:00

Samoa	0–3	Papua New Guinea
	Report (FIFA); Report (OFC)	Yanding 44'; Gunemba 48', 78'

ANZ Stadium, Suva
Attendance: 1,250
Referee: Torika Delai (Fiji)

27 July 2022
19:30

Fiji	3–1	Solomon Islands
Nasau 14', 28'; Tamanitoakula 83'	Report (FIFA); Report (OFC)	Pegi 11' (pen.)

ANZ Stadium, Suva
Attendance: 1,250
Referee: Delvin Joel (Vanuatu)

=== Third place match ===
30 July 2022
16:00

Samoa	1–1	Solomon Islands
Fischer 16'	Report (FIFA); Report (OFC)	David 40'
Penalties
Soifua (penalty scored); Lilii Moa (penalty scored); Uluvili (penalty scored); Tuatagaloa (penalty scored); Fischer (penalty scored); Stevens (penalty missed)	5–6	(penalty scored) Pegi; (penalty scored) Saepio; (penalty scored) Solo; (penalty scored) Nari; (penalty scored) Maefiti; (penalty scored) Joe

ANZ Stadium, Suva
Attendance: 1,419
Referee: Torika Delai (Fiji)

=== Final ===
The winner will advance to the inter-confederation playoffs.

30 July 2022
19:00

Papua New Guinea	2–1	Fiji
Gunemba 17'; Padio 28'	Report (FIFA); Report (OFC)	Nasau 42'

HFC Bank Stadium, Suva
Attendance: 1,591
Referee: Shama Maemae (Solomon Islands)

== Goalscorers ==
There were 49 goals scored in 17 matches, for an average of 2.88 goals per match.

5 goals

- (Papua New Guinea) Meagen Gunemba
- (Papua New Guinea) Ramona Padio
- (Samoa) Jayda Stewart

3 goals

- (Fiji) Sofi Diyalowai
- (Fiji) Cema Nasau
- (Samoa) Monique Fischer

2 goals

- (Fiji) Luisa Tamanitoakula
- (New Caledonia) Jennifer Neporo
- (New Caledonia) Sarah Uregei
- (Papua New Guinea) Charlie Yanding
- (Solomon Islands) Mary Maefiti
- (Solomon Islands) Ileen Pegi
- (Tonga) Jazmine Loto'aniu

1 goal

- (Cook Islands) Lyric Davison
- (Fiji) Aliza Hussein
- (Fiji) Vanisha Kumar
- (New Caledonia) Jackie Pahoa
- (Papua New Guinea) Marie Kaipu
- (Solomon Islands) Jemina David
- (Solomon Islands) Almah Gogoni
- (French Polynesia) Tahia Tamarii
- (Tonga) Kiana Swift
- (Tonga) Daviana Vaka
- (Vanuatu) Vanessa Keletia

== Awards ==
2022 OFC Women's Nations Cup winners

Papua New Guinea
First title

Award	Winner
Golden Ball	(Fiji) Cema Nasau
Golden Boot	(Papua New Guinea) Meagen Gunemba (Papua New Guinea) Ramona Padio (Samoa) Jayda Stewart
Golden Glove	(French Polynesia) Camille Andre
Fair Play	Samoa

== Qualified teams for FIFA Women's World Cup ==
The sole OFC direct berth for the 2023 FIFA Women's World Cup was given to New Zealand, who qualified automatically as co-hosts.

Team	Qualified on	Previous appearances in FIFA Women's World Cup^{1}
New Zealand	25 June 2020	5 (1991, 2007, 2011, 2015, 2019)
