= Cema Nasau =

Fijian footballer

Personal information
- Date of birth: 15 November 1999 (age 26)
- Position: Midfielder

Team information
- Current team: Ba

Senior career*
Years	Team	Apps	(Gls)
2020-2025	Ba	29	(44)
2022	Labasa	15	(21)
2025	Eastern Suburbs	13	(8)
2026	Ba	1	(1)

International career
2017	Fiji U20	5	(4)
2018–	Fiji	30	(35)
- * Club domestic league appearances and goals

Cema Nasau (born 15 November 1999) is a Fijian footballer who plays as a midfielder for Ba FC and the Fiji women's national team.

Nasau is from Koroqaqa in Ba Province and plays for Ba F.C. She started playing football in 2015. In 2016 she was part of the Fiji women's national under-17 football team for the 2017 OFC U-16 Women's Championship. In 2017 she was part of the Fiji women's national under-20 football team for the 2017 OFC U-19 Women's Championship. In 2018 she was selected for the Fiji women's national football team for the 2018 OFC Women's Nations Cup. In 2019 she was part of the team which won bronze at the 2019 Pacific Games in Apia.

In 2022 she won the golden boot and golden ball awards in the Women's Inter-District Championship. During the 2022 OFC Women's Nations Cup she won two player of the match awards, as well as best player of the tournament.

In 2023 she will move to the Babasiga Lionesses.

== International goals ==
No.	Date	Venue	Opponent	Score	Result	Competition
1.	4 December 2017	Port Vila, Vanuatu	Tonga	2–0	5–0	2017 Pacific Mini Games
2.	4 December 2017	Port Vila, Vanuatu	Tonga	4–0	5–0	2017 Pacific Mini Games
3.	11 December 2017	Port Vila, Vanuatu	Solomon Islands	1–0	2–0	2017 Pacific Mini Games
4.	14 December 2017	Port Vila, Vanuatu	Vanuatu	1–1	1–2	2017 Pacific Mini Games
5.	19 November 2018	Nouméa, New Caledonia	Cook Islands	1–0	3–0	2018 OFC Women's Nations Cup
6.	22 November 2018	Nouméa, New Caledonia	Tonga	3–0	12–0	2018 OFC Women's Nations Cup
7.	22 November 2018	Nouméa, New Caledonia	Tonga	9–0	12–0	2018 OFC Women's Nations Cup
8.	22 November 2018	Nouméa, New Caledonia	Tonga	10–0	12–0	2018 OFC Women's Nations Cup
9.	28 November 2018	Maré, New Caledonia	Papua New Guinea	4–1	5–1	2018 OFC Women's Nations Cup
10.	8 July 2019	Apia, Samoa	American Samoa	2–0	11–0	2019 Pacific Games
11.	8 July 2019	Apia, Samoa	American Samoa	3–0	11–0	2019 Pacific Games
12.	15 July 2019	Apia, Samoa	New Caledonia	2–0	4–0	2019 Pacific Games
13.	18 July 2019	Apia, Samoa	Tonga	1–0	3–1	2019 Pacific Games
14.	20 July 2019	Apia, Samoa	Cook Islands	1–0	3–1	2019 Pacific Games
15.	20 July 2019	Apia, Samoa	Cook Islands	2–0	3–1	2019 Pacific Games
16.	7 April 2022	Sydney, Australia	Philippines	1–6	2–7	Friendly
17.	5 July 2022	Lautoka, Fiji	Tonga	4–0	5–0	Friendly
18.	27 July 2022	Suva, Fiji	Solomon Islands	1–1	3–1	2022 OFC Women's Nations Cup
19.	27 July 2022	Suva, Fiji	Solomon Islands	2–1	3–1	2022 OFC Women's Nations Cup
20.	30 July 2022	Suva, Fiji	Papua New Guinea	1–2	1–2	2022 OFC Women's Nations Cup
21.	8 November 2022	Canberra, Australia	Papua New Guinea	1–0	2–0	2022 Pacific Women's Four Nations
22.	21 November 2023	Honiara, Solomon Islands	Vanuatu	1–0	3–2	2023 Pacific Games
23.	27 November 2023	Honiara, Solomon Islands	New Caledonia	2–0	3–0	2023 Pacific Games
24.	7 February 2024	Apia, Samoa	American Samoa	5–0	10–0	2024 OFC Women's Olympic Qualifying Tournament
25.	7 February 2024	Apia, Samoa	American Samoa	6–0	10–0	2024 OFC Women's Olympic Qualifying Tournament
26.	7 February 2024	Apia, Samoa	American Samoa	9–0	10–0	2024 OFC Women's Olympic Qualifying Tournament
27.	16 February 2024	Apia, Samoa	New Zealand	1–7	1–7	2024 OFC Women's Olympic Qualifying Tournament
28.	30 May 2025	Port Moresby, Papua New Guinea	Papua New Guinea	2–2	2–2	Friendly
29.	1 July 2025	Port Moresby, Papua New Guinea	Papua New Guinea	1–1	3–1	Friendly
30.	1 July 2025	Port Moresby, Papua New Guinea	Papua New Guinea	2–1	3–1	Friendly
31.	1 July 2025	Port Moresby, Papua New Guinea	Papua New Guinea	3–1	3–1	Friendly
32.	5 July 2025	Suva, Fiji	Solomon Islands	2–2	3–2	2025 OFC Women's Nations Cup
33.	5 July 2025	Suva, Fiji	Solomon Islands	3–2	3–2	2025 OFC Women's Nations Cup
34.	8 July 2025	Suva, Fiji	Tonga	1–0	3–0	2025 OFC Women's Nations Cup
35.	27 February 2026	Ba, Fiji	New Caledonia	3–0	5–0	2027 FIFA Women's World Cup qualification
