= Kiani Wong =

Tahitian footballer (born 2000)

Personal information
- Full name: Kiani Heipuarii Mareva Wong
- Date of birth: 21 November 2000 (age 25)
- Place of birth: Papeete, Tahiti
- Position: Midfielder

Team information
- Current team: 1. FC Saarbrücken
- Number: 16

Youth career
- A.S. Tefana
- Clairefontaine
- FC Vendenheim

Senior career*
Years	Team	Apps	(Gls)
2018–2019	FC Vendenheim	5	(0)
2019	Cardiff City		
2019–2020	Yeovil United		
2020–2021	Saarbrücken	1	(0)
2021–2024	Lens	5	(0)
2024–	Girondins de Bordeaux	8	(0)

International career
	Tahiti	4	(1)
- * Club domestic league appearances and goals as of 18 October 2020

Kiani Heipuarii Mareva Wong (born 21 November 2000) is a Tahitian professional footballer who plays as a midfielder for Division 3 Féminine club Girondins de Bordeaux and the Tahiti women's national team.

== Early life and training ==
Wong has played football since the age of 4. Her father is a football coach. In Tahiti, she played for A.S. Tefana for ten years, and was a finalist for the Tahiti Nui cup as an U15 player.

In May 2016 she attended the INF Clairefontaine in France. While overseas she studied at the Lycée Jean Monnet and University of Strasbourg.

== Club career ==
Wong was subsequently recruited by FC Vendenheim in Alsace, France. She later played with Cardiff City in Wales, and signed with Yeovil Town Women in England at the end of 2019. In the fall of 2020, Wong transferred to 1. FC Saarbrücken in Germany, and was expected to start playing immediately due to team injuries.

== International career ==
Kiani Wong was selected for the Tahiti national team for the 2018 OFC Women's Nations Cup and for the 2019 Pacific Games in Apia, Samoa. In 2021, she was appointed as a football ambassador by the Oceania Football Confederation as part of its women's football strategy.

In February 2022, she was selected for Tahiti's friendly matches against Luxembourg and Andorra. In July, she was named to the squad for the 2022 OFC Women's Nations Cup.

Wong featured with women's footballers Gwendoline Fournier and Camille Andre on a stamp to celebrate international women's day 2023.
