= Ileen Pegi =

Solomon Islands footballer (born 1992)

Personal information
- Date of birth: 18 July 1992 (age 34)
- Place of birth: Solomon Islands
- Position: Striker

Team information
- Current team: Henderson Eels

Senior career*
Years	Team	Apps	(Gls)
2020-2025	Koloale	81	(130)
2025	Henderson Eels	7	(6)
2025	Labasa	10	(18)
2026	Henderson Eels	17	(42)

International career
2022	Solomon Islands	22	(13)
Medal record
Women's football
Representing Solomon Islands
OFC Women's Nations Cup
Winner	2025 Fiji
- * Club domestic league appearances and goals

Ileen Pegi (born July 18, 1992) is a Solomon Islands footballer who plays as a striker for Telekom S-League club Henderson Eels and the Solomon Islands women's national football team.

== Club career ==
Pegi played for Solomon Islands side Koloale, where she captained the club. She was awarded 2023 Solomon Islands Female Player of the Season.

== International career ==
Pegi helped the Solomon Islands women's national football team achieve third place at the 2022 OFC Women's Nations Cup. She is the captain of the Solomon Islands women's national football team. She is the all-time record appearance maker for the Solomon Islands women's national football team.

== International goals ==
No.	Date	Venue	Opponent	Score	Result	Competition
1.	14 July 2022	ANZ Stadium, Suva, Fiji	Fiji	1–0	1–1	2022 OFC Women's Nations Cup
2.	27 July 2022	ANZ Stadium, Suva, Fiji	Fiji	1–0	1–3	2022 OFC Women's Nations Cup
3.	11 November 2022	Australian Institute of Sport, Canberra, Australia	Papua New Guinea	3–0	3–0	2022 Pacific Women's Four Nations Tournament
4.	1 December 2023	SIFF Academy Fields, Honiara, Solomon Islands	Vanuatu	1–1	1–2	2023 Pacific Games
5.	13 February 2024	FFS Football Stadium, Apia, Samoa	Fiji	1–0	3–1	2024 OFC Women's Olympic Qualifying Tournament
6.	13 February 2024	FFS Football Stadium, Apia, Samoa	Fiji	2–0	3–1	2024 OFC Women's Olympic Qualifying Tournament
7.	13 February 2024	FFS Football Stadium, Apia, Samoa	Fiji	3–1	3–1	2024 OFC Women's Olympic Qualifying Tournament
8.	16 February 2024	FFS Football Stadium, Apia, Samoa	Samoa	2–0	2–0	2024 OFC Women's Olympic Qualifying Tournament
9.	8 July 2025	HFC Bank Stadium, Suva, Fiji	Vanuatu	1–0	2–1	2025 OFC Women's Nations Cup
10.	11 July 2025	HFC Bank Stadium, Suva, Fiji	Tonga	2–0	5–0	2025 OFC Women's Nations Cup
11.	11 July 2025	HFC Bank Stadium, Suva, Fiji	Tonga	3–0	5–0	2025 OFC Women's Nations Cup
12.	16 July 2025	HFC Bank Stadium, Suva, Fiji	Samoa	1–1	2–1	2025 OFC Women's Nations Cup
13.	5 March 2026	National Stadium, Honiara, Solomon Islands	Samoa	1–1	1–2	2027 FIFA Women's World Cup qualification
