= Anna-Marie Keighley =

New Zealand football referee (born 1982)

- Born: 30 June 1982 (age 44); Waitara, New Zealand
- Other occupation: School teacher

Domestic
Years	League	Role
2008–	NZ Football	Referee

International
Years	League	Role
2010–	FIFA listed	Referee

Anna-Marie Keighley (born 30 June 1982) is an association football referee from Taranaki, New Zealand. She has officiated matches at the international level since 2010, including the FIFA Women's World Cup and the Summer Olympics. Outside of refereeing, she is a school teacher at Rototuna Senior High School.

== Career ==
Keighley's first international tournament was the 2010 Championship. She was later called up to several OFC tournaments, including the 2012 Olympic Qualifiers, 2014 U-20 Championship, 2016 U-17 Championship, 2022 Nations Cup as well as the men's 2016 OFC Champions League.

Keighley has been the OFC representative at several intercontinental women's tournaments, including the 2014 FIFA U-17 Women's World Cup, the 2018 U-20 World Cup, and the 2022 U-20 World Cup.

She was the first referee to officiate in five matches at a single edition of the FIFA Women's World Cup, doing so in the 2015 World Cup. During the semi-final between Japan and England, Keighley awarded a penalty for Japan for a foul that occurred outside the penalty area, for which she received criticism. She has since refereed at the 2019 World Cup and was named to the shortlist for the 2023 World Cup.

She was part of the roster for the Dallas Cup in the United States and officiates matches in the domestic New Zealand Football Championship (now replaced by the New Zealand National League). In 2017, she was one of several female referees to be named to the roster at the FIFA men's U-17 World Cup in a supporting role.

== Personal life ==
Keighley married a fellow referee, Campbell-Kirk Kawana-Waugh, in July 2017. The couple officiated back-to-back matches in the Women's Knockout Cup and Chatham Cup, respectively, in September 2017. She was originally based in Taranaki but moved to Auckland to pursue better refereeing opportunities. Keighley later moved to Hamilton, where she teaches at Rototuna Senior High School.
