= New Caledonia women's national football team =

Women's national association football team representing New Caledonia

New Caledonia
- Association: New Caledonian Football Federation
- Confederation: OFC (Oceania)
- Head coach: Kamali Fitialeata
- Most caps: Glenda Jaine (14)
- FIFA code: NCL
First colours	Second colours

FIFA ranking
- Current: 100 ▲1 (11 December 2025)
- Highest: 84 (December 2016)
- Lowest: 137 (October – December 2007)

First international
- New Caledonia 2–0 Fiji (Nouméa, New Caledonia; 28 November 1983)

Biggest win
- New Caledonia 9–0 American Samoa (Apia, Samoa; 12 July 2019)

Biggest defeat
- New Caledonia 0–8 New Zealand (Lifou, New Caledonia; 28 November 2018)

OFC Women's Nations Cup
- Appearances: 3 (first in 1983)
- Best result: Third place (1983)

The New Caledonia women's national football team (French: équipe de Nouvelle-Calédonie féminine de football) represents New Caledonia in international women's football. The team is controlled by the Fédération Calédonienne de Football.

== Recent History ==
In 2026, New Caledonia will participate in the second round of the OFC qualification for the 2027 FIFA Women's World Cup. In the group stage, they will face Fiji, Vanuatu, and Papua New Guinea.

== Results and fixtures ==
The following is a list of match results in the last 12 months, as well as any future matches that have been scheduled.

Legend

Win Draw Lose Void or postponed Fixture

=== 2026 ===
27 February 2026 2027 FIFA Women's World Cup OFC Qualification	Fiji	5–0	New Caledonia	Ba, Fiji
16:00 UTC+12	Davis 11'; Diyalowai 28', 45+4'; Nasau 36'; Alfred 75'	Report (OFC); Report (FIFA)		Stadium: Govind Park; Attendance: 150; Referee: Sarah Jones (New Zealand)

2 March 2026 2027 FIFA Women's World Cup OFC Qualification	New Caledonia	2–1	Vanuatu	Ba, Fiji
12:00 UTC+12	Dralu 14'; Hmae 34'	Report (OFC); Report (FIFA)	Simon 83'	Stadium: Govind Park; Attendance: 50; Referee: Beth Rattray (New Zealand)

5 March 2026 2027 FIFA Women's World Cup OFC Qualification	New Caledonia	0–4	Papua New Guinea	Ba, Fiji
12:00 UTC+12		Report (OFC); Report (FIFA)	A. Gunemba 73'; Kalapai 90'; M. Gunemba 90+4'; Maneo 90+6'	Stadium: Govind Park; Attendance: 50; Referee: Anna-Marie Keighley (New Zealand)

12 April 2026 FIFA Series	Thailand	4–0	New Caledonia	Ratchaburi, Thailand
20:30 UTC+7	Ngosuwan 4'; Promthongmee 28'; Jinantuya 73'; Rukpinij 90+1'	Report (FIFA)		Stadium: Ratchaburi Stadium; Referee: Kim Yu-jeong (South Korea)

15 April 2026 FIFA Series	New Caledonia	2–4	Indonesia	Ratchaburi, Thailand
16:00 UTC+7	Honakoko 61'; Hmae 80'	Report (FIFA)	Nahon 19'; Imut 28', 53'; Scheunemann 59'	Stadium: Ratchaburi Stadium; Referee: Sunita Thongthawin (Thailand)

== Coaching staff ==
As of 27 February 2026

Position	
Head coach	(New Caledonia) Christelle Wahnawe

== Players ==
=== Current squad ===
- The following players were named to the squad for the 2027 FIFA Women's World Cup qualification (OFC) between 27 February and 5 March 2026.

No.	Pos.	Player	Date of birth (age)	Club
	GK	Elisabeth Aben		(New Caledonian Football Federation) AS Wetr
	GK	Prescillia Maillot		(French Football Federation) SC Notre-Dame des Champs
	GK	Muneiko Waheo		(New Caledonian Football Federation) SC Ne Drehu
	DF	Léana Hmae		(New Caledonian Football Federation) AS Wetr
	DF	Jennifer Sinyeue		(New Caledonian Football Federation) Drehu AC
	DF	Hélène Waengene		(New Caledonian Football Federation) SC Ne Drehu
	DF	Christine Alikie		(French Football Federation) CPB Bréquigny Rennes
	DF	Vaseline Taine		(New Caledonian Football Federation) AS Wetr
	DF	Emmanuelle Buama		(New Caledonian Football Federation) ASAF
	DF	Henriette Nena		(French Football Federation) Foyer Espérance de Trélazé
	MF	Matha Bako		(New Caledonian Football Federation) AS Wetr
	MF	Kelia Golitin		(New Caledonian Football Federation) Païta
	MF	Kheimera Gondou		(New Caledonian Football Federation) Païta
	MF	Suzanne Ihmeling		(New Caledonian Football Federation) AS Wetr
	MF	Jackie Pahoa		(French Football Federation) Montaigu Vendée Futsal
	MF	Marie-Laure Palene		(French Football Federation) Le Mans FC
	MF	Jaëlle Sinyeue		(New Caledonian Football Federation) Drehu AC
	MF	Shirley Wenessia		(New Caledonian Football Federation) AS Wetr
	FW	Julia Honakoko		(New Caledonian Football Federation) AS Wetr
	FW	Adrane Pawawi		(New Caledonian Football Federation) SC Ne Drehu
	FW	Jocelyne Kourevi		(New Caledonian Football Federation) Drehu AC
	FW	Caroline Naaoutchoue		(French Football Federation) Jacou Clapiers FA
	FW	Kané Dralu		(New Caledonian Football Federation) Drehu AC

=== Recent call-ups ===
The following players have been named to the New Caledonia squad in the last 12 months.

Pos.	Player	Date of birth (age)	Caps	Goals	Club	Latest call-up

=== Previous squads ===
OFC Women's Nations Cup

- 2018 OFC Women's Nations Cup – New Caledonia

== Competitive record ==
=== FIFA Women's World Cup ===
FIFA Women's World Cup
Year	Result	GP	W	D*	L	GF	GA	GD
(China) 1991	did not enter							
(Sweden) 1995	did not enter							
(United States) 1999	did not enter							
(United States) 2003	did not enter							
(China) 2007	did not enter							
(Germany) 2011	did not enter							
(Canada) 2015	did not enter							
(France) 2019	did not qualify							
(Australia) (New Zealand) 2023	did not qualify							
(Brazil) 2027	did not qualify							
(Costa Rica) (Jamaica) (Mexico) (United States) 2031	to be determined							
(United Kingdom) 2035	to be determined							
Total	0/12	–	–	–	–	–	–	–

=== OFC Women's Nations Cup ===
OFC Women's Nations Cup
Year	Result	Position	GP	W	D*	L	GF	GA
(New Caledonia) 1983	Third place	3rd	3	1	0	2	2	11
(New Zealand) 1986	Did not enter							
(Australia) 1989	Did not enter							
(Australia) 1991	Did not enter							
(Papua New Guinea) 1994	Did not enter							
(New Zealand) 1998	Did not enter							
(Australia) 2003	Did not enter							
(Papua New Guinea) 2007	Did not enter							
(New Zealand) 2010	Did not enter							
(Papua New Guinea) 2014	Did not enter							
(New Caledonia) 2018	Fourth place	4th	5	2	0	3	9	23
(Fiji) 2022	Quarter-finals	8th	3	0	1	2	5	9
(Fiji) 2025	Did not enter							
Total	Third place	3/12	11	3	1	7	16	43

*Draws include knockout matches decided on penalty kicks.

=== Pacific Games ===
Pacific Games
Year	Result	Pld	W	D	L	GF	GA	GD
(Fiji) 2003	did not enter							
(Samoa) 2007	Group Stage	3	0	0	3	0	6	−6
(New Caledonia) 2011	Runners-up	6	4	1	1	16	5	+11
(Papua New Guinea) 2015	Runners-up	5	3	1	1	21	5	+16
(Samoa) 2019	Group Stage	4	1	0	3	13	10	+3
(Solomon Islands) 2023	Third-place	5	3	1	1	14	8	+6
Total	Runners-up	23	11	3	9	64	34	+30

== See also ==
- Sport in New Caledonia
  - Football in New Caledonia
    - Women's football in New Caledonia
- New Caledonia men's national football team
