= Vanisha Kumar =

Fijian footballer

Personal information
- Full name: Vanisha Karishma Kumar
- Date of birth: 5 February 1995 (age 31)
- Place of birth: Sydney, Australia
- Height: 1.63 m (5 ft 4 in)
- Positions: Forward; midfielder

International career^{‡}
Years	Team	Apps	(Gls)
2011	Fiji	3	(0)
2022–	Fiji	5	(1)
- ‡ National team caps and goals as of 9 September 2011

Vanisha Karishma Kumar (born 5 February 1995) is a footballer who plays as a forward or midfielder. Born in Australia, she is a member of the Fiji women's national team. In 2015 she represented Fiji in the 2015 Pacific Games.

Kumar was born in Sydney, Australia and has been playing soccer since the age of 11. At the age of 15 she had an opportunity to try out for the Australia national team but declined so she could play for the Fiji national team.
