= Jayda Stewart =

Samoan footballer

Personal information
- Place of birth: New Zealand
- Position: Striker

Team information
- Current team: Coastal Spirit

Senior career*
Years	Team	Apps	(Gls)
- Coastal Spirit

International career
	Samoa	8	(7)
- * Club domestic league appearances and goals

Jayda Stewart is a footballer who plays as a striker for Women's South Island League club Coastal Spirit FC. Born in New Zealand, she is a Samoa international.

== Early life ==
Stewart is of Austrian, Scottish, and German descent.

== Education ==
Stewart attended Papanui High School in New Zealand.

== Career ==
Stewart represented New Zealand internationally at the 2018 FIFA U-17 Women's World Cup

== Style of play ==
Stewart mainly operates as a striker.

== Personal life ==
Stewart is a native of Christchurch, New Zealand.

== Honours ==
Individual

- Mainland Football Women's Midfielder of the Year: 2018
- Mainland Football Women's Player of the Year: 2018
