= List of football clubs in Tonga =

Recent clubs that have participated in the Tonga Major League include:

== A ==
- Ahau' FC
- Ahononou

== F ==
- Fahefa
- Fua'amotu

== H ==
- Haʻamoko United Youth
- Houmakelikao Steeler
- Houmakelikao 11 Zion

== K ==
- Kolofoʻou No.1
- Kolomotu'a

== L ==
- Lavengatonga
- Longoteme
- Lotohaʻapai United

== M ==
- Manuka FC
- Marist Prems

== N ==
- Navutoka
- Ngeleʻia FC
- Nukuhetulu

== P ==
- Popua

== V ==
- Vaolongolongo
- Veitongo
