= Kilifi Uele =

Tongan footballer & manager (born 1974)

Personal information
- Full name: Kilifi Soli Uele
- Date of birth: 14 November 1974 (age 51)
- Place of birth: Nuku'alofa, Tonga
- Position: Midfielder

Team information
- Current team: Tonga Women (manager)

Youth career
- Vaolongolongo

Senior career*
Years	Team	Apps	(Gls)
1993–2004	Vaolongolongo		
2005–2009	Ma'ufanga		
2010–2013	SC Lotoha'apai		
2013–2022	Veitongo		

International career^{‡}
1994–2017	Tonga	29	(3)

Managerial career
- 20??–2006: Tonga Women U19
- 2007–2011: Tonga Women
- 2023–: Tonga Women
- 2024–2025: Tonga
- * Club domestic league appearances and goals ‡ National team caps and goals as of 14 December 2017

Kilifi Soli Uele (born 14 November 1974) is a Tongan former footballer and manager who is the manager of the Tonga women's national football team.

According to the RSSSF, Uele is the second-oldest goalscorer in the history of international football.

== Club career ==
=== Vaolongolongo ===
In 1993, at the age of seventeen, Kilifi Uele debuted for Vaolongolongo. He left the club in December 2004.

=== Ma'ufanga ===
He then joined Ma'ufanga in January 2005 ahead of the 2005 season. He left the club in 2009 to join SC Lotoha'apai.

=== SC Lotoha'apai ===
With SC Lotoha'apai, Uele won three Tonga Major League titles in a row (2010–11, 2011–12, 2013), including scoring the winning goal during the 2–1 victory against Marist during the 2011 final on 9 April.

He made his debut in the OFC Champions League on 1 May 2012 during the 3–3 draw against Tupapa Maraerenga, and he scored his first goal in the competition during the 2–1 victory against Kiwi on 5 May 2012.

=== Veitongo ===
After six months without a club, Uele joined Veitongo in January 2014. He won six Tonga Major League titles with the club ( 2015, 2016, 2017, 2019, 2021, 2022).

After a gap between 2017 and January 2020, the 45-year-old was still playing for Veitongo at the qualifying stage of the 2020 OFC Champions League, becoming one of the few footballers to have played in four different decades (from the 1990s until the 2020s).

He then retired from football at the age of 47 on 1 June 2022.

== International career ==
Uele made his debut for Tonga on 24 November 1994 during the 1–0 loss against Tahiti at the 1994 Polynesia Cup, with his team winning second place at the tournament. By the turn of the century, he was already Tonga's captain, leading his side against an all-star Australia side in 2001, which ended in a resounding 22–0 defeat, which was forgotten just a few days later thanks to American Samoa's 31–0 loss to the same opponent. He scored his first goal for Tonga on 12 March 2002 during the 7–2 victory against American Samoa during 2002 OFC Nations Cup qualification.

Uele went on to score two more international goals, including one against New Caledonia on 9 December 2017, becoming, at the age of 43 years and 25 days, the second-oldest international goalscorer in world football, only behind Keithroy Cornelius, who had scored for Virgin Islands in 2011, at the age of 43 years and 196 days. This goal also makes him the oldest international goalscorer in the OFC.

Uele also plays beach soccer internationally, and was part of the Tongan team making its debut at the 2019 OFC Beach Soccer Nations Cup.

== Managerial career ==
Uele is the Technical Director of the Tonga Football Association, a post he has held since 2005.

Uele coached his country's women's team to win a silver medal at the 2007 OFC Women's Championship. Uele was also the head coach of his country's U-19 women's team when they took runner-up in the OFC U-19 Women's Championship in 2006, losing 6–0 to New Zealand in the finals. Before the COVID-19 pandemic in 2020, Uele helped run a new project to promote women's football in the more remote islands of Tonga. Later in 2020, Uele said his main focus was on the 2023 FIFA Women's World Cup.

He became Tonga Women manager again in 2023 and he was also the manager of Tonga between 2024 and 2025.

== Career statistics ==
=== International ===
Appearances and goals by national team and year
National team	Year	Apps	Goals
Tonga	1994	3	0
Tonga	1995	0	0
Tonga	1996	2	0
Tonga	1997	2	0
Tonga	1998	0	0
Tonga	1999	0	0
Tonga	2000	0	0
Tonga	2001	4	0
Tonga	2002	2	1
Tonga	2003	4	1
Tonga	2004	4	0
Tonga	2005	0	0
Tonga	2006	0	0
Tonga	2007	0	0
Tonga	2008	0	0
Tonga	2009	1	0
Tonga	2010	0	0
Tonga	2011	0	0
Tonga	2012	0	0
Tonga	2013	0	0
Tonga	2014	0	0
Tonga	2015	2	0
Tonga	2016	0	0
Tonga	2017	5	1
Total		29	3

Scores and results list Tonga's goal tally first, score column indicates score after each Uele goal.

List of international goals scored by Kilifi Uele
No.	Date	Venue	Cap	Opponent	Score	Result	Competition
1	12 March 2002	National Soccer Stadium, Apia, Samoa	12	American Samoa	4–1	4–2	2002 OFC Nations Cup qualification
2	5 July 2003	Vodafone Ratu Cakobau Park, Nausori, Fiji	16	Federated States of Micronesia	7–0	7–0	2003 South Pacific Games
3	9 December 2017	Port Vila Municipal Stadium, Port Vila, Vanuatu	27	New Caledonia	2–3	2–4	2017 Pacific Mini Games

== Honours ==
=== As a player ===
SC Lotoha'apai

- Tonga Major League: 2010–11, 2011–12, 2013

Veitongo

- Tonga Major League: 2015, 2016, 2017, 2019, 2021, 2022

Tonga

- Polynesia Cup: runner-up 1994

=== As a manager ===
Tonga Women

- OFC Women's Championship: 2007
