= Football at the 2003 South Pacific Games – Men's team squads =

The 2003 Pacific Games football tournament was an international football tournament held in Samoa from 30 June until 11 July 2003. The 10 national teams involved in the tournament were required to register a squad of players; only players in these squads were eligible to take part in the tournament.

Players' club teams and players' age as of 30 June 2003 – the tournament's opening day.

== Group A ==
=== Fiji ===
Coach: (Australia) Tony Buesnel

No.	Pos.	Player	Date of birth (age)	Caps	Club
1	GK	Simione Tamanisau	5 June 1982 (aged 21)		(Fiji) Rewa FC
2	DF	Lorima Dau	29 July 1983 (aged 19)		(Fiji) Rewa FC
3	DF	Marika Rodu	29 March 1982 (aged 21)		(Fiji) Rewa FC
4	FW	Waisake Sabutu	20 January 1981 (aged 22)		(Fiji) Olympian Team
5	DF	Luke Vidovi	12 January 1983 (aged 20)		(Fiji) Olympian Team
6	MF	Manoa Masi	18 August 1974 (aged 28)		(Fiji) Ba FC
7	MF	Malakai Kainihewe	28 July 1977 (aged 25)		(Fiji) Tavua FC
8	DF	Emosi Baleinuku	2 April 1975 (aged 28)		(Fiji) Nadi FC
9	MF	Thomas Vulivuli	24 May 1981 (aged 22)		(Fiji) Suva FC
10	MF	Veresa Toma	26 August 1981 (aged 21)		(Fiji) Olympian Team
11	FW	Pita Rabo	30 July 1977 (aged 25)		(Fiji) Rewa FC
12	FW	Esala Masi	9 March 1974 (aged 29)		(Australia) Newcastle Jets
13	DF	Taniela Waqa	22 June 1983 (aged 20)		(Fiji) Olympian Team
14	MF	Ronald Ram	26 May 1982 (aged 21)		(Fiji) Nasinu FC
15	MF	Salesh Kumar	28 July 1981 (aged 21)		(Fiji) Olympian Team
16	DF	Harris Bali	4 January 1978 (aged 25)		(Fiji) Nadroga FC
17	MF	Seveci Rokotakala	29 May 1978 (aged 25)		(Fiji) Lautoka FC
18	FW	Peni Pononi	Unknown		(Fiji) Olympian Team
19	DF	Laisiasa Gatarua	25 November 1981 (aged 21)		(Fiji) Olympian Team
20	GK	Afroz Nabi	11 February 1983 (aged 20)		(Fiji) Olympian Team
21	GK	Ratu Baledrokadroka	Unknown		(Fiji) Olympian Team

=== Kiribati ===
Coach: Pine Iosefa

No.	Pos.	Player	Date of birth (age)	Caps	Club
1	GK	Tarariki Tarotu	27 July 1974 (aged 28)		(Kiribati)
2	DF	Tebwaia Baikawa	16 September 1983 (aged 19)		(Kiribati)
3	MF	Tiaon Rekenibali	Unknown		(Kiribati)
4	DF	Nabaruru Batiri	1 December 1984 (aged 18)		(Kiribati)
5	DF	Takaia Tekaie	4 December 1983 (aged 19)	12	(Kiribati) Flying Tigers
6	DF	Tokabi Kaiorake	4 August 1983 (aged 19)		(Kiribati) Makin FC
7	DF	Ukenio Kobuti	7 December 1972 (aged 30)		(Kiribati)
8	MF	Ruevita Iotin	14 October 1971 (aged 31)		(Kiribati)
9	MF	Lawrence Nemeia	12 November 1977 (aged 25)		(Kiribati)
10	MF	David Collins	2 June 1972 (aged 31)		(Kiribati)
11	MF	Betaia Ioana	6 October 1975 (aged 27)		(Kiribati)
12	MF	Nabuaka Itimaroroa	30 September 1976 (aged 26)		(Kiribati)
13	FW	Naingimea Beiaruru	17 November 1980 (aged 22)		(Kiribati)
14	MF	Ioram Rabana	Unknown		(Kiribati)
15	MF	Anene Bilne	Unknown		(Kiribati)
16	DF	Takinoa Tekaei	12 August 1974 (aged 28)		(Kiribati)
17	FW	Eritara Riteti	6 August 1982 (aged 20)		(Kiribati)
18	FW	Atantaake Tooma	13 December 1977 (aged 25)		(Kiribati)
19	FW	Palamo Kulene	21 October 1977 (aged 25)		(Kiribati)
20	GK	Kiteone Kairoronga	2 August 1966 (aged 36)		(Kiribati)
21	MF	Teburae Rataro	7 December 1983 (aged 19)		(Kiribati)

=== Solomon Islands ===
Coach: (Scotland) George Cowie

No.	Pos.	Player	Date of birth (age)	Caps	Club
1	GK	Fred Hale	17 July 1979 (aged 23)		(Solomon Islands) Koloale FC
2	DF	Selson Molea	20 January 1975 (aged 28)		(Solomon Islands) Naha FC
3	DF	Mahlon Houkarawa	23 April 1976 (aged 27)		(Solomon Islands) Koloale FC
4	DF	Leslie Leo	2 August 1976 (aged 26)		(Solomon Islands) Lauga FC
5	DF	Jerry Allen	21 March 1979 (aged 24)		(Solomon Islands) Marist Fire
6	DF	Martin Ruhasia	24 November 1977 (aged 25)		(Solomon Islands) Marist Fire
7	MF	Jack Samani	7 May 1979 (aged 24)		(Solomon Islands) Marist Fire
8	MF	Stanley Waita	10 October 1979 (aged 23)		(Solomon Islands) Naha FC
9	FW	Commins Menapi	18 September 1977 (aged 25)		(Australia) Sydney United
10	FW	Batram Suri	2 November 1971 (aged 31)		(New Zealand) YoungHeart Manawatu
11	MF	Moses Toata	10 October 1975 (aged 27)		(Solomon Islands) Kossa FC
12	MF	Robert Seni	9 June 1977 (aged 26)		(Solomon Islands) Kossa FC
13	MF	Richard Ruakome	10 December 1985 (aged 17)		(Solomon Islands) Marist Fire
14	DF	William Omokirio	Unknown		(Solomon Islands) Las United
15	FW	Mark Mehau	Unknown		(Solomon Islands) Zome Mars
16	MF	Colman Maniadalo	15 January 1970 (aged 33)		(Solomon Islands) Naha FC
17	DF	Gideon Omokirio	12 October 1976 (aged 26)		(Solomon Islands) Kossa FC
18	FW	Henry Fa'arodo	5 October 1982 (aged 20)		(Australia) Melbourne Knights
19	DF	David Firisua	12 July 1981 (aged 21)		(Solomon Islands) Lauga FC
20	GK	Lucian Sikwaae	Unknown		(Solomon Islands) Marist Fire

=== Tuvalu ===
Coach: (Australia) Tim Jerks

No.	Pos.	Player	Date of birth (age)	Caps	Club
1	GK	Jay Timo	16 October 1982 (aged 20)		(Tuvalu) Manu Laeva
2	DF	Molu Tavita	Unknown		(Tuvalu) Tofaga
3	DF	Mau Penisula	15 May 1979 (aged 24)		(Tuvalu) Tofaga
4	DF	Semese Alefaio	17 March 1974 (aged 29)		(Tuvalu) Nauti
5	DF	Joshua Tui Tapasei	30 May 1979 (aged 24)		(Tuvalu) Nauti
6	DF	Samasoni Mapasaga	1 August 1982 (aged 20)		(Tuvalu) Manu Laeva
7	MF	Kivola Manoa	7 December 1972 (aged 30)		(Tuvalu) Lakena United
8	FW	Titaga Bali	Unknown		(Tuvalu) Niutao
9	MF	Mosese Huehue	Unknown		(Tuvalu) Tofaga
10	MF	Petio Semaia	23 February 1979 (aged 24)		(Tuvalu) Lakena United
11	MF	Kasipa Fagota	Unknown		(Tuvalu) Lakena United
12	MF	Moeava Mausalii	5 April 1980 (aged 23)		(Tuvalu) Manu Laeva
13	FW	Paeniu Fagota	28 August 1978 (aged 24)		(Tuvalu) Lakena United
14	MF	Peniuna Kaitu	31 January 1980 (aged 23)		(Tuvalu) Nauti
15	DF	Lalesi Vaia	Unknown		(Tuvalu) Nauti
16	FW	Iupeli Kamoni	Unknown		(Tuvalu) Niutao
17	FW	Sumeo Silu	Unknown		(Tuvalu) Tofaga
18	FW	Melei Melei	6 March 1979 (aged 24)		(Tuvalu) Lakena United
19	MF	Mahafe Nakala	Unknown		(Tuvalu) Lakena United
20	FW	Polu Tanei	Unknown		(Tuvalu) Tofaga
21	GK	Haueia Vaaia	16 March 1985 (aged 18)		(Tuvalu) Manu Laeva

=== Vanuatu ===
Coach: (Uruguay) Juan Carlos Buzzetti

No.	Pos.	Player	Date of birth (age)	Caps	Club
1	GK	David Chilia	10 June 1978 (aged 25)		(Vanuatu) Tupuji Imere
2	DF	Tony Sope	5 May 1984 (aged 19)		(Vanuatu) Tupuji Imere
3	DF	Manley Tabe	1 June 1981 (aged 22)		(Vanuatu) Shepherds United
4	DF	Lexa Bibi	16 April 1978 (aged 25)		(Vanuatu) Tupuji Imere
5	DF	Simon Lauru	30 January 1972 (aged 31)		(Vanuatu) Shepherds United
6	DF	Graham Demas	25 October 1980 (aged 22)		(Vanuatu) Tafea FC
7	DF	Fedy Vava	25 November 1982 (aged 20)		(Vanuatu) Tafea FC
8	DF	Ali Silas	23 June 1982 (aged 21)		(Vanuatu) Tafea FC
9	MF	Seimata Chilia	2 August 1978 (aged 24)		(Vanuatu) Suva FC
10	FW	Etienne Mermer	26 January 1977 (aged 26)		(Australia) Mitchelton FC
11	MF	Gérard Maki Haitong	6 July 1978 (aged 24)		(Vanuatu) Amicale FC
12	FW	Lorry Thompsen	2 November 1984 (aged 18)		(Vanuatu) Shepherds United
13	FW	Richard Iwai	15 March 1979 (aged 24)		(Australia) Mitchelton FC
14	MF	Pita Maki	12 October 1982 (aged 20)		(Vanuatu) Yatel FC
15	DF	Daniel Alick	30 July 1982 (aged 20)		(Vanuatu) Shepherds United
16	MF	Alphonse Qorig	7 July 1981 (aged 21)		(Vanuatu) Shepherds United
17	MF	Tom Tomake	23 September 1982 (aged 20)		(Vanuatu) Amicale FC
18	FW	Auretau King	23 January 1983 (aged 20)		(Vanuatu) Tupuji Imere
19	DF	Roger Joe	21 January 1986 (aged 17)		(Vanuatu) Shepherds United
20	GK	John Garae	5 April 1983 (aged 20)		(Vanuatu) Tafea FC

== Group B ==
=== F.S. Micronesia ===
Coach: (Israel) Shimon Shenhar

No.	Pos.	Player	Date of birth (age)	Caps	Club
1	GK	Jeremy Shea	29 May 1987 (aged 16)		(Federated States of Micronesia)
2	FW	Jason Kigew	Unknown		(Federated States of Micronesia)
3	FW	Jaynard White	2 December 1982 (aged 20)		(Federated States of Micronesia)
4	DF	Paul Cantero	5 March 1980 (aged 23)		(Federated States of Micronesia)
6	FW	Robert Tawerilibeg	7 November 1974 (aged 28)		(Federated States of Micronesia)
7	MF	James Luson	15 August 1983 (aged 19)		(Federated States of Micronesia)
8	MF	Sesario Sigam	17 October 1981 (aged 21)		(Federated States of Micronesia)
9	MF	Percy Rasug	22 August 1983 (aged 19)		(Federated States of Micronesia) Yap State
10	DF	Peter Igesumai	6 March 1982 (aged 21)		(Federated States of Micronesia) Yap State
11	DF	Christopher Gilmete	Unknown		(Federated States of Micronesia)
12	MF	Raphael Noway	15 February 1983 (aged 20)		(Federated States of Micronesia)
13	DF	Curtis Graham	8 September 1981 (aged 21)		(Federated States of Micronesia)
14	FW	Michael Fanafel	23 January 1983 (aged 20)		(Federated States of Micronesia)
15	DF	James Gachbar	15 February 1983 (aged 20)		(Federated States of Micronesia)
16	DF	Donald Finay	Unknown		(Federated States of Micronesia)
17	MF	Michael Ongesel	Unknown		(Federated States of Micronesia)
18	GK	Constantino Wilson	Unknown		(Federated States of Micronesia)
19	MF	Robert Paul	Unknown		(Federated States of Micronesia)
20	DF	David Kugumgag	Unknown		(Federated States of Micronesia)
21	MF	Arson Kakku	Unknown		(Federated States of Micronesia)

=== New Caledonia ===
Coach: (France) Serge Martinengo de Novack

No.	Pos.	Player	Date of birth (age)	Caps	Club
1	GK	Michel Hne	15 May 1979 (aged 24)		(New Caledonia) Gaïtcha FCN
2	DF	Jean-Marc Case	2 June 1977 (aged 26)		(New Caledonia) AS Mont-Dore
3	DF	Maurice Cawa	23 January 1974 (aged 29)		(New Caledonia) JS Baco
4	MF	Jacques Dahoté	8 December 1974 (aged 28)		(New Caledonia) AS Poum
5	FW	Ramon Djamali	12 June 1975 (aged 28)		(French Polynesia) AS Manu-Ura
6	MF	Olivier Dokunengo	4 September 1979 (aged 23)		(New Caledonia) AS Mont-Dore
7	DF	Gil Elmour	11 June 1977 (aged 26)		(New Caledonia) AS Mont-Dore
8	MF	Michel Hmaé	21 March 1978 (aged 25)		(New Caledonia) AS Pirae
9	MF	Iamel Kabeu	7 September 1982 (aged 20)		(New Caledonia) JS Baco
10	DF	Benjamin Longue	3 December 1980 (aged 22)		(France) SC Bastia
11	FW	Joseph Luenu	28 August 1977 (aged 25)		(New Caledonia) AS Pirae
12	DF	Franck Oiremoin	4 March 1975 (aged 28)		(New Caledonia) AS Mont-Dore
13	MF	Nicolas Ouka	1 December 1980 (aged 22)		(New Caledonia) AS Magenta
14	DF	Théodore Pian	5 November 1982 (aged 20)		(New Caledonia) USC Nouméa
15	FW	Paul Poatinda	7 December 1978 (aged 24)		(New Caledonia) AS Magenta
16	DF	André Sinédo	26 February 1978 (aged 25)		(New Caledonia) AS Magenta
17	MF	Jacky Wiako	18 August 1977 (aged 25)		(New Caledonia) AS Magenta
18	MF	Pierre Wajoka	19 December 1978 (aged 24)		(New Caledonia) AS Magenta
19	FW	Francis Watrone	30 March 1979 (aged 24)		(New Caledonia) AS Magenta
20	GK	Louis Samek	24 October 1974 (aged 28)		(New Caledonia) AS Mont-Dore
21	MF	Eric Elmour	Unknown		(New Caledonia) AS Mont-Dore

=== Papua New Guinea ===
Coach: Ludwig Peka

No.	Pos.	Player	Date of birth (age)	Caps	Club
1	GK	Tapas Posman	16 October 1973 (aged 29)		(Papua New Guinea) Sobou FC
2	DF	Ricky Mesak	26 June 1983 (aged 20)		(Papua New Guinea) Rapatona FC
3	MF	Michael Foster	5 September 1985 (aged 17)		(Papua New Guinea) Blue Kumuls Lae
4	DF	Ravu Habuka	18 February 1983 (aged 20)		(Papua New Guinea) Rapatona FC
5	FW	Nathan Pomat	2 April 1985 (aged 18)		(Papua New Guinea) Rapatona FC
6	MF	Alex Davani	17 August 1985 (aged 17)		(Australia) Taringa Rovers
7	MF	Desmond Sow	Unknown		(Papua New Guinea) Port Moresby Cosmos
8	MF	Abraham Enoch	21 November 1981 (aged 21)		(Papua New Guinea) Port Moresby Cosmos
9	MF	Richard Daniel	2 April 1973 (aged 30)		(Papua New Guinea) Guria FC
10	MF	Reggie Davani	5 February 1980 (aged 23)		(New Zealand) North Shore United
12	FW	Jonah Malus	Unknown		(Papua New Guinea) Rapatona FC
13	MF	Andrew Lepani	28 August 1979 (aged 23)		(Papua New Guinea) PS United
14	FW	Armstrong Peka	2 June 1983 (aged 20)		(Papua New Guinea) Blue Kumuls Lae
15	FW	Mauri Wasi	6 September 1982 (aged 20)		(Papua New Guinea) Blue Kumuls Lae
16	DF	Yanding Tomda	13 September 1977 (aged 25)		(Papua New Guinea) Unitech FC
17	MF	Paul Komboi	18 September 1976 (aged 26)		(Papua New Guinea) PS United
18	DF	Trevor Ire	9 November 1980 (aged 22)		(Papua New Guinea) University Inter
19	DF	Russell Inai	Unknown		(Papua New Guinea) Rapatona FC
20	GK	David Aua	11 February 1983 (aged 20)		(Papua New Guinea) PS United
21	MF	Chique Posman	19 April 1984 (aged 19)		(Papua New Guinea) Rapatona FC
22	DF	Kialou Pouru	11 December 1984 (aged 18)		(Papua New Guinea) Rapatona FC

=== Tahiti ===
Coach: Patrick Jacquemet

No.	Pos.	Player	Date of birth (age)	Caps	Club
1	GK	Daniel Tapeta	25 October 1974 (aged 28)		(French Polynesia) AS Manu-Ura
2	DF	Angelo Tchen	8 March 1982 (aged 21)		(French Polynesia) AS Tefana
3	DF	Vehia Maurirere	10 November 1972 (aged 30)		(French Polynesia) AS Tefana
4	DF	Steve Fatupua-Lecaill	12 January 1976 (aged 27)		(French Polynesia) AS Vénus
5	DF	Sylvain Booene	31 January 1968 (aged 35)		(French Polynesia) AS Tiaré Hinano
6	MF	Franck Papaura	13 February 1976 (aged 27)		(French Polynesia) AS Manu-Ura
7	MF	Tetahio Auraa	9 July 1973 (aged 29)		(French Polynesia) AS Manu-Ura
8	MF	Teva Zaveroni	10 October 1975 (aged 27)		(French Polynesia) AS Pirae
9	FW	Félix Tagawa	23 March 1976 (aged 27)		(Australia) Adelaide United
10	FW	Tony Sénéchal	4 March 1977 (aged 26)		(French Polynesia) AS Pirae
11	FW	Naea Bennett	8 July 1977 (aged 25)		(French Polynesia) AS Pirae
12	FW	Geimano Guyon	14 November 1974 (aged 28)		(French Polynesia) AS Jeunes Tahitiens
13	DF	Larry Marmouyet	26 November 1980 (aged 22)		(French Polynesia) AS Tefana
14	MF	Abel Terevarua	2 February 1976 (aged 27)		(French Polynesia) AS Tiaré Hinano
15	FW	Raimoana Bennett	15 March 1981 (aged 22)		(French Polynesia) AS Pirae
16	GK	Xavier Samin	1 January 1978 (aged 25)		(French Polynesia) AS Tefana
17	MF	Aldo Tauhara	18 November 1973 (aged 29)		(French Polynesia) AS Manu-Ura
18	DF	Teiki Kohumoetini	Unknown		(French Polynesia) AS Manu-Ura

=== Tonga ===
Coach: (Serbia and Montenegro) Milan Janković

No.	Pos.	Player	Date of birth (age)	Caps	Club
1	GK	Viliami Taufahema	23 September 1974 (aged 28)		(Tonga) Navutoka FC
2	DF	Petelo Vaihu	Unknown		(Tonga) SC Lotohaʻapai
3	DF	Kava Huihahau	8 August 1982 (aged 20)		(New Zealand) Mangere United
4	DF	Sitenilesili Mafi	Unknown		(Tonga) SC Lotohaʻapai
5	MF	Kilifi Uele	14 November 1974 (aged 28)		(Tonga) Vaolongolongo FC
6	FW	Teu Fakava	19 July 1980 (aged 22)		(Tonga) SC Lotoha'apai
7	MF	Mark Uhatahi	24 March 1983 (aged 20)		(Tonga) SC Lotoha'apai
8	MF	Siosiua Maamaloa	4 November 1980 (aged 22)		(Tonga) SC Lotoha'apai
9	MF	Alisione Taufahema	Unknown		(Tonga) Ngeleʻia FC
10	FW	Unaloto Feao	16 January 1982 (aged 21)		(Tonga) Navutoka FC
11	MF	Ipeni Fonu'a	21 July 1981 (aged 21)		(Tonga) Popua FC
12	MF	Maamaloa Tevi	12 December 1982 (aged 20)		(Tonga) SC Lotohaʻapai
13	DF	Makatuʻu Moeaki	27 April 1983 (aged 20)		(Tonga) Ma'ufanga FC
14	MF	Penisimani Pau	12 September 1986 (aged 16)		(Tonga) Ngeleʻia FC
15	MF	Lafaele Moala	22 July 1982 (aged 20)		(Tonga) SC Lotohaʻapai
16	MF	Kamaliele Papani	6 April 1986 (aged 17)		(Tonga) SC Lotohaʻapai
17	DF	Petesa Ongosia	6 November 1979 (aged 23)		(Tonga) Ngeleʻia FC
20	GK	Kavakava Manumu'a	30 October 1982 (aged 20)		(Tonga) SC Lotohaʻapai
