= Tonga Division I =

Second tier of the football league system in Tonga

- Country: Tonga
- Level on pyramid: 2
- Promotion to: Tonga Major League
- Relegation to: Tonga Division II (formerly)
- Domestic cup: Tonga Cup
- Current champions: Longolongo FC (2026)

The Tonga Division I is the second-tier league of football in Tonga, operating under the auspices of the Tonga Football Association.

== Promotion/relegation ==
There is promotion and relegation between the top club in the Division I and bottom club in the Major League, sometimes played as a promotion/relegation playoff. Previously, promotion and relegation also existed between the league and the Tonga Division II.

== Known champions ==
Season	Champion	Ref.
2006	SC Lotohaʻapai	
2009	Longoteme FC	
2010/2011	Veitongo FC	
2019	Nukuhetulu FC	
2026	Longolongo FC	

== See also ==
- Football in Tonga
