= 1985 Tongatapu Inter Club Championship =

Tongatapu Inter Club Championship
- Season: 1985
- Champions: Ngele'ia FC
- Matches played: 156

The 1985 season of the Tongatapu Inter Club Championship was the 12th season of top flight association football competition in Tonga. Ngeleʻia FC won the championship for the fourth time, their fourth title in a then-record of 7 consecutive championships.

== Standings ==
Pos	Team	Pld	W	D	L	Pts
1	Ngele'ia (C)	13	13	0	0	26
2	Navutoka FC	13	11	1	1	23
3	Satellite	13	9	2	2	20
4	Manuka	13	8	1	4	17
5	Veitongo	13	7	2	4	16
6	Munaio	13	6	4	3	16
7	Halaoloveti	13	7	1	5	15
8	Kolofoʻou United	13	4	1	8	9
9	Va-epopua	13	4	0	9	8
10	Halafualeva	13	2	3	8	7
11	Kolofoʻou	13	3	0	10	6
12	'Atenisi United	13	3	0	10	6
13	Sparkles 85	13	2	2	9	6
14	Lotoha'apai	13	2	1	10	5
