= 1975 Lion Shield =

Lion Shield
- Season: 1975
- Champions: Kolofo'ou No.1

The 1975 season of the Lion Shield was the fifth recorded season of top flight association football competition in Tonga. Kolofo'ou No.1 won the championship, their fifth successive title. Navutoka FC were runners-up.

== Teams ==
- Kolofoʻou
- Latakia FC
- Talafo''ou FC
- United Eleven
- Navutoka FC
- Ngeleʻia FC
- Veitongo I
- Veitongo II
