= 1991 Tongatapu Inter Club Championship =

Tongatapu Inter Club Championship
- Season: 1991

The 1991 season of the Tongatapu Inter Club Championship was the 18th season of top flight association football competition in Tonga. The champion of this season is unknown.

== Teams ==
- Halapili
- Popua
- Houmakelikao
- Muniao
- Navutoka
- Veitongo FC
- 'Atenisi United
- Ngeleʻia FC
