= 1982 Tongan A Grade =

Tongan A Grade
- Season: 1982
- Champions: Ngele'ia FC

The 1982 season of the Tongan A Grade was the 9th season of top flight association football competition in Tonga. Ngeleʻia FC won the championship for the first time, their first title in a then-record of 7 consecutive championships. The season began on January 30, 1982 and all matches were played on a Saturday at Mala'e Pangai.

== Teams ==
- Funga'onetaka
- Halapili
- Halafualeva
- Halamaumau Koula
- Lataki FC
- 'Atenisi United
- Kolofoʻou
- Kolomotu'a
- Ma'ufanga
- Nuku'alofa Strikers
- Ngeleʻia FC
- 'Utulau FC
- Veitongo FC
