= Tonga women's national football team =

National association football team

Tonga
- Nickname: Mataliki
- Association: Tonga Football Association
- Confederation: OFC (Oceania)
- Head coach: (Tonga) Kilifi Uele
- Most caps: Penateti Feke (15)
- Top scorer: Fololeni Siale (6)
- Home stadium: Teufaiva Sport Stadium
- FIFA code: TGA

FIFA ranking
- Current: 115 ▲1 (16 June 2026)
- Highest: 53 (December 2005 – September 2006)
- Lowest: 116 (December 2025)

First international
- Tonga 3–2 Vanuatu (Nausori, Fiji; 30 June 2003)

Biggest win
- American Samoa 0–12 Tonga (Apia, Samoa; 15 July 2019)

Biggest defeat
- New Zealand 16–0 Tonga (Kokopo, Papua New Guinea; 25 October 2014); Philippines 16–0 Tonga (Sydney, Australia; 22 April 2022)

OFC Women's Nations Cup
- Appearances: 6 (first in 2007)
- Best result: Third place (2007)

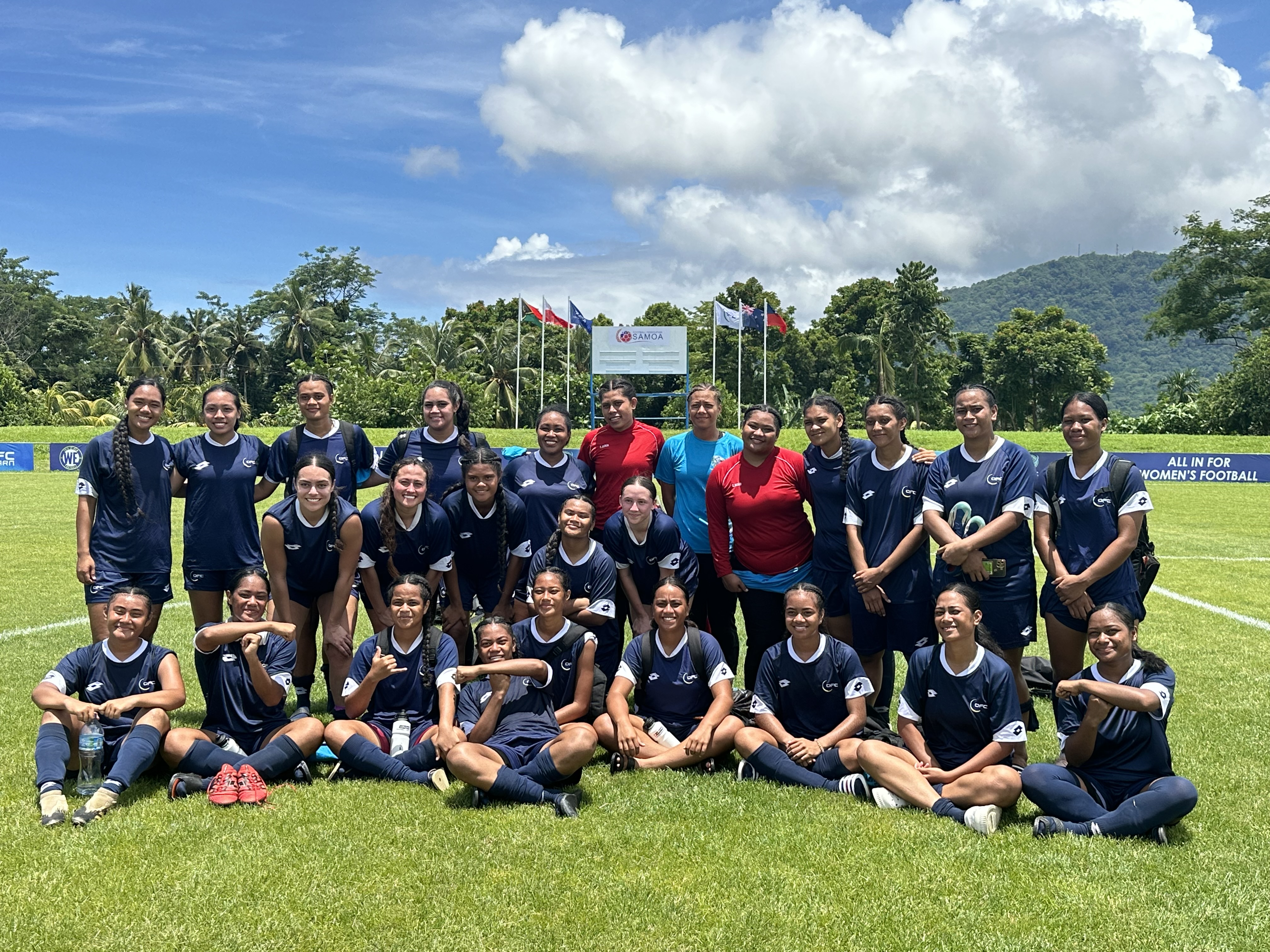
2024 Mataliki Team Oceania Olympic Qualifiers

The Tongan Women's National Football Team (Tongan: timi soka fakafonua fefine ʻa Tonga) represents the Kingdom of Tonga in international women's football. The team, nicknamed "Mataliki" by HRH Princess Lātūfuipeka, is controlled by the Tonga Football Association, and is a member of the Oceania Football Confederation. The squad is composed of local and international players.

Mataliki's best result was Third in the 2007 OFC Women's Championship. Their program's impressive progress was showcased recently at the 2024 Oceania Olympic Qualifiers, where they held New Zealand's National Team to 3 goals (including a shutout second half) and defeated Vanuatu 2–1.

In 2025, they participated in the 2025 OFC Women's Nations Cup, losing all three games in the Group Stage before beating the Cook Islands 1–0 in the seventh-place match. Later in November 2025, they participated in the first round of the OFC qualification for the 2027 FIFA Women's World Cup as one of the four lowest-ranked national teams in the OFC confederation. In the first round, they lost 0–3 to American Samoa, ending their chance of participating in the 2027 FIFA Women's World Cup. Their last match of 2025 was a FIFA-sanctioned friendly against Tahiti (which had lost 0–1 to the Cook Islands 3 days prior), in which they won 4–1.

As of November 2025, Mataliki is ranked 116th in the FIFA Women's World Ranking.

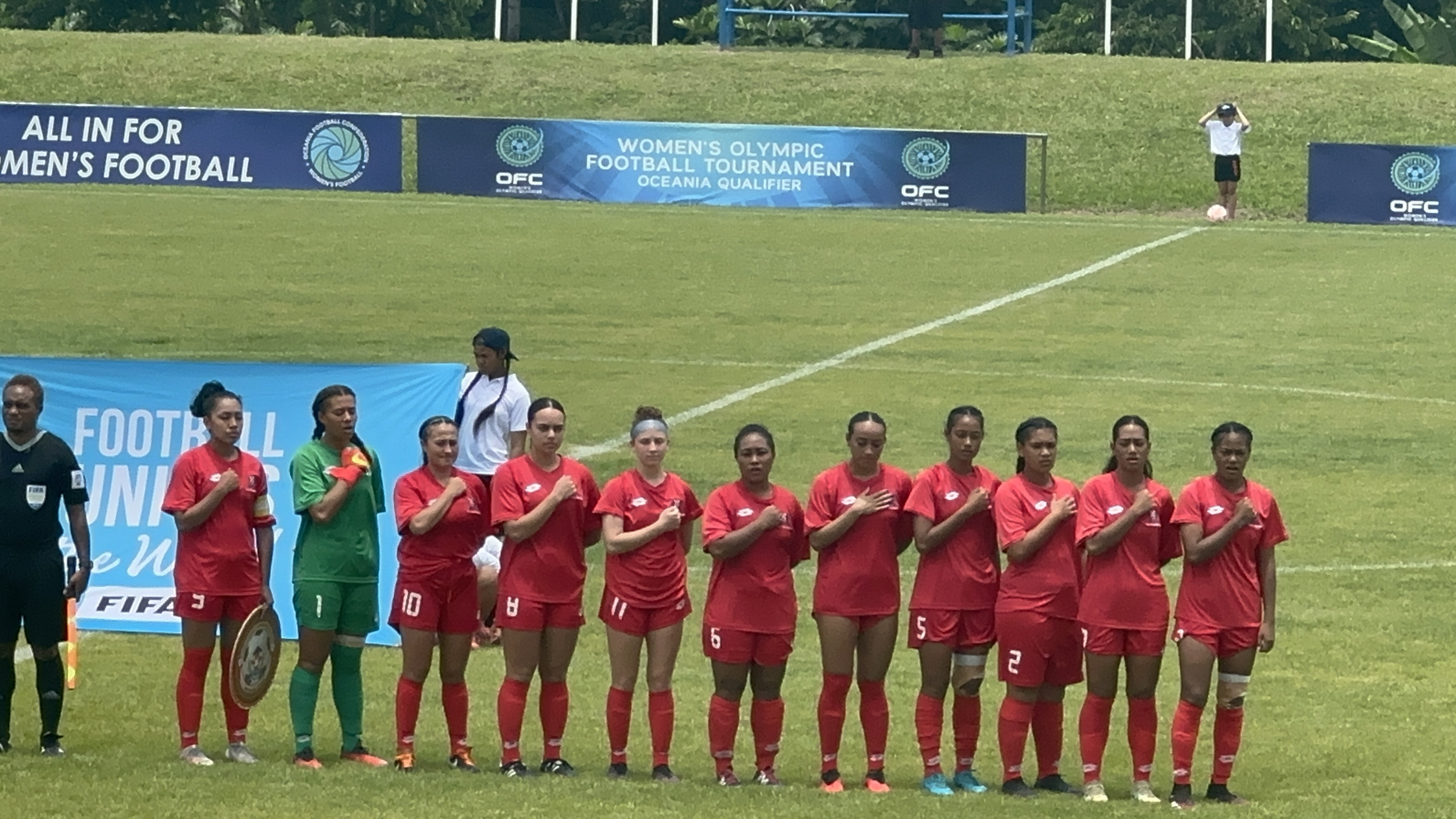
Tongan National Team at 2024 Oceania Olympic Qualifiers

== Results and fixtures ==
The following is a list of match results in the last 12 months, as well as any future matches that have been scheduled.

Legend

Win Draw Lose Void or postponed Fixture

=== 2025 ===
28 November 2025 2027 FIFA Women's World Cup qualification in Oceania region	Tonga	0–3	American Samoa	Avarua, Cook Islands
11:00 UTC−10		Report (FIFA); Report (OFC)	Drago 45+3', 76'; Tu'ua 90+5'	Stadium: Cook Islands Football Academy (CIFA) Field (Field 1); Attendance: 100; Referee: Beth Rattray (New Zealand)

1 December 2025 Friendly	Tonga	4–1	Tahiti	Avarua, Cook Islands
16:00 UTC−10	McNeese 13', 52'; Moala 54'; T.Tonga 90'	Report (OFC)	Mai 9'	Stadium: Cook Islands Football Academy (CIFA) Field (Field 1); Referee: Torika Delai (Fiji)

== Coaching staff ==
As of 10 February 2024

Position	Name
President of Women’s Football	Adelaide Tuivailala
Head coach	Kilifi Uele

=== Manager history ===
- Mark Uhatahi(20??-2023)
- Kilifi Uele(2023–present)

== Players ==
=== Current squad ===
- The following players were named to the squad for the 2027 FIFA Women's World Cup qualification in Oceania region between 28 November and 1 December 2025.

No.	Pos.	Player	Date of birth (age)	Club
1	GK	Carollyne Fotu	13 May 2006 (aged 19)	(Tonga Football Association) Nukuhetulu FC
20	GK	'Ofa Filimone	23 February 2009 (aged 16)	(Tonga Football Association) Ha'ateiho FC
21	GK	Melaia Polovili	22 September 2004 (aged 21)	(Tonga Football Association) Veitongo FC
2	DF	Vika Mafi	13 January 2007 (aged 18)	(Tonga Football Association) Veitongo FC
3	DF	Grystal Fotu	19 September 2007 (aged 18)	(Tonga Football Association) Nukuhetulu FC
4	DF	'Anau Lopeti	30 April 2008 (aged 17)	(Tonga Football Association) Longolongo FC
5	DF	'Ofaloto La'akulu	9 April 1996 (aged 29)	(Tonga Football Association) Veitongo FC
6	DF	Daviana Vaka	11 August 2001 (aged 24)	(United States Soccer Federation) Sporting JAX
12	DF	'Ana Talasinga	1 May 2006 (aged 19)	(Tonga Football Association) Veitongo FC
14	DF	Lavinia Afu	28 May 2005 (aged 20)	(Tonga Football Association) Longolongo FC
15	DF	Patiola Tonga	15 December 2003 (aged 21)	(Tonga Football Association) Nukuhetulu FC
19	DF	Anamalia Vahe	23 June 2009 (aged 16)	(Tonga Football Association) Longolongo FC
8	MF	Tema Tonga	5 March 2008 (aged 17)	(Tonga Football Association) Nukuhetulu FC
18	MF	Polini Ta'ofi	10 May 2010 (aged 15)	(Tonga Football Association) Ha'ateiho FC
7	FW	Lositika Feke	10 April 2003 (aged 22)	(Tonga Football Association) Longolongo FC
9	FW	Loma McNeese	1 August 2002 (aged 23)	(Football Association of Iceland) HK Kópavogur
10	FW	Tama'a Faletau	12 May 2007 (aged 18)	(Tonga Football Association) Veitongo FC
11	FW	'Ana Folovili	4 March 2002 (aged 23)	(Tonga Football Association) Veitongo FC
13	FW	Anna Pongi	21 February 2003 (aged 22)	(Tonga Football Association) Veitongo FC
17	FW	Sophiana Moala	9 January 2010 (aged 15)	(Tonga Football Association) Nukuhetulu FC

=== Previous National Players ===
The following players have previously been members of the Tongan National Team.

Pos.	Player	Date of birth (age)	Caps	Goals	Club	Latest call-up

== Competitive record ==
=== FIFA Women's World Cup ===
FIFA Women's World Cup									Qualification record					
Year	Result	Position	GP	W	D*	L	GF	GA	GP	W	D*	L	GF	GA
(China) 1991	Not member of FIFA								Not member of FIFA					
(Sweden) 1995	Did not enter								Did not enter					
(United States) 1999	Did not enter								Did not enter					
(United States) 2003	Did not enter								Did not enter					
(China) 2007	Did not qualify								3	0	1	2	1	7
(Germany) 2011	Did not qualify								3	1	0	2	1	8
(Canada) 2015	Did not qualify								3	0	1	2	1	20
(France) 2019	Did not qualify								3	1	0	2	1	23
(Australia) (New Zealand) 2023	Did not qualify								3	0	2	1	4	6
(Brazil) 2027	Did not qualify								1	0	0	1	0	3
Total	–	0/10	0	0	0	0	0	0	15	2	4	9	8	64

=== OFC Women's Nations Cup ===
OFC Women's Nations Cup
Year	Result	Position	GP	W	D*	L	GF	GA
(New Caledonia) 1983	Did not enter							
(New Zealand) 1986	Did not enter							
(Australia) 1989	Did not enter							
(Australia) 1991	Did not enter							
(Papua New Guinea) 1994	Did not enter							
(New Zealand) 1998	Did not enter							
(Australia) 2003	Did not enter							
(Papua New Guinea) 2007	Third place	3rd	3	0	1	2	1	7
(New Zealand) 2010	Group stage	6th	3	1	0	2	1	8
(Papua New Guinea) 2014	Fourth place	4th	3	0	1	2	1	20
(New Caledonia) 2018	Group stage	5th	3	1	0	2	1	23
(Fiji) 2022	Quarter-finals	5th	3	0	2	1	4	6
Total	Third place	5/12	15	2	4	9	8	64

*Draws include knockout matches decided on penalty kicks.

=== Pacific Games ===
Pacific Games
Year	Result	Pld	W	D	L	GF	GA	GD
(Fiji) 2003	Third Place	6	3	2	1	10	7	+3
(Samoa) 2007	Second Place	5	2	2	1	4	3	+1
(New Caledonia) 2011	Fourth Place	5	1	1	3	6	6	0
(Papua New Guinea) 2015	Group Stage	3	1	0	2	2	7	−5
(Samoa) 2019	Group Stage	4	2	0	2	16	10	+6
Total	Second Place	23	9	5	9	38	33	+5

=== Pacific Mini Games ===
Pacific Games
Year	Result	Pld	W	D	L	GF	GA	GD
(Vanuatu) 2017	Third Place	3	1	1	1	5	8	−3
Total	Third Place	3	1	1	1	5	8	−3

== See also ==
- Sport in Tonga
  - Football in Tonga
    - Women's football in Tonga
- Tonga men's national football team
