= Tonga national football team =

Tonga
- Nickname: Tu’Ulalupe
- Association: Tonga Football Association (TFA)
- Confederation: OFC (Oceania)
- Head coach: Timote Moleni
- Captain: Hemaloto Polovili
- Most caps: Kilifi Uele (26)
- Top scorer: Unaloto Feao (7)
- Home stadium: Loto-Tonga Soka Centre
- FIFA code: TGA
First colours	Second colours

FIFA ranking
- Current: 198 ▲1 (18 November 2026)
- Highest: 163 (October 1998–December 1998)
- Lowest: 211 (April 2018, July 2019)

First international
- Tahiti 8–0 Tonga (Suva, Fiji; 29 August 1979)

Biggest win
- Tonga 7–0 Federated States of Micronesia (Nausori, Fiji; 5 July 2003)

Biggest defeat
- Tonga 0–22 Australia (Coffs Harbour, Australia; 9 April 2001)

Pacific Games
- Appearances: 6 (first in 1979)
- Best result: Consolation semi-finals (1979)

The Tonga men's national football team (Tongan: timi soka fakafonua ʻa Tonga) represents Tonga in men's international football and is controlled by the Tonga Football Association, which is a part of the Oceania Football Confederation.

== History ==
On 9 April 2001, Tonga lost 0–22 to Australia, and the game became the highest scoring FIFA World Cup qualifying match. The match was an Oceania Football Confederation (OFC) first round qualifying match for the 2002 FIFA World Cup.

== Information ==
=== Football in Tonga ===
Tonga's greatest football triumph to date was their triumph in the first ever Polynesian Cup held in 1993 over Samoa and the Cook Islands. Although local players have not yet made their mark on big leagues abroad, the Chief Executive of the Tonga Football Association, Joe Topou, was appointed to the FIFA Executive Committee in 2002.

In July 2023, Tonga became unranked within the FIFA rankings due to not having played any matches since they lost 8-0 to Papua New Guinea on 18 July 2019.

=== The second Goal project ===
Tonga's second Goal project will develop and improve the national football academy and the association's headquarters in Atele, Tongatapu, which was built in the country's first Goal project. This development work has the aim that all of the Tonga Football Association's needs are fully satisfied. Local matches will be held at the football academy, while the administration's requirements, including the needs of players, officials and spectators, will also be covered. The football school will be transformed into a House of Football.

== Team image ==
=== Kit sponsorship ===
Kit supplier	Period
(Italy) Lotto	2007–2013
(N/A) OFC	2014
None	2016–2019
(Italy) Lotto	2019–2024
(United States) Custom Athletics	2025–

== Fixtures and results ==
=== 2026 ===
10 November 2026 Unofficial friendly	East Coast Bays	11–0	Tonga	Auckland, New Zealand
18:15 NZDT	Delaney; Gaze; Maisey; Petherick; Unknown	Report		Stadium: North Harbour Stadium Turf
Note: Originally scheduled to take place at Bay City Park at 19:00, but was rescheduled and relocated due to weather conditions.

13 November 2026 Unofficial friendly	Mangere United	1–1	Tonga	Auckland, New Zealand
18:30 NZDT	Goal	Report	Falepapalangi	Stadium: Centre Park

16 November 2026 Unofficial friendly	Auckland City U23	5–0	Tonga	Auckland, New Zealand
19:30 NZDT				Stadium: Croatian Cultural Club

19 November 2026 Unofficial friendly	Western Springs	1–6	Tonga	Auckland, New Zealand
19:00 NZDT				Stadium: Seddon Fields

=== 2027 ===
January 2027 2027 Four Nations Cup	Tonga	v	Tuvalu	Auckland, New Zealand

January 2027 2027 Four Nations Cup	Tonga	v	Cook Islands	Auckland, New Zealand

January 2027 2027 Four Nations Cup	Tonga	v	Kiribati	Auckland, New Zealand

== Coaching history ==
- (Tonga) Tongia Nāpa'a (1979)
- (West Germany) Rudi Gutendorf (1981)
- (Italy) Umberto Mottini (1997–1998)
- (Australia) Gary Phillips (2001)
- (Tonga) Heinave Kaifa (2002–2003)
- (Serbia and Montenegro) Milan Janković (2003–2005)
- (England) Ben Perry (2005–2006)
- (Tonga) Reece McLaughlin (2006–2007)
- (Australia) Chris Williams (2011)
- (Tonga) Timote Moleni (2015–2023)
- (Tonga) Kilifi Uele (2024–2025)
- (Tonga) Timote Moleni (2026–)

== Players ==
=== Current squad ===
The following players were called up for the November 2026 tour in New Zealand.

Caps and goals updated as of 9 September 2024, after the game against Samoa.

No.	Pos.	Player	Date of birth (age)	Caps	Goals	Club
1	GK	Semisi ‘Otukolo	23 June 1999 (age 27)	12	0	(Tonga Football Association) Veitongo
2		Manase Talakai				(Tonga Football Association) Lavengatonga
3		Justin To’etu’u				(Tonga Football Association) Longolongo
3		Justin To’etu’u				(Tonga Football Association) Longolongo
4	MF	Fineasi Palei	20 May 1989 (age 37)	12	0	(Tonga Football Association) Longoteme
5	DF	Kulisitofa Kite	17 January 2003 (age 23)	7	1	(Tonga Football Association) Lavengatonga
6		Gershom Mailangi				(Tonga Football Association) Lotoha’apai
7	FW	Viliami Tukia	7 January 2001 (age 25)	2	0	(Tonga Football Association) Navutoka
8	FW	Lisiate Feke	25 March 2004 (age 22)	8	0	(Tonga Football Association) Longolongo
9		Elias Kendler				(Tonga Football Association) Veitongo
10		Tevita Falepapalangi				(Tonga Football Association) Lotoha’apai
11		Sione Taufa				(Tonga Football Association) Lotoha’apai
12	MF	Hakeai Fonua	1 September 2008 (age 18)	0	0	(Tonga Football Association) Lotoha’apai
13		‘Amanaki Lau’i				(Tonga Football Association) Longoteme
14		Sosaia ‘Ilangana				(Tonga Football Association) Longolongo
15		Christopher Fauonuku				(Tonga Football Association) Navutoka
16		Taani Fe’ao				(Tonga Football Association) Marist
17	MF	Herick Funaki	7 August 2003 (age 23)	0	0	(Tonga Football Association) Longolongo
18		Sione Naniseni				(Tonga Football Association) Navutoka
19		Sione ‘Ainu’u				(Tonga Football Association) Folaha
20		Visesio Tolu				(Tonga Football Association) Folaha
21		Anthony Likiliki	9 December 1999 (age 26)			(New Zealand Football)
22		William Senituli	24 February 2002 (age 24)			(New Zealand Football)
23		Topuluka Tu’amoheloa	30 June 2004 (age 22)			(New Zealand Football) Oratia United
24	MF	Tomasi Armitage	26 May 2005 (age 21)	1	0	(New Zealand Football) Waikato Unicol
25		Pau Likiliki				(New Zealand Football) Ellerslie
26		David Tu’amoheloa	30 June 2004 (age 22)			(New Zealand Football) Manukau United

=== Recent call-ups ===
The following players have been called up within the last 12 months.

Pos.	Player	Date of birth (age)	Caps	Goals	Club	Latest call-up

== Player records ==
As of 9 September 2024
Players in bold are still active with Tonga.

=== Most appearances ===
Rank	Name	Caps	Goals	Career
1	Kilifi Uele	26	3	1996–2017
2	Unaloto Fea'o	17	7	2001–2017
2	**Hemaloto Polovili**	17	4	2015–present
4	Lafaele Moala	16	1	2003–2015
5	Folio Moeaki	15	0	2004–2015
5	Sione Uhatahi	15	1	2007–2019
7	Siu'a Ma'amaloa	14	1	2001–2004
7	**Kamaliele Papani**	14	0	2003–present
9	**Semisi 'Otukolo**	12	0	2017–present
9	**Fineasi Palei**	12	0	2011–present

=== Top goalscorers ===
Rank	Name	Goals	Caps	Ratio	Career
1	Unaloto Fea'o	7	17	0.41	2001–2017
2	Lokoua Taufahema	5	7	0.71	2001–2011
3	**Hemaloto Polovili**	4	17	0.24	2015–present
4	Amone Suli	3	1	3	2002
4	**Amoni Fifita**	3	8	0.38	2023–present
4	Mark Uhatahi	3	11	0.27	2003–2015
4	Kilifi Uele	3	26	0.12	1996–2017
8	Ma'ake Uhatahi	2	2	1	2009
8	**Petueli Tokotaha**	2	6	0.33	2017–present
8	Pio Palu	2	7	0.29	2007–2011
8	Timote Moleni	2	8	0.25	1996–2001
8	Filisione Taufahema	2	8	0.25	2001–2002

== Competitive record ==
=== FIFA World Cup ===
FIFA World Cup										Qualification					
Year	Host	Result	Position	Pld	W	D*	L	F	A	Pld	W	D	L	F	A
1930 to 1990		Not member of FIFA								Not member of FIFA					
1994	United States	Did not enter								Did not enter					
1998	France	Did not qualify								4	2	0	2	3	13
2002	South Korea; Japan	Did not qualify								4	2	0	2	7	30
2006	Germany	Did not qualify								4	1	0	3	2	17
2010	South Africa	Did not qualify								4	1	0	3	6	10
2014	Brazil	Did not qualify								3	1	1	1	4	4
2018	Russia	Did not qualify								3	0	0	3	1	8
2022	Qatar	Withdrew								Withdrew					
2026	Canada; Mexico; United States	Did not qualify								2	1	0	1	4	3
2030	Morocco; Portugal; Spain	To be determined								To be determined					
2034	Saudi Arabia	To be determined								To be determined					
Total		—	0/8	–	–	–	–	–	–	24	8	1	15	27	85

=== OFC Nations Cup ===
Oceania Cup / OFC Nations Cup record									Qualification record					
Year	Result	Position	Pld	W	D*	L	GF	GA	Pld	W	D	L	GF	GA
(New Zealand) 1973	Did not enter								Did not enter					
(New Caledonia) 1980	Did not enter								Did not enter					
(Pacific Community) 1996	Did not qualify								3	1	1	1	4	4
(Australia) 1998	Did not qualify								4	1	1	2	5	9
(French Polynesia) 2000	Did not qualify								4	1	0	3	4	15
(New Zealand) 2002	Did not qualify								4	1	0	3	7	18
(Australia) 2004	Did not qualify								4	1	0	3	2	17
(Pacific Community) 2008	Did not qualify								4	1	0	3	6	10
(Solomon Islands) 2012	Did not qualify								3	1	1	1	4	4
(Papua New Guinea) 2016	Did not qualify								3	0	0	3	1	8
(Fiji) (Vanuatu) 2024	Did not qualify								2	0	0	2	1	5
Total	—	0/11	–	–	–	–	–	–	31	7	3	21	34	90

=== Pacific Games ===
Pacific Games record
Year	Round	Position	Pld	W	D*	L	GF	GA
(Fiji) 1963	Did not enter							
(New Caledonia) 1966	Did not enter							
(Papua New Guinea) 1969	Did not enter							
(French Polynesia) 1971	Did not enter							
(Guam) 1975	Did not enter							
(Fiji) 1979	Group stage	7th	4	1	0	3	5	20
(Samoa) 1983	Group stage	7th	3	1	1	1	6	8
(New Caledonia) 1987	Did not enter							
(Papua New Guinea) 1991	Did not enter							
(French Polynesia) 1995	Did not enter							
(Fiji) 2003	Group stage	7th	4	1	1	2	9	10
(Samoa) 2007	Group stage	7th	4	1	0	3	6	10
(New Caledonia) 2011	Did not enter							
(Papua New Guinea) 2015	N/A – tournament was U23							
(Samoa) 2019	Group stage	11th	4	0	0	4	0	37
(Solomon Islands) 2023	Group stage	11th	4	1	0	3	7	13
Total	Group stage	6/16	23	5	2	17	31	98

=== Pacific Mini Games ===
Pacific Mini Games record
Year	Round	Position	Pld	W	D*	L	GF	GA
(Solomon Islands) 1981	Did not enter							
(Vanuatu) 1993	Group stage	7th	3	0	0	3	0	19
(Vanuatu) 2017	Sixth place	6th	5	0	0	5	5	25
Total	Sixth place	2/3	8	0	0	8	5	44

=== Polynesia Cup ===
Polynesia Cup record
Year	Round	Position	Pld	W	D*	L	GF	GA
(Samoa) 1994	Runners-up	2nd	3	1	1	1	4	4
(Cook Islands) 1998	Fourth place	4th	4	1	1	2	5	9
(French Polynesia) 2000	Fourth place	4th	4	1	0	3	4	15
Total	Runners-up	3/3	11	3	2	6	13	28

== Head-to-head record ==
Up to matches played on 6 September 2024.

Team	Pld	W	D	L	GF	GA	GD	WPCT
American Samoa	10	8	0	2	34	12	+22	80.00
Australia	1	0	0	1	0	22	−22	0.00
Cook Islands	11	4	2	5	15	16	−1	36.36
Federated States of Micronesia	1	1	0	0	7	0	+7	100.00
Fiji	3	0	0	3	1	17	−16	0.00
New Caledonia	6	0	0	6	2	43	−41	0.00
Papua New Guinea	4	0	1	3	2	20	−18	0.00
Samoa (Note: Includes results as Western Samoa.)	13	2	3	8	11	27	−16	15.38
Solomon Islands	5	0	0	5	0	31	−31	0.00
Tahiti	6	0	0	6	1	28	−27	0.00
Tuvalu	3	0	0	3	6	13	−7	0.00
Vanuatu (Note: Includes results as New Hebrides.)	5	0	0	5	2	33	−31	0.00
Wallis and Futuna	2	1	0	1	1	3	−2	50.00
Total	70	16	6	48	82	265	−183	22.86

Source: Results

== Honours ==
=== Subcontinental ===
- Polynesia Cup
  - (silver) Runners-up (1): 1994

== Historical kits ==
2001 Home	2001 Away	2009 Home	2009 Away	2011 Home	2011 Away	2015 Home	2015 Away

2017 Home	2017 Away	2019 Home	2019 Away	2023 Home	2023 Away

== See also ==
- Tonga national under-23 football team
- Tonga national under-20 football team
- Tonga national under-17 football team
- Tonga women's national football team
- Tonga women's national under-20 football team
