= 1996 OFC Nations Cup squads =

The following is a list of players used by each competing nation during the entirety of the 1996 OFC Nations Cup.

== New Zealand ==
Coach: (Scotland) Keith Pritchett

No.	Pos.	Player	Date of birth (age)	Caps	Goals	Club
	GK	Jason Batty	23 March 1973 (aged 23)			(New Zealand Football) North Shore United
	GK	Alan Stroud	23 August 1965 (aged 31)			(New Zealand Football) Christchurch United
	DF	Chris Zoricich	5 March 1969 (aged 27)			(Football Australia) Brisbane Strikers
	DF	Rodger Gray	6 May 1966 (aged 30)			(New Zealand Football) Waitakere City
	DF	Andy Rennie				(New Zealand Football) Napier City Rovers
	DF	Alun Evans	17 February 1965 (aged 31)			(New Zealand Football) Woolston WMC
	MF	Michael McGarry	17 May 1965 (aged 31)			(New Zealand Football) Miramar Rangers
	MF	Heremaia Ngata	24 August 1971 (aged 25)			(New Zealand Football) Thomastown Zebras
	MF	Chris Jackson	18 July 1970 (aged 26)			(New Zealand Football) Miramar Rangers
	MF	Stu Jacobs	25 October 1965 (aged 31)			(New Zealand Football) Miramar Rangers
	MF	Simon Elliott	10 June 1974 (aged 22)			(New Zealand Football) Wellington College
	FW	Darren McClennan	21 October 1965 (aged 31)			(New Zealand Football) Mount Wellington
	FW	Mark Elrick	7 April 1967 (aged 29)			(New Zealand Football) Waitakere City
	FW	Vaughan Coveny	13 December 1971 (aged 24)			(Football Australia) South Melbourne FC
	MF	Thomas Edge	6 April 1970 (aged 26)			(New Zealand Football) Waitakere City

== Australia ==
Coach: (Scotland) Eddie Thomson and (Argentina) Raul Blanco (caretaker)

No.	Pos.	Player	Date of birth (age)	Caps	Goals	Club
	GK	Frank Juric	28 October 1973 (aged 23)			(Football Australia) Collingwood Warriors
	GK	Zeljko Kalac	16 December 1972 (aged 23)			(Football Australia) Sydney United
	DF	Milan Blagojevic	24 December 1969 (aged 26)			(Football Australia) Sydney Olympic
	DF	Robbie Hooker	6 March 1967 (aged 29)			(Football Australia) West Adelaide
	DF	Milan Ivanovic	21 December 1960 (aged 35)			(Football Australia) Adelaide City
	DF	Tony Popovic	4 July 1973 (aged 23)			(Football Australia) Sydney United
	DF	Alex Tobin	3 November 1965 (aged 31)			(Football Australia) Adelaide City
	MF	Matthew Bingley	16 August 1971 (aged 25)			(Football Australia) Marconi Stallions
	MF	Sean Cranney	2 October 1973 (aged 23)			(Football Australia) Brisbane Strikers
	MF	Robert Enes	22 August 1975 (aged 21)			(Football Australia) Sydney United
	MF	Craig Foster	15 April 1969 (aged 27)			(Football Australia) Marconi Stallions
	MF	Andrew Marth	10 February 1969 (aged 27)			(Football Australia) Melbourne Knights
	MF	Jason Polak	9 January 1968 (aged 28)			(Football Australia) South Melbourne
	MF	Ernie Tapai	14 February 1967 (aged 29)			(Football Australia) Collingwood Warriors
	DF	Danny Tiatto	22 May 1973 (aged 23)			(Football Australia) Adelaide City
	MF	Paul Wade (C)	10 March 1961 (aged 35)			(Football Australia) Canberra Cosmos
	FW	Alistair Edwards	21 June 1968 (aged 28)			(Football Australia) Sydney Olympic
	FW	John Markovski	15 April 1970 (aged 26)			(Football Australia) Canberra Cosmos
	FW	Damian Mori	30 September 1970 (aged 26)			(Football Australia) Adelaide City
	FW	Warren Spink	21 June 1968 (aged 28)			(Football Australia) South Melbourne
	FW	Joe Spiteri	6 May 1973 (aged 23)			(Football Australia) Melbourne Knights
	FW	Kris Trajanovski	19 February 1972 (aged 24)			(Football Australia) Sydney Olympic
	FW	Paul Trimboli	25 February 1969 (aged 27)			(Football Australia) South Melbourne

== Tahiti ==
Coach: (Italy) Umberto Mottini

No.	Pos.	Player	Date of birth (age)	Caps	Goals	Club
	GK	Jason Burgess	8 October 1966 (aged 30)			(Tahitian Football Federation)
	GK	Laurent Heinis	7 July 1968 (aged 28)			(Tahitian Football Federation) A.S. Vénus
	GK	Ricky Fassain	20 May 1972 (aged 24)			(Tahitian Football Federation)
	DF	Eric Etaeta	2 March 1969 (aged 27)			(Tahitian Football Federation)
	DF	Jean Ludivion	6 October 1973 (aged 23)			(Tahitian Football Federation)
	DF	Bernard Erolas				(Tahitian Football Federation)
	DF	Willy Tapi				(Tahitian Football Federation)
	DF	Vetea Laison (C)	21 April 1971 (aged 25)			(Tahitian Football Federation)
	DF	Coco Fenuati				(Tahitian Football Federation)
	DF	John Thunot	17 February 1966 (aged 30)			(Tahitian Football Federation)
	MF	Farahia Teuira	29 August 1972 (aged 24)			(Tahitian Football Federation) A.S. Vaiete
	MF	Stephane Tuairau	29 June 1975 (aged 21)			(Tahitian Football Federation)
	MF	Tehina Tahitotera				(Tahitian Football Federation)
	MF	Rupena Raumati				(Tahitian Football Federation)
	FW	Heimana Vaiho	18 July 1971 (aged 25)			(Tahitian Football Federation)
	MF	Reynald Temarii	2 July 1967 (aged 29)			(Tahitian Football Federation)
	MF	Eddy Etaeta	1 June 1970 (aged 26)			(Tahitian Football Federation) A.S. Vénus
	MF	Hiro Labaste	5 January 1973 (aged 23)			(Tahitian Football Federation)
	MF	Jean-Paul Wong				(Tahitian Football Federation)
	FW	Jean-Loup Rousseau	27 March 1970 (aged 26)			(Tahitian Football Federation)
	FW	Stephane Tuairau	29 June 1975 (aged 21)			(Tahitian Football Federation) A.S. Manu-Ura
	FW	Heimana Salem	1 February 1973 (aged 23)			(Tahitian Football Federation)
	FW	Tetahio Auraa	9 July 1973 (aged 23)			(Tahitian Football Federation) A.S. Manu-Ura
	FW	Naea Bennett	8 July 1977 (aged 19)			(Tahitian Football Federation) A.S. Vénus
	FW	Patrick Appriou	28 July 1965 (aged 31)			(Tahitian Football Federation)
	FW	Thomas Zaheran				(Tahitian Football Federation)
	FW	Meheanun Gatien				(Tahitian Football Federation)

== Solomon Islands ==
Coach: Edward Ngara

No.	Pos.	Player	Date of birth (age)	Caps	Goals	Club
	GK	Severino Aefi	15 October 1970 (aged 26)			(Solomon Islands Football Federation) Las United FC
	GK	Joseph Bati				(Solomon Islands Football Federation)
	DF	John Tanisapa	12 April 1965 (aged 31)			(Solomon Islands Football Federation)
	DF	Saeni Daudau	4 September 1978 (aged 18)			(Solomon Islands Football Federation) Koloale
	DF	Timothy Inifiri	2 June 1966 (aged 30)			(Solomon Islands Football Federation)
	DF	Jeffrey Karomae (C)				(Solomon Islands Football Federation)
	DF	Gideon Omokirio	12 October 1976 (aged 20)			(Solomon Islands Football Federation) Laugu
	MF	Charles Ashley				(Solomon Islands Football Federation)
	MF	Matai Vave	14 October 1963 (aged 33)			(Solomon Islands Football Federation)
	MF	George Kiriau	3 February 1969 (aged 27)			(Solomon Islands Football Federation)
	MF	Augustine Peli	15 June 1970 (aged 26)			(Solomon Islands Football Federation)
	MF	Robert Seni	9 June 1977 (aged 19)			(Solomon Islands Football Federation) Kossa
	MF	Batram Suri	2 November 1971 (aged 25)			(New Zealand Football) Nelson Suburbs
	MF	Edward Rukumana	8 August 1975 (aged 21)			(Solomon Islands Football Federation)
	FW	Noel Berry	18 December 1969 (aged 26)			(Solomon Islands Football Federation)
	FW	Steven Abana				(Solomon Islands Football Federation)
	FW	Wale Diu				(Solomon Islands Football Federation)
	FW	Beuka Wali				(Solomon Islands Football Federation)
	FW	Hollies Vato				(Solomon Islands Football Federation)
	MF	Coleman Maniadalo	15 January 1970 (aged 26)			(Solomon Islands Football Federation) Naha FC
	FW	Richard Bobby				(Solomon Islands Football Federation)
	FW	Daniel Wabo	26 August 1978 (aged 18)			(Solomon Islands Football Federation)
