= 1983 Tongan A Grade =

Tongan A Grade
- Season: 1983
- Champions: Ngele'ia FC

The 1983 season of the Tongan A Grade was the 10th season of top flight association football competition in Tonga. Ngeleʻia FC won the championship for the second time, their second title in a then-record of 7 consecutive championships.

== Teams ==
- Fanga-'o-Pilolevu
- Halapili
- Halafuoleva
- Kolisi 'Atenisi
- Kolofoʻou
- Kolomotu'a
- Ma'ufanga
- Navutoka FC
- Ngeleʻia FC
- Tofoa FC
- Tonga High School
- 'Utulau FC
- Veitongo FC
