= 1982 Lion Shield =

Lion Shield
- Season: 1971–72
- Champions: Kolofo'ou No.1, Veitongo and Ngeleia

The 1982 season of the Lion Shield was the fourth recorded season of top flight association football competition in Tonga, with the results of any competitions that took place between 1972 and 1981 unknown. Ngeleia won the championship, their second recorded championship since their shared title in 1971–72 with Kolofo'ou No.1 and Veitongo after they all finished level on 18 points after eleven games.
