= 1998 Tonga Club Championship =

Tonga Club Championship
- Season: 1998
- Champions: Lotoha'apai United

The 1998 season of the Tonga Club Championship was the 20th season of top flight association football competition in Tonga. Lotohaʻapai United won the championship for the first time, beginning the 11 title record streak in the Tonga Major League. Lotohaʻapai United beat Kolofoʻou FC 2–1 in the knockout final.

== Standings ==
Top 3 teams on the table:

1. Lotohaʻapai United
2. Vaolongolongo
3. Ma'ufanga
