= 1990 Tongatapu Inter Club Championship =

Tongatapu Inter Club Championship
- Season: 1990
- Champions: Ngele'ia FC

The 1990 season of the Tongatapu Inter Club Championship was the 17th season of top flight association football competition in Tonga. Ngeleʻia FC won the championship for the eighth time.

== Teams ==
- Halapili
- Houmakelikao
- Houmakelikao B
- Muniao
- Navutoka
- Navutoka B
- Veitongo FC
- 'Atenisi United
- Ngeleʻia FC
- Va'epopua
- British Petroleum
