= 1984 Tongatapu Inter Club Championship =

Tongatapu Inter Club Championship
- Season: 1984
- Champions: Ngele'ia FC
- Matches played: 156

The 1984 season of the Tongatapu Inter Club Championship was the 11th season of top flight association football competition in Tonga. Ngeleʻia FC won the championship for the third time, their third title in a then-record of 7 consecutive championships.

== Standings ==
Pos	Team	Pld	W	D	L	Pts
1	Ngele'ia (C)	13	13	0	0	26
2	Navutoka FC	13	10	0	3	20
3	Manuka	13	9	1	3	19
4	Veitongo	13	8	2	3	18
5	Muniao	13	8	2	3	18
6	Kolofo'ou	13	6	4	3	13
7	Paionia	13	6	1	6	13
8	Tofoa	13	5	2	6	12
9	Kolofo'ou United	13	5	1	7	11
10	'Atenisi United	13	4	0	9	8
11	Ma'ufanga	13	3	1	9	7
12	Va'epopua	13	2	2	9	6
13	Halamaumaukoula	13	3	0	10	6
14	Kolomotua	13	1	0	12	2
