= 2006 OFC Club Championship =

Tournament details
- Dates: 6 February – 21 May 2006
- Teams: 11 (from 10 associations)

Final positions
- Champions: (New Zealand) Auckland City (1st title)
- Runners-up: (French Polynesia) Pirae

Tournament statistics
- Matches played: 22
- Goals scored: 96 (4.36 per match)
- Top scorer(s): (Solomon Islands) Benjamin Totori (7 goals)

The 2006 OFC Club Championship was the 5th edition of the top-level Oceanic club football tournament organized by the Oceania Football Confederation (OFC), and the last tournament before it was rebranded as the OFC Champions League. The qualifying round was held at Govind Park in Ba, Fiji, from 6 February until 10 February 2006, with the main competition taking place at the North Harbour Stadium in Albany, New Zealand from 10 May until 21 May 2006.

The tournament was the first of its kind to not have a representative from Australia competing, due to the nation's migration to the Asian Football Confederation, meaning that Sydney FC could not defend their 2005 title and the winners of the competition would for the first time be from a nation outside of Australia.

Australia's departure from the OFC meant that qualification for the 2006 FIFA Club World Cup was under question – in March 2006 it was reported that the Oceania champions would have to play a preliminary match against the J. League champions for a place in the main competition. However, later that month, it was announced that FIFA president Sepp Blatter had been unable to get the necessary support for the new format and as a result Oceania retained direct entry to 2006 FIFA Club World Cup. FIFA reviewed the format the following year.

The winner of the tournament was Auckland City of New Zealand, who beat AS Pirae of Tahiti in the final.

== Participants ==
Location of teams of the 2006 OFC Champions League.
Automatic entrants
Preliminary round entrants

The following teams entered the competition.

Association	Team	Qualifying method
Teams entering the group stage
New Caledonia	AS Magenta	2004–05 New Caledonia Super Ligue champion
New Zealand	Auckland City	2005–06 New Zealand Football Championship grand final champion 2005–06 New Zealand Football Championship regular season premier
New Zealand	YoungHeart Manawatu	2005–06 New Zealand Football Championship regular season runner-up
Papua New Guinea	Sobou FC	2005 Papua New Guinea National Club Championship champion
Solomon Islands	Makuru FC	2006 Solomon Islands National Club Championship champion
(French Polynesia) Tahiti	AS Pirae	2004–05 Tahiti Division Fédérale champion
Vanuatu	Tafea FC	2005 Vanuatu National Super League champion
Teams entering the preliminary round
American Samoa	PanSa (Note: PanSa withdrew from the competition.)	2005 ASFA Soccer League champion
Cook Islands	Nikao Sokattak	2005 Cook Islands Round Cup champion
Fiji	Nokia Eagles	2006 Fiji Club Franchise League champion
Samoa	Tuanaimato Breeze	2005 Samoa National League champion
Tonga	Lotoha'apai United	2005 Tonga Major League champion

== Preliminary round ==
A preliminary round was held to determine the 8th and final participant in the final. The format was a group stage, with each team playing each other once. The winner of the group would qualify for the main draw.

Pos	Team	Pld	W	D	L	GF	GA	GD	Pts	Qualification
1	(Fiji) Nokia Eagles	3	2	1	0	7	2	+5	7	Advance to group stage
2	(Samoa) Tuanaimato Breeze	3	1	1	1	4	4	0	4	
3	(Tonga) Lotohaʻapai	3	1	1	1	5	7	−2	4	
4	(Cook Islands) Nikao Sokattak	3	0	1	2	2	5	−3	1	

Source: RSSSF
6 February 2006
14:00

Nikao Sokattak (Cook Islands)	1–2	(Samoa) Tuanaimato Breeze
Tisam 15'	Report	Fa'aiuaso 72', 77'

Govind Park, Ba, Fiji
6 February 2006
16:00

Lotohaʻapai (Tonga)	1–5	(Fiji) Nokia Eagles
Vaihu 31'	Report	Tamanisau 17'; Nawatu 41'; Duguca 59'; Sabutu 81', 88'

Govind Park, Ba, Fiji

8 February 2006
14:00

Lotohaʻapai (Tonga)	3–1	(Cook Islands) Nikao Sokattak
Moala 54'; Makasini 61'; Uhatahi 67'	Report	Willis 10'

Govind Park, Ba, Fiji
8 February 2006
16:00

Nokia Eagles (Fiji)	2–1	(Samoa) Tuanaimato Breeze
Tamanisau 55'; Bolaitoga 77'	Report	Fa'aiuaso 27'

Govind Park, Ba, Fiji

10 February 2006
14:00

Lotohaʻapai (Tonga)	1–1	(Samoa) Tuanaimato Breeze
Uhatahi 85'	Report	Esau 32'

Govind Park, Ba, Fiji
10 February 2006
16:00

Nokia Eagles (Fiji)	0–0	(Cook Islands) Nikao Sokattak
	Report

Govind Park, Ba, Fiji

== Group stage ==
The eight remaining teams were separated into two groups, each team playing the other teams once. The top two teams from each group progressed to the semi-finals.

=== Group A ===
Pos	Team	Pld	W	D	L	GF	GA	GD	Pts	Qualification
1	(New Zealand) Auckland City	3	3	0	0	11	1	+10	9	Advance to knockout stage
2	(French Polynesia) AS Pirae	3	2	0	1	17	2	+15	6	Advance to knockout stage
3	(Solomon Islands) Marist	3	1	0	2	9	14	−5	3	
4	(Papua New Guinea) Sobou	3	0	0	3	1	21	−20	0	

Source: RSSSF
10 May 2006

Marist (Solomon Islands)	1–10	(French Polynesia) AS Pirae
Iniga 90+'	Report	Hmaé 21' (pen.), 53', 90'; Bennett 32', 48', 66', 69'; Fa'aiuaso 45'; Williams 67', 82'

North Harbour Stadium, Auckland
10 May 2006

Auckland City (New Zealand)	7–0	(Papua New Guinea) Sobou
Jordan 11'; Young 38'; Mulrooney 53'; G. Little 66', 76'; B. Little 69'; Hayne 90+'	Report

North Harbour Stadium, Auckland

13 May 2006

Auckland City (New Zealand)	3–1	(Solomon Islands) Marist
Urlovic 14'; Young 31'; Little 84' (pen.)	Report	Misiga 68'

North Harbour Stadium, Auckland
14 May 2006

AS Pirae (French Polynesia)	7–0	(Papua New Guinea) Sobou
Williams 16', 54', 79'; Luenu 27', 64'; Fa'aiuaso 77', 90'	Report

North Harbour Stadium, Auckland

16 May 2006
12:00

Sobou (Papua New Guinea)	1–7	(Solomon Islands) Marist
Wate 45+'	Report	Samani 31', 37' (pen.), 43'; Iniga 45'; Wayne 54'; Wagiro 74'; Misiga 82'

North Harbour Stadium – Domain 3 (Note: Originally to set to take place at North Harbour Stadium's main pitch, it was relocated to Domain 3 of North Harbour Stadium, due to heavy rainfall.), Auckland
16 May 2006
14:15

AS Pirae (French Polynesia)	0–1	(New Zealand) Auckland City
	Report	Little 85'

North Harbour Stadium – Domain 3, Auckland

=== Group B ===
Pos	Team	Pld	W	D	L	GF	GA	GD	Pts	Qualification
1	(New Zealand) YoungHeart Manawatu	3	1	2	0	8	5	+3	5	Advance to knockout stage
2	(Fiji) Nokia Eagles	3	1	1	1	6	3	+3	4	Advance to knockout stage
3	(Vanuatu) Tafea	3	1	1	1	4	7	−3	4	
4	(New Caledonia) AS Magenta	3	1	0	2	1	4	−3	3	

Source: RSSSF
11 May 2006

AS Magenta (New Caledonia)	0–1	(Vanuatu) Tafea
	Report	Vava 90+'

North Harbour Stadium, Auckland
11 May 2006

Nokia Eagles (Fiji)	2–2	(New Zealand) YoungHeart Manawatu
Turuva 18' (pen.); Namaqa 75'	Report	Menapi 39'; Totori 54'

North Harbour Stadium, Auckland

13 May 2006

AS Magenta (New Caledonia)	0–3	(New Zealand) YoungHeart Manawatu
	Report	Menapi 22'; Boyens 87'; Totori 89'

North Harbour Stadium, Auckland
14 May 2006

Tafea (Vanuatu)	0–4	(Fiji) Nokia Eagles
	Report	Namaqa 57'; Vakatalasu 79'; Hassan 83', 90'

North Harbour Stadium, Auckland

16 May 2006
16:00

Tafea (Vanuatu)	3–3	(New Zealand) YoungHeart Manawatu
Nake 23', 49'; Mermer 47'	Report	Menapi 58'; Robinson 72'; Totori 89'

Bill McKinlay Park (Note: Originally set to play at North Harbour Stadium, the match was relocated to Bill McKinlay Park, due to heavy rainfall.), Auckland
16 May 2006
19:30

Nokia Eagles (Fiji)	0–1	(New Caledonia) AS Magenta
	Report	Kaqea 84'

Bill McKinlay Park, Auckland

== Knockout stage ==
=== Bracket ===
Semi-finals
19 May – Auckland
(New Zealand) Auckland City	9
(Fiji) Nokia Eagles	1
19 May – Auckland
(New Zealand) YoungHeart Manawatu	1
(French Polynesia) AS Pirae	2

Final
21 May – Auckland
(New Zealand) Auckland City	3
(French Polynesia) AS Pirae	1
Third place play-off
21 May – Auckland
(Fiji) Nokia Eagles	0
(New Zealand) YoungHeart Manawatu	4

=== Semi-finals ===
19 May 2006

Auckland City (New Zealand)	9–1	(Fiji) Nokia Eagles
Sykes 37'; Seaman 52'; Jordan 55'; Young 61', 62'; Hayne 68'; Bunce 84'; Little 89', 90+'	Report	Tiwa 17'

North Harbour Stadium, Auckland

19 May 2006

YoungHeart Manawatu (New Zealand)	1–2	(French Polynesia) AS Pirae
Totori 61'	Report	Hmaé 1'; Bennett 8'

North Harbour Stadium, Auckland

=== Third place play-off ===
21 May 2006
14:45

Nokia Eagles (Fiji)	0–4	(New Zealand) YoungHeart Manawatu
	Report	Totori (?); Maemae (?)

North Harbour Stadium, Auckland

=== Final ===
The final was played on 21 May 2006 at North Harbour Stadium in Auckland.

21 May 2006
17:00

Auckland City (New Zealand)	3–1	(French Polynesia) AS Pirae
Jordan 23', 41', 63' (pen.)	Report	Fa'aiuaso 84'

North Harbour Stadium, Auckland

== See also ==
- Oceania Club Championship
