= 2010–11 Tonga Major League =

Tonga Major League
- Season: 2010-11
- Champions: Lotoha'apai United

The 2010–11 season of the Tonga Major League was the 32nd season of top flight association football competition in Tonga. Lotohaʻapai United won the championship for the twelfth time.

== Standings ==
Based on known results:

Pos	Team	Pld	W	D	L	GF	GA	GD	Pts	Play-offs
1	Lotoha'apai United (C)	4	3	1	0	12	2	+10	10	Qualified for knockout phase
2	Marist FC	4	3	0	1	20	5	+15	9	Qualified for knockout phase
3	Haʻamoko United	4	3	0	1	12	7	+5	9	Qualified for knockout phase
4	Longoteme	4	2	0	2	12	8	+4	6	
5	Kolofoʻou No.1	4	1	1	2	5	7	−2	4	Qualified for knockout phase
6	'Ahau	4	1	0	3	5	15	−10	3	
7	Manuka	4	0	0	4	2	24	−22	0	

NB: Apparently Kolofo'ou overtook Ha'amoko in the final unrecorded rounds to take one of the four knock out phase places.

== Knockout Phase ==
=== Semifinals ===
2 April 2011

SC Lotoha'apai	8–0	Longoteme
	Source

6 April 2011

Marist	1–0	Kolofo'ou
	Source

NB: Original semifinal match on April 2 was abandoned at 0-0 before extra time due to unknown reasons.

=== Third-place match ===
9 April 2011

Kolofo'ou	2–0	Longoteme
	Source

=== Final ===
9 April 2011

SC Lotoha'apai	2–1	Marist
Moala 28'; Uele 87'	Source	Felela 65' (pen.)

Tonga's Home of Football, 'Atele
