= 2018 Tonga Major League =

Tonga Major League
- Season: 2018
- Champions: Lotohaʻapai United

The 2018 season of the Tonga Major League is the 39th season of top flight association football competition in Tonga. The winner qualifies for the 2019 OFC Champions League Qualifying stage. Because the Tonga Major League is the only men's senior competition on Tonga there is no relegation.

Lotohaʻapai United won the title, beating Veitongo 2–1 in the final.
