= 2006–07 New Zealand Football Championship =

NZFC 2006–07
- League: New Zealand Football Championship
- Sport: Association football
- Duration: 2006–2007
- Teams: 8

NZFC season

Youth League

NZFC seasons
- ← 2005–06 2007–08 →

The 2006–07 New Zealand Football Championship was the third season of the New Zealand Football Championship and began on 14 October 2006, and finished on 16 April 2007. Auckland City FC won the title, following up their wins in 2004/2005 and 2005/2006.

== Format Revert ==
In the regular season, all teams played each other three times. The playoff stage was changed slightly (reverting to the old format used during the 2004 season), with the top three teams now going through to the playoffs (as opposed to the previous season's five).

== Team locations ==
Location of teams in the 2004–05 New Zealand Football Championship

| Club Name | Home City | Stadium |
|---|---|---|
| Auckland City FC | Auckland | Kiwitea Street |
| Canterbury United | Christchurch | English Park |
| Hawke's Bay United | Napier | Bluewater Stadium |
| Otago United | Dunedin | Sunnyvale Park |
| Team Wellington FC | Wellington | Newtown Park |
| Waikato FC | Ngaruawahia | Centennial Park |
| Waitakere United | Waitakere City | Douglas Field |
| YoungHeart Manawatu | Palmerston North | Memorial Park |

== League table ==
| Pos | Team | Pld | W | D | L | GF | GA | GD | Pts | Qualification |
|---|---|---|---|---|---|---|---|---|---|---|
| 1 | Waitakere United | 21 | 15 | 2 | 4 | 47 | 23 | +24 | 47 | Qualified for the Finals, 2007 Champions League and 2007–08 Champions League |
| 2 | YoungHeart Manawatu | 21 | 14 | 3 | 4 | 58 | 30 | +28 | 45 | Qualified for the Finals |
| 3 | Auckland City (C) | 21 | 12 | 6 | 3 | 50 | 30 | +20 | 42 | Qualified for the Finals, 2007 Champions League and 2007–08 Champions League |
| 4 | Canterbury United | 21 | 9 | 4 | 8 | 33 | 30 | +3 | 31 | |
| 5 | Team Wellington | 21 | 7 | 6 | 8 | 37 | 34 | +3 | 27 | |
| 6 | Hawke's Bay United | 21 | 4 | 4 | 13 | 29 | 49 | −20 | 16 | |
| 7 | Waikato FC | 21 | 3 | 5 | 13 | 19 | 45 | −26 | 14 | |
| 8 | Otago United | 21 | 2 | 6 | 13 | 19 | 51 | −32 | 12 | |

(C) Champions
- The regular stage winners win "Premiership" and qualify for Round 2 of the playoffs.
- The teams finished 2nd to 3rd qualify for Round 1 of the playoffs.
- Auckland City had their 1–0 victory overturned, and was stripped of three competition points, for fielding an ineligible player in the NZFC match against Waitakere United on 29 October. Their winning goal scored during the match was also forfeited as a result. Waitakere was declared winner of the match and awarded three points accordingly. Waitakere United took advantage of the ruling, and went on to qualify for the 2007 Oceania Champions League on 19 November, as the first round leader (after the opening 7 games) of the NZFC ladder.

== Finals ==
In the playoff system, the games are broken up into two rounds.

=== Bracket ===
| Elimination final | | | Grand Final |
| | | | 1 | Waitakere United | 2 |
| 2 | YoungHeart Manawatu | 1 | 3 | Auckland City | 3 |
| 3 | Auckland City | 3 |

=== Elimination Final ===
The second place team plays the third place team to make the Grand Final.

  - Elimination Final: March-25th: YoungHeart Manawatu 1–3 Auckland City FC

=== Grand Final ===
The Premiers (i.e. winners of the regular stage), receive a bye straight to the Grand Final, where they face the winners from the Elimination Final.

  - Grand Final: April-16th: Waitakere United 2–3 Auckland City FC

The champions of the 2006–07 New Zealand Football Championship and the league runners-up, will go on to represent New Zealand in the OFC Champions League 2008

== See also ==
- New Zealand Football Championship

== Notes ==
| Preceded by 2005–06 | New Zealand Football Championship; 2006-07 | Succeeded by 2007–08 |
