= 2019 Tonga Major League =

Tonga Major League
- Season: 2019
- Champions: Veitongo
- OFC Champions League: Veitongo

The 2019 season of the Tonga Major League is the 40th season of top flight association football competition in Tonga. The winner qualifies for the 2020 OFC Champions League Qualifying stage. Because the Tonga Major League is the only men's senior competition on Tonga there is no relegation. Many league games took place in front of dozens of spectators at the 1,500-capacity Loto-Tonga Soka Centre.

== Teams ==
- Fahefa
- Ha'amoko United Youth
- Lavengatonga
- Longoteme
- Lotoha'apai United
- Marist FC
- Navutoka
- Veitongo

== Stadiums ==
| Team | Location | Stadium | Capacity |
|---|---|---|---|
| Veitongo FC | Nukuʻalofa | Loto-Tonga Soka Centre | 1,500 |
| Lotoha'apai United | Nukuʻalofa | Loto-Tonga Soka Centre | 1,500 |
| Longoteme | | | |
| Lavengatonga | | | |
| Navutoka FC | | | |
| Marist Prems | | | |
| Fahefa | | | |
| Haʻamoko United Youth | | | |

== League table ==
Note: Information on goals for and against not available.

| Pos | Team | Pld | W | D | L | GD | Pts | Qualification or relegation |
|---|---|---|---|---|---|---|---|---|
| 1 | Veitongo (C, Q) | 21 | 21 | 0 | 0 | +83 | 63 | Qualification to OFC Champions League qualifying stage |
| 2 | Lotoha'apai United | 21 | 16 | 0 | 5 | +27 | 48 | |
| 3 | Longoteme | 21 | 12 | 2 | 7 | +28 | 38 | |
| 4 | Lavengatonga | 21 | 10 | 2 | 9 | +23 | 32 | |
| 5 | Navutoka | 21 | 8 | 2 | 11 | −3 | 26 | |
| 6 | Marist FC | 21 | 8 | 2 | 11 | −22 | 26 | |
| 7 | Fahefa | 21 | 2 | 3 | 16 | −78 | 9 | |
| 8 | Ha'amoko United Youth | 21 | 1 | 1 | 19 | −57 | 4 | |

Source: Tonga FA
(C) Champions; (Q) Qualified for the phase indicated
