= 2017 Tonga Major League =

Tonga Major League
- Season: 2017

The 2017 season of the Tonga Major League is the 38th season of top flight association football competition in Tonga. A total of seven teams compete in the league. The winner qualifies for the 2018 OFC Champions League Qualifying stage. Because the Tonga Major League is the only men's senior competition on Tonga there is no relegation.

The league was won by Veitongo and they qualified for the 2018 OFC Champions League.

== Clubs ==
- 'Ikale Kolomotu'a
- Ha'amoko United Youth
- Lotoha'apai United
- Marist Kauvai
- Marist Prems
- Navutoka
- Veitongo

== Standings ==
Incomplete table:

Pos	Team	Pld	W	D	L	GF	GA	GD	Pts	Qualification
1	Veitongo	3	3	0	0	10	3	+7	9	Qualification for the 2018 OFC Champions League
2	Marist Prems	4	2	1	1	13	9	+4	7	
3	Lotoha'apai United	3	2	0	1	5	1	+4	6	
4	'Ikale Kolomotu'a	3	1	1	1	6	11	−5	4	
5	Ha'amoko United	3	1	0	2	8	8	0	3	
6	Navutoka	4	1	0	3	6	11	−5	3	
7	Marist Kauvai	4	0	2	2	5	10	−5	2	

Updated to match(es) played on 25 October 2017. Source:
