= 1994 Tonga Club Championship =

Tonga Club Championship
- Season: 1994
- Champions: Navutoka FC

The 1994 season of the Tonga Club Championship was the 19th season of top flight association football competition in Tonga. Navutoka FC won the championship for the second time, with the first title in the 1989 season. Navutoka FC beat Ngeleʻia FC 1-0 in the final.
