= 1988 Tongatapu Inter Club Championship =

Tongatapu Inter Club Championship
- Season: 1988
- Champions: Ngele'ia FC

The 1988 season of the Tongatapu Inter Club Championship was the 15th season of top flight association football competition in Tonga. Ngeleʻia FC won the championship for the seventh time, their final title in a then-record of 7 consecutive championships.
