= 1974 Lion Shield =

Lion Shield
- Season: 1974
- Champions: Kolofo'ou No.1

The 1974 season of the Lion Shield was the fourth recorded season of top flight association football competition in Tonga. Kolofo'ou No.1 won the championship, their fourth successive title.
