= Football in Tonga =

- Country: Tonga
- Governing body: Tonga Football Association
- National team: men's national team

Club competitions
- Tonga Major League

International competitions
- OFC Champions League; FIFA World Cup

The sport of football in the country of Tonga is run by the Tonga Football Association. The association administers the national football team, as well as the Tonga Major League.

The Tonga national football team has had limited success internationally.
