= 2002 Tonga Major League =

Tonga Major League
- Season: 2002
- Champions: Lotoha'apai United

The 2002 season of the Tonga Major League was the 24th season of top flight association football competition in Tonga. Lotohaʻapai United won the championship for the fifth time, the 5th in a record streak of 11 titles in the Tonga Major League.

== League table ==
Pos	Team	Pld	W	D	L	GF	GA	GD	Pts
1	Lotoha'apai (C)	9	9	0	0	41	4	+37	27
2	Nautoka	9	6	2	1				20
