= 2015 Tonga Major League =

Tonga Major League
- Season: 2015
- Champions: Veitongo

The 2015 season of the Tonga Major League was the 36th season of top flight association football competition in Tonga. Veitongo FC won the championship for the third time, and first since the 1978 championship. The competitions consisted of 6 teams (only Veitongo, Kolomotu'a and Marist Prems are known) and the season start was delayed from March 21 due to 'bad weather'.
