= 1977–78 Tongan A Grade =

Tongan A Grade
- Season: 1977-78
- Champions: Veitongo FC

The 1977–78 season of the Tongan A Grade was the sixth recorded season of top flight association football competition in Tonga. Veitongo FC won the championship, their first title. The season began on December 17, 1977.

== Teams ==
- Funga'onetaka
- Kolofoʻou
- Ma'ufanga
- Ngeleʻia FC
- Toafaka'amu
- Veitongo I
- Veitongo II
