= 2013–14 Tonga Major League =

Tonga Major League
- Season: 2013-14
- Champions: Lotoha'apai United

The 2013-14 season of the Tonga Major League was the 35th season of top flight association football competition in Tonga. Lotohaʻapai United won the championship for the fifteenth time, and their fourth consecutive title. The competitions consisted of 7 teams.
