= 2000 Tonga Club Championship =

Tonga Club Championship
- Season: 2000
- Champions: Lotoha'apai United

The 2000 season of the Tonga Club Championship was the 22nd season of top flight association football competition in Tonga. Lotohaʻapai United won the championship for the third time, the 3rd in a record streak of 11 titles in the Tonga Major League.
