= 2001 Tonga Club Championship =

Tonga Club Championship
- Season: 2001
- Champions: Lotoha'apai United

The 2001 season of the Tonga Club Championship was the 23rd season of top flight association football competition in Tonga. Lotohaʻapai United won the championship for the fourth time, the 4th in a record streak of 11 titles in the Tonga Major League. The season began on June 13, 2001.
