= 1986 Tongatapu Inter Club Championship =

Tongatapu Inter Club Championship
- Season: 1986
- Champions: Ngele'ia FC

The 1986 season of the Tongatapu Inter Club Championship was the 13th season of top flight association football competition in Tonga. Ngeleʻia FC won the championship for the fifth time, their fifth title in a then-record of 7 consecutive championships.
