= 2004 Tonga Major League =

Tonga Major League
- Season: 2004
- Champions: Lotoha'apai United

The 2004 season of the Tonga Major League was the 26th season of top flight association football competition in Tonga. Lotohaʻapai United won the championship for the seventh time, the 7th in a record streak of 11 titles in the Tonga Major League.
