= 2009 Tonga Major League =

Tonga Major League
- Season: 2009
- Champions: Marist FC

The 2009 season of the Tonga Major League was the 31st season of top flight association football competition in Tonga. Marist FC won the championship for the first time, ending an 11-year championship winning streak from Lotohaʻapai United.

== Standings ==
1. Marist FC
2. Lotohaʻapai United
3. Manuka FC
4. Ngeleʻia FC
5. Ahi'o Ulakai 'Ahau FC
