= 2003 Tonga Major League =

Tonga Major League
- Season: 2003
- Champions: Lotoha'apai United

The 2003 season of the Tonga Major League was the 25th season of top flight association football competition in Tonga. Lotohaʻapai United won the championship for the sixth time, the 6th in a record streak of 11 titles in the Tonga Major League.

== Standings ==
Pos	Team	Pld	W	D	L	GF	GA	GD	Pts
1	Lotoha'apai SC (C)	9	8	1	0	40	4	+36	25
2	Ngele'ia	9	8	0	1	24	9	+15	24
3	Maufanga	9	6	1	2	20	11	+9	19
4	Nautoka	9	5	1	3	22	12	+10	16
5	Kolofo'ou	9	5	1	3	20	10	+10	16
6	Funga'onetaka	9	4	0	5	17	22	−5	12
7	Lotoha'apai Dragon	9	4	0	5	9	23	−14	12
8	Kumifonua	9	2	0	7	13	29	−16	6
9	Ahi 'o Ulakai Ahau	9	0	1	8	5	24	−19	1
10	Veitongo	9	0	1	8	7	33	−26	1

(C) Champions

== Results ==
Matches were played on a single round robin basis.

Home \ Away	AUA	FUN	KOL	KUM	LDR	LOT	MAU	NAU	NGE	VEI
Ahi 'o Ulakai Ahau										3–3
Funga'onetaka	4–1			3–2						2–1
Kolofo'ou	3–1	2–0		11–0						2–0
Kumifonua	4–1									5–1
Lotoha'apai Dragon	2–0	3–1		2–0						1–0
Lotoha'apai SC	2–0	4–0	2–0		10–1		4–2	1–1	3–0	11–0
Ma'ufanga	2–0		1–1	3–1	2–0			1–0		4–0
Nautoka	2–0		5–0	2–0	6–0					
Ngele'ia		5–2		3–1	3–0		4–3	4–1		2–0
Veitongo										

Updated to match(es) played on by end of season. Source:
Legend: Blue = home team win; Yellow = draw; Red = away team win.

NB: As season was played on a single round robin basis, results are reported as per source and should not be assumed to be genuine home or away fixtures.
Note: Round six match results are not known. It is known that Ngele'ia, Lotoha'apai SC, Kolofo'ou and Ma'ufanga all won, whilst Kumifonua, 'Ahau, Veitongo and Lotoha'apai Dragon all lost and that the winners of Nautoka vs Funga'onetaka in round 5 lost in round 6 and thelosers of that match won in round 6
