= 2007 Tonga Major League =

Tonga Major League
- Season: 2007
- Champions: Lotoha'apai United

The 2007 season of the Tonga Major League was the 29th season of top flight association football competition in Tonga. Lotohaʻapai United won the championship for the tenth time, the 10th in a record streak of 11 titles in the Tonga Major League.
