= 1999 Tonga Club Championship =

Tonga Club Championship
- Season: 1999
- Champions: Lotoha'apai United

The 1999 season of the Tonga Club Championship was the 21st season of top flight association football competition in Tonga. Lotohaʻapai United won the championship for the second time, the 2nd in a record streak of 11 titles in the Tonga Major League. Lotohaʻapai United beat Kolofoʻou FC 2-0 in the final.
