= Andy Rennie =

Andy Rennie may refer to:

- Andy Rennie (Scottish footballer) (1901–1938), Scottish footballer for Luton Town
- Andy Rennie (New Zealand footballer), former association footballer who represented New Zealand
