= 1987 Tongatapu Inter Club Championship =

Tongatapu Inter Club Championship
- Season: 1987
- Champions: Ngele'ia FC

The 1987 season of the Tongatapu Inter Club Championship was the 14th season of top flight association football competition in Tonga. Ngeleʻia FC won the championship for the sixth time, their sixth title in a then-record of 7 consecutive championships.
