= 2008 Tonga Major League =

Tonga Major League
- Season: 2008
- Champions: Lotoha'apai United

The 2008 season of the Tonga Major League was the 30th season of top flight association football competition in Tonga. Lotohaʻapai United won the championship for the eleventh time, the last championship won in a record streak of 11 titles in the Tonga Major League.
