= 1969–70 Lion Shield =

Lion Shield
- Season: 1969–70
- Champions: Kolofo'ou No.1

The 1969–70 season of the Lion Shield was the first season of top flight association football competition in Tonga. Kolofo'ou No.1 won the championship.
