= 2011–12 Tonga Major League =

Tonga Major League
- Season: 2011–12
- Champions: Lotoha'apai United

The 2011-12 season of the Tonga Major League was the 33rd season of top flight association football competition in Tonga. Lotohaʻapai United won the championship for the thirteenth time, and their second consecutive title.
