= Heinave Kaifa =

Tongan professional football manager

Personal information
- Place of birth: Tonga

Managerial career
- Years: Team
- 2002–2003: Tonga

Heinave Kaifa is a Tongan professional football manager.

== Career ==
Since 2002 until 2003 he was a head coach of the Tonga national football team.
