= 1979 Tongan A Grade =

Tongan A Grade
- Season: 1979

The 1979 season of the Tongan A Grade was the 7th season of top flight association football competition in Tonga. No champion has been recorded for this season.
