= 1970–71 Lion Shield =

Lion Shield
- Season: 1970–71
- Champions: Kolofo'ou No.1

The 1970–71 season of the Lion Shield was the second season of top flight association football competition in Tonga. Kolofo'ou No.1 won the championship, their second successive title.
