= Popua FC =

Popua
- Full name: Popua FC
- League: Tonga Major League
- 2021: 2nd
Home colours	Away colours

Popua is a football club from Tonga, currently playing in the Tonga Major League, the highest level of association football competition in Tonga.

== History ==
The first record of Popua playing in the Tongan football league system is in the 2013 season, where they finished fourth and last in the Major League Premier Division. They achieved only one point, a 0–0 draw against Marist Prems and lost their other three games, 1–6 to Marist Prems, 2–10 to Ha'amoko United Youth and 0–20 to Lotoha'apai United.
