= 1980–81 Tonga Senior Division =

Tongan A Grade
- Season: 1980-81
- Champions: 'Atenisi

The 1980–81 season of the Tongan A Grade was the 8th season of top flight association football competition in Tonga. 'Atenisi won the championship for the first time. It is unclear whether this title was for the 1980, 1980/81 or 1981 season, as the 1981 season may or may not have occurred.
