= 2006 Tonga Major League =

Tonga Major League
- Season: 2006
- Champions: Lotoha'apai United

The 2006 season of the Tonga Major League was the 28th season of top flight association football competition in Tonga. Lotohaʻapai United won the championship for the ninth time, the 9th in a record streak of 11 titles in the Tonga Major League.
