= 1989 Tongatapu Inter Club Championship =

Tongatapu Inter Club Championship
- Season: 1989
- Champions: Navutoka FC

The 1989 season of the Tongatapu Inter Club Championship was the 16th season of top flight association football competition in Tonga. Navutoka FC won the championship for the first time.
