= 2005–06 New Zealand Football Championship =

New Zealand Football Championship
- Season: 2005–06
- Champions: Auckland City
- Oceania Club Championship: Auckland City, YoungHeart Manawatu
- Matches played: 90
- Goals scored: 326 (3.62 per match)

The 2005–06 New Zealand Football Championship was the second season of the New Zealand Football Championship. The final was won by Auckland City, who defended the title they won in 2005.

== New Format ==
In the regular season, all teams played each other three times, as before. But the playoff stage was changed slightly, with the top five teams now going through to the playoffs (as opposed to the previous three).

== Team locations ==
Location of teams in the 2004–05 New Zealand Football Championship

Club Name	Home City	Stadium
Auckland City FC	Auckland	Kiwitea Street
Canterbury United	Christchurch	English Park
Hawke's Bay United	Napier	Bluewater Stadium
Otago United	Dunedin	Sunnyvale Park
Team Wellington FC	Wellington	Newtown Park
Waikato FC	Ngaruawahia	Centennial Park
Waitakere United	Waitakere City	Douglas Field
YoungHeart Manawatu	Palmerston North	Memorial Park

== League table ==
Pos	Team	Pld	W	D	L	GF	GA	GD	Pts	Qualification
1	Auckland City (C)	21	16	0	5	63	28	+35	48	Qualified for the Club Championship and Finals series
2	YoungHeart Manawatu	21	14	4	3	50	29	+21	46	Qualified for the Club Championship and Finals series
3	Canterbury United	21	13	2	6	36	22	+14	41	Qualification for Finals series
4	Team Wellington	21	8	4	9	43	53	−10	28	Qualification for Finals series
5	Otago United	21	7	6	8	27	25	+2	27	Qualification for Finals series
6	Waitakere United	21	6	4	11	38	41	−3	22	
7	Waikato FC	21	6	4	11	31	44	−13	22	
8	Hawke's Bay United	21	1	2	18	17	63	−46	5	

(C) Champions

== Finals ==
In this season's extended playoff system, the games are broken up into several rounds.

=== Bracket ===
Qualifying and elimination finals
2	YoungHeart Manawatu	0 (4)
3	Canterbury United (p)	0 (5)
4	Team Wellington (p)	2 (4)
5	Otago United	2 (1)

Semi-finals
1	Auckland City	3
3	Canterbury United	0
2	YoungHeart Manawatu	2
4	Team Wellington	3

Preliminary final
3	Canterbury United	2
4	Team Wellington	1

Grand final
1	Auckland City (p)	3 (4)
3	Canterbury United	3 (3)

=== Round 1 ===
The second place team plays the third place team in Game 1; and fourth place plays fifth place in Game 2. The second and fourth placed teams get home advantage. The winners of each game progress to Round 2, as does the loser of Game 1. The Game 2 loser is eliminated.

2 April 2006	YoungHeart Manawatu	0–0 (a.e.t.) (4–5 p)	Canterbury United

2 April 2006	Team Wellington	2–2 (a.e.t.) (4–1 p)	Otago United
	unknown 12' (o.g.); Little 102'		Scoullar 85' (pen.); Eisenhut 100'

=== Round 2 ===
Auckland City, as Premiers, receive a bye straight to Round 2 where they face the winner from Game 1. The loser of Game 1 gets a second chance by going into Round 2 to face the Game 2 winner.

  - Game 3: April-8th: Auckland City FC 3-0 Canterbury United
  - Game 4: April-9th: YoungHeart Manawatu 2-3 Team Wellington

The winner of Game 3 (Auckland) now goes into the Grand Final - and with home advantage. The loser of Game 3 (Canterbury) gets a second chance to make the Grand Final by playing the winner of Game 4 (Wellington). The Game 4 loser is eliminated.

=== Round 3 ===
  - Game 5: April-15th: Canterbury United 2-1 Team Wellington

Canterbury, as winners, go on to face Auckland City in the Grand Final.

=== Grand Final ===
  - April-22nd: Auckland City 3-3 Canterbury United (AET, Auckland won on penalties 4-3)

Auckland City are the champions of the 2005–06 New Zealand Football Championship and, along with league runners up YoungHeart Manawatu, will go on to represent New Zealand in the Oceania Club Championship 2006

== See also ==
- New Zealand Football Championship
