= 1971–72 Lion Shield =

Lion Shield
- Season: 1971–72
- Champions: Kolofo'ou No.1; Veitongo; Ngeleia

The 1971–72 season of the Lion Shield was the third season of top flight association football competition in Tonga. Kolofo'ou No.1, Veitongo and Ngeleia shared the championship after they all finished tied with 18 points after eleven games. This was Kolofo'ou's third consecutive title.
