= 2013 Tonga Major League =

Tonga Major League
- Season: 2013
- Champions: Lotoha'apai United
- Matches: 8
- Goals: 53 (6.63 per match)
- Biggest home win: Ha'amoko 10–2 Popua
- Biggest away win: Popua 0–20 Lotoha'apai
- Highest scoring: Popua 0–20 Lotoha'apai

The 2013 season of the Tonga Major League was the 34th season of top flight association football competition in Tonga. Lotohaʻapai United won the championship for the fourteenth time, and their third consecutive title.

== Teams ==
- Lotohaʻapai United
- Haʻamoko United Youth
- Marist Prems
- Popua

== Standings ==
Pos	Team	Pld	W	D	L	GF	GA	GD	Pts
1	Lotoha'apai United (C)	4	4	0	0	27	2	+25	12
2	Ha'amoko United Youth	4	2	0	2	15	9	+6	6
3	Marist Prems	4	1	1	2	8	6	+2	4
4	Popua	4	0	1	3	3	36	−33	1

== Rounds ==
=== Round 1 ===
26 February 2013

Ha'amoko United Youth	1–2	Lotoha'apai United
	Source

26 February 2013

Popua	1–6	Marist Prems
	Source

=== Round 2 ===
16 March 2013

Ha'amoko United Youth	10–2	Popua
	Source

19 March 2013

Lotoha'apai United	2–0*	Marist Prems
	Source

*Also reported 2–1

=== Round 3 ===
23 March 2013

Popua	0–20	Lotoha'apai United
	Source

23 March 2013

Marist Prems	2–3	Ha'amoko United Youth
	Source

=== Round 4 ===
6 April 2013

Marist Prems	0–0	Popua
	Source

6 April 2013

Lotoha'apai United	3–1	Ha'amoko United Youth
	Source

The remaining two rounds were cancelled and Lotoha'apai were declared champions.
