= 2016 Tonga Major League =

Tonga Major League
- Season: 2016
- Champions: Veitongo

The 2016 season of the Tonga Major League was the 37th season of top flight association football competition in Tonga. Veitongo FC won the championship for the fourth time, and the second time in a row. Details on the season are minimal, but it appears that the competition with decided with a final round in which Veitongo defeated Marist 8–2.
