= 2005 Tonga Major League =

Tonga Major League
- Season: 2005
- Champions: Lotoha'apai United

The 2005 season of the Tonga Major League was the 27th season of top flight association football competition in Tonga. Lotohaʻapai United won the championship for the eighth time, the 8th in a record streak of 11 titles in the Tonga Major League.
