= Ludwig Peka =

Papua New Guinean football manager

Personal information
- Place of birth: Papua New Guinea

Managerial career
- Years: Team
- 2003–2004: Papua New Guinea

Ludwig Peka is a Papua New Guinean professional football manager. Since 2003 until 2004 he coached the Papua New Guinea national football team.
