= Yap Soccer Association =

OFC
- Founded: 1983
- Headquarters: Yap
- OFC affiliation: ?
- NF-Board affiliation: 2007
- President: Peter Tairuwepiy

The Yap Soccer Association is the governing body of football (soccer) in the Federated States of Micronesia, consisting of the island of Yap. It organises the Yap football team.

== See also ==
- Federated States of Micronesia Football Association
