= Edward Ngara =

Solomon Islands football manager

Personal information
- Place of birth: Solomon Islands

Managerial career
- Years: Team
- 1995–1996: Solomon Islands

Edward Ngara is a Solomon Islands professional football manager.

== Career ==
Since 1995 until 1996 he coached the Solomon Islands national football team.
