= Umberto Mottini =

Tahitian football manager

Personal information
- Date of birth: 21 June 1937 (age 89)
- Place of birth: Novara, Italy

Managerial career
- Years: Team
- 1996: Tahiti
- 1997–1998: Tonga

Umberto Mottini is an Italian professional football manager.

With footballing ties to Oceania, he is known for having managed the men's national football teams of Tahiti and Tonga in the 1990s.

== Biography ==
Owner of an appliance store and a director at roller Hockey Novara, at the age of 51 he suddenly disappeared from Novara, due to financial and family problems.

Mottini arrived in Tonga on 24 February 1989, where he opened an Italian restaurant in the capital, Nuku'alofa. About a year later, he was tracked down by a journalist from La Stampa, and subsequently RAI produced a television report on his story, which was broadcast on the TV7 news programme.

He later moved to Lautoka, in Fiji.

== Career ==
After arriving in Tonga, he began coaching a youth football team, with excellent results. Before long, he was appointed to coach the university team 'Atenisi United and also the Tongan national team, becoming friends with King Tāufaʻāhau Tupou IV.

Between 1995 and 1996, Mottini served as head coach of the Tahiti national football team. In November 1995, he led Tahiti to the semi-finals of the 1996 OFC Nations Cup against the Solomon Islands, winning 1–0 away from home. On 11 May 1996, in Papeete, the Tahitian side won again, 2–1, securing their place in the final stage of the competition.

In February 1997, Mottini was appointed head coach of the Tonga national football team for the 1998 World Cup qualification. On 1st March 1997, he led Tonga in the second play-off match of the first round against the Solomon Islands, played in Honiara, which ended in a 9–0 defeat.
