= Tonga Cup =

The Tonga Cup is Tonga's men's football domestic cup held annually. The current titleholders are Ngeleʻia FC.

== Previous winners ==
They are:

- 1981: Ngele'ia
- 1982: Ngele'ia
- 1983: Ngele'ia
- 1984: Veitongo
- 1985: Ngele'ia
- 1986: Ngele'ia
- 1987: Ngele'ia
- 1988: Ngele'ia
- 1989–93: Not held
- 1994: Navutoka
- 1995–97: Not held
- 1998: Veitongo
- 1999–2001: Not held
- 2002: Ngele'ia
- 2003: Ngele'ia
- 2004–08: Not held
- 2009–10: Unknown
- 2011: Marist Prems
- 2012–19: Unknown
- 2020: Veitongo
- 2021: Not held
- 2022: Not held
- 2023: Not held
- 2024: Not held
- 2025: Nukuhetulu
