= Andy Rennie (New Zealand footballer) =

New Zealand footballer

Personal information
- Full name: Andrew Rennie
- Place of birth: New Zealand

International career
Years	Team	Apps	(Gls)
1995–1997	New Zealand	13	(1)

Andrew Rennie is a former association football player who represented New Zealand at international level.

Rennie scored on his full All Whites debut, a 1–3 loss to Chile on 18 June 1995 and ended his international playing career with 13 A-international caps and 1 goal, his final cap an appearance in a 0–3 loss to Norway on 22 January 1997.
