= Haʻamoko United Youth =

Ha'amoko United Youth
- Full name: Ha'amoko United Youth
- Manager: Koliniasi Vakatapu
- League: Tonga Major League
- 2017: 2nd
Home colours	Away colours

Ha'amoko United Youth is a football club from Tonga, currently playing in the Tonga Major League, the highest level of association football competition in Tonga.

== History ==
The first record of Ha'amoko playing in the Tongan football league system is in 2010. Their final position is not known but, whilst they were in third position after four matches, they did not make it through to the play off rounds at the end of the season and so presumably finished fifth or lower. In the 2013 season, they were one of only four teams to take part, this time finishing in runners-up spot to Lotoha'apai United, winning two of their four games and losing two, both to Lotoha'apai.

== Honours ==
- Tonga Major League:

Runners-up: 2013
