= Manawatu United =

- Full name: Manawatu United
- Nickname: YoungHeart
- Founded: 2004
- Dissolved: 2015
- Ground: Memorial Park; Palmerston North, New Zealand
- Capacity: 8,000
- Chairman: Paul Barris
- League: ASB Youth League
Home colours	Away colours

Manawatu United (previously known as YoungHeart Manawatu) was a football club based in Palmerston North, New Zealand. It participated in the New Zealand Football Championship, and fielded a youth side in the National Youth League. Their home ground was Memorial Park.

In 2014, the team was renamed to Manawatu United.

== History ==
Chart of yearly ladder positions for YoungHeart Manawatu

Manawatu United was formed in 2004, under the name YoungHeart Manawatu, to compete in the New Zealand Football Championship (NZFC). Based in Palmerston North, they were the sole franchise in the region. In the inaugural NZFC season (2004–2005), Manawatu United finished bottom of the league. However, in 2005–2006 they finished runner-up to champions Auckland City FC at the end of the regular season. In the finals, United lost both their playoff matches and exited early. The 2006–07 season saw Manawatu United finish second again at the conclusion of the regular season, this time behind Waitakere United. United lost their preliminary final to Auckland and missed out on a spot in the O-League as a result. 2007–08 was somewhat disappointing campaign, given the success of the previous two seasons. Manawatu United finished the regular season placed sixth on the table, well adrift of the playoffs.

A return to the playoffs came in the 2008–09 season, as United finished in third place in the condensed regular season. What followed was an emphatic two-goal victory in the first leg of a semi-final against Auckland City. In the return leg Auckland used their home advantage equally as well to win by 3–0. In 2009–10 the side finished sixth. During the 2010 off-season, youth prospect Cory Chettleburgh signed for Dutch club Sparta Rotterdam. This was a significant loss for the side as they looked to bounce back from a fairly disappointing campaign. At the conclusion of the 2012–13 season the franchise didn't have their league license renewed and were replaced by a New Zealand under-20 squad Wanderers Special Club for the 2013–14 season. Due to the ASB Youth League being reduced to 10 teams, Manawatu United dissolved the youth team as well, at the end of the 2015 ASB Youth League season.

== Ground ==
Memorial Park was the home ground of Manawatu United. They had played at this ground since the 2008–09 season, having previously played their home fixtures at Central Energy Trust Arena.

== Coaching list ==
- (New Zealand) Shane Rufer (July 2006 – June 2008)
- (New Zealand) Bob Sova (July 2008 – June 2011)
- (New Zealand) Stu Jacobs (July 2011–2015)

== Performance in OFC competitions ==
- Oceania Club Championship: (1 appearance)

2006 – 3rd place – Won against Nokia Eagles (Fiji) 4 – 0 (stage 4 of 4)

Season	Competition	Round	Club	Home	Away	Position
2006	OFC Club Championship	Group B	(Fiji) Nokia Eagles	2–2		1st
2006	OFC Club Championship	Group B	(New Caledonia) Magenta	3–0		1st
2006	OFC Club Championship	Group B	(Vanuatu) Tafea	1–0		1st
2006	OFC Club Championship	Semi-finals	(French Polynesia) Pirae	1–2		
2006	OFC Club Championship	Third place play-off	(Fiji) Nokia Eagles	4–0		
