= Kolofoʻou No.1 =

Kolofo'ou No.1
- Full name: Kolofo'ou No.1
- League: Tonga Major League
- 2010–11: 3rd
Home colours	Away colours

Kolofo'ou No.1 is a football club from Tonga, and played in the Tonga Major League, the highest level of association football competition in Tonga. They were the most successful team in Tonga in the 1970s, winning three consecutive national titles. Their last recorded participation in the Tonga Major League was in 2010.

== History ==
Kolofo'ou won the first three recorded league titles in 1969–70, 1970–71 and 1971–72, sharing the third title with Ngele'ia and Veitongo when all three teams finished with 18 points from their eleven games.

Records are either patchy or non-existent for the years 1972–1984 and it is not known how Kolofo'ou performed, or even if they competed. In 1984 they finished sixth out of fourteen teams on sixteen points, three points above Paionia and three below Munaio, winning six and drawing four of their thirteen games. They performed worse the following season, finishing in eleventh place, above 'Atenisi United and Sparkles 85 on goal difference, but one point behind Halafualeva, winning three and drawing none of their thirteen games.

Records are again lacking or incomplete, through to 2003 and whilst it is known that Kolofo'ou continued to compete (as they lost in the final of the 1998 Inter-club Knockout Championship to Lotoha'apai), the next recorded appearance of the club in the Tonga Major League is in the 2003 season, when they finished fifth out of ten teams, below Navutoka on goal difference and four points above Funga'onetaka, winning five and drawing one of their nine games.

They were still competing in 2009 and although their league position is not known, they are known to have been competing in the Tonga Cup. The most recent season for which records exist for their participation is 2010–11 where they finished third, losing 1–0 to Marist in the semi-final of the play-off rounds at the end of the regular season, before beating Longoteme 2–0 in the third place play-off.

== Honours ==
- Tonga Major League:

Winners: 1969–70, 1970–71, 1971–72
Runners-up: 1999
Third place: 2010–11
