= Marist Prems =

- Full name: Marist Prems
- League: Tonga Major League
- 2023: 7th
Home colours	Away colours

Marist Prems is a football club located in Nukuʻalofa, Tonga, currently playing in the Tonga Major League, the highest level of association football competition in Tonga.

== History ==
The first record of Marist playing in the Tongan football league system is in 2006. Their final position is not known but, it is known that they beat the champions SC Lotoha'apai 4–0 in the final round of matches. Their most successful season to date was their championship win in 2009, where they ended Lotoha'apai's eleven year hold on the title, beating them into second place, with Manuka finishing third. they were unbeaten in the season in the first eight rounds of matches, finally losing 1–3 to Ngele'ia. In the 2013 season, they were one of only four teams to take part, this time finishing in third place, with Lotoha'apai United finishing first and Ha'amoko United Youth finishing second. They won one of their four games, a 6–1 victory over Popua on the opening day of the season, drew the return fixture 0–0, but lost 0–2 to Lotoha'apai and 2–3 to Ha'amoko.

== Honours ==
- Tonga Major League:

Winner: 2009

- Tonga Cup:

2011
