= Tonga Major League =

- Founded: 1969
- Country: Tonga
- Confederation: OFC
- Number of clubs: 7
- Level on pyramid: 1
- Relegation to: Tonga Division I
- Domestic cup: Tonga Cup
- International cup: OFC Champions League
- Current champions: Nukuhetulu FC (1st title) (2025)
- Most championships: Lotoha'apai United (16 titles)
- Current: 2026 Tonga Major League

The Tonga Major League is the top association football league in Tonga, operating under the auspices of the Tonga Football Association. There is promotion and relegation between the Major League and second-tier Tonga Division I.

== Format ==
Typically, seven or eight clubs compete in the league with each club playing all others three times. The winner's are eligible to enter the OFC Champions League while the lowest-ranked clubs are relegated to the Tonga Division I.

== Clubs ==
The following clubs compete in the league for the 2026 season.

- Folaha
- Lavengatonga
- Longoteme
- Lotohaʻapai United
- Navutoka
- Nukuhetulu
- Veitongo

== Winners ==
SC Lotoha'apai is the league's most successful club, winning a total of sixteen times, including eleven seasons in a row from 1998 to 2009.

| Ed. | Season | Champion |
|---|---|---|
| 1 | 1969–70 | Kolofo'ou No.1 |
| 2 | 1970–71 | Kolofo'ou No.1 |
| 3 | 1971–72 | Kolofo'ou No.1, Veitongo, Ngeleia |
| 4-5 | 1972–73 | Unknown |
| 6 | 1974 | Kolofo'ou |
| 7 | 1975 | Kolofo'ou |
| 8-9 | 1976–77 | Unknown |
| 10 | 1977–78 | Veitongo |
| 11 | 1979 | Unknown |
| 12 | 1980–81 | 'Atenisi United |
| 13 | 1982 | Ngeleia |
| 14 | 1983 | Ngeleia |
| 15 | 1984 | Ngeleia |
| 16 | 1985 | Ngeleia |
| 17 | 1986 | Ngeleia |
| 18 | 1987 | Ngeleia |
| 19 | 1988 | Ngeleia |
| 20 | 1989 | Navutoka FC |
| 21 | 1990 | Ngeleia |
| 22-24 | 1991–93 | Unknown |
| 25 | 1994 | Navutoka FC |
| 26-28 | 1995–97 | Unknown |
| 29 | 1998 | SC Lotoha'apai |
| 30 | 1999 | SC Lotoha'apai |
| 31 | 2000 | SC Lotoha'apai |
| 32 | 2001 | SC Lotoha'apai |
| 33 | 2002 | SC Lotoha'apai |
| 34 | 2003 | SC Lotoha'apai |
| 35 | 2004 | SC Lotoha'apai |
| 36 | 2005 | SC Lotoha'apai |
| 37 | 2006 | SC Lotoha'apai |
| 38 | 2007 | SC Lotoha'apai |
| 39 | 2008 | SC Lotoha'apai |
| 40 | 2009 | Marist Prems |
| — | 2010 | Not played |
| 41 | 2010–11 | SC Lotoha'apai |
| 42 | 2011–12 | SC Lotoha'apai |
| 43 | 2013 | Lotoha'apai United |
| 44 | 2013–14 | SC Lotoha'apai |
| 45 | 2015 | Veitongo |
| 46 | 2016 | Veitongo |
| 47 | 2017 | Veitongo |
| 48 | 2018 | Lotoha'apai United |
| 49 | 2019 | Veitongo |
| — | 2020 | Not played |
| 50 | 2021 | Veitongo |
| 51 | 2022 | Veitongo |
| 52 | 2023 | Veitongo |
| — | 2024 | Not played |
| 53 | 2025 | Nukuhetulu |
| 54 | 2026 | |

== Top goalscorers ==
| Season | Player | Team | Goals | Ref. |
|---|---|---|---|---|
| 2019 | (Tonga) Hemaloto Polovili | Veitongo | | |
| 2023 | (Fiji) Lui Muavesi | Navutoka | 18 | |
