= Tonga Football Association =

Governing body of football in Tonga

OFC
- Short name: TFA
- Founded: 1965
- Headquarters: Loto-Tonga Soka Centre
- FIFA affiliation: 1994
- OFC affiliation: 1994
- President: Ve'ehala
- Vice-President: Paul Ma'u
- Website: tongafootball.to

The Tonga Football Association (TFA) is the governing body of football in Tonga. It oversees the Tonga national football team and various age-group national teams, as well as Tonga Major League and the Tonga Cup in international and club football respectively. Tonga is a full member of FIFA and OFC and participates in major tournaments like FIFA World Cup Qualifiers and OFC Nations Cup.
