= Ngeleʻia FC =

- Full name: Ngele'ia Football Club
- League: Tonga Major League
- 2009: 4th
Home colours	Away colours

Ngeleʻia FC is a Tongan football club located in Kolofo'ou, Tonga. It played in the Lion Shield, the top level of football competition in Tonga, from at least 1971 until 2009, (although fragmentary records do not indicate whether they played every season between these dates) winning four outright titles and one shared title in the seventies and eighties. They are the second most successful team in Tonga in terms of top-flight league titles after Lotohaʻapai SC and also the most successful team in the Tonga Cup, the premier knockout competition in Tongan football, winning nine of the twelve known competitions.

== History ==
=== 1970s ===
Ngeleʻla's first recorded appearance in Tongan football was in the 1971-72 Lion Shield, the premier football tournament in Tonga, now known as the Tonga Major League. They shared the league title that season with Kolofoʻou No.1 and Veitongo when all three teams finished on 18 points after eleven games.

=== 1980s ===
Results of competition are not known for the next nine years, but it is known that Ngeleʻla dominated Tongan football in the first half of the 1980s winning four straight titles in 1982, 1983, 1984 and 1985. Details for the 1982 and 1983 seasons are not known, but it is known that they finished top of the league, then known as the Tongatapu Inter Club Championship, unbeaten, winning all thirteen of their matches and finishing six points clear of runners-up Navutoka.^{,} The following season was even more successful for the club. Again they finished the season unbeaten, winning all thirteen games in a row again, and were now unbeaten in 26 matches, again finishing in first place ahead of Navutoka, but this time by only three points. In addition to another unbeaten season, they also won the Tonga Cup, beating Houmakelikao. In addition to their league success, they also won the Tonga Cup every year between 1981 and 1988 inclusive bar 1984 which was won by Veitongo.

=== 1990s ===
Information on football in Tonga in the 1990s is patchy, but sources indicate that Ngeleʻia were runners up in the Coca-Cola Trophy in 1994, losing 0–1 to Navutoka, with Uame Tolutaʻu scoring for Navutoka in the eightieth minute. Sources describe this as the most prestigious competition in Tonga, but it does not appear that this is counted as an official national championship.

=== 2000s ===
Records show that they won a knock out competition in 2002, beating Maʻufanga in the final, which appears to have been the national cup competition. The following season, they were runners-up in the 2003 Tonga Major League, finishing one point behind Lotohaʻapai SC, losing 0–3 to them on the final day of the season to present them with the title. There was however, some consolation as they retained their Tonga Cup title, the last cup competition that would be held until 2009. The final record of Ngeleʻia competing in the Tongan Major League is in 2009, where they finished fourth behind winners Marist, runners up Lotohaʻapai SC and third-place finishers Manuka.

== Honours ==
- Tonga Major League:
  - Winners (5): 1971–72, 1982, 1983, 1984, 1985
  - Runners up (1): 2003
- Tonga Cup
  - Winners (9): 1981, 1982, 1983, 1985, 1986, 1987, 1988, 2002, 2003

== Current squad ==
As of 2013 season:

Note: Flags indicate national team as defined under FIFA eligibility rules; some limited exceptions apply. Players may hold more than one non-FIFA nationality.

No.	Pos.	Nation	Player
1	FW	(Tonga) TGA	Viliami Vaitaki
