= Navutoka FC =

- Full name: Navutoka Football Club
- Manager: Lui Muavesi
- League: Tonga Major League
- 2023: 2nd
Home colours	Away colours

Navutoka is a football club from Tonga, currently playing in the Tonga Major League, the highest level of association football competition in Tonga.

== History ==
The first record of Navutoka playing in the Tongan football league system is in 1975. They reached the second place out of eight participants. They returned not earlier than the 1983 season. From this time they were a regular participant in the Tonga Major League. In 1989 and 1994 they won the league. The 1994 win would be the last win for another club than Lotohaʻapai United. From 1998 until 2008 they won all the titles. Navutoka have never played in the Oceania Club Championship because in the years that they became champions the competition was not held.

== Current squad ==
Squad for the 2019 Tonga Major League

Note: Flags indicate national team as defined under FIFA eligibility rules; some limited exceptions apply. Players may hold more than one non-FIFA nationality.

No.	Pos.	Nation	Player
—	DF	(Tonga) TGA	Nicolas Vea
—	DF	(Tonga) TGA	Petuli Tokotaha
—	DF	(Fiji) FIJ	Lui Muavesi
—	MF	(Tonga) TGA	Sione Tovo

No.	Pos.	Nation	Player
—	MF	(Tonga) TGA	Pio Palu
—	FW	(Tonga) TGA	Penieli Moa
—	FW	(Tonga) TGA	Tuloi Maamaloa

== Honours ==
- Tonga Major League:2

Winners 1989, 1994
