= Veitongo FC =

Tongan Football club

Veitongo F.C.
- Full name: Veitongo Football Club
- Ground: Loto-Tonga Soka Centre
- Capacity: 1,500
- Manager: Timote Moleni
- League: Tonga Major League
- 2023: Champions
| Home colours | Away colours |

Veitongo Football Club is a football club from Tonga, currently playing in the Tonga Major League, the highest level of association football competition in Tonga.

In 2016 the team reached the qualifying stage of the OFC Champions League, but lost all three qualifying matches. They reached the qualifying stage again in 2017, but failed to qualify after drawing with Lupe o le Soaga. They again reached the qualifying stage of the OFC Champions League in 2020, but failed to qualify after drawing with Tupapa Maraerenga.

== Honours ==
- Tonga Major League (9): 1971–72, 1978, 2015, 2016, 2017, 2019, 2021, 2022, 2023
- Tonga Challenge Cup (1): 2020

== Continental record ==
| Season | Competition | Round | Club | Home | Away | Aggregate |
|---|---|---|---|---|---|---|
| 2016 | OFC Champions League | PR | (Cook Islands) Tupapa Maraerenga | 0–7 | | 4th |
| 2016 | OFC Champions League | PR | (American Samoa) Utulei Youth | 2–3 | | 4th |
| 2016 | OFC Champions League | PR | (Samoa) Kiwi | 1–7 | | 4th |
| 2017 | OFC Champions League | PR | (Cook Islands) Puaikura | 0–4 | | 3rd |
| 2017 | OFC Champions League | PR | (American Samoa) Utulei Youth | 3–1 | | 3rd |
| 2017 | OFC Champions League | PR | (Samoa) Lupe o le Soaga | 1–1 | | 3rd |
| 2018 | OFC Champions League | PR | (American Samoa) Pago Youth | 1–1 | | 3rd |
| 2018 | OFC Champions League | PR | (Cook Islands) Tupapa Maraerenga | 2–9 | | 3rd |
| 2018 | OFC Champions League | PR | (Samoa) Lupe o le Soaga | 0–6 | | 3rd |
| 2020 | OFC Champions League | PR | (Samoa) Lupe o le Soaga | 0–2 | | 3rd |
| 2020 | OFC Champions League | PR | (Cook Islands) Tupapa Maraerenga | 2–2 | | 3rd |
| 2023 | OFC Champions League | PR | (Cook Islands) Tupapa Maraerenga | 0–1 | | 3rd |
| 2023 | OFC Champions League | PR | (Samoa) Lupe o le Soaga | 0–9 | | 3rd |
| 2023 | OFC Champions League | PR | (American Samoa) Ilaoa and To'omata | —N/a | | 3rd |
| 2024 | OFC Champions League | PR | (American Samoa) Vaiala Tongan | 13–0 | | 3rd |
| 2024 | OFC Champions League | PR | (Samoa) Vaivase-Tai | 0–0 | | 3rd |
| 2024 | OFC Champions League | PR | (Cook Islands) Tupapa Maraerenga | 2–3 | | 3rd |

=== Top goalscorers in Champions League ===
- (Tonga) Hemaloto Polovili (5)
- (Tonga) Elias Kendler (5)
- (Tonga) Vai Lutu (4)
- (Tonga) Sione Uhatahi (4)
- (Tonga) Lisiate Feke (2)
- (Tonga) Lafaele Moala (2)
- (Tonga) Kilifi Uele (2)
- (Tonga) Halapua Falepapalangi (1)
- (Tonga) Pita Uhatahi (1)
- (Tonga) Amoni Fifita (1)

== Current technical staff ==
| Position | |
|---|---|
| Head coach | (Tonga) Mark Uhatahi |
| Assistant coach | (Tonga) Kilifi Uele |
| Team Manager | (Tonga) Fetu'u Vea |
| Doctor | (Tonga) Sosaia Faupula |

== Current squad ==
Squad for the 2024 OFC Champions League qualifying stage

Note: Flags indicate national team as defined under FIFA eligibility rules; some limited exceptions apply. Players may hold more than one non-FIFA nationality.

| No. | Pos. | Nation | Player |
|---|---|---|---|
| 1 | GK | TGA | Semesi Otukolo |
| 2 | DF | TGA | Tevita Koloa |
| 3 | DF | TGA | Sione Tuifangaloka |
| 4 | DF | TGA | Sione Uhatahi |
| 5 | MF | TGA | Pita Uhatahi |
| 6 | FW | TGA | Lisiate Feke |
| 7 | MF | TGA | Kamaliele Papani |
| 8 | MF | TGA | Vai Lutu (captain) |
| 9 | FW | TGA | Elias Kendler |

| No. | Pos. | Nation | Player |
|---|---|---|---|
| 10 | FW | TGA | Hemaloto Polovili |
| 11 | MF | TGA | Tuia Falepapalangi |
| 12 | MF | TGA | Christopher Kefu |
| 13 | FW | TGA | Kulisitofa Kite |
| 14 | MF | TGA | Tau'aika Sonasi |
| 15 | DF | TGA | Opesi Tuifangaloka |
| 16 | DF | TGA | Laulea Taufa |
| 17 | FW | TGA | Amoni Fifita |
| 20 | GK | TGA | Nimilote Moala |
