= Lotohaʻapai United =

- Full name: Lotohaʻapai United
- Nickname: United
- Founded: 1970
- Ground: Loto-Tonga Soka Centre
- Capacity: 1,500
- Manager: Fetu'u He Vahafolau Vea
- League: Tonga Major League
- 2021: 4th
Home colours	Away colours

Lotohaʻapai United (formerly SC Lotohaʻapai) is a Tongan football club located in Veitongo, Tonga. It currently plays in Tonga Major League. The team is record champion of the league and made its continental debut in the 1999 Oceania Club Championship preliminary round.

== Titles ==
- Tonga Major League
  - Champions (16): 1998, 1999, 2000, 2001, 2002, 2003, 2004, 2005, 2006, 2007, 2008, 2011, 2012, 2013, 2014, 2018

== Current squad ==
Note: Flags indicate national team as defined under FIFA eligibility rules; some limited exceptions apply. Players may hold more than one non-FIFA nationality.

No.	Pos.	Nation	Player
1	GK	TGA	Sinilau Taufa
2	DF	TGA	Siosifa Moimoi
3	DF	TGA	Sione Uhatahi
4	DF	TGA	Oliveti Vai
5	DF	TGA	Laulea Taufa
6	MF	TGA	Pua Falepapalangi
7	MF	TGA	Tuia Falepapalangi
8	MF	TGA	Maliele Papani
9	MF	TGA	Soakai Vea

No.	Pos.	Nation	Player
10	FW	TGA	Hemaloto Polovili
11	GK	TGA	Semisi Otukolo
12	MF	TGA	Vai Lutu
13	DF	TGA	Folauhola Mesui
14	FW	TGA	Pita Huni
15	MF	TGA	Manu Tuʻalau
16	MF	TGA	Sitaleki Fisi
17	FW	BRA	Susyno
65	GK	TGA	David Anau

== Former players ==
- (Spain) Alexandre Casillas
- (Spain) Oscar Garcia

== Continental competition ==
Season	Competition	Round	Club	Home	Away
1999	OFC Club Championship	Group C	(Vanuatu) Tafea F.C.	0–10	
1999	OFC Club Championship	Group C	(New Zealand) Central United F.C.	0–16	
2001	OFC Club Championship	Group A	(Australia) Wollongong Wolves	0–16	
2001	OFC Club Championship	Group A	(Papua New Guinea) Unitech FC	2–5	
2001	OFC Club Championship	Group A	(New Zealand) Napier City Rovers FC	0–9	
2001	OFC Club Championship	Group A	(Solomon Islands) Laugu United FC	0–7	
2001	OFC Club Championship	Group A	(Fiji) Foodtown Warriors Labasa	2–5	
2005	OFC Club Championship	Preliminary stage	(Vanuatu) Tafea F.C.	1–2	0–5
2006	OFC Club Championship	Preliminary stage	(Fiji) Nokia Eagles	1–5	
2006	OFC Club Championship	Preliminary stage	(Cook Islands) Nikao Sokattack FC	3–1	
2006	OFC Club Championship	Preliminary stage	(Samoa) Tuanaimato Breeze	1–1	
2012–13	OFC Champions League	Preliminary stage	(Cook Islands) Tupapa Maraerenga	3–3	
2012–13	OFC Champions League	Preliminary stage	(American Samoa) Pago Youth	6–0	
2012–13	OFC Champions League	Preliminary stage	(Samoa) Kiwi FC	2–1	
2013–14	OFC Champions League	Preliminary stage	(Cook Islands) Tupapa Maraerenga	0–3	
2013–14	OFC Champions League	Preliminary stage	(Samoa) Kiwi FC	2–4	
2014–15	OFC Champions League	Preliminary stage	(Samoa) Lupe o le Soaga	0–1	
2014–15	OFC Champions League	Preliminary stage	(American Samoa) SKBC	4–1	
2014–15	OFC Champions League	Preliminary stage	(Cook Islands) Puaikura	0–1	
2019	OFC Champions League	Preliminary stage	(American Samoa) Pago Youth	5–1	
2019	OFC Champions League	Preliminary stage	(Cook Islands) Tupapa Maraerenga	1–4	
2019	OFC Champions League	Preliminary stage	(Samoa) Kiwi FC	1–9	

=== OFC Champions League top scorers ===
Season	Player	Goals
1999	–	
2001	Teu Farava	1
2001	Amone Leona	1
2001	Siua Maamola	1
2001	Felise Tahitua	1
2005	Unknown	
2006	Maʻake Uhatahi	2
2012–13	Mark Uhatahi	4
2012–13	Timote Maamaaloa	4
2014–15	Mark Uhatahi	2
2019	Tuia Falepapalangi	3

- No goalscorers for 1999 and 2005 are missing.
