= List of New Zealand women's international footballers =

This is a list of New Zealand women's international footballers – association football players who have played for the New Zealand women's national football team in officially recognised international matches. All players with official senior caps are listed here.

== Key ==
Caps	Appearances
WC	Member of squad at FIFA Women's World Cups
Oly	Member of squad at Olympic Games
U-20	Member of squad at FIFA U-20 Women's World Cups
U-17	Member of squad at FIFA U-17 Women's World Cups

== List of players ==
This table takes into account all New Zealand A-international matches played up to and including 13 February 2024 after the game against Vanuatu.

Player	Caps	Goals	First Cap	Latest Cap	Debùt vs	WC	Oly	U-20	U-17
Amelia Abbott	1	0	2021	2021	Canada				
Rosie Ah Wong	7	1	1979	1982	Australia				
Abby Allan	6	0	1994	1995	Bulgaria				
Pernille Andersen	7	15	1998	1998	Germany				
Maria Anderton	4	1	1993	1994	Trinidad and Tobago				
Elizabeth Anton	20	0	2017	2024	Thailand	2023	2020	2016 2018	2016
Bridgette Armstrong	3	1	2009	2010	Japan			2008 2010 2012	2008
Adrienne Bain	1	0	1995	1995	South Korea				
Donna Baker	35	11	1983	1995	Australia	1991			
Mackenzie Barry	12	0	2022	2024	Japan				2018
Jenny Bindon	77	0	2004	2013	Australia	2007 2011	2008 2012		
Hannah Blake	6	0	2017	2022	Thailand			20162018	2016
Catherine Bott	42	3	2014	2023	South Korea	2015 2019 2023	2020	2014	2012
Katie Bowen	103	3	2011	2024	Australia	20112015 2019 2023	2016 2020	2012	2008 2010
Hannah Bromley	7	0	2005	2012	Japan	2007		2006	
Claudia Bunge	26	0	2019	2024	China	2023	2020	2018	2016
Caitlin Campbell	5	1	2006	2009	China			2006 2008	2008
Julia Campbell	30	9	1987	1995	United States	1991			
Jennifer Carlisle	5	1	1997	1998	China				
Terri-Amber Carlson	2	0	2011	2011	Switzerland				
Simone Carmichael	25	7	2000	2008	Canada	2007		2010	
Olivia Chance	47	2	2011	2023	Netherlands	2019 2023	2020	2012	2010
Cinnamon Chaney	29	2	1987	1995	United States	1991			
Vicki Chong	1	0	1994	1994	Russia				
Aroon Clansey	5	0	2006	2011	China	2011		2006	
Sara Clapham	3	0	2004	2004	Australia				
Beth Clark	1	0	1996	1996	Papua New Guinea				
Michele Clarke	13	2	2003	2007	Samoa				
Naomi Clarke	3	0	2004	2004	Australia				
Milly Clegg	6	0	2023	2023	Iceland	2023		2022	2022
Daisy Cleverley	35	2	2014	2024	Tonga	2015 2019 2023	2020	20142016	20122014
Zarnia Cogle	18	0	2000	2004	Canada				
Ava Collins	15	0	2021	2024	Canada			2022	
Helen Collins	28	6	2013	2015	Scotland			2006	
Marie-Jose Cooper	1 (Note: Some sources list Cooper with 5 caps)	0	1979	1979	Australia				
Barbara Cox	30	0	1975	1987	Hong Kong				
Michele Cox	20	9	1987	1998	United States				
Tara Cox	4	0	2000	2000	Japan				
Amanda Crawford	40	10	1989	2000	Chinese Taipei	1991			
Robyn Davies-Patrick	4	0	1994	1996	Bulgaria				
Michelle de Bruyn	2	0	1984	1984	Chinese Taipei				
Kim Dermott	11	2	1993	1996	United States				
Rachel Doody	2	0	2003	2003	Cook Islands				
Tracey Duke	2	0	1994	1994	Bulgaria				
Katie Duncan	124	1	2006	2019	China	2007 20112015 2019	2008 20122016	2006 2008	
Priscilla Duncan	20	1	2003	2007	Australia	2007			
Brianna Edwards	1	0	2024	2024	Tonga				
Melanie Edwards	2	0	2003	2003	Samoa				
Nadene Elrick	4	0	1975	1975	Hong Kong				
Abby Erceg	146	6	2006	2022	China	2007 20112015 2019	2008 20122016 2020	2006 2008	
Victoria Esson	21	0	2017	2024	Thailand	2019 2023	2020		2008
Joanne Evans	3	0	1998	1998	Samoa				
Tina Faichnie	1	0	1979	1979	Australia				
Jo Fisher	11	4	1982	1991	Chinese Taipei				
Michaela Foster	13	1	2023	2024	Argentina	2023		2018	2016
Macey Fraser	3	2	2024	2024	Tonga				
Rowena Fulham	6	2	1981	1982	Australia				
Maria George	4	0	1982	1991	Chinese Taipei	1991			
Sarah Gibbs	4	0	2004	2004	Australia				
Jill Gilmore	17	0	1993	2000	Trinidad and Tobago				
Alison Grant	32	10	1980	1989	Australia				
Ally Green	10	2	2022	2024	Wales				
Anna Green	82	8	2006	2023	China	201120152019	2008 20122016 2020	2008 2010	
Sarah Gregorius	100	34	2010	2020	Vanuatu	20112015 2019	20122016	2006	
Sue Gregory	7	0	1993	1996	Trinidad and Tobago				
Angela Hall	13	0	1980	1984	Australia				
Ingrid Hall	15	1	1979	1983	Australia				
Kathy Hall	14	3	1975	1986	Hong Kong				
Raewyn Hall	4	0	1975	1975	Hong Kong				
Jacqui Hand	21	4	2021	2024	Canada	2023		2016 2018	2016
Julie Harvey	4	0	1981	1982	Switzerland				
Sacha Haskell	16	8	1994	1998	Bulgaria				
Betsy Hassett	155	16	2008	2024	Argentina	20112015 2019 2023	20122016 2020	2008 2010	
Amber Hearn	125	54	2004	2018	Australia	20112015	2008 20122016		
Wendi Henderson	64	17	1987	2008	United States	1991 2007			
Kristy Hill	20	0	2008	2012	Argentina	2011	2008 2012		
Michelle Hodge	3	0	1998	2000	Germany				
Julie Hogg	17	6	1979	1983	Australia				
Rachel Howard	14	0	1998	2008	United States	2007	2008		
Joy Howland	4	0	1996	1996	South Korea				
Michelle Hudson	2	0	1983	1983	New Caledonia				
Dana Humby	2	0	2004	2004	United States				
Emma Humphries	12	0	2006	2008	China	2007		2006	
Julie Inglis	15	0	1984	1987	Switzerland				
Maia Jackman	50	12	1993	2010	Canada	2007			
Deven Jackson	1	0	2023	2023	United States				
Maureen Jacobson	53	17	1979	1995	Australia	1991			
Grace Jale	25	4	2018	2024	Tonga	2023		20162018	2016
Carol James	2	0	1991	1991	Papua New Guinea				
Kelly Jarden	13	0	1997	2003	China				
Maggie Jenkins	1	0	2017	2017	Thailand			2018	20162018
Nell Jongeneel	4	0	1975	1975	Hong Kong				
Emma Kete	52	3	2007	2019	Australia	20112015 2019	2008	2006	
Leslie King	27	0	1987	1994	United States	1991			
Katie Kitching	4	0	2023	2024	Colombia				
Carol Knox	4	0	1975	1975	Hong Kong				
Anna Leat	14	0	2017	2024	Austria	2023	2020	2018	20162018
Elaine Lee	1	1	1975	1975	Hong Kong				
Megan Lee	4	0	2013	2014	United States			2014	20102012
Debbie Leonidas	17	1	1975	1981	Hong Kong				
Renee Leota	15	1	2006	2008	China		2008	2006 2008 2010	
Lesley Letcher	4	1	1989	1991	Chinese Taipei				
Annalie Longo	133	15	2006	2023	China	2007 20112015 2019 2023	20122016 2020	2006 2008 2010	2008
Michelle Loos	15	0	1980	1983	Australia				
Kate Loye	1	0	2015	2015	Brazil			2012	2010
Grazia MacIntosh	4	0	1981	1982	Australia				
Elise Mamanu-Gray	1	0	2017	2017	Thailand				
Marilyn Marshall	17	9	1975	1981	Hong Kong				
Debbie Mathieson	2	0	1981	1981	Australia				
Kelly Mawston	6	0	1994	1996	Bulgaria				
Terry McCahill	40	1	1991	2003	Australia	1991			
Emily McColl	19	0	2007	2008	Solomon Islands	2007	2008		
Sarah McLaughlin	11	0	2009	2011	China	2011		2008 2010	2008
Andrea Meikle	1	0	1986	1986	Chinese Taipei				
Pip Meo	5	0	2004	2004	Australia				
Zoe Miller	5	0	1994	1995	Bulgaria				
Evie Millynn	2	0	2014	2014	South Korea	2015		2012 2014	2010
Elizabeth Milne	5	1	2009	2010	China			2008 2010	
Meikayla Moore	63	4	2013	2023	China	2015 2019	2016 2020	20142016	2012
Hayley Moorwood	92	10	2003	2013	Samoa	2007 2011	2008 2012		
Sarah Morton	6	1	2018	2019	Japan	2019		20162018	2016
Ruby Nathan	4	0	2023	2024	Colombia			2022	2022
Erin Nayler	83	0	2013	2023	Italy	2015 2019 2023	2016 2020	2010 2012	
Tania Neill	6	0	1993	1996	Trinidad and Tobago				
Grace Neville	7	0	2023	2024	United States				
Jo Nicholson	4	0	1979	1986	Australia				
Kim Nye	15	3	1989	1994	Australia	1991			
Tayla O'Brien	1	0	2023	2023	United States			2014	
Rachel Oliver	22	0	1995	2000	South Korea				
Nadia Olla	1	0	2018	2018	New Caledonia	2019		20162018	2016
Liz O'Meara	1	0	2003	2003	Cook Islands				
Rebecca O'Neill	1	0	2005	2005	Japan				
Marlies Oostdam	33	0	1996	2009	Australia	2007	2008		
Vicki Ormond	4	0	2000	2000	Japan				
Anne Ormrod	2	0	2004	2004	United States				
Lorinda Panther	11	0	1983	1986	Australia				
Jocelyn Parr	4	0	1991	1991	Australia	1991			
Holly Patterson	8	0	2012	2013	Northern Ireland			2012	2010
Lynley Pedruco	17	0	1984	1994	Switzerland	1991			
Ria Percival	166	15	2006	2023	China	2007 20112015 2019 2023	2008 2012 2016 2020	2006 2008	
Jasmine Pereira	25	1	2004	2017	Cook Islands	2015	2016	20142016	2012
Aimee Phillips	8	1	2015	2019	Brazil				
Mary-Anne Poole	2	0	1975	1975	Hong Kong				
Judy Porter	1	0	1979	1979	Australia				
Stephanie Puckrin	1	0	2007	2007	Tonga	2007			
Martine Puketapu	4	0	2017	2017	Austria			20142016	20122014
Deborah Pullen	38	10	1979	1993	Australia	1991			
Meisha Pyke	5	0	2000	2004	Japan				
Jana Radosavljevic	3	0	2019	2020	China				
Brooke Rangi	3	0	2004	2004	Australia				
Melissa Ray	8	0	2003	2007	Cook Islands				
Michelle Redfern	1	0	1991	1991	Australia				
Gabrielle Rennie	32	2	2021	2024	Australia	2023	2020		2018
Petria Rennie	1	0	2005	2005	Japan			2006	
Isobel Richardson	2	2	1975	1975	Australia				
Audrey Rigby	14	1	1983	1987	Australia				
Ali Riley	159	2	2007	2023	Australia	2007 20112015 2019 2023	2008 20122016 2020	2006	
Indiah-Paige Riley	19	2	2022	2024	Mexico	2023			
Carol Roberts	5	0	1984	1984	Switzerland				
Fiona Roberts	2	0	1994	1994	Ghana				
Alisse Robertson	1	0	2000	2000	United States				
Vivienne Robertson	31	9	1989	1991	Australia	1991			
Rebecca Roche	2	0	1987	1987	Western Samoa				
Andrea Rogers	11	0	1994	1996	Bulgaria				
Emma Rolston	15	6	2018	2023	Scotland		2020	2016	
Katie Rood	15	5	2017	2021	United States				
Rebecca Rolls	22	0	1994	2016	Bulgaria	2015	20122016		
Melissa Ruscoe	23	2	1994	2000	Bulgaria				
Paige Satchell	48	2	2016	2023	Australia	2019 2023	2020	20162018	2016
Tina Salu	4	0	1980	1987	Australia				
Wendy Sharpe	47	34	1980	1995	Australia				
Jane Simpson	17	1	1997	2004	Australia				
Rebecca Simpson	7	0	2004	2007	Australia				
Stephanie Skilton	12	0	2014	2020	Switzerland	2019		20122014	2010
Anne Smith	8	0	1984	1989	Switzerland	1991			
Jane Smith	1	0	1994	1994	Russia				
Merissa Smith	15	1	2006	2008	China	2007	2008	2006 2008	
Nicola Smith	23	14	1998	2007	Germany				
Rebecca Smith	74	6	2003	2012	Samoa	2007 2011	2008 2012		
Rebecca Sowden	10	0	2004	2007	China				
Malia Steinmetz	27	0	2017	2023	Thailand	2023		2016 2018	2014
Tina Stevenson	2	0	1995	1995	South Korea				
Rebekah Stott	98	4	1994	2024	China	2015 2019 2023	20122016		
Nicole Stratford	3	0	2019	2020	China				
Pauline Sullivan	11	0	1982	1982	Chinese Taipei				
Danielle Taylor	5 (Note: Some sources list Taylor with 7 caps)	1	2003	2007	South Korea				
Kate Taylor	13	1	2022	2024	Norway			2022	
Lorraine Taylor	21	0	1989	1995	Australia	1991			
Maria Te Huia	4	0	1979	1980	Australia				
Rebecca Tegg	10	0	2007	2008	Australia	2007	2008		
Zoe Thompson	12	2	2004	2007	China	2007			
Gillian Thurlow	1	0	1994	1994	Australia				
Yvonne Vale	13	0	1994	2003	Russia				
Monique van de Elzen	21	9	1987	1991	United States	1991			
Rebecca van der Vegt	6	0	1981	1981	Australia				
Hannah Wall	11	2	2009	2011	China			2008 2010	2008
Carol Waller	4	0	1975	1975	Hong Kong				
Ashleigh Ward	4	0	2021	2023	South Korea			2012 2014	
Lynne Warring	4	1	1991	1994	Papua New Guinea	1991			
Nora Watkins	10	2	1975	1980	Hong Kong				
Rosie White	111	24	2010	2021	China	20112015 2019	20122016	2008 2010 2012	2008
Ella Wiebe	1	0	2009	2009	Japan				
Melissa Wileman	10	0	1995	1998	South Korea				
Hannah Wilkinson	120	29	2011	2024	Australia	20112015 2019 2023	20122016 2020	2010 2012	
Grace Wisnewski	3	0	2023	2023	United States			2022	2018
Kirsty Yallop	104	12	2004	2017	United States	20112015	2008 20122016	2006	
Pam Yates	3	0	2004	2005	United States				

== See also ==
- List of New Zealand international footballers
