= New Zealand Footballer of the Year =

Annual top New Zealand footballer award

Footballer of the Year
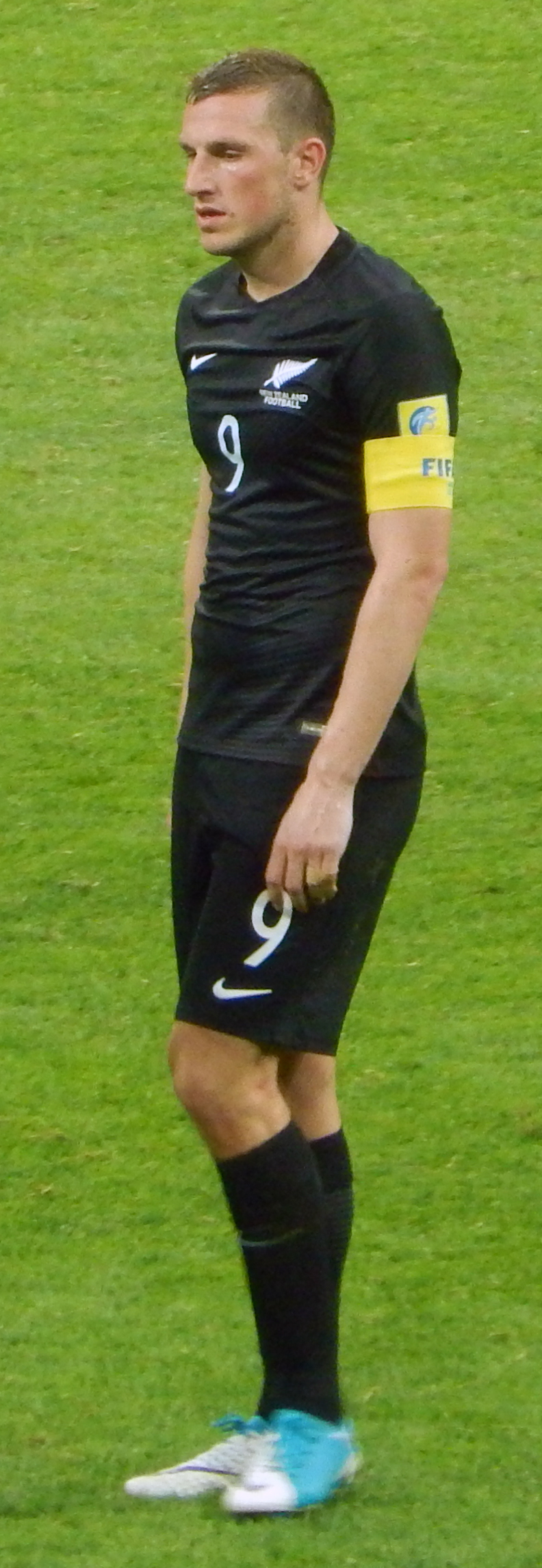
- Chris Wood won the award in 2020/21
- Country: New Zealand
- First award: 1970
- Current holder: Chris Wood (2020/21)

Highlights
- Most awards: Chris Wood (4)

Women's Footballer of the Year
- Country: New Zealand
- First award: 1987
- Current holder: Katie Bowen (2023)

Highlights
- Most awards: Maureen Jacobson (2)

The New Zealand Football Awards is an awards ceremony held for the best New Zealand association football players. The ceremony has been held annually since 1970.

== Male footballer of the year ==
Year	Winner	Club
1970	Mick Seed	(New Zealand) Blockhouse Bay
1971	Ron Armstrong	(New Zealand) North Shore United
1972	Ian Ormond	(New Zealand) Blockhouse Bay
1973	Maurice Tillotson	(New Zealand) Gisborne City
1974	Brian Turner	(New Zealand) Mount Wellington
1975	Roy Drinkwater	(New Zealand) Christchurch United
1976	Keith Nelson	(New Zealand) Hamilton United
1977	Alf Stamp	(New Zealand) Eastern Suburbs
1978	Tony Sibley	(New Zealand) Mount Wellington
1979	Brian Turner	(New Zealand) Mount Wellington
1980	Brian Turner	(New Zealand) Mount Wellington
1981	Grant Turner	(New Zealand) Gisborne City
1982	Keith Nelson	(New Zealand) Mount Wellington
1983	Steve Sumner	(New Zealand) Manurewa
1984	Colin Walker	(New Zealand) Gisborne City
1985	Kevin Hagan	(New Zealand) North Shore United
1986	Grant Turner	(New Zealand) Miramar Rangers
1987	Ceri Evans	(New Zealand) Christchurch United
1988	Michael McGarry	(New Zealand) Mosgiel
1989	Noel Barkley	(New Zealand) Mount Wellington
1990	Noel Barkley	(New Zealand) Mount Wellington
1991	Michael McGarry	(New Zealand) Roslyn-Wakari
1992	Noel Barkley	(New Zealand) Waitakere City
1993	Paul Halford	(New Zealand) Napier City Rovers
1994	Darren McClennan	(New Zealand) Waitakere City
1995	Chris Jackson	(New Zealand) Napier City Rovers
1996	(Solomon Islands) Batram Suri	(New Zealand) Nelson Suburbs
1997	Jason Batty	(New Zealand) North Shore United
1998	Fred de Jong	(New Zealand) Central United
1999	Christian Bouckenooghe	(Belgium) Roeselare
2000	Fred de Jong	(New Zealand) Football Kingz
2001	(Scotland) Graham Little	
2002	(Scotland) Graham Little	
2003	Andrew Boyens	(New Zealand) Otago University
2004	Not awarded	
2005	(South Africa) Grant Young	
2006	(South Africa) Grant Young	
2007	Ben Sigmund	(New Zealand) Auckland City
2008	Ben Sigmund	(New Zealand) Auckland City/Wellington Phoenix
2009	(Fiji) Roy Krishna	(New Zealand) Waitakere United
2010	Aaron Clapham	(New Zealand) Canterbury United
2011	Allan Pearce	(New Zealand) Waitakere United
2012	(Wales) Chris Bale	(New Zealand) Waitakere United/Auckland City
2013	Not awarded	
2014	Not awarded	
2015	Winston Reid	(England) West Ham United
2016	Winston Reid	(England) West Ham United
2017	Chris Wood	(England) Leeds United/Burnley
2018	Chris Wood	(England) Burnley
2019	Chris Wood	(England) Burnley
2020/2021	Chris Wood	(England) Burnley
2022–2024	Not awarded	

== Female footballer of the year ==
Year	Winner	Club
1987	Rebecca Roche; Monique Van de Elzen	
1988	Not awarded	
1989	Not awarded	
1990	Not awarded	
1991	Debbie Pullen	
1992	Lorraine Taylor	
1993	Maureen Jacobson	(England) Millwall Lionesses
1994	Maureen Jacobson	
1995	Kelly Mawston	
1996	Amanda Crawford	
1997	Melissa Ruscoe	
1998	Michele Cox	
1999	Wendi Henderson	
2000–2015	Not awarded	
2016	Annalie Longo	
2017	Rebekah Stott	(United States) Seattle Reign/ (Australia) Melbourne City
2018–2022	Not awarded	
2023	Katie Bowen	(Australia) Melbourne City/ (Italy) Inter Milan

== Male international footballer of the year ==
Year	Winner	Club
2018	Sarpreet Singh	(New Zealand) Wellington Phoenix
2019	Chris Wood	(England) Burnley
2020/2021	Chris Wood	(England) Burnley
2022	Not awarded	
2023	Chris Wood	(England) Newcastle United/ (England) Nottingham Forest

== Female international footballer of the year ==
Year	Winner	Club
2000	Melissa Ruscoe	
2001	Amanda Crawford	
2002	Rachel Oliver	
2003	Nicky Smith	
2004	Amber Hearn	(England) Arsenal
2005	Simone Ferrara	
2006	Ali Riley	(United States) Stanford Cardinal
2007	Rebecca Smith	(Sweden) Sunnanå SK
2008	Ali Riley	(United States) Stanford Cardinal
2009	Ali Riley	(United States) Stanford Cardinal/Pali Blues
2010	Ali Riley	(United States) FC Gold Pride
2011	Ali Riley	(United States) Western New York Flash
2012–2017	Not awarded	
2018	Betsy Hassett	(Iceland) KR
2019	Rebekah Stott	(Norway) Avaldsnes IL/ (Australia) Melbourne City
2020/2021	Ria Percival	(England) Tottenham Hotspur
2022	Not awarded	
2023	Katie Bowen	(Australia) Melbourne City/ (Italy) Inter Milan

== Male domestic footballer of the year ==
Year	Winner	Club
2018	(New Zealand) Callum McCowatt	Auckland City/Eastern Suburbs
2019	(New Zealand) Jack-Henry Sinclair	Team Wellington
2020/2021	(New Zealand) Alex Greive	Waitakere United/Birkenhead United
2022	Not awarded	
2023	(New Zealand) Cameron Howieson	Auckland City

== Female domestic footballer of the year ==
Year	Winner	Club
2018	(New Zealand) Annalie Longo	Canterbury United Pride
2019	(New Zealand) Steph Skilton	Auckland Football
2020/2021	(New Zealand) Annalie Longo	Canterbury United Pride
2022	Not awarded	
2023	(New Zealand) Deven Jackson	Eastern Suburbs

== Male young footballer of the year ==
Year	Winner	Club
1979	Duncan Cole	(New Zealand) North Shore United
1980	Ricki Herbert	(New Zealand) Mount Wellington
1981	Wynton Rufer	(New Zealand) Wellington Diamond
1982	Wynton Rufer	(England) Norwich City/ (New Zealand) Miramar Rangers/ (Switzerland) FC Zürich
1983	Colin Tuaa	(New Zealand) Papatoetoe
1984	Neal Cave	
1985	Michael McGarry	
1986	Darren McClennan	(New Zealand) North Shore United
1987	Robert Ironside	(New Zealand) North Shore United/ (Australia) Sydney Olympic
1988	Chris Jackson	(New Zealand) Napier City Rovers
1989	Martin Akers	(New Zealand) Napier City Rovers
1990	Thomas Edge	
1991	Lawrence Fitzpatrick	
1992	Vaughan Coveny	(New Zealand) Miramar Rangers/ (Australia) Melbourne Knights
1993	Matthew Rennie	
1994	Ivan Vicelich	(New Zealand) Waitakere City
1995	Simon Elliott	(New Zealand) Wellington Olympic
1996	Danny Hay	(New Zealand) Central United
1997	Noah Hickey	(New Zealand) Central United
1998	Paul Urlovic	(New Zealand) Central United
1999	Ryan Nelsen	(United States) Stanford Cardinal
2000	Jeff Campbell	(New Zealand) Football Kingz
2001	Brent Fisher	(New Zealand) Canterbury United
2002	Jamie Duncan	
2003	Stuart Hogg	(New Zealand) East Auckland
2004	Not awarded	
2005	Daniel Keat	(New Zealand) Team Wellington
2006–2015	Not awarded	
2016	Sam Brotherton	(United States) Wisconsin Badgers/Des Moines Menace
2017	Clayton Lewis	(New Zealand) Auckland City/ (England) Scunthorpe United
2018	Liberato Cacace	(New Zealand) Wellington Phoenix
2019	Sarpreet Singh	(New Zealand) Wellington Phoenix/ (Germany) Bayern Munich
2020/2021	Liberato Cacace	(New Zealand) Wellington Phoenix/ (Belgium) Sint-Truiden
2022	Not awarded	
2023	Marko Stamenić	(Denmark) Copenhagen/ (Serbia) Red Star Belgrade

== Female young footballer of the year ==
Year	Winner	Club
2000	Nicky Smith	
2001	Zoe Thompson	
2002	Priscilla Duncan	
2003	Priscilla Duncan	
2004	Hayley Moorwood	(United States) Southwest Baptist Bearcats
2005	Kirsty Yallop	
2006	Ali Riley	(United States) Stanford Cardinal
2007	Abby Erceg	(New Zealand) Western Springs
2008	Rosie White	
2009	Rosie White	
2010	Olivia Chance	(New Zealand) Claudelands Rovers
2011	Hannah Wilkinson	(New Zealand) Glenfield Rovers
2012–2017	Not awarded	
2018	Anna Leat	(New Zealand) East Coast Bays
2019	Claudia Bunge	(New Zealand) Northern Lights
2020/2021	Anna Leat	(United States) Georgetown Hoyas/ (England) West Ham United
2022	Not awarded	
2023	Indiah-Paige Riley	(Australia) Brisbane Roar/ (Netherlands) PSV

== Male coach of the year/Male international coach of the year ==
Year	Winner	Club
1986	(New Zealand) Dave Farrington	
1987	(Scotland) Ian Marshall	
1988	(Scotland) Ian Marshall	
1989	Keith Buckley	
1990	(New Zealand) Dave Taylor	
1991	Martin Stewart	(New Zealand) Christchurch United
1992	Roger Wilkinson	
1993	(England) Mick Waitt	(New Zealand) Napier City Rovers
1994	(Scotland) Keith Pritchett	(New Zealand) Waitakere City
1995	(Scotland) Keith Pritchett	(New Zealand) Waitakere City
1996	(Scotland) Keith Pritchett	New Zealand men's national football team
1997	(England) Mick Waitt	(New Zealand) Napier City Rovers
1998	(England) Mick Waitt	(New Zealand) Napier City Rovers
1999	(New Zealand) Kevin Fallon	New Zealand national under-17 football team
2000	(New Zealand) Kevin Fallon	
2001	(New Zealand) Stu Jacobs	
2002	(New Zealand) Stu Jacobs	
2003	(New Zealand) Chris Milicich	
2004	Not awarded	
2005	(England) Allan Jones	(New Zealand) Auckland City
2006	(England) John Herdman	New Zealand women's national football team
2007	(New Zealand) Ricki Herbert	New Zealand men's national football team/New Zealand Knights/Wellington Phoenix
2008	(England) John Herdman	New Zealand women's national football team
2009	(New Zealand) Ricki Herbert	New Zealand men's national football team/Wellington Phoenix
2010	(New Zealand) Ricki Herbert	New Zealand men's national football team/Wellington Phoenix
2011	(Spain) Ramon Tribulietx	(New Zealand) Auckland City
2012–2015	Not awarded	
2016	(England) Jose Figueira	(New Zealand) Central United/Team Wellington
2017	(Japan) Hiroshi Miyazawa	(New Zealand) Onehunga Sports
2018	(New Zealand) Leon Birnie	New Zealand women's national under-17 football team
2019	(England) Des Buckingham	New Zealand men's national football team/New Zealand national under-23 football team/New Zealand national under-20 football team
2020/2021	(New Zealand) Danny Hay	New Zealand men's national football team/New Zealand national under-23 football team
2022	Not awarded	
2023	(New Zealand) Darren Bazeley	New Zealand men's national football team

== Male domestic coach of the year ==
Year	Winner	Club
2023	(New Zealand) Rupert Kemeys	Wellington Olympic

== Female coach of the year ==
Year	Winner	Club
2018	(Wales) Gemma Lewis	
2019	(New Zealand) Alana Gunn	Canterbury United Pride
2020/2021	(Wales) Gemma Lewis	Football Ferns Development Programme/Wellington Phoenix
2022	Not awarded	
2023	(Wales) Maia Vink	Western Springs

== Male referee of the year ==
Year	Winner
1990	Gary Fleet
1991	Gary Fleet
1992	Gary Fleet
1993	Gary Fleet
1994	Gary Fleet
1995	Gary Fleet
1996	Brian Precious
1997	Bruce Grimshaw
1998	Bruce Grimshaw
1999	Derek Rugg
2000	Brian Precious
2001	Steve Sargent
2002	Steve Sargent
2003	Ian Walker
2004	Peter O'Leary
2005	Peter O'Leary
2006	Neil Fox
2007	Peter O'Leary
2008	Peter O'Leary
2009	Mike Hester
2010	Mike Hester
2011	Peter O'Leary
2012–2015	Not awarded
2016	Matt Conger
2017	Matt Conger
2018	Matt Conger
2019	Matt Conger
2020/2021	Matt Conger
2022	Not awarded
2023	Campbell-Kirk Kawana-Waugh

== Female referee of the year ==
Year	Winner
2018	Anna-Marie Keighley
2019	Anna-Marie Keighley
2020/2021	Anna-Marie Keighley
2022	Not awarded
2023	Anna-Marie Keighley

== See also ==
- List of sports awards honoring women
