= Rangers A.F.C. =

Rangers AFC
- Full name: Rangers Association Football Club
- Founded: 1913
- Dissolved: 2007
- League: Mainland Premier League

Rangers AFC was one of the oldest football teams in New Zealand and was located in Christchurch, New Zealand. In 2007 they merged with New Brighton to form Coastal Spirit

== History ==
Rangers AFC was founded in 1910 by a group of dedicated players who were denied the opportunity to play on Saturday owing to the nature of their employment. All were employed in the retail trade, which in 1910 opened all day Saturday for business and closed on a Thursday afternoon and games were arranged against teams which could play them that particular day.

The club was officially constituted under the Canterbury Football Association in 1913 when the half-day closing on Saturday was adopted for all retail merchants.

The years 1916 to 1923 were very strong ones for the club. They won their first championship in 1916, the English Cup in 1917 and 1918, the English Cup again in 1921. The Hurley Shield in 1922, the English Cup in 1923.

The highlight of the club's administration came in 1962, when they purchased the 5 acres (2.0 ha) of land in McGregors Road, which was named Rangers Park (now Eric Adam Park).

The first year of the Southern League in 1968 saw the appointment of Terry Haydon as the club's first professional coach, and he soon produced a team that was rated second in the top ten in NZ and narrowly lost the first Southern League competition on goal average. During this period of the late 60's Rangers played a part in the formation of Christchurch United AFC for the proposed forthcoming National League to start in 1970. Rangers provided a quarter of the A class shares in Christchurch United and also several prominent players, including Terry Haydon and Victor Pollard, who were both selected for New Zealand teams while playing for Rangers. Rangers still hold twenty five percent of the A class shares but do not exercise their right to have a director on United's board.

Determined to make National League status on their own, and in their own way, Rangers concentrated again on overcoming the loss of their best players to United and after a slow start, the 70's were the most successful period in the club's history up to that time, culminating in a place in the National League for 1980. The team won the Southern League in 1973, the Northern Division in 1974, the full Southern League again in 1975, runners up in 1976, third in 1977, runners up in 1978 and won it in 1979. In the years 1973 and 1975 they took part in the play-offs for a place in the National League but were unsuccessful.

Rangers eventually won automatic promotion to National League for the 1980 season and finished ninth in the League. At the end of 1981 Rangers were relegated. In 1984 they were second in the Southern League and challenged unsuccessfully for a National League place in the play-off series. As winners of the Southern League in 1985 they again challenged unsuccessfully for a place in the National League. With the introduction of the Winfield Superclub competition in 1993 came an influx of ex Christchurch United players. They finished runners-up in the Southern section and qualified for the national top eight competition and also the Chatham Cup Final, going down 6–0 to Napier City Rovers.

In 2007 they merged with New Brighton to form Coastal Spirit.

== Colours and badge ==
Rangers AFC's colours were white shirts, black shorts and black socks. The colours were based on Derby County Colours, and were finalised in the early 1970s by the club secretary Bert Koppes. The change colours were all sky blue. The club's 'stylised lion' crest was designed in 1972 by Yaap Koster. It is based on the lion found on the crest of the famous Scottish club, Rangers FC, and chosen because of the similarity in club names.

== Stadium ==
Rangers AFC used to play their home matches on Eric Adam Park (formerly known as Rangers Park) in Christchurch. Their secondary ground was Cuthberts Green.

== Noted players ==
Listed according to when they debuted for Rangers AFC first team (year in parentheses), women in quotes:

- 1910s–1920s: Alex Bisset (1919), Len Barwell
- 1950s: Ron Moore (1958)
- 1960s: Terry Haydon (1968), Victor Pollard (1968), Ken Olley (1962), Dick Durant (1962), Derek Torkington (1968), Alex Inglis (1960), Malcolm Parker (1969)
- 1970s: Derek Phillips (1970), Richard Hadlee (1971), Neil Francis (1971), Gordon Faichnie (1972), Geoff Taylor (1974), Steve Welford ( 1975)

Owen Nuttridge (1976), John Souter (1976), Mike Fulham (1977), Paul Welford (1977), Luke Campfens (1977), Scott Dewar (1977), Jeff Blackburn (1978), Grant Hughes (1978), "Ingrid Hall", "Tina Faichnie"

- 1980s: Ian Cowan (1980), Bobby Almond (1983), "Rowena Fulham", "Michelle Hudson", "Kelly Jarden"
- 1990s: John Campbell (1990), Nathan Astle (1990), Mike Harvey (1991), Alan Carville (1993), Mike Fullen (1993), Garry Lund (1993), Alan Stroud (1993), Laurence Fitzpatrick (1993), Neil Hinton (1994), Deane Hutchinson (1995), Jason Stapley (1995), Nic Longley (1995), Paul Hughes (1997), Richard Wilson (1999)
- 2000s: Chris Peck (2000), "Sara Clapham", Jacabo Egues (2002), Nathan Knox (2003), "Ingrid Bain" (2004), Vitalijs Teplovs (2006)

== Noted coaches ==
Listed according to when they became coaches for Rangers AFC (year in parentheses):

- 1970s: Bob Carter (1972), Ian Marshall (1973), Ken France (1977)
- 1990s: Fred Simpson (1999)

== Achievements ==
- Mainland Premier League:
  - Runners-up (1): 2001
- Chatham Cup:
  - Runners-up (1): 1993
- English Cup:
  - Winners (7): 1917, 1918, 1921, 1923, 1979, 1994, 1995
  - Runners-up (4): 1964, 1989, 1992, 1993
- Rangers Pre-Season Tournament:
  - Winners (5): 1976, 1987, 1992, 1993, 2002
  - Runners-up (9): 1973, 1975, 1978, 1979, 1982, 1985, 1986, 1995, 2003, 2006
- Canterbury Premier League:
  - Runners-up (1): 1998
- Superclub South:
  - Runners-up (1): 1993
- Superclub South Plate:
  - Winners (1): 1994
- Southern League:
  - Winners (6): 1973, 1975, 1979, 1983, 1984, 1985
  - Runners-up (5): 1968, 1976, 1978, 1982, 1987
- Southern League (North):
  - Winners (4): 1974, 1982, 1983, 1985
  - Runners-up (1): 1984
- Hurley Shield (Canterbury Championship):
  - Winners (3): 1916, 1922, 1931 (shared)
- Division 1 Cup:
  - Winners (2): 1963, 1964
  - Runners-up (2): 1968, 1969
- Canterbury Division 2:
  - Winners (2): 1927, 1957
  - Runners-up (1): 1963
- Division 2 Cup:
  - Winners (1): 1927
  - Runners-up (1): 1957
- Hurley Shield (Canterbury Pre-Season):
  - Winners (1): 1991
  - Runners-up (2): 1988, 1993
- Junior National Cup:
  - Winners (2): 1976, 1977
- Canterbury Women's League:
  - Winners (6): 1976, 1977, 1978, 1979, 1981, 1982

== Records ==
- League victory: 9–1 v Shamrock AFC, 20 July 1968; 9–0 (Div 2) v Christchurch City AFC Reserves, 13 July 1957; 10–2 (Div 2) v Wigram, 11 May 1963, 9–1 (Div 2) v Hornby, 10 June 1963
- National League placing: 9th, 1980; 8th place in National round of Superclub 1993
- Men's First Team Appearances as at end of 2006: 357, Mike Harvey (1991–2006)
- Men's First Team Goals as at end of 2006: 159, Malcolm Parker (1969–1986), 303 games
