= 2007 OFC Women's Championship =

2007 OFC Women's Nations Cup
Tournament details
- Host country: Papua New Guinea
- Dates: 9–13 April 2007
- Teams: 4 (from 1 confederation)
- Venue: 1 (in 1 host city)

Final positions
- Champions: New Zealand (3rd title)
- Runners-up: Papua New Guinea
- Third place: Tonga
- Fourth place: Solomon Islands

Tournament statistics
- Matches played: 6
- Goals scored: 30 (5 per match)
- Top scorer(s): (New Zealand) Nicky Smith (New Zealand) Kirsty Yallop (4 goals)

The 2007 OFC Women's Championship of women's association football took place in Lae, Papua New Guinea between 9 April and 13 April. It was the eighth edition of the tournament.

The tournament was also known as the OFC Women's World Cup Qualifier, as the winner qualified for the 2007 Women's World Cup.

New Zealand have never lost a match to any of their three competitors at the OFC Women's Championship, with the closest result being a 2–0 win over Papua New Guinea in 1995.

The Cook Islands, Fiji, New Caledonia, Samoa, Tahiti and Vanuatu were announced to take part, but withdrew before the tournament was organized.

New Zealand won their record-tying third tournament title and qualified for their first FIFA Women's World Cup in 16 years.

== Participating nations ==
Of the eleven nations affiliated to the Oceania Football Confederation, only four entered the tournament.

Team	Tournament appearance	Last appearance	Previous best performance
New Zealand	8th	2003	Winners (1983, 1991)
Papua New Guinea	6th	2003	3rd (1991, 1994, 1998, 2003)
Solomon Islands	1st	—	—
Tonga	1st	—	—

== Officials ==
The following referees and assistant referees were named for the tournament.

Referees

- (Australia) Amelia Morris
- (Papua New Guinea) Job Minan Ponis
- (Vanuatu) Lencie Fred

Assistant Referees

- (Fiji) Rohitesh Dayal
- (Papua New Guinea) Joakim Salaiau Sosongan
- (Solomon Islands) Hilary Ani
- (Solomon Islands) Jackson Namo
- (Solomon Islands) Neil Polosso
- (Solomon Islands) Hamilton Siau

== Results ==
Team	Pld	W	D	L	GF	GA	GD	Pts	Note
New Zealand	3	3	0	0	21	1	+20	9	Champions and qualified for 2007 FIFA Women's World Cup
Papua New Guinea	3	2	0	1	7	8	–1	6	
Tonga	3	0	1	2	1	7	–6	1	
Solomon Islands	3	0	1	2	1	14	–13	1	

9 April 2007

New Zealand	6–1	Tonga
Yallop 8', 73'; Henderson 13', 53'; Erceg 17'; Thompson 81'	Report	Feke 85'

Sir Ignatius Kilage Stadium
Referee: Job Minan Ponis (Papua New Guinea)
9 April 2007

Papua New Guinea	6–1	Solomon Islands
Chalau 8', 48'; Siniu 40', 50', 66'; Galo 45' (o.g.)	Report	Fula 44'

Sir Ignatius Kilage Stadium

11 April 2007

New Zealand	8–0	Solomon Islands
Ferrara 4', 22'; N. Smith 32', 45+2', 62'; Percival 38'; R. Smith 52'; Kete 90+1'	Report

Sir Ignatius Kilage Stadium
11 April 2007

Papua New Guinea	1–0	Tonga
Niukapu 63' (o.g.)	Report

Sir Ignatius Kilage Stadium
Referee: Lencie Fred (Vanuatu)

13 April 2007

Papua New Guinea	0–7	New Zealand
	Report	N. Smith 20'; Thompson 23'; Percival 26'; Yallop 30', 65'; Green 63'; Moorwood 85'

Sir Ignatius Kilage Stadium
Referee: Amelia Morris (Australia)
13 April 2007

Tonga	0–0	Solomon Islands

Sir Ignatius Kilage Stadium

== Awards ==
2007 OFC Women's Championship winners

New Zealand
Third title

== Goalscorers ==
4 goals

- (New Zealand) Nicky Smith
- (New Zealand) Kirsty Yallop

3 goals

- (Papua New Guinea) Deslyn Siniu

2 goals

- (New Zealand) Simone Ferrara
- (New Zealand) Wendi Henderson
- (New Zealand) Ria Percival
- (New Zealand) Zoe Thompson
- (Papua New Guinea) Jacqueline Chalau

1 goal

- (New Zealand) Abby Erceg
- (New Zealand) Anna Green
- (New Zealand) Emma Kete
- (New Zealand) Hayley Moorwood
- (New Zealand) Rebecca Smith
- (Solomon Islands) Prudence Fula
- (Tonga) Vasi Feke

Own goals

- (Solomon Islands) Prudence Fula (for Papua New Guinea)
- (Tonga) Mele Vaisioa Mahe Niukapu (for Papua New Guinea)
