= 2003 OFC Women's Championship =

Tournament details
- Host country: Australia
- Dates: 5–13 April 2003
- Teams: 5 (from 1 confederation)
- Venue: 1 (in 1 host city)

Final positions
- Champions: Australia (3rd title)
- Runners-up: New Zealand
- Third place: Papua New Guinea
- Fourth place: Samoa

Tournament statistics
- Matches played: 10
- Goals scored: 88 (8.8 per match)
- Attendance: 5,900 (590 per match)
- Top scorer: (New Zealand) Maia Jackman (10 goals)

The 2003 OFC Women's Championship was held in Canberra, Australia from 5 to 13 April 2003. It was the seventh staging of the OFC Women's Championship.

Originally scheduled for 19–29 November 2002, the tournament was postponed after withdrawal by American Samoa, Tahiti and Tonga. A rescheduled tournament with seven teams in two groups was arranged, however Fiji and Vanuatu withdrew, resulting in a five nation championship of one group.

The tournament served as the OFC's qualifying tournament for the FIFA Women's World Cup 2003. OFC's one berth was given to the winner – Australia.

== Participating nations ==
Of the twelve nations affiliated to the Oceania Football Confederation, five entered the tournament. Also, this was Australia's last appearance in the tournament before moving to the Asian Football Confederation in 2006.

Team	Tournament appearance	Last appearance	Previous best performance
Australia	7th	1998	Winners (1994, 1998)
Cook Islands	1st	—	—
New Zealand	7th	1998	Winners (1983, 1991)
Papua New Guinea	5th	1998	3rd (1991, 1994, 1998)
Samoa	2nd	1998	Group Stage (1998)

== Officials ==
4 referees were named for the tournament:

- (Australia) Tammy Ogston
- (Australia) Krystyna Szokolai
- (Fiji) Rajendra Singh
- (Papua New Guinea) Joakim Salaiau Sosongan

== Results ==
Team	Pld	W	D	L	GF	GA	GD	Pts	Qualification
Australia	4	4	0	0	45	0	+45	12	Champions and qualified for 2003 FIFA Women's World Cup
New Zealand	4	3	0	1	29	2	+27	9	
Papua New Guinea	4	2	0	2	10	21	−11	6	
Samoa	4	1	0	3	3	39	−36	3	
Cook Islands	4	0	0	4	1	26	−25	0	

5 April 2003

Cook Islands	1–5	Papua New Guinea
Rakei 29'		Matthies 21'; Konalalai 23'; Limbai 40', 87'; Banabas 42'

Belconnen Soccer Centre
Attendance: 250
Referee: Tammy Ogston (Australia)
5 April 2003

Australia	19–0	Samoa
Peters 5', 35', 50', 79'; Golebiowski 16', 42', 46', 61'; Davies 18'; Small 41', 78'; Mann 53', 58', 85', 87'; Wainwright 55'; Slatyer 56', 57'; Garriock 72'

Belconnen Soccer Centre
Attendance: 750
Referee: Rajendra Singh (Fiji)

7 April 2003

Australia	11–0	Cook Islands
Crawford 8', 17'; Davies 11'; Alagich 34', 62' (pen.); Karp 37', 81'; Hohnke 59'; Small 65'; Wilson 71', 82'

Belconnen Soccer Centre
Attendance: 600
Referee: Joakim Salaiau Sosongan (Papua New Guinea)
7 April 2003

Samoa	0–15	New Zealand
		Jackman 5', 9', 24', 50'; Ferrara 7', 10', 32'; Smith 11', 12', 42', 65', 87'; Moorwood 41'; Michele 80', 82'

Belconnen Soccer Centre
Attendance: 200
Referee: Krystyna Szokolai (Australia)

9 April 2003

Cook Islands	0–9	New Zealand
		Ferrara 4', 22'; Jackman 13', 33', 49'; Smith 30'; Henderson 53'; Simpson 59'; McCahill 88'

Belconnen Soccer Centre
Attendance: 250
Referee: Tammy Ogston (Australia)
9 April 2003

Australia	13–0	Papua New Guinea
Mann 5', 41', 49', 55'; Peters 17'; Salisbury 29', 81' (pen.); Alagich 46'; Golebiowski 59', 71'; Garriock 60', 78', 89'

Belconnen Soccer Centre
Attendance: 600
Referee: Rajendra Singh (Fiji)

11 April 2003

Papua New Guinea	0–5	New Zealand
		Smith 7'; Jackman 12', 47', 59'; Duncan 68'

Belconnen Soccer Centre
Attendance: 250
Referee: Krystyna Szokolai (Australia)
11 April 2003

Cook Islands	0–1	Samoa
		Laumea 77'

Belconnen Soccer Centre
Attendance: 250
Referee: Joakim Salaiau Sosongan (Papua New Guinea)

13 April 2003

Papua New Guinea	5–2	Samoa
Banabas 27', 80'; Matthies 30'; Nombe 51'; Lanta 71'		Talai 74'; Peresia 87'

Belconnen Soccer Centre
Attendance: 550
Referee: Tammy Ogston (Australia)
13 April 2003

Australia	2–0	New Zealand
Peters 24'; Small 49'

Belconnen Soccer Centre
Attendance: 2,200
Referee: Rajendra Singh (Fiji)

== Awards ==
2003 OFC Women's Championship winners

Australia
Third title

== Goalscorers ==
10 goals

- (New Zealand) Maia Jackman

8 goals

- (Australia) April Mann

7 goals

- (New Zealand) Nicky Smith

6 goals

- (Australia) Kelly Golebiowski
- (Australia) Joanne Peters

5 goals

- (New Zealand) Simone Ferrara

4 goals

- (Australia) Heather Garriock
- (Australia) Danielle Small

3 goals

- (Australia) Dianne Alagich
- (Papua New Guinea) Lydia Banabas

2 goals

- (Australia) Hayley Crawford
- (Australia) Rhian Davies
- (Australia) Tal Karp
- (Australia) Cheryl Salisbury
- (Australia) Thea Slatyer
- (Australia) Amy Wilson
- (New Zealand) Michele Keinzley
- (Papua New Guinea) Neilen Limbai
- (Papua New Guinea) Glenda Matthies

1 goal

- (Australia) Olivia Hohnke
- (Australia) Sacha Wainwright
- (Cook Islands) Melanie Rakei
- (New Zealand) Priscilla Duncan
- (New Zealand) Wendi Henderson
- (New Zealand) Terry McCahill
- (New Zealand) Hayley Moorwood
- (New Zealand) Jane Simpson
- (Papua New Guinea) Priscilla Konalalai
- (Papua New Guinea) Miriam Lanta
- (Papua New Guinea) Nakere Nombe
- (Samoa) Lynette Laumea
- (Samoa) Selesitina Peresia
- (Samoa) Leti Tarai
