= List of New Zealand men's national football team managers =

The following is a list of New Zealand men's national football team managers, by order of appointment.

== List of managers ==
The following table provides a summary of the complete record of each New Zealand manager including their progress in both the World Cup, Confederations Cup and the Nations Cup.

Statistics correct as of 16 November 2026

Manager	Tenure	P	W	D	L	GF	GA	GD	Win %	Competitions
(England) Ken Armstrong	1957–1964	9	7	1	1	28	13	+15	77.8	—N/a
(Hungary) Juan Schwanner	1967–1968	7	3	0	4	21	20	+1	42.9	—N/a
(Socialist Federal Republic of Yugoslavia) Ljubiša Broćić (caretaker)	1969	6	1	1	4	4	11	−7	16.7	—N/a
(England) Barrie Truman	1970–1976	31	10	9	12	47	48	−1	32.3	1973 Oceania Cup – winners
(England) Wally Hughes	1977–1978	7	5	1	1	23	4	+19	71.4	—N/a
(England) John Adshead (caretaker)	1979–1982	46	22	11	13	89	53	+36	47.8	1980 Oceania Cup – group stage 1982 World Cup – group stage
(England) Allan Jones	1983–1984	19	10	4	5	27	17	+10	52.6	—N/a
(England) Kevin Fallon	1985–1988	19	10	4	5	27	17	+10	52.6	—N/a
(England) John Adshead (caretaker)	1989-1990	4	1	1	2	5	7	−2	25.0	—N/a
(Scotland) Ian Marshall	1990–1993	16	7	1	8	27	16	+11	43.8	—N/a
(Scotland) Bobby Clark	1994–1995	9	1	2	6	10	22	−12	11.1	1996 Nations Cup – semi-finals
(Scotland) Keith Pritchett	1996–1997	9	2	1	6	7	17	−10	22.2	—N/a
(Republic of Ireland) Joe McGrath	1997–1998	9	3	1	5	13	12	+1	33.3	—N/a
(England) Ken Dugdale	1998–2002	34	15	6	13	55	34	+21	44.1	1998 Nations Cup – winners 1999 Confederations Cup – group stage 2000 Nations Cup – runners-up
(England) Mick Waitt	2002–2004	18	8	1	9	45	29	+16	44.4	2002 Nations Cup – winners 2003 Confederations Cup – group stage 2004 Nations Cup – semi-finals
(New Zealand) Ricki Herbert	2005–2013	60	22	14	24	75	93	−18	36.7	2008 Nations Cup – winners 2009 Confederations Cup – group stage 2010 World Cup – group stage 2012 Nations Cup – semi-finals
(England) Neil Emblen	2014	2	0	1	1	2	4	−2	0.0	—N/a
(England) Anthony Hudson	2014–2017	27	9	7	11	32	29	+3	33.3	2016 Nations Cup – winners 2017 Confederations Cup – group stage
(Switzerland) Fritz Schmid	2018–2019	4	2	0	2	4	4	+0	50.0	—N/a
(New Zealand) Danny Hay	2019–2022	16	8	1	7	25	12	+13	50.0	—N/a
(England) Darren Bazeley	2023–2026	42	16	9	17	82	52	+30	38.1	2024 Nations Cup – winners 2026 World Cup – group stage
(England) Des Buckingham	2027-	0	0	0	0	0	0	+0	—	—N/a
