= Zoe Miller =

Zoe Miller may refer to:

- Zoe Miller (footballer) (born 1975), New Zealand footballer
- Zoe Miller (gymnast) (born 2005), American artistic gymnast
- Zoe Miller (singer), British singer and member of XO
