= Len Barwell =

New Zealand footballer

Personal information
- Full name: Len J Barwell
- Place of birth: New Zealand
- Position: Forward

Senior career*
Years	Team	Apps	(Gls)
- Christchurch Rangers

International career
1922	New Zealand	1	(0)
- * Club domestic league appearances and goals

Len Barwell was an association football player who represented New Zealand at international level.

Barwell made a single appearance in an official international for the All Whites in a 3–1 win over Australia on 8 July 1922
