= Chris Wood (footballer, born 1991) =

New Zealand footballer

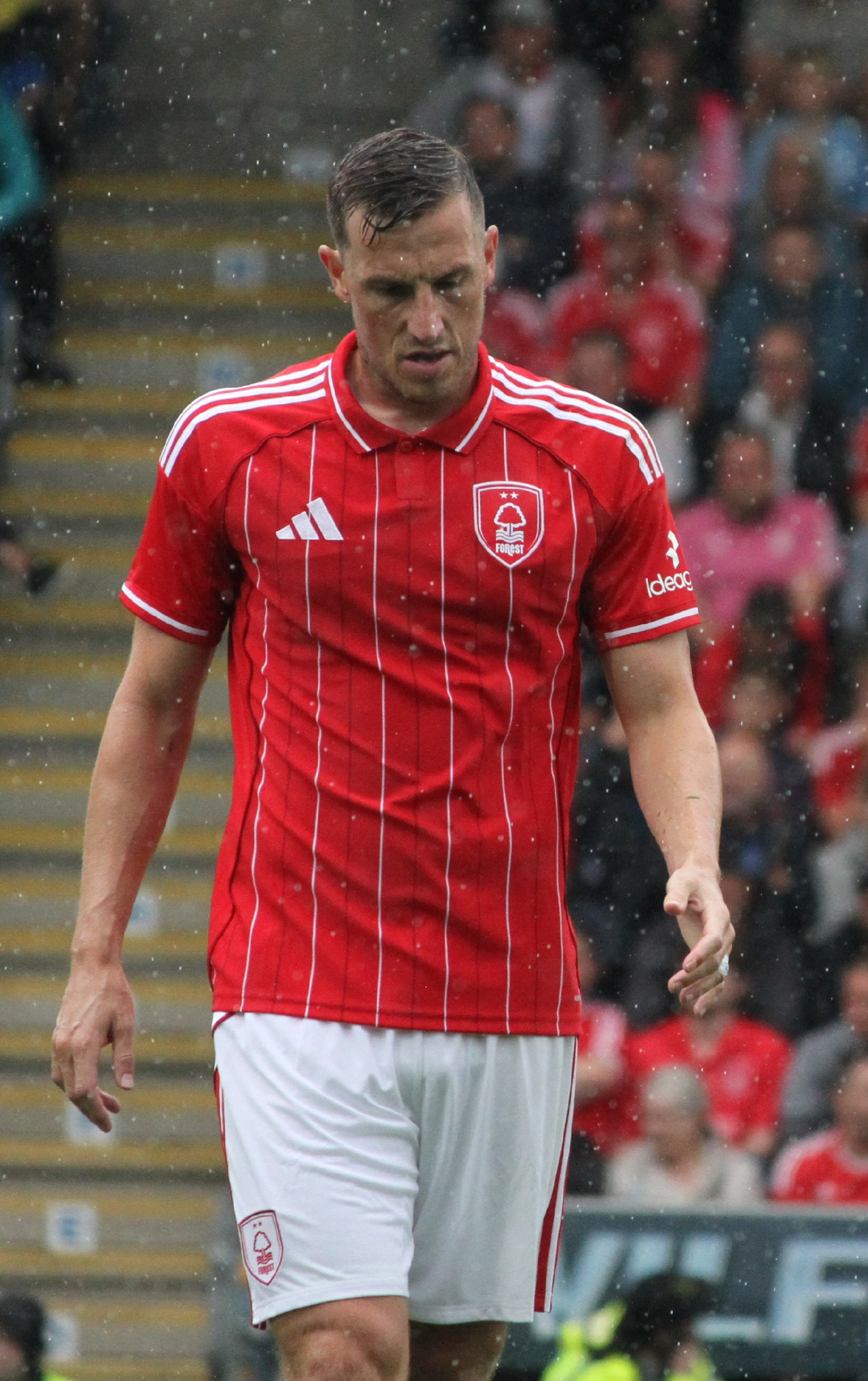
- Wood playing for Nottingham Forest in 2025

Personal information
- Full name: Christopher Grant Wood
- Date of birth: 7 December 1991 (age 34)
- Place of birth: Auckland, New Zealand
- Height: 1.91 m (6 ft 3 in)
- Position: Forward

Team information
- Current team: Nottingham Forest
- Number: 9

Youth career
- –2002: Onehunga Sports
- 2003–2006: Cambridge

Senior career*
Years	Team	Apps	(Gls)
2006	Cambridge		
2007	Hamilton Wanderers	17	(16)
2007–2008	Waikato	5	(0)
2009–2013	West Bromwich Albion	21	(1)
2010	→ Barnsley (loan)	7	(0)
2010–2011	→ Brighton & Hove Albion (loan)	29	(8)
2011–2012	→ Birmingham City (loan)	23	(9)
2012	→ Bristol City (loan)	19	(3)
2012	→ Millwall (loan)	19	(11)
2013	→ Leicester City (loan)	1	(2)
2013–2015	Leicester City	52	(12)
2015	→ Ipswich Town (loan)	8	(0)
2015–2017	Leeds United	83	(41)
2017–2022	Burnley	144	(49)
2022–2023	Newcastle United	35	(4)
2023	→ Nottingham Forest (loan)	7	(1)
2023–	Nottingham Forest	90	(37)

International career^{‡}
2007	New Zealand U17 (Note: Wood's New Zealand Football profile as of 15 August 2012 (after the 2012 Olympics) gave him 3 under-17 appearances without scoring, and 5 under-23 appearances with 1 goal, made up of two warm-up friendlies, and three 2012 Olympics group matches. He was not in the squad for any match between 2012 and 2020 as per the full list of U23 matches at UltimateNZSoccer.com: namely, the 2015 Pacific Games, the 2019 Pacific Games, and the 2019 friendlies against Australia and Olympic qualifiers. In 2021, Wood played in two friendlies against Australia, scoring in the first. At the 2020 Olympics, he played in all three group matches and scored twice. These 5 appearances and 3 goals take his totals to 10 appearances and 4 goals as of the match played on 28 July 2021.)	3	(0)
2012	New Zealand U23	5	(1)
2021	New Zealand Olympic (O.P.)	5	(3)
2009–	New Zealand	97	(47)
Medal record
Men's football
Representing New Zealand
OFC Nations Cup
Winner	2016 Papua New Guinea
Third place	2012 Solomon Islands
- * Club domestic league appearances and goals as of 17:02, 31 October 2026 (UTC) ‡ National team caps and goals as of 19:10, 15 November 2026 (UTC)

Christopher Grant Wood (born 7 December 1991) is a New Zealand professional footballer who plays as a forward for Premier League club Nottingham Forest and captains the New Zealand national team. Widely regarded as the greatest ever footballer to come out of New Zealand, Wood is one of just six New Zealanders to have played in the Premier League.

Wood started his senior career with Cambridge, Waikato and Hamilton Wanderers before moving to England to play for Premier League club West Bromwich Albion. He spent his time on loan at six clubs before joining Leicester City in 2013. After a loan spell with Ipswich Town in 2015, he signed for Championship club Leeds United, where he became the top scorer in the 2016–17 season, with 27 goals. Wood then joined Burnley for a club record fee, and became a consistent goalscorer for them in the Premier League, notching up 49 goals in 144 matches over four and a half seasons. In January 2022, he joined Newcastle United for £25 million (€29 million), making him the most expensive Oceania player of all time.

After joining Nottingham Forest in 2023, Wood went on to become the club's all-time leading Premier League goalscorer, surpassing Bryan Roy's long-standing record of 24 goals. During the 2024–25 Premier League season, Wood equalled his career-best goal tally by mid-January, having scored 14 goals in 22 matches. He later went on to finish the campaign with 20 Premier League goals, the first time he had reached that milestone in a single season.

Wood has earned over 90 caps for the New Zealand national team, making him the country's record appearance holder, while his 47 international goals also make him their all-time leading goalscorer. He ranks second among all New Zealand internationals, male or female, for international goals, behind only Amber Hearn. Wood represented New Zealand at the FIFA World Cup in 2010 and 2026, and was a member of the squad that won the 2016 OFC Nations Cup.

== Early and personal life ==
Wood was born in Auckland to Grant and Julie Wood; his mother is from England. Wood began his footballing career at Onehunga Sports; after moving to Hamilton aged 11, he attended St Paul's Collegiate School.

Wood's sister, Chelsey Wood, is also a footballer, and has represented New Zealand at under-20 level.

In June 2024, Wood married his long-term partner Emma Lovell, a solicitor. In October 2024, Wood revealed that he and his wife are expecting a baby girl, Wood's first child.

== Club career ==
=== Early career ===
Wood began his senior career with Cambridge, scoring on his debut in the NRFL Division 2 in 2006 aged just 14, and after a spell at local rivals Hamilton Wanderers the following season in the NRFL Premier, he attracted the attention of ASB Premiership club Waikato.

=== West Bromwich Albion ===
Wood was recommended to West Bromwich Albion's Academy by coach Roger Wilkinson, who set up a trial for him. He found a rich vein of goal scoring form for West Brom's youth academy side, leading to a call-up to the reserve team where he was just as prolific. Injuries to several West Brom players saw Wood handed a surprise call up to the first-team for a Premier League match against Portsmouth at Fratton Park in April 2009. He came on as a substitute to become just the fifth New Zealander to play in the Premier League.

At the end of the 2008–09 season, Wood signed his first professional contract, of two years with a further two-year option in the club's favour. This was followed in December 2009 with a new three-and-a-half-year deal, with West Brom having the option to extend that for a further year. He scored his first professional goal for West Brom on 15 September 2009, a "stunning" 25-yard strike into the top left corner, in a 3–1 win over Doncaster Rovers.

==== Loan spells ====
Wood was sent out on a 93-day emergency loan to Barnsley on 24 September 2010. The loan was terminated early by mutual consent after seven league appearances for the club without scoring.

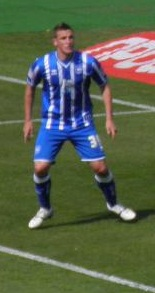
Wood playing for Brighton & Hove Albion in 2011

On 19 November, Wood signed for Brighton & Hove Albion on loan until January 2011. He scored on his debut against Bristol Rovers but saw a penalty saved just days later against Southampton. He added to his scoring tally in the 3–1 FA Cup win over Portsmouth, and scored twice against Peterborough United.

The day before the first match of the Championship season, Wood joined Birmingham City on a one-month loan. He made his debut the following day, replacing Keith Fahey in the second half of a 2–1 defeat at Derby County. Playing as the lone striker in Birmingham's first match in major European competition for nearly 50 years, the Europa League play-off round first leg against Portuguese club Nacional, Wood hit the frame of the goal twice. The game finished goalless. He scored his first goal for Birmingham in the second leg of the tie against Nacional. On 11 September, Wood scored a hat-trick to lead Birmingham to victory over Millwall, followed by two goals against Nottingham Forest on 2 October to take his league total to seven goals from eight games. His loan was then extended for a second time, until 5 January 2012. His eighth, to clinch a 2–0 win over Leicester City, came when Marlon King played a cross-field ball for Wood to run on to and, according to The Independent, "the composure he revealed to go past Kasper Schmeichel and slot the ball home from an angle was impressive". Four days later, Wood scored in the 10th minute of stoppage time to defeat Club Brugge 2–1 in the Europa League group stage. His loan ended on 5 January 2012, after 29 games in all competitions from which he scored 11 goals.

After returning to West Bromwich Albion as an unused substitute in their third round FA Cup tie against Cardiff City, Wood joined Championship club Bristol City on loan until the end of the 2011–12 season. He scored three goals during his loan spell with the club, his first goal coming on his home debut in a 2–1 win over Doncaster Rovers on 21 January. His other two goals came in back to back matches, one against Nottingham Forest on 7 April, where it was the only goal of the game, and then two days later at home to Coventry City in a 3–1 win.

On 17 September 2012, Wood completed a two-month loan deal to Championship side Millwall. He made his Millwall debut as a substitute for Darius Henderson against Cardiff City, and on his first start, scored a consolation goal against his former club Brighton & Hove Albion. On 18 November, Wood extended his loan until January 2013, and scored the winner against Leeds United on the same day. On 24 November, he scored the opening goal away to Blackburn Rovers, a powerful shot from 25 yards, helping the visitors to a 2–0 victory.

=== Leicester City ===
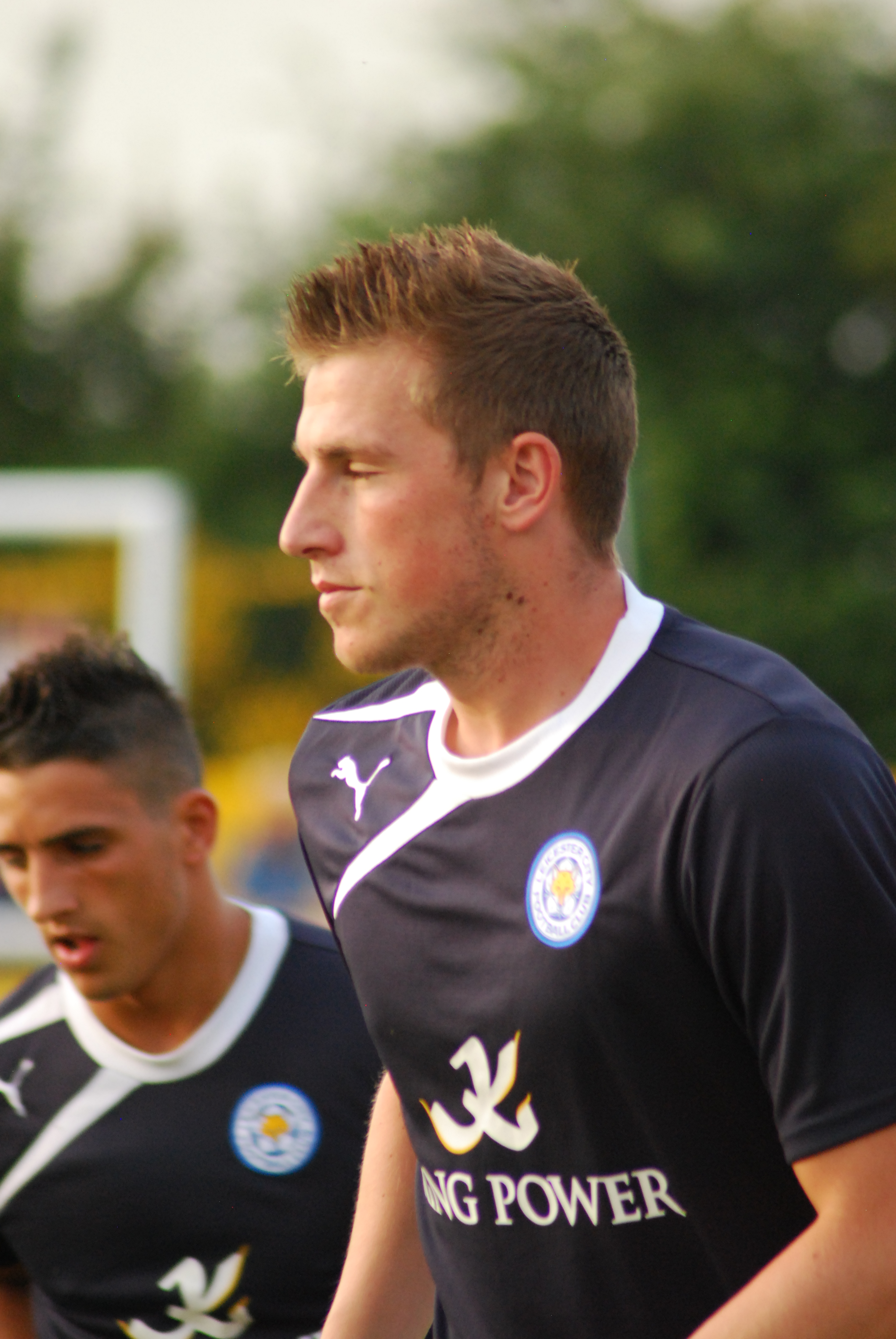
Wood warming up for Leicester City in 2013

West Bromwich Albion recalled Wood from Millwall on 27 December 2012, and announced the following day that they had accepted offers from Millwall and fellow Championship club Leicester City for the permanent transfer of Wood. He chose to join the latter, and the move was expected to be completed when the January 2013 transfer window opens. Leicester confirmed that the player had agreed personal terms. Wood started and scored twice after only 24 minutes in his first game for Leicester on 1 January 2013 against Huddersfield Town, initially joining on loan to be registered in time to play.

On 12 January 2013, Wood scored a first-half hat-trick against Bristol City at Ashton Gate to take his goal tally to six goals in three games for Leicester. He finished the regular season with 11 goals in 24 appearances, helping Leicester qualify for the Championship play-offs. On 12 May 2013, Wood played in the semi-final second leg against Watford but the team were knocked out by the opposition 3–2 on aggregate.

On 26 March 2014, TV footage appeared to support Leicester goalkeeper Kasper Schmeichel's claim that he had scored what would have been the first goal of his career, when Leicester equalised in injury time against Yeovil Town. However, the match officials ruled that his header had not crossed the line, and the goal was officially credited to Wood, who followed up to put the ball in the net. Five days later, after replacing Jamie Vardy as a substitute, Wood scored a "stunning" long-range volley against Burnley to put Leicester six points clear at the top of the Championship. Wood finished the season with 8 goals in all competitions as Leicester were promoted to the Premier League at the end of the season as champions.

On 16 August 2014, he came on for Leonardo Ulloa after 78 minutes of Leicester's first match of the Premier League season, at home to Everton. Seven minutes later he scored the equaliser in a 2–2 draw.

On 27 February 2015, Wood joined Ipswich Town on loan until the end of the season. He made his debut for Ipswich against Norwich City on 1 March, playing eight matches for them without scoring. However, on 25 April, he was recalled by his parent club during their successful fight to avoid relegation from the Premier League.

=== Leeds United ===
On 1 July 2015, Wood joined Championship club Leeds United on a four-year contract for an undisclosed fee, reported to be in the range of £2.5–3 million. As a result, he became Leeds' most expensive signing since the arrival of Nick Barmby in August 2002. Wood was given the number 9 shirt for the coming season. On 8 August, the opening day of the season, Wood made his debut for Leeds in the Championship in a 1–1 draw against Burnley. Four days later, Wood missed his attempt in a penalty shoot-out against Doncaster Rovers in the League Cup, with Leeds losing the shoot-out 4–2 after a 1–1 draw. Wood scored his first goal for Leeds on 19 August in a 2–2 draw with Bristol City. Near the end of the season, he scored his 13th goal of the season on 7 May 2016 against Preston North End in a 1–1 draw to finish as his club's top goal scorer for the 2015–16 season.

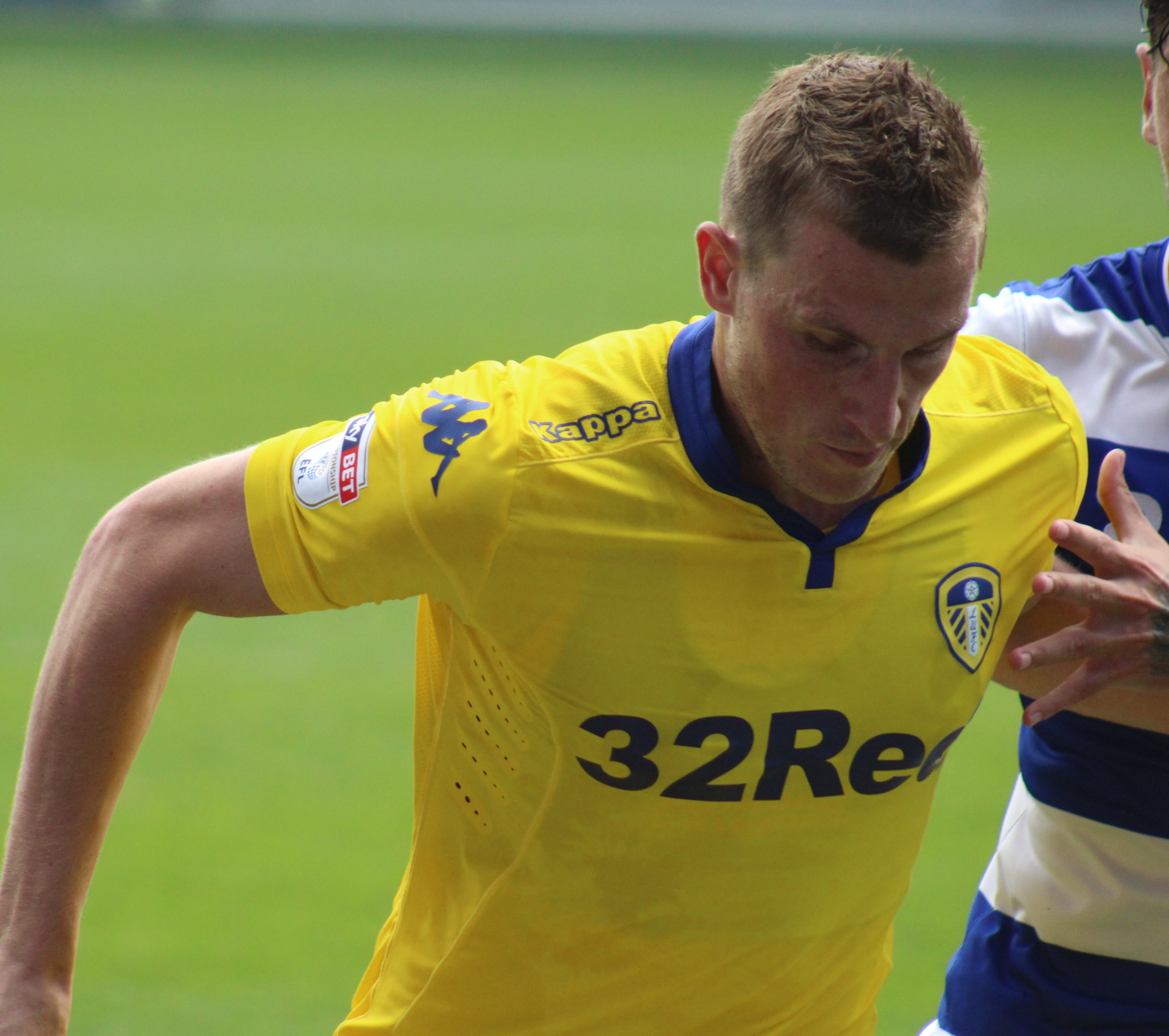
Wood playing for Leeds United in 2016

Wood scored his first goal of the following season on 10 August 2016, in their League Cup fixture against Fleetwood Town, and his first league goal was an injury-time equaliser a week later with a bicycle kick in a 1–1 draw with Fulham. He scored again in the next match, as Leeds beat Sheffield Wednesday 2–0, and by the end of September had seven goals in all competitions. His ninth goal of the season came in extra time of the League Cup fourth-round tie against Norwich to make the score 2–2, and he converted his kick as Leeds won in a penalty shoot-out. He opened the scoring against Reading in mid-December, but had to leave the field in the first half with what proved to be a minor hamstring injury.

Wood's 16th goal of the season, in a 1–0 win against Derby County on 13 January, sent Leeds third in the Championship table. A week later, he scored twice in a 3–2 defeat against Barnsley; this was the first time that Leeds had lost a match in which Wood had scored. He reached 20 for the season on 25 January in a 2–0 win over Nottingham Forest that returned Leeds to third in the table, and continued to score regularly, although Leeds were unable to maintain their playoff position. His last goal of the season, a penalty to equalise in a 1–1 draw with Wigan Athletic, took him to 30 goals in all competitions, and his 27 in the league made him the Championship top scorer.

Wood won the EFL Championship Player of the Month award for January 2017, and was voted PFA Fans' Championship Player of the Month for both January and March. He was shortlisted for Championship Player of the Season, but lost out to Brighton's Anthony Knockaert. Wood and teammate Pontus Jansson were named in the EFL Championship Team of the Season and the EFL (all divisions) Team of the Season, and Wood was the only Leeds player selected for the PFA Championship Team of the Year. At club level, he won Leeds United's Player of the Year and Players' Player of the Year awards for 2016–17.

On 6 August 2017, Wood scored his first goal of the season in the 3–2 victory against Bolton Wanderers. On 18 August, after the club had rejected a £12 million offer from Premier League club Burnley earlier in the week, Leeds offered Wood a new three-year contract in an attempt to keep him at the club. In the expectation of a further, successful, bid, he ruled himself out of the match against Sunderland on 19 August.

=== Burnley ===
On 21 August 2017, Wood signed a four-year contract with Premier League club Burnley for an undisclosed club-record fee, widely reported as £15 million. Wood made his Burnley debut on 27 August against Tottenham Hotspur at Wembley Stadium in the Premier League, and scored an equaliser in the second minute of stoppage time in a match which finished 1–1.

On 19 September, in the EFL Cup third round, Wood scored against his former club Leeds United at Turf Moor in the 89th minute from the penalty spot. The match ended 2–2 after extra time, and Leeds won the match 5–3 on penalties. On 8 November 2019, Wood signed a new contract committing himself to Burnley until 2023.

Wood scored in the final match of the 2019–20 season in Burnley's 2–1 defeat to Brighton on 26 July 2020. It was his 14th goal of the season, both his highest return in the Premier League and best scoring season overall in a Burnley shirt.

On 6 March 2021, Wood scored his 40th goal in the Premier League in a 1–1 draw against Arsenal, as well as becoming the eighth player in the history of the club to start 100 Premier League games for Burnley. On 25 April, he scored his first hat-trick for Burnley in a 4–0 away league win against Wolverhampton Wanderers, becoming the first New Zealander to score three goals in a Premier League match.

=== Newcastle United ===
On 13 January 2022, Wood signed a two-and-a-half-year contract with Newcastle United for a fee reported to be £25 million, after his release clause was triggered. Newcastle manager Eddie Howe said that Wood was an important signing at a crucial time of the season. Wood himself saw the move as an "exciting opportunity" after becoming the club's second signing since the takeover from a Saudi-backed consortium. He made his Newcastle debut two days after signing when he started in a 1–1 draw against Watford, and his first goal for the club was the equaliser in a 2–1 league win over Southampton on 10 March.

=== Nottingham Forest ===
Wood found his first-team chances at Newcastle limited, and on 20 January 2023, he joined Premier League club Nottingham Forest on loan to the end of the season. The deal included an obligation to buy should certain conditions be met. His first goal, an 84th-minute tap-in, earned Forest a draw at home to Manchester City on 18 February. On 30 March 2023, the club announced Wood would miss the rest of the season with a thigh injury.

In June 2023, his transfer to Nottingham Forest became permanent, for a reported fee of £15 million. Later that year, on 26 December, he scored a hat-trick in a 3–1 away victory over Newcastle United, becoming only the fourth player in Premier League history to achieve this feat against his former club following Andy Cole, Marcus Bent and Joshua King. In the 2023–24 season, Wood was Nottingham Forest's top goalscorer, with 15 goals in 35 appearances across all competitions.

Wood was named the Premier League Player of the Month for October 2024, as the league's top scorer for the month with four goals in his three appearances. He became the first Nottingham Forest player and first New Zealander to win the award. On 7 December 2024, he became Forest's top leading goalscorer in the Premier League, bypassing Bryan Roy, as he netted the winner in a 3–2 away victory over Manchester United. The goal was Wood's 25th for the club, and secured Forest's first win at Old Trafford since a 2–1 triumph on 17 December 1994.

In January 2025, Wood signed a new deal with the club, extending his contract to 2027. On 1 February, he netted a hat-trick, the third goal of which was a penalty, in a 7–0 victory over Brighton, becoming the first Nottingham Forest player to achieve this feat at the City Ground in the top flight since Nigel Clough in December 1987. Wood scored his 20th goal of the season on 11 May during a 2–2 draw against his former club Leicester City, which secured Forest's qualification for European competitions for the first time in 30 years. In addition, he became the second Forest player to reach 20 Premier League goals in one season, following Stan Collymore in 1994–95. At the end of the 2024–25 season, Wood was voted into the PFA Team of the Year by his fellow Premier League players. In October 2025, it was reported that Wood had sustained a knee injury that would see him out of action until March 2026, with surgery later performed in December 2025. On 9 April 2026, Wood returned to action, starting in a 1–1 away draw with Porto in the Europa League quarter-final.

== International career ==
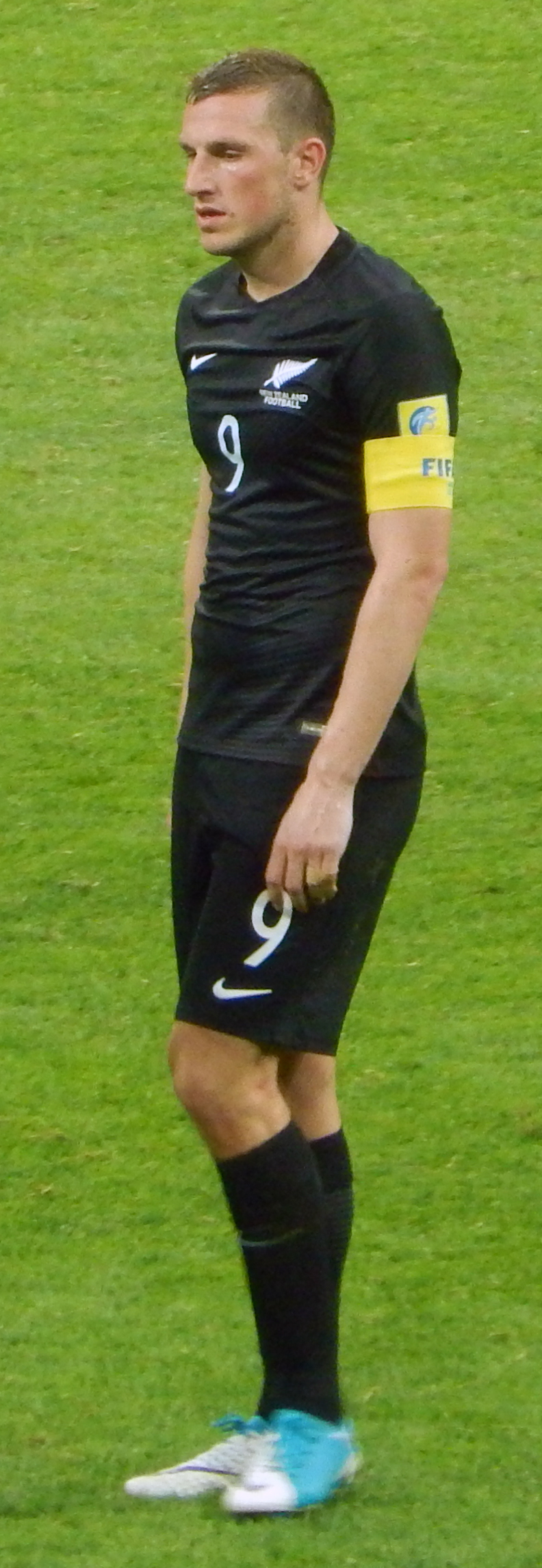
Wood playing for New Zealand at the 2017 FIFA Confederations Cup

Wood represented New Zealand at under-17 level and was a standout performer for the All Whites at the 2007 FIFA U-17 World Cup, a tournament which earned him a trial with West Brom, for whom he later signed.

After a string of impressive performances at club level, Wood's rise on the international stage continued as he was fast-tracked into All Whites coach Ricki Herbert's squad for the 2009 FIFA Confederations Cup in South Africa. He made his debut in a friendly against Tanzania on 3 June 2009 in a warm-up match for the tournament.

In May 2010, Wood was named in the All Whites World Cup squad for the 2010 FIFA World Cup, and at 18 was the youngest member of the New Zealand team which travelled to South Africa. He came on as a substitute in the first group match in a 1–1 draw against Slovakia as New Zealand claimed their first ever point in a World Cup finals match. He appeared as a substitute in New Zealand's remaining group matches, a 1–1 draw with defending champions Italy and a 0–0 draw with Paraguay, as they were knocked out of the tournament after drawing all three group games.

Wood scored his first international goal on 10 October 2010 in his country's 1–1 draw with Honduras. He was given a yellow card for the unusual nature of his celebration of the goal, where he revealed his underwear to the spectators.

Wood scored his first international hat-trick against Solomon Islands on 10 June 2012 in the third place play-off of the OFC Nations Cup. He was named in the New Zealand under-23 squad for the 2012 Olympics, and scored in a 1–1 draw against Egypt under-23s on 29 July 2012 at Old Trafford. He also started the final group game in a 3–0 defeat to Brazil under-23s which saw the New Zealand Olympic squad knocked out of the tournament.

On 14 November 2014, Wood became the youngest ever captain for the All Whites, a record previously held by Tommy Smith.

He scored four goals in the 2016 OFC Nations Cup for New Zealand, helping them win the tournament and to qualify for the Confederations Cup.

With Wood being his country's vice-captain, in the absence of captain Winston Reid, he captained his country twice during November 2016, both against New Caledonia, first in a 3–0 victory on 12 November, and then in a 0–0 draw three days later. After being selected as captain for the 2017 FIFA Confederations Cup, Wood scored his only goal of the tournament on 21 June in a 2–1 defeat against Mexico.

Wood was named as one of the three overage players to participate in the 2020 Summer Olympics in Tokyo, Japan.

In March 2022, after scoring twice during New Zealand's 4–0 win over Fiji at the 2022 FIFA World Cup qualifiers in Qatar, Wood became the men's leading goal scorer with 30 goals, overtaking the previous record of 29, held by Vaughan Coveny since 25 May 2006.

On 14 May 2026, Wood was named in the 26-man squad for the 2026 FIFA World Cup. A month later, on 2 June, he earned his 89th international cap in a 4–0 friendly defeat to Haiti, becoming his country's all-time appearance record holder, surpassing previous record of Ivan Vicelich. He provided two assists for Elijah Just as his team began their World Cup campaign with a 2–2 draw against Iran, marking the first instance of a player providing multiple assists in a World Cup match for New Zealand.

== Career statistics ==
=== Club ===
As of match played 31 October 2026

Appearances and goals by club, season and competition
Club	Season	League			FA Cup		League Cup		Other		Total	
Club	Season	Division	Apps	Goals	Apps	Goals	Apps	Goals	Apps	Goals	Apps	Goals
Hamilton Wanderers	2007	NRFL Premier	17	16	—		—		—		17	16
Waikato FC	2007–08	NZ Premiership	5	0	— (Note: As a franchise team, Waikato FC were ineligible to play in the Chatham Cup, New Zealand's national knockout cup competition.)		—		—		5	0
West Bromwich Albion	2008–09	Premier League	2	0	0	0	0	0	—		2	0
West Bromwich Albion	2009–10	Championship	18	1	2	1	3	0	—		23	2
West Bromwich Albion	2010–11	Premier League	1	0	—		1	1	—		2	1
West Bromwich Albion	Total		21	1	2	1	4	1	0	0	27	3
Barnsley (loan)	2010–11	Championship	7	0	—		—		—		7	0
Brighton & Hove Albion (loan)	2010–11	League One	29	8	2	1	—		—		31	9
Birmingham City (loan)	2011–12	Championship	23	9	—		0	0	6 (Note: Appearances in UEFA Europa League)	2	29	11
Bristol City (loan)	2011–12	Championship	19	3	—		—		—		19	3
Millwall (loan)	2012–13	Championship	19	11	—		—		—		19	11
Leicester City	2012–13	Championship	20	9	2	2	—		2 (Note: Appearances in Championship play-offs)	0	24	11
Leicester City	2013–14	Championship	26	4	0	0	3	4	—		29	8
Leicester City	2014–15	Premier League	7	1	1	0	1	0	—		9	1
Leicester City	Total		53	14	3	2	4	4	2	0	62	20
Ipswich Town (loan)	2014–15	Championship	8	0	—		—		—		8	0
Leeds United	2015–16	Championship	36	13	0	0	1	0	—		37	13
Leeds United	2016–17	Championship	44	27	0	0	4	3	—		48	30
Leeds United	2017–18	Championship	3	1	—		0	0	—		3	1
Leeds United	Total		83	41	0	0	5	3	0	0	88	44
Burnley	2017–18	Premier League	24	10	0	0	2	1	—		26	11
Burnley	2018–19	Premier League	38	10	2	1	1	0	5	2	46	13
Burnley	2019–20	Premier League	32	14	2	0	1	0	—		35	14
Burnley	2020–21	Premier League	33	12	1	0	3	0	—		37	12
Burnley	2021–22	Premier League	17	3	1	0	3	0	—		21	3
Burnley	Total		144	49	6	1	10	1	5	2	165	53
Newcastle United	2021–22	Premier League	17	2	—		—		—		17	2
Newcastle United	2022–23	Premier League	18	2	1	0	3	1	—		22	3
Newcastle United	Total		35	4	1	0	3	1	0	0	39	5
Nottingham Forest (loan)	2022–23	Premier League	7	1	—		—		—		7	1
Nottingham Forest	2023–24	Premier League	31	14	3	1	1	0	—		35	15
Nottingham Forest	2024–25	Premier League	36	20	4	0	0	0	—		40	20
Nottingham Forest	2025–26	Premier League	15	3	0	0	0	0	5	2	20	5
Nottingham Forest	2026–27	Premier League	8	0	0	0	1	0	—		9	0
Nottingham Forest	Total		97	38	7	1	2	0	5	2	111	41
Career total			560	194	21	6	28	10	18	6	627	216

=== International ===
As of match played 15 November 2026

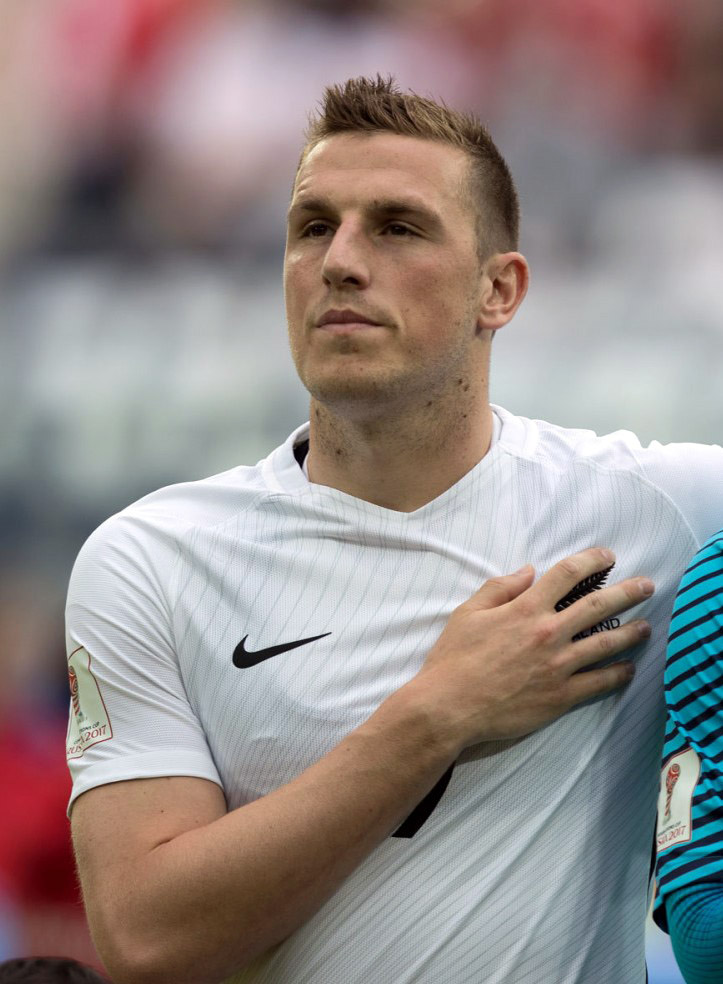
Wood lining up for New Zealand in 2017

Appearances and goals by national team and year
National team	Year	Apps	Goals
New Zealand U17	2007	3	0
New Zealand U23	2012	5	1
NZ Olympic (O.P.)	2021	5	3
NZ Olympic (O.P.)	Total	10	4
New Zealand	2009	5	0
New Zealand	2010	9	1
New Zealand	2011	3	0
New Zealand	2012	12	9
New Zealand	2013	4	0
New Zealand	2014	4	3
New Zealand	2015	2	1
New Zealand	2016	7	4
New Zealand	2017	10	6
New Zealand	2018	0	0
New Zealand	2019	1	0
New Zealand	2020	0	0
New Zealand	2021	3	3
New Zealand	2022	10	6
New Zealand	2023	4	1
New Zealand	2024	6	7
New Zealand	2025	8	4
New Zealand	2026	9	2
New Zealand	Total	97	47
Career total		110	51

== Honours ==
West Bromwich Albion

- Football League Championship runner-up: 2009–10

Brighton & Hove Albion

- Football League One: 2010–11

Leicester City

- Football League Championship: 2013–14

New Zealand

- OFC Nations Cup: 2016; third place: 2012

Individual

- New Zealand U-20 Men's Player of the Year: 2008, 2009, 2011
- IFFHS OFC Best Man Player of the Decade 2011–2020
- Premier League Player of the Month: October 2024
- EFL Team of the Season: 2016–17
- EFL Championship Golden Boot: 2016–17
- Football League Championship Player of the Month: January 2017
- PFA Team of the Year: 2016–17 Championship, 2024–25 Premier League
- PFA Premier League Fans' Player of the Month: October 2024
- Leeds United Player of the Year: 2016–17
- IFFHS OFC Men's Team of the Decade 2011–2020
- IFFHS Oceania Men's Team of All Time: 2021
- Burnley Player of the Year: 2020–21
- New Zealand Football Awards (Player of the Year): 2016, 2017, 2018, 2019, 2021
- New Zealand Football Awards (International player of the Year): 2019, 2021, 2023
- Premier League Fan Team of the Season: 2024–25
- The Athletic Premier League Team of the Season: 2024–25

== See also ==
- List of top international men's football goal scorers by country
