= Jo Nicholson =

New Zealand footballer

Personal information
- Full name: Jo Nicholson
- Date of birth: 1 April 1957 (age 69)

International career
Years	Team	Apps	(Gls)
1979–1986	New Zealand	5	(0)

Jo Nicholson (born 1 April 1957) is a former association football player who represented New Zealand at international level.

Nicholson made her Football Ferns début in a 2–2 draw with Australia on 8 October 1979, and finished her international career with five caps to her credit.
