= Melissa Wileman =

New Zealand footballer

Personal information
- Full name: Melissa Wileman
- Date of birth: 4 August 1972 (age 54)
- Place of birth: New Zealand

International career
Years	Team	Apps	(Gls)
1995–1998	New Zealand	10	(0)

Melissa Wileman (née Verryt) (born 4 August 1972) is an association football player who represented New Zealand at international level.

Fisher made her Football Ferns début in a 0–0 draw with Korea Republic on 10 September 1995, and finished her international career with 10 caps to her credit.
