= Carol Waller =

New Zealand footballer

Personal information
- Full name: Carol Waller
- Date of birth: 20 September 1949 (age 77)
- Place of birth: New Zealand
- Position: Goalkeeper

International career
Years	Team	Apps	(Gls)
1975	New Zealand	4	(0)

Carol Waller (born 20 September 1949 in New Zealand) is a former association football player who represented New Zealand at international level.

Waller made her Football Ferns debut in their first ever international as they beat Hong Kong 2–0 on 25 August 1975 at the inaugural AFC Women's Asian Cup. She finished her international career with 4 caps to her credit.

== Honours ==
New Zealand

- AFC Women's Championship: 1975
