= Rebecca Simpson =

New Zealand footballer

Personal information
- Full name: Rebecca Simpson
- Date of birth: 2 December 1982 (age 43)

International career
| Years | Team | Apps | (Gls) |
| 2004–2007 | New Zealand | 7 | (0) |

Rebecca Simpson (born 2 December 1982) is an association football player who represented New Zealand at international level.

Simpson made her Football Ferns début in a 0–2 loss to Australia on 18 February 2004, and finished her international career with seven caps to her credit.
