= Andrea Rogers =

New Zealand footballer

Personal information
- Full name: Andrea Rogers
- Place of birth: New Zealand
- Height: 1.65 m (5 ft 5 in)
- Positions: Midfielder; left wing-back

Senior career*
| Years | Team | Apps | (Gls) |
- Western United
- Claudelands Rovers
- Arsenal
- Claudelands Rovers
- Melville United
- Claudelands Rovers
- Hillcrest United
- Cambridge FC
- West Hamilton United
- Ngaruawahia United
- Melville United

International career
| 1994–1997 | New Zealand | 13 | (0) |
- * Club domestic league appearances and goals

Andrea Rogers is a former association football player who represented New Zealand at international level.

Rogers spent her early years playing in Hamilton New Zealand with Western United and Claudelands Rovers before moving to England where she played for Arsenal L.F.C. for one year. On her return to New Zealand in 2001 she played for Claudelands Rovers. then retired in 2003.

She came out of retirement in 2005 to join an 'oldies' team at Rovers, then returned to their Northern League side for a few years. After two seasons with Hillcrest United (in a specially formed 'oldies' team) Rogers joined Waikato club Cambridge FC in 2014, winning the club's Coaches' Player of the Year and Player's Player of the Year (jointly with Jen Hull) awards in her first season. In 2017, Rogers was named Cambridge FC's women's Player of the Year. She then moved to Ngaruawahia United for a few years and is currently with Melville United, and can still be seen playing first team football, when needed.

Rogers made her Football Ferns début in a 0–1 loss to Bulgaria on 24 August 1994, and finished her international career with 13 caps to her credit.
