= Rebecca van der Vegt =

New Zealand footballer

Personal information
- Full name: Rebecca van der Vegt
- Date of birth: 10 April 1964 (age 62)

International career
Years	Team	Apps	(Gls)
1981	New Zealand	8	(0)

Rebecca van der Vegt (born 10 April 1964) is a former association football player who represented New Zealand at international level.

Van der Vegt made her Football Ferns début in a 1–2 loss to Australia on 4 October 1981, and finished her international career with eight caps to her credit.
