= Pam Yates =

New Zealand footballer

Personal information
- Full name: Pamela Yates
- Date of birth: 26 August 1981 (age 45)
- Place of birth: New Zealand
- Position: Goalkeeper

International career
Years	Team	Apps	(Gls)
2004–2005	New Zealand	3	(0)

Pam Yates (born 26 August 1981) is a former association football goalkeeper who represented New Zealand at international level.

Yates made her Football Ferns début in a 0–5 loss to United States on 3 October 2004, and finished her international career with three caps to her credit.
