= Zarnia Cogle =

New Zealand footballer

Personal information
- Full name: Zarnia Cogle
- Date of birth: 10 May 1976 (age 50)
- Place of birth: Christchurch, New Zealand

International career
Years	Team	Apps	(Gls)
2000–2004	New Zealand	18	(0)

Zarnia Cogle (born 10 May 1976 in Christchurch, New Zealand) is an association football player who represented New Zealand at international level.

Cogle made her Football Ferns debut in a 1–2 loss to Canada on 31 May 2000, and finished her international career with 18 caps to her credit.
