= Nell Jongeneel =

New Zealand footballer (born 1956)

Personal information
- Full name: Nell Jongeneel
- Date of birth: 12 October 1956 (age 70)
- Place of birth: Montfoort, The Netherlands
- Position: Centre back

International career
Years	Team	Apps	(Gls)
1975	New Zealand	4	(0)

Nell Jongeneel (born 12 October 1956) is a former association football player who represented New Zealand at international level.

Jongeneel made her Football Ferns debut in their first ever international as they beat Hong Kong 2–0 on 25 August 1975 at the inaugural AFC Women's Asian Cup. She finished her international career with 4 caps to her credit.

== Honours ==
New Zealand

- AFC Women's Championship: 1975
