= Anne Ormrod =

New Zealand footballer (born 1987)

Personal information
- Full name: Anne Ormrod
- Date of birth: 17 August 1987 (age 39)

International career
Years	Team	Apps	(Gls)
2004	New Zealand	2	(0)

Anne Ormrod (born 17 August 1987) is a former association football player who represented New Zealand at international level.

Ormrod made her Football Ferns début in a 0–5 loss to United States on 3 October 2004, and made just one further appearance, in a 0–6 loss also to United States, a week later.
