= Adrienne Bain =

New Zealand footballer

Personal information
- Full name: Adrienne Bain

International career
Years	Team	Apps	(Gls)
1995	New Zealand	1	(0)

Adrienne Bain is a former association football player who represented New Zealand at international level.

Bain made a single appearance for the Football Ferns in a 0–0 draw with Korea Republic on 10 September 1995.
