= Liz O'Meara =

New Zealand footballer

Personal information
- Full name: Elizabeth O'Meara
- Date of birth: 19 October 1982 (age 44)
- Position: Striker

International career
Years	Team	Apps	(Gls)
2003	New Zealand	1	(0)

Elizabeth O'Meara (born 19 October 1982) is a former association football player who represented New Zealand at international level.

O'Meara made a single appearance for the Football Ferns in a 9–0 win over Cook Islands on 9 April 2003.
