= Sue Gregory =

New Zealand footballer

Personal information
- Full name: Sue Gregory
- Date of birth: 27 July 1971 (age 55)

International career
| Years | Team | Apps | (Gls) |
| 1993–1996 | New Zealand | 7 | (1) |

Sue Gregory (also known as Sue Taylor) (born 27 July 1971) is a former association football player who represented New Zealand at international level.

Gregory made her Football Ferns début in a 7–0 win over Trinidad & Tobago on 8 August 1993, and finished her international career with seven caps to her credit.
