= Fiona Roberts =

New Zealand footballer

Personal information
- Full name: Fiona Roberts
- Place of birth: Tamahere, New Zealand

International career
Years	Team	Apps	(Gls)
1994	New Zealand	5	(0)

Fiona Roberts is a former association football player who represented New Zealand at international level.

Roberts made her Football Ferns début in a 0–3 loss to Ghana on 26 August 1994, and her second appearance was in a 0–1 loss to Russia 2 days later.
