= Michelle Redfern =

New Zealand footballer

Personal information
- Full name: Michelle Redfern
- Position: Defender

International career
Years	Team	Apps	(Gls)
1991	New Zealand	1	(0)

Michelle Redfern is a former association football player who represented New Zealand at the international level.

Redfern made a single appearance for Football Ferns in a 2–0 win over Australia on 26 October 1991.
