= Alisse Robertson =

New Zealand footballer

Personal information
- Full name: Alisse Robertson
- Date of birth: 7 January 1978 (age 48)

International career
Years	Team	Apps	(Gls)
2000	New Zealand	1	(0)

Alisse Robertson (born 7 January 1978) is a former association football player who represented New Zealand at the international level.

Robertson made a single appearance for Football Ferns in a 0–5 loss to United States on 4 June 2000.
