= Pauline Sullivan =

New Zealand footballer

Personal information
- Full name: Pauline Sullivan
- Date of birth: 16 September 1963 (age 63)
- Place of birth: New Zealand

International career
Years	Team	Apps	(Gls)
1982–1989	New Zealand	13	(0)

Pauline Sullivan (born 16 September 1963) is an association football player who represented New Zealand at international level.

Sullivan made her Football Ferns début in a 0–2 loss to Taiwan on 7 October 1982, and finished her international career with 13 caps to her credit.
