= Meisha Pyke =

New Zealand footballer

Personal information
- Full name: Meisha Pyke
- Date of birth: 12 October 1982 (age 44)

International career
Years	Team	Apps	(Gls)
2000–2004	New Zealand	5	(0)

Meisha Pyke (born 12 October 1982) is a former association football player who represented New Zealand at international level.

Pyke made her Football Ferns début in a 1–2 loss to Japan on 2 June 2000, and finished her international career with five caps to her credit.
