= Melanie Edwards =

New Zealand footballer

Personal information
- Full name: Melanie Edwards
- Date of birth: 4 January 1973 (age 53)

International career
Years	Team	Apps	(Gls)
2003	New Zealand	2	(0)

Melanie Edwards (born 1 April 1973) is a former association football player who represented New Zealand at international level.

Edwards made her Football Ferns début in a 15-0 World Cup qualifier win over Samoa on 7 April 2003, and made just one further appearance, in a 5–0 win over Papua New Guinea on 11 April that same year.
