= Aaron Clapham =

New Zealand footballer (born 1987)

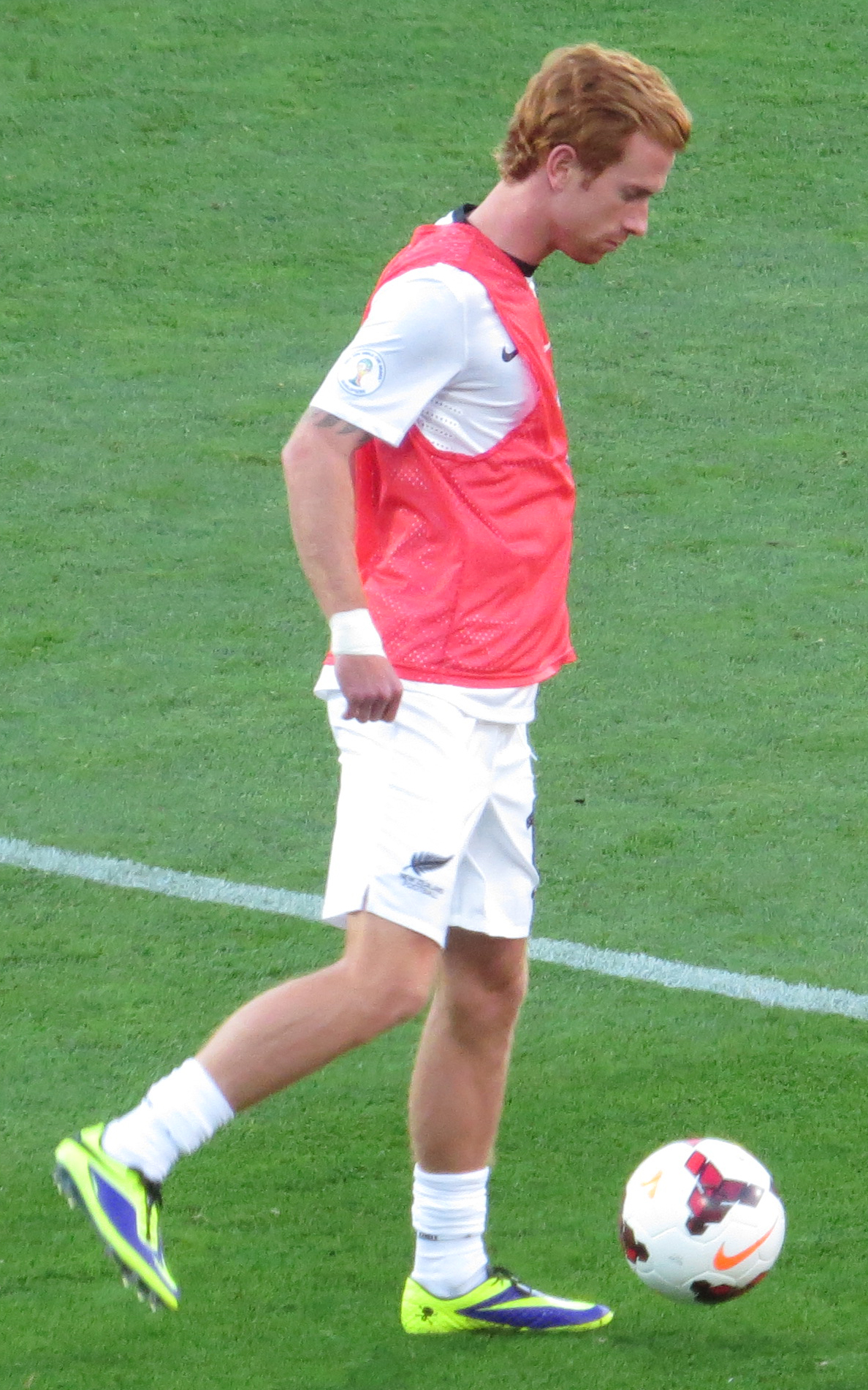
- Clapham warming up with New Zealand in 2013

Personal information
- Full name: Aaron Daniel Clapham
- Date of birth: 15 January 1987 (age 39)
- Place of birth: Christchurch, Canterbury, New Zealand
- Height: 1.74 m (5 ft 9 in)
- Position: Midfielder

Youth career
- 2005–2006: Saint Francis Red Flash
- 2007–2008: Louisville Cardinals

Senior career*
Years	Team	Apps	(Gls)
2009	Dandenong Thunder	10	(0)
2009–2017	Canterbury United	117	(61)
2011	→ Wellington Phoenix (loan)	0	(0)
2013	→ APIA Leichhardt Tigers (loan)	10	(2)
2018–2019	Team Wellington	4	(0)
2019–2020	Canterbury United	21	(4)

International career
2007	New Zealand U-20	8	(0)
2010–2013	New Zealand	13	(0)

Managerial career
- 2020–: New Zealand U-17 (assistant)
- * Club domestic league appearances and goals as of End of Career

Aaron Daniel Clapham (born 15 January 1987) is a former New Zealand footballer and current Football coach. Clapham spent most of his senior footballing career with ISPS Handa Premiership club Canterbury United FC.

== Club career ==
In 2005 Clapham accepted a football scholarship at Saint Francis University, Loretto, Pennsylvania before joining the University of Louisville where he spent 2 seasons, scoring 8 times in 37 appearances. He then moved to Australia, joining Dandenong Thunder in the Victorian Premier League.

Clapham played 117 times for Canterbury United, having scored 61 goals from the centre of midfield. His first goal came in his club's 2–0 victory over Waikato FC on 8 November 2009. Having helped his side to 4th in the New Zealand Football Championship and progressing to the playoff final, he was awarded New Zealand Football Championship Player of the Year for the 2009–10 season.

Clapham has long been considered one of the top players in the New Zealand Football Championship, being named to the league's team of the month in November, December, January, and February during the 2009–10 season. Clapham captained Canterbury United to their highest league position of 2nd place in the 2011–12 season.

On 7 February 2011, he signed a one-game loan deal from Canterbury United to play for Wellington Phoenix in the A-League.

On 2 June 2020, he retired from football, after a final season at Canterbury United Dragons.

== International career ==
Clapham has earned national representation at Under-20 level, where he represented New Zealand at the 2007 FIFA U-20 World Cup in Canada.

After impressing for Canterbury United during the 2009–10 season, Clapham was selected as a part of a 15-man FIFA World Cup training camp for Australia and New Zealand-based players. Following a strong performance for New Zealand 'A' against a NZFC Select XI at the conclusion of the camp on 8 May 2010, Clapham was named as a surprise call-up by All Whites coach Ricki Herbert for New Zealand's 2010 FIFA World Cup campaign.

Clapham made his official international debut on 10 October 2010 when he came on as a late substitute in his country's 1–1 draw with Honduras.

=== International goals and caps ===
New Zealand's goal tally first.

International appearances and goals
#	Date	Venue	Opponent	Result	Competition	Goal	Reference
2010
1	9 October	North Harbour Stadium, Auckland	Honduras	1–1	International Match		
2	12 October	Westpac Stadium, Wellington	Paraguay	0–2	International Match		
2011
3	25 March	Wuhan Sports Center Stadium, Wuhan	China	1–1	International match		
4	1 June	Invesco Field at Mile High, Denver	Mexico	0–3	International match		
5	5 June	Adelaide Oval, Adelaide	Australia	0–3	International Match		
2012
6	26 May	Cotton Bowl Stadium, Dallas	Honduras	1–0	International match		
7	4 June	Lawson Tama Stadium, Honiara	Papua New Guinea	2–1	2012 OFC Nations Cup		
8	6 June	Lawson Tama Stadium, Honiara	Solomon Islands	1–1	2012 OFC Nations Cup		
9	10 June	Lawson Tama Stadium, Honiara	Solomon Islands	4–3	2012 OFC Nations Cup		
2013
10	26 March	Lawson Tama Stadium, Honiara	Solomon Islands	2–0	2014 FIFA World Cup Qualifier		

=== International career statistics ===
New Zealand national team
Year	Apps	Goals
2010	2	0
2011	3	0
2012	4	0
2013	4	0
Total	13	0

== Coaching career ==
Clapham was named on 31 July 2020, as Assistant coach of the New Zealand national under-17 football team.

== Personal life ==
His sister Sara Clapham also represented New Zealand internationally, making 3 appearances for the New Zealand senior women's team.
