= Tina Stevenson =

New Zealand footballer

Personal information
- Full name: Tina Stevenson

International career
Years	Team	Apps	(Gls)
1995	New Zealand	2	(0)

Tina Stevenson is a former association football player who represented New Zealand at international level.

Stevenson made just two appearances for the Football Ferns, both 0-0 draws with Korea Republic, her début on 8 September 1995 and her second appearance 2 days later.
