= Gillian Thurlow =

New Zealand footballer

Personal information
- Full name: Gillian Thurlow

International career
Years	Team	Apps	(Gls)
1994	New Zealand	1	(0)

Gillian Thurlow is a former association football player who represented New Zealand at international level.

Thurlow made a single appearance for Football Ferns in a 2–1 win over Australia on 14 October 1994.
