= Michelle Loos =

New Zealand footballer

Personal information
- Full name: Michelle Loos
- Place of birth: New Zealand

International career
Years	Team	Apps	(Gls)
1980–1983	New Zealand	17	(0)

Michelle Loos is a former association football player who represented New Zealand at international level.

Loos made her Football Ferns as a substitute in a 3–3 draw with Australia on 18 May 1980, and finished her international career with 17 caps to her credit.
