= Tracey Duke =

New Zealand footballer

Personal information
- Full name: Tracey Duke

International career
Years	Team	Apps	(Gls)
1994	New Zealand	2	(0)

Tracey Duke is a former association football player who represented New Zealand at international level.

Duke made her Football Ferns début in a 0–1 loss to Bulgaria on 24 August 1994, and made just one further appearance, in a 0–3 loss to Ghana on 26 August that same year.
