= Julie Hogg =

New Zealand footballer (born 1958)

Personal information
- Full name: Julie Hogg
- Date of birth: 4 November 1958 (age 67)
- Place of birth: New Zealand

International career
Years	Team	Apps	(Gls)
1979–1983	New Zealand	19	(7)

Julie Hogg (née Whitehouse) (born 4 November 1958 in New Zealand) is a former association football player who represented New Zealand at international level.

Hogg made her Football Ferns debut in a 2–2 draw with Australia on 6 October 1979, and finished her international career with 19 caps and 7 goals to her credit.

Hogg continues to be involved in women's international football as team manager at the 2007 FIFA Women's World Cup and the 2008 Olympic Games
