= Tina Salu =

New Zealand footballer

Personal information
- Full name: Tina Salu

International career
Years	Team	Apps	(Gls)
1980–1987	New Zealand	2	(0)

Tina Salu is a former association football player who represented New Zealand at international level.

Salu made her Football Ferns début as a substitute in a 1–1 draw with Ghana on 21 May 1980. She made just one further appearance, also as a substitute, seven years later, in a 1–3 loss to Chinese Taipei on 13 December 1987.
