= Joy Howland =

New Zealand footballer

Personal information
- Full name: Joy Howland
- Date of birth: 21 January 1971 (age 55)

International career
Years	Team	Apps	(Gls)
1996	New Zealand	4	(0)

Joy Howland (born 21 January 1971) is a former association football player who represented New Zealand at international level.

Howland made her Football Ferns début in a 0–0 draw with Korea Republic on 23 March 1986, and finished her international career with four caps to her credit.
