= Lorinda Panther =

New Zealand footballer

Personal information
- Full name: Lorinda Panther
- Date of birth: 15 March 1963 (age 63)
- Place of birth: New Zealand

International career
Years	Team	Apps	(Gls)
1983–1986	New Zealand	14	(0)

Lorinda Panther (née O'Brynne; born 15 March 1963) is an association football player who represented New Zealand at international level.

Panther made her Football Ferns in a 0–0 draw with Australia on 28 November 1983, and finished her international career with 14 caps to her credit.
