= Debbie Mathieson =

New Zealand footballer

Personal information
- Full name: Debbie Mathieson

International career
Years	Team	Apps	(Gls)
1981	New Zealand	2	(0)

Debbie Mathieson is a former association football player who represented New Zealand at an international level.

Mathieson made her Football Ferns début in a 1–2 loss to Australia on 4 October 1981, and made just one further appearance, in a 2–0 win over the Netherlands on 22 October that same year.
