= Michelle Hudson =

New Zealand footballer

Personal information
- Full name: Michelle Hudson

International career
Years	Team	Apps	(Gls)
1983	New Zealand	2	(0)

Michelle Hudson is a former association football player who represented New Zealand at international level.

Hudson made her Football Ferns début in a 6–0 win over New Caledonia on 2 December 1983, and made just one further appearance, in a 3–2 win over Australia on 4 December that same year.
