= Rebecca Roche =

New Zealand footballer

Personal information
- Full name: Rebecca Roche
- Date of birth: 26 April 1965 (age 61)
- Position: Goalkeeper

International career^{‡}
Years	Team	Apps	(Gls)
1987	New Zealand	2	(0)
- ‡ National team caps and goals as of 23 October 2013

Rebecca Roche (born 26 April 1965) is a former association football goalkeeper who represented New Zealand at international level. She made two appearances for the national side, both against Western Samoa in December 1987.
