= Kelly Mawston =

New Zealand footballer

Personal information
- Full name: Kelly Mawston

International career
Years	Team	Apps	(Gls)
1994–1996	New Zealand	6	(0)

Kelly Mawston is a former association football player who represented New Zealand at international level. Kelly Mawston made her Football Ferns début in a 0–1 loss to Bulgaria on 24 August 1994, and finished her international career with six caps to her credit.
