= Hayley Bowden =

New Zealand footballer

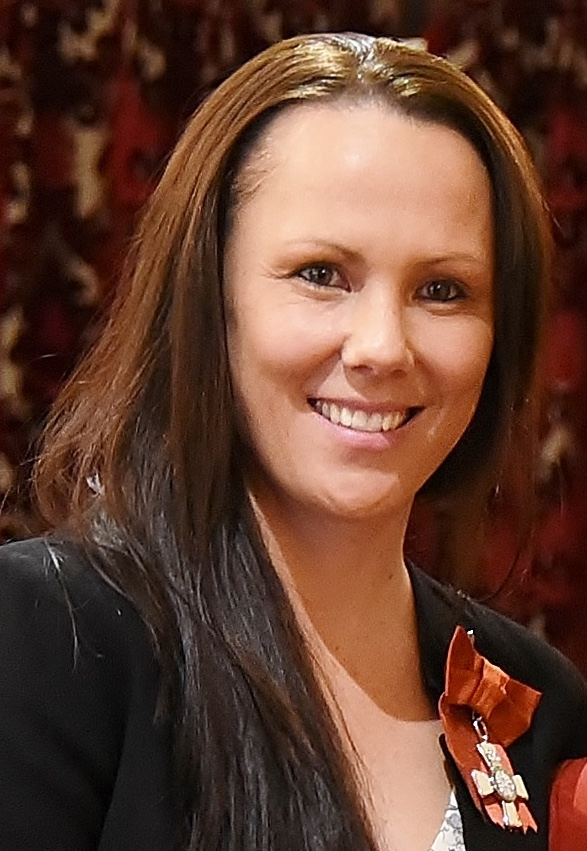
- Bowden in 2017

Personal information
- Birth name: Hayley Rose Moorwood
- Date of birth: 13 February 1984 (age 42)
- Place of birth: Auckland, New Zealand
- Height: 1.64 m (5 ft 5 in)
- Position: Midfielder

College career
Years	Team	Apps	(Gls)
2003–2004	Southwest Baptist Bearcats		
2005	VCU Rams	23	(3)

Senior career*
Years	Team	Apps	(Gls)
–2009	Lynn-Avon United Women		
2009	Ottawa Fury	9	(0)
2010	Fencibles United Women		
2011	Chelsea Ladies	13	(1)
2013–2014	Lincoln Ladies	0	(0)

International career^{‡}
2003–2015	New Zealand	92	(10)
- * Club domestic league appearances and goals ‡ National team caps and goals as of 11 May 2015

Hayley Rose Bowden MNZM (née Moorwood; born 13 February 1984) is a women's association footballer who has represented New Zealand at international level.

== Club career ==
In 2003 and 2004, Bowden played varsity soccer for Southwest Baptist University in Missouri. She represented Virginia Commonwealth University in 2005, scoring three goals in 23 appearances. In 2009, she made nine appearances for Ottawa Fury.

Bowden played most of her club football in New Zealand before signing a one-year deal with Chelsea for the 2011 FA WSL season. In 2013, she joined Lincoln Ladies.

== International career ==
Bowden scored on her Football Ferns debut, a 15–0 victory over Samoa on 7 April 2003, and represented New Zealand at the 2007 FIFA Women's World Cup finals in China, where they lost to Brazil 0–5, Denmark (0–2) and China (0–2).

Bowden was also included in the New Zealand squad for the 2008 Summer Olympics where they drew with Japan (2–2) before losing to Norway (0–1) and Brazil (0–4).

Bowden earned her 50th cap for New Zealand in a 3–0 win over Scotland as they progressed to the Cyprus Cup final on 1 March 2010, becoming only the fourth New Zealand woman to reach the milestone. She went on to surpass Wendi Henderson's record for New Zealand women's international appearances when she earned her 65th cap against Colombia on 19 June 2011. She returned to the national team after giving birth to a son, only to announce her retirement from international football on 11 May 2015. She finished her career with 92 caps and 10 goals for New Zealand.

In the 2016 New Year Honours, Bowden was appointed a Member of the New Zealand Order of Merit for services to football.

== International goals ==
No.	Date	Venue	Opponent	Score	Result	Competition
1.	7 April 2003	Canberra, Australia	Samoa	9–0	15–0	2003 OFC Women's Championship
2.	13 April 2007	Lae, Papua New Guinea	Papua New Guinea	7–0	7–0	2007 OFC Women's Championship
3.	5 March 2008	Sunshine Coast, Australia	Australia	2–1	2–4	Friendly
4.	29 September 2010	Auckland, New Zealand	Vanuatu	4–0	14–0	2010 OFC Women's Championship
5.	29 September 2010	Auckland, New Zealand	Vanuatu	12–0	14–0	2010 OFC Women's Championship
6.	6 October 2010	Auckland, New Zealand	Solomon Islands	3–0	8–0	2010 OFC Women's Championship
10.	4 April 2012	Port Moresby, Papua New Guinea	Papua New Guinea	1–0	7–0	2012 OFC Women's Olympic Qualifying Tournament
11.	24 June 2012	Wollongong, Australia	Australia	1–0	1–1	Friendly

== Personal life ==
Bowden's partner is New Zealand rugby union player Daniel Bowden. She accompanied him when he left New Zealand to join London Irish.

== Honours ==
Individual

- IFFHS OFC Woman Team of the Decade 2011–2020
