= Tina Faichnie =

New Zealand footballer

Personal information
- Full name: Tina Faichnie

International career
| Years | Team | Apps | (Gls) |
| 1979 | New Zealand | 1 | (0) |

Tina Faichnie (also known as Tina Margaretis) is a former association football player who represented New Zealand at international level.

Faichnie made a single appearance for Football Ferns in a 1–0 win over Australia on 8 October 1979.
