= Rowena Fulham =

New Zealand footballer

Personal information
- Full name: Rowena Fulham
- Date of birth: 18 May 1960 (age 66)
- Place of birth: Kaiapoi
- Position: Striker

Senior career*
Years	Team	Apps	(Gls)
- Rangers AFC, New Brighton AFC, Canterbury AFC, NZAFC

International career
1981–1983	New Zealand	7	(4)
- * Club domestic league appearances and goals

Rowena Fulham (née Nutira) (born 18 May 1960) is a former association football player who represented New Zealand at international level and went on to become a renowned coach. Fulham was named coach of the year 3 years running in Canterbury, winning the league, cup double 3 years running. Fulham went on to gain her International coaching license and assisted both Allan Jones with the NZ Senior Women in 2006 and Paul Temple with the U17 at the FIFA U17 World cup hosted in NZ in 2008

Fulham scored on her Football Ferns début with a glancing header from an Ingrid Hall corner, in a 1–2 loss to Australia on 4 October 1981, a warm up match 1 week out from the 1981 Invitational World Cup in Taiwan, and finished her international career with eight caps and four goals to her credit.
