= Zoe Miller (footballer) =

New Zealand footballer

Personal information
- Full name: Zoe Miller
- Date of birth: 17 November 1975 (age 50)

International career
Years	Team	Apps	(Gls)
1994–1995	New Zealand	5	(0)

Zoe Miller (born 17 November 1975) is a former association football player who represented New Zealand at international level.

Miller made her Football Ferns début as a substitute in a 0–1 loss to Bulgaria on 24 August 1994, and finished her international career with five caps to her credit.
