= Ingrid Hall =

New Zealand footballer

Personal information
- Full name: Ingrid Hall
- Place of birth: New Zealand

International career
Years	Team	Apps	(Gls)
1979–1983	New Zealand	17	(1)

Ingrid Hall (née De Meyer) is a former association football player who represented New Zealand at international level.

Hall made her Football Ferns debut in a 0–0 draw with Australia on 8 October 1979, and finished her international career with 17 caps and 1 goal to her credit.
