= Keith Pritchett =

Scottish footballer and manager

Personal information
- Full name: Keith Bernard Pritchett
- Date of birth: 8 November 1953 (age 73)
- Place of birth: Glasgow, Scotland
- Position: Left back

Senior career*
Years	Team	Apps	(Gls)
1972–1973	Wolverhampton Wanderers		
1973–1974	Doncaster Rovers	6	(0)
1974–1975	Queens Park Rangers	4	(0)
1976–1977	Brentford	11	(1)
1976–1982	Watford	140	(9)
1982–1984	Blackpool	37	(1)
- Mount Roskill
- Waitakere City

Managerial career
- Waitakere City
- 1996–1997: New Zealand
- * Club domestic league appearances and goals

Keith Bernard Pritchett (born 8 November 1953) is a Scottish former professional footballer. He played as a left back for several Football League clubs, most notably Watford, playing a part in their rise from the Fourth Division to the First Division. He finished his playing career in New Zealand, and managed the New Zealand national team from 1996 to 1997.

== Playing career ==
Glaswegian Pritchett spent six years with Watford, playing for them in all four divisions of the Football League. He also played for Wolverhampton Wanderers, Doncaster Rovers, Queens Park Rangers, Brentford and Blackpool. He finished his playing career in New Zealand, firstly at Mount Roskill, and later as player-manager of Waitakere City.

== Management career ==
Pritchett managed the New Zealand national team taking charge for the first time in June 1996. New Zealand won two, drew one and lost eight of his 11 games in charge.

He is currently director of football with United Soccer 1, New Zealand's northernmost football federation.

== Other ==
His son, James, represented New Zealand at under-17, under-23 and senior level.
