= Melissa Ruscoe =

New Zealand sportswoman

Melissa Ruscoe MNZM
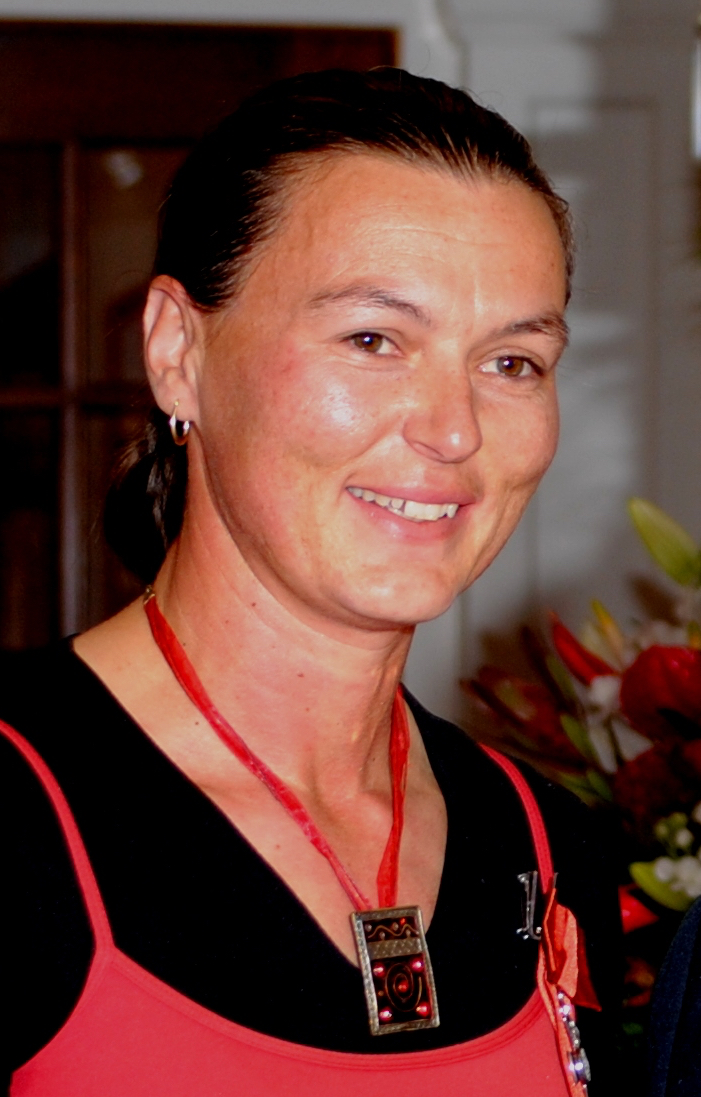
- Ruscoe in 2011
- Born: Melissa Jane Ruscoe; 15 December 1976 (age 49); New Zealand
Association football career
- Height: 1.76 m (5 ft 9 1/2 in)
International career
Years	Team	Apps	(Gls)
1994–2000	New Zealand	23	(2)

Rugby union career
International career
Years	Team	Apps	(Points)
2004–2010	New Zealand	22	(32)
Medal record
Representing New Zealand
Women's rugby union
Rugby World Cup
Gold medal – first place	2006 Canada	Team competition
Gold medal – first place	2010 England	Team competition

Melissa Jane Ruscoe MNZM (born 15 December 1976) is a New Zealand sportswoman who has served as captain of her country's national team in two different football codes: association football and rugby union.

== Football career ==
Ruscoe made her Football Ferns debut in a 0–1 loss to Bulgaria on 24 August 1994. She finished her international career with 23 caps and 2 goals to her credit.

== Rugby career ==
After leaving behind her international career in soccer, Ruscoe switched to rugby, joining the Canterbury team in New Zealand's women's provincial championship in 2003. As a loose forward, she made the Black Ferns the following year. She has played on Black Ferns teams that won the Churchill Cup in 2004 and the Women's Rugby World Cup in 2006, and was also named the New Zealand women's player of the year in 2005. Ruscoe captained the Black Ferns to victory in the 2010 Women's Rugby World Cup.

In the 2011 New Year Honours, Ruscoe was appointed a Member of the New Zealand Order of Merit for services to women's rugby. She has been the assistant coach of Canterbury in the Farah Palmer Cup since 2016. She currently teaches at Hillmorton High School.
