= Sara Clapham =

New Zealand footballer

Personal information
- Full name: Sara Clapham
- Date of birth: 31 January 1985 (age 41)
- Place of birth: Christchurch, New Zealand
- Height: 5 ft 4 in (1.63 m)
- Position: Midfielder

College career
Years	Team	Apps	(Gls)
2004–2007	Kennesaw State Owls		

International career
2004	New Zealand	3	(0)

Sara Clapham (born 31 January 1985) is a former association football player who represented New Zealand at international level.

Clapham made her Football Ferns début in a 0–2 loss to Australia on 18 February 2004, and finished her international career with three caps to her credit.

Her brother Aaron Clapham was included in the New Zealand squad for the 2010 FIFA World Cup in South Africa

== Honours ==
Individual

- Mainland Football Women's Midfielder of the Year: 2009
