= Kirsty Yallop =

New Zealand footballer (born 1986)

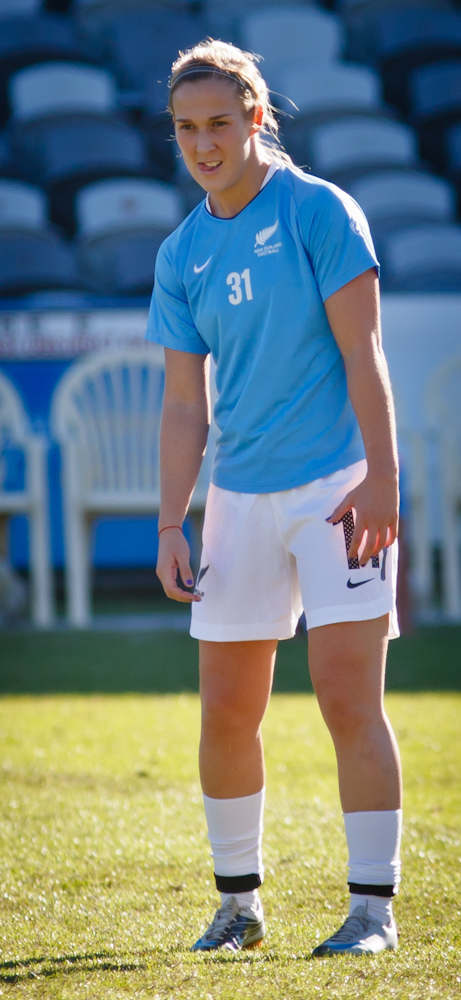
- Yallop playing for New Zealand in 2011

Personal information
- Full name: Kirsty Lee Yallop
- Date of birth: 4 November 1986 (age 40)
- Place of birth: Auckland, New Zealand
- Height: 1.64 m (5 ft 5 in)
- Position: Midfielder

Senior career*
Years	Team	Apps	(Gls)
- Lynn-Avon United
2009–2010	Pali Blues	10	(1)
2010–2011	Kristianstads DFF	21	(1)
2011–2015	Vittsjö GIK	85	(11)
2015–2016	Brisbane Roar	8	(2)
2016	Mallbackens	17	(0)
2016–2017	Melbourne Victory	3	(0)
2017–2018	Klepp	44	(6)

International career^{‡}
2004	New Zealand U-20		
2004–2017	New Zealand	104	(12)
- * Club domestic league appearances and goals as of 13 August 2018 ‡ National team caps and goals as of 16 June 2015

Kirsty Lee Yallop (/ˈjæləp/ YAL-əp; born 4 November 1986) is a New Zealand former footballer who played as a midfielder. She played for the New Zealand women's national football team from 2004 to 2017. Yallop made history by scoring New Zealand’s first ever goal at an Olympic Games in 2008.

== Club career ==
At club level, she played for Lynn-Avon United before moving to Kristianstads DFF in Sweden's Damallsvenskan in 2010. For the 2011 season, she moved to second-tier side Vittsjö GIK. In her first year at Vittsjö, the team attained promotion to Damallsvenskan.

On 31 October 2015, Yallop joined Australian club Brisbane Roar.

On 9 December 2016, Yallop joined Melbourne Victory as an injury replacement for Bianca Henninger. In October 2017, it was confirmed that she did not re-sign with Melbourne Victory for a further season. In 2017, Yallop joined Norwegian side Klepp.

== International career ==
Yallop made her senior international debut in a 6–0 loss to the United States on 10 October 2004.

Yallop captained the U-20 side at the 2006 FIFA U-20 Women's World Championship finals in Russia, where they lost to Australia (3–0) and Russia (3–2), before holding Brazil to a goalless draw,

Yallop was included in the New Zealand squad for the 2008 Summer Olympics, playing the full 90 minutes in each of New Zealand's group games, scoring one of New Zealand's goals in the 2–2 draw with Japan.

Attending her first Women's World Cup at Germany 2011, Yallop earned her 50th cap in her only appearance at the finals in a 1–1 draw with Mexico as New Zealand won their first ever point at a Senior Women's World Cup.

She played in all of New Zealand's games at the 2012 Summer Olympics.

She featured in one of New Zealand's three matches at the 2015 FIFA Women's World Cup in Canada.

On 20 September 2017, after playing two games against United States, Yallop announced her retirement from international football.

== Personal life ==
In December 2017, Yallop's engagement to Klepp IL teammate and Australia international Tameka Butt was announced on Butt's Twitter account. The two were married in Mangawhai, New Zealand, on 9 February 2019. Later in 2020 they had a daughter together named Harley. In March 2025, the couple announced on Instagram that they would be having a second child.

Yallop has a master's degree from Massey University, completing her thesis on international rugby sevens players.

== International goals ==
No.	Date	Venue	Opponent	Score	Result	Competition
1.	9 April 2007	Lae, Papua New Guinea	Tonga	1–0	6–1	2007 OFC Women's Championship
2.	9 April 2007	Lae, Papua New Guinea	Tonga	5–0	6–1	2007 OFC Women's Championship
3.	13 April 2007	Lae, Papua New Guinea	Papua New Guinea	4–0	7–0	2007 OFC Women's Championship
4.	13 April 2007	Lae, Papua New Guinea	Papua New Guinea	6–0	7–0	2007 OFC Women's Championship
5.	8 March 2008	Port Moresby, Papua New Guinea	Papua New Guinea	2–0	2–0	2008 OFC Women's Olympic Qualifying Tournament
6.	14 June 2008	Suwon, South Korea	South Korea	1–0	1–2	2008 Peace Queen Cup
7.	6 August 2008	Qinhuangdao, China	Japan	1–0	2–2	2008 Summer Olympics
8.	10 March 2009	Paralimni, Cyprus	Netherlands	2–0	2–0	2009 Cyprus Women's Cup
9.	12 March 2009	Nicosia, Cyprus	France	1–0	1–1 (5–6 p)	2009 Cyprus Women's Cup
10.	3 October 2010	Auckland, New Zealand	Tahiti	5–0	7–0	2010 OFC Women's Championship
11.	4 March 2011	Larnaca, Cyprus	Switzerland	1–0	2–1	2011 Cyprus Women's Cup
