= Kelly Jarden =

New Zealand footballer

Personal information
- Full name: Kelly Jarden
- Date of birth: 4 June 1973 (age 53)
- Place of birth: New Zealand

International career
Years	Team	Apps	(Gls)
1997–2003	New Zealand	13	(0)

Kelly Jarden (born 4 June 1973) is an association football player who represented New Zealand at international level.

Jarden made her Football Ferns début in a 1–3 loss to China on 21 November 1997, and finished her international career with 13 caps to her credit.
