= Rachel Oliver (footballer) =

New Zealand footballer

Personal information
- Full name: Rachel Oliver
- Date of birth: 24 July 1971 (age 55)
- Place of birth: New Zealand

International career
Years	Team	Apps	(Gls)
1995–2000	New Zealand	22	(0)

Rachel Oliver (born 24 July 1971) is an association football player who represented New Zealand.

Oliver made her Football Ferns in a 0–0 draw with Korea Republic on 8 September 1995, and finished her international career with 22 caps to her credit.
