= Maureen Jacobson =

New Zealand footballer

Personal information
- Full name: Maureen Dale Jacobson
- Date of birth: 7 December 1961 (age 64)
- Place of birth: New Zealand
- Position: Midfielder

Senior career*
Years	Team	Apps	(Gls)
1987–1993	Millwall Lionesses		
1988	HJK Helsinki		

International career
1979–1996	New Zealand	60	(20)
- * Club domestic league appearances and goals

Maureen Dale Jacobson (born 7 December 1961) is a New Zealand former footballer.

== Club career ==
Jacobsen played in England with Millwall Lionesses and was part of their FA Women's Cup winning team in 1991. She also won the Finnish Naisten SM-sarja championship with HJK Helsinki in 1988.

== International career ==
Jacobson made her full Football Ferns debut in a 2–2 draw with Australia 6 October 1979. She went on to become New Zealand's second most capped female player with 60 caps and 20 goals to her credit.

Jacobson represented New Zealand at the Women's World Cup finals in China in 1991 playing all 3 group games; a 0–3 loss to Denmark, a 0–4 loss to Norway and a 1–4 loss to China.

== Personal life ==
Jacobson is the aunt of American player of American football Michael Wilson and the aunt-in-law of American association football player Sophia Wilson (Michael's wife).

== Honours ==
Millwall

- Women's FA Cup:1991

HJK

- Finnish League:1988
