= Rebecca Smith (footballer) =

New Zealand footballer

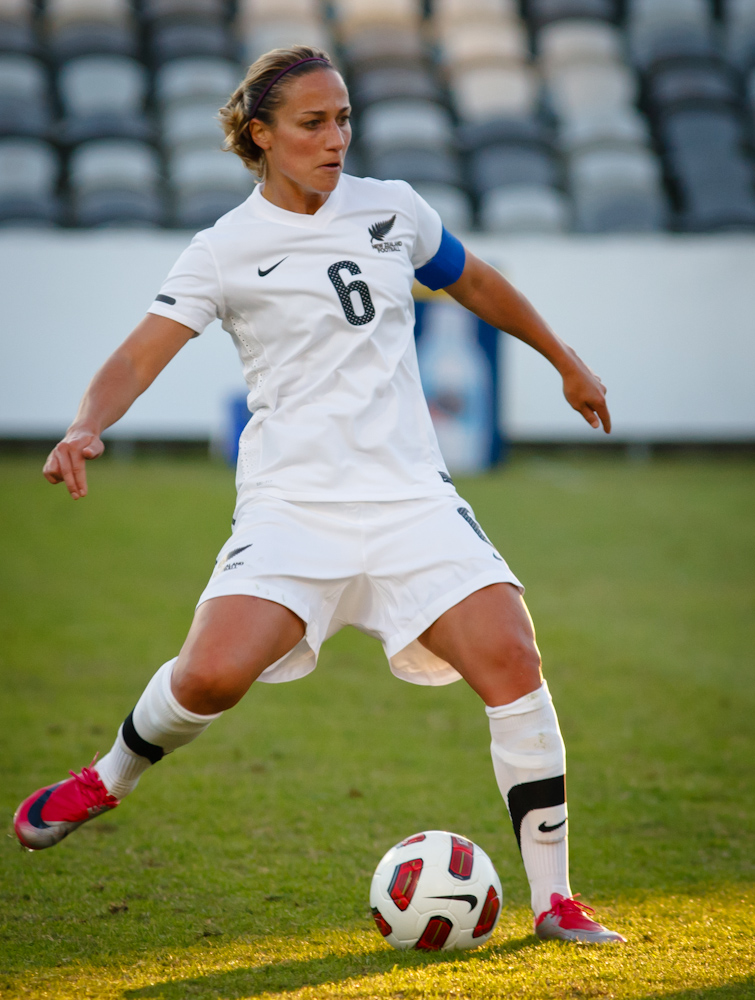

Personal information
- Full name: Rebecca Katie Smith
- Date of birth: 17 June 1981 (age 45)
- Place of birth: Los Angeles, California, United States
- Height: 1.75 m (5 ft 9 in)
- Position: Defender

Youth career
- Palos Verdes Breakers
- South Bay Gunners
- Fram-CQ Soccer Club
- 1995–1999: Chadwick School
- 1999–2003: Duke Blue Devils

Senior career*
Years	Team	Apps	(Gls)
2003–2004	Ajax America Women		
2004	1. FFC Frankfurt		
2005	FSV Frankfurt		
2005–2008	Sunnanå SK		
2008	Newcastle Jets	6	(0)
2009–2013	VfL Wolfsburg	70	(6)

International career^{‡}
2003–2013	New Zealand	74	(6)
- * Club domestic league appearances and goals ‡ National team caps and goals as of 10 October 2013

Rebecca Katie Smith (born 17 June 1981) is a New Zealand former footballer who played as a defender.

Smith was a World Cup and Olympic footballer captaining the New Zealand women's national football team, and culminating her club career winning The Triple with VfL Wolfsburg as UEFA Champions League, German League, and German Cup Winners up until her retirement in 2013.

== Early life ==
Smith was born in Los Angeles, California to New Zealand parents and attended high school at Chadwick School in Palos Verdes, California and played soccer there during her first year. She lettered in basketball, waterpolo and softball all years at Chadwick. She graduated in 1999 with the highest honor in her class, The Headmaster's Award.

== Football career ==
Smith captained NCAA Div 1 Duke University side and graduated with an Economics and Spanish degree before deciding to pursue her football career abroad, landing a professional contract in Germany with then European Champions, FFC Frankfurt.

Smith then played for the Sunnanå SK in Sweden and then Newcastle Jets in the inaugural W-League in Australia, before being signed by VfL Wolfsburg on 2 February 2009. While at VfL Wolfsburg, Smith helped the club win the coveted Treble (Triple), the Frauen-Bundesliga in 2012–2013, the UEFA Women's Champions League in 2012–2013 with a 1–0 win over Lyon in the finals, and the DFB Pokal as well as the Ladies First Cup in 2013 with a 2–0 win over Barcelona in the finals.

In 2013, she ended her career due to knee problems.

== International ==
Smith made her Football Ferns debut in a 15–0 victory over Samoa on 7 April 2003, and captained New Zealand at the 2007 FIFA Women's World Cup finals in China, where they lost to Brazil 0–5, Denmark (0-2) and China (0-2).

Smith was also included in the New Zealand squad for the 2008 Summer Olympics where they drew with Japan (2-2) before losing to Norway(0-1) and USA (0-4). Smith's solid performances in New Zealand's rearguard earned her a FIFA Women's World Player of the Year nomination in 2007 and New Zealand Player of the Year in 2007. She was also named Oceania's Player of the Year twice in both 2011 and 2013.

Smith played her 50th international in a friendly against Australia on 12 May 2011.

Smith captained New Zealand for the 2011 FIFA Women's World Cup finals in Germany.

Smith again captained the New Zealand team that reached the quarter-finals at the 2012 Summer Olympics.

On 18 September 2013, Smith announced her retirement from football.

== International goals ==
No.	Date	Venue	Opponent	Score	Result	Competition
1.	5 July 2011	Rhein-Neckar-Arena, Sinsheim, Germany	Mexico	1–2	2–2	2011 FIFA Women's World Cup

== Professional life ==
Smith is fluent in four languages; English, German, Spanish and Swedish. In 2013, she founded women's football consultancy firm Crux Sports, where she is currently its CEO.

=== FIFA ===
When Smith retired from football, she transitioned into working at FIFA, managing their women's competitions.

=== COPA90 ===
Smith joined COPA90, in December 2018 as the Global Executive Director of Women's Game for COPA90.

==== The Players Podcast ====
COPA90 launched The Players Podcast, with BBC, which Smith hosts and sits down with some of the biggest players and personalities in the sport and beyond to talk about topics through the lens of football but that go way beyond football.

=== Optus Sport ===
Smith joined Optus Sport's hosting team, for their broadcast of the 2023 FIFA Women's World Cup which was co-hosted in Australia and New Zealand. As part of the broadcast, she co-hosted a daily morning show called Daily Kick-Off during the tournament, and provided in-studio punditry for certain matches.

== Honours ==
VfL Wolfsburg

- UEFA Women's Champions League: 2012–13
- Frauen-Bundesliga: 2012–13
- DFB-Pokal Frauen: 2012–13

Individual

- IFFHS OFC Woman Team of the Decade 2011–2020
