= Ian Marshall (football manager) =

New Zealand footballer & manager (1942–2003)

Personal information
- Date of birth: 23 April 1942
- Place of birth: Glasgow, Scotland
- Date of death: 23 April 2003 (aged 60)
- Place of death: Christchurch, New Zealand
- Position: Goalkeeper

Senior career*
Years	Team	Apps	(Gls)
- Christchurch Technical

Managerial career
- 1990–1993: New Zealand
- * Club domestic league appearances and goals

Ian Doyle Marshall (27 April 1942 – 22 April 2003) was a football (soccer) coach who managed the New Zealand national team. Marshall secured the job in June 1989 and took charge of his first official international in January 1990. New Zealand won 13, drew 3 and lost 19 of his 35 games in charge.

During his playing career, Marshall gained a runner-sup Chatham Cup medal for Christchurch Technical, playing in goal in the 1968 final.

== Honours ==
New Zealand U23

- OFC U-23 Championship runner-up: 1991
