= Zoe Thompson =

New Zealand footballer

Personal information
- Full name: Zoe Victoria Thompson
- Date of birth: 16 September 1983 (age 43)
- Height: 1.66 m (5 ft 5 in)
- Position: Striker

Team information
- Current team: Glenfield Rovers

International career^{‡}
Years	Team	Apps	(Gls)
2007	New Zealand	12	(2)
- ‡ National team caps and goals as of 15 January 2009

Zoe Thompson (born 16 September 1983) is an association football player who represented New Zealand at international level. She attended Takapuna Grammar School and was Deputy Head Girl in her last year, 2001. She currently plays for Glenfield Rovers.

Thompson made her Football Ferns debut as a substitute in a 0–3 loss to China on 22 February 2004, and represented New Zealand at the 2007 FIFA Women's World Cup finals in China, where they lost to Brazil 0–5, Denmark (0-2) and China (0-2).
