= Priscilla Duncan =

New Zealand footballer (born 1983)

Personal information
- Full name: Priscilla Duncan
- Date of birth: 19 May 1983 (age 43)
- Height: 1.60 m (5 ft 3 in)
- Position: Midfielder

Team information
- Current team: Onehunga Sports

Senior career*
Years	Team	Apps	(Gls)
- Glenfield Rovers

International career
- New Zealand U-20
2003–2007	New Zealand	20	(1)
- * Club domestic league appearances and goals

Priscilla "Cilla" Duncan (born 19 May 1983) is a former association football player who represented New Zealand at international level as a central midfielder. Following her retirement from playing, she has been involved with the media aspect of the game, working for both Oceania Football Confederation and FIFA in a media relations capacity.

Duncan represented New Zealand at age group level, appearing at the OFC U-20 Qualifying Tournament 2002 and was named New Zealand Young Player of the Year in 2002 and 2003.

She made her full Football Ferns debut against Samoa on 7 April 2003 and scored her first senior international goal in a 5–0 win over Papua New Guinea on 11 April 2003.

Duncan represented New Zealand at the 2007 FIFA Women's World Cup finals in China, where they lost to Brazil 0–5, Denmark (0–2) and China (0–2).

In 2009, she was appointed Head of Media and Communications with the Oceania Football Confederation, a position she held for three years. She worked at the London 2012 Summer Olympics and in 2013, Duncan joined FIFA as part of their Media Department.

== Personal ==
She is married to fellow New Zealand footballer Katie Duncan (née Hoyle).
