= Nicky Smith (New Zealand footballer) =

New Zealand footballer

Nicola Smith
Personal information
- Full name: Nicola Anne Smith
- Date of birth: 15 February 1980 (age 46)
- Place of birth: New Zealand

International career
Years	Team	Apps	(Gls)
1998–2007	New Zealand	23	(14)

Nicola "Nicky" Smith (born 15 February 1980) is an association football player who represented New Zealand.

Smith made her Football Ferns as a substitute in a 1–4 loss to Germany on 26 May 1998, and finished her international career with 23 caps and 24 goals to her credit.
