= Simone Carmichael =

New Zealand footballer

Personal information
- Full name: Simone Carmichael
- Birth name: Simone Ferrara
- Date of birth: 7 June 1977 (age 49)
- Height: 1.60 m (5 ft 3 in)
- Position: Midfielder

International career
Years	Team	Apps	(Gls)
2000–	New Zealand	25	(7)

Simone Carmichael (née Ferrara) (born 7 June 1977) is an association football player who represented New Zealand at international level.

== Career ==
Carmichael made her Football Ferns debut in a 1–2 loss to Canada on 31 May 2000, and represented New Zealand at the 2007 FIFA Women's World Cup finals in China, where they lost to Brazil 0–5, Denmark (0–2) and China (0–2).

== Personal life ==
Carmichael was married on 10 April 2004. However, she wore her maiden name Ferrara on her jersey at the 2007 World Cup.
