= 1995–96 Inter Milan season =

Inter Milan
1995–96 season
- Owner: Massimo Moratti
- President: Massimo Moratti
- Manager: Ottavio Bianchi (until 25 September 1995); Luis Suárez (until 16 October 1995); Roy Hodgson
- Serie A: 7th
- Coppa Italia: Semi-final
- UEFA Cup: First round
- Top goalscorer: League: Marco Branca (17); All: Marco Branca (17)
Home colours	Away colours	Third colours

During the 1995–96 Italian football season, Inter Milan competed in Serie A.

== Season summary ==
Inter continued to languish quite far back from the top teams, finishing an unspectacular seventh in the domestic league competition. Despite a reigniting of the team under Roy Hodgson, poached away from Switzerland's national team, Inter was unable to claim a European slot on merit, and was only awarded a UEFA Cup slot thanks to Juventus winning the Champions League.

Prior to the season had Inter made three important signings, with Paul Ince, Roberto Carlos and Javier Zanetti all joining the club. While Ince and Roberto Carlos would leave the club in a few seasons, Zanetti would be a stalwart for Inter in years to come, captaining the team in the 2010 UEFA Champions League Final, 15 years on from his signing.

== Squad ==
Note: Flags indicate national team as defined under FIFA eligibility rules; some limited exceptions apply. Players may hold more than one non-FIFA nationality.

No.	Pos.	Nation	Player
1	GK	ITA	Gianluca Pagliuca
2	DF	ITA	Giuseppe Bergomi
3	DF	ITA	Andrea Seno
4	DF	ARG	Javier Zanetti
5	MF	ITA	Francesco Dell'Anno
6	DF	BRA	Roberto Carlos
7	MF	ITA	Pierluigi Orlandini
8	MF	ENG	Paul Ince
9	MF	ITA	Felice Centofanti
10	MF	ITA	Benito Carbone
12	GK	ITA	Giorgio Frezzolini
13	DF	ITA	Gianluca Festa
14	MF	ITA	Alessandro Bianchi

No.	Pos.	Nation	Player
15	MF	ITA	Fabio Cinetti
16	DF	ITA	Alessandro Pedroni
17	DF	ITA	Salvatore Fresi
18	MF	ITA	Nicola Berti
19	DF	ITA	Massimo Paganin
20	MF	ITA	Antonio Manicone
22	GK	ITA	Marco Landucci
23	FW	ITA	Maurizio Ganz
24	FW	ITA	Davide Fontolan
26	FW	BRA	Caio
27	FW	ITA	Marco Branca
28	DF	ITA	Alessandro Pistone

=== Transfers ===
In
Pos.	Name	from	Type
MF	Paul Ince	Manchester United	
DF	Javier Zanetti	Banfield	
DF	Roberto Carlos	Palmeiras	
FW	Sebastián Rambert	Independiente	
MF	Benito Carbone	Napoli	
FW	Maurizio Ganz	Atalanta	
DF	Salvatore Fresi	Salernitana	
GK	Giorgio Frezzolini	Carpi	
GK	Marco Landucci	Avellino	
GK	Marco Varaldi	Milan	
DF	Felice Centofanti	Ancona	
DF	Alessandro Pedroni	Cremonese	
MF	Fabio Cinetti	Monza	
MF	Massimiliano Fusani	Aosta	
FW	Mohamed Kallon	Tadamon Sour	
MF	Fabio Di Sauro	Gualdo	loan ended
MF	Igor Shalimov	Duisburg	loan ended
FW	Arturo Di Napoli	Gualdo	loan ended
MF	Antonio Manicone	Genoa	loan ended
DF	Mirko Taccola	Palermo	loan ended
DF	Paolo Tramezzani	Venezia	loan ended

Out
Pos.	Name	To	Type
FW	Dennis Bergkamp	Arsenal	
MF	Wim Jonk	PSV Eindhoven	
FW	Rubén Sosa	Borussia Dortmund	
FW	Darko Pančev	Fortuna Dusseldorf	
GK	Marco Fortin	Pro Sesto	co-ownership
GK	Luca Mondini	Vicenza	co-ownership
GK	Paolo Orlandoni	Ancona	loan
DF	Giovanni Bia	Udinese	loan
DF	Antonio Paganin	Atalanta	
DF	Mirko Conte	Piacenza	co-ownership
DF	Mirko Taccola	Napoli	co-ownership
DF	Paolo Tramezzani	Cesena	loan
MF	Marco Barollo	Venezia	
MF	Fabio Di Sauro	Cremonese	co-ownership
MF	Angelo Orlando	Cremonese	
MF	Igor Shalimov	Lugano	loan
MF	Andrea Zanchetta	Foggia	co-ownership
FW	Mohammed Kallon	Lugano	loan
FW	Arturo Di Napoli	Napoli	co-ownership
FW	Massimo Marazzina	Foggia	co-ownership
FW	Marco Veronese	Reggiana	loan

==== Winter ====
In
Pos.	Name	from	Type
FW	Marco Branca	Roma	
DF	Alessandro Pistone	Vicenza	

Out
Pos.	Name	To	Type
FW	Sebastián Rambert	Real Zaragoza	loan
FW	Marco Delvecchio	Roma	

== Competitions ==
=== Serie A ===
==== League table ====
Pos	Team	Pld	W	D	L	GF	GA	GD	Pts	Qualification or relegation
5	Roma	34	16	10	8	51	34	+17	58 (Note: ROM 1-1 PAR; PAR 1-1 ROM Roma is ahead due to Goal difference.)	Qualification to UEFA Cup
6	Parma	34	16	10	8	44	31	+13	58	Qualification to UEFA Cup
7	Internazionale	34	15	9	10	51	30	+21	54	Qualification to UEFA Cup
8	Sampdoria	34	14	10	10	59	47	+12	52	
9	Vicenza	34	13	10	11	36	37	−1	49	

Source: 1995–96 Serie A, RSSSF.com, Soccerway
Rules for classification: 1) Points; 2) Head-to-head points; 3) Head-to-head goal difference; 4) Goal difference; 5) Goals scored; 6) Draw. (Note: Head-to-head record is used only after all the matches between the teams in question have been played).

==== Results by round ====
Round	1	2	3	4	5	6	7	8	9	10	11	12	13	14	15	16	17	18	19	20	21	22	23	24	25	26	27	28	29	30	31	32	33	34
Ground	H	A	H	A	H	A	H	A	H	A	H	A	H	H	A	H	A	A	H	A	H	A	H	A	H	A	H	A	H	A	A	H	A	H
Result	W	L	D	L	W	D	D	D	D	W	D	W	L	L	W	L	W	D	D	L	W	W	W	W	W	W	L	W	L	W	L	D	W	L
Position	1	7	8	11	8	8	9	9	11	9	10	7	9	12	8	11	8	8	7	9	7	6	6	6	5	4	4	4	6	4	6	7	7	7

Source: Competitive matches
A = Away; H = Home; W = Win; D = Draw; L = Loss; = Leader, 1996–97 UEFA Champions League Group stage; = 1996–97 UEFA Cup First round

==== Matches ====
27 August 1995 1	Inter	1–0	Vicenza	Milan
16:00 CEST (UTC+02:00)	R. Carlos 53'	Report		Stadium: Stadio Giuseppe Meazza; Referee: Rodomonti

10 September 1995 2	Parma	2–1	Inter	Parma
20:30 CEST (UTC+02:00)	Zola 48'; D. Baggio 52'	Report	R. Carlos 41'	Stadium: Ennio Tardini; Referee: Stafoggia

17 September 1995 3	Inter	0–0	Piacenza	Milan
16:00 CEST (UTC+02:00)		Report		Stadium: Stadio Giuseppe Meazza; Referee: Quartuccio

24 September 1995 4	Napoli	2–1	Inter	Naples
16:00 CET (UTC+01:00)	Imbriani 33'; Buso 66'	Report	Fontolan 46'	Stadium: Stadio San Paolo; Referee: Pairetto

1 October 1995 5	Inter	4–0	Torino	Milan
15:00 CET (UTC+01:00)	R. Carlos 10'; Ganz 35' (pen.), 53' (pen.); Delvecchio 45'	Report		Stadium: Stadio Giuseppe Meazza; Referee: Beschin

15 October 1995 6	Atalanta	1–1	Inter	Bergamo
15:00 CET (UTC+01:00)	Morfeo 85'	Report	Herrera 71' (o.g.)	Stadium: Stadio Atleti Azzurri d'Italia; Referee: Collina

22 October 1995 7	Inter	0–0	Lazio	Milan
14:30 CET (UTC+01:00)		Report		Stadium: Stadio Giuseppe Meazza; Referee: Ceccarini

29 October 1995 8	Inter	1–1	Milan	Milan
20:30 CET	M. Paganin 19'	Report	Savićević 46'	Stadium: Stadio Giuseppe Meazza; Referee: Braschi

5 November 1995 9	Sampdoria	0–0	Inter	Genoa
14:30 CET		Report		Stadium: Stadio Luigi Ferraris; Referee: Nicchi

19 November 1995 10	Inter	2–1	Udinese	Milan
14:30 CET	Branca 57'; Carbone 74'	Report	Bia 79' (pen.)	Stadium: Stadio Giuseppe Meazza; Referee: Tombolini

26 November 1995 11	Fiorentina	1–1	Inter	Florence
14:30 CET	Batistuta 66'	Report	Ganz 17'	Stadium: Stadio Artemio Franchi; Referee: Trentalange

3 December 1995 12	Inter	2–0	Cremonese	Milan
	Zanetti 19'; Ganz 43'	Report		Stadium: Stadio Giuseppe Meazza

10 December 1995 13	Padova	2–1	Inter	Padua
	Vlaović 16', 47'	Report	Ganz 43'	Stadium: Stadio Euganeo

17 December 1995 14	Juventus	1–0	Inter	Turin
	Vialli 29'	Report		Stadium: Delle Alpi

23 December 1995 15	Inter	4–0	Cagliari	Milan
14:30	Ganz 12'; Branca 23', 35', 68'	Report		Stadium: Stadio Giuseppe Meazza

7 January 1996 16	Bari	4–1	Inter	Bari
	Sala 35'; Protti 73', 90'; Ingesson 79'	Report	R. Carlos 15'	Stadium: Stadio San Nicola

14 January 1996 17	Inter	2–0	Roma	Milan
	Branca 17', 66'	Report		Stadium: Stadio Giuseppe Meazza

21 January 1996 18	Vicenza	1–1	Inter	Vicenza
	Otero 89' (pen.)	Report	Ganz 24'	Stadium: Stadio Romeo Menti

28 January 1996 19	Inter	1–1	Parma	Milan
	Branca 83'	Report	Stoichkov 5'	Stadium: Stadio Giuseppe Meazza

4 February 1996 20	Piacenza	1–0	Inter	Piacenza
	A. Carbone 90'	Report		Stadium: Stadio Galleana

11 February 1996 21	Inter	4–0	Napoli	Milan
	Ganz 32', 56' (pen.); Branca 67', 80'	Report		Stadium: Stadio Giuseppe Meazza

18 February 1996 22	Torino	0–1	Inter	Turin
		Report	Branca 16'	Stadium: Delle Alpi

25 February 1996 23	Inter	1–0	Atalanta	Milan
	Branca 7'	Report		Stadium: Stadio Giuseppe Meazza

3 March 1996 24	Lazio	0–1	Inter	Rome
		Report	Nesta 64' (o.g.)	Stadium: Stadio Olimpico

10 March 1996 25	Milan	0–1	Inter	Milan
		Report	Branca 5'	Stadium: San Siro

24 March 1996 27	Udinese	1–2	Inter	Udine
	Bierhoff 81'	Report	Fontolan 24'; R. Carlos 65'	Stadium: Stadio Friuli

31 March 1996 28	Inter	1–2	Fiorentina	Milan
	Centofanti 10'	Report	Cois 26'; Padalino 32'	Stadium: Stadio Giuseppe Meazza

6 April 1996 29	Cremonese	2–4	Inter	Cremona
	Tentoni 51', 82'	Report	Ince 45'; Zanetti 55'; Pistone 79'; Branca 90'

10 April 1996 26	Inter	0–2	Sampdoria	Milan
		Report	Chiesa 44', 68' (pen.)	Stadium: Stadio Giuseppe Meazza

14 April 1996 30	Inter	8–2	Padova	Milan
	Branca 4', 40', 47'; Carbone 12'; Ince 45'; Festa 66'; Ganz 78', 80'	Report	Amoruso 27', 61'	Stadium: Stadio Giuseppe Meazza

20 April 1996 31	Inter	1–2	Juventus	Milan
	Ganz 79'	Report	Lombardo 4'; Conte 55'	Stadium: Stadio Giuseppe Meazza

28 April 1996 32	Cagliari	0–0	Inter	Cagliari
		Report		Stadium: Stadio Sant'Elia

5 May 1996 33	Inter	3–0	Bari	Milan
	Ince 34'; Branca 38'; Ganz 52'	Report		Stadium: Stadio Giuseppe Meazza

12 May 1996 34	Roma	1–0	Inter	Rome
	Di Biagio 44' (pen.)	Report		Stadium: Stadio Olimpico

=== Coppa Italia ===
==== Second round ====
30 August 1995	Venezia	0–1	Inter	Venice
20:30 CET			69' Roberto Carlos	Stadium: Stadio Pier Luigi Penzo; Referee: Braschi

==== Eightfinals ====
24 October 1995	Fiorenzuola	1–2	Inter	Fiorenzuola
20:30 CET	Scazzola 24'		7' Carbone; 60' Festa	Stadium: Stadio Comunale di Fiorenzuola; Referee: Cardona

==== Quarterfinals ====
29 November 1995	Inter	1–1	Lazio	Milan
20:30 CET	Ganz 75'		83' Rambaudi	Stadium: Stadio Giuseppe Meazza; Referee: Cesari

12 December 1995	Lazio	0–1	Inter	Rome
20:30 CET			77' Berti	Stadium: Stadio Olimpico; Referee: Collina

==== Semifinals ====
15 February 1996	Fiorentina	3–1	Inter	Florence
20:30 CET	Batistuta 14' (pen.), 47', 86'		32' Ganz	Stadium: Stadio Artemio Franchi; Referee: Beschin

28 February 1996	Inter	0–1	Fiorentina	Milan
20:30 CET			78' Batistuta	Stadium: Stadio Giuseppe Meazza; Referee: Cesari

=== UEFA Cup ===
==== First round ====
12 September 1995	Lugano	1–1	Inter	Lugano
20:45 (CEST)	Carrasco 67'		13' Roberto Carlos	Stadium: Stade Cornaredo; Attendance: 12.000; Referee: (Netherlands) Jol

26 September 1995	Inter	0–1	Lugano	Milan
20:45 (CEST)			85' Carrasco	Stadium: Stadio Giuseppe Meazza; Attendance: 15,955; Referee: (Germany) Weber

== Statistics ==
=== Players statistics ===
No.	Pos	Nat	Player	Total		Serie A		Coppa		UEFA	
No.	Pos	Nat	Player	Apps	Goals	Apps	Goals	Apps	Goals	Apps	Goals
	GK	(Italy) ITA	Pagliuca	42	-38	34	-30	6	-6	2	-2
	DF	(Argentina) ARG	Zanetti J	39	2	32	2	5	0	2	0
	DF	(Italy) ITA	Bergomi	33	0	23+4	0	5	0	1	0
	DF	(Italy) ITA	Festa	39	2	30+1	1	6	1	2	0
	DF	(Italy) ITA	Fresi	37	0	28+2	0	5	0	2	0
	DF	(Italy) ITA	Paganin	40	1	32	1	6	0	2	0
	MF	(Italy) ITA	Carbone	39	3	25+6	2	6	1	2	0
	MF	(England) ENG	Ince	35	3	30	3	5	0	0	0
	MF	(Brazil) BRA	Roberto Carlos	34	7	29+1	5	2	1	2	1
	FW	(Italy) ITA	Branca	27	17	24	17	3	0	0	0
	FW	(Italy) ITA	Ganz	40	15	25+7	13	6	2	2	0
	GK	(Italy) ITA	Frezzolini	0	0	0	-0	0	-0	0	-0
	DF	(Italy) ITA	Pistone	21	1	14+5	1	2	0	0	0
	MF	(Italy) ITA	Fontolan	28	2	13+12	2	2	0	1	0
	MF	(Italy) ITA	Bianchi	18	0	7+7	0	3	0	1	0
	MF	(Italy) ITA	Berti	13	1	7+3	0	2	1	1	0
	MF	(Italy) ITA	Dell'Anno	19	0	6+10	0	3	0	0	0
	DF	(Italy) ITA	Centofanti	13	1	4+5	1	3	0	1	0
	DF	(Italy) ITA	Manicone	10	0	4+3	0	1	0	2	0
	FW	(Italy) ITA	Delvecchio	5	1	3+1	1	0	0	1	0
	DF	(Italy) ITA	Seno	3	0	2	0	0	0	1	0
	FW	(Brazil) BRA	Caio	8	0	1+5	0	2	0	0	0
	DF	(Italy) ITA	Cinetti	6	0	1+4	0	1	0	0	0
	DF	(Italy) ITA	Orlandini	11	0	0+7	0	2	0	2	0
	DF	(Italy) ITA	Pedroni	4	0	0+3	0	1	0	0	0
	GK	(Italy) ITA	Landucci	0	0	0	-0	0	-0	0	-0
	MF	(Argentina) ARG	Rambert	2	0	0	0	1	0	1	0

- Source: http://calcio-seriea.net/presenze/1995/1094/

== Sources ==
- RSSSF - Italy 1995/96
