= Centofanti =

Centofanti (pronounced [ˌtʃɛntoˈfanti], lit. 'one hundred infantrymen') is an Italian surname from Abruzzo and Lazio. Notable people with the surname include:

- Felice Centofanti (born 1969), Italian footballer
- Martina Centofanti (born 1998), Italian rhythmic gymnast, daughter of Felice
- Nicola Centofanti, Australian politician
- Silvestro Centofanti (1794–1880), Italian politician
