= María Eugenia Rubio (footballer) =

Mexican footballer

Personal information
- Full name: María Eugenia Rubio Ríos
- Position: Forward

International career
Years	Team	Apps	(Gls)
- Mexico

María Eugenia Rubio Ríos, also called La Peque, is a retired footballer who played as a forward for the unofficial Mexico women's national football team at the 1970 and 1971 Women's World Cups. In 2018, she became the first Mexican woman inducted into the International Football Hall of Fame in Pachuca, Mexico. In 1999, she was named the eighth best woman player in Concacaf during the 20th century.

== International career ==
=== 1970 Coppa del Mondo ===
In the first match of the 1970 Women's World Cup, contested between Mexico and Austria in Bari, Italy, Rubio scored the tournament's first goal in the first minute of the match. She scored again in the 31st minute of the match. Mexico finished the tournament in third place. Rubio was celebrated at the airport upon the team's return from Italy.

=== 1971 Mundial ===
Rubio again scored the tournament's first goal, in the 21st minute against Argentina, and scored a second in the 49th minute in a 3–1 victory on 15 August 1971. She was among the players who requested to be paid before playing in the final match against Denmark, which Mexico lost to finish second in the tournament.

== Playing style ==
Rubio was among the shortest players on the Mexican team, earning her the nickname La Peque ("the short one"). Her dribbling ability was remarked upon by reports, including one story that suggested she ran through the legs of a taller Austrian defender.

== Personal life ==
Rubio's brother Sergio played professionally for Cruz Azul and C.D. Guadalajara, where he was nicknamed El Peque.

== Honors ==
- IFFHS CONCACAF World Team of the XXth Century
- International Football Hall of Fame: 2018
