= Colibríes de Morelos =

Association football club

Club De Fútbol Cuernavaca
- Full name: Colibríes de Morelos
- Nickname: Los Colibríes
- Founded: December 10, 2002
- Dissolved: June 1, 2003
- Ground: Estadio Mariano Matamoros. Xochitepec, Morelos, Mexico
- Capacity: 18,000
- Manager: (Mexico) Felipe de Jesús Ocampo
- League: Primera División de México
Home colours	Away colours

Club De Fútbol Cuernavaca was a Mexican football team. Nicknamed Los Colibríes (The Hummingbirds), the club was founded in 2002 when the state of Morelos bought the Atlético Celaya franchise who at the time played in the top Mexican division. Colibries was the fifth professional club in the state of Morelos to play in the Primera División de México, Atlético Zacatepec being the first in 1948, followed by Marte, which was moved from Mexico City to Cuernavaca in 1953, Cuautla in 1955 and Oaxtepec in 1982. Colibries is the team with the least history in the Primera División, having played only six months in the top league for 2003 before being relegated. That same year, the club was moved and sold to the city of Tijuana, Baja California where it became Trotamundos Tijuana. The club was later moved to Salamanca, Guanajuato and last played in the Tercera División de México. The state of Morelos was also represented by Club Universidad Nacional's inferior squad, Pumas Morelos, up until 2014.

== History ==
Colibríes was a Mexican football team. They are nicknamed Los Colibríes ('hummingbirds'). Their colors were a variation of blue and white. Their uniform color was a blue and white shirt that is split down the middle. Their greatest achievements were in the early 2000s when they played in the top division. The club was founded in 2002 when Atlético Celaya was moved to Cuernavaca, Morelos where they changed the club's colors and badge. There were problems with the club from the beginning when Atlético Zacatepec protested with the city claiming that they did not want another club in the city that played in a higher division than they did. Zacatepec at the time played in the Segunda División de México. Soon after, there were problems with their stadium, which was built between a brook a rocky area. Because of this, the federation implied that fans might use the rocks as weapons, but the FIFA approved the use of the stadium almost at the ultimate hour. The club's first matches were surprisingly good, winning the first 3 out of 4 matches; including a 3–0 home victory against Tecos de la U.A.G. and a 1–3 away victory at Pumas UNAM, but soon after, controversy arose with high attrition when players and coaches alike claimed that their monthly paycheques had no funds/bounce. In 2003 their stadium was finally approved by the federation and played there from 2002's preseason to 2003.

Financial problems arose after they'd found out that their fundless checks wouldn't cover the cost of training, which led to an immediate decline in onfield performance. Such was the issue that training sessions were often held in the backyard of Claudio Pinto da Silva, who was the team's top goalscorer. After a string of poor results, head coach/manager Sergio Rubio, who had been there since week one, was released from his contract, placing Croat national Zlatko Petričević as the interim coach/manager.

One notable game, against America, on week 15 at the Estadio Azteca in front of what was basically an empty stadium, was memorable in that during the team photo, they had revealed white shirts under their uniforms with the words 'basta de mentiras' (which is English for 'stop the lies'), calling out Jorge Rodriguez Marie on their financial problems. They would go on to lose 2–0 in the Estadio Azteca. This would be Sergio Rubio's last match in charge of the squad, after getting re-hired to replace Zlatko Petričević.

== Relegation fight ==
With a poor tournament, the club found itself fighting neck and neck with Chiapas which was also playing its first year in the Primera División de México. On week 17, the final week of regular season, Colibries had a chance to avoid relegation with a victory over Cruz Azul but unfortunately, the club walked away with a 0–0 result, and Chiapas' last minute win over Tecos de la U.A.G. sealed their fate. After the Spring/Clausura 2003 season, they were relegated, placing them in Primera División 'A' de México the following season. Soon after, the club was seized by FMF and the assets were sold and moved to the city of Tijuana, Baja California.

== Statistics ==
Jersey worn by Claudio Puechagut during the 2002–2003 tournament

- Years in Primera División : 0.5
- Years in Segunda División: 0
- Largest win: Colibríes 3 – Tecos 0
- Largest defeat: Toluca 4 – Colibríes 1
- All-time top goalscorer: (Brazil) Claudio da Silva Pinto (8 goals)
- Most games played: Miguel Ángel Pérez, Claudio da Silva Pinto and Mario Darío Grana
- Historic match: Colibries 1–1 Guadalajara (Chivas de Guadalajara's 1000th goal in all Mexican competitions), scored by Jair Garcia
- Clean sheets Miguel Angel Perez and Alejandro Alvarez (one each).

== Managers ==
- The managers for the club in the first division were:
- (Argentina) (Bolivia) Carlos Trucco (since the club's inception in December 2002 to 7 January 2003, preseason)
- (Mexico) Sergio Rubio (weeks 1–10 in the Clausura/Spring 2003)
- (Croatia) Zlatko Petričević (weeks 11 and 12 in the Clausura/Spring 2003)
- (Mexico) Sergio Rubio (weeks 13 to 15 in the Clausura/Spring 2003)
- (Mexico) Felipe de Jesús Ocampo Garcia and Rodolfo Sotelo Esparza (Jointly handled from weeks 16–19 in the Clausura/Spring 2003)
