= Sergio Rubio =

Mexican footballer and manager (born 1956)

Personal information
- Full name: Sergio Rubio Ríos
- Date of birth: November 27, 1956 (age 69)
- Place of birth: San Juan Teotihuacán, State of Mexico, Mexico
- Position: Defender

Senior career*
Years	Team	Apps	(Gls)
1977–1988	Cruz Azul	?	(?)
1988–1990	Guadalajara	?	(?)

Managerial career
- 2002–2003: Colibríes de Morelos
- 2004: Cruz Azul Oaxaca
- 2007: Atlético Celaya
- 2010–2011: Estudiantes de Altamira
Medal record
Representing Mexico
Runner-up	FIFA U-20 World Cup	1977
- * Club domestic league appearances and goals

Sergio Rubio Ríos (born 27 November 1956) is a Mexican football manager and former defender.

== Playing career ==
Sergio Rubio made his debut on July 31, 1977 with Cruz Azul in a match against Unión de Curtidores, where Cruz Azul fell 2-1. With Cruz Azul he was a two-time champion in the 1978-1979 and 1979-1980 seasons.

== Management career ==
Rubio has spent his coaching career in the Liga de Ascenso. He has coached Colibríes de Morelos, including a span in 2003 where he was fired mid-Clausura, re-hired two weeks later, and then fired once again three weeks after being re-hired. He also coached Cruz Azul Oaxaca who are now Cruz Azul Hidalgo, Atlético Celaya who are now Club Celaya, and as of 2011 was the manager at Estudiantes de Altamira.

== Personal life ==
Rubio's sister María Eugenia played for the unofficial Mexico women's national football team in the 1970 and 1971 Women's World Cups, scoring the first goal in each tournament and a total of four across both. Her short stature earned her the nickname La Peque (the short one), and during his career Sergio was nicknamed El Peque.
