= Zlatko Petričević =

Croatian football manager

Personal information
- Date of birth: 7 October 1961 (age 65)
- Place of birth: Zenica, Bosnia and Herzegovina

Managerial career
- Years: Team
- 1996-1997: SVL Flavia Solva
- 1997: Independiente Medellín
- 2000: Atlante
- 2000: Herediano
- 2003: Colibríes de Morelos
- 2016: FC Biel-Bienne

Zlatko Petričević (born 7 October 1961 in Bosnia and Herzegovina) is a Croatian football manager.

== Career ==
Born in Zenica, Petričević managed several clubs in 13 years in Latin America and was president of Croatian side Pomorac Kostrena, but in April 2022 he was sentenced to a suspended prison sentence, because he physically attacked a photographer and verbally threatened a journalist in September 2014.
