= IFFHS World Team =

Annual association football award

IFFHS Men World Team
- Sport: Association football
- Awarded for: Best performing men players of the calendar year
- Presented by: International Federation of Football History & Statistics

History
- First award: 2017
- Editions: 9
- Most wins: (Argentina) Lionel Messi (7 appearances)
- Website: iffhs.com/en

The IFFHS World Team is a football award given annually since 2017. The award is given by the International Federation of Football History & Statistics (IFFHS).

== Men's winners ==
=== List of winners ===
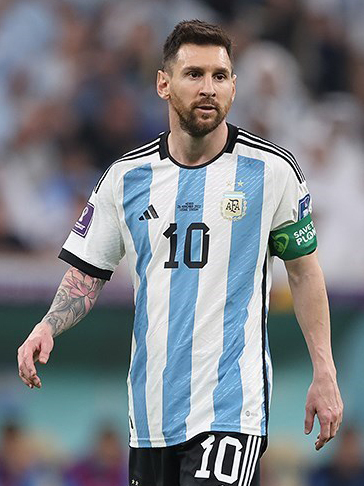
Lionel Messi has made a record seven appearances in the men's world team.

In 2017, IFFHS started to nominate a world team of the year. Players marked bold won the IFFHS World's Best Player (2020–present).

Year	Goalkeeper (club)	Defenders (clubs)	Midfielders (clubs)	Forwards (clubs)	Coach (team)
2017	(Italy) Gianluigi Buffon (Juventus)	(Brazil) Marcelo (Real Madrid) (Spain) Sergio Ramos (Real Madrid) (Italy) Leonardo Bonucci (Juventus/Milan) (Brazil) Dani Alves (Juventus/Paris Saint-Germain)	(Croatia) Luka Modrić (Real Madrid) (Germany) Toni Kroos (Real Madrid) (Belgium) Kevin De Bruyne (Manchester City)	(Brazil) Neymar (Barcelona/Paris Saint-Germain) (Portugal) Cristiano Ronaldo (Real Madrid) (Argentina) Lionel Messi (Barcelona)	(France) Zinedine Zidane (Real Madrid)
2018	(Belgium) Thibaut Courtois (Chelsea/Real Madrid)	(Brazil) Marcelo (Real Madrid) (Spain) Sergio Ramos (Real Madrid) (France) Raphaël Varane (Real Madrid) (Uruguay) Diego Godín (Atlético Madrid)	(Croatia) Luka Modrić (Real Madrid) (Belgium) Eden Hazard (Chelsea) (France) Antoine Griezmann (Atlético Madrid)	(France) Kylian Mbappé (Paris Saint-Germain) (Portugal) Cristiano Ronaldo (Real Madrid/Juventus) (Argentina) Lionel Messi (Barcelona)	Didier Deschamps (France)
2019	(Brazil) Alisson (Liverpool)	(Netherlands) Matthijs de Ligt (Ajax/Juventus) (Spain) Sergio Ramos (Real Madrid) (Netherlands) Virgil van Dijk (Liverpool) (England) Trent Alexander-Arnold (Liverpool)	(Belgium) Kevin De Bruyne (Manchester City) (Netherlands) Frenkie de Jong (Ajax/Barcelona) (Portugal) Bernardo Silva (Manchester City)	(Senegal) Sadio Mané (Liverpool) (Portugal) Cristiano Ronaldo (Juventus) (Argentina) Lionel Messi (Barcelona)	(Germany) Jürgen Klopp (Liverpool)
2020	(Germany) Manuel Neuer (Bayern Munich)	(England) Trent Alexander-Arnold (Liverpool) (Spain) Sergio Ramos (Real Madrid) (Netherlands) Virgil van Dijk (Liverpool) (Canada) Alphonso Davies (Bayern Munich)	(Germany) Joshua Kimmich (Bayern Munich) (Spain) Thiago (Bayern Munich/Liverpool) (Belgium) Kevin De Bruyne (Manchester City)	(Portugal) Cristiano Ronaldo (Juventus) (Poland) Robert Lewandowski (Bayern Munich) (Argentina) Lionel Messi (Barcelona)	(Germany) Hansi Flick (Bayern Munich)
2021	(Italy) Gianluigi Donnarumma (Milan/Paris Saint-Germain)	(Morocco) Achraf Hakimi (Inter Milan/Paris Saint-Germain) (Italy) Leonardo Bonucci (Juventus) (Portugal) Rúben Dias (Manchester City) (Canada) Alphonso Davies (Bayern Munich)	(Italy) Jorginho (Chelsea) (Argentina) Lionel Messi (Barcelona/Paris Saint-Germain) (Belgium) Kevin De Bruyne (Manchester City)	(Portugal) Cristiano Ronaldo (Juventus/Manchester United) (Poland) Robert Lewandowski (Bayern Munich) (France) Kylian Mbappé (Paris Saint-Germain)	(Germany) Thomas Tuchel (Chelsea)
2022	(Belgium) Thibaut Courtois (Real Madrid)	(Morocco) Achraf Hakimi (Paris Saint-Germain) (Croatia) Joško Gvardiol (RB Leipzig) (Netherlands) Virgil van Dijk (Liverpool) (Canada) Alphonso Davies (Bayern Munich)	(Argentina) Lionel Messi (Paris Saint-Germain) (Croatia) Luka Modrić (Real Madrid) (Belgium) Kevin De Bruyne (Manchester City)	(France) Kylian Mbappé (Paris Saint-Germain) (France) Karim Benzema (Real Madrid) (Norway) Erling Haaland (Borussia Dortmund/Manchester City)	–
2023	(Brazil) Ederson (Manchester City)	(Portugal) Rúben Dias (Manchester City) (South Korea) Kim Min-jae (Napoli/Bayern Munich) (Canada) Alphonso Davies (Bayern Munich)	(Spain) Rodri (Manchester City) (England) Jude Bellingham (Borussia Dortmund/Real Madrid) (Belgium) Kevin De Bruyne (Manchester City) (Argentina) Lionel Messi (Paris Saint-Germain/Inter Miami)	(England) Harry Kane (Tottenham Hotspur/Bayern Munich) (Norway) Erling Haaland (Manchester City) (France) Kylian Mbappé (Paris Saint-Germain)	–
2024	(Argentina) Emiliano Martínez (Aston Villa)	(Spain) Dani Carvajal (Real Madrid) (Portugal) Rúben Dias (Manchester City) (Germany) Antonio Rüdiger (Real Madrid) (Canada) Alphonso Davies (Bayern Munich)	(Spain) Rodri (Manchester City) (England) Jude Bellingham (Real Madrid) (Germany) Toni Kroos (Real Madrid)	(Spain) Lamine Yamal (Barcelona) (Norway) Erling Haaland (Manchester City) (Brazil) Vinícius Júnior (Real Madrid)	–
2025	(Italy) Gianluigi Donnarumma (Paris Saint-Germain/Manchester City)	(Morocco) Achraf Hakimi (Paris Saint-Germain) (Ecuador) Willian Pacho (Paris Saint-Germain) (Portugal) Nuno Mendes (Paris Saint-Germain)	(Spain) Lamine Yamal (Barcelona) (Spain) Pedri (Barcelona) (Portugal) Vitinha (Paris Saint-Germain)	(France) Ousmane Dembélé (Paris Saint-Germain) (England) Harry Kane (Bayern Munich) (Norway) Erling Haaland (Manchester City) (France) Kylian Mbappé (Real Madrid)	–

=== Statistics ===
Multiple appearances (2017–present)
Player	Apps	Years
(Argentina) Lionel Messi	7	2017, 2018, 2019, 2020, 2021, 2022, 2023
(Belgium) Kevin De Bruyne	6	2017, 2019, 2020, 2021, 2022, 2023
(Portugal) Cristiano Ronaldo	5	2017, 2018, 2019, 2020, 2021
(Canada) Alphonso Davies	5	2020, 2021, 2022, 2023, 2024
(France) Kylian Mbappé	5	2018, 2021, 2022, 2023, 2025
(Spain) Sergio Ramos	4	2017, 2018, 2019, 2020
(Norway) Erling Haaland	4	2022, 2023, 2024, 2025
(Croatia) Luka Modrić	3	2017, 2018, 2022
(Netherlands) Virgil van Dijk	3	2019, 2020, 2022
(Portugal) Rúben Dias	3	2021, 2023, 2024
(Morocco) Achraf Hakimi	3	2021, 2022, 2025
(Brazil) Marcelo	2	2017, 2018
(England) Trent Alexander-Arnold	2	2019, 2020
(Italy) Leonardo Bonucci	2	2017, 2021
(Poland) Robert Lewandowski	2	2020, 2021
(Belgium) Thibaut Courtois	2	2018, 2022
(Germany) Toni Kroos	2	2017, 2024
(Spain) Rodri	2	2023, 2024
(England) Jude Bellingham	2	2023, 2024
(Italy) Gianluigi Donnarumma	2	2021, 2025
(England) Harry Kane	2	2023, 2025
(Spain) Lamine Yamal	2	2024, 2025

Multiple appearances by club
Club	Apps	Players
(Spain) Real Madrid	23	12
(France) Paris Saint-Germain	18	10
(England) Manchester City	18	7
(Germany) Bayern Munich	13	7
(Spain) Barcelona	10	5
(Italy) Juventus	9	5
(England) Liverpool	8	5
(England) Chelsea	3	3
(Netherlands) Ajax	2	2
(Spain) Atlético Madrid	2	2
(Italy) Milan	2	2
(Germany) Borussia Dortmund	2	2

Multiple appearances by nationality
Nationality	Apps	Players
Spain	11	6
Portugal	11	5
France	9	5
Belgium	9	3
Argentina	8	2
Brazil	7	6
Italy	6	4
England	6	3
Germany	5	4
Canada	5	1
Netherlands	4	3
Croatia	4	2
Norway	4	1
Morocco	3	1
Poland	2	1

=== All-time Men's Dream Team (2021) ===
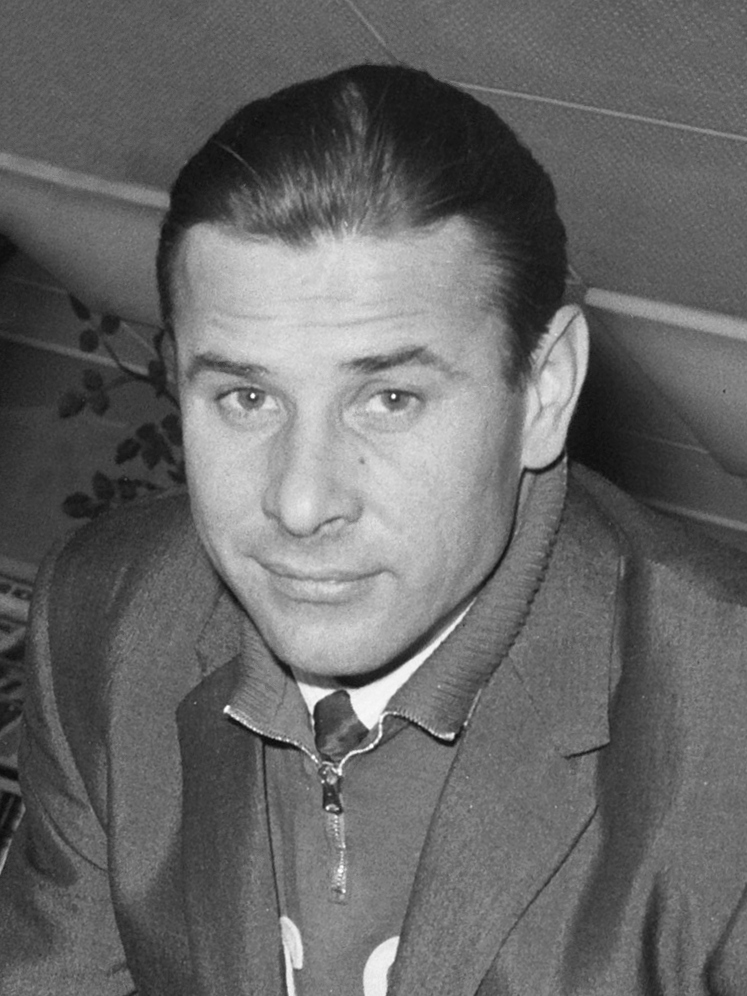
Lev Yashin was selected as the goalkeeper for the All-time Men's Dream Team as well as the Men Team of the Century, both times for the World's and Europe's first team.

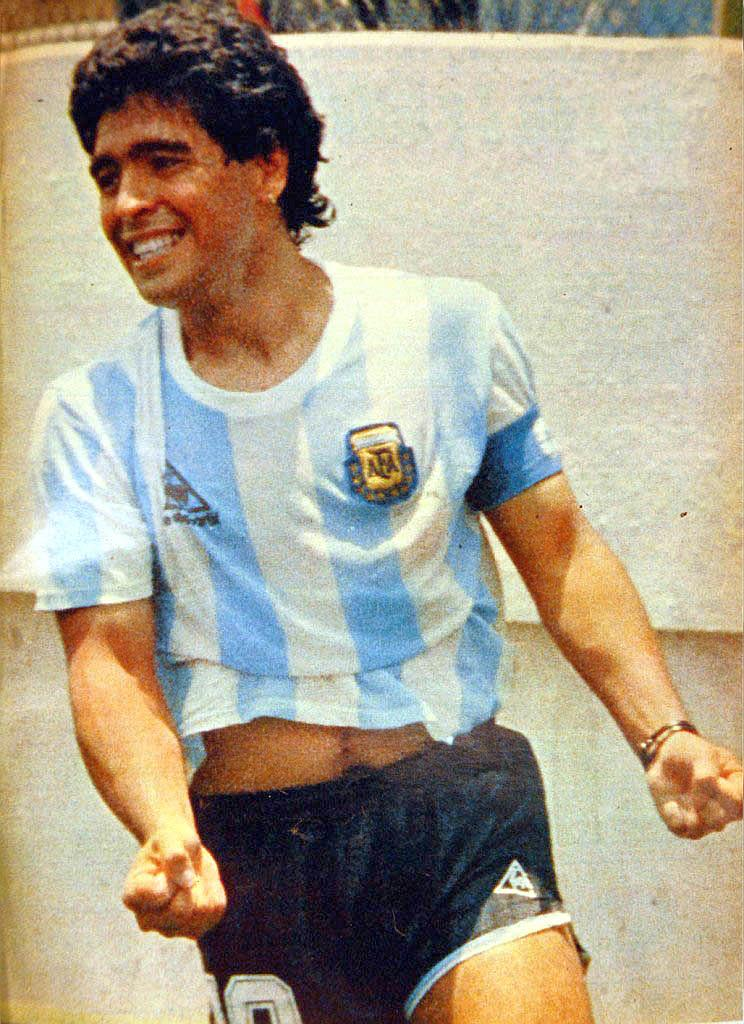
The Argentine Diego Maradona was part of the World and South America team.

Continent	Goalkeeper	Defenders	Midfielders	Forwards
World	(Soviet Union) Lev Yashin	(Brazil) Cafu (West Germany) Franz Beckenbauer (Italy) Franco Baresi (Italy) Paolo Maldini	(Spain) Xavi (Argentina) Diego Maradona (Netherlands) Johan Cruyff	(Portugal) Cristiano Ronaldo (Brazil) Pelé (Argentina) Lionel Messi
World B	(Italy) Gianluigi Buffon	(Brazil) Carlos Alberto Torres (England) Bobby Moore (Argentina) Daniel Passarella (Brazil) Roberto Carlos	(Germany) Lothar Matthäus (France) Zinedine Zidane (France) Michel Platini	(Brazil) Ronaldo (West Germany) Gerd Müller (Argentina) (Spain) Alfredo Di Stéfano
Europe	(Soviet Union) Lev Yashin	(Germany) Philipp Lahm (West Germany) Franz Beckenbauer (Italy) Franco Baresi (Italy) Paolo Maldini	(Spain) Xavi (France) Zinedine Zidane (France) Michel Platini	(Netherlands) Johan Cruyff (West Germany) Gerd Müller (Portugal) Cristiano Ronaldo
South America	(Argentina) Amadeo Carrizo	(Brazil) Cafu (Chile) Elías Figueroa (Argentina) Daniel Passarella (Brazil) Roberto Carlos	(Brazil) Didi (Argentina) Diego Maradona (Brazil) Garrincha	(Argentina) Alfredo Di Stéfano (Brazil) Pelé (Argentina) Lionel Messi
CONCACAF	(Mexico) Antonio Carbajal	(Mexico) Carlos Salcedo (Mexico) Claudio Suárez (Mexico) Rafael Márquez	(Mexico) Andrés Guardado (Costa Rica) Bryan Ruiz (Mexico) Raúl Cárdenas (Mexico) Luis de la Fuente	(Panama) Julio Dely Valdés (Mexico) Hugo Sánchez (United States) Clint Dempsey
Africa	(Cameroon) Thomas N'Kono	(Ghana) Samuel Kuffour (Cameroon) Rigobert Song (Morocco) Noureddine Naybet	(Ivory Coast) Yaya Touré (Nigeria) Nwankwo Kanu (Nigeria) Jay-Jay Okocha (Ghana) Abedi Pele	(Cameroon) Samuel Eto'o (Liberia) George Weah (Ivory Coast) Didier Drogba
Asia	(Saudi Arabia) Mohamed Al-Deayea	(Iran) Mehdi Mahdavikia (South Korea) Hong Myung-bo (Japan) Yasuhiko Okudera	(China) Wu Lei (Japan) Shinji Kagawa (Australia) Mile Jedinak (South Korea) Park Ji-sung	(South Korea) Son Heung-min (Saudi Arabia) Majed Abdullah (South Korea) Cha Bum-kun
Oceania	(New Zealand) Stefan Marinovic	(New Zealand) Ryan Nelsen (New Zealand) Tommy Smith (New Zealand) Winston Reid	(New Zealand) Ryan Thomas (New Zealand) Steve Sumner (New Zealand) Marco Rojas (Fiji) Roy Krishna	(New Zealand) Rory Fallon (New Zealand) Chris Wood (New Zealand) Wynton Rufer

=== 19th Century Men's Dream Team (2021) ===
The XI covers the 1863-1900 period.

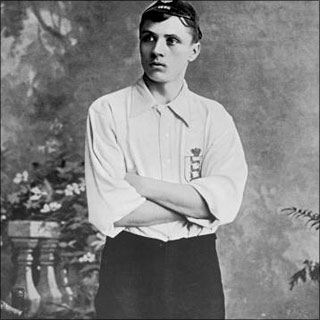
Steve Bloomer was selected as right inside forward for the All-time Men's Dream Team of the XIX Century.

Continent	Goalkeeper	Defenders	Midfielders	Forwards
World	(Wales) James Trainer	(England) Robert Holmes (Scotland) Walter Arnott	(Scotland) Neilly Gibson (Scotland) James Cowan (England) Ernest Needham	(England) Steve Bloomer (England) John Goodall (England) William Bassett (Scotland) Gilbert Oswald Smith (Scotland) John Bell

=== 20th Century Men's Dream Team (2000) ===
The XIs cover the 1901-2000 period .

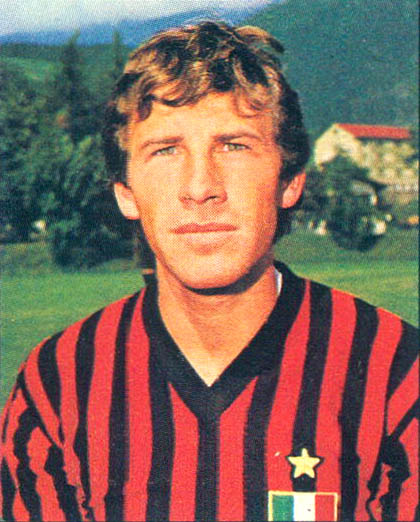
Franco Baresi

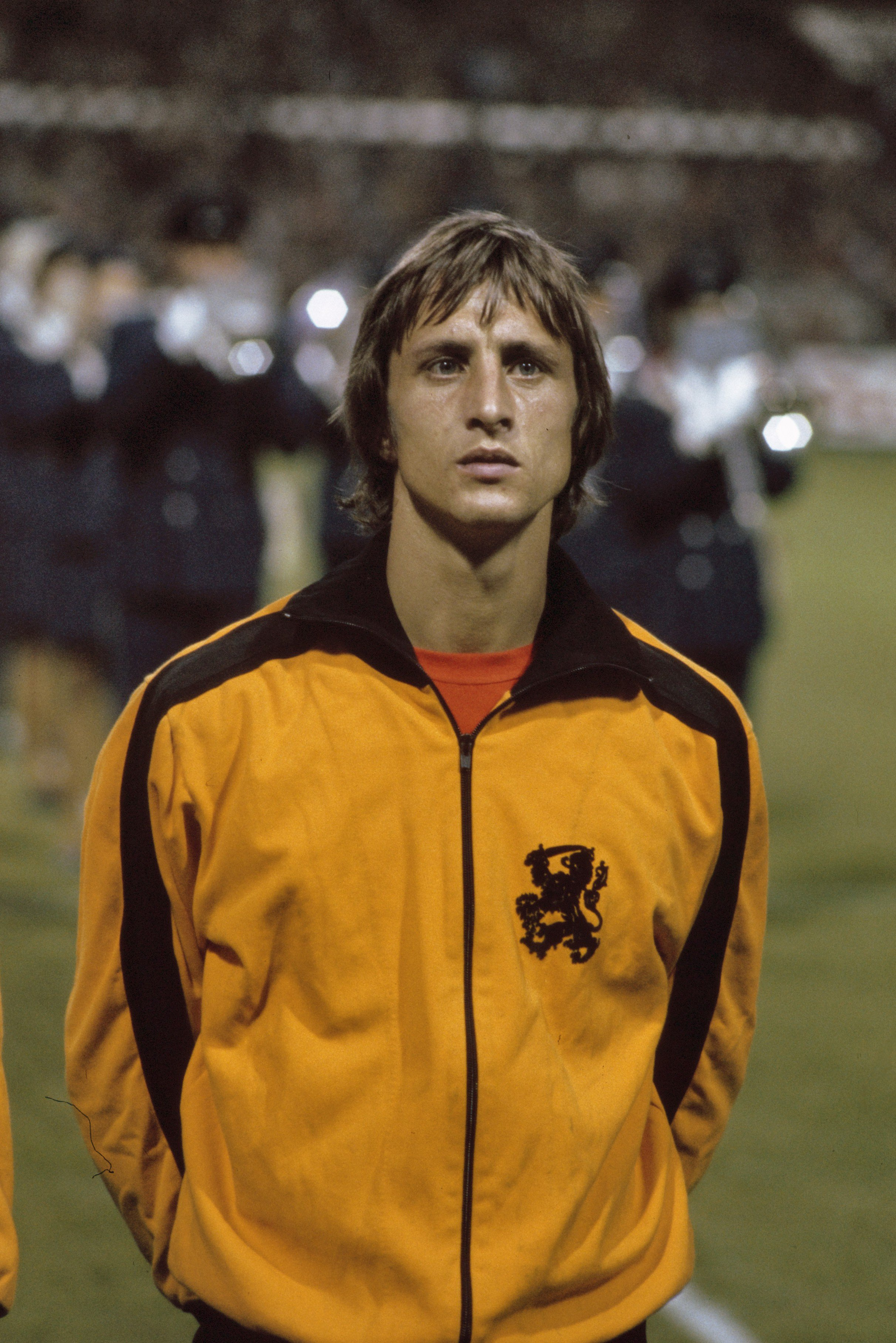
Johan Cruyff

Continent	Goalkeeper	Defenders	Midfielders	Forwards
World	(Soviet Union) Lev Yashin	(Italy) Franco Baresi (West Germany) Franz Beckenbauer (England) Bobby Moore	(Germany) Lothar Matthäus (Argentina) Diego Maradona (France) Michel Platini (Netherlands) Johan Cruyff	(Hungary) (Spain) Ferenc Puskás (Brazil) Pelé (Argentina) (Spain) Alfredo Di Stéfano
Europe	(Soviet Union) Lev Yashin	(Italy) Franco Baresi (West Germany) Franz Beckenbauer (England) Bobby Moore	(Germany) Lothar Matthäus (England) Bobby Charlton (France) Michel Platini (Netherlands) Johan Cruyff	(Hungary) (Spain) Ferenc Puskás (West Germany) Gerd Müller (Portugal) Eusébio
South America	(Argentina) Amadeo Carrizo	(Brazil) Carlos Alberto (Chile) Elías Figueroa (Argentina) Daniel Passarella (Brazil) Nílton Santos	(Brazil) Didi (Argentina) Diego Maradona (Brazil) Zico	(Brazil) Garrincha (Brazil) Pelé (Argentina) Alfredo Di Stéfano
CONCACAF	(Mexico) Antonio Carbajal	(Mexico) Gustavo Peña (United States) Marcelo Balboa (Mexico) Claudio Suárez (Mexico) Ramón Ramírez	(United States) Thomas Dooley (Mexico) Raúl Cárdenas (Mexico) Luis de la Fuente	(Panama) Julio Dely Valdés (Mexico) Hugo Sánchez (Mexico) Carlos Hermosillo
Africa	(Cameroon) Thomas N'Kono	(Ghana) Samuel Kuffour (Morocco) Noureddine Naybet (Egypt) Hany Ramzy (Nigeria) Taribo West	(Algeria) Lakhdar Belloumi (Nigeria) Finidi George (Ghana) Abedi Pele	(Algeria) Rabah Madjer (Liberia) George Weah (Cameroon) Roger Milla
Asia	(Saudi Arabia) Mohamed Al-Deayea	(Japan) Masami Ihara (South Korea) Hong Myung-bo (Japan) Yasuhiko Okudera	(Saudi Arabia) Saeed Al-Owairan (South Korea) Kim Joo-sung (Iran) Ali Parvin (Japan) Kazuyoshi Miura	(South Korea) Cha Bum-kun (Iran) Ali Daei (Saudi Arabia) Majed Abdullah
Oceania	(Australia) Mark Bosnich	(Australia) Joe Marston (Australia) Milan Ivanović (New Caledonia) Antoine Kombouaré (Australia) Alan Davidson	(Australia) Ned Zelic (Australia) Paul Okon (Australia) Robert Slater	(Australia) John Kosmina (Australia) Frank Farina (New Zealand) Wynton Rufer

=== Men Team of the Decade (2011–2020) ===
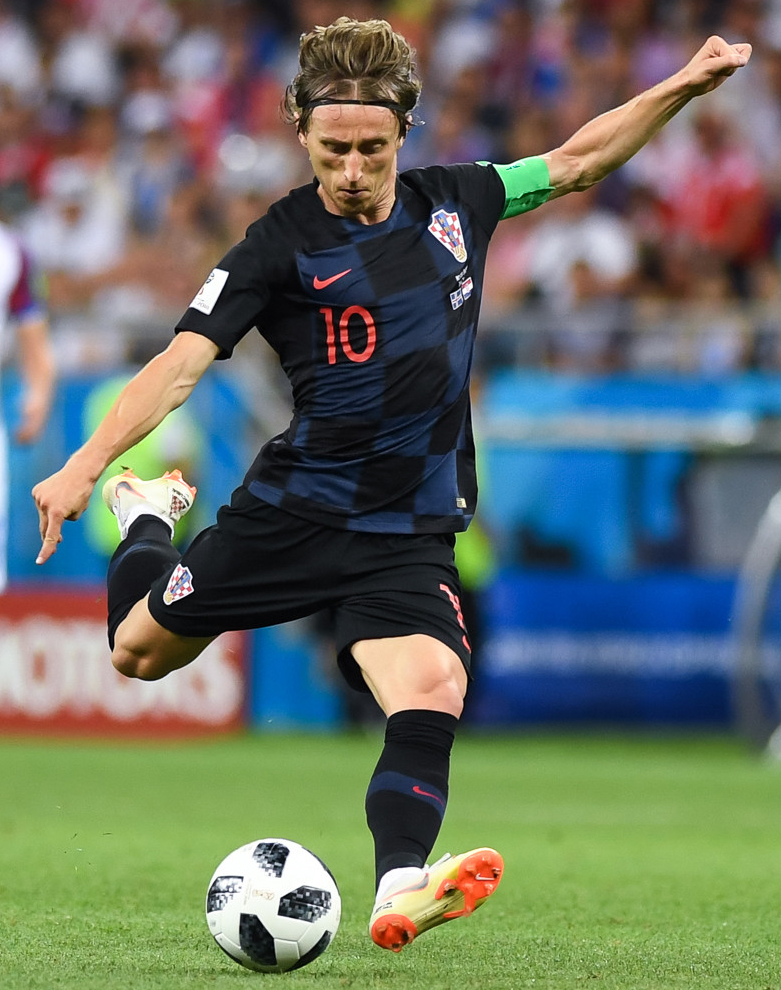
Luka Modrić is the only Croatian in the Men Team of the Decade.

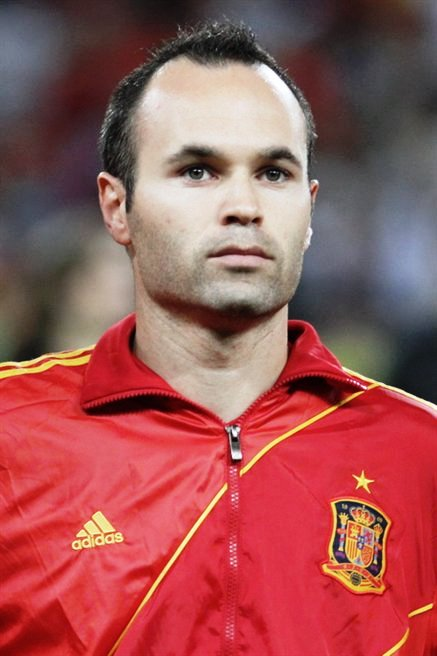
Andrés Iniesta

Confederation	Goalkeeper	Defenders	Midfielders	Forwards
World	(Germany) Manuel Neuer	(Germany) Philipp Lahm (Spain) Sergio Ramos (Netherlands) Virgil van Dijk (Brazil) Marcelo	(Germany) Toni Kroos (Spain) Andrés Iniesta (Croatia) Luka Modrić	(Portugal) Cristiano Ronaldo (Poland) Robert Lewandowski (Argentina) Lionel Messi
UEFA	(Germany) Manuel Neuer	(Germany) Philipp Lahm (Spain) Sergio Ramos (Netherlands) Virgil van Dijk (Italy) Leonardo Bonucci	(Germany) Toni Kroos (Spain) Andrés Iniesta (Croatia) Luka Modrić (Belgium) Kevin De Bruyne	(Portugal) Cristiano Ronaldo (Poland) Robert Lewandowski
CONMEBOL	(Brazil) Júlio César	(Brazil) Dani Alves (Brazil) Thiago Silva (Argentina) Javier Mascherano (Brazil) Marcelo	(Brazil) Casemiro (Argentina) Ángel Di María (Argentina) Lionel Messi	(Argentina) Sergio Agüero (Peru) Paolo Guerrero (Brazil) Neymar
CONCACAF	(Costa Rica) Keylor Navas	(Mexico) Carlos Salcedo (United States) John Brooks (Mexico) Héctor Moreno (Jamaica) Kemar Lawrence	(Mexico) Andrés Guardado (United States) Michael Bradley (Costa Rica) Bryan Ruiz	(Mexico) Hirving Lozano (Mexico) Javier Hernández (United States) Clint Dempsey
CAF	(Nigeria) Vincent Enyeama	(Egypt) Ahmed Fathy (Morocco) Medhi Benatia (Senegal) Kalidou Koulibaly (Ivory Coast) Eric Bailly	(Ivory Coast) Yaya Touré (Ghana) André Ayew (Algeria) Riyad Mahrez	(Senegal) Sadio Mané (Gabon) Pierre-Emerick Aubameyang (Egypt) Mohamed Salah
AFC	(Australia) Mathew Ryan	(Saudi Arabia) Mohammed Al-Breik (Japan) Takehiro Tomiyasu (Japan) Maya Yoshida (Thailand) Theerathon Bunmathan	(China) Wu Lei (Japan) Keisuke Honda (Saudi Arabia) Salem Al-Dawsari	(South Korea) Son Heung-min (Qatar) Almoez Ali (Syria) Omar Al Somah
OFC	(New Zealand) Stefan Marinovic	(New Zealand) Ryan Nelsen (New Zealand) Tommy Smith (New Zealand) Winston Reid	(New Zealand) Ryan Thomas (New Zealand) Ivan Vicelich (New Zealand) Marco Rojas (Fiji) Roy Krishna	(Papua New Guinea) Raymond Gunemba (New Zealand) Chris Wood (French Polynesia) Teaonui Tehau

== Women's winners ==
IFFHS Women World Team
- Sport: Association football
- Awarded for: Best performing women players of the calendar year
- Presented by: International Federation of Football History & Statistics

History
- First award: 2017
- Editions: 9
- Most wins: (France) Wendie Renard (7 appearances)
- Website: iffhs.com/en

=== List of winners ===
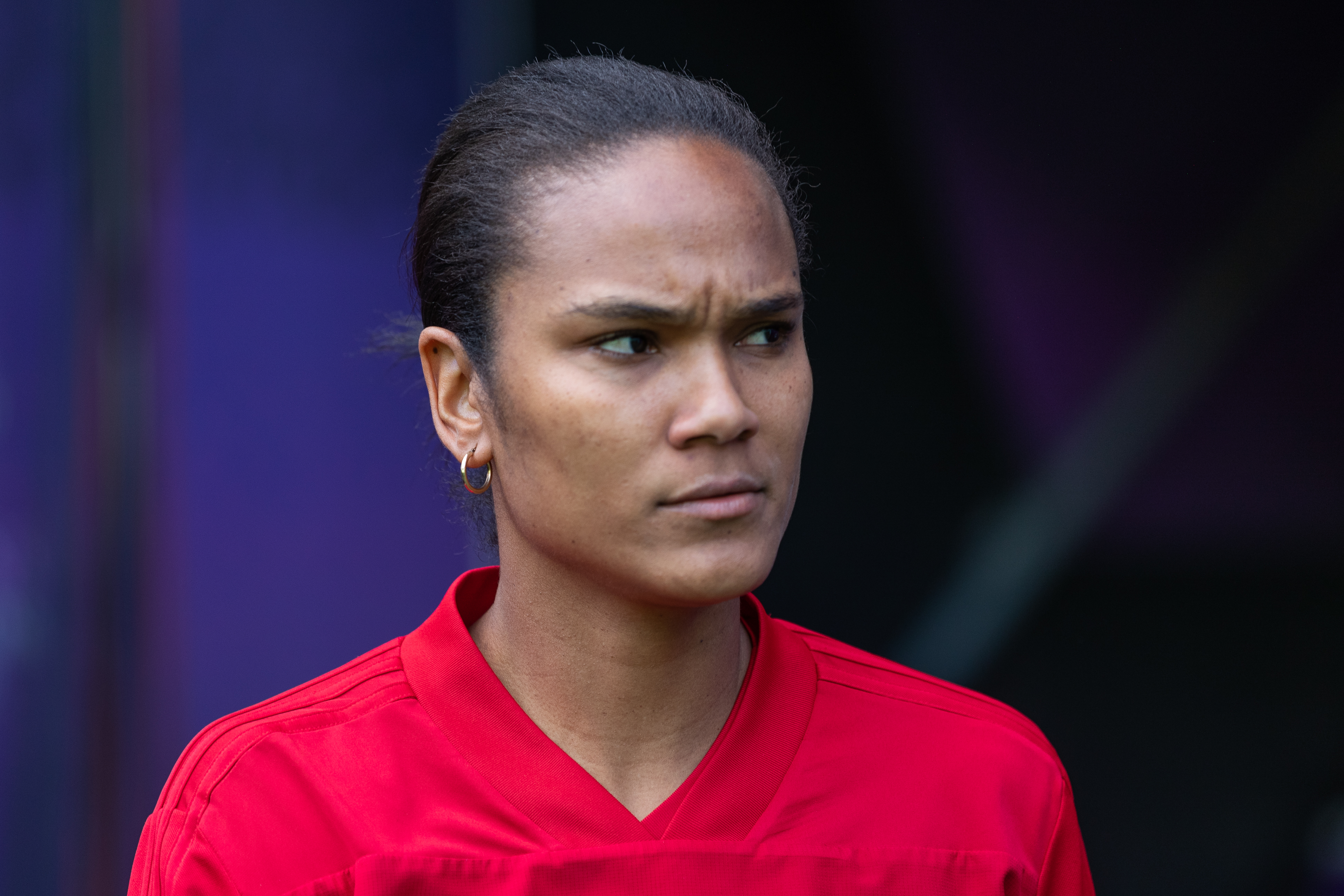
Wendie Renard has made a record seven appearances in the women's world team.

In 2017, IFFHS started to nominate a world team of the year. Players marked bold won the IFFHS World's Best Player (2020–present).

Year	Goalkeeper (club)	Defenders (clubs)	Midfielders (clubs)	Forwards (clubs)	Coach (team)
2017	(France) Sarah Bouhaddi (Lyon)	(Netherlands) Anouk Dekker (Montpellier) (France) Wendie Renard (Lyon) (England) Steph Houghton (Manchester City) (England) Lucy Bronze (Lyon)	(Germany) Dzsenifer Marozsán (Lyon) (United States) Carli Lloyd (Houston Dash) (Denmark) Pernille Harder (VfL Wolfsburg)	(Netherlands) Lieke Martens (Barcelona) (United States) Alex Morgan (Orlando Pride) (Australia) Sam Kerr (Sky Blue FC)	Sarina Wiegman (Netherlands)
2018	(France) Sarah Bouhaddi (Lyon)	(France) Amel Majri (Lyon) (France) Wendie Renard (Lyon) (Japan) Saki Kumagai (Lyon) (England) Lucy Bronze (Lyon)	(Germany) Dzsenifer Marozsán (Lyon) (France) Amandine Henry (Lyon) (Brazil) Marta (Orlando Pride)	(United States) Alex Morgan (Orlando Pride) (Norway) Ada Hegerberg (Lyon) (Denmark) Pernille Harder (VfL Wolfsburg)	(France) Reynald Pedros (Lyon)
2019	(Netherlands) Sari van Veenendaal (Arsenal/Atlético Madrid)	(United States) Crystal Dunn (North Carolina Courage) (France) Wendie Renard (Lyon) (United States) Julie Ertz (Chicago Red Stars) (England) Lucy Bronze (Lyon)	(Germany) Dzsenifer Marozsán (Lyon) (France) Amandine Henry (Lyon) (United States) Rose Lavelle (Washington Spirit)	(United States) Alex Morgan (Orlando Pride) (Norway) Ada Hegerberg (Lyon) (United States) Megan Rapinoe (Reign FC)	(England) Jill Ellis (United States)
2020	(France) Sarah Bouhaddi (Lyon)	(England) Lucy Bronze (Lyon/Manchester City) (France) Wendie Renard (Lyon) (Germany) Lena Goeßling (VfL Wolfsburg) (France) Sakina Karchaoui (Montpellier/Lyon)	(Japan) Saki Kumagai (Lyon) (Germany) Alexandra Popp (VfL Wolfsburg) (Germany) Dzsenifer Marozsán (Lyon)	(France) Delphine Cascarino (Lyon) (Netherlands) Vivianne Miedema (Arsenal) (Denmark) Pernille Harder (VfL Wolfsburg/Chelsea)	(France) Jean-Luc Vasseur (Lyon)
2021	(Chile) Christiane Endler (Paris Saint-Germain/Lyon)	(Canada) Ashley Lawrence (Paris Saint-Germain) (France) Wendie Renard (Lyon) (Sweden) Magdalena Eriksson (Chelsea) (Spain) Mapi León (Barcelona)	(Spain) Aitana Bonmatí (Barcelona) (Spain) Alexia Putellas (Barcelona) (Netherlands) Lieke Martens (Barcelona)	(Norway) Caroline Graham Hansen (Barcelona) (Australia) Sam Kerr (Chelsea) (Spain) Jennifer Hermoso (Barcelona)	(Spain) Lluís Cortés (Barcelona)
2022	(Chile) Christiane Endler (Lyon)	(England) Lucy Bronze (Manchester City/Barcelona) (England) Leah Williamson (Arsenal) (France) Wendie Renard (Lyon) (France) Selma Bacha (Lyon)	(Germany) Lena Oberdorf (VfL Wolfsburg) (Spain) Alexia Putellas (Barcelona) (Spain) Aitana Bonmatí (Barcelona)	(England) Beth Mead (Arsenal) (United States) Alex Morgan (San Diego Wave) (Germany) Alexandra Popp (VfL Wolfsburg)	–
2023	(England) Mary Earps (Manchester United)	(Sweden) Amanda Ilestedt (Paris Saint-Germain/Arsenal) (France) Wendie Renard (Lyon) (Spain) Olga Carmona (Real Madrid)	(Germany) Lena Oberdorf (VfL Wolfsburg) (Spain) Aitana Bonmatí (Barcelona) (Japan) Hinata Miyazawa (MyNavi Sendai/Manchester United) (Colombia) Linda Caicedo (Real Madrid)	(Spain) Jennifer Hermoso (Pachuca) (Australia) Sam Kerr (Chelsea) (Spain) Salma Paralluelo (Barcelona)	–
2024	(United States) Alyssa Naeher (Chicago Red Stars)	(Brazil) Tarciane (Corinthians/Houston Dash) (Iceland) Glódís Perla Viggósdóttir (Bayern Munich) (United States) Naomi Girma (San Diego Wave)	(Spain) Aitana Bonmatí (Barcelona) (United States) Lindsey Horan (Lyon) (Norway) Caroline Graham Hansen (Barcelona)	(United States) Trinity Rodman (Washington Spirit) (United States) Sophia Smith (Portland Thorns) (Spain) Salma Paralluelo (Barcelona) (Zambia) Barbra Banda (Orlando Pride)	–
2025	(England) Hannah Hampton (Chelsea)	(England) Lucy Bronze (Chelsea (Spain) Irene Paredes (Barcelona) (England) Leah Williamson (Arsenal) (Germany) Franziska Kett (Bayern Munich)	(Spain) Aitana Bonmatí (Barcelona) (Spain) Patricia Guijarro (Barcelona) (Spain) Alexia Putellas (Barcelona)	(Spain) Mariona Caldentey (Arsenal) (England) Alessia Russo (Arsenal) (Germany) Klara Bühl (Bayern Munich)	–

=== Statistics ===
Multiple appearances (2017–present)
Player	Apps	Years
(France) Wendie Renard	7	2017, 2018, 2019, 2020, 2021, 2022, 2023
(England) Lucy Bronze	6	2017, 2018, 2019, 2020, 2022, 2025
(Spain) Aitana Bonmatí	5	2021, 2022, 2023, 2024, 2025
(Germany) Dzsenifer Marozsán	4	2017, 2018, 2019, 2020
(United States) Alex Morgan	4	2017, 2018, 2019, 2022
(France) Sarah Bouhaddi	3	2017, 2018, 2020
(Denmark) Pernille Harder	3	2017, 2018, 2020
(Australia) Sam Kerr	3	2017, 2021, 2023
(Spain) Alexia Putellas	3	2021, 2022, 2025
(Chile) Christiane Endler	2	2021, 2022
(Norway) Ada Hegerberg	2	2018, 2019
(France) Amandine Henry	2	2018, 2019
(Spain) Jennifer Hermoso	2	2021, 2023
(Japan) Saki Kumagai	2	2018, 2020
(Netherlands) Lieke Martens	2	2017, 2021
(Germany) Lena Oberdorf	2	2022, 2023
(Germany) Alexandra Popp	2	2020, 2022
(Norway) Caroline Graham Hansen	2	2021, 2024
(Spain) Salma Paralluelo	2	2023, 2024
(England) Leah Williamson	2	2022, 2025

Multiple appearances by club
Club	Apps	Players
(France) Lyon	30	13
(Spain) Barcelona	19	10
(England) Arsenal	8	7
(Germany) VfL Wolfsburg	8	4
(England) Chelsea	6	5
(United States) Orlando Pride	5	3
(France) Paris Saint-Germain	3	3
(Germany) Bayern Munich	3	3
(England) Manchester City	3	2
(England) Manchester United	2	2
(France) Montpellier	2	2
(Spain) Real Madrid	2	2
(United States) Houston Dash	2	2
(United States) Chicago Red Stars	2	2
(United States) Washington Spirit	2	2
(United States) San Diego Wave	2	2

Multiple appearances by nationality
Nationality	Apps	Players
Spain	17	9
France	15	7
United States	14	11
England	13	6
Germany	11	6
Netherlands	4	4
Norway	4	2
Japan	3	2
Australia	3	1
Denmark	3	1
Sweden	2	2
Brazil	2	2
Chile	2	1

=== All-time Women's Dream Team (2021) ===
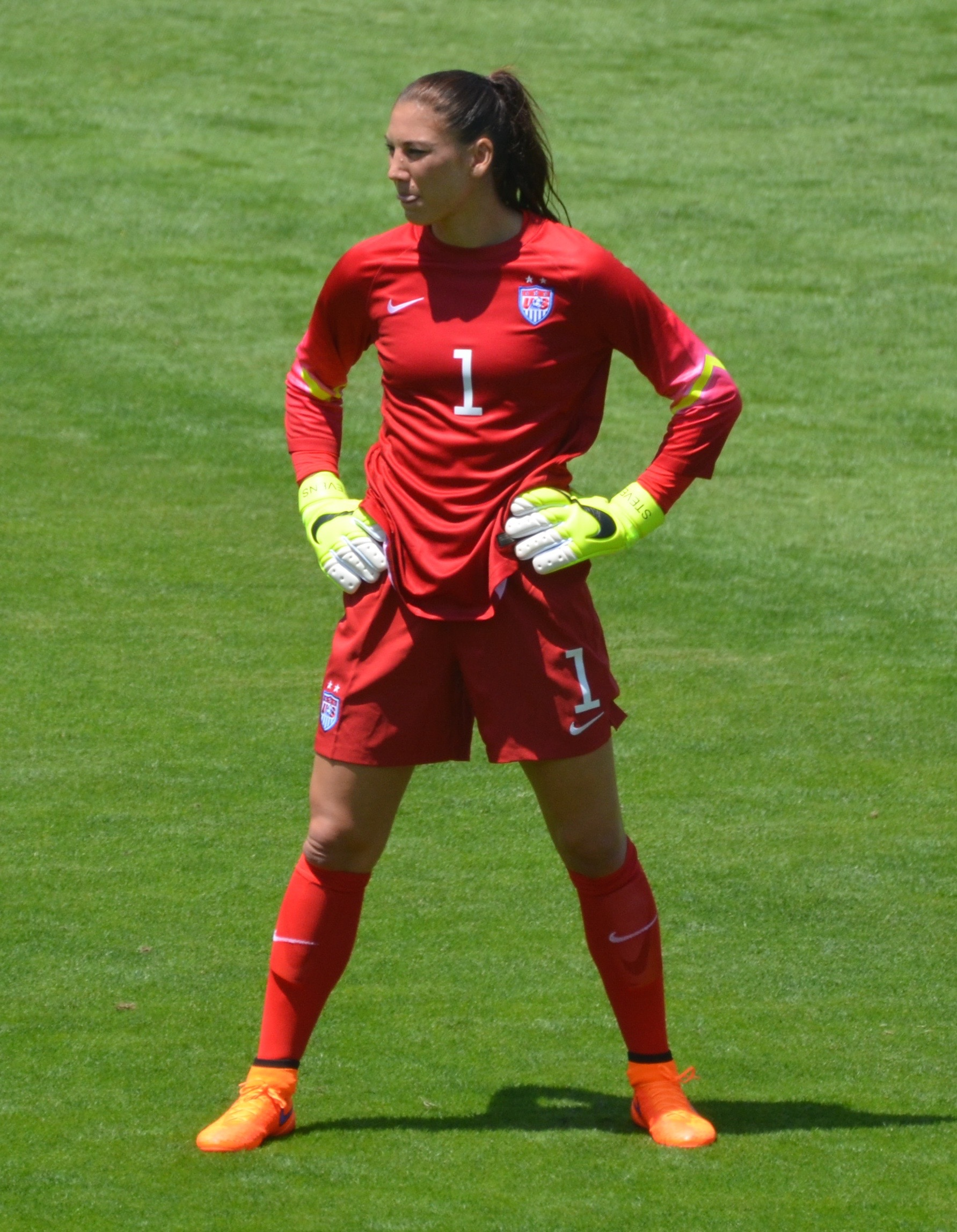
Hope Solo

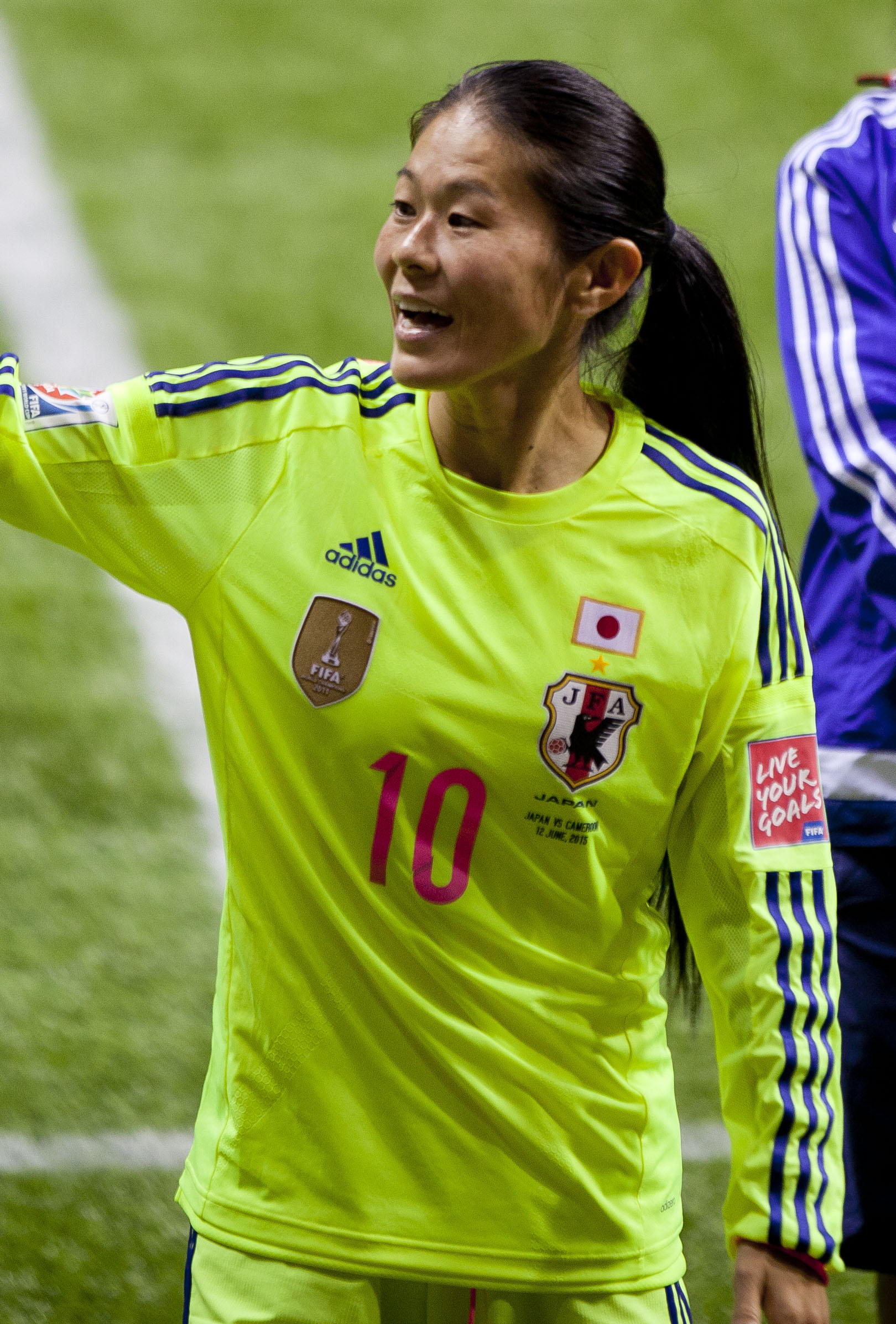
Homare Sawa

Continent	Goalkeeper	Defenders	Midfielders	Forwards
World	(United States) Hope Solo	(England) Lucy Bronze (France) Wendie Renard (United States) Christie Pearce (United States) Joy Fawcett	(Germany) Dzsenifer Marozsán (Japan) Homare Sawa (Brazil) Marta	(United States) Megan Rapinoe (United States) Mia Hamm (United States) Alex Morgan
World B	(Germany) Nadine Angerer	(Germany) Ariane Hingst (Sweden) Nilla Fischer (Japan) Saki Kumagai (Norway) Hege Riise	(United States) Michelle Akers (United States) Kristine Lilly (Brazil) Formiga	(United States) Abby Wambach (United States) Carli Lloyd (Germany) Birgit Prinz
Europe	(Germany) Nadine Angerer	(England) Lucy Bronze (France) Wendie Renard (Sweden) Nilla Fischer (Norway) Linda Medalen	(Germany) Nadine Keßler (Germany) Dzsenifer Marozsán (France) Camille Abily	(Sweden) Lotta Schelin (Norway) Ada Hegerberg (Germany) Birgit Prinz
South America	(Chile) Christiane Endler	(Brazil) Fabiana (Brazil) Aline (Brazil) Elane (Brazil) Tamires	(Brazil) Formiga (Brazil) Sissi (Brazil) Roseli	(Brazil) Pretinha (Brazil) Cristiane (Brazil) Marta
CONCACAF	(United States) Hope Solo	(United States) Kelley O'Hara (United States) Joy Fawcett (United States) Christie Pearce (United States) Ali Krieger	(Costa Rica) Shirley Cruz (United States) Carli Lloyd (United States) Megan Rapinoe	(United States) Abby Wambach (United States) Mia Hamm (United States) Alex Morgan
Africa	(Cameroon) Annette Ngo Ndom	(Nigeria) Onome Ebi (South Africa) Janine van Wyk (Nigeria) Florence Omagbeni (Nigeria) Ngozi Ezeocha	(Nigeria) Perpetua Nkwocha (Nigeria) Mercy Akide (Cameroon) Gabrielle Onguéné	(Cameroon) Gaëlle Enganamouit (Nigeria) Asisat Oshoala (Malawi) Tabitha Chawinga
Asia	(Australia) Lydia Williams	(Australia) Ellie Carpenter (Australia) Cheryl Salisbury (Japan) Saki Kumagai (China) Fan Yunjie	(Japan) Homare Sawa (South Korea) Ji So-yun (Japan) Aya Miyama	(China) Liu Ailing (Australia) Samantha Kerr (China) Sun Wen
Oceania	(New Zealand) Erin Nayler	(New Zealand) Rebekah Stott (New Zealand) Rebecca Smith (New Zealand) Abby Erceg	(New Zealand) Ria Percival (New Zealand) Hayley Bowden (New Zealand) Katie Duncan (New Zealand) Betsy Hassett	(New Zealand) Ali Riley (New Zealand) Amber Hearn (New Zealand) Sarah Gregorius

=== Women Team of the Century (1901–2000) ===
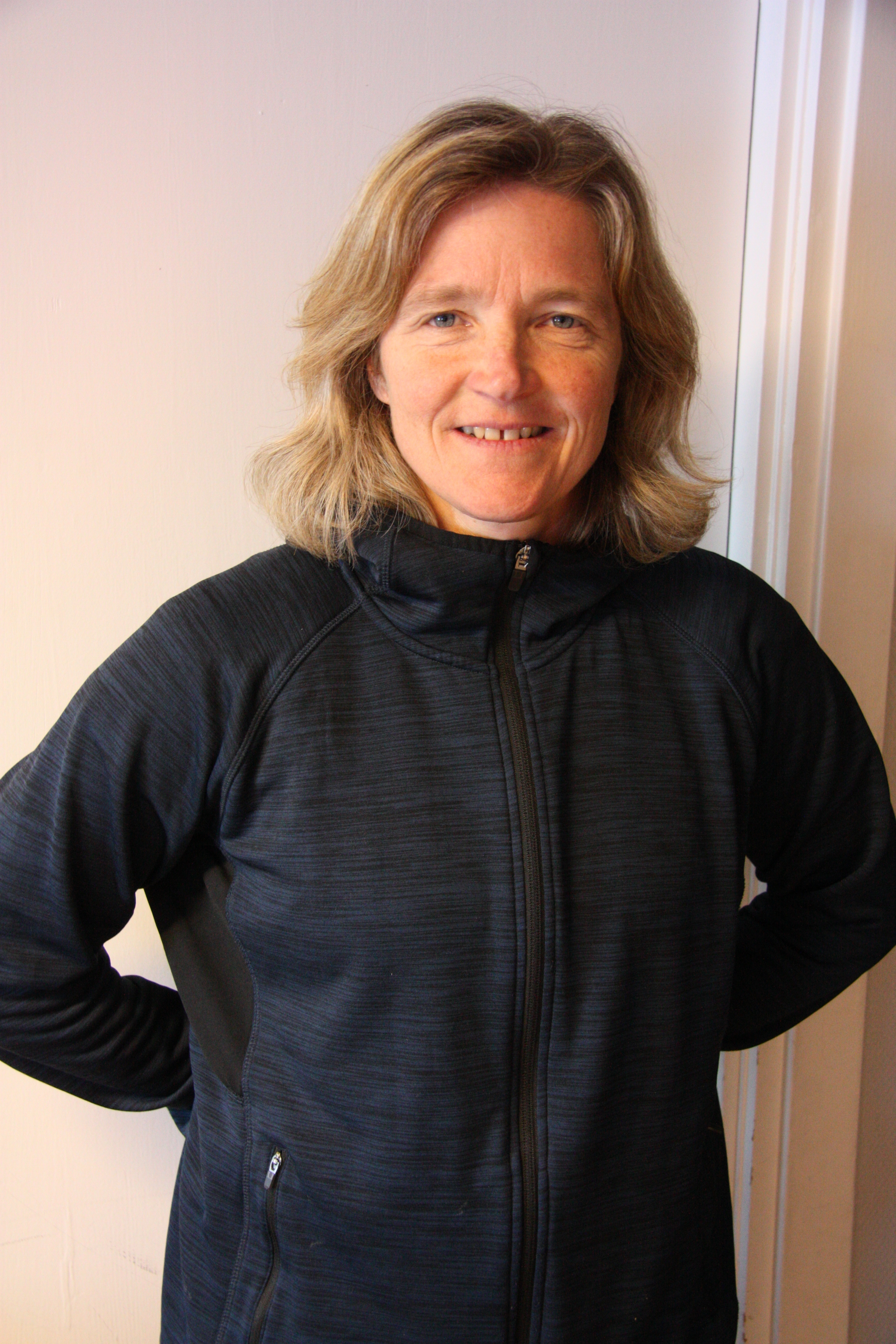
Hege Riise

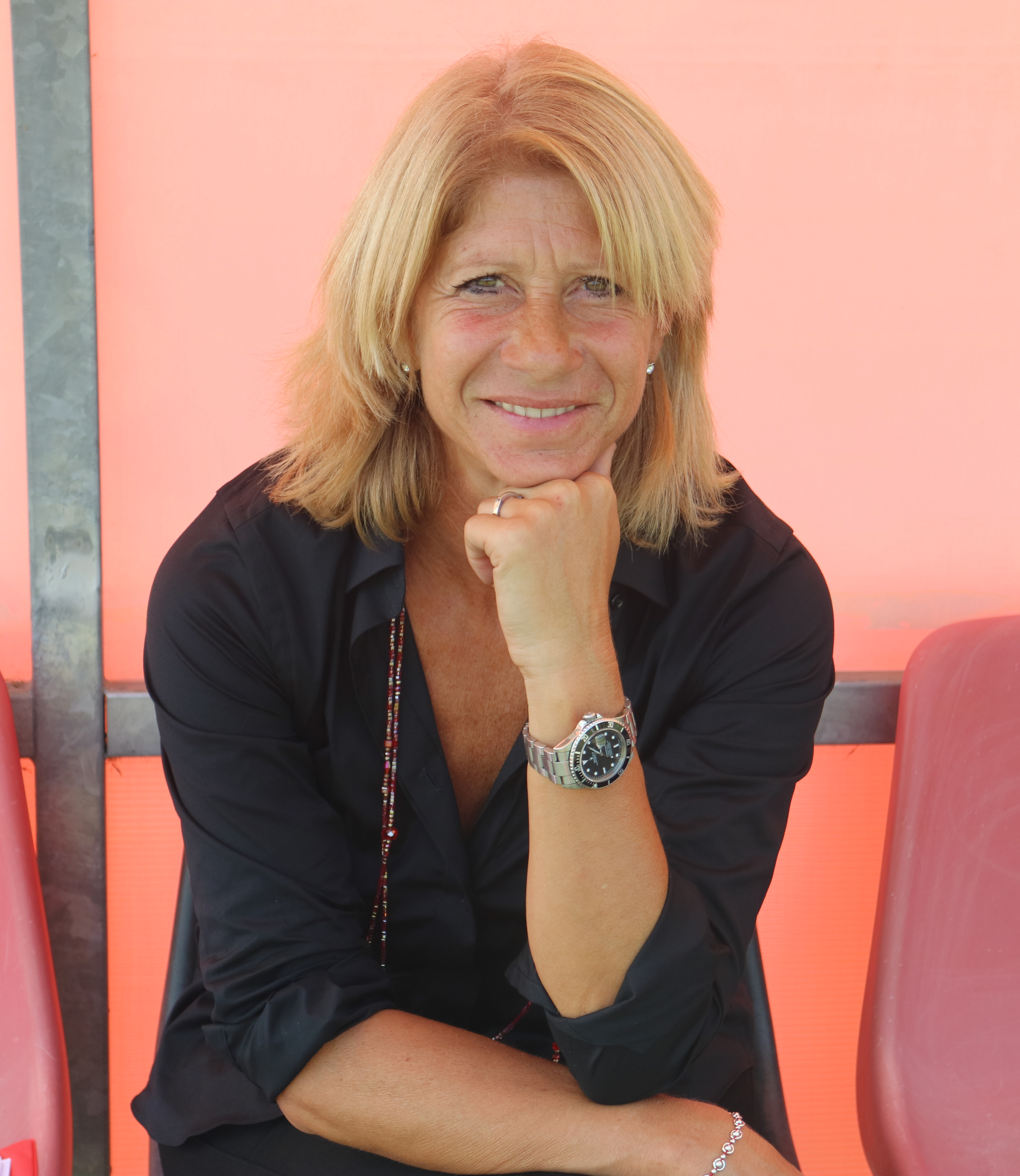
Carolina Morace

Continent	Goalkeeper	Defenders	Midfielders	Forwards
World	(United States) Briana Scurry	(Norway) Hege Riise (United States) Joy Fawcett (Norway) Linda Medalen	(United States) Kristine Lilly (Brazil) Sissi (United States) Michelle Akers (China) Liu Ailing	(Italy) Carolina Morace (United States) Mia Hamm (Germany) Heidi Mohr
Europe	(Sweden) Elisabeth Leidinge	(Norway) Gro Espeseth (Norway) Linda Medalen (Norway) Hege Riise	(Germany) Silvia Neid (Germany) Martina Voss (Norway) Heidi Støre (Sweden) Pia Sundhage	(Italy) Carolina Morace (Germany) Heidi Mohr (Italy) Elisabetta Vignotto
South America	(Brazil) Meg	(Brazil) Nenê (Brazil) Elane (Brazil) Fanta	(Brazil) Roseli (Brazil) Márcia Taffarel (Brazil) Formiga (Brazil) Sissi	(Brazil) Pretinha (Brazil) Michael Jackson (Brazil) Kátia
CONCACAF	(United States) Briana Scurry	(Mexico) María Eugenia Rubio (United States) Joy Fawcett (Canada) Geri Donelly	(United States) Kristine Lilly (United States) Julie Foudy (Mexico) Alicia Vargas (United States) Michelle Akers	(Canada) Charmaine Hooper (United States) Mia Hamm (United States) Carin Jennings-Gabarra
Africa	(Nigeria) Ann Chiejine	(Nigeria) Mavis Ogun (Nigeria) Florence Omagbeni (Nigeria) Ngozi Ezeocha	(Nigeria) Mercy Akide (Nigeria) Nkiru Okosieme (South Africa) Fikhile Sitole (Ghana) Vivian Mensah	(Nigeria) Rita Nwadike (Nigeria) Ngozi Eucharia Uche (Ghana) Nana Gyamfuah
Asia	(China) Gao Hong	(China) Fan Yunjie (China) Niu Lijie (Japan) Yumi Obe	(Japan) Etsuko Handa (Japan) Futaba Kioka (Japan) Homare Sawa (China) Sun Qingmei	(China) Liu Ailing (China) Sun Wen (South Korea) Lee Myung-hwa
Oceania	(New Zealand) Leslie King	(Australia) Sonia Gegenhuber (Australia) Cheryl Salisbury (Australia) Anissa Tann	(New Zealand) Maureen Jacobson (Australia) Julie Murray (New Zealand) Michele Cox (Australia) Julie Dolan	(Australia) Linda Hughes (Australia) Sue Monteath (New Zealand) Marilyn Marshall

=== Women Team of the Decade (2011–2020) ===
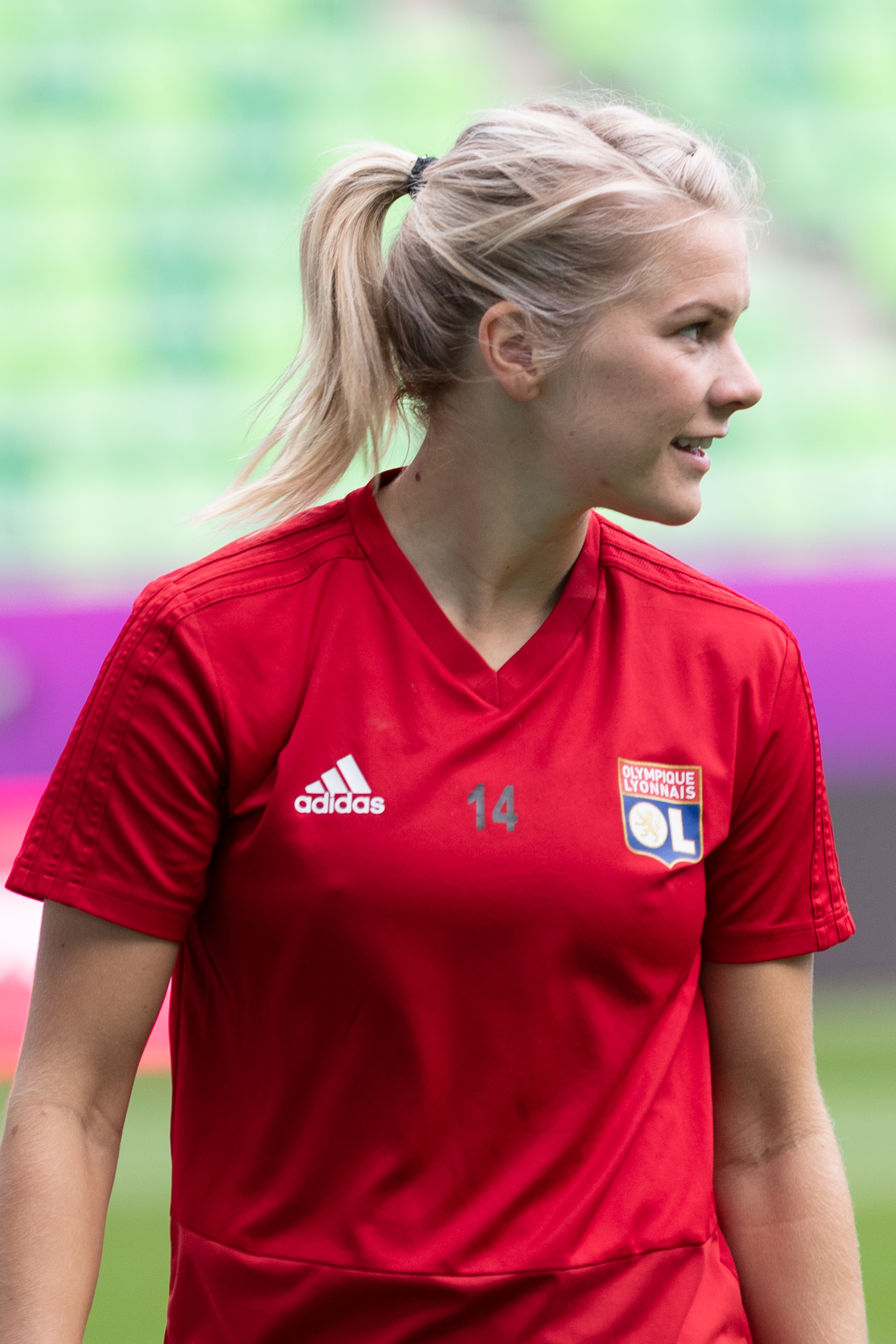
Ada Hegerberg, part of the Women Team of the Decade (2011–2020).

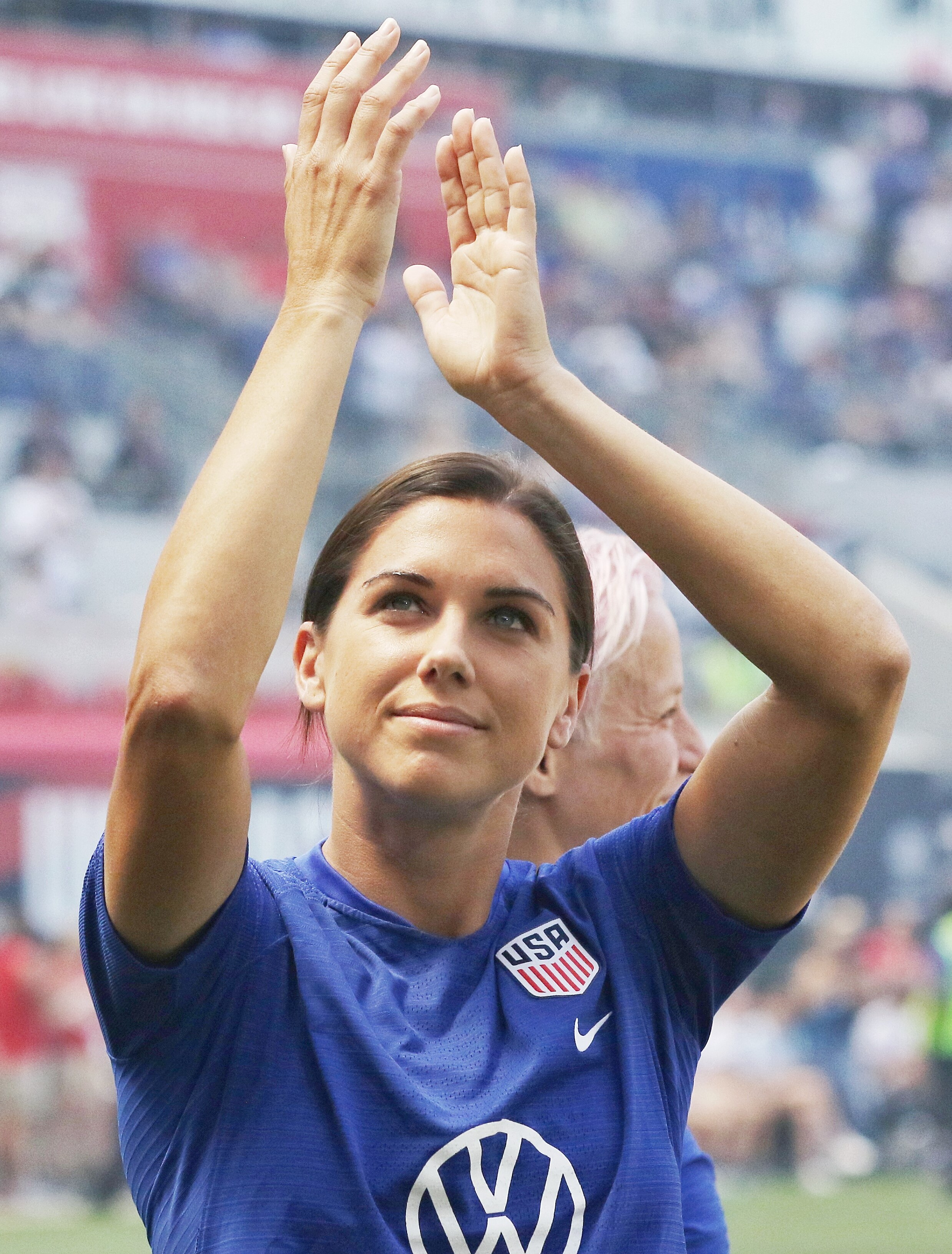
Alex Morgan

Confederation	Goalkeeper	Defenders	Midfielders	Forwards
World	(United States) Hope Solo	(England) Lucy Bronze (France) Wendie Renard (Japan) Saki Kumagai (Sweden) Nilla Fischer	(Germany) Lena Goeßling (United States) Carli Lloyd (Germany) Dzsenifer Marozsán	(Brazil) Marta (Norway) Ada Hegerberg (United States) Alex Morgan
UEFA	(Germany) Nadine Angerer	(England) Lucy Bronze (France) Wendie Renard (Germany) Lena Goeßling (Sweden) Nilla Fischer	(France) Amandine Henry (Germany) Nadine Keßler (Germany) Dzsenifer Marozsán	(Netherlands) Lieke Martens (Norway) Ada Hegerberg (Denmark) Pernille Harder
CONMEBOL	(Chile) Christiane Endler	(Brazil) Fabiana (Brazil) Érika (Chile) Carla Guerrero (Brazil) Tamires	(Brazil) Formiga (Brazil) Debinha (Argentina) Estefanía Banini	(Colombia) Yoreli Rincón (Brazil) Cristiane (Brazil) Marta
CONCACAF	(United States) Hope Solo	(United States) Kelley O'Hara (Canada) Kadeisha Buchanan (United States) Becky Sauerbrunn (United States) Ali Krieger	(Costa Rica) Shirley Cruz (United States) Carli Lloyd (Canada) Christine Sinclair	(United States) Tobin Heath (United States) Alex Morgan (United States) Megan Rapinoe
CAF	(Cameroon) Annette Ngo Ndom	(Nigeria) Osinachi Ohale (South Africa) Janine van Wyk (Cameroon) Estelle Johnson (Nigeria) Onome Ebi	(Nigeria) Ngozi Okobi-Okeoghene (Ghana) Elizabeth Addo (Cameroon) Gabrielle Onguéné	(Cameroon) Gaëlle Enganamouit (Nigeria) Asisat Oshoala (Malawi) Tabitha Chawinga
AFC	(Australia) Lydia Williams	(Australia) Ellie Carpenter (Japan) Saki Kumagai (Australia) Alanna Kennedy (Australia) Stephanie Catley	(Japan) Homare Sawa (Japan) Aya Miyama (South Korea) Ji So-yun	(China) Li Ying (Australia) Samantha Kerr (Japan) Mana Iwabuchi
OFC	(New Zealand) Erin Nayler	(New Zealand) Rebekah Stott (New Zealand) Rebecca Smith (New Zealand) Abby Erceg	(New Zealand) Ria Percival (New Zealand) Hayley Bowden (New Zealand) Katie Duncan (New Zealand) Betsy Hassett (New Zealand) Ali Riley	(New Zealand) Amber Hearn (New Zealand) Sarah Gregorius

== See also ==
- International Federation of Football History & Statistics
- IFFHS World's Best International Goal Scorer
- IFFHS World's Best Top Goal Scorer
- IFFHS World's Best National Coach
- IFFHS World's Best Club Coach
- IFFHS World's Best Goalkeeper
- IFFHS World's Best Player
- IFFHS World's Best Club
