= Fabio Cinetti =

Italian footballer

Personal information
- Date of birth: 21 October 1973 (age 53)
- Place of birth: Milan, Italy
- Height: 1.76 m (5 ft 9 1/2 in)
- Position: Midfielder

Senior career*
Years	Team	Apps	(Gls)
1992–1993	Monza	1	(0)
1993–1994	Vastese	31	(1)
1994–1995	Monza	25	(1)
1995–1996	Internazionale	5	(0)
1996–1997	Torino	8	(0)
1997–1998	Chievo	16	(0)
1998	Livorno	0	(0)
1999	Como	4	(0)
1999–2000	Lecco	23	(1)
2000–2002	Nice	30	(0)
2002–2003	Nice (B team)		
2003–2004	Seregno	9	(0)
2004–2005	Lecco	17	(0)
2005–2006	Oggiono	25	(2)
2006–2007	Olginatese	19	(0)
2007–2008	Caravaggese	21	(0)
- * Club domestic league appearances and goals

Fabio Cinetti (born 21 October 1973 in Milan) is an Italian retired professional footballer who played as a midfielder.
