= Silvestro Centofanti =

Italian politician

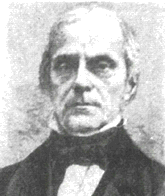
Silvestro Centofanti

Silvestro Centofanti (1794–1880) was an Italian politician. He served in the Senate of the Kingdom of Sardinia. He was a recipient of the Order of Saints Maurice and Lazarus.

== Bibliography ==
- Treves, Piero (1979). "CENTOFANTI, Silvestro". Dizionario Biografico degli Italiani (in Italian). Vol. 23.
