= Alessandro Pedroni =

Italian footballer (born 1971)

Personal information
- Date of birth: 30 January 1971 (age 55)
- Place of birth: Orzinuovi, Italy
- Height: 1.76 m (5 ft 9 1/2 in)
- Position: Defender

Senior career*
Years	Team	Apps	(Gls)
1989–1995	Cremonese	95	(4)
1990–1991	→ Treviso (loan)	26	(0)
1991–1992	→ Vastese (loan)	32	(0)
1995–1996	Internazionale	3	(0)
1996–1999	Torino	4	(0)
1996–1997	→ Cremonese (loan)	24	(0)
1997–1998	→ Monza (loan)	20	(1)
1999	→ Varese (loan)	5	(0)
1999–2000	Cremonese	21	(0)
2000–2001	Lecco	9	(0)
2001–2002	Pergocrema	16	(0)
- * Club domestic league appearances and goals

Alessandro Pedroni (born 30 January 1971) is an Italian former professional footballer who played as a defender.
