= Roberto Carlos =

Brazilian footballer (born 1973)

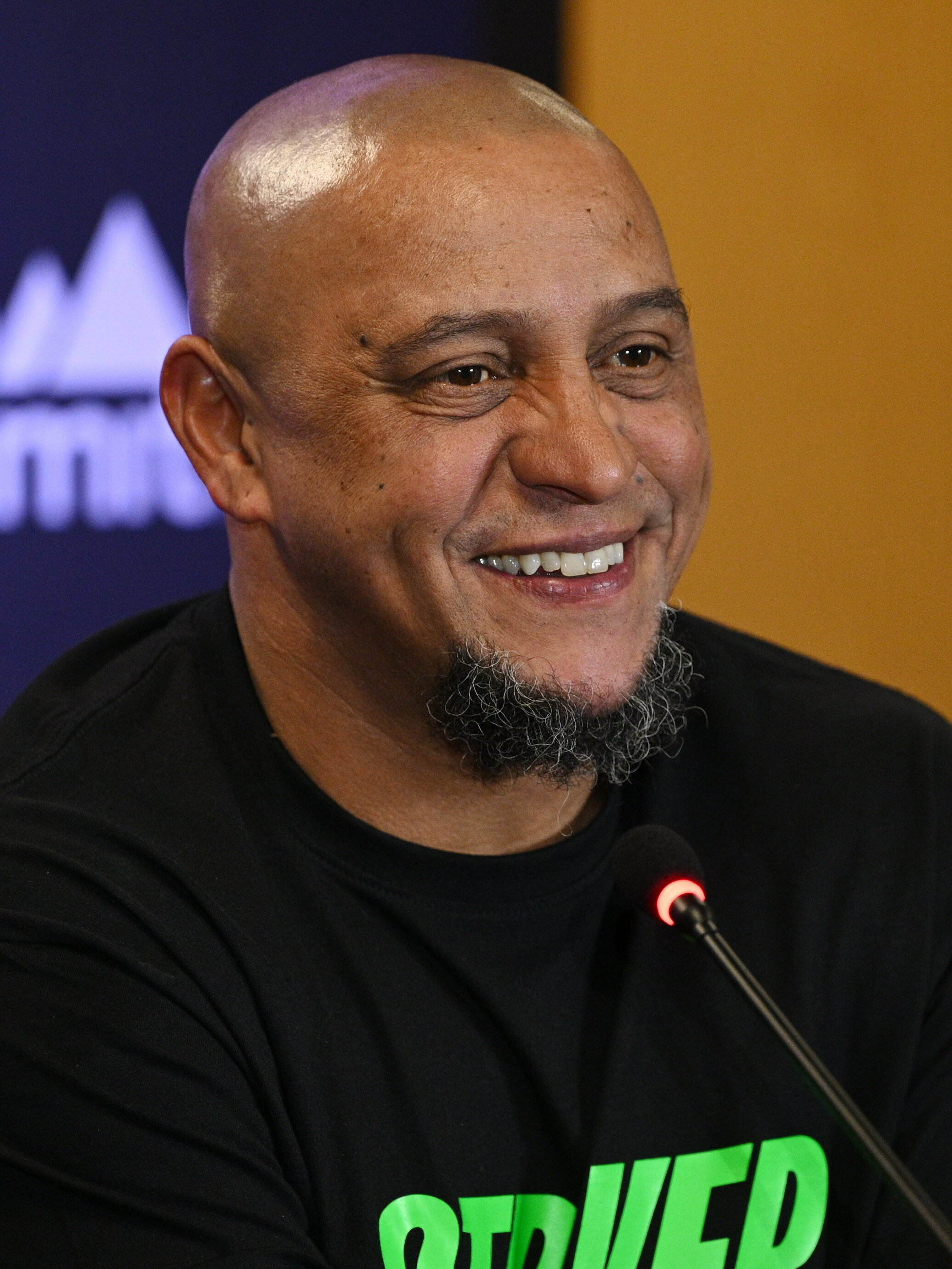
- Roberto Carlos in 2023

Personal information
- Full name: Roberto Carlos da Silva Rocha
- Date of birth: 10 April 1973 (age 53)
- Place of birth: Garça, São Paulo, Brazil
- Height: 1.68 m (5 ft 6 in)
- Position: Left-back

Youth career
- 1988–1991: União São João

Senior career*
Years	Team	Apps	(Gls)
1991–1993	União São João	21	(3)
1992–1993	→ Atlético Mineiro (loan)	3	(0)
1993–1995	Palmeiras	44	(3)
1995–1996	Inter Milan	30	(5)
1996–2007	Real Madrid	370	(47)
2007–2009	Fenerbahçe	65	(6)
2010–2011	Corinthians	35	(1)
2011–2012	Anzhi Makhachkala	25	(4)
2015–2016	Delhi Dynamos	3	(0)
Total		605	(71)

International career
1996	Brazil U23	6	(0)
1992–2006	Brazil	125	(10)

Managerial career
- 2012: Anzhi Makhachkala (coach)
- 2013–2014: Sivasspor
- 2015: Akhisarspor
- 2015: Delhi Dynamos
Medal record
Men's Football
Representing Brazil
FIFA World Cup
Winner	2002 Korea/Japan
Runner-up	1998 France
FIFA Confederations Cup
Winner	1997 Saudi Arabia
Runner-up	1999 Mexico
Copa América
Winner	1997 Bolivia
Winner	1999 Paraguay
Runner-up	1995 Uruguay
Olympic Games
Bronze medal – third place	1996 Atlanta	Team
FIFA U–20 World Cup
Runner-up	1991 Portugal
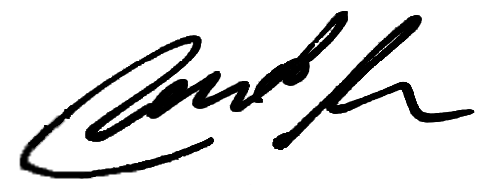
Website	www.robertocarlosofficial.com
Signature
- * Club domestic league appearances and goals

Roberto Carlos da Silva Rocha (born 10 April 1973), often recognized as Roberto Carlos (Brazilian Portuguese: [ʁoˈbɛʁtu ˈkaʁlus]) and sometimes RC3, (Note: An abbreviation of his initials and common shirt number.) is a Brazilian former professional footballer. He has been described as the "most offensive-minded left-back in the history of the game", and one of the greatest full-backs in history. In 1997, he was runner-up in the FIFA World Player of the Year and in 2002, was runner-up for the Ballon d'Or. He is primarily known for his long career at Real Madrid and constant presence on the Brazilian national team.

He started his career in Brazil as a forward but spent most of his career as a left-back. At club level, Roberto Carlos joined Real Madrid from Inter Milan in 1996 to spend 11 highly successful seasons, playing 584 matches in all competitions and scoring 71 goals. At Real, he won four La Liga titles and the UEFA Champions League three times. In April 2013, Marca named him in their "Best Foreign Eleven in Real Madrid's History". He is one of the few players to have made over 1,100 professional career appearances at clubs and international levels.

Roberto Carlos made his debut for the Brazil national team in 1992. He played in three World Cups, helping the team reach the final in 1998 in France, and win the 2002 tournament in South Korea and Japan. He was named in the FIFA World Cup All-Star Team in 1998 and 2002. With Brazil, he is especially known for a bending 40-yard free kick against France in the inaugural match of Tournoi de France 1997. With 125 caps, he has made the fourth-most appearances for his national team. He was chosen for the FIFA World Cup Dream Team in a 2002 FIFA poll.

He took up management and was named as the manager of Sivasspor in the Turkish Süper Lig in June 2013. He resigned as head coach in December 2014. From January to June 2015, he was manager of Akhisarspor. Although he announced his retirement from playing at the age of 39 in 2012, he briefly came out of retirement in 2015 when he was appointed player/manager of Indian Super League club Delhi Dynamos.

== Club career ==
=== Early years ===
Roberto Carlos began his professional career playing for União São João, a football club based in Araras in the state of São Paulo. In 1992, despite playing at what was seen as a lesser club and only being 19 years old, he was called up for the Brazil national team. In August 1992, aged 19, he joined Atlético Mineiro on loan and went on the club's tour of Europe. The tour consisted of the B team, as the club was prioritising the first Copa CONMEBOL in South America at the same time. The tour served as a test for many players, and those who stood out could be integrated definitively to the main group. Roberto Carlos did not participate in the first two games in Italy but played the full match against Lleida in Spain on 27 August in a match for the Ciutat de Lleida Trophy. He remained in the team for the next two games, held in Logroño, against Logroñés and Athletic Bilbao. Before retiring from football in 2014, Roberto Carlos thanked Atlético Mineiro for the opportunity.

In 1993, Roberto Carlos joined Palmeiras, where he played for two seasons, winning two consecutive Brazilian league titles.

=== Inter Milan ===
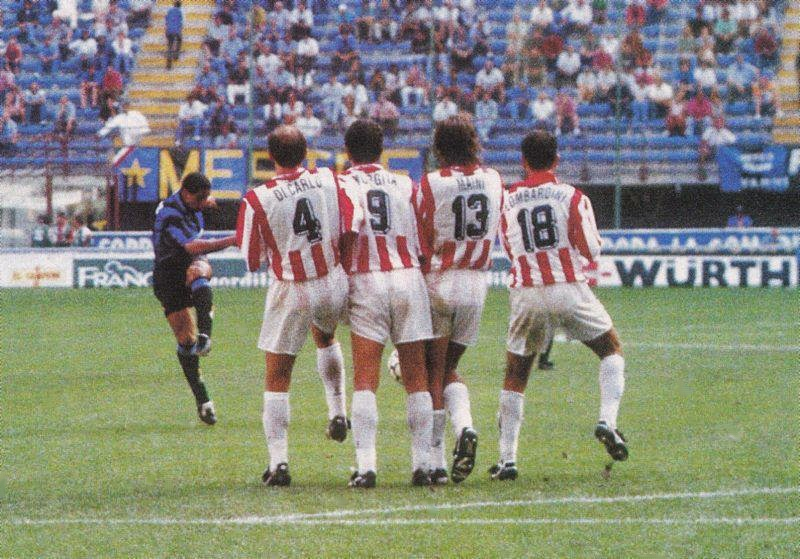
Roberto Carlos scoring a 30-yard free-kick for Inter Milan against Vicenza in 1995.

Roberto Carlos almost signed for Aston Villa in 1995 following the Umbro Cup match between Sweden and Brazil at Villa Park. The Aston Villa chairman, Doug Ellis was so impressed with his performance that he brought him to the boardroom and mutually agreeable terms were reached. However, manager Brian Little did not share his chairman's enthusiasm and, instead, he moved to Inter Milan, in the Serie A, playing one season for the Nerazzurri. He scored a 30-yard free-kick on his debut in a 1–0 win over Vicenza but his season at Inter was unsuccessful, with the club finishing seventh in Serie A.

In an interview with FourFourTwo in a May 2005 issue, Roberto Carlos said that the then-coach of Inter, Roy Hodgson, wanted him to play as a winger, but Roberto Carlos wanted to play as a left back. Roberto Carlos spoke to Inter owner Massimo Moratti "to see if he could sort things out and it soon became clear that the only solution was to leave".

=== Real Madrid ===
I owe all clubs for which I worked, even to my little União São João, because we must never forget our origins. But I owe my coming to Spain to Atlético Mineiro, who gave me the opportunity to work on the team in 1992, a trip to the country. So I made a point to make it clear and I thank this important club for me to have opened the doors here in Europe.

— Roberto Carlos paying tribute in 2014 to the two Brazilian clubs whom he started his career with.

Roberto Carlos joined Real Madrid in 1996. When newly appointed manager Fabio Capello learned that Roberto Carlos had become transferable he barely could believe it, and he asked chairman Lorenzo Sanz to travel to Milan immediately. An agreement had been reached 24 hours later. Roberto Carlos was given the number 3 shirt and held the position as the team's first choice left-back from the 1996–97 season until the 2006–07 season. During his 11 seasons with Madrid, he appeared in 584 matches in all competitions, scoring 71 goals. In January 2006, he became Real Madrid's most capped foreign-born player in La Liga with 370 appearances, breaking the previous record of 329 held by Alfredo Di Stéfano. During his Real Madrid career, Roberto Carlos was, alongside Milan and Italy legend Paolo Maldini, considered the greatest left-back in the world. As a high-profile player and one of the most influential members of the team, Roberto Carlos was considered one of Madrid's Galácticos (which included Zinedine Zidane, Luís Figo, Ronaldo and David Beckham) during Florentino Pérez's first tenure as club president.

Roberto Carlos can cover the entire [left] wing all on his own.

— Real Madrid coach Vicente del Bosque on Roberto Carlos having the ability to defend and attack the left side of the field by himself.

He won four La Liga titles with Madrid, and played in the 1998, 2000 and 2002 UEFA Champions League finals, assisting Zinedine Zidane's winning goal in 2002, considered one of the greatest goals in Champions League history. Roberto Carlos was named as Club Defender of the Year and included in the UEFA Team of the Year in 2002 and 2003. In the later part of his Real Madrid career, Roberto Carlos was named as one of the club's "three captains" alongside Raúl and Guti. Renowned for getting forward from his left-back position and scoring spectacular goals, in February 1998, he scored arguably his most memorable goal for Real Madrid with a bending volley struck with the outside of his left foot from near the sideline in a Copa del Rey match against Tenerife in what was described as an "impossible goal".

On the final day of the 2002–03 season, with Madrid needing to beat Athletic Bilbao to overtake Real Sociedad and win their 29th La Liga title, Roberto Carlos scored from a free-kick in the second minute of first half stoppage time to put los Blancos 2–1 ahead. The team eventually ran out 3–1 winners to wrap up the title. On 6 December 2003, Roberto Carlos scored the opening goal for Madrid as they beat Barcelona in El Clásico at Camp Nou for the first time in a La Liga match in 20 years.

In March 2007, in the second leg of the Champions League round of 16 against Bayern Munich, Roberto Carlos failed to control the backpass when Madrid kicked off, allowing Bayern's Hasan Salihamidžić to steal the ball and feed to Roy Makaay, who scored the quickest goal in Champions League history at 10.12 seconds. Roberto Carlos bore the brunt of criticism for that mistake which led to the team's elimination from the Champions League, and, on 9 March 2007, he announced he would leave Real Madrid upon the expiration of his contract at the end of the 2006–07 season. His final goal for Real Madrid was a stoppage time winner against Recreativo de Huelva with three games remaining in the 2006–07 La Liga season. The goal proved to be crucial to Real Madrid winning its 30th league title as they eventually finished level on points with Barcelona, becoming champions via the head-to-head rule. Madrid clinched La Liga in Roberto Carlos's final match, a 3–1 win over Mallorca at the Santiago Bernabéu Stadium.

=== Fenerbahçe ===
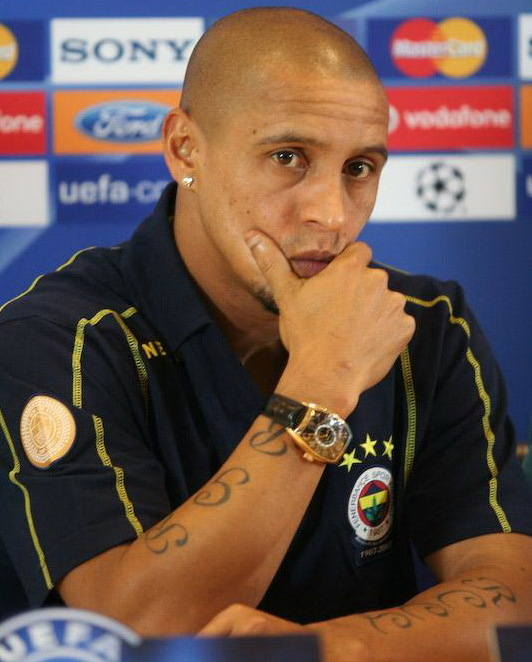
Roberto Carlos with Fenerbahçe in 2007

On 19 June 2007, Roberto Carlos signed a two-year contract (with one year optional) with the Turkish Süper Lig champions Fenerbahçe; he was presented at the club's home ground, the Şükrü Saracoğlu Stadium, in front of thousands of fans. In the first official match he played with the team, Fenerbahçe won the Turkish Super Cup against Beşiktaş by a score of 2–1. During a league match against Sivasspor, he scored his first goal for Fenerbahçe on 25 August 2007 from a diving header, which was only the third headed goal of his career. He was injured during the final period of the same season and missed the title race between Fenerbahçe and rivals Galatasaray. His team eventually lost the title to their rivals, while guaranteeing a place for themselves in Champions League knockouts for the next season. He announced that he was unhappy about the final result and would do his best to carry the domestic trophy back to the Şükrü Saracoğlu Stadium.

On 7 October 2009, Roberto Carlos announced that he would leave Fenerbahçe when his contract expired in December 2009. He offered to return to Real Madrid and play for free, though he also said return to the Brazilian domestic leagues was a possibility, and announced his departure on 25 November. He made his last appearance for Fenerbahçe on 17 December, as a late substitute against Sheriff Tiraspol in the UEFA Europa League.

=== Corinthians ===
After 15 years away from Brazil, Roberto Carlos returned to his country in 2010 to play for Corinthians, joining his friend and former Real Madrid teammate Ronaldo. On 4 June 2010, Roberto Carlos scored a goal against Internacional and helped Corinthians to move to the top of the Campeonato Brasileiro Série A table. The Timão won the game 2–0. On 16 January 2011, Roberto Carlos scored an impressive goal directly from a corner kick against Portuguesa. Concerned with his safety after being threatened by fans after the Copa Libertadores da América defeat to Colombian club Tolima, Roberto Carlos requested his release by the club, which was promptly facilitated by Corinthians.

=== Anzhi Makhachkala ===
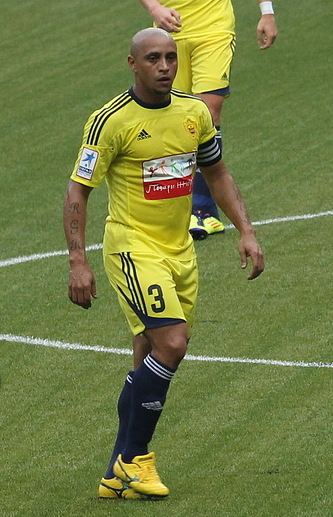
Roberto Carlos in August 2011

On 12 February 2011, after being heavily linked with a move to Notts County, Roberto Carlos signed a two-and-a-half-year contract with Russian Premier League club Anzhi Makhachkala, worth approximately €10 million. Playing in a defensive midfield position, Roberto Carlos was named captain of Anzhi on 8 March. On 25 April, he scored his first goal for Anzhi in a 2–2 draw with Dynamo Moscow, converting a 58th minute penalty. On 30 April, he scored his second goal, converting a penalty in a 1–0 win over Rostov, and on 10 June, he then scored his third goal on a 20th minute in a 2–0 win over Spartak Nalchik.

On 11 September 2011, Roberto Carlos scored his fourth goal in a 2–1 win over Volga Nizhny Novgorod. As of his first season for Anzhi, Roberto Carlos made 28 appearances and scored five goals. On 30 September, he became the caretaker coach of Anzhi following the sacking of Gadzhi Gadzhiyev, before Andrei Gordeyev assumed the role also in a caretaker capacity. Roberto Carlos announced his plans to retire at the end of 2012, but continued to work behind the scenes at Anzhi. In August 2012, Anzhi coach Guus Hiddink confirmed his retirement at a news conference in Moscow, also stating, "Roberto was a world class football player. Every master's career ends at some point."

==== Cases in Russia ====
In March 2011, during a game away at Zenit Saint Petersburg, a banana was held near Roberto Carlos by one of the fans as the footballer was taking part in a flag-raising ceremony. In June, in a match away at Krylia Sovetov Samara, Roberto Carlos received a pass from the goalkeeper and was about to pass it when a banana was thrown onto the pitch, landing nearby. Roberto Carlos picked it up and threw it by the sidelines, walking off the field before the final whistle and raising two fingers at the stands, indicating this was the second such incident since March.

=== Delhi Dynamos ===
He ended his professional playing career with a spell as player-manager of Delhi Dynamos of the Indian Super League.

== International career ==
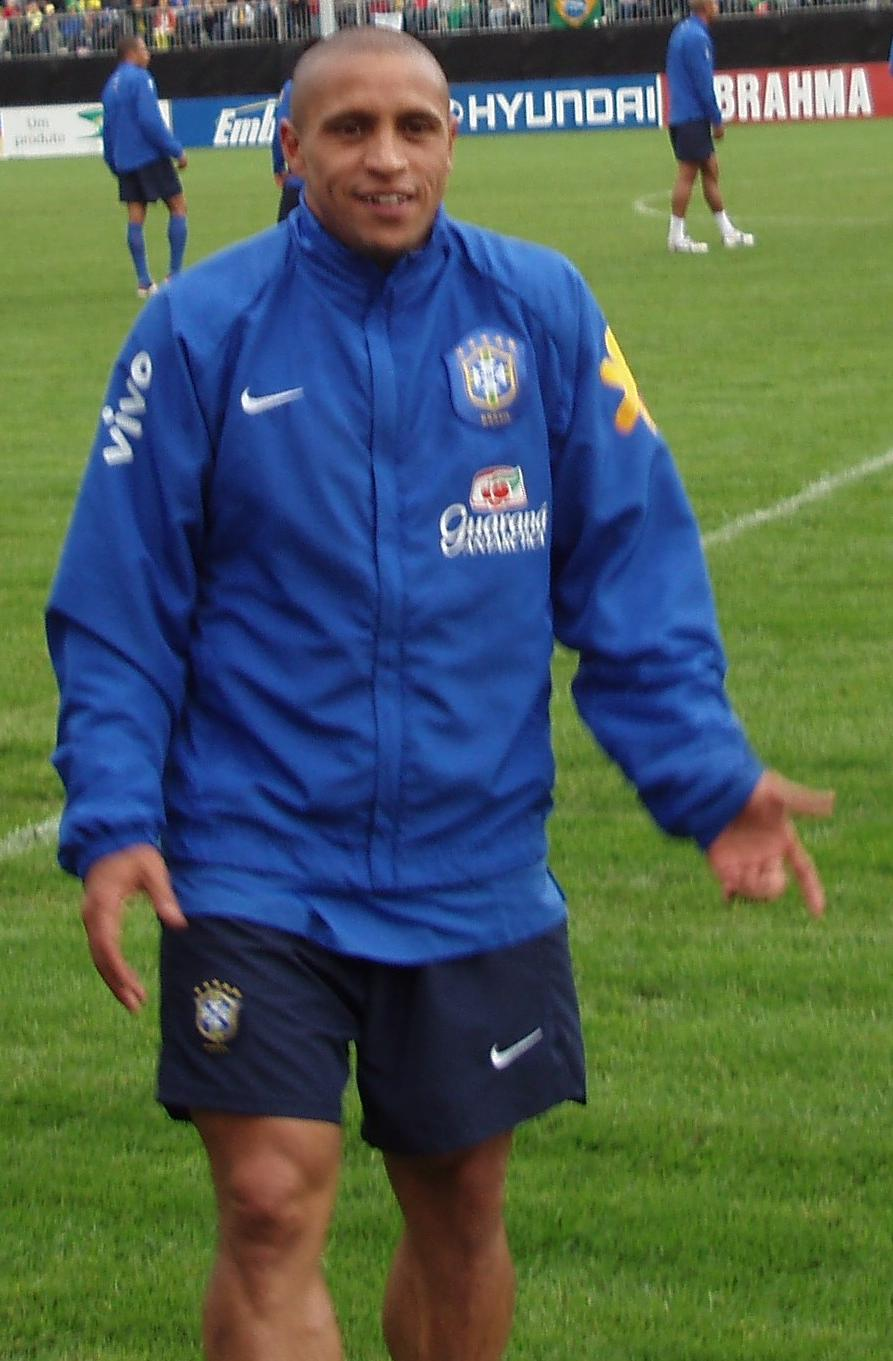
Roberto Carlos in 2006 with the Brazil national team

Roberto Carlos amassed 125 appearances, scoring 11 goals for the Brazilian national team. He represented Brazil at three FIFA World Cups, four Copa América tournaments, the 1997 FIFA Confederations Cup and the 1996 Olympic Games.

=== Early senior career ===
Roberto Carlos's 'banana shot' from 40 yards out against France in the 1997 Tournoi de France

On 26 March 1992, Roberto Carlos debuted for the Brazilian senior team in a 3–0 friendly victory against the United States. He is especially famous for a bending 40-yard free kick against France in the inaugural match of the 1997 Tournoi de France on 3 June 1997. The ball curled so much that the ball boy ten yards to the right ducked instinctively, thinking that the ball would hit him. Instead, much to the surprise of goalkeeper Fabien Barthez – who just stood in place – it curled back on target. This particular attempt has been considered to be the greatest free kick of all time. In 2010, a team of French scientists produced a paper explaining the trajectory of the ball.

At the 1998 World Cup, he played seven matches, including the final loss to France. After a qualifying game for the 2002 World Cup which was held in South Korea/Japan, Paraguay goalkeeper José Luis Chilavert spat on Roberto Carlos, an action which caused FIFA to give Chilavert a three-match suspension and forced him to watch the first game of the World Cup from the stands. Roberto Carlos played six matches in the World Cup, scoring a goal from a free-kick against China, and was a starter in the final against Germany, with Brazil winning 2–0. After the tournament, he was also included in the World Cup All-Star Team. Roberto Carlos later referred to the 2002 World Cup winning team as a "band of brothers together", and mentioned that the squad had a WhatsApp group and still talked regularly.

=== 2006 FIFA World Cup, retirement, and desire to return ===
Roberto Carlos' next international tournament was the 2006 World Cup. In July 2006, after Brazil's 1–0 defeat to France in the quarter-finals, he announced his retirement from the national team, saying: "I've stopped with the national team. It was my last game." He said he no longer wanted to play for Brazil because of the criticism he faced from fans and Brazilian media for his failure to mark goalscorer Thierry Henry on France's winning goal.

Upon signing with Corinthians in January 2010, Roberto Carlos told TV Globo that he hoped to play at the 2010 World Cup and believed his return to Brazilian football may help him return to the national team, as manager Dunga had yet to settle on a left-back. However, he was left off the 30-man provisional squad that was submitted to FIFA on 11 May 2010, along with Ronaldinho and Ronaldo. Despite his deep desire to do so, Roberto Carlos was ultimately not named in Dunga's final 23-man squad for the Brazil at the World Cup. Instead, newcomer Michel Bastos earned a spot for the left-back position.

== Style of play ==
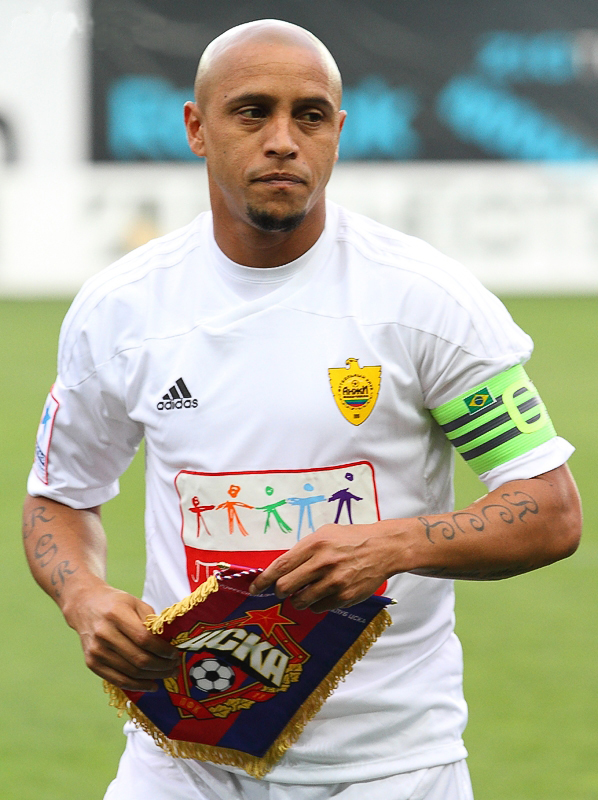
Roberto Carlos in 2011

Tactically, Roberto Carlos started out playing football in Brazil as a forward – usually as a centre-forward or outside forward – but spent most of his career as defender, usually as a left-sided full-back or wing-back. In 2006, he was described as the "most offensive-minded left-back in the history of the game", by John Carlin of The New York Times; indeed, he was known for his forward surging runs throughout his career. Roberto Carlos is also widely considered by several pundits as one of the best left backs in the history of the sport. During his time at Inter, he was also used out of position as a winger in a 4–4–2 formation on occasion by manager Roy Hodgson, which had a negative impact on his performances, and often saw him caught out defensively; in his later career with Anzhi Makhachkala, he was instead deployed as a defensive midfielder in a three-man midfield, in order to compensate for his loss of pace and physical decline due to his advancing age.

Roberto Carlos was nicknamed El Hombre Bala ("The Bullet Man") throughout his career, due to his powerful bending shots and free kicks, which have been measured at over 105 miles per hour (169 km/h), and for which he became renowned. A set-piece specialist, he is regarded as one of the foremost free kick takers of his generation, and was known for being capable of striking the ball powerfully – in particular from long range – and of producing curling shots with the outside of his left boot in dead ball situations. A talented and consistent player, with good dribbling skills at speed, as well as precise passing and crossing ability, he also possessed significant strength and excellent physical qualities, which along with his pace, work-rate, and energy, allowed him to cover the left flank effectively and assist at both ends of the pitch. While he earned a reputation as a hard-tackler, he was also known for being a clean player throughout his career. In addition to his stamina, running speed, technical skills, and crossing ability, he was also known for his long throw ins, as well as his strong 24-inch (61 cm) thighs, despite his small stature, which allowed him to accelerate quickly and strike the ball powerfully.

== Media ==
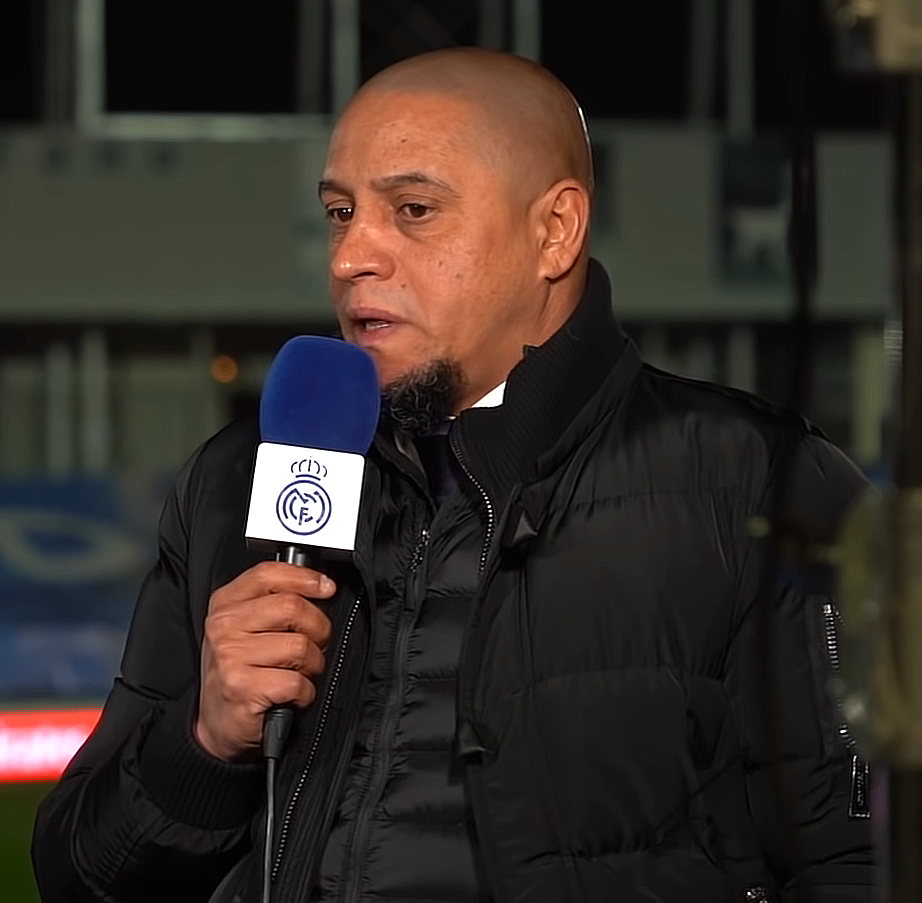
Roberto Carlos speaking with Real Madrid TV in 2021

Roberto Carlos has appeared in commercials for the sportswear company Nike. In 1998, he starred in a Nike commercial set in an airport in the buildup to the 1998 World Cup alongside a number of stars from the Brazil national team, including Ronaldo and Romário. In a Nike advertising campaign in the run-up to the 2002 World Cup in Korea and Japan, Roberto Carlos starred in a "Secret Tournament" commercial (branded "Scorpion KO") directed by Terry Gilliam, appearing alongside other star footballers, including Ronaldo, Thierry Henry, Francesco Totti, Ronaldinho, Luís Figo and the Japanese Hidetoshi Nakata, with former player Eric Cantona the tournament's "referee".

Roberto Carlos has also starred in Pepsi commercials, including a 2002 World Cup Pepsi advertisement where he lined up alongside David Beckham, Raúl and Gianluigi Buffon in taking on a team of Sumo players.

Roberto Carlos features in EA Sports' FIFA video game series, and was selected to appear on the cover of FIFA Football 2003 alongside Manchester United winger Ryan Giggs and Juventus midfielder Edgar Davids. He was named in the Ultimate Team Legends in FIFA 15. In 2015, the arcade game company Konami announced that Roberto Carlos would feature in their football video game Pro Evolution Soccer 2016 as one of the new myClub Legends.

In 2016, Roberto Carlos launched a software called Ginga Scout that connects players with coaches across the globe. In April 2018, Roberto Carlos was announced as ambassador of Morocco's candidature of the 2026 FIFA World Cup.

In June 2022, Roberto Carlos co-hosted (alongside Ronaldinho) an exhibition match in Miami including both current and retired players called "The Beautiful Game by R10 and RC3". Roberto Carlos' team won the match 12–10. A rematch was held in Orlando on 23 June 2023, which was suspended after about an hour of game time due to rain and pitch invasions. The score of the second match ended 4–3 for Ronaldinho's team.

== Charity ==
On 16 June 2019, Roberto Carlos took part in Soccer Aid at Stamford Bridge, London. He played for the World XI team which was captained by Usain Bolt and they beat the England XI on penalties.

In 2019, Roberto Carlos became the global ambassador of the international children's social programme Football for Friendship. He attended the programme's Forum and awarded the winners.

In January 2022, Bull In The Barne United, an English Sunday League pub team, won a raffle meaning that Roberto Carlos would play for them in a one-off friendly. The Shrewsbury-based side play in Division One of the Shrewsbury & District Sunday League and paid just £5 to enter the eBay raffle. On 4 March 2022, Roberto Carlos made a goalscoring debut for Bull In The Barne United during a 4–3 defeat to Harlescott Rangers in a friendly match at Hanwood.

On 23 February 2024, Roberto Carlos took part in the Match4Hope. He played for Team Chunkz, alongside Eden Hazard, David Villa, and various media personalities, against Team AboFlah. Roberto Carlos played for the starting 8 minutes only, before being substituted.

== Managerial career ==
=== Anzhi Makhachkala ===
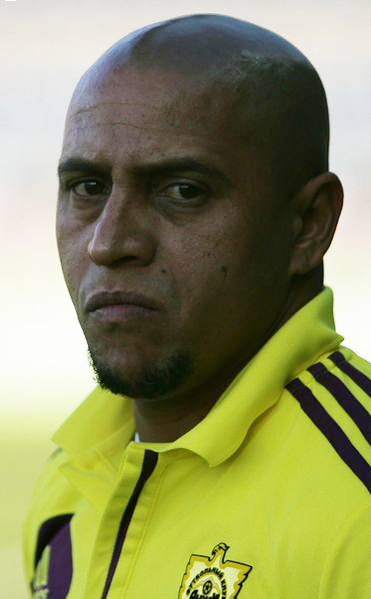
Roberto Carlos coaching Anzhi Makhachkala in 2012

Roberto Carlos had a brief spell as interim manager at Anzhi Makhachkala in early 2012. He later criticised the club upon resigning alongside manager Guus Hiddink.

=== Sivasspor ===
Roberto Carlos was appointed manager of Turkish Süper Lig team Sivasspor in June 2013. On 21 December 2014, he left the club following a defeat to İstanbul BB.

=== Akhisarspor ===
On 2 January 2015, Roberto Carlos was appointed as manager of Akhisarspor.

=== Delhi Dynamos ===
After finishing his season in Turkey, Roberto Carlos signed for Al-Arabi of the Qatari Stars League, but due to talks breaking down, he did not join the Qatari club. Then, on 5 July 2015, it was announced that he had signed to be the head coach of the Delhi Dynamos of the Indian Super League for the 2015 season.

At the end of the season, it was announced that he would not return to Delhi Dynamos in 2016.

== Doping accusations ==
In 2017, a report of investigative journalists of German broadcasting station ARD revealed doping practices in Brazil, including physician Júlio César Alves who claims to have treated Roberto Carlos for many years. He denied the allegations.

== Personal life ==
Roberto Carlos was born in Garça, São Paulo, on 10 April 1973 to Oscar and Vera Lucia da Silva.

On 24 June 2005, Roberto Carlos was robbed by two gunmen while doing a live radio interview. He was not hurt but they took his watch and the interviewer's cellular phone.

On 2 August 2005, he was naturalised as a Spanish citizen. This proved important for Real Madrid, as it meant that he now counted as a European Union player, opening up one of the club's allowed three slots for non-EU players and enabling Real Madrid to sign fellow Brazilian Robinho.

For his 38th birthday, it was reported that Anzhi Makhachkala owner Suleyman Kerimov bought him a Bugatti Veyron.

Roberto Carlos has 11 children with 7 women. In October 2017, he became a grandfather when his daughter Giovanna gave birth to a son.

On 25 July 2026, he married Souhaila Al-Tahiri, a Moroccan-Lebanese businesswoman and sports-management professional. Following the wedding, reports circulated that he had converted to Islam, but both Roberto Carlos and Al-Tahiri denied the claims, with Carlos stating that the reports were untrue.

== Career statistics ==
=== Club ===
Appearances and goals by club, season and competition
Club	Season	League			State league (Note: Includes Campeonato Paulista)		National cup (Note: Includes Copa do Brasil, Coppa Italia, Copa del Rey, Turkish Cup, Russian Cup)		Continental		Other		Total	
Club	Season	Division	Apps	Goals	Apps	Goals	Apps	Goals	Apps	Goals	Apps	Goals	Apps	Goals
União São João	1991	Série B	–		24	1	–		–		–		24	1
União São João	1992	Série B	21	3	21	1	–		–		–		42	4
União São João	Total		21	3	45	2	–		–		–		66	5
Palmeiras	1993	Série A	20	1	32	5	0	0	5	0	8 (Note: Appearances in Torneio Rio–São Paulo)	0	65	6
Palmeiras	1994	Série A	24	2	27	0	3	0	6 (Note: Appearances in Copa Libertadores)	1	–		60	3
Palmeiras	1995	Série A	0	0	23	3	4	1	10	3	–		37	7
Palmeiras	Total		44	3	82	8	12	1	16	4	8	0	162	16
Inter Milan	1995–96	Serie A	30	5	–		2	1	2 (Note: Appearances in UEFA Cup)	1	–		34	7
Real Madrid	1996–97	La Liga	37	5	–		5	0	–		–		42	5
Real Madrid	1997–98	La Liga	35	4	–		1	1	9 (Note: Appearances in UEFA Champions League)	2	2 (Note: Appearances in Supercopa de España)	0	47	7
Real Madrid	1998–99	La Liga	35	5	–		4	0	8	0	2 (Note: One appearance in UEFA Super Cup, one appearance in Intercontinental Cup)	0	49	5
Real Madrid	1999–2000	La Liga	35	4	–		3	0	17	4	3 (Note: Appearances in FIFA Club World Championship)	0	58	8
Real Madrid	2000–01	La Liga	36	5	–		0	0	14	4	2 (Note: One appearance in UEFA Super Cup, one appearance and one goal in Intercontinental Cup)	1	52	10
Real Madrid	2001–02	La Liga	31	3	–		6	1	13	2	2	0	52	5
Real Madrid	2002–03	La Liga	37	5	–		1	0	15	1	2 (Note: One appearance and one goal in UEFA Super Cup, one appearance in Intercontinental Cup)	1	55	7
Real Madrid	2003–04	La Liga	32	5	–		7	1	8	2	2	0	49	9
Real Madrid	2004–05	La Liga	34	3	–		2	0	10	1	–		46	4
Real Madrid	2005–06	La Liga	35	5	–		3	1	7	0	–		45	6
Real Madrid	2006–07	La Liga	23	3	–		1	0	8	0	–		32	3
Real Madrid	Total		370	47	–		33	4	109	16	15	2	527	69
Fenerbahçe	2007–08	Süper Lig	22	2	–		3	0	9	0	1 (Note: Appearance in Turkish Super Cup)	0	35	2
Fenerbahçe	2008–09	Süper Lig	32	4	–		8	2	10	1	–		50	7
Fenerbahçe	2009–10	Süper Lig	11	0	–		0	0	8 (Note: Appearances in UEFA Europa League)	1	–		19	1
Fenerbahçe	Total		65	6	–		11	2	27	2	1	0	104	10
Corinthians	2010	Série A	35	1	14	3	–		8	0	–		57	4
Corinthians	2011	Série A	0	0	3	1	–		1	0	–		4	1
Corinthians	Total		35	1	17	4	–		9	0	–		61	5
Anzhi	2011–12	Russian Premier League	25	4	–		3	1	–		–		28	5
Delhi Dynamos	2015	Indian Super League	3	0	–		–		–		–		3	0
Career total			593	69	144	14	61	9	163	23	24	2	985	117

=== International ===
Appearances and goals by national team and year
National team	Year	Apps	Goals
Brazil	1992	7	0
Brazil	1993	5	0
Brazil	1994	7	0
Brazil	1995	13	1
Brazil	1996	4	0
Brazil	1997	18	1
Brazil	1998	10	0
Brazil	1999	13	2
Brazil	2000	9	0
Brazil	2001	7	1
Brazil	2002	11	1
Brazil	2003	5	1
Brazil	2004	12	0
Brazil	2005	9	3
Brazil	2006	6	0
Total		125	10

Scores and results list Brazil's goal tally first, score column indicates score after each Carlos goal.

List of international goals scored by Roberto Carlos
No.	Date	Venue	Opponent	Score	Result	Competition
1	6 June 1995	Goodison Park, Liverpool, England	Japan	3–0	3–0	Umbro Cup
2	3 June 1997	Stade de Gerland, Lyon, France	France	1–0	1–1	1997 Tournoi de France
3	26 June 1999	Arena da Baixada, Curitiba, Brazil	Latvia	2–0	3–0	International friendly
4	9 October 1999	Amsterdam Arena, Amsterdam, Netherlands	Netherlands	1–0	2–2	International friendly
5	9 August 2001	Arena da Baixada, Curitiba, Brazil	Panama	5–0	5–0	International friendly
6	8 June 2002	Jeju World Cup Stadium, Seogwipo, South Korea	China	1–0	4–0	2002 FIFA World Cup
7	12 October 2003	Walkers Stadium, Leicester, England	Jamaica	1–0	1–0	International friendly
8	9 February 2005	Hong Kong Stadium, Hong Kong, Hong Kong	Hong Kong	2–0	7–1	2005 Carlsberg Cup
9	8 June 2005	El Monumental, Buenos Aires, Argentina	Argentina	1–3	1–3	2006 World Cup qualifying
10	12 October 2005	Mangueirão, Belém, Brazil	Venezuela	2–0	3–0	2006 World Cup qualifying

=== Managerial statistics ===
As of 20 December 2015

Managerial record by team and tenure
Team	From	To	Record							
Team	From	To	G	W	D	L	GF	GA	GD	Win %
Sivasspor	3 June 2013	21 December 2014	59	23	9	27	90	94	−4	38.98
Akhisar Belediyespor	11 January 2015	1 June 2015	20	5	7	8	25	28	−3	25.00
Delhi Dynamos	3 July 2015	20 December 2015	16	7	4	5	19	23	−4	43.75
Career totals			95	35	20	40	134	145	−11	36.84

== Honours ==
Palmeiras

- Campeonato Brasileiro Série A: 1993, 1994
- Campeonato Paulista: 1993, 1994
- Torneio Rio–São Paulo: 1993

Real Madrid

- La Liga: 1996–97, 2000–01, 2002–03, 2006–07
- Supercopa de España: 1997, 2001, 2003
- UEFA Champions League: 1997–98, 1999–2000, 2001–02
- UEFA Super Cup: 2002
- Intercontinental Cup: 1998, 2002

Fenerbahçe

- Turkish Super Cup: 2007

Brazil U23

- CONMEBOL Men Pre-Olympic Tournament: 1996
- Olympic Bronze Medal: 1996

Brazil

- FIFA World Cup: 2002; runner-up: 1998
- Copa América: 1997, 1999; runner-up: 1995
- FIFA Confederations Cup: 1997
- Umbro Cup: 1995
- Lunar New Year Cup: 2005

Individual

- Bola de Prata: 1993, 1994, 2010
- FIFA World Player of the Year: 1997 (silver)
- ESM Team of the Year (7): 1996–97, 1997–98, 1999–00, 2000–01, 2001–02, 2002–03, 2003–04
- Onze Mondial: 1997, 1998, 1999, 2000, 2001, 2002, 2003, 2005
- FIFA World Cup All-Star Team: 1998, 2002
- Trofeo EFE: 1997–98
- UEFA Club Defender of the Year: 2002, 2003
- UEFA Team of the Year: 2002, 2003
- Ballon d'Or: 2002 (runner-up)
- Golden Foot: 2008
- Sports Illustrated Team of the Decade: 2009
- ESPN World Team of the Decade: 2009
- Campeonato Brasileiro Série A Team of the Year: 2010
- FIFA 100
- Brazilian Football Museum Hall of Fame
- Ballon d'Or Dream Team (silver): 2020
- 11Leyendas Jornal AS: 2021
- IFFHS All-time Men's B Dream Team: 2021
- IFFHS South America Men's Team of All Time: 2021

== See also ==
- List of footballers with 100 or more UEFA Champions League appearances
- List of men's footballers with 100 or more international caps
- List of men's footballers with the most official appearances
- List of athletes who came out of retirement
