= Felice Centofanti =

Italian former footballer (born 1969)

Personal information
- Date of birth: 23 May 1969 (age 57)
- Place of birth: Teramo, Abruzzo, Italy
- Height: 1.87 m (6 ft 2 in)
- Position: Left-back

Youth career
- 1984: Teramo

Senior career*
Years	Team	Apps	(Gls)
1985–1986	Teramo	2	(0)
1986–1988	Verona	1	(0)
1988–1989	Jesina Calcio	31	(5)
1989–1991	Barletta	7	(0)
1990	Nola Calcio	27	(3)
1991–1992	Palermo	28	(8)
1992–1995	Ancona	73	(9)
1995–1996	Internazionale	9	(1)
1996–1997	Genoa	34	(5)
1997–1998	Ravenna	25	(3)
1997–1998	Genoa	4	(0)
1998–2000	Ravenna	43	(4)
2000–2003	Padova	66	(23)
2004	Bassano Virtus	1	(0)
Total		351	(61)
- * Club domestic league appearances and goals

Felice Centofanti (Italian pronunciation: [feˈliːtʃe ˌtʃɛntoˈfanti]; born 23 May 1969) is an Italian former footballer who played as a left-back.

== Career ==
=== Football ===
Centofanti was born in Teramo. In his long career, he played with many teams, including Internazionale (Inter) during the middle of his career. In Massimo Moratti's first season as owner of Inter, he signed many Italians such as Benito Carbone, Salvatore Fresi, and Maurizio Ganz, along with Centofanti himself.

Despite being a defender, Centofanti chose the number 9 jersey, when in 1995, the league introduced the selection of personal numbers. During Centofanti's tour of duty with Inter, he debuted in his first UEFA Cup game.

Centofanti also explored the midfield position as he saw his knack for goal scoring increase. When playing for Inter, he saw his role in the defence decrease as Alessandro Pistone began to overthrow him for the left-back position. Manager Roy Hodgson also preferred Brazilian Roberto Carlos over Centofanti.

In 2004 he concluded his career and became the director of Ancona Calcio.

In 2009 he returned to football, as director of San Marino Calcio.

=== Television ===
In 2005, Centofanti left the football world for the television, when he was invited to join the hit Italian show Striscia la notizia. He gained more fame for his antics on the television screen, rather than his work on the pitch. On Striscia la Notizia, he made skits and jokes with football players. Some of his targets included football stars Luca Toni, Francesco Totti, Clarence Seedorf, Alessandro Del Piero, and many more. Usually, in the skit, the player had a life or football related problem, and Centofanti magically appeared to help them out.

== Honours ==
=== Awards ===
- Serie C2 Champion: 2

Teramo: 1985-1986 (Serie C2/C)
Padova: 2000-2001 (Serie C2/A)

=== Notable Results ===
- 1 Coppa Italia final with Ancona: 1993-1994
