= 2018 OFC Women's Nations Cup squads =

The 2018 OFC Women's Nations Cup is an international football tournament being held in New Caledonia from November 18 to December 1, 2018. The eight national teams involved in the tournament were required to register a squad of up to 23 players, including two goalkeepers. Only players in these squads are eligible to take part in the tournament.

The position listed for each player is based on the official squad list published by the OFC. The age listed for each player is as of November 18, 2018, the first day of the tournament. The caps and goals listed for each player do not include matches played after the tournament began. The nationality for each club reflects the national association, not the league, to which the club is affiliated. A flag is included for coaches who are of a different nationality than that of their national team.

== Group A ==
=== New Caledonia ===
- Coach: Kamali Fitialeata

No.	Pos.	Player	Date of birth (age)	Caps	Goals	Club
1	GK	Lorenza Hnamano	29 September 2002 (aged 16)			(New Caledonian Football Federation) AS Wetr
2	DF	Josiane Ayawa	19 October 1997 (aged 21)			(New Caledonian Football Federation) Païta FC
3	DF	Moisette Broustet	3 November 1999 (aged 19)			(New Caledonian Football Federation) Païta FC
4	DF	Claire Kaemo	27 April 1993 (aged 25)			(New Caledonian Football Federation) AS Lossi
5	DF	Glenda Jaine	27 July 1989 (aged 29)			(New Caledonian Football Federation) AS Lossi
6	MF	Marilyse Lolo	8 June 1990 (aged 28)			(French Football Federation) AC Boulogne-Billancourt
7	MF	Cassidy Cawa	5 April 2000 (aged 18)			(New Caledonian Football Federation) AS Wetr
8	MF	Kamene Xowie	11 July 1991 (aged 27)			(New Caledonian Football Federation) ES 3
9	FW	Jackie Pahoa	5 November 2001 (aged 17)			(New Caledonian Football Federation) AS Académie Féminine
10	MF	Aurélie Lalie	27 February 1994 (aged 24)			(French Football Federation) US Boulogne
11	FW	Kim Maguire	27 November 1992 (aged 25)			(New Zealand Football) WaiBOP Football
12	DF	Bernadette Euribeari	12 November 1994 (aged 24)			(New Caledonian Football Federation) AS Communale Boulouparis
13	DF	Madeleine Jaine	27 July 1989 (aged 29)			(New Caledonian Football Federation) AS Lossi
14	MF	Kathleen Nemouare	31 March 1993 (aged 25)			(New Caledonian Football Federation) AJS De Koinde
15	DF	Darnelle Hace	16 October 2000 (aged 18)			(New Caledonian Football Federation) JS TRAPUT
16	MF	Ivonne Xowi	22 July 2000 (aged 18)			(New Caledonian Football Federation) FC Gaitcha
17	MF	Shaya Ihmeling	9 January 1999 (aged 19)			(New Caledonian Football Federation) AS Academie Feminine
18	FW	Sydney Gatha	2 January 1998 (aged 20)			(New Caledonian Football Federation) AS Communale Boulouparis
19	FW	Ami-Nata Ajapuhnya	11 March 1999 (aged 19)			(New Caledonian Football Federation) AS Wetr
20	GK	Dolores Bodeouarou	8 August 1990 (aged 28)			(New Caledonian Football Federation) Païta FC
21	MF	Céline Xolawawa	28 July 1990 (aged 28)			(French Football Federation) US Saint-Vit
22	DF	Cinthia Paita	20 June 1996 (aged 22)			(New Caledonian Football Federation) Païta FC
23	DF	Dominique Nexon				(New Caledonian Football Federation) Païta FC

=== Papua New Guinea ===
- Coach: Peter Gunemba

No.	Pos.	Player	Date of birth (age)	Caps	Goals	Club
1	GK	Betty Sam	12 October 1992 (aged 26)			(Papua New Guinea Football Association) Foreigners SC
2	DF	Rita Mayang	13 July 1995 (aged 23)			(Papua New Guinea Football Association) Bara FC
3	DF	Merolyn Sali	30 October 1998 (aged 20)			(Papua New Guinea Football Association) Tamba SC
4	DF	Judith Gunemba	11 May 1993 (aged 25)			(Papua New Guinea Football Association) Poro FC
5	DF	Olivia Upaupa	12 March 1997 (aged 21)			(Papua New Guinea Football Association) Tusbab Blue Kumuls
6	MF	Yvonne Gabong	29 August 1996 (aged 22)			(Papua New Guinea Football Association) Leilam FC
7	DF	Stephanie Gani	18 February 1993 (aged 25)			(Papua New Guinea Football Association) Poro FC
8	MF	Sandra Birum	6 June 1992 (aged 26)			(Papua New Guinea Football Association) Wantoks FC
9	MF	Margret Joseph	4 January 1999 (aged 19)			(Papua New Guinea Football Association) Leilam FC
10	MF	Rayleen Bauelua	11 January 1995 (aged 23)			(Papua New Guinea Football Association) Leilam FC
11	FW	Selina Unamba	24 November 1999 (aged 18)			(Papua New Guinea Football Association) Tusbab Blue Kumuls
12	FW	Meagen Gunemba	4 June 1995 (aged 23)			(Papua New Guinea Football Association) Poro FC
13	FW	Ramona Padio	13 March 1998 (aged 20)			(Papua New Guinea Football Association) 21 Lakers FC
14	FW	Cynthia Pulou	16 September 1998 (aged 20)			(Papua New Guinea Football Association) FC Genessi
15	FW	Georgina Bakani	6 December 1996 (aged 21)			(Papua New Guinea Football Association) KI Tulako SC
16	MF	Marie Kaipu	16 August 1997 (aged 21)			(Papua New Guinea Football Association) Hekari United
17	MF	Eunice Nabalu	30 December 1991 (aged 26)			(Papua New Guinea Football Association) Bara FC
18	MF	Theresah Boie	10 July 1995 (aged 23)			(Papua New Guinea Football Association) Crossroad FC
19	MF	Elizabeth Elizah	9 January 1996 (aged 22)			(Papua New Guinea Football Association) Leilam FC
20	GK	Faith Kasiray	20 December 1999 (aged 18)			(Papua New Guinea Football Association) Tusbab Blue Kumuls
21	DF	Fidorah Namuesh	4 December 2002 (aged 15)			(Papua New Guinea Football Association) Wawen FC

=== Samoa ===
- Coach: (England) Nicola Demaine

No.	Pos.	Player	Date of birth (age)	Caps	Goals	Club
1	GK	Ronisa Lipi	27 August 1995 (aged 23)			(New Zealand Football) Capital Football
2	DF	Moreva Mamea	30 January 1997 (aged 21)			Unattached
3	MF	Lynetta Laumea-Edward	7 January 1984 (aged 34)			(Football Federation Samoa) Lepea FC
4	FW	Sina Sataraka	8 December 2002 (aged 15)			(United States Soccer Federation) Bulls Hawaii
5	DF	Mariah Bullock	22 February 1991 (aged 27)			(United States Soccer Federation) Seattle Reign
6	FW	Melesete Aia	8 May 1999 (aged 19)			(Football Federation Samoa) Fa'atoia United FC
7	MF	Semeatu Lemana	23 February 1984 (aged 34)			(Football Federation Samoa) Moata'a FC
8	FW	Caroline Scanlan	16 July 1994 (aged 24)			(Football Federation Samoa) Kiwi FC
9	DF	Shontelle Stevens	9 September 1995 (aged 23)			(New Zealand Football) Manukau City AFC
10	FW	Madaleen Ah Ki	30 September 2002 (aged 16)			(Football Australia) Queensland Lions FC
11	DF	Mariecamilla Ah Ki	10 April 2000 (aged 18)			(Football Australia) Queensland Lions FC
12	MF	Lopamaua Ah Sam	10 June 1996 (aged 22)			(Football Federation Samoa) Lotopa SC
14	MF	Matalena Daniells	16 August 1996 (aged 22)			(Football Australia) Moreton Bay United
15	MF	Mole Saofaiga	18 August 2000 (aged 18)			(Football Federation Samoa) Kiwi FC
16	DF	Paepae Tuitama	10 July 1994 (aged 24)			(Football Federation Samoa) Faleasi'u SC
17	MF	Tiare Tuimavave	13 June 2001 (aged 17)			Unattached
18	FW	Hana Malo	1 May 1994 (aged 24)			(Football Federation Samoa) Fa'atoia United FC
20	GK	Meripa Seumanutafa	12 November 2001 (aged 17)			(New Zealand Football) Papakura City FC
23	GK	Jecky Toma	28 April 1999 (aged 19)			(Football Federation Samoa) Fa'atoia United FC

=== Tahiti ===
- Coach: Stéphanie Spielmann

No.	Pos.	Player	Date of birth (age)	Caps	Goals	Club
1	GK	Corail Harry	19 October 2001 (aged 17)			(Tahitian Football Federation) AS Tefana
2	DF	Mihitua Tihoni	4 November 2000 (aged 18)			(Tahitian Football Federation) AS Papara FC
3	DF	Hana Kimitete	11 June 2001 (aged 17)			(Tahitian Football Federation) AS Tefana
4	DF	Joelle Tepea	26 July 2002 (aged 16)			(Tahitian Football Federation) AS Tefana
6	MF	Maite Teikiavaitoua	25 November 1984 (aged 33)			(Tahitian Football Federation) AS JT
7	FW	Teatarii Maraetefau	24 March 1998 (aged 20)			(Tahitian Football Federation) AS JT
8	DF	Lanihei Rua	14 February 1999 (aged 19)			(Tahitian Football Federation) AS Pirae
9	FW	Heimiri Alvarez	3 September 1988 (aged 30)			(Tahitian Football Federation) AS Pirae
10	MF	Tiare Tekakioteragi	15 March 2003 (aged 15)			(Tahitian Football Federation) AS Tefana
11	MF	Tahia Tamarii	8 May 2001 (aged 17)			(Tahitian Football Federation) AS Papara FC
12	MF	Vahuariki Tufaunui	5 September 2002 (aged 16)			(Tahitian Football Federation) AS Tefana
13	FW	Hanihei Taumaa	7 March 1998 (aged 20)			(Tahitian Football Federation) AS Papara
14	DF	Hitiana Long Tang	15 December 2001 (aged 16)			(Tahitian Football Federation) AS Tefana
15	DF	Raihei Tetauru	24 June 2003 (aged 15)			(Tahitian Football Federation) AS Olympic De Mahina
16	GK	Vahinerii Puraga	14 June 2002 (aged 16)			(Tahitian Football Federation) Taiarapu FC
17	MF	Kiani Wong	21 November 2000 (aged 17)			(Tahitian Football Federation) AS Tefana
18	MF	Heidy Marae	9 October 2002 (aged 16)			(Tahitian Football Federation) Taiarapu FC
19	FW	Carole Teotahi	12 August 1992 (aged 26)			(Tahitian Football Federation) AS TAC
20	FW	Ninauea Hioe	20 December 1993 (aged 24)			(Tahitian Football Federation) AS Pirae

== Group B ==
=== Cook Islands ===
- Coach: Tuka Tisam

No.	Pos.	Player	Date of birth (age)	Caps	Goals	Club
1	GK	Marjorie Toru	29 June 1994 (aged 24)			(Cook Islands Football Association) Avatiu FC
2	FW	Paulina Morris-Ponga	19 February 1997 (aged 21)			(Cook Islands Football Association) Titikaveka FC
3	MF	Tehinnah Tatuava	15 April 2002 (aged 16)			(Cook Islands Football Association) Titikaveka FC
4	FW	Moeroa Harmon	8 July 2000 (aged 18)			(Cook Islands Football Association) Tupapa Maraerenga FC
5	FW	Rai Nganu	27 August 1995 (aged 23)			(Cook Islands Football Association) Puaikura FC
6	DF	Tasha Dean	23 February 1994 (aged 24)			(Cook Islands Football Association) Puaikura FC
7	DF	Poko Manuela	15 July 1989 (aged 29)			(Cook Islands Football Association) Nikao Sokattak FC
8	DF	Maeva Carr	18 September 1996 (aged 22)			(Cook Islands Football Association) Titikaveka FC
9	MF	Elizabeth Harmon	9 January 1992 (aged 26)			(Cook Islands Football Association) Tupapa Maraerenga FC
10	FW	Tupou Patia	17 April 1984 (aged 34)			(Cook Islands Football Association) Tupapa Maraerenga FC
11	DF	Teretia Teinaki	23 January 2002 (aged 16)			(Cook Islands Football Association) Tupapa Maraerenga FC
12	DF	Claudean Robati	6 December 1988 (aged 29)			(Cook Islands Football Association) Tupapa Maraerenga FC
13	MF	Piri Murare	16 August 2001 (aged 17)			(Cook Islands Football Association) Avatiu FC
14	DF	Lee Maoate-Cox	21 March 1995 (aged 23)			(New Zealand Football) Cashmere Technical
15	DF	Tekura Urarii	10 February 1986 (aged 32)			(New Zealand Football) Northwest United
16	FW	Marissa Iroa	17 November 1993 (aged 25)			(Cook Islands Football Association) Tupapa Maraerenga FC
17	MF	Mii Piri	2 August 1985 (aged 33)			(Cook Islands Football Association) Tupapa Maraerenga FC
18	MF	Tayla Hetherington	27 January 1994 (aged 24)			(New Zealand Football) Manukau United AFC
20	GK	Thea Keith	25 October 1994 (aged 24)			(New Zealand Football) Tokoroa AFC

=== Fiji ===
- Coach: Marika Rodu

No.	Pos.	Player	Date of birth (age)	Caps	Goals	Club
1	GK	Adi Tuwai	9 June 1998 (aged 20)			(Fiji Football Association) Ba FC
2	DF	Naomi Waqanidrola	9 July 1993 (aged 25)			(Fiji Football Association) Rewa FC
3	MF	Titilia Waqabaca	18 May 2001 (aged 17)			(Fiji Football Association) Ba FC
4	DF	Mereoni Tora	26 October 1998 (aged 20)			(Fiji Football Association) Ba FC
5	DF	Laniana Qereqeretabua	22 May 2002 (aged 16)			(Fiji Football Association) Ba FC
6	MF	Cema Nasau	15 November 1999 (aged 19)			(Fiji Football Association) Ba FC
7	MF	Koleta Likuculacula	17 August 2000 (aged 18)			(Fiji Football Association) Ba FC
8	FW	Asilika Gasau	15 February 2001 (aged 17)			(Fiji Football Association) Suva FC
9	FW	Trina Davis	6 September 2001 (aged 17)			(United States Soccer Federation) Washington Rush
10	FW	Luisa Tamanitoakula	28 July 1998 (aged 20)			(Fiji Football Association) Ba FC
11	MF	Jotivini Tabua	25 January 1996 (aged 22)			(Fiji Football Association) Labasa FC
12	FW	Lewamanu Moce	21 December 1988 (aged 29)			(Fiji Football Association) Suva FC
13	DF	Veniana Ranadi	16 July 1998 (aged 20)			(Fiji Football Association) Ba FC
14	MF	Sonali Rao	26 October 1997 (aged 21)			(Fiji Football Association) Ba FC
15	DF	Sekola Waqanidrola	18 March 1998 (aged 20)			(Fiji Football Association) Rewa FC
16	FW	Sofi Diyalowai	14 October 1993 (aged 25)			(Fiji Football Association) Labasa FC
17	MF	Viniana Riwai	6 June 1991 (aged 27)			(Fiji Football Association) Rewa FC
18	MF	Aliza Hussein	23 July 2000 (aged 18)			(Fiji Football Association) Ba FC
19	MF	Louisa Simmons	3 March 2000 (aged 18)			(Fiji Football Association) Ba FC
20	GK	Anaseini Maucuna	3 April 1996 (aged 22)			(Fiji Football Association) Labasa FC

=== New Zealand ===
- Coach: (Scotland) Tom Sermanni

No.	Pos.	Player	Date of birth (age)	Caps	Goals	Club
1	GK	Erin Nayler	17 April 1992 (aged 26)			(French Football Federation) FC Girondins de Bordeaux
2	DF	Ria Percival	7 December 1989 (aged 28)			(The Football Association) West Ham United
3	DF	Anna Green	20 August 1990 (aged 28)			(New Zealand Football) Capital Football
4	DF	Catherine Bott	22 April 1995 (aged 23)			(Swedish Football Association) Vittsjo GIK
5	DF	Meikayla Moore	4 June 1996 (aged 22)			(German Football Association) MSV Duisburg
6	DF	Rebekah Stott	17 June 1993 (aged 25)			(Football Australia) Melbourne City
7	DF	Ali Riley	30 October 1987 (aged 31)			(The Football Association) Chelsea FC Women
8	MF	Emma Rolston	10 November 1996 (aged 22)			(German Football Association) MSV Duisburg
9	FW	Katie Rood	2 September 1992 (aged 26)			(The Football Association) Bristol City FC
10	MF	Annalie Longo	1 July 1991 (aged 27)			(New Zealand Football) Canterbury United Pride
11	FW	Sarah Gregorius	6 August 1987 (aged 31)			(New Zealand Football) Capital Football
12	MF	Betsy Hassett	4 August 1990 (aged 28)			(Football Association of Iceland) KR Reykjavik
13	FW	Rosie White	6 June 1993 (aged 25)			(United States Soccer Federation) Chicago Red Stars
14	MF	Katie Bowen	15 April 1994 (aged 24)			(United States Soccer Federation) Utah Royals FC
15	DF	Sarah Morton	28 August 1998 (aged 20)			(New Zealand Football) Auckland Football Federation
16	DF	Elizabeth Anton	12 December 1998 (aged 19)			(New Zealand Football) Auckland Football Federation
17	DF	Stephanie Skilton	27 October 1994 (aged 24)			(New Zealand Football) Auckland Football Federation
18	FW	Grace Jale	10 April 1999 (aged 19)			(New Zealand Football) Auckland Football Federation
19	FW	Paige Satchell	13 April 1998 (aged 20)			(New Zealand Football) Auckland Football Federation
20	MF	Malia Steinmetz	18 January 1999 (aged 19)			(New Zealand Football) Northern Lights
21	GK	Victoria Esson	6 March 1991 (aged 27)			(New Zealand Football) Canterbury United Pride
23	GK	Nadia Olla	7 February 2000 (aged 18)			(New Zealand Football) Auckland Football Federation

=== Tonga ===
- Coach: Christian Koaneti

No.	Pos.	Player	Date of birth (age)	Caps	Goals	Club
1	GK	Mele Niukapu	8 May 1990 (aged 28)			(New Zealand Football) Birkenhead United
2	DF	Fifi Moala	2 February 1999 (aged 19)			(Tonga Football Association) Veitongo FC
3	DF	Tolini Kofutu'a	3 December 1995 (aged 22)			(Tonga Football Association) Fasi mo e Afi 'a Tungi FC
4	MF	Vea Funaki	26 May 1996 (aged 22)			(Tonga Football Association) Longolongo FC
5	DF	Mele Kafa	20 January 2002 (aged 16)			(Tonga Football Association) Talafo'ou FC
6	MF	Laveni Vaka	11 August 2001 (aged 17)			(United States Soccer Federation) Utah Avalanche
7	MF	Ilisapeti Malekamu	10 September 1995 (aged 23)			(Tonga Football Association) Navutoka FC
8	FW	Tautala Tupoumalohi	8 April 1987 (aged 31)			(Tonga Football Association) Veitongo FC
9	MF	Hena Fonohema	10 October 2000 (aged 18)			(Tonga Football Association) Fahefa FC
10	FW	Daviana Vaka	11 August 2001 (aged 17)			(United States Soccer Federation) Utah Avalanche
11	FW	Malia Tongia	9 April 1998 (aged 20)			(New Zealand Football) Central United
12	FW	Lositika Feke	10 April 2003 (aged 15)			(Tonga Football Association) Longolongo FC
13	MF	Finehika Finau	3 July 2002 (aged 16)			(Tonga Football Association) Lomaiviti FC
14	DF	Julie Macpherson	7 March 2000 (aged 18)			(Tonga Football Association) Lomaiviti FC
15	MF	Catherine Fonohema	10 July 2001 (aged 17)			(Tonga Football Association) Fahefa FC
16	MF	Anne Tuaefe	9 April 1991 (aged 27)			(Tonga Football Association) Marist FC
17	DF	Ana Lauteau	6 August 2002 (aged 16)			(Tonga Football Association) Veitongo FC
20	GK	Carollyne Fotu	13 May 2002 (aged 16)			(Tonga Football Association) Nukuhetulu FC
