= 2019 Cup of Nations squads =

The 2019 Cup of Nations is the inaugural edition of the Cup of Nations, an international women's football tournament, consisting of a series of friendly games, that was held in Australia from 28 February to 6 March 2019. The four national teams involved in the tournament registered a squad of 23 players.

The age listed for each player is on 28 February 2019, the first day of the tournament. The numbers of caps and goals listed for each player do not include any matches played after the start of tournament. A flag is included for coaches that are of a different nationality than their own national team.

== Squads ==
=== Argentina ===
Coach: Carlos Borrello

The final squad was announced on 23 February 2019.

No.	Pos.	Player	Date of birth (age)	Club
1	GK	Vanina Correa	14 August 1983 (aged 35)	(Argentine Football Association) Rosario Central
2	DF	Agustina Barroso	20 May 1993 (aged 25)	(Royal Spanish Football Federation) Madrid CFF
3	DF	Eliana Stábile	26 November 1993 (aged 25)	(Argentine Football Association) Boca Juniors
4	DF	Adriana Sachs	25 December 1993 (aged 25)	(Argentine Football Association) UAI Urquiza
5	MF	Vanesa Santana	3 September 1990 (aged 28)	(Royal Spanish Football Federation) Logroño
6	DF	Aldana Cometti	3 March 1996 (aged 22)	(Royal Spanish Football Federation) Sevilla
7	FW	Amancay Urbani	7 December 1991 (aged 27)	(Royal Spanish Football Federation) Alavés Gloriosas
8	DF	Ruth Bravo	6 March 1992 (aged 26)	(Royal Spanish Football Federation) Tacón
9	FW	Sole Jaimes	20 January 1989 (aged 30)	(French Football Federation) Lyon
10	MF	Estefanía Banini	21 June 1990 (aged 28)	(Royal Spanish Football Federation) Levante
11	DF	Florencia Bonsegundo	14 July 1993 (aged 25)	(Royal Spanish Football Federation) Sporting Huelva
12	GK	Laurina Oliveros	10 September 1993 (aged 25)	(Argentine Football Association) UAI Urquiza
13	FW	Paula Ugarte	10 January 1987 (aged 32)	(Argentine Football Association) UAI Urquiza
14	MF	Virginia Gómez		(Argentine Football Association) Rosario Central
15	FW	Belén Potassa	12 December 1988 (aged 30)	(Argentine Football Association) UAI Urquiza
16	MF	Lorena Benítez		(Argentine Football Association) Boca Juniors
17	DF	Luana Muñoz	22 January 1999 (aged 20)	(United States Soccer Federation) Tyler Apaches
18	FW	Yael Oviedo	22 May 1992 (aged 26)	(Royal Spanish Football Federation) Rayo Vallecano
19	MF	Mariana Larroquette	24 October 1992 (aged 26)	(Argentine Football Association) UAI Urquiza
20	MF	Miriam Mayorga	20 November 1989 (aged 29)	(Argentine Football Association) UAI Urquiza
21	FW	Yamila Rodríguez	24 January 1998 (aged 21)	(Argentine Football Association) Boca Juniors
22	DF	Milagros Otazú	31 May 2001 (aged 17)	(Argentine Football Association) UAI Urquiza
23	GK	Gaby Garton	27 May 1990 (aged 28)	(Argentine Football Association) Sol de Mayo (San Luis)

=== Australia ===
Coach: Ante Milicic

The final squad was announced on 21 February 2019. On 26 February 2019, Chloe Logarzo was replaced by Amy Harrison, after the former didn't recover from an ankle injury.

No.	Pos.	Player	Date of birth (age)	Caps	Goals	Club
1	GK	Lydia Williams	13 May 1988 (aged 30)	74	0	(Football Australia) Melbourne City
2	DF	Gema Simon	19 July 1990 (aged 28)	8	0	(Football Australia) Newcastle Jets
3	MF	Aivi Luik	18 March 1985 (aged 33)	19	0	(Royal Spanish Football Federation) Levante
4	DF	Clare Polkinghorne	1 February 1989 (aged 30)	112	9	(Football Australia) Brisbane Roar
5	DF	Laura Alleway	28 November 1989 (aged 29)	57	2	(Football Australia) Melbourne Victory
6	MF	Amy Harrison	22 December 1994 (aged 24)	7	0	(Football Australia) Sydney FC
7	DF	Steph Catley (vice-captain)	26 January 1994 (aged 25)	69	2	(Football Australia) Melbourne City
8	MF	Elise Kellond-Knight	10 August 1990 (aged 28)	102	1	(Football Australia) Melbourne City
9	FW	Caitlin Foord	11 November 1994 (aged 24)	67	14	(Football Australia) Sydney FC
10	MF	Emily van Egmond	12 July 1993 (aged 25)	82	18	(Football Australia) Newcastle Jets
11	FW	Lisa De Vanna	14 November 1984 (aged 34)	143	45	(Football Australia) Sydney FC
12	GK	Eliza Campbell	16 May 1995 (aged 23)	2	0	(Football Australia) Perth Glory
13	MF	Tameka Butt	16 June 1991 (aged 27)	74	10	(Football Australia) Melbourne City
14	DF	Alanna Kennedy	21 January 1995 (aged 24)	74	6	(Football Australia) Sydney FC
15	FW	Emily Gielnik	13 May 1992 (aged 26)	24	5	(Football Australia) Melbourne Victory
16	FW	Hayley Raso	5 September 1994 (aged 24)	30	2	(Football Australia) Brisbane Roar
17	MF	Alex Chidiac	15 January 1999 (aged 20)	14	1	(Royal Spanish Football Federation) Atlético Madrid
18	GK	Mackenzie Arnold	25 February 1994 (aged 25)	22	0	(Football Australia) Brisbane Roar
19	MF	Teresa Polias	16 May 1990 (aged 28)	10	0	(Football Australia) Sydney FC
20	FW	Sam Kerr (captain)	10 September 1993 (aged 25)	72	27	(Football Australia) Perth Glory
21	DF	Ellie Carpenter	28 April 2000 (aged 18)	28	1	(Football Australia) Canberra United
22	FW	Princess Ibini	31 January 2000 (aged 19)	5	0	(Football Australia) Sydney FC
23	DF	Teigen Allen	12 February 1994 (aged 25)	39	0	(Football Australia) Melbourne Victory

=== New Zealand ===
Coach: (Scotland) Tom Sermanni

The final squad was announced on 29 January 2019.

No.	Pos.	Player	Date of birth (age)	Caps	Goals	Club
1	GK	Erin Nayler	17 April 1992 (aged 26)	57	0	(French Football Federation) Bordeaux
2	DF	Ria Percival	7 December 1989 (aged 29)	135	14	(The Football Association) West Ham United
3	DF	Anna Green	20 August 1990 (aged 28)	71	7	Unattached
4	DF	CJ Bott	22 April 1995 (aged 23)	12	0	(Swedish Football Association) Vittsjö
5	DF	Meikayla Moore	4 June 1996 (aged 22)	31	3	(German Football Association) MSV Duisburg
6	DF	Rebekah Stott	17 June 1993 (aged 25)	67	4	(Football Australia) Melbourne City
7	DF	Ali Riley (captain)	30 October 1987 (aged 31)	119	1	(The Football Association) Chelsea
8	DF	Abby Erceg	20 November 1989 (aged 29)	132	6	(United States Soccer Federation) North Carolina Courage
9	FW	Katie Rood	2 September 1992 (aged 26)	8	4	(The Football Association) Lewes
10	MF	Annalie Longo	1 July 1991 (aged 27)	110	15	(New Zealand Football) Cashmere Technical
11	FW	Sarah Gregorius	6 August 1987 (aged 31)	88	33	(New Zealand Football) Upper Hutt City
12	MF	Betsy Hassett	4 August 1990 (aged 28)	107	13	(Football Association of Iceland) KR Reykjavík
13	FW	Rosie White	6 June 1993 (aged 25)	95	23	(United States Soccer Federation) Chicago Red Stars
14	MF	Katie Bowen	15 April 1994 (aged 24)	56	3	(United States Soccer Federation) Utah Royals
15	DF	Sarah Morton	28 August 1998 (aged 20)	5	1	(New Zealand Football) Western Springs
16	MF	Katie Duncan	11 February 1988 (aged 31)	119	1	(New Zealand Football) Onehunga Sports
17	DF	Stephanie Skilton	27 October 1994 (aged 24)	8	0	(New Zealand Football) Papakura City
18	FW	Aimee Phillips	6 May 1991 (aged 27)	6	1	Unattached
19	MF	Paige Satchell	13 April 1998 (aged 20)	7	1	(New Zealand Football) Three Kings United
20	MF	Daisy Cleverley	30 April 1997 (aged 21)	6	2	(United States Soccer Federation) California Golden Bears
21	GK	Anna Leat	26 June 2001 (aged 17)	3	0	(New Zealand Football) East Coast Bays
22	FW	Emma Kete	1 September 1987 (aged 31)	48	3	Unattached
23	GK	Victoria Esson	6 March 1991 (aged 27)	3	0	(Norwegian Football Federation) Avaldsnes

=== South Korea ===
Coach: Yoon Deok-yeo

The final squad was announced on 26 December 2018.

No.	Pos.	Player	Date of birth (age)	Caps	Goals	Club
1	GK	Kang Ga-ae	10 December 1990 (aged 28)	9	0	(Korea Football Association) Gumi Sportstoto
2	DF	Kim Hye-ri	25 June 1990 (aged 28)	78	1	(Korea Football Association) Incheon Hyundai Steel Red Angels
3	DF	Hong Hye-ji	25 August 1996 (aged 22)	16	1	(Korea Football Association) Changnyeong
4	DF	Jeong Yeong-a	20 October 1993 (aged 25)	7	0	(Korea Football Association) Gyeongju KHNP
5	DF	Park Se-ra	24 February 1990 (aged 29)	0	0	(Korea Football Association) Gyeongju KHNP
6	DF	Jang Sel-gi	31 May 1994 (aged 24)	47	11	(Korea Football Association) Incheon Hyundai Steel Red Angels
7	MF	Kang Yu-mi	5 October 1991 (aged 27)	24	8	(Korea Football Association) Hwacheon KSPO
8	FW	Ji So-yun	21 February 1991 (aged 28)	109	49	(The Football Association) Chelsea
9	MF	Han Chae-rin	2 September 1996 (aged 22)	15	3	(Korea Football Association) Incheon Hyundai Steel Red Angels
10	FW	Lee Geum-min	7 April 1994 (aged 24)	43	14	(Korea Football Association) Gyeongju KHNP
11	MF	Lee Min-a	8 November 1991 (aged 27)	51	14	(Japan Football Association) INAC Kobe Leonessa
12	FW	Jung Seol-bin	6 January 1990 (aged 29)	72	20	(Korea Football Association) Incheon Hyundai Steel Red Angels
13	MF	Jeon Ga-eul	14 September 1988 (aged 30)	96	38	(Korea Football Association) Hwacheon KSPO
14	MF	Cho So-hyun	24 June 1988 (aged 30)	115	20	(The Football Association) West Ham United
16	MF	Lee So-dam	12 October 1994 (aged 24)	45	4	(Korea Football Association) Incheon Hyundai Steel Red Angels
17	FW	Son Hwa-yeon	15 March 1997 (aged 21)	13	6	(Korea Football Association) Changnyeong
18	GK	Kim Jung-mi	16 October 1984 (aged 34)	110	0	(Korea Football Association) Incheon Hyundai Steel Red Angels
19	MF	Lee Young-ju	22 April 1992 (aged 26)	24	2	(Korea Football Association) Incheon Hyundai Steel Red Angels
20	FW	Yeo Min-ji	27 April 1993 (aged 25)	28	10	(Korea Football Association) Gumi Sportstoto
21	GK	Jung Bo-ram	22 July 1991 (aged 27)	3	0	(Korea Football Association) Hwacheon KSPO
22	DF	Lee Eun-mi	18 August 1988 (aged 30)	84	14	(Korea Football Association) Suwon UDC
23	MF	Jang Chang	21 June 1996 (aged 22)	10	0	(Korea Football Association) Seoul
24	DF	Shin Dam-yeong	20 October 1993 (aged 25)	31	1	(Korea Football Association) Suwon UDC
25	DF	Ha Eun-hye	27 November 1995 (aged 23)	3	0	(Korea Football Association) Gumi Sportstoto
26	DF	Lim Seon-joo	27 November 1990 (aged 28)	72	5	(Korea Football Association) Incheon Hyundai Steel Red Angels

== Player representation ==
=== By club ===
Clubs with 3 or more players represented are listed.

Players	Club
8	(South Korea) Incheon Hyundai Steel Red Angels
7	(Argentina) UAI Urquiza
6	(Australia) Sydney FC
5	(Australia) Melbourne City
3	(Argentina) Boca Juniors, (Australia) Brisbane Roar, (Australia) Melbourne Victory, (South Korea) Gumi Sportstoto, (South Korea) Gyeongju KHNP, (South Korea) Hwacheon KSPO, (South Korea) Suwon UDC

=== By club nationality ===
Players	Clubs
22	Australia, South Korea
13	Argentina
10	Spain
7	New Zealand
5	England, United States
2	France
1	Germany, Iceland, Japan, Norway, Sweden

=== By club federation ===
Players	Federation
45	AFC
21	UEFA
13	CONMEBOL
7	OFC
5	CONCACAF

=== By representatives of domestic league ===
National squad	Players
South Korea	22
Australia	21
Argentina	13
New Zealand	7
