= 2015 FIFA Women's World Cup Group A =

Football tournament group stage

Group A of the 2015 FIFA Women's World Cup consisted of hosts Canada, China, New Zealand and the Netherlands. Matches were played from 6 to 15 June 2015.

== Teams ==
Draw position	Team	Confederation	Method of qualification	Date of qualification	Finals appearance	Last appearance	Previous best performance	FIFA Rankings at start of event
A1 (seed)	Canada	CONCACAF	Hosts	3 March 2011	6th	2011	Fourth place (2003)	8
A2	China	AFC	AFC Women's Asian Cup 3rd place	17 May 2014	6th	2007	Runners-up (1999)	16
A3	New Zealand	OFC	OFC Women's Nations Cup winners	29 October 2014	4th	2011	Group stage (1991, 2007, 2011)	17
A4	Netherlands	UEFA	UEFA play-off winners	27 November 2014	1st	—	—	12

== Standings ==
Pos	Team	Pld	W	D	L	GF	GA	GD	Pts	Qualification
1	Canada (H)	3	1	2	0	2	1	+1	5	Advance to knockout stage
2	China	3	1	1	1	3	3	0	4	Advance to knockout stage
3	Netherlands	3	1	1	1	2	2	0	4	Advance to knockout stage
4	New Zealand	3	0	2	1	2	3	−1	2	

Source: FIFA
Rules for classification: Group stage tiebreakers
(H) Hosts

In the round of 16:

- Canada advanced to play Switzerland (third-placed team of Group C).
- China advanced to play Cameroon (runner-up of Group C).
- Netherlands (as one of the four best third-placed teams) advanced to play Japan (winner of Group C).

== Matches ==
=== Canada vs China ===
6 June 2015
16:00 MDT (UTC−6)

Canada	1–0	China
Sinclair 90+2' (pen.)	Report

Commonwealth Stadium, Edmonton
Attendance: 53,058
Referee: Kateryna Monzul (Ukraine)

Canada	China

GK	1	Erin McLeod
RB	9	Josée Bélanger
CB	3	Kadeisha Buchanan
CB	10	Lauren Sesselmann
LB	15	Allysha Chapman
CM	11	Desiree Scott	(yellow card) 22'	(substituted off) 71'
CM	22	Ashley Lawrence
RW	14	Melissa Tancredi		(substituted off) 77'
LW	16	Jonelle Filigno		(substituted off) 61'
CF	12	Christine Sinclair (c)
CF	13	Sophie Schmidt
Substitutions:
MF	6	Kaylyn Kyle		(substituted on) 61'
MF	17	Jessie Fleming		(substituted on) 71'
FW	19	Adriana Leon		(substituted on) 77'
Manager:
John Herdman

GK	12	Wang Fei
RB	5	Wu Haiyan (c)
CB	14	Zhao Rong
CB	6	Li Dongna
LB	2	Liu Shanshan
CM	19	Tan Ruyin
CM	23	Ren Guixin
RW	21	Wang Lisi	(substituted off) 42'
AM	10	Li Ying	(substituted off) 62'
LW	17	Gu Yasha	(substituted off) 87'
CF	9	Wang Shanshan
Substitutions:
MF	18	Han Peng	(substituted on) 42'
MF	20	Zhang Rui	(substituted on) 62'
MF	8	Ma Jun	(substituted on) 87'
Manager:
Hao Wei

Player of the Match:
Sophie Schmidt (Canada)

Assistant referees:
Nataliya Rachynska (Ukraine)
Sanja Rođak-Karšić (Croatia)
Fourth official:
Stéphanie Frappart (France)
Fifth official:
Manuela Nicolosi (France)

=== New Zealand vs Netherlands ===
6 June 2015
19:00 MDT (UTC−6)

New Zealand	0–1	Netherlands
	Report	Martens 33'

Commonwealth Stadium, Edmonton
Attendance: 53,058
Referee: Quetzalli Alvarado (Mexico)

New Zealand	Netherlands

GK	1	Erin Nayler
RB	2	Ria Percival
CB	6	Rebekah Stott
CB	5	Abby Erceg (c)
LB	7	Ali Riley
CM	4	Katie Hoyle
CM	14	Katie Bowen	(substituted off) 72'
RW	10	Sarah Gregorius	(substituted off) 67'
AM	16	Annalie Longo
LW	9	Amber Hearn
CF	17	Hannah Wilkinson
Substitutions:
FW	8	Jasmine Pereira	(substituted on) 67'
MF	12	Betsy Hassett	(substituted on) 72'
Manager:
Tony Readings

GK	1	Loes Geurts
RB	2	Desiree van Lunteren
CB	3	Stefanie van der Gragt
CB	4	Mandy van den Berg (c)
LB	5	Petra Hogewoning
RM	8	Sherida Spitse
CM	10	Daniëlle van de Donk	(yellow card) 32'
LM	6	Anouk Dekker		(substituted off) 84'
RF	7	Manon Melis
CF	9	Vivianne Miedema		(substituted off) 81'
LF	11	Lieke Martens	(yellow card) 64'	(substituted off) 90+2'
Substitutions:
FW	22	Shanice van de Sanden		(substituted on) 81'
MF	17	Tessel Middag		(substituted on) 84'
FW	19	Kirsten van de Ven		(substituted on) 90+2'
Manager:
Roger Reijners

Player of the Match:
Lieke Martens (Netherlands)

Assistant referees:
Mayte Chávez (Mexico)
Enedina Caudillo (Mexico)
Fourth official:
Melissa Borjas (Honduras)
Fifth official:
Manuela Nicolosi (France)

=== China vs Netherlands ===
11 June 2015
16:00 MDT (UTC−6)

China	1–0	Netherlands
Wang Lisi 90+1'	Report

Commonwealth Stadium, Edmonton
Attendance: 35,544
Referee: Yeimy Martínez (Colombia)

China	Netherlands

GK	12	Wang Fei
RB	5	Wu Haiyan (c)
CB	14	Zhao Rong
CB	6	Li Dongna
LB	2	Liu Shanshan
CM	19	Tan Ruyin
CM	23	Ren Guixin	(substituted off) 71'
RW	21	Wang Lisi
AM	13	Tang Jiali	(substituted off) 86'
LW	18	Han Peng
CF	9	Wang Shanshan	(substituted off) 57'
Substitutions:
FW	11	Wang Shuang	(substituted on) 57'
MF	8	Ma Jun	(substituted on) 71'
MF	16	Lou Jiahui	(substituted on) 86'
Manager:
Hao Wei

GK	1	Loes Geurts
RB	2	Desiree van Lunteren
CB	3	Stefanie van der Gragt
CB	4	Mandy van den Berg (c)
LB	5	Petra Hogewoning	(substituted off) 59'
CM	17	Tessel Middag	(substituted off) 70'
CM	10	Daniëlle van de Donk
CM	8	Sherida Spitse
RF	7	Manon Melis
CF	9	Vivianne Miedema
LF	11	Lieke Martens
Substitutions:
DF	15	Merel van Dongen	(substituted on) 59'
DF	6	Anouk Dekker	(substituted on) 70'
Manager:
Roger Reijners

Player of the Match:
Li Dongna (China)

Assistant referees:
Janette Arcanjo (Brazil)
Liliana Bejarano (Bolivia)
Fourth official:
Lucila Venegas (Mexico)
Fifth official:
Loreto Toloza (Chile)

=== Canada vs New Zealand ===
11 June 2015
19:00 MDT (UTC−6)

Canada	0–0	New Zealand
	Report

Commonwealth Stadium, Edmonton
Attendance: 35,544
Referee: Bibiana Steinhaus (Germany)

Canada	New Zealand

GK	1	Erin McLeod
RB	9	Josée Bélanger
CB	3	Kadeisha Buchanan
CB	10	Lauren Sesselmann		(substituted off) 68'
LB	15	Allysha Chapman	(yellow card) 31'
CM	11	Desiree Scott		(substituted off) 73'
CM	22	Ashley Lawrence
RW	14	Melissa Tancredi
LW	16	Jonelle Filigno		(substituted off) 63'
CF	12	Christine Sinclair (c)
CF	13	Sophie Schmidt
Substitutions:
MF	6	Kaylyn Kyle		(substituted on) 63'
MF	4	Carmelina Moscato		(substituted on) 68'
FW	19	Adriana Leon		(substituted on) 73'
Manager:
John Herdman

GK	1	Erin Nayler
RB	2	Ria Percival	(yellow card) 52'
CB	6	Rebekah Stott
CB	5	Abby Erceg (c)
LB	7	Ali Riley
DM	4	Katie Hoyle
CM	12	Betsy Hassett		(substituted off) 77'
CM	16	Annalie Longo
RF	10	Sarah Gregorius	(yellow card) 71'	(substituted off) 80'
CF	17	Hannah Wilkinson		(substituted off) 89'
LF	9	Amber Hearn
Substitutions:
MF	14	Katie Bowen		(substituted on) 77'
MF	13	Rosie White		(substituted on) 80'
FW	8	Jasmine Pereira		(substituted on) 89'
Manager:
Tony Readings

Player of the Match:
Erin Nayler (New Zealand)

Assistant referees:
Katrin Rafalski (Germany)
Marina Wozniak (Germany)
Fourth official:
Abirami Naidu (Singapore)
Fifth official:
Loreto Toloza (Chile)

=== Netherlands vs Canada ===
15 June 2015
19:30 EDT (UTC−4)

Netherlands	1–1	Canada
Van de Ven 87'	Report	Lawrence 10'

Olympic Stadium, Montreal
Attendance: 45,420
Referee: Ri Hyang-ok (North Korea)

Netherlands	Canada

GK	1	Loes Geurts
RB	2	Desiree van Lunteren		(substituted off) 13'
CB	3	Stefanie van der Gragt	(yellow card) 73'
CB	4	Mandy van den Berg (c)
LB	15	Merel van Dongen
CM	6	Anouk Dekker
CM	10	Daniëlle van de Donk		(substituted off) 72'
CM	8	Sherida Spitse
RF	7	Manon Melis
CF	9	Vivianne Miedema
LF	11	Lieke Martens
Substitutions:
DF	13	Dominique Bloodworth		(substituted on) 13'
FW	19	Kirsten van de Ven		(substituted on) 72'
Manager:
Roger Reijners

GK	1	Erin McLeod
RB	9	Josée Bélanger	(yellow card) 72'
CB	3	Kadeisha Buchanan
CB	4	Carmelina Moscato
LB	15	Allysha Chapman
CM	17	Jessie Fleming		(substituted off) 61'
CM	6	Kaylyn Kyle		(substituted off) 61'
CM	22	Ashley Lawrence
RF	13	Sophie Schmidt		(substituted off) 81'
CF	12	Christine Sinclair (c)
LF	19	Adriana Leon
Substitutions:
MF	11	Desiree Scott		(substituted on) 61'
FW	14	Melissa Tancredi		(substituted on) 61'
DF	7	Rhian Wilkinson		(substituted on) 81'
Manager:
John Herdman

Player of the Match:
Manon Melis (Netherlands)

Assistant referees:
Hong Kum-nyo (North Korea)
Kim Kyoung-min (South Korea)
Fourth official:
Teodora Albon (Romania)
Fifth official:
Petruța Iugulescu (Romania)

=== China vs New Zealand ===
15 June 2015
18:30 CDT (UTC−5)

China	2–2	New Zealand
Wang Lisi 41' (pen.); Wang Shanshan 60'	Report	Stott 28'; Wilkinson 64'

Investors Group Field, Winnipeg
Attendance: 26,191
Referee: Katalin Kulcsár (Hungary)

China	New Zealand

GK	12	Wang Fei
RB	5	Wu Haiyan (c)
CB	14	Zhao Rong
CB	6	Li Dongna
LB	2	Liu Shanshan	(yellow card) 75'
CM	19	Tan Ruyin
CM	23	Ren Guixin
RW	21	Wang Lisi		(substituted off) 90+3'
AM	13	Tang Jiali		(substituted off) 72'
LW	18	Han Peng		(substituted off) 84'
CF	9	Wang Shanshan
Substitutions:
FW	11	Wang Shuang	(yellow card) 86'	(substituted on) 72'
MF	16	Lou Jiahui		(substituted on) 84'
FW	10	Li Ying		(substituted on) 90+3'
Manager:
Hao Wei			(red card) 90+2'

GK	1	Erin Nayler
RB	2	Ria Percival
CB	6	Rebekah Stott
CB	5	Abby Erceg (c)	(yellow card) 83'
LB	7	Ali Riley
DM	4	Katie Hoyle	(yellow card) 86'
CM	12	Betsy Hassett		(substituted off) 46'
CM	16	Annalie Longo
RF	10	Sarah Gregorius		(substituted off) 46'
CF	17	Hannah Wilkinson
LF	9	Amber Hearn
Substitutions:
MF	13	Rosie White		(substituted on) 46'	(substituted off) 89'
MF	14	Katie Bowen		(substituted on) 46'
MF	11	Kirsty Yallop		(substituted on) 89'
Manager:
Tony Readings

Player of the Match:
Annalie Longo (New Zealand)

Assistant referees:
Katrin Rafalski (Germany)
Marina Wozniak (Germany)
Fourth official:
Abirami Naidu (Singapore)
Fifth official:
Anna Nyström (Sweden)

== See also ==
- Canada at the FIFA Women's World Cup – Performance of the Canada women's national soccer team at the FIFA Women's World Cup
- China at the FIFA Women's World Cup
- Netherlands at the FIFA Women's World Cup
- New Zealand at the FIFA Women's World Cup
