= 2010 OFC Women's Championship =

2010 OFC Women's Nations Cup
Tournament details
- Host country: New Zealand
- Dates: 29 September – 8 October 2010
- Teams: 8 (from 1 confederation)
- Venue: 1 (in 1 host city)

Final positions
- Champions: New Zealand (4th title)
- Runners-up: Papua New Guinea
- Third place: Cook Islands
- Fourth place: Solomon Islands

Tournament statistics
- Matches played: 16
- Goals scored: 78 (4.88 per match)
- Attendance: 4,940 (309 per match)
- Top scorer: (New Zealand) Amber Hearn (12 goals)

The 2010 OFC Women's Championship of women's association football (also known as the OFC Women's Nations Cup) took place in Auckland, New Zealand between 29 September and 8 October. It was the ninth edition of the tournament. For the first time, eight teams participated in the tournament, and a total of sixteen matches were played.

The tournament also served as the OFC Women's World Cup qualification tournament, with the winner, New Zealand for the record-breaking fourth time, qualifying for the 2011 Women's World Cup.

== Participating nations ==
Team	Tournament appearance	Last appearance	Previous best performance
Cook Islands	2nd	2003	5th (2003)
Fiji	3rd	1998	4th (1983, 1998)
New Zealand	9th	2007	Winners (1983, 1991, 2007)
Papua New Guinea	7th	2007	Runners-up (2007)
Solomon Islands	2nd	2007	4th (2007)
Tahiti	1st	—	—
Tonga	2nd	2007	3rd (2007)
Vanuatu	1st	—	—

== Officials ==
The following referees were named for the tournament:

- (Cook Islands) Tupou Patia
- (Fiji) Ravitesh Behari
- (New Zealand) Anna-Marie Keighley
- (Solomon Islands) John Saohu
- (French Polynesia) Averii Jacques

== Results ==
=== Group stage ===
==== Group A ====
Team	Pld	W	D	L	GF	GA	GD	Pts	Qualification
New Zealand	3	3	0	0	31	0	+31	9	Advance to knockout stage
Cook Islands	3	2	0	1	3	10	−7	6	Advance to knockout stage
Tahiti	3	1	0	2	5	9	−4	3	
Vanuatu	3	0	0	3	1	21	−20	0	

29 September 2010
13:00 UTC+13

New Zealand	14–0	Vanuatu
Hearn 10', 11', 18', 29', 90+1'; Moorwood 25', 81'; Wilkinson 42', 59', 73', 89'; Erceg 45+2'; White 54'; Milne 68'	Report

North Harbour Stadium, Auckland
Attendance: 300
Referee: John Saohu (Solomon Islands)
29 September 2010
15:30 UTC+13

Cook Islands	1–0	Tahiti
Mustonen 15'	Report

North Harbour Stadium, Auckland
Attendance: 100
Referee: Ravitesh Behari (Fiji)

1 October 2010
13:00 UTC+13

Tahiti	5–1	Vanuatu
Alvarez 14', 21', 83'; White 81'; Tokoragi 82'	Report	Tougen 19'

North Harbour Stadium, Auckland
Attendance: 100
Referee: Ravitesh Behari (Fiji)
1 October 2010
15:30 UTC+13

Cook Islands	0–10	New Zealand
	Report	Hearn 9', 40', 64'; Gregorius 16', 27', 56'; Hoyle 21'; Percival 45'; Erceg 57'; Jackman 80'

North Harbour Stadium, Auckland
Attendance: 450
Referee: Averii Jacques (Tahiti)

3 October 2010
15:30 UTC+13

Tahiti	0–7	New Zealand
	Report	Armstrong 36'; Hearn 59', 75'; Green 76'; Yallop 80'; Gregorius 90'; Percival 90+2'

North Harbour Stadium, Auckland
Attendance: 500
Referee: John Saohu (Solomon Islands)
3 October 2010
15:30 UTC+13

Vanuatu	0–2	Cook Islands
	Report	Napa 83'; Henry 89'

North Harbour Stadium, Auckland
Attendance: 200
Referee: Ravitesh Behari (Fiji)

==== Group B ====
Team	Pld	W	D	L	GF	GA	GD	Pts	Qualification
Papua New Guinea	3	3	0	0	8	1	+7	9	Advance to knockout stage
Solomon Islands	3	1	1	1	5	2	+3	4	Advance to knockout stage
Tonga	3	1	0	2	2	8	−6	3	
Fiji	3	0	1	2	1	5	−4	1	

30 September 2010
13:00 UTC+13

Papua New Guinea	3–0	Fiji
Peninsa 8'; Limbai 58'; Morris 62'	Report

North Harbour Stadium, Auckland
Attendance: 60
Referee: Anna-Marie Keighley (New Zealand)
30 September 2010
15:30 UTC+13

Solomon Islands	4–0	Tonga
Pegi 12', 90+1'; Misibini 37'; Maenu'u 74' (pen.)	Report

North Harbour Stadium, Auckland
Attendance: 80
Referee: Tupou Patia (Cook Islands)

2 October 2010
13:00 UTC+13

Tonga	2–1	Fiji
Siale 75'; Feke 90'	Report	Ratubalavu 13'

North Harbour Stadium, Auckland
Attendance: 200
Referee: Tupou Patia (Cook Islands)
2 October 2010
15:30 UTC+13

Solomon Islands	1–2	Papua New Guinea
Saepio 84'	Report	Limbai 29'; Siniu 48'

North Harbour Stadium, Auckland
Attendance: 250
Referee: Anna-Marie Keighley (New Zealand)

4 October 2010
15:30 UTC+13

Tonga	0–3	Papua New Guinea
	Report	Limbai 28', 61'; Likiliki 74' (o.g.)

North Harbour Stadium, Auckland
Attendance: 100
Referee: Averii Jacques (Tahiti)
4 October 2010
15:30 UTC+13

Fiji	0–0	Solomon Islands
	Report

North Harbour Stadium, Auckland
Attendance: 100
Referee: Anna-Marie Keighley (New Zealand)

=== Knockout stage ===
Semi-finals
6 October – Auckland
New Zealand	8
Solomon Islands	0
6 October – Auckland
Papua New Guinea	1
Cook Islands	0

Final
8 October – Auckland
New Zealand	11
Papua New Guinea	0
Third place
8 October – Auckland
Solomon Islands	0
Cook Islands	2

==== Semifinals ====
6 October 2010
13:00 UTC+13

New Zealand	8–0	Solomon Islands
White 7', 86'; Percival 17'; Moorwood 30'; Hearn 36'; Gregorius 52', 68'; Wilkinson 60'	Report

North Harbour Stadium, Auckland
Attendance: 600
Referee: Tupou Patia (Cook Islands)

6 October 2010
15:30 UTC+13

Papua New Guinea	1–0	Cook Islands
Limbai 62'	Report

North Harbour Stadium, Auckland
Attendance: 600
Referee: Anna-Marie Keighley (New Zealand)

==== Third-place match ====
8 October 2010
13:00 UTC+13

Solomon Islands	0–2	Cook Islands
	Report	Henry 70' (pen.); Mustonen 79'

North Harbour Stadium, Auckland
Attendance: 400
Referee: Anna-Marie Keighley (New Zealand)

==== Final ====
8 October 2010
16:00 UTC+13

New Zealand	11–0	Papua New Guinea
Riley 7'; White 15', 38', 50', 56'; Percival 18'; Wilkinson 32', 36'; Gregorius 73'; Hearn 79'; Green 84'	Report

North Harbour Stadium, Auckland
Attendance: 900
Referee: John Saohu (Solomon Islands)

New Zealand won the tournament and qualified for the 2011 Women's World Cup.

== Awards ==
2010 OFC Women's Championship winners

New Zealand
Fourth title

== Statistics ==
=== Goalscorers ===
There were 78 goals scored in 16 matches, for an average of 4.88 goals per match.

12 goals

- (New Zealand) Amber Hearn

7 goals

- (New Zealand) Sarah Gregorius
- (New Zealand) Hannah Wilkinson

6 goals

- (New Zealand) Rosie White

5 goals

- (Papua New Guinea) Zeen Limbai

4 goals

- (New Zealand) Ria Percival

3 goals

- (New Zealand) Hayley Moorwood
- (French Polynesia) Heimiri Alvarez

2 goals

- (Cook Islands) Teariivahine-Iteuaterai Henry
- (Cook Islands) Regina Mustonen
- (New Zealand) Abby Erceg
- (New Zealand) Anna Green
- (New Zealand) Ali Riley
- (Solomon Islands) Ileen Pegi

1 goal

- (Cook Islands) Dayna Napa
- (Fiji) Bela Ratubalavu
- (New Zealand) Bridgette Armstrong
- (New Zealand) Katie Hoyle
- (New Zealand) Maia Jackman
- (New Zealand) Liz Milne
- (New Zealand) Kirsty Yallop
- (Papua New Guinea) Rumona Morris
- (Papua New Guinea) Samantha Peninsa
- (Papua New Guinea) Deslyn Siniu
- (Solomon Islands) Betty Maenu'u
- (Solomon Islands) Ella Misibini
- (Solomon Islands) Mesalyn Saepio
- (French Polynesia) Tihani Tokoragi
- (French Polynesia) Tiare White
- (Tonga) Vasi Feke
- (Tonga) Fololeni Siale
- (Vanuatu) Stephanie Tougen

1 own goal

- (Tonga) Lupe Likiliki (playing against Papua New Guinea)

=== Final ranking ===
Pos.	Team	Pld	W	D	L	Pts	GF	GA	GD
1	**New Zealand**	5	5	0	0	15	50	0	+50
2	Papua New Guinea	5	4	0	1	12	9	12	−3
3	Cook Islands	5	3	0	2	9	5	11	−6
4	Solomon Islands	5	1	1	3	4	5	12	−7
**Eliminated in the Group stage**
5	Tahiti	3	1	0	2	3	5	9	−4
6	Tonga	3	1	0	2	3	2	8	−6
7	Fiji	3	0	1	2	1	1	5	−4
8	Vanuatu	3	0	0	3	0	1	21	−20
Total		16^{(1)}	15	1^{(2)}	15	47	78	78	0

Team(s) rendered in italics represent(s) the host nation(s). The competition's winning team is rendered in bold.
^{(1)} – Total games lost not counted in total games played (total games lost = total games won)
^{(2)} – Total number of games drawn (tied) for all teams = Total number of games drawn (tied) ÷ 2 (both teams involved)
