= 2012 OFC Women's Olympic Qualifying Tournament =

2012 OFC Women's Pre-Olympic Football Tournament
Tournament details
- Dates: 1 March–4 April 2012
- Teams: 5 (from 1 confederation)

Final positions
- Champions: New Zealand (2nd title)
- Runners-up: Papua New Guinea
- Third place: Tonga
- Fourth place: Vanuatu

Tournament statistics
- Matches played: 10
- Goals scored: 63 (6.3 per match)

2012 OFC Women's Pre-Olympic Football Tournament was the qualifying tournament to the football competition at the 2012 Summer Olympics in London for the member nations of the Oceania Football Confederation. It was the third edition of the OFC Women's Olympic Qualifying Tournament. Four nations participated in a preliminary tournament (hosted by Tonga) based on a league system with two advancing to a final. The winner of this preliminary stage played New Zealand in a home-and-away play-off for a place at the Olympics.

== Participating teams ==
- New Zealand
- Papua New Guinea
- Samoa
- Tonga
- Vanuatu

== First stage ==
The teams' paths to the Olympics were revealed on 17 February 2012.

=== Round-robin ===
Pos	Team	Pld	W	D	L	GF	GA	GD	Pts	Qualification
1	Papua New Guinea	3	3	0	0	20	3	+17	9	Qualification to final
2	Tonga (H)	3	2	0	1	11	5	+6	6	Qualification to final
3	Samoa	3	1	0	2	7	16	−9	3	Qualification to third place play-off
4	Vanuatu	3	0	0	3	6	20	−14	0	Qualification to third place play-off

Source: OFC
(H) Hosts
1 March 2012
13:00 UTC+13

Tonga	5–2	Vanuatu
Piuingi Feke 31', 47', 61'; Salome Va'enuku 42'; Kiana Mu'amoholeva 56'	Report	Serah Thompson 62'; Joella Avock 90+3'

Loto-Tonga Centre, Nukuʻalofa
Attendance: 700
Referee: Anna-Marie Keighley (New Zealand)
1 March 2012
15:30 UTC+13

Papua New Guinea	7–2	Samoa
Fatima Rama 7'; Linah Honeakii 12', 38'; Rumona Morris 45+1'; Daisy Winas 86'; Sandra Birum 87', 90+2'	Report	Lanuola Mulipola 19'; Tamasailau Leuta 70'

Loto-Tonga Centre, Nukuʻalofa
Attendance: 250
Referee: Tupou Patia (Cook Islands)

3 March 2012
13:00 UTC+13

Tonga	0–2	Papua New Guinea
	Report	Zeen Limbai 32'; Deslyne Siniu 48'

Loto-Tonga Centre, Nukuʻalofa
Attendance: 800
Referee: Averii Jacques (Tahiti)
3 March 2012
15:30 UTC+13

Samoa	4–3	Vanuatu
Hazel Peleti 24', 63', 84'; 80' (o.g.)	Report	Lisa Batick 5', 29'; Fina Angelo 43'

Loto-Tonga Centre, Nukuʻalofa
Attendance: 200
Referee: Finau Vulivuli (Fiji)

5 March 2012
13:00 UTC+13

Samoa	1–6	Tonga
Hazel Peleti 38'	Report	Laite Si'i Manu 4'; Piuingi Feke 30', 33', 34', 45'; Kiana Mu'amoholeva 45+6'

Loto-Tonga Centre, Nukuʻalofa
Attendance: 600
Referee: Nelson Sogo (Solomon Islands)
5 March 2012
15:30 UTC+13

Vanuatu	1–11	Papua New Guinea
Junane Ishmael 42'	Report	Georgina Kaikas 6', 57'; Deslyne Siniu 19', 22', 63' (pen.), 89'; Esther Muta 56'; Barbra Muta 73'; Fatima Rama 79'; Daisy Winas 85', 89'

Loto-Tonga Centre, Nukuʻalofa
Attendance: 100
Referee: Anna-Marie Keighley (New Zealand)

=== Knockout round ===
Final
7 March 2012 – Nukuʻalofa
Papua New Guinea	2
Tonga	0
Third place play-off
7 March 2012 – Nukuʻalofa
Samoa	0
Vanuatu	2

==== Third place play-off ====
7 March 2012
13:00 UTC+13

Samoa	0–2	Vanuatu
	Report	Elodie Samuel 20'; Leisale Solomon 24'

Loto-Tonga Centre, Nukuʻalofa
Attendance: 150
Referee: Tupou Patia (Cook Islands)

==== Final ====
7 March 2012
15:30 UTC+13

Papua New Guinea	2–0	Tonga
Fatima Rama 47'; Barbra Muta 49'	Report

Loto-Tonga Centre, Nukuʻalofa
Attendance: 800
Referee: Finau Vulivuli (Fiji)

=== Awards ===
A number of awards were announced following the preliminary tournament.

Player of the tournament	Best goalkeeper	Top scorer	Fairplay Award
(Papua New Guinea) Deslyne Siniu	(Tonga) Lupe Likiliki	(Tonga) Piuingi Feke (7 goals)	Vanuatu

== Final stage ==
=== Summary ===
Team 1	Agg.	Team 2	1st leg	2nd leg
New Zealand	15–0	Papua New Guinea	8–0	7–0

=== Matches ===
31 March 2012
17:00 UTC+13

New Zealand	8–0	Papua New Guinea
Hannah Wilkinson 6'; Rebecca Smith 13'; Sarah Gregorius 40'; Amber Hearn 43', 90+1'; Rosie White 63', 89'; Ria Percival 70'	Report

Toll Stadium, Whangārei
Attendance: 2,243
Referee: Rakesh Varman (Fiji)
4 April 2012
14:00 UTC+10

Papua New Guinea	0–7	New Zealand
	Report	Hayley Moorwood 13'; Sarah Gregorius 32', 84' (pen.); Hannah Wilkinson 37'; 42' (o.g.); Anna Green 49'; Betsy Hassett 70'

PMRL Stadium, Port Moresby
Attendance: 1,650
Referee: Norbert Hauata (Tahiti)

New Zealand won 15–0 on aggregate and qualified for the 2012 Summer Olympics.

== See also ==
- Football at the 2012 Summer Olympics
- 2012 OFC Men's Pre-Olympic Football Tournament
