= 2014 OFC Women's Nations Cup =

Tournament details
- Host country: Papua New Guinea
- Dates: 25–29 October
- Teams: 4 (from 1 confederation)
- Venue: 1 (in 1 host city)

Final positions
- Champions: New Zealand (5th title)
- Runners-up: Papua New Guinea
- Third place: Cook Islands
- Fourth place: Tonga

Tournament statistics
- Matches played: 6
- Goals scored: 40 (6.67 per match)
- Top scorer(s): (New Zealand) Amber Hearn (7 goals)
- Best player: (New Zealand) Rosie White
- Best goalkeeper: (Papua New Guinea) Fidelma Watpore
- Fair play award: Tonga

The 2014 OFC Women's Nations Cup (also known as the 2014 OFC Women's Championship) was the 10th edition of the OFC Women's Nations Cup, and took place in Papua New Guinea from 25 to 29 October 2014. The football tournament was organised by the Oceania Football Confederation. It was the tenth edition of the tournament.

New Zealand won the tournament without conceding a goal, thus winning their third straight edition, record-extending fifth overall, and qualifying for the 2015 Women's World Cup.

== Hosts ==
Papua New Guinea and New Zealand had submitted a bid for the tournament. Papua New Guinea was chosen at the OFC Executive Committee on 29 March 2014. Papua New Guinea had hosted the 2007 edition previously.

== Teams ==
All eleven OFC members were eligible to participate but only four entered teams.

Team	Tournament appearance	Last appearance	Previous best performance
Cook Islands	3rd	2010	3rd (2010)
New Zealand	10th	2010	Winners (1983, 1991, 2007, 2010)
Papua New Guinea	8th	2010	Runners-up (2007, 2010)
Tonga	3rd	2010	3rd (2007)

== Venue ==
Matches were originally to be played at the Sir Ignatius Kilage Stadium in Lae. However, the venue was later changed to the Kalabond Oval in Kokopo.

== Format ==
Teams played each other once in a round-robin tournament. The best placed team qualified to the 2015 FIFA World Cup.

== Matches ==
All times are local (UTC+10:00).

Pos	Team	Pld	W	D	L	GF	GA	GD	Pts	Qualification
1	New Zealand	3	3	0	0	30	0	+30	9	2015 FIFA Women's World Cup
2	Papua New Guinea (H)	3	2	0	1	7	4	+3	6	
3	Cook Islands	3	0	1	2	2	16	−14	1	
4	Tonga	3	0	1	2	1	20	−19	1	

Source: OFC
(H) Hosts
25 October 2014
11:00

New Zealand	16–0	Tonga
Cleverley 1', 18'; Gregorius 8' (pen.), 50', 70'; Hassett 17'; Collins 20', 69', 76'; White 26', 29'; Longo 67', 77'; Hearn 86', 90+7'; Percival 90+2'	Report

Kalabond Oval, Kokopo
Referee: Tupou Patia (Cook Islands)
25 October 2014
14:00

Papua New Guinea	4–1	Cook Islands
Birum 16'; M. Gunemba 26', 36', 84'	Report	Maoate-Cox 90'

Kalabond Oval, Kokopo
Referee: George Time (Solomon Islands)

27 October 2014
11:00

Tonga	1–1	Cook Islands
Loto'aniu 90+5'	Report	Toka 83'

Kalabond Oval, Kokopo
Referee: Anio Amos (Papua New Guinea)
27 October 2014
14:00

Papua New Guinea	0–3	New Zealand
	Report	Stott 59'; Hearn 70'; Longo 90+2'

Kalabond Oval, Kokopo
Referee: Finau Vulivuli (Fiji)

29 October 2014
11:00

Cook Islands	0–11	New Zealand
	Report	Collins 12', 20'; Erceg 14'; Hearn 19', 47', 56', 86'; Percival 43'; White 45+4'; Stott 54'; Hassett 75'

Kalabond Oval, Kokopo
Referee: Finau Vulivuli (Fiji)
29 October 2014
14:00

Tonga	0–3	Papua New Guinea
	Report	M. Gunemba 25'; Kaipu 32', 62'

Kalabond Oval, Kokopo
Referee: Topou Patia (Cook Islands)

== Awards ==
The following awards were given at the conclusion of the tournament.

Award	Player
Golden Ball	(New Zealand) Rosie White
Golden Boot	(New Zealand) Amber Hearn
Golden Gloves	(Papua New Guinea) Fidelma Watpore
Fair Play Award	Tonga

== Goalscorers ==
New Zealand's Amber Hearn won the top scorer award for the second tournament in a row.

7 goals

- (New Zealand) Amber Hearn

5 goals

- (New Zealand) Helen Collins

4 goals

- (Papua New Guinea) Meagen Gunemba

3 goals

- (New Zealand) Sarah Gregorius
- (New Zealand) Annalie Longo
- (New Zealand) Rosie White

2 goals

- (New Zealand) Daisy Cleverley
- (New Zealand) Betsy Hassett
- (New Zealand) Ria Percival
- (New Zealand) Rebekah Stott
- (Papua New Guinea) Marie Kaipu

1 goal

- (Cook Islands) Lee Maoate-Cox
- (Cook Islands) Tepaeru Toka
- (New Zealand) Abby Erceg
- (Papua New Guinea) Sandra Birum
- (Tonga) Heilala Loto'aniu
