= 2018 OFC Women's Nations Cup =

Coupe d'Océanie féminine de football 2018

Tournament details
- Host country: New Caledonia
- Dates: 18 November – 1 December
- Teams: 8 (from 1 confederation)
- Venues: 4 (in 4 host cities)

Final positions
- Champions: New Zealand (6th title)
- Runners-up: Fiji
- Third place: Papua New Guinea
- Fourth place: New Caledonia

Tournament statistics
- Matches played: 16
- Goals scored: 108 (6.75 per match)
- Attendance: 5,247 (328 per match)
- Top scorer(s): (New Zealand) Sarah Gregorius (Papua New Guinea) Meagen Gunemba (8 goals each)
- Best player: (New Zealand) Betsy Hassett
- Best goalkeeper: (Fiji) Adi Tuwai
- Fair play award: New Zealand

The 2018 OFC Women's Nations Cup was the 11th edition of the OFC Women's Nations Cup (also known as the OFC Women's Championship), the quadrennial international football championship organised by the Oceania Football Confederation (OFC) for the women's national teams of the Oceanian region. The tournament was held in New Caledonia between 18 November – 1 December 2018.

The tournament served as the Oceanian qualifiers to the 2019 FIFA Women's World Cup, with the champions qualifying for the World Cup in France. The champions also qualified for the 2020 Summer Olympics women's football tournament in Japan.

New Zealand were the defending champions. They won the tournament for their fourth consecutive and record-extending sixth overall OFC Women's Nations Cup title.

== Format ==
The format was as follows:

- Qualifying stage: The four lowest-ranked teams based on previous regional performances of all women's national teams (American Samoa, Solomon Islands, Vanuatu and Fiji) entered the qualifying stage, which was held from 24 to 30 August 2018 in Fiji (originally scheduled to be held in American Samoa). The winner qualified for the final tournament, joining the other seven teams which automatically qualified.
- Final tournament: A total of eight teams played in the final tournament, which was held between 18 November to 1 December 2018 in New Caledonia. For the group stage, they are divided into two groups of four teams. The top two teams of each group advance to the knockout stage (semi-finals and final) to decide the winner of the OFC Women's Nations Cup that qualify for the FIFA Women's World Cup as well as the Olympic football tournament.

The draw for the tournament was held on 21 March 2018 at the OFC Headquarters in Auckland, New Zealand. In both the qualifying stage and final tournament, the hosts (Fiji and New Caledonia) were assigned to position A1 in the draw, while the remaining teams were drawn into the other positions without any seeding.

=== Tiebreakers ===
The ranking of teams is determined as follows:

1. Points obtained in all qualifying matches;
2. Goal difference in all qualifying matches;
3. Number of goals scored in all qualifying matches;
4. Points obtained in the matches played between the teams in question;
5. Goal difference in the matches played between the teams in question;
6. Number of goals scored in the matches played between the teams in question;
7. Fair play points in all qualifying matches (only one deduction can be applied to a player in a single match):
  - Yellow card: –1 points;
  - Indirect red card (second yellow card): –3 points;
  - Direct red card: –4 points;
  - Yellow card and direct red card: –5 points;
8. Coin toss or drawing of lots.

== Qualification ==
For the first time, the OFC Women's Nations Cup is a compulsory tournament, so all 11 OFC member national teams have entered the tournament.

Team	Method of qualification	Appearance	Previous best performance	FIFA ranking at start of event
Cook Islands	Automatic	4th	Third place (2010, 2014)	Not ranked
New Caledonia	Automatic	2nd	Third place (1983)	Not ranked
New Zealand	Automatic	11th	Champions (1983, 1991, 2007, 2010, 2014)	20
Papua New Guinea	Automatic	9th	Runners-up (2007, 2010, 2014)	Not ranked
Samoa	Automatic	3rd	Fourth place (2003)	Not ranked
Tahiti	Automatic	2nd	Group stage (2010)	Not ranked
Tonga	Automatic	4th	Third place (2007)	Not ranked
Fiji	Qualification winners	4th	Fourth place (1983, 1998)	81

Note: New Caledonia and Tahiti are not members of the International Olympic Committee and thus not eligible to qualify for the Olympic Football Tournament.

== Venues ==
The host nation of the final tournament was New Caledonia. The matches were played at four venues.

Koné	Nouméa	2018 OFC Women's Nations Cup is located in New Caledonia	Lifou	Maré
Stade Yoshida	Stade Numa-Daly Magenta	2018 OFC Women's Nations Cup is located in New Caledonia	Stade de Hnassé	Stade de la Roche
Capacity: 3,000	Capacity: 16,000	2018 OFC Women's Nations Cup is located in New Caledonia	Capacity: 1,680	Capacity: 1,500

== Squads ==
Each team can name a maximum of 23 players.

== Group stage ==
The top two teams of each group advance to the semi-finals.

All times are local, NCT (UTC+11).

=== Group A ===
Pos	Team	Pld	W	D	L	GF	GA	GD	Pts	Qualification
1	Papua New Guinea	3	3	0	0	14	3	+11	9	Knockout stage
2	New Caledonia (H)	3	2	0	1	8	8	0	6	Knockout stage
3	Tahiti	3	0	1	2	8	12	−4	1	
4	Samoa	3	0	1	2	5	12	−7	1	

Source: OFC
Rules for classification: Tiebreakers
(H) Hosts
18 November 2018
14:00

Samoa	0–5	Papua New Guinea
	Report	M. Gunemba 17', 22', 53'; Gabong 27'; Bauelua 90+2'

Stade Yoshida, Koné
Attendance: 150
Referee: Nadia Browning (New Zealand)
18 November 2018
17:00

Tahiti	2–4	New Caledonia
Tamarii 27'; Hioe 45'	Report	Xowie 19'; Pahoa 22', 25'; Lalie 81'

Stade Yoshida, Koné
Attendance: 423
Referee: Morgan Archer (New Zealand)

21 November 2018
14:00

Tahiti	5–5	Samoa
Teotahi 3', 7', 50'; Taumaa 10'; Hioe 45+4'	Report	Sataraka 1', 79', 89'; Kimitete 4' (o.g.); Malo 21'

Stade Yoshida, Koné
Attendance: 200
Referee: Tapaita Lelenga (Tonga)
21 November 2018
17:00

New Caledonia	2–6	Papua New Guinea
Maguire 48'; Gatha 90+3'	Report	Kaipu 20', 31', 46', 60', 81'; Padio 36'

Stade Yoshida, Koné
Attendance: 603
Referee: Morgan Archer (New Zealand)

24 November 2018
14:00

Papua New Guinea	3–1	Tahiti
Unamba 31'; Padio 74', 84' (pen.)	Report	Taumaa 6'

Stade Yoshida, Koné
Attendance: 150
Referee: Torika Delai (Fiji)
24 November 2018
17:00

New Caledonia	2–0	Samoa
Ajapuhnya 50'; Xowie 67'	Report

Stade Yoshida, Koné
Attendance: 421
Referee: Ben Aukwai (Solomon Islands)

=== Group B ===
Pos	Team	Pld	W	D	L	GF	GA	GD	Pts	Qualification
1	New Zealand	3	3	0	0	27	0	+27	9	Knockout stage
2	Fiji	3	2	0	1	15	10	+5	6	Knockout stage
3	Tonga	3	1	0	2	1	23	−22	3	
4	Cook Islands	3	0	0	3	0	10	−10	0	

Source: OFC
Rules for classification: Tiebreakers
19 November 2018
14:00

New Zealand	11–0	Tonga
White 8', 15'; Longo 9', 13'; Hassett 34', 35'; Gregorius 37', 39', 52'; Percival 67'; Jale 88'	Report

Stade Numa-Daly Magenta, Nouméa
Attendance: 150
Referee: Rani Perry (Tahiti)
19 November 2018
17:00

Cook Islands	0–3	Fiji
	Report	Nasau 34'; Davis 36'; Tamanitoakula 57'

Stade Numa-Daly Magenta, Nouméa
Attendance: 150
Referee: Roger Adams (Papua New Guinea)

22 November 2018
14:00

Tonga	0–12	Fiji
	Report	Tamanitoakula 6', 11', 24', 36'; Nasau 13', 43', 51'; Davis 20', 81'; Diyalowai 22', 30', 90'

Stade Numa-Daly Magenta, Nouméa
Attendance: 100
Referee: Fina Angelo (Vanuatu)
22 November 2018
17:00

New Zealand	6–0	Cook Islands
Longo 13'; Rolston 15', 45'; Rood 68'; Morton 90+1'; Jale 90+2'	Report

Stade Numa-Daly Magenta, Nouméa
Attendance: 100
Referee: David Yareboinen (Papua New Guinea)

25 November 2018
14:00

Tonga	1–0	Cook Islands
Vaka 3'	Report

Stade Numa-Daly Magenta, Nouméa
Attendance: 100
Referee: Fina Angelo (Vanuatu)
25 November 2018
17:00

Fiji	0–10	New Zealand
	Report	Longo 8', 38'; Gregorius 16', 24', 88'; Moore 54'; Rood 58', 79'; Tora 70' (o.g.); Rolston 85'

Stade Numa-Daly Magenta, Nouméa
Attendance: 100
Referee: Rani Perry (Tahiti)

== Knockout stage ==
=== Bracket ===
Semi-finals
28 November – Maré
Papua New Guinea	1
Fiji	5
28 November – Lifou
New Zealand	8
New Caledonia	0

Final
1 December – Nouméa
Fiji	0
New Zealand	8
Third place match
1 December – Nouméa
Papua New Guinea	7
New Caledonia	1

=== Semi-finals ===
28 November 2018
15:00

Papua New Guinea	1–5	Fiji
M. Gunemba 12'	Report	Davis 24', 65'; Tamanitoakula 27'; Nasau 72'; Diyalowai 87'

Stade de la Roche, Maré
Attendance: 550
Referee: Nadia Browning (New Zealand)

28 November 2018
15:00

New Zealand	8–0	New Caledonia
Hassett 1'; Rolston 7', 20', 43'; Bowen 26'; Satchell 31'; White 38', 68'	Report

Stade de Hnassé, Lifou
Attendance: 1,200
Referee: Rani Perry (Tahiti)

=== Third place match ===
1 December 2018
14:00

Papua New Guinea	7–1	New Caledonia
M. Gunemba 5', 36', 54', 82'; Gabong 41'; Unamba 52'; Birum 84'	Report	Pahoa 60'

Stade Numa-Daly Magenta, Nouméa
Attendance: 400
Referee: Fina Angelo (Vanuatu)

=== Final ===
Winners qualified for the 2019 FIFA Women's World Cup and 2020 Summer Olympics.

1 December 2018
17:00

Fiji	0–8	New Zealand
	Report	White 2', 90+1'; Gregorius 6' (pen.), 75'; Hassett 38', 55'; Moore 45+2'; Rood 48'

Stade Numa-Daly Magenta, Nouméa
Attendance: 450
Referee: Tapaita Lelenga (Tonga)

== Goalscorers ==
There were 108 goals scored in 16 matches, for an average of 6.75 goals per match.

8 goals

- (New Zealand) Sarah Gregorius
- (Papua New Guinea) Meagen Gunemba

6 goals

- (Fiji) Luisa Tamanitoakula
- (New Zealand) Emma Rolston
- (New Zealand) Rosie White

5 goals

- (Fiji) Trina Davis
- (Fiji) Cema Nasau
- (New Zealand) Betsy Hassett
- (New Zealand) Annalie Longo
- (Papua New Guinea) Marie Kaipu

4 goals

- (Fiji) Sofi Diyalowai
- (New Zealand) Katie Rood

3 goals

- (New Caledonia) Jackie Pahoa
- (Papua New Guinea) Ramona Padio
- (Samoa) Sina Sataraka
- (French Polynesia) Carole Teotahi

2 goals

- (New Caledonia) Kamene Xowie
- (New Zealand) Grace Jale
- (New Zealand) Meikayla Moore
- (Papua New Guinea) Yvonne Gabong
- (Papua New Guinea) Selina Unamba
- (French Polynesia) Ninauea Hioe
- (French Polynesia) Hanihei Taumaa

1 goal

- (New Caledonia) Ami-Nata Ajapuhnya
- (New Caledonia) Sydney Gatha
- (New Caledonia) Aurélie Lalie
- (New Caledonia) Kim Maguire
- (New Zealand) Katie Bowen
- (New Zealand) Sarah Morton
- (New Zealand) Ria Percival
- (New Zealand) Paige Satchell
- (Papua New Guinea) Rayleen Bauelua
- (Papua New Guinea) Sandra Birum
- (Samoa) Hana Malo
- (French Polynesia) Tahia Tamarii
- (Tonga) Laveni Vaka

1 own goal

- (Fiji) Mereoni Tora (against New Zealand)
- (French Polynesia) Hana Kimitete (against Samoa)

== Awards ==
The Golden Ball Award was awarded to the most outstanding player of the tournament. The Golden Boot Award was awarded to the top scorer of the tournament. The Golden Glove Award was awarded to the best goalkeeper of the tournament. The Fair Play Award was awarded to the team with the best disciplinary record at the tournament.

Award	Recipient
Golden Ball	(New Zealand) Betsy Hassett
Golden Boot	(New Zealand) Sarah Gregorius (Papua New Guinea) Meagen Gunemba
Golden Glove	(Fiji) Adi Tuwai
Fair Play Award	New Zealand

== Qualification for international tournaments ==
=== Qualified teams for FIFA Women's World Cup ===
The following team from OFC qualified for the 2019 FIFA Women's World Cup.

Team	Qualified on	Previous appearances in FIFA Women's World Cup^{1}
New Zealand	1 December 2018	4 (1991, 2007, 2011, 2015)

^{1} Bold indicates champions for that year. Italic indicates hosts for that year.

=== Qualified teams for Summer Olympics ===
The following team from OFC qualified for the 2020 Summer Olympic women's football tournament.

Team	Qualified on	Previous appearances in Summer Olympics^{1}
New Zealand	1 December 2018	3 (2008, 2012, 2016)

^{1} Bold indicates champions for that year. Italic indicates hosts for that year.
