= Sekola Waqanidrola =

Fijian footballer

Personal information
- Date of birth: 18 March 1998 (age 28)
- Position: Defender

Team information
- Current team: Rewa

Senior career*
Years	Team	Apps	(Gls)
- Rewa

International career^{‡}
2019–	Fiji	1	(0)
- * Club domestic league appearances and goals ‡ National team caps and goals as of 18 July 2019

Sekola Waqanidrola (born 18 March 1998) is a Fijian footballer who plays as a defender for Rewa FC and the Fiji women's national team. She is the sister of Naomi Waqanidrola.

Waqanidrola is from Serua and started playing football at high school.

She was selected for the Fiji team for the 2018 OFC Women's Nations Cup. She also represented Fiji at the 2019 Pacific Games in Apia.
