= Thea Keith-Matchitt =

New Zealand-Cook Islands footballer

Thea Seraphina Keith-Matchitt (born 25 October 1994) is a New-Zealand-Cook Islands football player who plays as a goalkeeper. She has represented the Cook Islands internationally as part of the Cook Islands women's national football team.

Keith-Matchitt was born in South Waikato and studied law at the University of Waikato. She was the first female president of Tokoroa AFC. She was named WaiBOP 2018 Player of the Year, and in November 2019 she was named Sportsperson of the Year at the South Waikato District Sports Awards.

She was first selected for the Cook Islands women's national football team as part of the team for the 2018 OFC Women's Nations Cup. She was selected again for the 2019 Pacific Games squad, and for the team for the 2022 OFC Women's Nations Cup.
