= Adi Tuwai =

Fijian footballer

Personal information
- Date of birth: 9 June 1998 (age 28)
- Position: Goalkeeper

Senior career*
Years	Team	Apps	(Gls)
- Ba

International career^{‡}
2018	Fiji	4	(0)
- * Club domestic league appearances and goals ‡ National team caps and goals as of 1 December 2018

Adi Tuwai (born 9 June 1998) is a Fijian footballer who plays as a goalkeeper. She has been a member of the Fiji women's national team.

Tuwai works as a police officer.

In August 2018 she was named to the Fijian team for the 2018 OFC Women's Nations Cup.
