= Naomi Waqanidrola =

Fijian footballer

Personal information
- Full name: Naomi Tinanimotea Waqanidrola
- Date of birth: 9 July 1993 (age 33)
- Position: Defender

Team information
- Current team: Rewa

Senior career*
Years	Team	Apps	(Gls)
- Rewa

International career^{‡}
2019–	Fiji	4	(0)
- * Club domestic league appearances and goals ‡ National team caps and goals as of 18 July 2019

Naomi Tinanimotea Waqanidrola (born 9 July 1993) is a Fijian footballer who plays as a defender for Rewa FC and the Fiji women's national team. She is the sister of Sekola Waqanidrola.

Waqanidrola is vice-president of the Rewa Football Association and coaches the Rewa women's football team. In 2022 she was assistant coach of the national women's team.

In 2021 she was appointed a football ambassador by the Oceania Football Confederation as part of its women's football strategy.
