= Fidelma Watpore =

Papua New Guinean footballer

Personal information
- Date of birth: 9 February 1988 (age 38)
- Position: Goalkeeper

Team information
- Current team: POM

Senior career*
Years	Team	Apps	(Gls)
- POM

International career^{‡}
2010–	Papua New Guinea	1	(0)
- * Club domestic league appearances and goals ‡ National team caps and goals as of 18 July 2019

Fidelma Watpore (born 9 February 1988) is a Papua New Guinean footballer who plays as a goalkeeper for POM FC and the Papua New Guinea women's national team. She was awarded the Golden Glove at the 2014 OFC Women's Nation's Cup. In 2014, Papua New Guinea held 19th-ranked New Zealand to just 3–0, compared to their previous tie when New Zealand had scored 11 goals.
