= Tupou Patia =

Cook Islands footballer and referee

Tupou Patia-Brogan
- Full name: Tupou Patia-Brogan
- Born: 17 April 1984 (age 42); Rarotonga, Cook Islands

Domestic
Years	League	Role

International
Years	League	Role

Tupou Patia-Brogan (born 17 April 1984) is a football player and referee from the Cook Islands. In 2015, Patia served as a referee at the 2015 FIFA Women's World Cup in Canada, becoming the first person from the Cook Islands, male or female, to serve as a referee at a FIFA World Cup-affiliated match.

== Career ==
Patia-Brogan is from Rarotonga. Both of her parents were keen sports players, and Patia and her two sisters grew up playing volleyball, netball, football, rugby, and touch. Patia began playing football when she was 10 years old, and at the age of 15, she was selected for the national football team. She participated in a number of regional tournaments, including the Oceania Women's Championship in 2003.

In 2011, Patia was selected as a referee for the Pacific Games, which were held in New Caledonia. She also refereed at the Oceania Under-20s Women's Championship in 2014.
