= Katie Rood =

New Zealand footballer (born 1992)

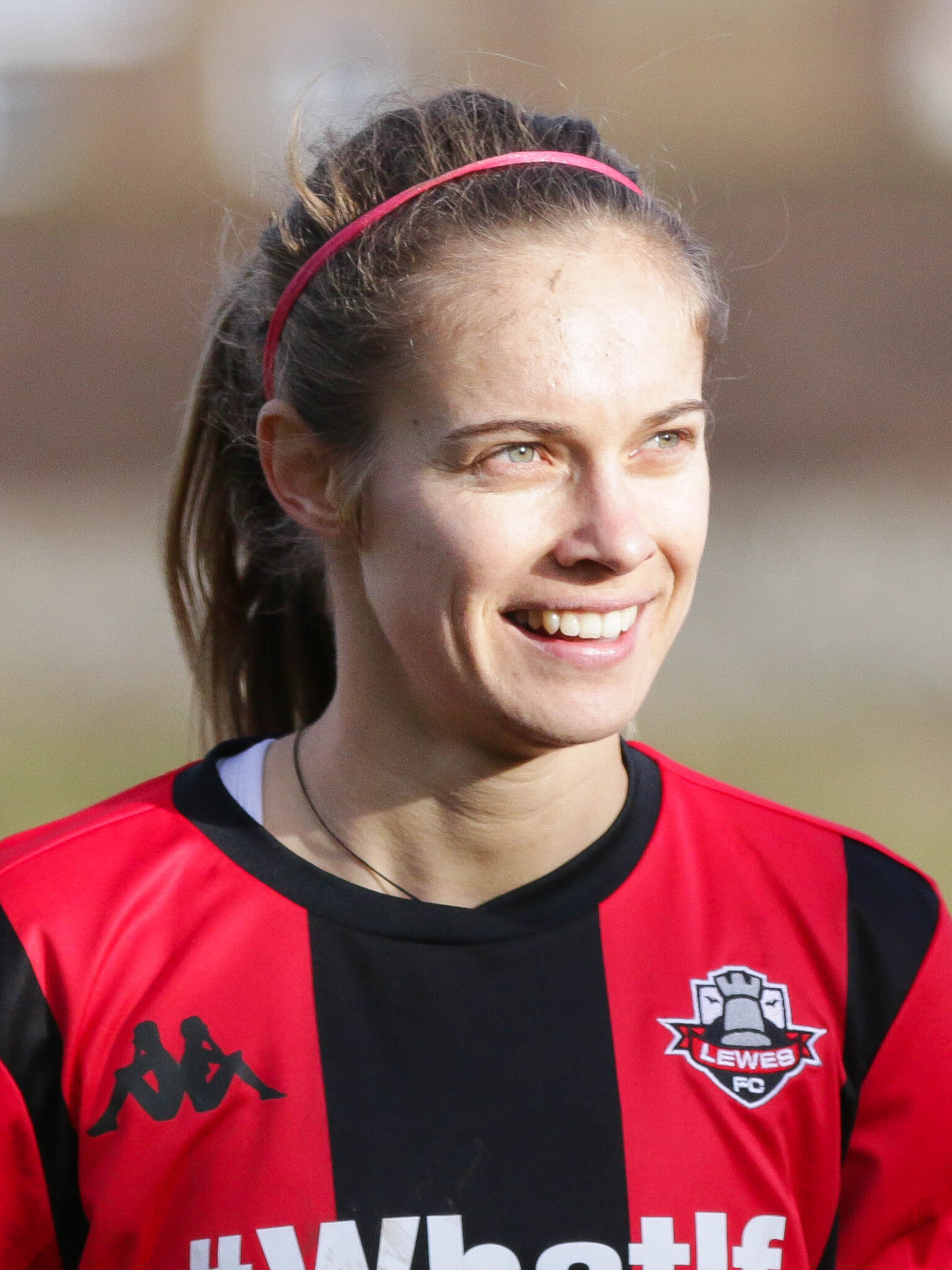
- Rood playing for Lewes in 2019

Personal information
- Full name: Kathryn Elizabeth Rood
- Date of birth: 2 September 1992 (age 34)
- Place of birth: Middlesbrough, England
- Height: 1.67 m (5 ft 6 in)
- Position: Forward

Team information
- Current team: Western Springs
- Number: 20

Senior career*
Years	Team	Apps	(Gls)
2009	North Force		
2010–2017	Glenfield Rovers		
2012	Lincoln Ladies	1	(0)
2017–2018	Juventus	6	(0)
2018–2019	Bristol City	4	(1)
2019	→ Lewes (loan)	7	(3)
2019–2021	Lewes	26	(3)
2021–2022	Southampton	12	(3)
2022–	Heart of Midlothian	23	(5)

International career^{‡}
2012	New Zealand U20	2	(0)
2017–	New Zealand	15	(5)
- * Club domestic league appearances and goals as of 1 May 2023 (UTC) ‡ National team caps and goals as of 19:59, 4 November 2017 (UTC)

Kathryn Elizabeth "Katie" Rood (born 2 September 1992) is a New Zealand professional footballer who currently plays for Western Springs in the NRFL Women's Premiership and is a former member of the New Zealand national team.

== Club career ==
Rood developed into a consistent goalscorer in her regional league for Glenfield Rovers and for Northern Football in the National Women's League.

In 2012 Rood spent a period with Lincoln Ladies of the FA WSL, and she made a substitute appearance against Doncaster Belles. She signed for newly formed Italian Serie A club Juventus in August 2017, after a successful trial. She made six appearances, scoring four goals and left after the season. Rood then signed for FA WSL Bristol City in the summer of 2018. Following a move to the South Coast, Rood played for Southampton FC Women, promoted in the 2021–22 season to the FA Women's Championship.

== International career ==
Rood played two games for New Zealand U20 during the 2012 FIFA U-20 Women's World Cup campaign. Rood played her first senior international for New Zealand women's national team in September 2017, a 5–0 defeat by the United States at Nippert Stadium, Cincinnati.

== International goals ==
No.	Date	Venue	Opponent	Score	Result	Competition
1.	22 November 2018	Stade Numa-Daly Magenta, Nouméa, New Caledonia	Cook Islands	4–0	6–0	2018 OFC Women's Nations Cup
2.	25 November 2018	Stade Numa-Daly Magenta, Nouméa, New Caledonia	Fiji	6–0	10–0	2018 OFC Women's Nations Cup
3.	25 November 2018	Stade Numa-Daly Magenta, Nouméa, New Caledonia	Fiji	8–0	10–0	2018 OFC Women's Nations Cup
4.	1 December 2018	Stade Numa-Daly Magenta, Nouméa, New Caledonia	Fiji	5–0	8–0	2018 OFC Women's Nations Cup
5.	3 March 2019	Suncorp Stadium, Brisbane, Australia	Argentina	1–0	2–0	2019 Cup of Nations

== Personal life ==
Rood is an environmentalist and in mid-2019 joined Champions for Earth. Rood is vegan.
