= Sarah Morton (footballer) =

New Zealand footballer (born 1998)

Personal information
- Full name: Sarah Jane Mahina-A-Rangi Morton
- Date of birth: 28 August 1998 (age 28)
- Place of birth: Tikokino, New Zealand
- Height: 1.66 m (5 ft 5 in)
- Position: Defender

Team information
- Current team: Western Springs

International career^{‡}
Years	Team	Apps	(Gls)
2014	New Zealand U17	3	(0)
2016–	New Zealand U20	3	(0)
2018–	New Zealand	6	(1)
- ‡ National team caps and goals as of 29 April 2019

Sarah Jane Mahina-A-Rangi Morton (born 28 August 1998) is a New Zealand footballer who currently plays for Western Springs as a centre defensive midfielder. She has represented New Zealand at both age group and senior international level.

Morton was a member of the New Zealand U-17 side at the 2014 FIFA U-17 Women's World Cup in Costa Rica, the New Zealand U-20 side at the 2016 FIFA U-20 Women's World Cup in Papua New Guinea, and again at the 2018 FIFA U-20 Women's World Cup in France. Morton is now the captain of the Waterside Karori first team who plays in the Central League. On the 26th of August 2024, Sarah scored a goal against Petone FC to help her team to a 4-2 win. Sarah coaches the Waterside Karori Women’s Third XI and led them to victory in the 2024 Capital Division 4 Women’s League.

Morton made her senior début for the Football Ferns as starting left fullback in a 1–3 loss to Japan on 10 June 2018.

== International goal ==
Scores and results list New Zealand's goal tally first.

No.	Date	Venue	Opponent	Score	Result	Competition
1.	22 November 2018	Stade Numa-Daly Magenta, Nouméa, New Caledonia	Cook Islands	5–0	6–0	2018 OFC Women's Nations Cup
