= Yvonne Gabong =

Papua New Guinean footballer

Personal information
- Date of birth: 29 August 1996 (age 30)
- Height: 1.64 m (5 ft 5 in)
- Position: Midfielder

Team information
- Current team: FC Genesis

Senior career*
Years	Team	Apps	(Gls)
- Poro
- FC Genesis

International career^{‡}
2011–	Papua New Guinea	23	(2)
Medal record
Women's football
Representing Papua New Guinea
OFC Women's Nations Cup
Runner-up	2025 Fiji
- * Club domestic league appearances and goals ‡ National team caps and goals as of 10 September 2021

Yvonne Gabong (born 29 August 1996) is a Papua New Guinean international footballer who plays as a midfielder and is co-captain of the Papua New Guinea women's national team. She is also the skipper of FC Genesis.

== Early life and education ==
Gabong is a native of Madang and Manus in Papua New Guinea. Her father, Alfred Gabong, was a soccer player who represented Papua New Guinea internationally.

She began playing football at the age of nine, representing Salvation Army Lae Primary School. Her father told her she had a future in soccer when she kicked a ball while her younger brother stood in goal, and broke his tooth.

She later attended Goroka Grammar School, and continued her tertiary studies in information technology. Gabong has said that in addition to her father, she was inspired by former PNG women's captain and midfielder Deslyn Siniu as a role model. Her younger brother, Pansop Gabong, has played as a defender in the PNG National Soccer League. They also have an older sister.

== International career ==
She made her international debut at the age of thirteen, as part of an U17 squad for Papua New Guinea that played against New Zealand at the regional championships. In 2011, Gabong was asked to join the PNG senior women's team as a flanker. She played in a particularly challenging match against New Caledonia as a newly inducted midfielder.

Gabong was part of the PNG senior women that won gold at the Pacific Games in 2015 and again in 2019. In January 2016, she appeared in the women's World Cup qualifying match against New Zealand in Lae, Morobe, which PNG lost 7–1.

Gabong was one of the first players selected for the PNG U20 squad when Papua New Guinea won the bid to host the FIFA U-20 Women's World Cup tournament. They first played against USA and Japan in the Tri Nations World Cup friendlies hosted by Papua New Guinea at Sir John Guise Stadium in Port Moresby. The National newspaper said Gabong "became the face of the nation in 2016" after leading the PNG U20 squad's "valiant" effort in the Women's World Cup.

Yvonne Gabong is currently co-captain of the PNG national women's team, together with Meagan Gunemba. On 30 July 2022, PNG defeated Fiji 2–1 in the OFC Women's Nations Cup final in Suva, Fiji. Gabong and Gunemba went on tour with the Nations Cup trophy, first visiting Madang province, where Gabong grew up.

== Club career ==
Gabong first played club football for Poro in Lae, Papua New Guinea. At the age of 24, she became the captain of FC Genesis, a new franchise, which went on to win the inaugural 2020–21 Women's National Soccer League (WNSL) Southern Conference.
