= Rosie White =

New Zealand footballer (born 1993)

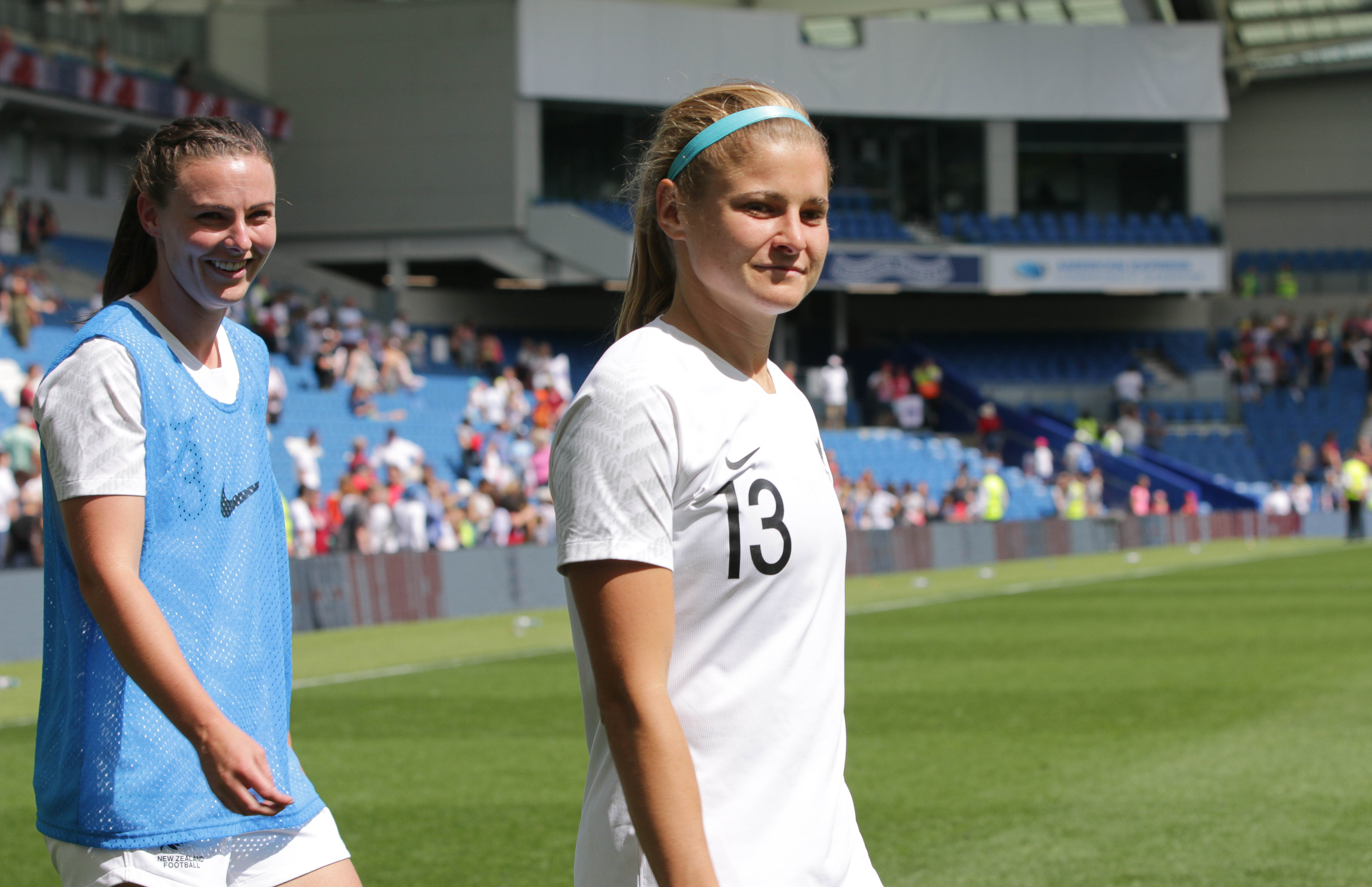
- Rosie White (right) in 2019

Personal information
- Full name: Rosemary Eleanor Florence White
- Date of birth: 6 June 1993 (age 33)
- Place of birth: Auckland, New Zealand
- Height: 1.65 m (5 ft 5 in)
- Position: Forward

College career
| Years | Team | Apps | (Gls) |
| 2011–2014 | UCLA Bruins | 83 | (17) |

Senior career*
| Years | Team | Apps | (Gls) |
- Western Springs AFC
- Lynn-Avon United
| | Three Kings United | 20 | (50) |
| 2015–2016 | Liverpool | 22 | (4) |
| 2017 | Boston Breakers | 22 | (4) |
| 2018 | Chicago Red Stars | 12 | (1) |
| 2019–2021 | OL Reign | 14 | (3) |

International career^{‡}
| 2008–2010 | New Zealand U-17 | 3 | (3) |
| 2008–2012 | New Zealand U-20 | 15 | (16) |
| 2009–2021 | New Zealand | 110 | (24) |
- * Club domestic league appearances and goals as of 21 November 2019 ‡ National team caps and goals as of 10 March 2020

Rosemary Eleanor Florence White (born 6 June 1993) is a New Zealand former footballer who played as a midfielder.

== Club career ==
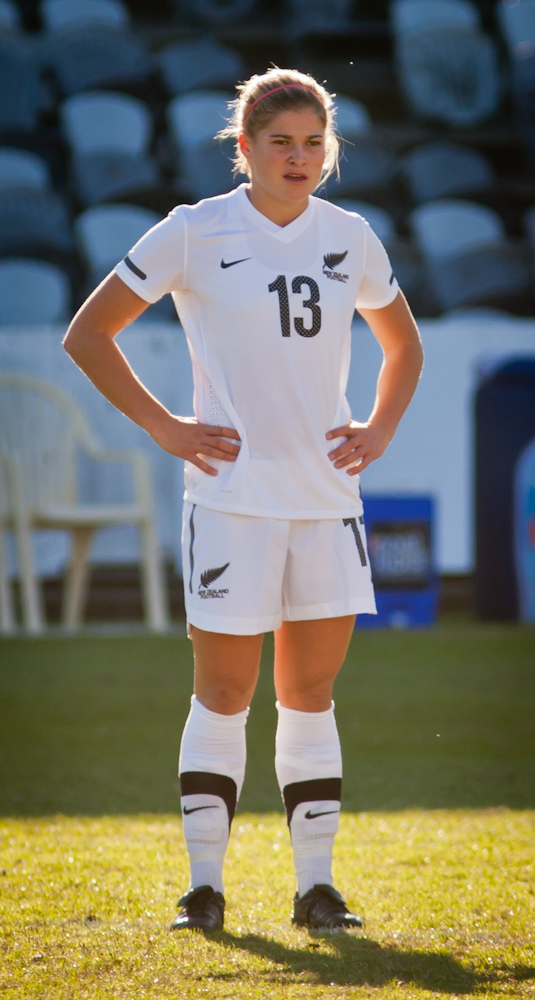
White playing for New Zealand in 2011

In July 2015, White signed for English FA WSL champions Liverpool Ladies. Liverpool manager Matt Beard expected White to increase the team's attacking options. In 2015 Liverpool slumped to a seventh-place finish, but White was handed a new contract in November 2015.

On 9 November 2016, she signed with the Boston Breakers of the NWSL where she reunited with former Liverpool head coach Matt Beard. White played in 22 games for Boston and scored 4 goals.

After the Boston Breakers folded ahead of the 2018 NWSL season, White was selected by the Chicago Red Stars with the 7th pick in the Breakers Dispersal Draft on 30 January 2018. She began the 2018 season on the 45-day disabled list as she recovered from right and left navicular fractures. White made her debut for the Red Stars on 26 May against the Orlando Pride. White made 12 appearances and scored 1 goal for the Red Stars in 2018.

Ahead of the 2019 NWSL season the Red Stars announced that White would not be returning to the team in order to prepare for the 2019 FIFA Women's World Cup with New Zealand. Both the club and White will re-evaluate the possibility of a return to the team after the World Cup.

After the 2019 FIFA Women's World Cup, White signed with Reign FC on July 16, 2019.

In December 2021, OL Reign waived the rights to White and she left the club.

== International career ==
White is a New Zealand international. She previously represented her country at the under-17 and under-20 levels.

White achieved a unique double by scoring a hat-trick against Colombia in the 2008 FIFA U-17 Women's World Cup and a second against Chile in the 2008 FIFA U-20 Women's World Cup two weeks later. In 2010, she represented New Zealand at the 2010 FIFA U-20 Women's World Cup in Germany, appearing in all three group games.

White made her senior Football Ferns debut as a substitute in a 0–6 loss to China PR on 10 January 2009. Having been a prolific scorer for the Under-17 and Under-20 teams, White remained goalless for the Football Ferns until her 14th appearance when she scored in a 14–0 win over Vanuatu on 29 September 2010.

She played in two matches out of New Zealand's three in each of FIFA Women's World Cup in Germany 2011 and Canada 2015.

In July 2016, White was named to the Football Ferns' squad for the 2016 Summer Olympics. She appeared in two of New Zealand's three matches, both as second-half substitutes.

== International goals ==
| No. | Date | Venue | Opponent | Score | Result | Competition | Ref |
|---|---|---|---|---|---|---|---|
| 1. | 29 September 2010 | North Harbour Stadium, Auckland, New Zealand | Vanuatu | 8–0 | 14–0 | 2010 OFC Women's Championship | |
| 2. | 6 October 2010 | North Harbour Stadium, Auckland, New Zealand | Solomon Islands | 1–0 | 8–0 | 2010 OFC Women's Championship | |
| 3. | 6 October 2010 | North Harbour Stadium, Auckland, New Zealand | Solomon Islands | 8–0 | 8–0 | 2010 OFC Women's Championship | |
| 4. | 8 October 2010 | North Harbour Stadium, Auckland, New Zealand | Papua New Guinea | 2–0 | 11–0 | 2010 OFC Women's Championship | |
| 5. | 8 October 2010 | North Harbour Stadium, Auckland, New Zealand | Papua New Guinea | 6–0 | 11–0 | 2010 OFC Women's Championship | |
| 6. | 8 October 2010 | North Harbour Stadium, Auckland, New Zealand | Papua New Guinea | 7–0 | 11–0 | 2010 OFC Women's Championship | |
| 7. | 8 October 2010 | North Harbour Stadium, Auckland, New Zealand | Papua New Guinea | 8–0 | 11–0 | 2010 OFC Women's Championship | |
| 8. | 31 March 2012 | Toll Stadium, Whangārei, New Zealand | Papua New Guinea | 5–0 | 8–0 | 2012 OFC Women's Olympic Qualifying Tournament | |
| 9. | 31 March 2012 | Toll Stadium, Whangārei, New Zealand | Papua New Guinea | 7–0 | 8–0 | 2012 OFC Women's Olympic Qualifying Tournament | |
| 10. | 25 September 2013 | Stade St-Germain, Savièse, Switzerland | China | 3–0 | 4–0 | 2013 Valais Women's Cup | |
| 11. | 16 June 2014 | Mount Smart Stadium, Auckland, New Zealand | Brazil | 1–1 | 1–1 | Friendly | |
| 12. | 25 October 2014 | Kalabond Oval, Kokopo, Papua New Guinea | Tonga | 6–0 | 16–0 | 2014 OFC Women's Nations Cup | |
| 13. | 25 October 2014 | Kalabond Oval, Kokopo, Papua New Guinea | Tonga | 7–0 | 16–0 | 2014 OFC Women's Nations Cup | |
| 14. | 29 October 2014 | Kalabond Oval, Kokopo, Papua New Guinea | Cook Islands | 6–0 | 11–0 | 2014 OFC Women's Nations Cup | |
| 15. | 1 March 2017 | Ammochostos Stadium, Larnaca, Cyprus | Scotland | 1–0 | 2–3 | 2017 Cyprus Women's Cup | |
| 16. | 8 March 2017 | Tasos Markos Stadium, Paralimni, Cyprus | Hungary | 2–0 | 3–1 | 2017 Cyprus Women's Cup | |
| 17. | 8 March 2017 | Tasos Markos Stadium, Paralimni, Cyprus | Hungary | 3–0 | 3–1 | 2017 Cyprus Women's Cup | |
| 18. | 19 November 2018 | Stade Numa-Daly Magenta, Nouméa, New Caledonia | Tonga | 1–0 | 11–0 | 2018 OFC Women's Nations Cup | |
| 19. | 19 November 2018 | Stade Numa-Daly Magenta, Nouméa, New Caledonia | Tonga | 4–0 | 11–0 | 2018 OFC Women's Nations Cup | |
| 20. | 28 November 2018 | Stade de Hnassé, Lifou, New Caledonia | New Caledonia | 6–0 | 8–0 | 2018 OFC Women's Nations Cup | |
| 21. | 28 November 2018 | Stade de Hnassé, Lifou, New Caledonia | New Caledonia | 8–0 | 8–0 | 2018 OFC Women's Nations Cup | |
| 22. | 1 December 2018 | Stade Numa-Daly Magenta, Nouméa, New Caledonia | Fiji | 1–0 | 8–0 | 2018 OFC Women's Nations Cup | |
| 23. | 1 December 2018 | Stade Numa-Daly Magenta, Nouméa, New Caledonia | Fiji | 8–0 | 8–0 | 2018 OFC Women's Nations Cup | |
| 24. | 9 April 2019 | Marbella Football Center, Marbella, Spain | Norway | 1–0 | 1–0 | Friendly | |
