= Ria Percival =

New Zealand footballer (born 1989)

Ria Percival MNZM
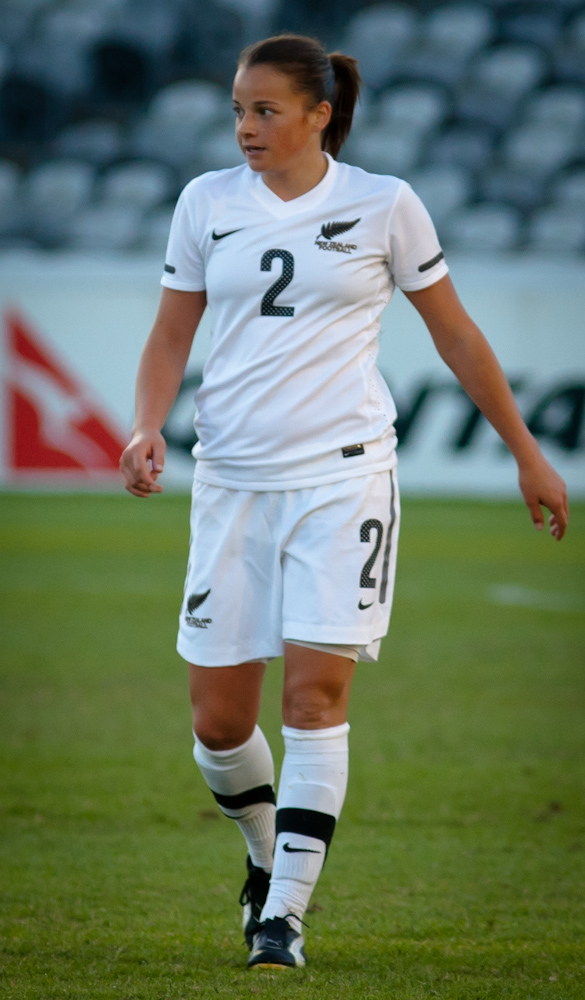
- Percival with New Zealand in 2011

Personal information
- Full name: Ria Dawn Percival
- Date of birth: 7 December 1989 (age 36)
- Place of birth: Basildon, Essex, England
- Height: 1.61 m (5 ft 3 in)
- Position: Defensive midfielder

Youth career
- 2000–2003: Colchester United

Senior career*
Years	Team	Apps	(Gls)
2006–2008	Lynn-Avon United	37	(14)
2008–2010	F.C. Indiana	7	(1)
2010–2011	Ottawa Fury		
2011–2012	FFC Frankfurt	21	(0)
2012–2016	FF USV Jena	77	(6)
2016–2018	FC Basel		
2018–2019	West Ham United	16	(0)
2019–2024	Tottenham Hotspur	57	(3)
2024	→ Crystal Palace (loan)	11	(1)

International career^{‡}
- New Zealand U-20
2006–2024	New Zealand	166	(15)
- * Club domestic league appearances and goals as of 22 February 2025 ‡ National team caps and goals as of 22 February 2025

Ria Dawn Percival MNZM (born 7 December 1989) is a professional footballer who plays as a defensive midfielder. She last played for Crystal Palace, on loan from Tottenham Hotspur. Born in England, she played for the New Zealand women's national team and represented New Zealand 166 times, more than any other player, male or female. She previously played for FFC Frankfurt and FF USV Jena of the Bundesliga, FC Basel in the Swiss league and West Ham United.

== International ==
Percival represented New Zealand at age group level, appearing at the 2006 Women's U-20 World Cup finals in Russia and again at the 2008 Women's U-20 World Cup in Chile, where she scored both of New Zealand's goals in their 3–2 loss to Nigeria.

Percival made her senior debut in a 0–3 loss to China PR on 14 November 2006, before representing New Zealand at the 2007 FIFA Women's World Cup finals in China, where they lost to Brazil 0–5, Denmark (0–2) and China PR (0–2).

Percival was also included in the New Zealand squad for the 2008 Summer Olympics, again in China, where they drew with Japan (2–2) before losing to Norway (0–1) and the United States (0–4).

On 9 March 2011, Percival earned her 50th A-level international cap in a 5–0 loss to Mexico in the play-off for 7th place at the Cyprus Cup.

Percival contested her fifth major tournament when she appeared in all three of New Zealand's matches at the 2011 FIFA Women's World Cup in Germany. She appeared in all four of New Zealand's games at the 2012 Summer Olympics.

She again featured in all three of New Zealand's matches at the 2015 FIFA Women's World Cup in Canada, taking her to a tally of 9 World Cup matches. She appeared in all three of New Zealand's games at the 2016 Summer Olympics.

In April 2024, Percival announced her retirement from international football.

== Career statistics ==
=== International goals ===
Updated 28 June 2020

Scores and results list New Zealand's goal tally first, score column indicates score after each Percival goal.

List of international goals scored by Ria Percival
No.	Date	Venue	Opponent	Score	Result	Competition
1	11 April 2007	Sir Ignatius Kilage Stadium, Lae, Papua New Guinea	Solomon Islands	4–0	8–0	2007 OFC Women's Championship
2	13 April 2007	Sir Ignatius Kilage Stadium, Lae, Papua New Guinea	Papua New Guinea	3–0	7–0	2007 OFC Women's Championship
3	7 March 2009	GSP Stadium, Nicosia, Cyprus	Russia	1–0	4–2	2009 Cyprus Women's Cup
4	1 October 2010	North Harbour Stadium, Auckland, New Zealand	Cook Islands	6–0	10–0	2010 OFC Women's Championship
5	3 October 2010	North Harbour Stadium, Auckland, New Zealand	Tahiti	7–0	7–0	2010 OFC Women's Championship
6	6 October 2010	North Harbour Stadium, Auckland, New Zealand	Solomon Islands	2–0	8–0	2010 OFC Women's Championship
7	8 October 2010	North Harbour Stadium, Auckland, New Zealand	Papua New Guinea	3–0	11–0	2010 OFC Women's Championship
8	31 March 2012	Toll Stadium, Whangārei, New Zealand	Papua New Guinea	6–0	8–0	2012 Olympic qualifying
9	25 October 2014	Kalabond Oval, Kokopo, Papua New Guinea	Tonga	16–0	16–0	2014 OFC Women's Nations Cup
10	29 October 2014	Kalabond Oval, Kokopo, Papua New Guinea	Cook Islands	5–0	11–0	2014 OFC Women's Nations Cup
11	15 January 2015	Spice Hotel, Belek, Turkey	Denmark	1–1	3–2	Friendly
12	28 November 2017	SCG Stadium, Muang Thong Thani, Thailand	Thailand	3–0	5–0	Friendly
13	28 November 2017	SCG Stadium, Muang Thong Thani, Thailand	Thailand	5–0	5–0	Friendly
14	19 November 2018	Stade Numa-Daly Magenta, Nouméa, New Caledonia	Tonga	10–0	11–0	2018 OFC Women's Nations Cup
15	23 October 2021	TD Place Stadium, Ottawa, Canada	Canada	1–3	1–5	Friendly

== Honours ==
Individual

- IFFHS OFC Best Woman Player of the Decade 2011–2020
- IFFHS OFC Woman Team of the Decade 2011–2020

In the 2024 New Year Honours, Percival was appointed a Member of the New Zealand Order of Merit, for services to football.
