= Betsy Hassett =

New Zealand footballer (born 1990)

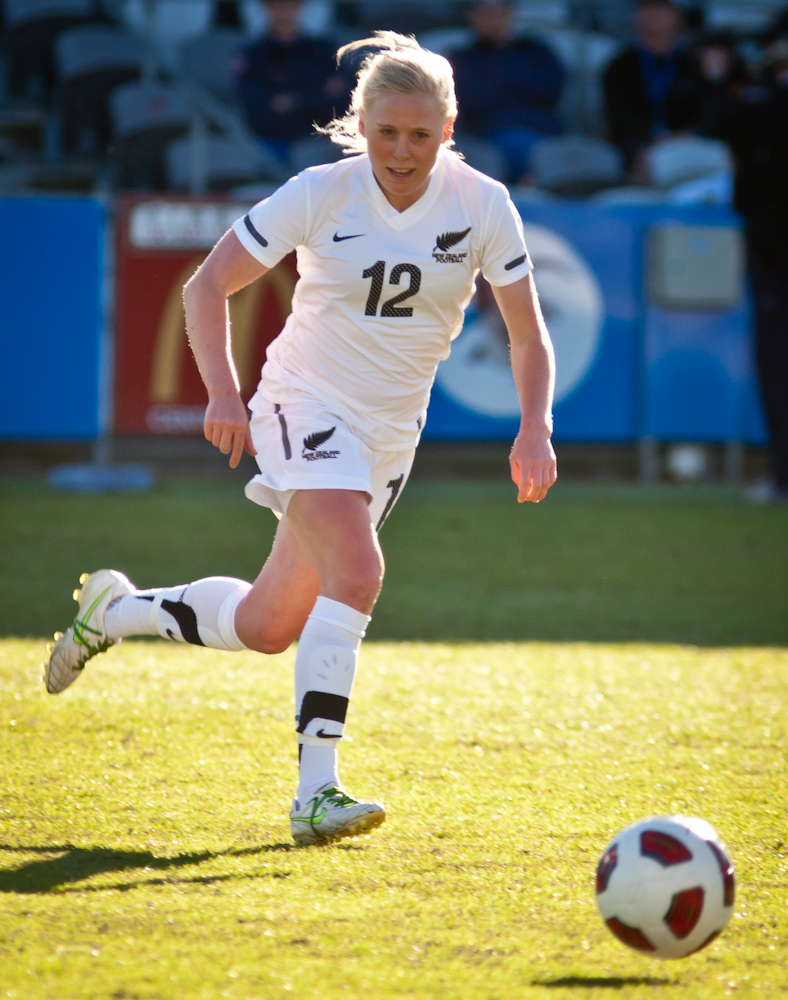
- Hassett in 2011

Personal information
- Full name: Betsy Doon Hassett
- Date of birth: 4 August 1990 (age 36)
- Place of birth: Auckland, New Zealand
- Height: 1.58 m (5 ft 2 in)
- Positions: Attacking midfielder; right winger

College career
Years	Team	Apps	(Gls)
2009–2012	California Golden Bears	64	(7)

Senior career*
Years	Team	Apps	(Gls)
2013	SC Sand	10	(11)
2014	Manchester City	13	(0)
2015	Amazon Grimstad	11	(1)
2016	Werder Bremen	10	(1)
2016–2017	Ajax	20	(2)
2017–2019	KR	38	(3)
2020–2022	Stjarnan	54	(9)
2022–2023	Wellington Phoenix	15	(2)
2023–2025	Stjarnan	39	(2)

International career
2008–2010	New Zealand U-20	10	(1)
2008–2025	New Zealand	160	(16)
- * Club domestic league appearances and goals

Betsy Doon Hassett (born 4 August 1990) is a New Zealand former professional footballer who played as an attacking midfielder or a right winger. She previously played for German side SC Sand, English club Manchester City, Amazon Grimstad in Norway, Werder Bremen in Germany's Frauen-Bundesliga, Dutch club Ajax and Icelandic clubs KR and Stjarnan. She represented New Zealand at the 2011 and 2015 FIFA Women's World Cup, as well as the 2012, 2016 and 2020 Summer Olympics.

== Early life ==
Born in the Auckland suburb of Titirangi, Hassett began playing football at the age of four with her brothers. She was captain of Avondale College First XI Girls Football team in 2008 and led them to third place at the National Schools Tournament.

== College career ==
Hassett attended the University of California, Berkeley where she played for the California Golden Bears from 2009 to 2012. Due to injuries, Hassett had limited playing time in her first year but in her second year she played in 15 games, starting 11 and was the sole Bear on the Pac-10 all-academic second team. During her junior year, she played in all 22 matches with 18 starts in the midfield. She was a Second-Team All-Pac-12 selection and Third Team NSCAA Scholar All-American. She was also named to the 2011 Pac-12 All-Academic team. As a senior, Hassett started in nineteen of the twenty regular season games. From her central mid-field position she scored 6 goals and assisted on 5 goals. She was one of only two California players earning highest All Pac-12 honours by being named to the All-Pac-12 First Team.

== Club career ==
Hassett signed for German second tier side SC Sand in 2013. She scored 11 goals in her ten appearances for the club during the 2012–13 season. SC Sand finished in third place during the regular season with a 17–2–3 record.

In 2014, Hassett signed for Manchester City in England. Of her signing, she said, "I like the idea of being part of a side that's entering the FA WSL for the first time. This way we can start from scratch with a new style and I can play to my strengths rather than trying to adapt to an already existing and established environment." Hassett started in 11 of the 13 matches in which she played. Manchester finished its inaugural season in the FA Women's Super League (FA WSL) in fifth place with a 6–7–1 record.

Hassett played for Norwegian Toppserien club Amazon Grimstad during the 2015 season. The club was facing the threat of relegation as the last place team in the league. Hassett made 11 appearances for the club and scored a goal in the team's 2–0 win over Medkila. The team finished in last place with a 4–14–4 record.

After signing with SV Werder Bremen in the German Frauen-Bundesliga for the 2015–16 season, Hassett made eight starts in her ten appearances for the club. During a match against SC Freiburg on 20 March 2016, she scored the game-winning goal. The club finished in 11th place with a 3–15–4 record.

In July 2016, Hassett transferred to Ajax in the Netherlands' Eredivisie for the 2016–17 season. Ajax finished in first place during the regular season with a 17–1–3 record 15 points ahead of the second place team. After winning the championship, Ajax secured a spot in the 2017–18 UEFA Women's Champions League, a first for the club.

In July 2017, Hassett signed with Úrvalsdeild kvenna club KR. After three seasons with KR, she signed with Stjarnan in March 2020.

In July 2022, after 14 years playing abroad, Hassett returned to her homeland, signing with New Zealand's only professional women's club Wellington Phoenix.

In May 2023, Hassett returned to Iceland and play for Stjarnan.

She retired in 2026.

== International career ==
=== Youth ===
Hassett was a member of the New Zealand squad in the 2008 FIFA U-20 Women's World Cup playing all three group games; a 3–2 loss to Nigeria, a 4–3 win over hosts Chile and a 1–1 draw with England. In 2010, she played all three group games in the 2010 FIFA U-20 Women's World Cup.

=== Senior ===
Hassett made her senior Football Ferns debut in a 1–0 win over Argentina on 16 June 2008. She played in Germany at the 2011 FIFA Women's World Cup with New Zealand, seeing time in all three games. In 2012, she represented her country at the London Olympics, helping the Football Ferns become the first New Zealand team to advance to the second round in a major FIFA tournament. She played in all four games with three starts. Hassett featured in all three of New Zealand's matches at the 2015 FIFA Women's World Cup in Canada. She also featured in all three of New Zealand's matches at the 2016 Olympics. On 24 July 2021, Hassett scored New Zealand's lone goal in a 6–1 loss against the United States in the 2020 Olympics.

== Career statistics ==
Scores and results list New Zealand's goal tally first, score column indicates score after each Hassett goal.

List of international goals scored by Betsy Hassett
No.	Date	Venue	Opponent	Score	Result	Competition
1	5 March 2009	Paralimni Stadium, Paralimni, Cyprus	Canada	1–1	1–1	2009 Cyprus Women's Cup
2	4 March 2011	GSZ Stadium, Larnaca, Cyprus	Switzerland	2–0	2–1	2011 Cyprus Women's Cup
3	4 April 2012	PMRL Stadium, Port Moresby, Papua New Guinea	Papua New Guinea	6–0	7–0	2012 OFC Women's Olympic Qualifying Tournament
4	13 March 2013	GSZ Stadium, Larnaca, Cyprus	Switzerland	1–1	2–1	2013 Cyprus Women's Cup
5	25 October 2014	Kalabond Oval, Kokopo, Papua New Guinea	Tonga	3–0	16–0	2014 OFC Women's Nations Cup
6	29 October 2014	Kalabond Oval, Kokopo, Papua New Guinea	Cook Islands	11–0	11–0	2014 OFC Women's Nations Cup
7	19 November 2018	Stade Numa-Daly Magenta, Nouméa, New Caledonia	Tonga	5–0	11–0	2018 OFC Women's Nations Cup
8	19 November 2018	Stade Numa-Daly Magenta, Nouméa, New Caledonia	Tonga	6–0	11–0	2018 OFC Women's Nations Cup
9	28 November 2018	Stade de Hnassé, Lifou, New Caledonia	New Caledonia	1–0	8–0	2018 OFC Women's Nations Cup
10	1 December 2021	Stade Numa-Daly Magenta, Nouméa, New Caledonia	Fiji	3–0	8–0	2018 OFC Women's Nations Cup
11	1 December 2021	Stade Numa-Daly Magenta, Nouméa, New Caledonia	Fiji	6–0	8–0	2018 OFC Women's Nations Cup
12	24 July 2021	Saitama Stadium, Saitama, Japan	United States	1–3	1–6	2020 Summer Olympics
13	26 September 2023	Quilín Complex, Santiago, Chile	Chile	1–1	1–2	Friendly
14	13 February 2024	FFS Football Stadium, Apia, Samoa	Vanuatu	2–0	5–0	2024 OFC Women's Olympic Qualifying Tournament

== Honours ==
Manchester City

- Women's Super League Cup: 2014

Ajax

- Eredivisie: 2016–17
- KNVB Women's Cup: 2016–17
- OFC Women's Nations Cup: 2014

Individual

- IFFHS OFC Woman Team of the Decade 2011–2020

== See also ==
- Foreign players in the FA WSL
- List of New Zealand women's international footballers
- New Zealand at the 2012 Summer Olympics
- List of AFC Ajax (women) players
