= Katie Bowen =

New Zealand footballer (born 1994)

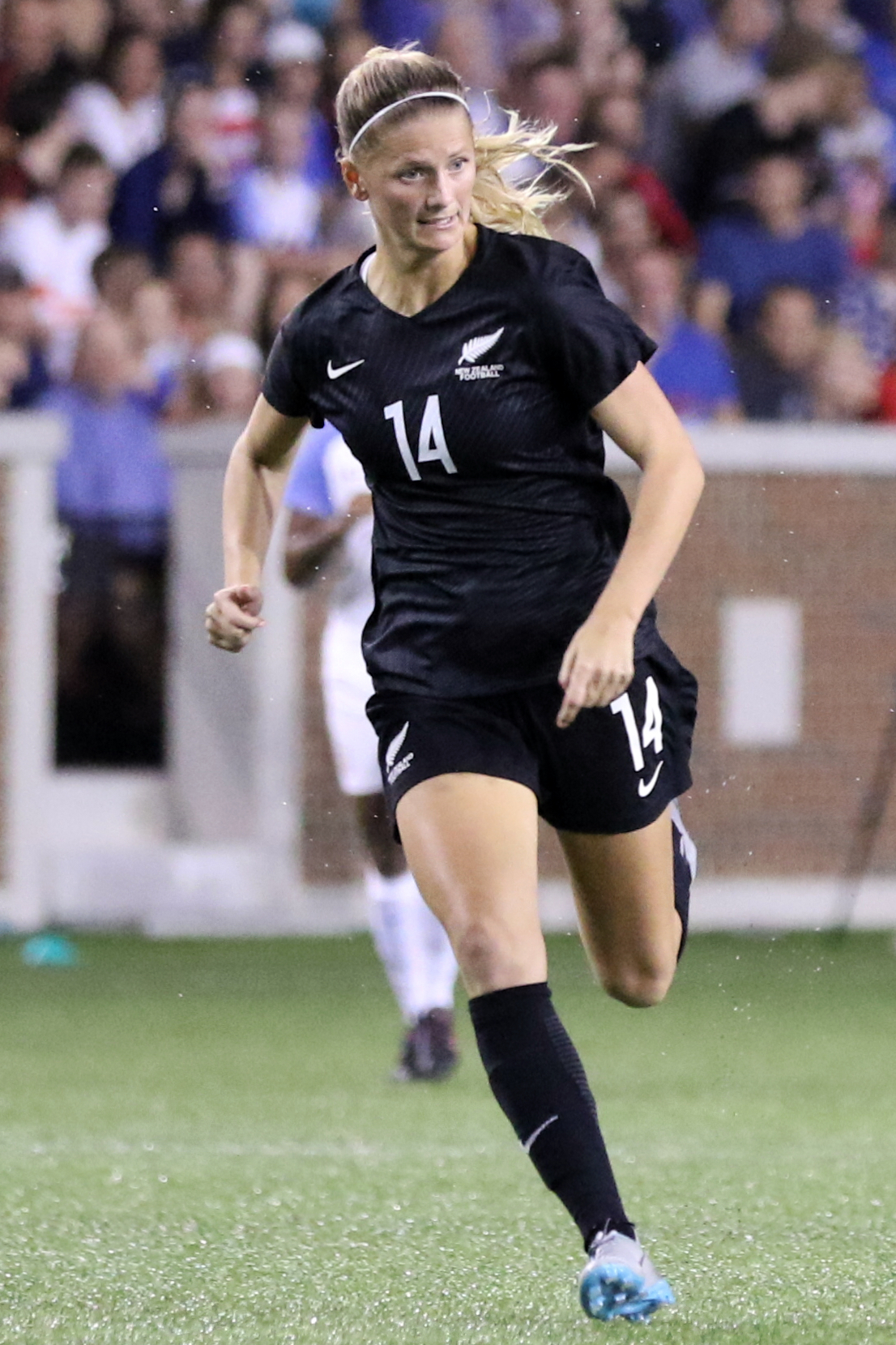
- Bowen playing for New Zealand in 2017

Personal information
- Full name: Kate Elizabeth Bowen
- Date of birth: 15 April 1994 (age 32)
- Place of birth: Auckland, New Zealand
- Height: 1.73 m (5 ft 8 in)
- Position: Defensive midfielder

Team information
- Current team: Fenerbahçe
- Number: 14

Youth career
- Glenfield Rovers

College career
Years	Team	Apps	(Gls)
2012–2015	North Carolina Tar Heels	66	(1)

Senior career*
Years	Team	Apps	(Gls)
2016–2017	FC Kansas City	34	(2)
2018–2020	Utah Royals	42	(0)
2021	Kansas City Current	17	(0)
2022	North Carolina Courage	2	(0)
2022–2023	Melbourne City	19	(0)
2023–2026	Inter Milan	62	(0)
2026–	Fenerbahçe	0	(0)

International career^{‡}
2008–2010	New Zealand U17		
2012–2014	New Zealand U20		
2011–	New Zealand	116	(4)
- * Club domestic league appearances and goals as of 25 May 2026. ‡ National team caps and goals as of 25 May 2026.

Kate Elizabeth Bowen (born 15 April 1994) is a New Zealand professional footballer who plays as a defensive midfielder for Fenerbahçe of the Turkish Women's Super League and the New Zealand national team.

== Early life ==
=== University of North Carolina ===
Bowen attended the University of North Carolina from 2012 to 2015, she was a part of the National Championship winning team in 2012.

== Club career ==
=== FC Kansas City, 2016–2017 ===
Bowen was selected by FC Kansas City with the 16th pick in the 2016 NWSL College Draft. Bowen appeared in 13 games in 2016. In 2017 she appeared in 22 games for FCKC and scored two goals.

=== Utah Royals FC, 2018–2020 ===
After FC Kansas City ceased operations after the 2017 season, Bowen was officially added to the roster of the Utah Royals FC on 8 February 2018. She appeared in 19 matches for Utah in 2018, the Royals finished in 5th place and did not qualify for the playoffs.

Bowen returned to Utah for the 2019 NWSL season. She would miss several matches due to her participation in the 2019 Women's World Cup.

=== Kansas City, 2021 ===
Kansas City waived Bowen in December 2021.

=== North Carolina Courage, 2022 ===
North Carolina Courage signed Bowen on 21 January 2022, to a one-year contract with an option to renew for the 2023 season. After playing in the 2022 NWSL Challenge Cup and making two appearances in the National Women's Soccer League, she was granted an early release to join an Australian club before the beginning of the 2022–23 A-League Women season.

=== Melbourne City, 2022 ===
In November 2022, Bowen signed with Australian club Melbourne City.

=== Inter, 2023 ===
Italian club Inter signed Bowen on 8 September 2023, for the 2023 season with a one-year extension option.

== International career ==
Born in Auckland, Bowen became the youngest player to represent New Zealand at recognised international level when she played in a New Zealand U-17 match against Australia U-17 on her 14th birthday in 2008. Later that year she travelled to the 2008 FIFA U-17 Women's World Cup where she made a solitary appearance as a late substitute in a 3–1 win over Colombia. She again represented New Zealand in 2010, this time as captain at the 2008 FIFA U-17 Women's World Cup in Trinidad and Tobago.

Bowen made her senior international début as a substitute in a 0–3 loss to Australia on 12 May 2011.

She featured in two of New Zealand's three matches at the 2011 FIFA Women's World Cup in Germany and in all three of her country's matches at the 2015 FIFA Women's World Cup in Canada. After being an alternate at the 2012 Olympics, Bowen was named to the 18-player roster for the 2016 Olympics in Rio where she appeared in all 3 matches for New Zealand.

In 2019, Bowen participated in her third World Cup. She played every minute of New Zealand's three group stage matches at the World Cup in France, they lost all three matches and did not advance to the knockout round.

On 25 June 2021, Bowen was called up to the New Zealand squad for the delayed 2020 Summer Olympics.

Bowen was called up to the New Zealand squad for the 2023 FIFA Women's World Cup.

On 4 July 2024, Bowen was called up to the New Zealand squad for the 2024 Summer Olympics.

== International goals ==
Scores and results list New Zealand's goal tally first.

No.	Date	Venue	Opponent	Score	Result	Competition
1.	7 June 2016	Etihad Stadium, Melbourne, Australia	Australia	1–0	1–1	Friendly
2.	28 November 2017	PAT Stadium, Bangkok, Thailand	Thailand	2–0	5–0	Friendly
3.	28 November 2018	Stade de Hnassé, Lifou, New Caledonia	New Caledonia	4–0	8–0	2018 OFC Women's Nations Cup
4.	19 February 2024	FFS Football Stadium, Apia, Samoa	Solomon Islands	3–0	11–1	2024 OFC Women's Olympic Qualifying Tournament

== Honours ==
=== College ===
University of North Carolina

- NCAA Women's Soccer Championship: 2012

=== International ===
- OFC Women's Nations Cup: 2018
