= 1983 OFC Women's Championship =

Coupe d'Océanie féminine de football 1983

Tournament details
- Host country: New Caledonia
- Dates: 28 November – 4 December 1983
- Teams: 4 (from 1 confederation)
- Venue: 1 (in 1 host city)

Final positions
- Champions: New Zealand (1st title)
- Runners-up: Australia
- Third place: New Caledonia
- Fourth place: Fiji

Tournament statistics
- Matches played: 7

The 1983 OFC Women's Championship was the first OFC Women's Championship of women's association football (also known as the OFC Women's Nations Cup).

== First round ==
Pos	Team	Pld	W	D	L	GF	GA	GD	Pts	Qualification
1	New Zealand	3	2	1	0	21	1	+20	5	Advance to Final
2	Australia	3	2	1	0	18	0	+18	5	Advance to Final
3	New Caledonia (H)	3	1	0	2	2	11	−9	2	
4	Fiji	3	0	0	3	1	30	−29	0	

Source: RSSSF
(H) Hosts
28 November 1983

New Caledonia	2–0	Fiji

Nouméa
28 November 1983

New Zealand	0–0	Australia

Nouméa

30 November 1983

New Caledonia	0–5	Australia

Nouméa
30 November 1983

New Zealand	15–1	Fiji

Nouméa

2 December 1983

Australia	13–0	Fiji

Nouméa
2 December 1983

New Caledonia	0–6	New Zealand

Nouméa

== Final ==
4 December 1983

New Zealand	3–2	Australia

Nouméa

== Awards ==
1983 OFC Women's Championship winners

New Zealand
First title
