= Anna Green (footballer) =

New Zealand footballer

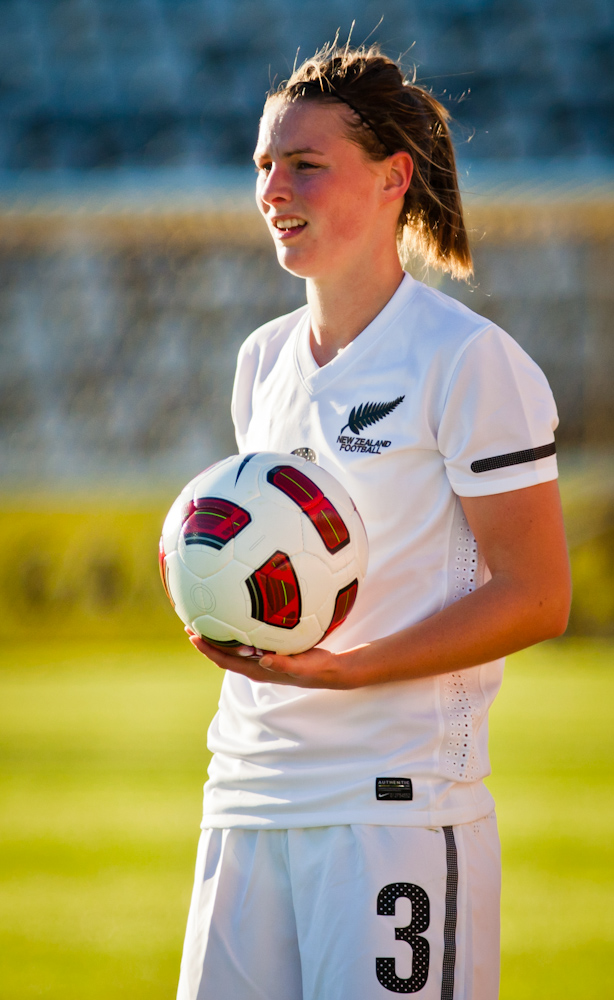

Personal information
- Full name: Anna Green
- Date of birth: 20 August 1990 (age 36)
- Place of birth: Stockport, England
- Height: 1.67 m (5 ft 6 in)
- Position: Defender

Senior career*
Years	Team	Apps	(Gls)
- Three Kings United
- Eastern Suburbs A.F.C.
2011	Adelaide United	10	(0)
2012–2013	Lokomotive Leipzig	31	(3)
2013–2014	Sydney FC	2	(0)
2014–2015	Notts County	1	(0)
2016	Mallbackens	21	(1)
2017–2018	Reading	11	(0)
2018–2022	Capital Football		
2022–2023	Sydney FC	7	(0)

International career^{‡}
2008–2010	New Zealand U-20	13	(0)
2006–2023	New Zealand	78	(7)
- * Club domestic league appearances and goals as of 13 June 2023 ‡ National team caps and goals as of 29 April 2019

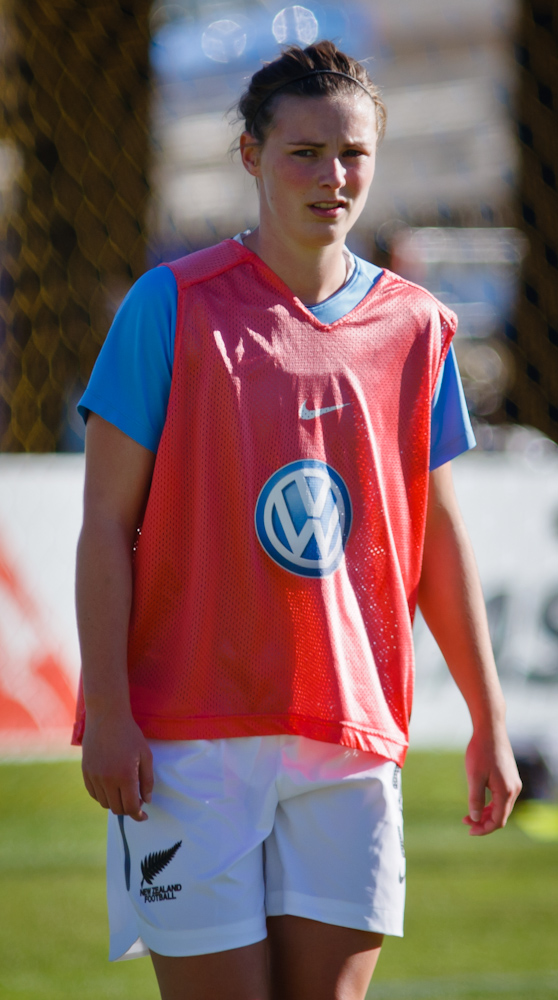

Anna Green (born 20 August 1990), is a former association footballer who played as a Defender. She has also played for Three Kings United (ASB League), Adelaide United and Lokomotive Leipzig (Bundesliga).

In January 2014 Green agreed a transfer to Notts County of the FA WSL. Under the terms of the deal she would join the English club after finishing the Australian season with Sydney FC and taking part in the Cyprus Cup. After seeing out her contract with Reading, Green decided to return to New Zealand and play part-time in the National Women's League while working as an accountant.

== International career ==
Green made her international debut as a substitute in a 0–3 loss to China on 14 November 2006. She was included in the New Zealand squad for the 2008 Summer Olympics, featuring in the losses to Norway (0–1) and Brazil (0–4).

Green travelled with the New Zealand U-20 squad to the 2008 Women's U-20 World Cup finals in Chile, again featuring in two of New Zealand's group games. In 2010, she represented New Zealand at the 2010 FIFA U-20 Women's World Cup in Germany, appearing in all three group games. She was also part of the squad at the 2015 FIFA Women's World Cup in Canada.
