= Sarah Gregorius =

New Zealand footballer (born 1987)

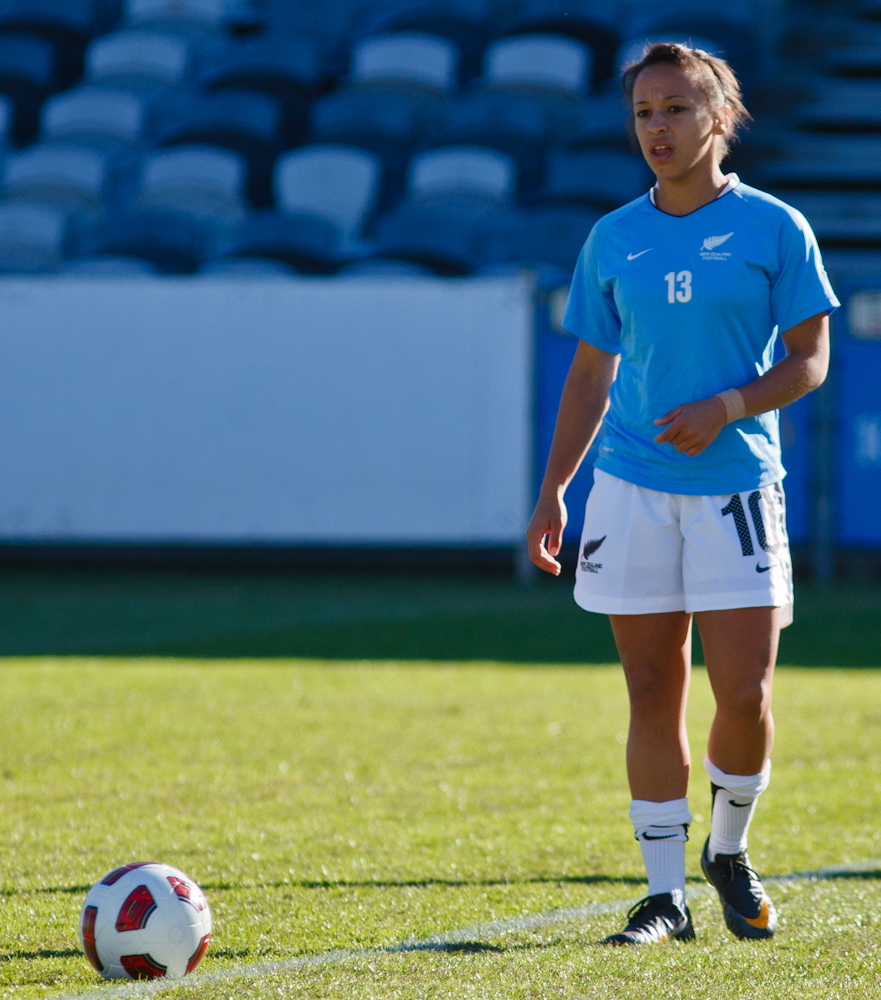

Personal information
- Full name: Sarah Joelle Gregorius
- Date of birth: 6 August 1987 (age 39)
- Place of birth: Lower Hutt, New Zealand
- Height: 1.57 m (5 ft 2 in)
- Position: Striker

Team information
- Current team: Miramar Rangers

Senior career*
Years	Team	Apps	(Gls)
- Lynn-Avon United
- Three Kings United
- Eastern Suburbs AFC
2011–2013	SC 07 Bad Neuenahr	41	(7)
2013–2015	Liverpool	6	(0)
2015	AS Elfen Saitama	1	(0)
2016-	Miramar Rangers		

International career^{‡}
2006	New Zealand U-20	11	(4)
2010–2020	New Zealand	100	(34)
- * Club domestic league appearances and goals as of 21 June 2015 ‡ National team caps and goals as of 4 March 2020

Sarah Joelle Gregorius (born 6 August 1987), is a New Zealand association football player who plays for Miramar Rangers and has represented New Zealand at international level.

== Education ==
Gregorius completed a master's degree at Massey University, with a thesis exploring cultural distance in female footballers.

== International career ==
Gregorius was a member of the New Zealand side at the 2006 FIFA U-20 Women's World Championship, playing in all three games at the finals in Russia, where they lost to Australia (0–3) and Russia (2–3), before holding Brazil to a goalless draw.

She made her senior Football Ferns debut in a 14–0 win over Vanuatu in the Oceania Women's Nations Cup on 29 September 2010. She scored her first senior international goal in her second appearance as she claimed a hat-trick in a 10–0 win over Cook Islands on 1 October 2010.

She played all New Zealand's matches at the 2011 FIFA Women's World Cup in Germany and 2015 FIFA Women's World Cup in Canada, with 6 matches overall (3 in each tournament).

Gregorius scored a goal against England in a friendly match on June 1, 2019, helping New Zealand win 1–0.

She was part of New Zealand's 2012 and 2016 Olympic teams. She also played in the 2019 FIFA Women's World Cup in France.

On 4 March 2020, Gregorius played her 100th match for New Zealand against Belgium in the 2020 Algarve Cup, when she also announced her retirement from international football.

== Club career ==
In July 2013, Gregorius signed for FA WSL league-leaders Liverpool from German Frauen-Bundesliga club SC 07 Bad Neuenahr.

== Honours ==
=== Club ===
Liverpool

- Women's Super League (1): 2013

=== Individual ===
- IFFHS OFC Woman Team of the Decade 2011–2020

== International goals ==
No.	Date	Venue	Opponent	Score	Result	Competition
1.	17 June 2012	Centre Park, Māngere, New Zealand	China	2–0	3–1	Friendly
2.	25 October 2014	Kalabond Oval, Kokopo, Papua New Guinea	Tonga	2–0	16–0	2014 OFC Women's Nations Cup
3.	25 October 2014	Kalabond Oval, Kokopo, Papua New Guinea	Tonga	7–0	16–0	2014 OFC Women's Nations Cup
4.	25 October 2014	Kalabond Oval, Kokopo, Papua New Guinea	Tonga	10–0	16–0	2014 OFC Women's Nations Cup
5.	19 November 2018	Stade Numa-Daly Magenta, Nouméa, New Caledonia	Tonga	7–0	11–0	2018 OFC Women's Nations Cup
6.	19 November 2018	Stade Numa-Daly Magenta, Nouméa, New Caledonia	Tonga	8–0	11–0	2018 OFC Women's Nations Cup
7.	19 November 2018	Stade Numa-Daly Magenta, Nouméa, New Caledonia	Tonga	9–0	11–0	2018 OFC Women's Nations Cup
8.	25 November 2018	Stade Numa-Daly Magenta, Nouméa, New Caledonia	Fiji	2–0	10–0	2018 OFC Women's Nations Cup
9.	25 November 2018	Stade Numa-Daly Magenta, Nouméa, New Caledonia	Fiji	3–0	10–0	2018 OFC Women's Nations Cup
10.	25 November 2018	Stade Numa-Daly Magenta, Nouméa, New Caledonia	Fiji	10–0	10–0	2018 OFC Women's Nations Cup
11.	1 December 2018	Stade Numa-Daly Magenta, Nouméa, New Caledonia	Fiji	2–0	8–0	2018 OFC Women's Nations Cup
12.	1 December 2018	Stade Numa-Daly Magenta, Nouméa, New Caledonia	Fiji	7–0	8–0	2018 OFC Women's Nations Cup
