= List of American Samoa women's international footballers =

Women's national football team representing the nation of American Samoa

The American Samoa women's national football team represents the country of American Samoa in women's international association football. It is fielded by Football Federation American Samoa, the governing body of football in American Samoa, and competes as a member of the Oceania Football Confederation (OFC), which encompasses the countries of Oceania. American Samoa played their first international match on 9 October 1998 in a 21–0 loss to Australia in Auckland.

American Samoa have competed in numerous competitions, and all players who have played in at least one international match, either as a member of the starting eleven or as a substitute, are listed below. Each player's details include his playing position while with the team, the number of caps earned and goals scored in all international matches, and details of the first and most recent matches played in. The names are initially ordered by number of caps (in descending order), then by date of debut, then by alphabetical order. All statistics are correct up to and including the match played on 15 July 2019.

== Key ==
Positions key
GK	Goalkeeper
DF	Defender
MF	Midfielder
FW	Forward

Position
Playing positions are listed according to the tactical formations that were employed at the time.
Caps and goals
Caps and goals comprise those in the FIFA Women's World Cup and OFC Women's Nations Cup, their associated qualification matches, as well as Pacific Games matches.

== Players ==
American Samoa national team football players
Player	Pos.	Caps	Goals	Debut		Last or most recent match	
Player	Pos.	Caps	Goals	Date	Opponent	Date	Opponent
Lela Waetin		8	0	29 August 2011	Papua New Guinea	15 July 2019	Tonga
Alma Mana'o		7	0	29 August 2011	Papua New Guinea	30 August 2018	Fiji
Saono Enesi		7	0	24 August 2018	Solomon Islands	15 July 2019	Tonga
Elcy Lui		7	0	24 August 2018	Solomon Islands	15 July 2019	Tonga
Ava Mana'o		6	0	29 August 2011	Papua New Guinea	30 August 2018	Fiji
Aggie Pati		5	0	30 August 2018	Fiji	15 July 2019	Tonga
Momi Ene		4	0	25 August 2007	Papua New Guinea	1 September 2007	Solomon Islands
Sandra Herrera		4	0	25 August 2007	Papua New Guinea	1 September 2007	Solomon Islands
Filiga Kerisiano		4	0	25 August 2007	Papua New Guinea	1 September 2007	Solomon Islands
Lelamay Kerisiano		4	0	25 August 2007	Papua New Guinea	1 September 2007	Solomon Islands
Meleane Kerisiano		4	0	25 August 2007	Papua New Guinea	1 September 2007	Solomon Islands
Fetu Lakisa		4	0	25 August 2007	Papua New Guinea	1 September 2007	Solomon Islands
Jasmine Makiasi		4	1	25 August 2007	Papua New Guinea	1 September 2007	Solomon Islands
Tofaagaolii Oloaluga		4	0	25 August 2007	Papua New Guinea	1 September 2007	Solomon Islands
Angela Sao		4	0	25 August 2007	Papua New Guinea	1 September 2007	Solomon Islands
Meleane Ioapo		4	0	29 August 2011	Papua New Guinea	5 September 2011	Tahiti
Tuiemanu Ripley		4	0	29 August 2011	Papua New Guinea	5 September 2011	Tahiti
Nikki Tolmie		4	0	29 August 2011	Papua New Guinea	5 September 2011	Tahiti
Eseta Enesi		4	0	8 July 2019	Fiji	15 July 2019	Tonga
Rayxena Foma'i		4	0	8 July 2019	Fiji	15 July 2019	Tonga
Precious Ieremia		4	0	8 July 2019	Fiji	15 July 2019	Tonga
Susanna Lutali		4	0	8 July 2019	Fiji	15 July 2019	Tonga
Olivia Vaiomounga		4	0	8 July 2019	Fiji	15 July 2019	Tonga
Ivette Herrera		3	0	25 August 2007	Papua New Guinea	1 September 2007	Solomon Islands
Beulah Oney		3	0	25 August 2007	Papua New Guinea	1 September 2007	Solomon Islands
Maria Sefo		3	0	28 August 2007	Cook Islands	1 September 2007	Solomon Islands
Fiso Letoi		3	0	29 August 2011	Papua New Guinea	5 September 2011	Tahiti
Fuatains Siatuu		3	0	29 August 2011	Papua New Guinea	2 September 2011	Solomon Islands
Sancia Sopoaga		3	0	29 August 2011	Papua New Guinea	5 September 2011	Tahiti
Trixie Mavae		3	0	31 August 2011	New Caledonia	5 September 2011	Tahiti
Moaga Siaulaiga		3	0	31 August 2011	New Caledonia	5 September 2011	Tahiti
Ashley Hall		3	0	24 August 2018	Solomon Islands	30 August 2018	Fiji
Malia Ili		3	0	24 August 2018	Solomon Islands	30 August 2018	Fiji
Tasha Inong		3	0	24 August 2018	Solomon Islands	30 August 2018	Fiji
Haleigh Mana'o		3	0	24 August 2018	Solomon Islands	30 August 2018	Fiji
Severina Mana'o		3	0	24 August 2018	Solomon Islands	30 August 2018	Fiji
Gizel Pene		3	0	24 August 2018	Solomon Islands	30 August 2018	Fiji
Manaia Siania-Unutoa		3	0	24 August 2018	Solomon Islands	30 August 2018	Fiji
Eliza Berondo		3	0	8 July 2019	Fiji	15 July 2019	Tonga
Beulah Oney		3	0	8 July 2019	Fiji	15 July 2019	Tonga
Pule Sagote		3	0	8 July 2019	Fiji	15 July 2019	Tonga
Ora Brown		2	0	28 August 2007	Cook Islands	1 September 2007	Solomon Islands
Lynn Tualaulelei		2	0	29 August 2011	Papua New Guinea	5 September 2011	Tahiti
Tulima Mauga		2	0	24 August 2018	Solomon Islands	30 August 2018	Fiji
Reinnette Noa		2	0	10 July 2019	Samoa	12 July 2019	New Caledonia
Jermaima Fautino		1	0	28 August 2007	Cook Islands	28 August 2007	Cook Islands
Titula Nauer		1	0	28 August 2007	Cook Islands	28 August 2007	Cook Islands
Lita Taoto		1	0	30 August 2007	Fiji	30 August 2007	Fiji
Nellie Taumanupepe		1	0	30 August 2007	Fiji	30 August 2007	Fiji
Regina Wright		1	0	30 August 2007	Fiji	30 August 2007	Fiji
Marleen Siligi		1	0	1 September 2007	Solomon Islands	1 September 2007	Solomon Islands
Filiga Ioapo		1	0	29 August 2011	Papua New Guinea	29 August 2011	Papua New Guinea
Fiapa'ipa'i Siatu'u		1	0	2 September 2011	Solomon Islands	2 September 2011	Solomon Islands
Kristina Vaeao		1	0	2 September 2011	Solomon Islands	2 September 2011	Solomon Islands
Fuataina Siatu'u		1	0	5 September 2011	Tahiti	5 September 2011	Tahiti
Louisa Mavaega		1	0	30 August 2018	Fiji	30 August 2018	Fiji
Ama Faleao		1	0	8 July 2019	Fiji	8 July 2019	Fiji
Agnes Siaosi		1	0	8 July 2019	Fiji	8 July 2019	Fiji
Princess Fegauia'i		1	0	8 July 2019	Fiji	8 July 2019	Fiji
Zepora Talo		1	0	8 July 2019	Fiji	8 July 2019	Fiji
Veronica Iupati		1	0	8 July 2019	Fiji	8 July 2019	Fiji
