= FIFA Women's World Cup records and statistics =

Records of the FIFA Women's World Cup

This is a list of the records of the FIFA Women's World Cup.

== General statistics by tournament ==
Year	Hosts	Champions	Winning coach	Winning captain(s)	Top scorer(s)	Best player award
1991	China	United States	(United States) Anson Dorrance	(United States) April Heinrichs	(United States) Michelle Akers (10)	(United States) Carin Jennings
1995	Sweden	Norway	(Norway) Even Pellerud	(Norway) Heidi Støre	(Norway) Ann-Kristin Aarønes (6)	(Norway) Hege Riise
1999	United States	United States	(United States) Tony DiCicco	(United States) Carla Overbeck	(Brazil) Sissi (7) (China) Sun Wen (7)	(China) Sun Wen
2003	United States	Germany	(Germany) Tina Theune	(Germany) Bettina Wiegmann	(Germany) Birgit Prinz (7)	(Germany) Birgit Prinz
2007	China	Germany	(Germany) Silvia Neid	(Germany) Birgit Prinz	(Brazil) Marta (7)	(Brazil) Marta
2011	Germany	Japan	(Japan) Norio Sasaki	(Japan) Homare Sawa	(Japan) Homare Sawa (5)	(Japan) Homare Sawa
2015	Canada	United States	(United States) Jill Ellis	(United States) Christie Rampone	(Germany) Célia Šašić (6) (United States) Carli Lloyd (6)	(United States) Carli Lloyd
2019	France	United States	(United States) Jill Ellis	(United States) Carli Lloyd (United States) Alex Morgan (United States) Megan Rapinoe	(United States) Megan Rapinoe (6) (United States) Alex Morgan (6) (England) Ellen White (6)	(United States) Megan Rapinoe
2023	Australia; New Zealand	Spain	(Spain) Jorge Vilda	(Spain) Ivana Andrés	(Japan) Hinata Miyazawa (5)	(Spain) Aitana Bonmatí
2027	Brazil	TBD	TBD	TBD	TBD	TBD
2031	Costa Rica; Jamaica; Mexico; United States	TBD	TBD	TBD	TBD	TBD
2035	England; Northern Ireland; Scotland; Wales	TBD	TBD	TBD	TBD	TBD

== Debut of national teams ==
Year	Debuting teams		
Year	Teams	No.	Cum.
1991	Brazil, China, Chinese Taipei, Denmark, Germany, Italy, Japan, New Zealand, Nigeria, Norway, Sweden, United States	12	12
1995	Australia, Canada, England	3	15
1999	Ghana, Mexico, North Korea, Russia	4	19
2003	Argentina, France, South Korea	3	22
2007	None	0	22
2011	Colombia, Equatorial Guinea	2	24
2015	Cameroon, Costa Rica, Ecuador, Ivory Coast, Netherlands, Spain, Switzerland, Thailand	8	32
2019	Chile, Jamaica, Scotland, South Africa	4	36
2023	Haiti, Morocco, Panama, Philippines, Portugal, Republic of Ireland, Vietnam, Zambia	8	44
2027	Algeria, Malawi	2	46

== Overall team records ==
In this ranking 3 points are awarded for a win, 1 for a draw and 0 for a loss. As per statistical convention in football, matches decided in extra time are counted as wins and losses, while matches decided by penalty shoot-outs are counted as draws. Teams are ranked by total points, then by goal difference, then by goals scored.

As of 2023 FIFA Women's World Cup

Rank	Team	Part	Pld	W	D	L	GF	GA	GD	Pts
1	United States	9	54	41	9	4	142	39	+103	132
2	Germany	10	47	31	6	10	129	42	+87	99
3	Sweden	9	47	28	6	13	85	52	+33	90
4	Norway	9	44	25	5	14	100	56	+44	80
5	Brazil	10	37	21	5	11	71	42	+29	68
6	England	6	33	20	5	8	56	34	+22	65
7	China	9	36	17	7	12	55	39	+16	58
8	Japan	10	38	18	4	16	54	62	–8	58
9	France	6	24	13	5	6	44	24	+20	44
10	Australia	9	33	10	7	16	48	58	–10	37
11	Canada	8	30	9	6	15	36	57	–21	33
12	Netherlands	3	16	10	2	4	26	12	+14	32
13	Spain	4	14	7	2	5	24	15	+9	23
14	Italy	4	15	7	1	7	23	20	+3	22
15	Nigeria	9	30	5	6	19	23	65	–42	21
16	Denmark	6	18	5	1	12	22	29	–7	16
17	Colombia	4	12	4	2	6	10	13	–3	14
18	Russia	2	8	4	0	4	16	14	+2	12
19	North Korea	5	13	3	2	8	12	20	–8	11
20	Cameroon	3	8	3	0	5	12	12	0	9
21	Switzerland	2	8	2	2	4	14	10	+4	8
22	New Zealand	7	18	1	4	13	9	35	–26	7
23	Morocco	1	4	2	0	2	2	10	–8	6
24	Jamaica	2	7	1	2	4	2	13	–11	5
25	South Korea	5	13	1	2	10	7	31	–24	5
26	Portugal	1	3	1	1	1	2	1	+1	4
27	South Africa	2	7	1	1	5	7	16	–9	4
28	Ghana	3	9	1	1	7	6	30	–24	4
29	Chile	1	3	1	0	2	2	5	–3	3
30	Philippines	2	3	1	0	2	1	8	–7	3
31	Zambia	1	3	1	0	2	3	11	–8	3
32	Chinese Taipei	1	4	1	0	3	2	15	–13	3
33	Mexico	3	9	0	3	6	6	30	–24	3
34	Thailand	2	6	1	0	5	4	30	–26	3
35	Argentina	5	12	0	3	9	7	42	–35	3
36	Costa Rica	2	6	0	2	4	4	12	–8	2
37	Scotland	1	3	0	1	2	5	7	–2	1
38	Ireland	1	3	0	1	2	1	3	–2	1
39	Haiti	1	3	0	0	3	0	4	–4	0
40	Equatorial Guinea	1	3	0	0	3	2	7	–5	0
41	Panama	1	3	0	0	3	3	11	–8	0
42	Vietnam	1	3	0	0	3	0	12	–12	0
43	Ivory Coast	1	3	0	0	3	3	16	–13	0
44	Ecuador	1	3	0	0	3	1	17	–16	0

== Medal table ==
Rank	Nation	Gold	Silver	Bronze	Total
1	United States	4	1	3	8
2	Germany	2	1	0	3
3	Japan	1	1	0	2
3	Norway	1	1	0	2
5	Spain	1	0	0	1
6	Sweden	0	1	4	5
7	Brazil	0	1	1	2
7	England	0	1	1	2
9	China	0	1	0	1
9	Netherlands	0	1	0	1
Totals (10 entries)		9	9	9	27

== Comprehensive team results by tournament ==
Legend

- 1st – Champions
- 2nd – Runners-up
- 3rd – Third place
- 4th – Fourth place
- QF – Quarter-finals
- R2 – Round 2 (2015–present: knockout round of 16)
- R1 – Round 1 (1991–present: group stage)
- • – Did not qualify
- •• – Qualified but withdrew
- •× – Withdrew during qualification / Disqualified during qualification (after playing matches)
- × – Did not enter / Banned
- – Hosts
- Q – Qualified for forthcoming tournament

For each tournament, the number of teams in each finals tournament are shown (in parentheses).

Team	1991 (China) (12)	1995 (Sweden) (12)	1999 (United States) (16)	2003 (United States) (16)	2007 (China) (16)	2011 (Germany) (16)	2015 (Canada) (24)	2019 (France) (24)	2023 (Australia) (New Zealand) (32)	2027 (Brazil) (32)	2031 (Costa Rica) (Jamaica) (Mexico) (United States) (48)	2035 (England) (Northern Ireland) (Scotland) (Wales) (48)	Total
Algeria	×	×	×	×	•	•	•	•	•	Q			1
Argentina	×	•	•	R1; 16th	R1; 16th	•	•	R1; 18th	R1; 27th	Q			5
Australia	•	R1; 12th	R1; 11th	R1; 13th	QF; 6th	QF; 8th	QF; 7th	R2; 9th	4th	Q			9
Brazil	R1; 9th	R1; 9th	3rd	QF; 5th	2nd	QF; 5th	R2; 9th	R2; 10th	R1; 18th	Q			10
Cameroon	•	×	•	•	•	•	R2; 11th	R2; 15th	•	Q			3
Canada	•	R1; 10th	R1; 12th	4th	R1; 9th	R1; 16th	QF; 6th	R2; 11th	R1; 21st				8
Chile	•	•	•	•	•	•	•	R1; 17th	•	•			1
China	QF; 5th	4th	2nd	QF; 6th	QF; 5th	•	QF; 8th	R2; 14th	R1; 23rd	Q			9
Chinese Taipei	QF; 8th	•	•	•	•	•	•	•	•				1
Colombia	×	×	•	•	•	R1; 14th	R2; 12th	•	QF; 8th	Q			4
Costa Rica	•	×	•	•	•	•	R1; 18th	•	R1; 30th		Q		3
Denmark	QF; 7th	QF; 7th	R1; 15th	•	R1; 12th	•	•	•	R2; 11th	Q			6
Ecuador	×	•	•	•	•	•	R1; 24th	•	•				1
England	•	QF; 6th	•	•	QF; 7th	QF; 7th	3rd	4th	2nd			Q	6
Equatorial Guinea	×	×	×	•	•	R1; 15th	•	×	•	•			1
France	•	•	•	R1; 9th	•	4th	QF; 5th	QF; 6th	QF; 6th	Q			6
Germany	4th	2nd	QF; 8th	1st	1st	QF; 6th	4th	QF; 5th	R1; 17th	Q			10
Ghana	•	•	R1; T-13th	R1; 12th	R1; 15th	•	•	•	•				3
Haiti	•	×	•	•	•	•	•	•	R1; 29th				1
Italy	QF; 6th	•	R1; 9th	•	•	•	•	QF; 7th	R1; 22nd				4
Ivory Coast	×	×	×	•	•	•	R1; 23rd	•	•	•			1
Jamaica	•	•	×	•	•	×	•	R1; 23rd	R2; 13th		Q		3
Japan	R1; 12th	QF; 8th	R1; T-13th	R1; 10th	R1; T-10th	1st	2nd	R2; 13th	QF; 5th	Q			10
Malawi	×	×	×	×	•	×	×	×	•	Q			1
Mexico	•	•	R1; 16th	•	•	R1; 11th	R1; 22nd	•	•		Q		4
Morocco	×	×	•	•	•	•	•	•	R2; 12th	Q			2
Netherlands	•	•	•	•	•	•	R2; 13th	2nd	QF; 7th				3
Northern Ireland	•	×	×	×	•	•	•	•	•	•		Q	1
New Zealand	R1; 11th	•	•	•	R1; 14th	R1; 12th	R1; 19th	R1; 20th	R1; 20th	Q			7
Nigeria	R1; 10th	R1; 11th	QF; 7th	R1; 15th	R1; 13th	R1; 9th	R1; 21st	R2; 16th	R2; 10th	•			9
North Korea	•	×	R1; 10th	R1; 11th	QF; 8th	R1; 13th	×	•	×	Q			5
Norway	2nd	1st	4th	QF; 7th	4th	R1; 10th	R2; 10th	QF; 8th	R2; 15th				9
Panama	×	×	×	•	•	×	•	•	R1; 31st				1
Philippines	×	•	•	•	•	×	•	•	R1; 24th	Q			2
Portugal	×	•	•	•	•	•	•	•	R1; 19th				1
Republic of Ireland	•	×	•	•	•	•	•	•	R1; 26th				1
Russia	×	•	QF; 5th	QF; 8th	•	•	•	•	•×	×			2
Scotland	×	•	•	•	•	•	•	R1; 19th	•			Q	2
South Africa	×	•	•	•	•	•	•	R1; 22nd	R2; 16th				2
South Korea	•	•	•	R1; 14th	•	•	R2; 14th	R1; 21st	R1; 28th	Q			5
Spain	•	•	•	•	•	•	R1; 20th	R2; 12th	1st	Q			4
Sweden	3rd	QF; 5th	QF; 6th	2nd	R1; T-10th	3rd	R2; 16th	3rd	3rd				9
Switzerland	•	•	•	•	•	•	R2; 15th	•	R2; 14th				2
Thailand	•	×	×	•	•	•	R1; 17th	R1; 24th	•	•			2
United States	1st	3rd	1st	3rd	3rd	2nd	1st	1st	R2; 9th		Q		10
Vietnam	×	×	×	•	•	•	•	•	R1; 32nd	•			1
Wales	×	•	•	•	•	•	•	•	•	•		Q	1
Zambia	×	•	×	•	•	×	•	•	R1; 25th	•			1
Team	1991 (China) (12)	1995 (Sweden) (12)	1999 (United States) (16)	2003 (United States) (16)	2007 (China) (16)	2011 (Germany) (16)	2015 (Canada) (24)	2019 (France) (24)	2023 (Australia) (New Zealand) (32)	2027 (Brazil) (32)	2031 (Costa Rica) (Jamaica) (Mexico) (United States) (48)	2035 (England) (Northern Ireland) (Scotland) (Wales) (48)	Total

== Hosts ==
Host nations are granted an automatic spot in the World Cup group stage.

Results of host nations
Year	Host nation	Finish
1991	China	Quarter-finals
1995	Sweden	Quarter-finals
1999	United States	Champions
2003	United States	Third place
2007	China	Quarter-finals
2011	Germany	Quarter-finals
2015	Canada	Quarter-finals
2019	France	Quarter-finals
2023	Australia	Fourth place
2023	New Zealand	Group stage
2027	Brazil	TBD
2031	Costa Rica	TBD
2031	Jamaica	TBD
2031	Mexico	TBD
2031	United States	TBD
2035	England	TBD
2035	Northern Ireland	TBD
2035	Scotland	TBD
2035	Wales	TBD

== Results of defending finalists ==
Year	Defending champions	Finish	Defending runners-up	Finish
1995	United States	Third place	Norway	Champions
1999	Norway	Fourth place	Germany	Quarter-finals
2003	United States	Third place	China	Quarter-finals
2007	Germany	Champions	Sweden	Group stage
2011	Germany	Quarter-finals	Brazil	Quarter-finals
2015	Japan	Runners-up	United States	Champions
2019	United States	Champions	Japan	Round of 16
2023	United States	Round of 16	Netherlands	Quarter-finals
2027	Spain	TBD	England	TBD

== Results by confederation ==
— Hosts are from this confederation

=== Overview ===
Confederation	1st	2nd	3rd	4th	Top 8	Top 16
UEFA	4	5	5	6	40	23
CONCACAF	4	1	3	1	10	6
AFC	1	2	0	2	16	9
CONMEBOL	0	1	1	0	5	4
CAF	0	0	0	0	1	6
OFC	0	0	0	0	0	0

=== AFC ===
	1991 (China) (12)	1995 (Sweden) (12)	1999 (United States) (16)	2003 (United States) (16)	2007 (China) (16)	2011 (Germany) (16)	2015 (Canada) (24)	2019 (France) (24)	2023 (Australia) (New Zealand) (32)	2027 (Brazil) (32)	2031 (Costa Rica) (Jamaica) (Mexico) (United States) (48)	2035 (England) (Northern Ireland) (Scotland) (Wales) (48)	Total
Teams	3	2	3	4	4	3	5	5	6	6			41
Top 16	—	—	—	—	—	—	4	3	2				9
Top 8	2	2	1	1	3	2	3	0	2				16
Top 4	0	1	1	0	0	1	1	0	1				5
Top 2	0	0	1	0	0	1	1	0	0				3
1st						(Japan)							1
2nd			(China)				(Japan)						2
3rd													0
4th		(China)							(Australia)				2

=== CAF ===
	1991 (China) (12)	1995 (Sweden) (12)	1999 (United States) (16)	2003 (United States) (16)	2007 (China) (16)	2011 (Germany) (16)	2015 (Canada) (24)	2019 (France) (24)	2023 (Australia) (New Zealand) (32)	2027 (Brazil) (32)	2031 (Costa Rica) (Jamaica) (Mexico) (United States) (48)	2035 (England) (Northern Ireland) (Scotland) (Wales) (48)	Total
Teams	1	1	2	2	2	2	3	3	4	4			24
Top 16	—	—	—	—	—	—	1	2	3				6
Top 8	0	0	1	0	0	0	0	0	0				1
Top 4	0	0	0	0	0	0	0	0	0				0
Top 2	0	0	0	0	0	0	0	0	0				0
1st													0
2nd													0
3rd													0
4th													0

=== CONCACAF ===
	1991 (China) (12)	1995 (Sweden) (12)	1999 (United States) (16)	2003 (United States) (16)	2007 (China) (16)	2011 (Germany) (16)	2015 (Canada) (24)	2019 (France) (24)	2023 (Australia) (New Zealand) (32)	2027 (Brazil) (32)	2031 (Costa Rica) (Jamaica) (Mexico) (United States) (48)	2035 (England) (Northern Ireland) (Scotland) (Wales) (48)	Total
Teams	1	2	3	2	2	3	4	3	6	4			32
Top 16	—	—	—	—	—	—	2	2	2				6
Top 8	1	1	1	2	1	1	2	1	0				10
Top 4	1	1	1	2	1	1	1	1	0				9
Top 2	1	0	1	0	0	1	1	1	0				5
1st	(United States)		(United States)				(United States)	(United States)					4
2nd						(United States)							1
3rd		(United States)		(United States)	(United States)								3
4th				(Canada)									1

=== CONMEBOL ===
	1991 (China) (12)	1995 (Sweden) (12)	1999 (United States) (16)	2003 (United States) (16)	2007 (China) (16)	2011 (Germany) (16)	2015 (Canada) (24)	2019 (France) (24)	2023 (Australia) (New Zealand) (32)	2027 (Brazil) (32)	2031 (Costa Rica) (Jamaica) (Mexico) (United States) (48)	2035 (England) (Northern Ireland) (Scotland) (Wales) (48)	Total
Teams	1	1	1	2	2	2	3	3	3	3			21
Top 16	—	—	—	—	—	—	2	1	1				4
Top 8	0	0	1	1	1	1	0	0	1				5
Top 4	0	0	1	0	1	0	0	0	0				2
Top 2	0	0	0	0	1	0	0	0	0				1
1st													0
2nd					(Brazil)								1
3rd			(Brazil)										1
4th													0

=== OFC ===
	1991 (China) (12)	1995 (Sweden) (12)	1999 (United States) (16)	2003 (United States) (16)	2007 (China) (16)	2011 (Germany) (16)	2015 (Canada) (24)	2019 (France) (24)	2023 (Australia) (New Zealand) (32)	2027 (Brazil) (32)	2031 (Costa Rica) (Jamaica) (Mexico) (United States) (48)	2035 (England) (Northern Ireland) (Scotland) (Wales) (48)	Total
Teams	1	1	1	1	1	1	1	1	1	1			10
Top 16	—	—	—	—	—	—	0	0	0				0
Top 8	0	0	0	0	0	0	0	0	0				0
Top 4	0	0	0	0	0	0	0	0	0				0
Top 2	0	0	0	0	0	0	0	0	0				0
1st													0
2nd													0
3rd													0
4th													0

=== UEFA ===
	1991 (China) (12)	1995 (Sweden) (12)	1999 (United States) (16)	2003 (United States) (16)	2007 (China) (16)	2011 (Germany) (16)	2015 (Canada) (24)	2019 (France) (24)	2023 (Australia) (New Zealand) (32)	2027 (Brazil) (32)	2031 (Costa Rica) (Jamaica) (Mexico) (United States) (48)	2035 (England) (Northern Ireland) (Scotland) (Wales) (48)	Total
Teams	5	5	6	5	5	5	8	9	12	11			71
Top 16	—	—	—	—	—	—	7	8	8				23
Top 8	5	5	4	4	3	4	3	7	5				40
Top 4	3	2	1	2	2	2	2	3	3				20
Top 2	1	2	0	2	1	0	0	1	2				9
1st		(Norway)		(Germany)	(Germany)				(Spain)				4
2nd	(Norway)	(Germany)		(Sweden)				(Netherlands)	(England)				5
3rd	(Sweden)					(Sweden)	(England)	(Sweden)	(Sweden)				5
4th	(Germany)		(Norway)		(Norway)	(France)	(Germany)	(England)					6

== Droughts ==
This section is a list of droughts associated with the participation of women's national football teams in the FIFA Women's World Cups.

=== Longest active World Cup appearance droughts ===
Does not include teams that have not yet made their first appearance or teams that no longer exist.

Team	Last appearance	WC missed
Chinese Taipei	1991	8
Russia	2003	6
Ghana	2007	4
Equatorial Guinea	2011	4
Ecuador	2015	2
Ivory Coast	2015	3
Mexico	2015	2
Chile	2019	2
Thailand	2019	2
Scotland	2019	1
Nigeria	2023	1
Vietnam	2023	1
Zambia	2023	1

=== Longest World Cup appearance droughts overall ===
Only includes droughts begun after a team's first appearance and until the team ceased to exist; updated to include qualification for the 2027 FIFA Women's World Cup.

Team	Prev. appearance	Next appearance	WC missed
Chinese Taipei	1991	active	8
Russia	2003	active	6
Italy	1999	2019	4
Ghana	2007	active	4
New Zealand	1991	2007	3
Denmark	2007	2023	3
Equatorial Guinea	2011	active	3
North Korea	2011	2027	3
Argentina	2007	2019	2
South Korea	2003	2015	2
Mexico	1999	2011	2
Mexico	2015	active	2
England	1995	2007	2
Ecuador	2015	active	2
Ivory Coast	2015	active	3
Chile	2019	active	2
Thailand	2019	active	2
China	2007	2015	1
France	2003	2011	1
Colombia	2015	2023	1
Costa Rica	2015	2023	1
Switzerland	2015	2023	1
Cameroon	2019	2027	1
Scotland	2019	active	1
Nigeria	2023	active	1
Vietnam	2023	active	1
Zambia	2023	active	1

== Teams: tournament position ==
Teams having equal quantities in the tables below are ordered by the tournament the quantity was attained in (the teams that attained the quantity first are listed first). If the quantity was attained by more than one team in the same tournament, these teams are ordered alphabetically.

Most titles won
4: United States (1991, 1999, 2015, 2019).
Most finishes in the top two
5: United States (1991, 1999, 2011, 2015, 2019).
Most finishes in the top three
8: United States (1991–2019).
Most finishes in the top four
8: United States (1991–2019).
Most finishes in the top eight
8: Germany, United States (1991–2019).
Most World Cup appearances
9: Brazil, Germany, Japan, Nigeria, Norway, Sweden, United States (every tournament).
Most second-place finishes
1: Norway (1991), Germany (1995), China (1999), Sweden (2003), Brazil (2007), United States (2011), Japan (2015), Netherlands (2019), England (2023).
Most third-place finishes
4: Sweden (1991, 2011, 2019, 2023).
Most fourth-place finishes
2: Germany (1991, 2015), Norway (1999, 2007).
Most 3rd-4th-place finishes
4: Sweden (1991, 2011, 2019, 2023).
Most 5th-8th-place finishes
4: China (1991, 2003, 2007, 2015).
Most 9th-16th-place finishes
7: Nigeria (1991, 1995, 2003, 2007, 2011, 2019, 2023).

=== Consecutive ===
Most consecutive championships
2: Germany (2003–2007), United States (2015–2019).
Most consecutive finishes in the top two
3: United States (2011–2019).
Most consecutive finishes in the top three
8: United States (1991–2019).
Most consecutive finishes in the top four
8: United States (1991–2019).
Most consecutive finishes in the top eight
8: Germany, United States (1991–2019).
Most consecutive appearances in the finals
10: Brazil, Germany, Japan (1991–2027).
Most consecutive championships by a confederation
2: UEFA (2003–2007), CONCACAF (2015–2019).

=== Gaps ===
Longest gap between successive titles
16 years: United States (1999–2015).
Longest gap between successive appearances in the top two
12 years: United States (1999–2011).
Longest gap between successive appearances in the top three
12 years: Sweden (1991–2003).
Longest gap between successive appearances in the top four
12 years: Sweden (1991–2003).
Longest gap between successive appearances in the top eight
28 years: Italy (1991–2019).
Longest gap between successive appearances in the finals
20 years: Italy (1999–2019).

=== Host team ===
Best finish by host team
Champion: United States (1999).
Worst finish by host team
Group Stage: New Zealand (2023).

=== Defending champion ===
Best finish by defending champion
Champion: Germany (2007), United States (2019).
Worst finish by defending champion
Round of 16: United States (2023).

=== Debuting teams ===
Best finish by a debuting team
Champion: United States (1991).
Best finish by a debuting team, excluding inaugural tournament
Quarterfinals: England (1995), Russia (1999)

=== Other ===
Most finishes in the top two without ever being champion
1: China (1999), Sweden (2003), Brazil (2007), Netherlands (2019), England (2023).
Most finishes in the top three without ever being champion
5: Sweden (1991, 2003, 2011, 2019, 2023).
Most finishes in the top four without ever being champion
5: Sweden (1991, 2003, 2011, 2019, 2023).
Most finishes in the top eight without ever being champion
7: Sweden (1991–2003, 2011, 2019, 2023).
Most appearances without ever being champion
9: Brazil, Nigeria, Sweden (every tournament).
Most finishes in the top four without ever finishing in the top two
1: Canada (2003), France (2011), Australia (2023).
Most finishes in the top eight without ever finishing in the top two
4: Australia (2007–2015, 2023), France (2011–2023).
Most appearances without ever finishing in the top two
9: Nigeria (every tournament).
Most finishes in the top eight without ever finishing in the top four
2: Denmark (1991–1995), Russia (1999–2003), Italy (1991, 2019).
Most appearances without ever finishing in the top four
9: Nigeria (every tournament).
Most appearances without ever finishing in the top eight
6: New Zealand (1991, 2007–2023).
Teams that defeated tournament champion
England, 2011 (2–0 vs Japan); Japan, 2023 (4–0 vs Spain).
Most played final
2: Japan vs United States (2011–2015).

== Players: tournament position ==
Qualification: at least one appearance in each Finals tournament.

=== Most finishes in the top two ===
Player	Nation	Tournament	Apps	Games	Apps	Games	App %
Sandra Minnert	Germany	1995	2	6	11	18	61
Sandra Minnert	Germany	2003	6	6	11	18	61
Sandra Minnert	Germany	2007	3	6	11	18	61
Birgit Prinz	Germany	1995	6	6	18	18	100
Birgit Prinz	Germany	2003	6	6	18	18	100
Birgit Prinz	Germany	2007	6	6	18	18	100
Sandra Smisek	Germany	1995	1	6	8	18	44
Sandra Smisek	Germany	2003	1	6	8	18	44
Sandra Smisek	Germany	2007	6	6	8	18	44
Christie Rampone	United States	1999	1	6	9	19	47
Christie Rampone	United States	2011	6	6	9	19	47
Christie Rampone	United States	2015	2	7	9	19	47
Tobin Heath	United States	2011	4	6	14	20	70
Tobin Heath	United States	2015	6	7	14	20	70
Tobin Heath	United States	2019	6	7	14	20	70
Ali Krieger	United States	2011	6	6	16	20	80
Ali Krieger	United States	2015	7	7	16	20	80
Ali Krieger	United States	2019	3	7	16	20	80
Carli Lloyd	United States	2011	6	6	20	20	100
Carli Lloyd	United States	2015	7	7	20	20	100
Carli Lloyd	United States	2019	7	7	20	20	100
Alex Morgan	United States	2011	5	6	18	20	90
Alex Morgan	United States	2015	7	7	18	20	90
Alex Morgan	United States	2019	6	7	18	20	90
Kelley O'Hara	United States	2011	1	6	10	20	80
Kelley O'Hara	United States	2015	3	7	10	20	80
Kelley O'Hara	United States	2019	6	7	10	20	80
Megan Rapinoe	United States	2011	6	6	17	20	85
Megan Rapinoe	United States	2015	6	7	17	20	85
Megan Rapinoe	United States	2019	5	7	17	20	85
Becky Sauerbrunn	United States	2011	1	6	14	20	70
Becky Sauerbrunn	United States	2015	7	7	14	20	70
Becky Sauerbrunn	United States	2019	6	7	14	20	70

=== Most finishes in the top three ===
Player	Nation	Tournament	Apps	Games	Apps	Games	App %
Kristine Lilly	United States	1991	6	6	30	30	100
Kristine Lilly	United States	1995	6	6	30	30	100
Kristine Lilly	United States	1999	6	6	30	30	100
Kristine Lilly	United States	2003	6	6	30	30	100
Kristine Lilly	United States	2007	6	6	30	30	100
Christie Rampone	United States	1999	1	6	19	31	61
Christie Rampone	United States	2003	4	6	19	31	61
Christie Rampone	United States	2007	6	6	19	31	61
Christie Rampone	United States	2011	6	6	19	31	61
Christie Rampone	United States	2015	2	7	19	31	61

=== Most finishes in the top four ===
Player	Nation	Tournament	Apps	Games	Apps	Games	App %
Kristine Lilly	United States	1991	6	6	30	30	100
Kristine Lilly	United States	1995	6	6	30	30	100
Kristine Lilly	United States	1999	6	6	30	30	100
Kristine Lilly	United States	2003	6	6	30	30	100
Kristine Lilly	United States	2007	6	6	30	30	100
Christie Rampone	United States	1999	1	6	19	31	61
Christie Rampone	United States	2003	4	6	19	31	61
Christie Rampone	United States	2007	6	6	19	31	61
Christie Rampone	United States	2011	6	6	19	31	61
Christie Rampone	United States	2015	2	7	19	31	61

=== Most finishes in the top eight ===
Player	Nation	Tournament	Apps	Games	Apps	Games	App %
Kristine Lilly	United States	1991	6	6	30	30	100
Kristine Lilly	United States	1995	6	6	30	30	100
Kristine Lilly	United States	1999	6	6	30	30	100
Kristine Lilly	United States	2003	6	6	30	30	100
Kristine Lilly	United States	2007	6	6	30	30	100
Birgit Prinz	Germany	1995	6	6	24	26	92
Birgit Prinz	Germany	1999	4	4	24	26	92
Birgit Prinz	Germany	2003	6	6	24	26	92
Birgit Prinz	Germany	2007	6	6	24	26	92
Birgit Prinz	Germany	2011	2	4	24	26	92
Christie Rampone	United States	1999	1	6	19	31	61
Christie Rampone	United States	2003	4	6	19	31	61
Christie Rampone	United States	2007	6	6	19	31	61
Christie Rampone	United States	2011	6	6	19	31	61
Christie Rampone	United States	2015	2	7	19	31	61

== Coaches: tournament position ==
Most championships
2: Jill Ellis (United States, 2015–2019).
Most finishes in the top two
2: Even Pellerud (Norway, 1991–1995), Norio Sasaki (Japan, 2011–2015), Jill Ellis (United States, 2015–2019), Sarina Wiegman (Netherlands, 2019; England, 2023).
Most finishes in the top three
2: Even Pellerud (Norway, 1991–1995), Tony DiCicco (United States, 1995–1999), Norio Sasaki (Japan, 2011–2015), Jill Ellis (United States, 2015–2019), Sarina Wiegman (Netherlands, 2019; England, 2023).
Most finishes in the top four
3: Even Pellerud (Norway, 1991–1995; Canada, 2003)

== Teams: matches played and goals scored ==
=== All time ===
Most matches played
53: United States.
Most wins
41: United States.
Fewest wins
0: Argentina, Costa Rica, Ecuador, Equatorial Guinea, Haiti, Republic of Ireland, Ivory Coast, Mexico, Panama, Scotland, Vietnam.
Most losses
19: Nigeria.
Fewest losses
1: Portugal.
Most draws
9: United States.
Fewest draws
0: Cameroon, Chile, Chinese Taipei, Ecuador, Equatorial Guinea, Haiti, Ivory Coast, Morocco, Panama, Philippines, Russia, Thailand, Vietnam, Zambia.
Most matches played without a win or a draw
3: Equatorial Guinea, Ecuador, Haiti, Ivory Coast, Panama, Vietnam.
Most matches played without a win
12: Argentina.
Most matches played until first win
15: New Zealand.
Most matches played until first draw
17: Norway.
Most matches played until first loss
10: United States.
Most goals scored
142: United States.
Most hat-tricks scored
5: Germany.
Most goals conceded
65: Nigeria.
Most hat-tricks conceded
4: Mexico.
Fewest goals scored
0: Haiti, Vietnam.
Fewest goals conceded
1: Portugal.
Highest goal difference
+103: United States.
Lowest goal difference
–42: Nigeria.
Highest average of goals scored per match
2.78: Germany.
Highest average of goals conceded per match
5.67: Ecuador.
Most meetings between two teams
7 times: United States vs Sweden (4–2–1) (1991, 2003, 2007, 2011, 2015, 2019, 2023).
Most tournaments unbeaten
5: United States (1991, 1999, 2015, 2019, 2023).

=== In one tournament ===
Most wins
7: United States (2019).
Fewest wins, champions
4: Japan (2011) (out of 6).
Most losses, champions
1: Japan (2011), Spain (2023).
Most goals scored
26: United States (2019).
Most goals scored, group stage
18: United States (2019).
Most goals scored, champions
26: United States (2019).
Most goals scored, hosts
18, United States (1999).
Most goals scored, eliminated in the first round
8: Germany (2023).
Fewest goals scored, champions
12: Japan (2011).
Fewest goals scored, hosts
1: New Zealand (2023).
Most goals conceded, champions
7: Spain (2023).
Most goals conceded, hosts
8: Australia (2023).
Fewest goals conceded, champions
0: Germany (2007).
Fewest goals conceded, hosts
1: New Zealand (2023).
Fewest goals conceded, eliminated in the first round
1: New Zealand (2023), Portugal (2023).
Most consecutive minutes without conceding a goal
540 minutes: Germany (2007), United States (2015).
Highest goal difference
+23: United States (2019).
Highest goal difference, champions
+23: United States (2019).
Highest goal difference, hosts
+15: United States (1999).
Lowest goal difference
-19: Thailand (2019).
Lowest goal difference, champions
+6: Japan (2011).
Lowest goal difference, hosts
-2: China (2007).
Highest average of goals scored per match
4.16: United States (1991), Germany (2003).
Highest average of goals scored per match, champions
4.16: United States (1991), Germany (2003).
Lowest average of goals scored per match
0.00: Japan (1991), Nigeria (1991), Nigeria (2003), New Zealand (2007), Colombia (2011), North Korea (2011), Haiti (2023), Vietnam (2023).
Lowest average of goals scored per match, champions
2.00: Japan (2011), United States (2015).
Highest average of goals conceded per match
6.67: Thailand (2019).
Highest average of goals conceded per match, champions
1.00: Japan (2011), Spain (2023).
Lowest average of goals conceded per match
0.00: Germany (2007).
Lowest average of goals conceded per match, champions
0.00: Germany (2007).

== Streaks ==
Most consecutive successful qualification attempts without automatic spots
9: Brazil, Japan, Nigeria, Norway (1991–2023).
Most consecutive wins
13: United States, from 1–0 vs Nigeria (2015) to 3–0 vs Vietnam (2023).
Most consecutive matches without a loss
21: United States, from 2–2 vs Brazil (2011) to 0–0 vs Sweden (2023).
Most consecutive losses
8: New Zealand, from 0–3 vs Denmark (1991) to 1–2 vs England (2011).
Most consecutive draws
3: Sweden, from 3–3 vs Nigeria (2015) to 1–1 vs Australia (2015), United States, from 1–1 vs Netherlands (2023) to 0–0 vs Sweden (2023).
Most consecutive matches without a draw
17: Norway, from 0–4 vs China (1991) to 0–5 vs China (1999).
Most consecutive top-scoring team
2: Germany (2003–2007).
Most consecutive matches scoring at least one goal
16: England (2015–2023).
Most consecutive matches scoring at least two goals
10: United States (1991–1995), Germany (1999–2007), United States (2015–2023).
Most consecutive matches scoring at least three goals
5: United States (1991), Germany (2003).
Most consecutive matches scoring at least five goals
2: United States (1991).
Most consecutive matches without conceding a goal (clean sheets)
6: Germany (2007).
Most consecutive minutes without conceding a goal
671 minutes: Germany (2003–2011).
Most consecutive matches conceding at least three goals
4: New Zealand (1991–2007), Argentina (2003–2007).
Most consecutive matches conceding at least four goals
3: Australia (1995), Ghana (2007), Thailand (2015–2019).
Most consecutive matches conceding at least six goals
2: Mexico (1999), Argentina (2003–2007), Ecuador (2015).

== Individual ==
Most tournaments played
7: Formiga (Brazil, 1995–2019).
Most tournaments in squad
7: Formiga (Brazil, 1995–2019).
See here for a list of players who have appeared in four or more FIFA Women's World Cups.
Most championships
2: 32 players.
See here for a list of FIFA Women's World Cup winning players.
Most medals
5: Kristine Lilly (United States, 1991–2007), Christie Rampone (United States, 1999–2015).
Most appearances in All-Star Team
2: 10 players. (Note: The players are: Wang Liping (China, 1999–2003), Bettina Wiegmann (Germany, 1999–2003), Birgit Prinz (Germany, 2003–2007), Shannon Boxx (United States, 2003, 2011), Marta (Brazil, 2007–2011); Nadine Angerer (Germany, 2007, 2015); Lisa De Vanna (Australia, 2007, 2015); Elise Kellond-Knight (Australia, 2011–2015); Aya Miyama (Japan, 2011–2015); Hope Solo (United States, 2011–2015))
Most matches played, finals
30: Kristine Lilly (United States, 1991–2007).
Most knockout games played, finals
15: Kristine Lilly (United States, 1991–2007).
Most minutes played, finals
2,537 minutes: Kristine Lilly (United States, 1991–2007).
Most matches won
24: Kristine Lilly (United States, 1991–2007).
Most matches drawn
5: Sun Wen (China, 1991–2003).
Most matches lost
10: Florence Omagbemi (Nigeria, 1991–2003), Onome Ebi (Nigeria, 2003–2019).
Most appearances in a World Cup final
3: Birgit Prinz (Germany; 1995, 2003–2007), Tobin Heath (United States, 2011–2019), Ali Krieger (United States, 2011–2019), Carli Lloyd (United States, 2011–2019), Alex Morgan (United States, 2011–2019), Megan Rapinoe (United States, 2011–2019).
Most appearances as captain
17: Christine Sinclair (Canada, 2007–2023).
Most tournaments as captain
5: Christine Sinclair (Canada, 2007–2023).
Most appearances as substitute
8: Tiffeny Milbrett (United States, 1995–2003), Zhang Ouying (China, 1999–2007), Carli Lloyd (United States, 2007–2019).
Youngest player
16 years, 26 days: Casey Phair (South Korea), vs Colombia, 25 July 2023.
Youngest player, final
17 years, 236 days: Birgit Prinz (Germany), vs Norway, 18 June 1995.
Youngest player, qualifying match
13 years, 131 days: Alina Litvinenko (Kyrgyzstan), vs Jordan, 27 April 2009.
Youngest captain
19 years, 261 days: Nkiru Okosieme (Nigeria), vs Germany, 17 November 1991.
Oldest player
41 years, 112 days: Formiga (Brazil), vs France, 23 June 2019.
Oldest player, final
40 years, 11 days: Christie Rampone (United States), vs Japan, 5 July 2015.
Oldest player, qualifying match
49 years, 110 days: Tonina Dimech (Malta), vs Turkey, 11 April 2010.
Oldest captain
40 years, 49 days: Christine Sinclair (Canada), vs Australia, 31 July 2023.
Oldest player to debut in a World Cup finals tournament
35 years, 320 days: Meg (Brazil), vs Japan, 17 November 1991.
Largest age difference on the same team
22 years, 256 days: South Korea (2023) (Kim Jung-mi: 38 years, 277 days; Casey Phair: 16 years, 21 days).
Largest age difference on a champion team
18 years, 61 days: Japan (2011) (Nozomi Yamago: 36 years, 182 days; Mana Iwabuchi: 18 years, 121 days).
Longest period between World Cup finals appearances as a player
15 years and 295 days: Wendi Henderson (New Zealand, 1991–2007).
Longest span of World Cup finals appearances as a player
24 years: Formiga (Brazil, 1995–2019).

== Goalscoring ==
=== Individual ===
Most goals scored, overall finals
17: Marta (Brazil, 2003–2019).
Most goals scored in a tournament
10: Michelle Akers (United States, 1991).
Most goals scored in a match
5: Michelle Akers (United States), vs Chinese Taipei, 1991; Alex Morgan (United States), vs Thailand, 2019.
Most goals scored in a lost match
2: Genoveva Añonma (Equatorial Guinea), vs Australia, 2011; Arianna Caruso (Italy), vs South Africa, 2023.
Most goals scored in a final match
3: Carli Lloyd (United States) vs Japan, 2015.
Most goals scored in all final matches
3: Carli Lloyd (United States), 3 vs Japan in 2015.
Most matches with at least one goal
12: Abby Wambach (United States, 2003–2015).
Most consecutive matches with at least one goal
6: Carli Lloyd (United States, 2015–2019).
Most matches with at least two goals
5: Marta (Brazil, 2003–2011).
Most consecutive matches with at least two goals
2: Michelle Akers (United States, 1991), Heidi Mohr (Germany, 1991), Sissi (Brazil, 1999), Sun Wen (China, 1999), Marta (Brazil, 2007), Megan Rapinoe (United States, 2019).
Fastest hat-trick
5 minutes: Fabienne Humm (Switzerland), scored at 47', 49' and 52' vs Ecuador, 2015.
Fastest hat-trick from kickoff
16th minute: Carli Lloyd (United States), scored at 3', 5' and 16' vs Japan, 2015.
Most tournaments with at least one goal
5: Marta (Brazil, 2003–2019), Christine Sinclair (Canada, 2003–2019).
Most tournaments with at least two goals
4: Mia Hamm (United States, 1991–2003), Bettina Wiegmann (Germany, 1991–2003), Marta (Brazil, 2003–2011, 2019).
Most tournaments with at least three goals
3: Bettina Wiegmann (Germany, 1991–1999), Marta (Brazil, 2003–2011), Abby Wambach (United States, 2003–2011).
Most tournaments with at least four goals
2: Ann Kristin Aarønes (Norway, 1995-1999), Birgit Prinz (Germany, 2003-2007), Marta (Brazil, 2007–2011), Abby Wambach (United States, 2007–2011), Cristiane (Brazil, 2007, 2019).
Most tournaments with at least five goals
2: Birgit Prinz (Germany, 2003–2007).
Longest period between a player's first and last goals
15 years, 364 days: Solveig Gulbrandsen (Norway, 23 June 1999 – 22 June 2015).
Longest period between one goal and the next
12 years, 98 days: Anne Dot Eggers Nielsen (Denmark, 6 June 1995 – 12 September 2007).
Youngest goalscorer
16 years, 107 days: Elena Danilova (Russia), vs Germany, 2 October 2003.
Youngest hat-trick scorer
20 years, 236 days: Inka Grings (Germany), vs Mexico, 24 June 1999.
Youngest goalscorer, final
20 years, 67 days: Marianne Pettersen (Norway), vs Germany, 18 June 1995.
Oldest goalscorer
37 years, 98 days: Formiga (Brazil), vs South Korea, 9 June 2015.
Oldest hat-trick scorer
34 years, 25 days: Cristiane (Brazil), vs Jamaica, 9 June 2019.
Oldest goalscorer, final
34 years, 2 days: Megan Rapinoe (United States), vs Netherlands, 7 July 2019.
Most penalties scored (excluding during shootouts)
8: Bettina Wiegmann (Germany, 2 each in 1991, 1995, 1999, 2003).
First substitute winning goalscorer, final
came on 88th minute: Nia Künzer (Germany), vs Sweden, 2003.
Fastest goal from kickoff
30 seconds: Lena Videkull (Sweden), vs Japan, 1991.
Fastest goal by a substitute
3 minutes: Pia Wunderlich (Germany), vs Russia, 2003; Linda Sembrant (Sweden), vs Nigeria, 2015.
Fastest goal from kickoff in a final
3rd minute: Carli Lloyd (United States), vs Japan, 2015.
Latest goal from kickoff
122nd minute: Abby Wambach (United States), vs Brazil, 2011.
Latest goal from kickoff in a final
117th minute: Homare Sawa (Japan), vs United States, 2011.
Latest goal from kickoff in a final, with no goals scored between
69th minute: Alex Morgan (United States), vs Japan, 2011.

=== Team ===
Biggest margin of victory
13: United States (13) vs Thailand (0), 2019.
Biggest margin of victory, qualifying match
21: Japan (21) vs Guam (0), 1997 AFC Championship Group A; Canada (21) vs Puerto Rico (0), 1998 CONCACAF Championship Group A; New Zealand (21) vs Samoa (0), 1998 OFC Championship Group A; Australia (21) vs American Samoa (0), 1998 OFC Championship Group B; Haiti (21) vs British Virgin Islands (0), 2022 CONCACAF Women's Championship Qualification.
Most goals scored in a match, one team
13: United States, vs Thailand, 2019.
Most goals scored in a match, both teams
13: United States (13) vs Thailand (0), 2019.
Highest scoring draw
3–3: Nigeria vs Sweden, 2015; Argentina vs Scotland, 2019.
Most goals scored in extra time, both teams
2: Brazil (1) vs United States (1), 2011; Japan (1) vs United States (1), 2011.
Most goals scored in a semi-final, one team
5: United States, vs Germany, 1991; China, vs Norway, 1999.
Most goals scored in a semi-final, both teams
7: United States (5) vs Germany (2), 1991.
Most goals scored in a final, one team
5: United States, vs Japan, 2015.
Most goals scored in a final, both teams
7: United States (5) vs Japan (2), 2015.
Fewest goals scored in a final, both teams
0: United States (0) vs China (0), 1999.
Most individual goalscorers for one team, one match
7: United States, vs Thailand, 2019 (Alex Morgan, Rose Lavelle, Lindsey Horan, Sam Mewis, Megan Rapinoe, Mallory Pugh, Carli Lloyd).
Most individual goalscorers for one team, one tournament
10: United States (1999: Mia Hamm, Julie Foudy, Kristine Lilly, Tiffeny Milbrett, Michelle Akers, Cindy Parlow, Shannon MacMillan, Tisha Venturini, Brandi Chastain, Joy Fawcett), Germany (2003: Bettina Wiegmann, Stefanie Gottschlich, Birgit Prinz, Kerstin Garefrekes, Sandra Minnert, Maren Meinert, Conny Pohlers, Martina Müller, Pia Wunderlich, Nia Künzer).
Fewest individual goalscorers for one team, one tournament, champions
6: Japan (2011: Nahomi Kawasumi, Karina Maruyama, Aya Miyama, Yūki Nagasato, Shinobu Ohno, Homare Sawa).

=== Tournament ===
Most goals scored in a tournament
164 goals: 2023.
Fewest goals scored in a tournament
86 goals: 2011.
Most goals per match in a tournament
3.84 goals per match: 1999.
Fewest goals per match in a tournament
2.56 goals per match: 2023.
Most scorers in a tournament
100: 2023.
Most players scoring at least two goals in a tournament
33: 2023.
Most players scoring at least three goals in a tournament
17: 2023.
Most players scoring at least four goals in a tournament
9: 1991.
Most players scoring at least five goals in a tournament
5: 1991, 2007.
Most players scoring at least six goals in a tournament
4: 1991 (Michelle Akers (United States), Carin Jennings (United States), Linda Medalen (Norway), Heidi Mohr (Germany)).
Most players scoring at least seven goals in a tournament
2: 1991 (Michelle Akers (United States), Heidi Mohr (Germany)), 1999 (Sissi (Brazil), Sun Wen (China)).

=== Own goals ===
Most own goals in a tournament
8: 2019, 2023.
Most own goals scored in a match, player
2: Angie Ponce (Ecuador), vs Switzerland, 2015.
Most own goals scored in a match, one team
2: Ecuador, vs Switzerland, 2015; Morocco vs Germany, 2023.
Scoring for both teams in the same match
Brandi Chastain (United States), vs Germany, 1999 – own goal in the 5th minute, goal in the 49th minute; Eva González (Argentina), vs England, 2007 – own goal in the 9th minute, goal in the 60th minute; Angie Ponce (Ecuador), vs Switzerland, 2015 – two own goals in the 24th minute and 71st minute, goal in the 64th minute.

=== Top-scoring teams by tournament ===
- 1991: **United States**, 25 goals
- 1995: **Norway**, 23 goals
- 1999: China, 19 goals
- 2003: **Germany**, 25 goals
- 2007: **Germany**, 21 goals
- 2011: United States, 13 goals
- 2015: Germany, 20 goals
- 2019: **United States**, 26 goals
- 2023: **Spain**, 18 goals

Teams listed in bold won the tournament.

=== Total and average goals ===
Year	Teams	Matches	Goals	Top scorer	Average goals
1991	**12**	**26**	99	**10**	3.81
1995	**12**	**26**	99	6	3.81
1999	16	32	123	7	**3.84**
2003	16	32	107	7	3.34
2007	16	32	111	7	3.47
2011	16	32	**86**	**5**	2.69
2015	24	52	146	6	2.81
2019	24	52	146	6	2.81
2023	**32**	**64**	**164**	**5**	**2.59**

Most and fewest in bold.

== Assists ==
Most assists, overall finals
13: Mia Hamm (United States, 1995–2003).
Most assists in a tournament
7: Maren Meinert (Germany, 2003).
Most tournaments with at least one assist
4: Kristine Lilly (United States, 1995–2007), Therese Sjögran (Sweden, 2003–2015).
Most tournaments with at least two assists
3: Mia Hamm (United States, 1995–2003).
Most tournaments with at least three assists
2: Mia Hamm (United States, 1995, 2003), Megan Rapinoe (United States, 2011, 2019).
Most tournaments with at least four assists
2: Mia Hamm (United States, 1995, 2003).
Most individual assisters for one team, one tournament
10: United States (2019: Tierna Davidson, Crystal Dunn, Tobin Heath, Lindsey Horan, Sam Mewis, Alex Morgan, Kelley O'Hara, Christen Press, Mallory Pugh, Megan Rapinoe).
Fewest individual assisters for one team, one tournament, champions
5: Japan (2011: Yukari Kinga, Aya Miyama, Yūki Nagasato, Shinobu Ohno, Homare Sawa), United States (2015: Julie Johnston, Ali Krieger, Sydney Leroux, Carli Lloyd, Megan Rapinoe).

== Goalkeeping ==
Most matches played, finals
22: Bente Nordby (Norway, 1995–2007).
Most clean sheets (matches without conceding)
10: Briana Scurry (United States, 1995–2007).
Most consecutive minutes without conceding a goal (finals)
622 minutes (6 consecutive clean sheets): Nadine Angerer (Germany, 2007-2011).
Most consecutive minutes without conceding a goal (one tournament)
540 minutes: Nadine Angerer (Germany, 2007), Hope Solo (United States, 2015).
Most goals conceded, one tournament
17: Shirley Berruz (Ecuador, 2015).
Most goals conceded, one tournament, hosts
7: Mackenzie Arnold (Australia, 2023).
Most goals conceded, one match
13: Sukanya Chor Charoenying (Thailand), vs United States, 2019.
Fewest goals conceded, one tournament
0: Nadine Angerer (Germany, 2007).
Fewest goals conceded, one tournament, champions
0: Nadine Angerer (Germany, 2007).
Fewest goals conceded, penalty shootouts, one match
1: Ayumi Kaihori (Japan), vs United States, 2011; Ingrid Hjelmseth (Norway), vs Australia, 2019.
Youngest goalkeeper
16 years, 251 days: Cecilia Santiago (Mexico), vs England, 27 June 2011.
Oldest goalkeeper
39 years, 353 days: Vanina Correa (Argentina), vs Sweden, 2 August 2023.

== Coaching ==
Most matches coached
25: Even Pellerud (Norway, 1991–1995, 2015; Canada, 2003–2007).
Most matches won
16: Even Pellerud (Norway, 1991–1995, 2015; Canada, 2003–2007).
Most matches lost
9: Tom Sermanni (Australia, 1995, 2007–2011; New Zealand, 2019).
Most finals won
2: Jill Ellis (United States, 2015–2019).
Most finals lost
2: Sarina Wiegman (Netherlands, 2019; England, 2023).
Most tournaments
5: Even Pellerud (1991–1995, 2003–2007, 2015).
Most different nations coached
3: Pia Sundhage (United States, 2011; Sweden, 2015; Brazil, 2023).
Most consecutive tournaments with same team
3: Silvia Neid (Germany, 2007–2015).
Youngest coach
26 years, 4 months and 3 days: Vanessa Arauz (Ecuador), vs Cameroon, 8 June 2015.
Youngest coach, champions
40 years, 7 months and 21 days: Anson Dorrance (United States), 1991.
Oldest coach
72 years, 1 month and 11 days: Mai Đức Chung (Vietnam), vs Netherlands, 1 August 2023.
Oldest coach, champions
53 years, 1 month and 23 days: Norio Sasaki (Japan), 2011.
Quickest substitution made
6th minute: Chong Tsu-pin (Chinese Taipei), Hong Li-chyn for Liu Hsiu-mei, vs Nigeria, 1991; Marika Domanski-Lyfors (Sweden), Therese Lundin for Hanna Ljungberg, vs Ghana, 1999.
Most finals appearances as player and head coach
6: Martina Voss-Tecklenburg, Germany (1991, 1995 & 1999 as player; 2015, 2019 & 2023 as coach).
First person to have played and coached at the finals
April Heinrichs, was the first person to have had both roles – as player for United States in 1991 and later as coach in 2003.
Best performance by a foreign coach
A foreign coach has never managed a World Cup-winning team. The best performance by a team with a foreign coach is second place, reached by the United States in 2011 with Pia Sundhage of Sweden and England in 2023 with Sarina Wiegman of the Netherlands. The USA's coach for their 2015 and 2019 victories, Jill Ellis, was born and spent her early childhood in England, but moved to the U.S. with her family at age 14, and had been a U.S. citizen for many years before becoming head coach in 2014.

== Ages average ==
Youngest team
18 years, 8 months: Nigeria, 1991.
Youngest team, champions
23 years, 8 months: United States, 1991.
Oldest team
29 years, 5 months: United States, 2015.
Oldest team, champions
29 years, 5 months: United States, 2015.
Lowest average of age at tournament
23 years, 11 months: 1991.
Highest average of age at tournament
25 years, 2 months: 2007.

== Refereeing ==
Most tournaments
4: Kari Seitz (United States, 1999–2011).
Most matches refereed, overall
10: Nicole Petignat (Switzerland, 1999–2007).
Most matches refereed, one tournament
5: Anna-Marie Keighley (New Zealand, 2015), Tori Penso (United States, 2023).

== Discipline ==
Fastest sending off
2nd minute: Alicia Ferguson (Australia), vs China, 1999.
Latest sending off
121st minute: Azusa Iwashimizu (Japan), vs United States, 2011.
Most cautions (all-time, player)
5: Charmaine Hooper (Canada, 1995–2003).
Most sendings off (tournament)
6: 2023 (in 64 matches).
Most sendings off (all-time, team)
4: Nigeria.
Most cautions (tournament)
124: 2019 (in 52 matches).
Most cautions (all-time, team)
55: Brazil (in 34 matches).
Most cautions (match, both teams)
8: Brazil (4) vs United States (4), 2011.
Most cautions (final match, one team)
3: Norway, vs Germany, 1995.

== Host records ==
Most times hosted
2: United States (1999, 2003), China (1991, 2007).
Had its best performance hosting

Champions: United States (1999)

4th Place: Australia (2023)

== Attendance ==
Highest attendance in a match
90,185: United States vs China, 10 July 1999, Rose Bowl, Pasadena, United States.
Highest attendance in a final
90,185: United States vs China, 10 July 1999, Rose Bowl, Pasadena, United States.
Lowest attendance in a match
250: Nigeria vs Canada, 8 June 1995, Olympia, Helsingborg, Sweden.
Highest average of attendance per match
37,319: 1999, hosted by the United States.
Highest attendance in a tournament
1,978,274: 2023, hosted by Australia and New Zealand.
Lowest average of attendance per match
4,316: 1995, hosted by Sweden.
Lowest attendance in a tournament
112,213: 1995, hosted by Sweden.

=== Total and average attendance ===
Year	Matches	Attendance							
Year	Matches	Total	Average	Lowest			Highest		
1991	26	510,000	19,615	TPE – GER	Round 1	10,000	CHN – NOR	Round 1	65,000
1995	26	112,213	4,316	NGA – CAN	Round 1	250	GER – NOR	Final	17,158
1999	32	1,194,215	37,319	NOR – CHN	Semi-final	8,986	NOR – BRA; USA – CHN	Third place match Final	90,185
2003	32	656,789	20,525	AUS – RUS	Round 1	8,500	USA – SWE	Round 1	35,000
2007	32	1,156,955	36,155	SWE – NGA	Round 1	21,740	CHN – NZL	Round 1	56,208
2011	32	845,751	26,430	PRK – COL	Round 1	7,805	GER – CAN	Round 1	73,680
2015	52	1,353,506	26,029	CIV – NOR	Round 1	7,147	CAN – ENG	Quarter-final	54,027
2019	52	1,131,312	21,756	CMR – NZL	Round 1	8,009	USA – NED	Final	57,900
2023	64	1,978,274	30,911	POR – VIE	Round 1	6,645	AUS – IRL; AUS – DEN; ENG – COL; AUS – ENG; ESP – ENG	Round 1 Round of 16; Quarter-final; Semi-final; Final	75,784

== Penalty shoot-outs ==
Most shootouts, team, all-time
4: United States.
Most shootouts, team, tournament
2: United States, 2011.
Most shootouts, all teams, tournament
3: 2011, 2023.
Fewest shootouts, all teams, tournament
0: 1991, 2003, 2007.
Most wins, team, all-time
2: United States.
Most losses, team, all-time
2: United States.
Most shootouts, kicker, all-time
2: 12 players. (Note: The players are: Sun Wen (China; 1995 quarter-final, 1999 final), Xie Huilin (China; 1995 quarter-final, 1999 final), Shannon Boxx (United States; 2011 quarter-final, 2011 final), Carli Lloyd (United States; 2011 quarter-final, 2011 final), Abby Wambach (United States; 2011 quarter-final, 2011 final), Camille Abily (France; 2011 quarter-final, 2015 quarter-final), Gaëtane Thiney (France; 2011 quarter-final, 2015 quarter-final), Megan Rapinoe (United States; 2011 quarter-final, 2023 round of 16, Eugénie Le Sommer (France; 2011 quarter-final, 2023 quarter-final), Wendie Renard (France; 2015 quarter-final, 2023 quarter-final), Steph Catley (Australia; 2019 round of 16, 2023 quarter-final), Sam Kerr (Australia; 2019 round of 16, 2023 quarter-final))
Most penalties missed against, all-time
4: Mackenzie Arnold (Australia).
Most penalties missed against, tournament
4: Mackenzie Arnold (Australia), vs France, 2023.
Most penalties missed against, shootout
4: Mackenzie Arnold (Australia), 4 vs France in 2023.

== Extra time ==
=== By team ===
Most played
5: Germany (1991, 2003, 2011, 2015, 2015).
Most tournaments playing extra time
4: Germany (1991, 2003, 2011, 2015).

=== By tournament ===
Most played
4: 2011, 2023
Fewest played
0: 2007

== See also ==
- FIFA World Cup records and statistics
- FIFA Women's World Cup qualification
