= 1998 OFC Women's Championship =

Tournament details
- Host country: New Zealand
- Dates: 9–17 October
- Teams: 6 (from 1 confederation)
- Venue: 1 (in 1 host city)

Final positions
- Champions: Australia (2nd title)
- Runners-up: New Zealand
- Third place: Papua New Guinea
- Fourth place: Fiji

Tournament statistics
- Matches played: 10
- Goals scored: 112 (11.2 per match)
- Top scorer(s): (New Zealand) Pernille Andersen (15 goals)

The 1998 OFC Women's Championship, also known as the VI Ladies Oceania Nations Cup was held in Auckland, New Zealand between 9 October & 17 October 1998. It was the sixth staging of the OFC Women's Championship. The 1998 OFC Women's Championship, like its previous edition, served as the OFC's qualifying tournament for the 1999 FIFA Women's World Cup. OFC's only berth was given to the winner – Australia.

== Participating nations ==
Of the twelve nations affiliated to the Oceania Football Confederation, six entered the tournament.

Team	Tournament appearance	Last appearance	Previous best performance
American Samoa	1st	—	—
Australia	6th	1994	Winners (1994)
Fiji	2nd	1983	4th (1983)
New Zealand	6th	1994	Winners (1983, 1991)
Papua New Guinea	4th	1994	3rd (1991, 1994)
Samoa	1st	—	—

=== Did not enter ===
- Cook Islands
- New Caledonia
- Solomon Islands
- Tahiti
- Tonga
- Vanuatu

== First round ==
=== Group A ===
Team	Pld	W	D	L	GF	GA	GD	Pts
New Zealand	2	2	0	0	35	0	+35	6
Fiji	2	1	0	1	5	14	−9	3
Samoa	2	0	0	2	0	26	−26	0

9 October 1998

New Zealand	21–0	Samoa
Andersen 9', 11', 18', 38', 45', ?'; Henderson 16', 75', 78', 86'; Haskell 12', 28', 40', 67'; Unknown 22' (o.g.); Cox 52', 83'; Smith 62', 66'; Crawford 64'; Jackman 82'	Report

Mt Smart Stadium, Auckland
Attendance: 600
Referee: Tammy Peacock (Australia)

11 October 1998

New Zealand	14–0	Fiji
Andersen 6', 9', 27' (pen.), 45+?', 47', 77', ?'; Haskell 17', 29', 32'; Ruscoe 31'; Cox 45+?'; Crawford 65'; Smith 90+?' (pen.)	Report

Mt Smart Stadium, Auckland
Referee: Tammy Peacock (Australia)

13 October 1998

Fiji	5–0	Samoa
Kubulala ?'

Mt Smart Stadium, Auckland

=== Group B ===
Team	Pld	W	D	L	GF	GA	GD	Pts
Australia	2	2	0	0	29	0	+29	6
Papua New Guinea	2	1	0	1	9	8	+1	3
American Samoa	2	0	0	2	0	30	−30	0

9 October 1998

Australia	21–0	American Samoa
Thomas 4', 35', 55'; Casagrande 19', 59'; Tann-Darby 28'; Salisbury 29', 58', 72', 81', 90+3'; Black 37', 68', 88', 90+5'; Ferguson 44', 79'; Taylor 50'; Forman 66'; Peters 78'; Boyd 90+6'	Report

Mt Smart Stadium, Auckland

11 October 1998

Australia	8–0	Papua New Guinea
Black 3', 18', 22'; Casagrande 28'; Salisbury 66', 67', 86'; Boyd 90+2'	Report

Mt Smart Stadium, Auckland

13 October 1998

Papua New Guinea	9–0	American Samoa
Taman ?'

Mt Smart Stadium, Auckland

== Knockout stage ==
Semi-finals
15 October
New Zealand	5
Papua New Guinea	0
15 October
Australia	17
Fiji	0

Final
17 October – Auckland
New Zealand	1
Australia	3
Third place
17 October
Papua New Guinea	7
Fiji	1

=== Semi-finals ===
15 October 1998

New Zealand	5–0	Papua New Guinea
Andersen 6', 55' (pen.); Henderson 38'; Carlisle ?'; Cox 40'	Report

Mt Smart Stadium, Auckland
Referee: Massimo Raveino (Tahiti)

15 October 1998

Australia	17–0	Fiji
Murray 3', 23', 47'; Iannotta 7', 43'; Boyd 23', 39'; Black 33', 40', 55'; Peters 49', 53', 58', 81'; Ferguson 69', 72'; Salisbury 83'	Report

Mt Smart Stadium, Auckland

=== Third place playoff ===
17 October 1998

Papua New Guinea	7–1	Fiji

Mt Smart Stadium, Auckland

=== Final ===
17 October 1998

New Zealand	1–3	Australia
Smith 77'	Report	Murray 2'; Starr 13'; Casagrande 66'

Mt Smart Stadium, Auckland
Attendance: 2000
Referee: Massimo Raveino (Tahiti)

Australia won the tournament and qualified for 1999 FIFA Women's World Cup.

== Awards ==
1998 OFC Women's Championship winners

Australia
Second title

== Goalscorers ==
15 goals

- (New Zealand) Pernille Andersen

10 goals

- (Australia) Sharon Black

9 goals

- (Australia) Cheryl Salisbury

7 goals

- (New Zealand) Sacha Haskell

5 goals

- (Australia) Joanne Peters
- (New Zealand) Wendi Henderson

4 goals

- (Australia) Alicia Ferguson
- (Australia) Julie Murray
- (Australia) Katrina Boyd
- (Australia) Lisa Casagrande
- (New Zealand) Michele Cox
- (New Zealand) Nicky Smith

3 goals

- (Australia) Natalie Thomas

2 goals

- (Australia) Angela Iannotta
- (New Zealand) Amanda Crawford

1 goals

- (Australia) Alison Forman
- (Australia) Amy Duggan
- (Australia) Anissa Tann
- (Australia) Bridgette Starr
- (Fiji) Losana Kubulala
- (New Zealand) Jennifer Carlisle
- (New Zealand) Maia Jackman
- (New Zealand) Melissa Ruscoe
- (Papua New Guinea) Nellie Taman

Unknown goalscorers

- Fiji: 5 additional goals
- Papua New Guinea: 15 additional goals

Own goal

- (Samoa) Unknown player (playing against New Zealand)
