= Mana'o =

Mana'o may refer to:

== People ==
- Ava Mana'o
- Alma Mana'o

== Other ==
- "Mana'o", Hawaii Five-0 (2010 TV series, season 1)#ep8

== See also ==
- Manao (disambiguation)
