= 1995–96 in Australian soccer =

Soccer in Australia
- Season: 1995–96

Men's soccer
- NSL Premiership: Marconi Fairfield
- NSL Championship: Melbourne Knights
- NSL Cup: South Melbourne

The 1995–96 season was the 27th season of national competitive soccer in Australia and 113th overall.

== National teams ==
=== Men's senior ===
==== Results and fixtures ====
===== Friendlies =====
10 February 1996	Australia	1–4	Japan	Wollongong, Australia
	Awaritefe 87'	Report	Yamaguchi 35'; Takagi 60', 85'; Moriasu 89'	Stadium: Brandon Park; Attendance: 8,396; Referee: Brett Hugo (Australia)

14 February 1996	Australia	3–0	Japan	Melbourne, Australia
	Mori 15'; Spiteri 70'; Bingley 74'	Report		Stadium: Lakeside Stadium; Attendance: 4,397

25 February 1996	Australia	0–2	Sweden	Brisbane, Australia
		Report	Andersson 86', 87'	Stadium: Lang Park; Referee: Eugene Brazzale (Australia)

28 February 1996	Australia	0–0	Sweden	Sydney, Australia
		Report		Stadium: Sydney Football Stadium; Attendance: 13,905; Referee: Eddie Lennie (Australia)

27 March 1996	Scotland	1–0	Australia	Glasgow, Scotland
	McCoist 53'	Report		Stadium: Hampden Park; Attendance: 20,608

24 April 1996	Chile	3–0	Australia	Antofagasta, Chile
	Zamorano 52', 82'; Valencia 62'	Report		Stadium: Estadio Regional; Attendance: 30,000

===== 1996 OFC Nations Cup =====
10 November 1995 Semi-finals 1st Leg	New Zealand	0–0	Australia	Christchurch, New Zealand
		Report		Stadium: Queen Elizabeth II Park; Attendance: 8,000; Referee: Barry Tasker (New Zealand)

15 November 1995 Semi-finals 2nd Leg	Australia	3–0 (3–0 agg.)	New Zealand	Newcastle, Australia
	Mori 33'; Wade 45' (pen.); Spiteri 51'	Report		Stadium: Breakers Stadium; Attendance: 8,858; Referee: Simon Micallef (Australia)

=== Women's senior ===
==== Results and fixtures ====
===== Friendlies =====
24 March 1996	Australia	3–0	New Zealand	Auckland, New Zealand
	Salisbury ?'; Peters ?'; Boyd ?'	Report		Stadium: Ken Maunder Park

25 March 1996	South Korea	0–1	Australia	Auckland, New Zealand
		Report	Casagrande 67'	Stadium: Ken Maunder Park

29 March 1996	Australia	1–2	South Korea	Auckland, New Zealand
	Boyd 4'	Report	Sung-mi 10'; Yun-hee 56'	Stadium: Ken Maunder Park

30 March 1996	New Zealand	0–2	Australia	Auckland, New Zealand
		Report	Hughes 6'; Boyd 55'	Stadium: Ken Maunder Park

===== 1995 Women's U.S. Cup =====
Pos	Team	Pld	W	D	L	GF	GA	GD	Pts
1	United States (C, H)	3	3	0	0	15	3	+12	9
2	Norway	3	2	0	1	15	3	+12	6
3	Australia	3	1	0	2	5	8	−3	3
4	Chinese Taipei	3	0	0	3	3	24	−21	0

Source: RSSSF
(C) Champions; (H) Hosts

29 July 1995	Norway	2–0	Australia	Massachusetts, United States
	Medalen 20'; Pettersen 56'	Report		Stadium: Foley Stadium

3 August 1995	United States	4–2	Australia	New Jersey, United States
	Lilly 14'; Hamm 24', 84'; Akers 35'	Report	Iannotta 23'; Casagrande 34'	Stadium: Rutgers Soccer Stadium

3 August 1995	Australia	3–2	Chinese Taipei	Richmond, United States
	Tann ?' (pen.); Casagrande ?'; Pentecost ?', ?'	Report	?', ?'	Stadium: Richmond Stadium

=== Men's under-23 ===
==== Results and fixtures ====
===== Friendlies =====
19 May 1996	United States	0–2	Australia	Indianapolis, United States
		Report	Viduka 53', 59'	Attendance: 2,211; Referee: Ted Covaciu (United States)

===== 1996 OFC Men's Olympic Qualifying Tournament =====
Pos	Team	Pld	W	D	L	GF	GA	GD	Pts	Qualification	(Australia)	(New Zealand)	(Fiji)	(Solomon Islands)	(Vanuatu)
1	Australia (C, H)	8	6	0	2	48	4	+44	18	Advance to play-offs	—	0–1	10–0	7–0	9–1
2	New Zealand	8	6	0	2	28	9	+19	18		0–5	—	1–2	2–0	5–1
3	Fiji	8	3	1	4	12	21	−9	10		0–5	1–3	—	4–0	4–0
4	Solomon Islands	8	2	2	4	6	22	−16	8		2–0 (Note: Australia won the match 4–0 but were penalised for fielding an ineligible player. Solomon Islands were awarded a 2–0 win.)	0–6	1–1	—	2–1
5	Vanuatu	8	1	1	6	5	43	−38	4		0–12	0–10	1–0	1–1	—

Source: RSSSF
(C) Champions; (H) Hosts
Notes:

13 January 1996	Australia	9–1	Vanuatu	Adelaide, Australia
	Mendez 28', 47' (pen.); Spiteri 30', 45', 65'; Tiatto 51'; Viduka 62', 83'; Tome 72'	Report	Mermer 66'	Stadium: Hindmarsh Stadium; Attendance: Referee: Intaz Shah (Fiji)

17 January 1996	Solomon Islands	2–0 (Note: Australia won the match 4–0, but were penalised for fielding an ineligible player. Solomon Islands were awarded a 2–0 win on 23 January.)	Australia	Adelaide, Australia
		Report	Muscat 23'; Mendez 27' (pen.); Aloisi 47'; Tiatto 88'	Stadium: Hindmarsh Stadium; Referee: Kaltatak Kalokis (Vanuatu)

19 January 1996	Australia	10–0	Fiji	Adelaide, Australia
	Viduka 29', 76'; Aloisi 32'; Mendez 50' (pen.), 64'; Lozanovski 63', 65'; Milicic 71'; Tome 81', 83'	Report		Stadium: Hindmarsh Stadium; Referee: Derek Rugg (New Zealand)

21 January 1996	New Zealand	0–5	Australia	Adelaide, Australia
		Report	Spiteri 1', 16', 55'; Lozanovski 20'; Viduka 57'	Stadium: Hindmarsh Stadium; Referee: Intaz Shah (Fiji)

25 January 1996	Vanuatu	0–12	Australia	Adelaide, Australia
		Report	Bilokapic 2', 56'; Milicic 6', 31'; Bacak 21', 39', 44'; Lozanovski 29', 79', 88'; Tome 61'; Tiatto 72'	Stadium: Hindmarsh Stadium; Referee: Derek Rugg (New Zealand)

27 January 1996	Australia	7–0	Solomon Islands	Adelaide, Australia
	Moore 14'; Spiteri 30', 48'; Mendez 40' (pen.), 90'; Viduka 42'; Casserly 51'	Report		Stadium: Hindmarsh Stadium

29 January 1996	Fiji	0–5	Australia	Adelaide, Australia
		Report	Aloisi 3'; Viduka 58'; Tiatto 69'; Lozanovski 80'; Tome 89'	Stadium: Hindmarsh Stadium; Referee: Massino Ravieno (Tahiti)

31 January 1996	Australia	0–1	New Zealand	Adelaide, Australia
		Report	Elliott 55'	Stadium: Hindmarsh Stadium; Referee: Massino Ravieno (Tahiti)

===== 1996 Summer Olympics qualification =====
====== Inter-continental play-off ======
26 May 1996	Canada	2–2	Australia	Edmonton, Canada
	Xausa 21', 88'	Report	Viduka 53', 59'	Stadium: Commonwealth Stadium; Attendance: 13,049; Referee: Kim Milton Nielsen (Denmark)

2 June 1996	Australia	5–0 (7–2 agg.)	Canada	Sydney, Australia
	Foxe 16'; Lozanovski 58'; Viduka 82'; Agostino 85'; Muscat 87'	Report		Stadium: Sydney Football Stadium; Attendance: 25,809; Referee: Ali Bujsaim (United Arab Emirates)

=== Men's under-17 ===
==== Results and fixtures ====
===== 1995 FIFA U-17 World Championship =====
====== Group C ======
Pos	Team	Pld	W	D	L	GF	GA	GD	Pts	Qualification
1	Nigeria	3	2	1	0	5	2	+3	7	Advance to knockout stage
2	Australia	3	1	1	1	5	4	+1	4	Advance to knockout stage
3	Spain	3	1	1	1	4	4	0	4	
4	Qatar	3	0	1	2	1	5	−4	1	

Source: RSSSF

4 August 1995	Australia	2–2	Spain	Riobamba, Ecuador
14:15	Allsopp 16', 73'	Report	Duarte 55' (pen.); Mista 73'	Stadium: Estadio Olímpico de Riobamba; Attendance: 20,000; Referee: Ramesh Ramdhan (Trinidad and Tobago)

6 August 1995	Nigeria	2–0	Australia	Riobamba, Ecuador
12:00	Anyamkyegh 59'; Obiorah 90+3'	Report		Stadium: Estadio Olímpico de Riobamba; Attendance: 10,000; Referee: Roger Zambrano (Ecuador)

9 August 1995	Qatar	0–3	Australia	Riobamba, Ecuador
12:00		Report	Kewell 43' (pen.); Allsopp 48', 56'	Stadium: Estadio Olímpico de Riobamba; Attendance: 10,000; Referee: Hartmut Strampe (Germany)

====== Knockout stage ======
13 August 1995 Quarter-finals	Brazil	3–1	Australia	Portoviejo, Ecuador
14:00	Rodrigo 14'; Kléber 65'; Antônio 75'	Report	Allsopp 32'	Stadium: Estadio Reales Tamarindos; Attendance: 10,000; Referee: Antonio Maruffo (Mexico)

== Domestic soccer ==
=== National Soccer League ===
Pos	Team	Pld	W	D	L	GF	GA	GD	Pts	Qualification
1	Marconi Fairfield	33	17	9	7	58	35	+23	60	Qualification for the Finals series
2	Melbourne Knights (C)	33	17	8	8	50	28	+22	59	Qualification for the Finals series
3	UTS Olympic	33	17	8	8	55	41	+14	59	Qualification for the Finals series
4	Brisbane Strikers	33	17	6	10	54	35	+19	57	Qualification for the Finals series
5	Adelaide City	33	15	9	9	65	40	+25	54	Qualification for the Finals series
6	Sydney United	33	14	12	7	47	33	+14	54	Qualification for the Finals series
7	West Adelaide	33	16	5	12	49	43	+6	53	
8	South Melbourne	33	14	4	15	50	56	−6	46	
9	Canberra Cosmos	33	8	11	14	48	61	−13	35	
10	Morwell Falcons	33	9	8	16	35	65	−30	35	
11	Wollongong City	33	5	5	23	31	63	−32	20	
12	Newcastle Breakers	33	4	5	24	35	77	−42	17	

Updated to match(es) played on unknown. Source: rsssf.com
Rules for classification: 1) points; 2) goal difference; 3) number of goals scored.
(C) Champions

=== NSL Cup ===
==== Final ====
27 January 1996

South Melbourne	3–1	Newcastle Breakers
Coveny 22', 74'; Panopoulos 35' (pen.)	Report	Hickman 49'

Bob Jane Stadium, Melbourne
Attendance: 5,000
Referee: Simon Micallef
