= Pernille Andersen =

Danish-born New Zealand footballer

Personal information
- Full name: Pernille S. Andersen
- Date of birth: 6 November 1972 (age 53)
- Place of birth: Aarhus, Denmark
- Position: Forward

International career
Years	Team	Apps	(Gls)
1988–1989	Denmark U17	5	(0)
1991	Denmark U21	3	(1)
1998	New Zealand	7	(15)

Pernille S. Andersen (born 6 November 1972) is a former association football player who represented New Zealand at international level.

Andersen made her Football Ferns debut in a 1–4 loss to Germany on 26 May 1998, and finished her international career with seven caps and 15 goals to her credit, including back to back double hat-tricks as New Zealand demolished Samoa 21–0 and Fiji 14–0.

Aarhus-born Andersen, known as "Skalle", played club football in Denmark for Rolsted, B1913, B1919, OB Odense and HEI and represented the Danish national teams at youth level. She also had a spell in England with Millwall Lionesses before arriving in New Zealand in 1995.

== International goals ==
Scores and results list New Zealand's goal tally first.

No.	Date	Venue	Opponent	Score	Result	Competition
1.	9 October 1998	Auckland, New Zealand	Samoa	1–0	21–0	1998 OFC Women's Championship
2.	9 October 1998	Auckland, New Zealand	Samoa	2–0	21–0	1998 OFC Women's Championship
3.	9 October 1998	Auckland, New Zealand	Samoa	5–0	21–0	1998 OFC Women's Championship
4.	9 October 1998	Auckland, New Zealand	Samoa	7–0	21–0	1998 OFC Women's Championship
5.	9 October 1998	Auckland, New Zealand	Samoa	9–0	21–0	1998 OFC Women's Championship
6.	9 October 1998	Auckland, New Zealand	Samoa	?–0	21–0	1998 OFC Women's Championship
7.	11 October 1998	Auckland, New Zealand	Fiji	1–0	14–0	1998 OFC Women's Championship
8.	11 October 1998	Auckland, New Zealand	Fiji	2–0	14–0	1998 OFC Women's Championship
9.	11 October 1998	Auckland, New Zealand	Fiji	4–0	14–0	1998 OFC Women's Championship
10.	11 October 1998	Auckland, New Zealand	Fiji	9–0	14–0	1998 OFC Women's Championship
11.	11 October 1998	Auckland, New Zealand	Fiji	10–0	14–0	1998 OFC Women's Championship
12.	11 October 1998	Auckland, New Zealand	Fiji	12–0	14–0	1998 OFC Women's Championship
13.	11 October 1998	Auckland, New Zealand	Fiji	13–0	14–0	1998 OFC Women's Championship
14.	15 October 1998	Auckland, New Zealand	Papua New Guinea	1–0	5–0	1998 OFC Women's Championship
15.	15 October 1998	Auckland, New Zealand	Papua New Guinea	5–0	5–0	1998 OFC Women's Championship
