= Larry Mana'o =

American soccer coach

Personal information
- Place of birth: United States

College career
Years	Team	Apps	(Gls)
- Puget Sound

Managerial career
- 2011: American Samoa (women)
- 2015–2018: American Samoa
- 2018–2022: American Samoa (women)

Larry Mana'o is an American soccer coach, who was previously the manager of American Samoa.

== Playing career ==
Mana'o played college soccer for the University of Puget Sound.

== Managerial career ==
Following being assistant to Thomas Rongen, Mana'o took up management of American Samoa.

Mana'o has also managed the American Samoa women's national football team.

== Personal life ==
Mana'o is father to Alma Mana'o, Ava Mana'o and Severina Mana'o, all of whom represent the American Samoa women's national team.

== Managerial statistics ==
As of Match played 4 September 2015

Team	From	To	Record				
Team	From	To	G	W	D	L	Win %
American Samoa	2015	2018	4	2	0	2	50.00
