= Amanda Cromwell =

American soccer player and coach (born 1970)

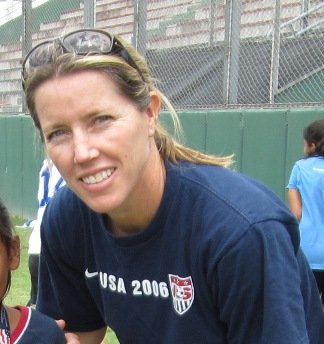
- Cromwell in 2012

Personal information
- Full name: Amanda Caryl Cromwell
- Date of birth: June 15, 1970 (age 56)
- Place of birth: Washington, D.C., U.S.
- Height: 5 ft 7 in (1.70 m)
- Positions: Defender; midfielder

College career
| Years | Team | Apps | (Gls) |
| 1988–1991 | Virginia Cavaliers | | (35) |

Senior career*
| Years | Team | Apps | (Gls) |
| 1997 | Orlando Lions | | |
| 1998 | Maryland Pride | | |
| 1999 | Tampa Bay Extreme | | |
| 2000 | Charlotte Eagles | | |
| 2001 | Washington Freedom | | |
| 2002 | Atlanta Beat | | |
| 2003 | San Jose CyberRays | | |

International career
| 1991–1998 | United States | 55 | (1) |

Managerial career
- 1992–1994: Virginia Cavaliers (assistant)
- 1996–1997: UMBC Retrievers
- 1999–2012: UCF Knights
- 2013–2021: UCLA Bruins
- 2021–2022: Orlando Pride
- 2025–: American Samoa
Medal record
Representing United States
Olympic Games
| Gold medal – first place | 1996 |
FIFA Women's World Cup
| Third place | 1995 |
- * Club domestic league appearances and goals

Amanda Caryl Cromwell (born June 15, 1970) is an American professional soccer coach who most recently managed the Orlando Pride in the National Women's Soccer League.

Cromwell played for the Virginia Cavaliers from 1988 to 1992, where she captained the team to the 1991 NCAA Final Four. From 1991 to 1998, she was a member of the United States women's national soccer team, which earned third place in the 1995 FIFA Women's World Cup, and the gold medal at the 1996 Summer Olympics. After departing the national team, Cromwell played for the Maryland Pride, Tampa Bay Xtreme, Charlotte Eagles, Washington Freedom, Atlanta Beat and San Jose CyberRays.

Cromwell was previously the coach at the University of Central Florida from 1999 to 2013, where she won five tournaments and eight regular season championships. UCF made 11 NCAA Tournaments under her watch. She was later head coach of the UCLA Bruins women's soccer team for nine seasons.

From 2002 to 2006, Cromwell served as a member of the President's Council on Physical Fitness and Sports, after being appointed by President George W. Bush.

== Early life ==
Cromwell was born in Washington, D.C., on June 15, 1970. As a freshman in 1988, she was named Soccer America's Freshman of the Year and the Cavalier's Rookie of the Year. She graduated in 1988 from Annandale High School in Annandale, Virginia, where she won a state championship and four district titles. During her tenure with the Virginia Cavaliers, Cromwell helped lead the team as captain to the Final Four in 1991. In 1992, she graduated from the University of Virginia with a bachelor's degree in biology. That season, she finished as a finalist for the Hermann Trophy and Women's Collegiate Soccer Player of the Year.

She was a four-time All-Atlantic Coast Conference (ACC) selection, and three-time All-South Region team selection. Cromwell was also a two-time NSCAA All-American and a Soccer America MVP, and was voted the team's MVP in 1989. Cromwell was named to the ACC 50th Anniversary Team.

== Professional career ==
In 1994, she played for the Hammarby Soccer Club in Sweden, making eight appearances under player-coach Pia Sundhage. Upon graduation from Virginia, Cromwell joined the United States women's national soccer team. While on the team, Cromwell earned a bronze medal during the 1995 FIFA Women's World Cup in Sweden, and a gold medal during the 1996 Summer Olympics. During her time on the national team, she earned 55 caps.

Between her tenure on the national team, and after she left in 1998, Cromwell played professionally in the United States and abroad. Between 1997 and 2003, she played for the Maryland Pride, Tampa Bay Xtreme, Charlotte Eagles, Washington Freedom, Atlanta Beat and San Jose CyberRays.

In 2010, Cromwell was inducted into the Virginia-DC Soccer Hall of Fame.

== Coaching career ==
=== UMBC Retrievers ===
Cromwell served as an assistant coach at her alma mater from 1992 to 1994, before becoming the head coach of the University of Maryland, Baltimore County (UMBC) Retrievers women's team from 1996 to 1997.

=== UCF Knights ===
In 1999, Cromwell became the head coach of the UCF Knights women's soccer program. After taking the helm, she helped resurrect a program that only reached the NCAA Tournament twice in the previous ten years. She led the Knights for 13 seasons, with only 1 losing record, and led the team to 10 Tournament appearances, including five straight through to 2011.

=== UCLA Bruins ===
In 2013, Cromwell became the head coach of the UCLA Bruins women's soccer program. Eight months after becoming coach, she led her team to the program's first-ever NCAA Championship. Cromwell's 2013 Bruins finished the season with a 22–1–3 record, and went unbeaten over their last 21 games. They gave up just one goal during the NCAA Tournament and only eight goals all season, leading the nation in goals against average (0.296). In addition to winning the national championship, the team won the Pac-12 title and tied the school record for most victories in a season. Cromwell was named Soccer America's Coach of the Year, the first-such honor for a UCLA women's soccer coach.

=== Orlando Pride ===
On December 7, 2021, Cromwell was announced as head coach of National Women's Soccer League (NWSL) team Orlando Pride, her first head coaching position at a professional club. In becoming the Pride's third permanent head coach, Cromwell had to divest her investment stake in 2022 expansion side Angel City FC.

On June 7, 2022, it was announced that Cromwell, along with her assistant coach Sam Greene, had been placed on administrative leave on the recommendation of the NWSL and NWSL Players Association joint investigation team, following alleged "retaliation in violation of the NWSL Policy to Prevent and Eliminate Workplace Discrimination, Harassment, and Bullying." Her contract was officially terminated on October 10, 2022, after the league found both Cromwell and Greene had engaged in retaliatory conduct.

== Sports diplomacy ==
Cromwell has also been an active participant in the Sports Diplomacy Sports Envoy program for the U.S. Department of State. In this function, she has traveled to Argentina, Bolivia, Costa Rica, Germany, and Morocco, where she worked with Lauren Gregg, Jay Miller, Tracy Noonan, and Briana Scurry to conduct basketball clinics and events that have reached in excess of 2650 youth and women from underserved areas. In so doing, Cromwell helped contribute to Sports Diplomacy's mission to empower girls and women through sport while promoting youth empowerment.

== Personal life ==
Cromwell is married to Megan Fish, reporter and producer for Angel City FC. The pair first met when Fish joined the UCF Knights as a freshman in 2011 while Cromwell was head coach. They married in December 2021 in a small ceremony in Hawaii.

== Career statistics ==
=== International goals ===
United States score listed first.

| No. | Date | Venue | Opponent | Result | Competition |
|---|---|---|---|---|---|
| 1 | August 17, 1994 | Complexe sportif Claude-Robillard, Montreal, Canada | Trinidad and Tobago | 11–1 | 1994 CONCACAF Women's Championship |

=== Head coaching record ===
As of October 10, 2022

Head coaching record by team and tenure
| Team | From | To | Record | | | | |
| Team | From | To | P | W | L | T | Win % |
|---|---|---|---|---|---|---|---|
| UMBC Retrievers | 1996 | 1997 | 36 | 20 | 15 | 1 | 55.56 |
| UCF Knights | 1999 | April 12, 2013 | 313 | 204 | 83 | 26 | 65.18 |
| UCLA Bruins | April 12, 2013 | December 4, 2021 | 199 | 149 | 30 | 20 | 74.87 |
| Orlando Pride | December 7, 2021 | October 10, 2022 (Note: Suspended from June 7, 2022.) | 13 | 2 | 7 | 4 | 15.38 |
| Career totals | | | 561 | 375 | 135 | 51 | 66.84 |

== Honors ==
=== Player ===
United States

- FIFA Women's World Cup third-place: 1995
- Olympic Gold Medal: 1996

=== Head coach ===
UCF Knights

- Atlantic Sun Conference regular season (3): 1999, 2001, 2002
- Atlantic Sun Conference Tournament (4): 1999, 2001, 2002, 2003
- Conference USA regular season (4): 2005, 2007, 2009, 2010
- Conference USA Tournament (1): 2012

UCLA Bruins

- Pac-12 Conference regular season (4): 2013, 2014, 2020, 2021
- NCAA Division I Women's Soccer Championship (1): 2013

Individual

- Soccer America Women's Coach of the Year: 2014
- Pac-12 Conference Coach of the Year: 2020
