= Alicia Ferguson =

Australian soccer player

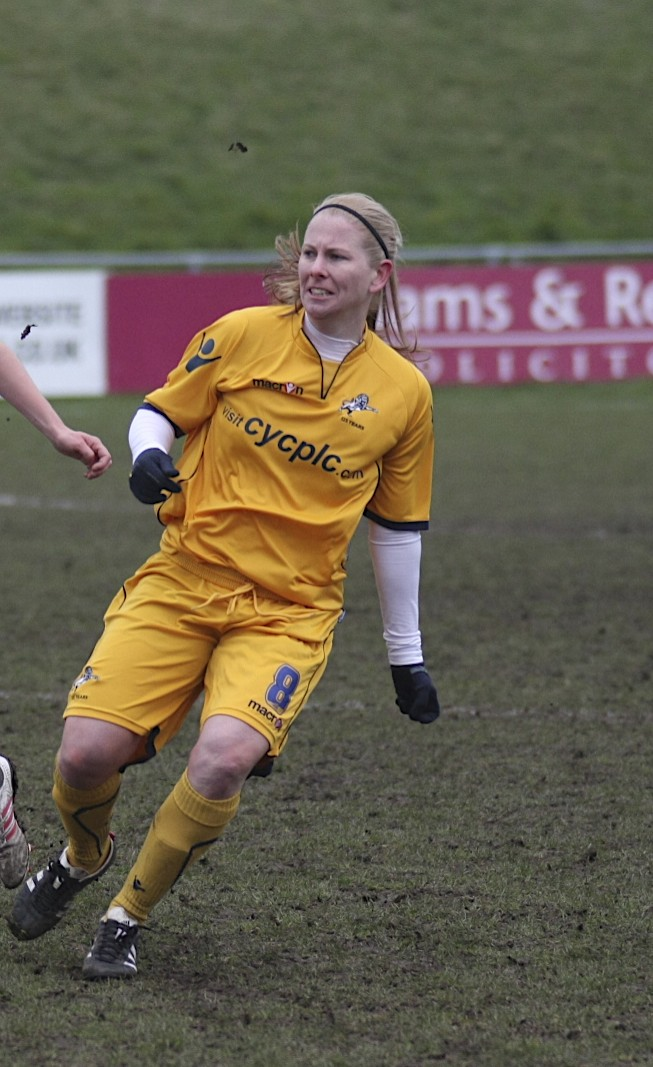
- Ferguson playing for Millwall Lionesses in 2013

Personal information
- Full name: Alicia Ann Ferguson
- Date of birth: 31 October 1981 (age 45)
- Place of birth: Brisbane, Australia
- Height: 1.65 m (5 ft 5 in)
- Positions: Forward; midfielder

Youth career
- Stratford United (Cairns)
- Saints (Cairns)
- Mt Gravatt SC

Senior career*
Years	Team	Apps	(Gls)
1996–2007	Queensland Sting		
2008–2009	Brisbane Roar	10	(3)
2012–2013	Millwall Lionesses		

International career^{‡}
1997–2007	Australia	66	(6)
- * Club domestic league appearances and goals as of 10 September 2014 ‡ National team caps and goals as of 10 September 2014

Alicia Ann "Eesh" Ferguson (born 31 October 1981) is an Australian soccer player who represented the Australia women's national soccer team at the 1999 and 2007 editions of the FIFA Women's World Cup. Ferguson debuted for Australia at the age of 15 years during the Matildas' European tour in August 1997. Initially she played as a forward and scored four times in Australia's 1998 OFC Women's Championship victory. After a period of injury she subsequently became one of Australia's most solid midfielders. At club level Ferguson enjoyed success with Queensland Sting in the Women's National Soccer League and Brisbane Roar in the W-League. In 2012–13 she played for Millwall Lionesses of the English FA Women's Premier League.

Since her playing retirement, Ferguson has worked as a football pundit and columnist. She began her television career working for the ABC, primarily on their W-League and Matildas coverage, then moved to ESPN as a studio commentator for the 2011 FIFA Women's World Cup.

== Club career ==
Ferguson played for Queensland Sting in the Women's National Soccer League, but the league folded in 2004.

When the W-League started in 2008, Ferguson made a comeback with Brisbane Roar. She had spent a year out of football but said: "It's that plain and simple, I missed playing." She scored three goals in 10 appearances but missed the Roar's Grand Final victory after suffering an anterior cruciate ligament injury in the semi-final win over Sydney FC.

After relocating to England for work reasons, Ferguson made another playing comeback with Millwall Lionesses of the FA Women's Premier League Southern Division. She made her league debut in September 2012, assisting the first goal in a 2–0 home win over QPR.

== International career ==
National team coach Greg Brown brought 15-year-old Ferguson on the Matildas' tour of Europe in August 1997. She made her senior debut in the tour's second match; a 4–0 win over Hungary in Csákvár. In 1998 she accepted a residential scholarship on the Australian Institute of Sport Football Program, ahead of the following year's World Cup in the United States. At 16 she was the youngest amongst that year's inaugural intake of female players. She relocated from Brisbane to Canberra to take up her place.

She was included in the squad for the 1998 OFC Women's Championship, which served as the qualifying tournament for the 1999 FIFA Women's World Cup. She scored two goals in each of Australia's lopsided wins over American Samoa and Fiji. She was not in the team which beat rivals New Zealand 3–1 in the final to secure Australia's qualification.

In a warm up match before the final tournament, against Canada in Toronto, Ferguson scored the Matildas' first goal in a 3–1 win. At the World Cup Ferguson did not feature in the first two matches, a 1–1 draw with Ghana and a 3–1 defeat by Sweden. She started the third match against China, but was sent off in the second minute, for a late, high tackle on Bai Jie. Ferguson later admitted that she had been daunted by the occasion.

Twelve members of the Matildas controversially posed for a nude calendar in October 1999. At 17, Ferguson was the youngest participant. She remained happy with the final product and the original photograph was framed and proudly displayed at her parents' home in Brisbane. Ferguson was selected to take part in the 2000 Sydney Olympics and was proud to walk out at the opening ceremony in her home country.

Ferguson dropped out of the national team in 2002 after a knee reconstruction operation. She missed the 2003 FIFA Women's World Cup and the 2004 Athens Olympics. In 2005 incoming coach Tom Sermanni recalled Ferguson, who had changed from a forward into a defensive midfielder. She made an important late goal line clearance as Australia held the United States to a 0–0 draw in October 2005.

During the 2006 AFC Women's Asian Cup Ferguson stood in as captain of the Matildas. Her goal in a 5–0 win over Thailand resulted in a celebratory jig. Australia lost the final to China in a penalty shootout, despite Ferguson converting her kick. Second place secured qualification for the 2007 FIFA Women's World Cup.

After being named in the squad, Ferguson said that the 2007 team were better and more experienced than the team she had played in at the 1999 tournament. She hoped to emulate the male Australia team, who had reached the knockout stage of their 2006 World Cup. She also hoped that success in the tournament would lead to the reformation of a national domestic league. Ferguson featured in all three group games, but did not take part in the 3–2 quarter-final defeat to Brazil.

=== International goals ===
Results list Australia's goal tally first.

#	Date	Venue	Opponent	Result	Competition	Scored
2	9 October 1998	Mount Smart Stadium, Auckland	American Samoa	21–0	1998 OFC Women's Championship	2
4	15 October 1998	Mount Smart Stadium, Auckland	Fiji	17–0	1998 OFC Women's Championship	2
5	9 June 1999	Centennial Park Stadium, Toronto	Canada	3–1	Friendly	1
6	24 July 2006	Marden Sports Complex, Adelaide	Thailand	5–0	2006 AFC Women's Asian Cup	1

== Honours ==
=== Club ===
Queensland Sting

- Women's National Soccer League (4): 1996–97, 2000, 2002, 2004
- Australian National Women's Football Tournament (1): 2005

Brisbane Roar

- W-League (1): 2008–09

=== International ===
Australia

- OFC Women's Championship (1): 1998

== Non-playing career ==
In 2013 Ferguson started working for television production company Sunset + Vine, who supplied the BBC's coverage of UEFA Women's Euro 2013 and BT Sport's FA WSL coverage. During her second spell in the national team Ferguson held jobs with both the Australian Cricket Academy and the Australian Institute of Sport.
