= Teretia Teinaki =

Cook Islands footballer (born 2002)

Teretia Teinaki (born 23 January 2002) is a Cook Islands footballer who plays as a defender. She has represented the Cook Islands internationally as part of the Cook Islands women's national football team. In 2021 she was selected as one of the Oceania Football Confederation's women's football ambassadors.

== Career ==
Teinaki was born on Rarotonga in the Cook Islands and started playing football at the age of 10 whilst at school. After initially starting playing for Takuvaine F.C., she joined Tupapa Maraerenga F.C. in 2018. When she moved to New Zealand to study at Auckland University of Technology, she joined Manukau United FC.

In 2017 she was selected for the Cook Islands women's national under-17 football team for the 2017 OFC U-16 Women's Championship. She was selected for the Cook Islands women's national football team as part of the team for the 2018 OFC Women's Nations Cup. She was selected again for the 2019 Pacific Games squad, and for the team for the 2022 OFC Women's Nations Cup.

In 2024, she joined the Cook Islands Football Association as an administrator to work in developing women's football throughout the territory. In 2025, Teinaki alongside the CIFA's grassroots development officer, Penina Katuke, were selected to represent the Cook Islands in order to study for the Oceanian Football Confederation's Player Development Diploma Programme. Teinaki did this but setting up and running the Cook Islands' first futsal league as well as aiming to start their first walking futsal league.
