= Manao =

Manao may refer to:

- Manao language
- Manao Kagawa

== See also ==
- Mana'o (disambiguation)
- Manaus
