= Cook Islands women's national football team =

Women's national association football team representing Cook Islands

Cook Islands
- Association: Cook Islands Football Association
- Confederation: OFC (Oceania)
- Head coach: Rhys Ruka
- Most caps: Elizabeth Harmon (18)
- FIFA code: COK
First colours	Second colours

FIFA ranking
- Current: 131 ▲1 (16 June 2026)
- Highest: 91 (July 2003)
- Lowest: 132 (April 2026)

First international
- Cook Islands 1–5 Papua New Guinea (Canberra, Australia; 5 April 2003)

Biggest win
- Cook Islands 3–0 American Samoa (Honiara, Solomon Islands; 23 November 2023); Cook Islands 3–0 Afghan Women United (Afghanistan) (Auckland, New Zealand; 8 June 2026)

Biggest defeat
- Australia 11–0 Cook Islands (Canberra, Australia; 7 April 2003); Cook Islands 0–11 New Zealand (Kokopo, Papua New Guinea; 29 October 2014)

World Cup
- Appearances: 0

OFC Women's Nations Cup
- Appearances: 6 (first in 2003)
- Best result: Third place (2010, 2014)

The Cook Islands women's national football team represents the Cook Islands in international women's football. The team is controlled by the Cook Islands Football Association. With a population of around 18,000 people, it remains one of the smallest FIFA teams.

Cook Islands has never qualified for a FIFA Women's World Cup, but has entered the OFC Women's Nations Cup five times, in 2003, 2010, 2014, 2018, 2022, and 2025. In the OFC Women's Nations Cup in 2022, they lost to Fiji in the quarter-final.

In 2025, they participated in the 2025 OFC Women's Nations Cup, losing 0-1 to Tonga in the seventh-place match. Later in November 2025, they participated in the first round of the OFC qualification for the 2027 FIFA Women's World Cup as one of the four lowest-ranked national teams in the OFC confederation. In the first round, they beat Tahiti 1-0 in front of their home crowd, claiming their first competitive win since 2019. But in the second match of the first round, in which the winner would progress to the second round of qualification, Cook Islands lost 0-4 to American Samoa.

As of April 2026, Cook Islands is on the 132nd position of the FIFA Women's World Ranking.

== Results and fixtures ==
The following is a list of match results in the last 12 months, as well as any future matches that have been scheduled.

Legend

Win Draw Lose Void or postponed Fixture

=== 2025 ===
28 November 2025 2027 FIFA Women's World Cup OFC Qualification	Tahiti	0–1	Cook Islands	Avarua, Cook Islands
15:00 UTC−10		Report (OFC)	Rouru 79'	Stadium: Cook Islands Football Academy (CIFA) Field (Field 1); Attendance: 300; Referee: Shama Maemae (Solomon Islands)

1 December 2025 2027 FIFA Women's World Cup OFC Qualification	American Samoa	4–0	Cook Islands	Avarua, Cook Islands
12:00 UTC−10	Patea 22'; Mana'o 36'; Al. Fuamatu-Ma'afala 44'; Summers 49'	Report (FIFA); Report (OFC)		Stadium: Cook Islands Football Academy (CIFA) Field (Field 1); Attendance: 100; Referee: Anna-Marie Keighley (New Zealand)

=== 2026 ===
2 June Friendly	Māori	2–0	Cook Islands	Papakura, New Zealand
16:00 UTC+12	Brazier 45'; Gage 62'			Stadium: McLennan Park

4 June Friendly	Cook Islands	1–0	(Afghanistan) Afghan Women United	Auckland, New Zealand
	(?) Teupoko Tuariki	Report

8 June Friendly	Cook Islands	3–0	(Afghanistan) Afghan Women United	Auckland, New Zealand
		Report

== Coaching staff ==
As of 30 November 2025

Position	Name
Head coach	(Cook Islands) Rhys Ruka
Assistant coach	(Cook Islands) Mii Piri-Savage
Team Manager	(Cook Islands) Tokoa Harmon
Assistant Team Manager	(Cook Islands) Aramoana Mataroa
Goalkeepers Coach	(Cook Islands) Rianna Pepe
Physiotherapist	(Cook Islands) Jana Whittia

=== Manager history ===
- (Cook Islands) Rhys Ruka (2025-current)
- (Cook Islands) Angela Wallbank (202?-2025)
- (Cook Islands) Tuka Tisam (202?-202?)
- (Australia) Gary Phillips (202?-20??)

== Players ==
=== Current squad ===
- The following players were named to the squad for the 2027 FIFA Women's World Cup OFC Qualification between 28 November and 1 December 2025.

Squad and ages as of 28 November 2025, the opening matchday of the 2027 FIFA Women's World Cup OFC Qualification.

No.	Pos.	Player	Date of birth (age)	Club
1	GK	Kimberly Uini	23 August 2006 (aged 19)	(Cook Islands Football Association) Matavera-Ngatangiia
20	GK	Kimberley Philip		(Cook Islands Football Association) Puaikura
22	GK	Rianna Pepe	10 October 1998 (aged 27)	(Cook Islands Football Association) Tupapa Maraerenga
2	DF	Claudean Robati (Captain)	6 December 1988 (aged 36)	(Cook Islands Football Association) Tupapa Maraerenga
4	DF	Daniella Poila		(Football Australia) North Lakes United
5	DF	Ally Toailoa (Vice-captain)	19 April 1999 (aged 26)	(New Zealand Football) Papakura City
7	DF	Tepaeru Paulina Ngaroi	9 August 2003 (aged 22)	(Cook Islands Football Association) Avatiu
12	DF	Natasha Dean		(Cook Islands Football Association) Puaikura
14	DF	Christina Areai	18 May 2001 (aged 24)	(Cook Islands Football Association) Tupapa Maraerenga
16	DF	Mareta Brothers	9 April 2003 (aged 22)	(New Zealand Football) Manukau United
19	DF	Tanga Morris	28 November 1996 (aged 29)	(Cook Islands Football Association) Matavera-Ngatangiia
3	MF	Penina Katuke	19 November 2005 (aged 20)	(Cook Islands Football Association) Titikaveka
6	MF	Kayleena Kermode	8 February 1999 (aged 26)	(Cook Islands Football Association) Tupapa Maraerenga
10	MF	Teretia Teinaki	23 January 2002 (aged 23)	(Cook Islands Football Association) Avatiu
13	MF	Tineke De Jong	26 May 2002 (aged 23)	(New Zealand Football) Manukau United
17	MF	Deja Pareta	19 June 2004 (aged 21)	(New Zealand Football) Hibiscus Coast
21	MF	Tayla Jeanne Hetherington	27 January 1994 (aged 31)	(New Zealand Football) Manukau United
23	MF	Maureen Fitzpatrick	8 December 2001 (aged 23)	(New Zealand Football) Franklin United
8	FW	Te Upoko Tuariki	24 February 2006 (aged 19)	(Cook Islands Football Association) Puaikura
9	FW	Victoria Fatiaki		(Cook Islands Football Association) Puaikura
11	FW	Tearoa Rouru	6 February 2005 (aged 20)	(Cook Islands Football Association) Matavera-Ngatangiia
15	FW	Lyric Davison	11 April 2002 (aged 23)	(New Zealand Football) Ellerslie
18	FW	Gisele Rea		(Cook Islands Football Association) Titikaveka

=== Recent call-ups ===
The following players have been called up for the team in the last 12 months.

Pos.	Player	Date of birth (age)	Caps	Goals	Club	Latest call-up
GK	Kimberley Philip				(Cook Islands) Puaikura	2027 FIFA Women's World Cup OFC Qualification
DF	Daniella Poila				(Australia) North Lakes United	2027 FIFA Women's World Cup OFC Qualification
FW	Victoria Fatiaki				(Cook Islands) Puaikura	2027 FIFA Women's World Cup OFC Qualification
DF	Natasha Dean				(Cook Islands) Puaikura	2027 FIFA Women's World Cup OFC Qualification
FW	Gisele Rea				(Cook Islands) Titikaveka	2027 FIFA Women's World Cup OFC Qualification

== Competitive record ==
=== FIFA Women's World Cup ===
FIFA Women's World Cup
Year	Result	Matches	Wins	Draws	Losses	GF	GA
(China) 1991	Did not enter						
(Sweden) 1995	Did not enter						
(United States) 1999	Did not enter						
(United States) 2003	Did not qualify						
(China) 2007	Did not enter						
(Germany) 2011	Did not qualify						
(Canada) 2015	Did not qualify						
(France) 2019	Did not qualify						
(Australia) (New Zealand) 2023	Did not qualify						
(Brazil) 2027	To be determined						
(Costa Rica) (Jamaica) (Mexico) (United States) 2031	To be determined						
(United Kingdom) 2035	To be determined						
Total	0/10	0	0	0	0	0	0

=== OFC Women's Nations Cup ===
OFC Women's Nations Cup
Year	Result	GP	W	D*	L	GF	GA	GD
(New Caledonia) 1983	Did not enter							
(New Zealand) 1986	Did not enter							
(Australia) 1989	Did not enter							
(Australia) 1991	Did not enter							
(Papua New Guinea) 1994	Did not enter							
(New Zealand) 1998	Did not enter							
(Australia) 2003	Group stage	4	0	0	4	1	26	−25
(Papua New Guinea) 2007	Did not enter							
(New Zealand) 2010	Third place	5	3	0	2	5	11	−6
(Papua New Guinea) 2014	Third place	3	0	1	2	2	16	−14
(New Caledonia) 2018	Group stage	3	0	0	3	0	10	−10
(Fiji) 2022	Quarter-finals	3	0	1	2	1	4	−3
Total	Third place	18	3	2	13	9	67	−58

*Draws include knockout matches decided on penalty kicks.

=== Pacific Games ===
Pacific Games
Year	Result	Pld	W	D	L	GF	GA	GD
(Fiji) 2003	Did not enter							
(Samoa) 2007	Group Stage	4	0	2	2	4	10	−6
(New Caledonia) 2011	Group Stage	3	1	1	1	2	2	0
(Papua New Guinea) 2015	Third Place	4	1	1	2	4	8	−4
(Samoa) 2019	Fourth Place	5	3	0	2	8	10	−2
Total	Third Place	16	5	4	7	18	30	−12

== See also ==
- Sport in the Cook Islands
  - Football in the Cook Islands
    - Women's football in the Cook Islands
- Cook Islands national football team
- Cook Islands national under-20 football team
- Cook Islands national under-17 football team
- Cook Islands women's national under-17 football team
