= Jennifer Carlisle =

New Zealand footballer

Personal information
- Full name: Jennifer Carlisle
- Date of birth: 6 November 1971 (age 54)

International career
Years	Team	Apps	(Gls)
1997–1998	New Zealand	5	(1)

Jennifer Carlisle (born 6 November 1971) is a former association football player who represented New Zealand at international level.

Carlisle made her Football Ferns début in a 1–3 loss to China on 21 November 1997, and finished her international career with five caps and one goal to her credit.
