= Sacha Haskell =

New Zealand footballer (born 1969)

Personal information
- Full name: Sacha Francesca Haskell
- Date of birth: 30 June 1969 (age 57)
- Place of birth: New Zealand
- Position: Midfielder

Senior career*
Years	Team	Apps	(Gls)
1987-1991	Eden		(8)
1992–1993	Miramar Rangers		
1994–1996	Petone		
1997–1998	Marist Wellington		
1999	Three Kings United		(1)
Total			(9)

International career
1994–1998	New Zealand	16	(8)
- * Club domestic league appearances and goals

Sacha Haskell (born 30 June 1969) is an association football player who represented New Zealand at international level.

== Professional career ==
Haskell (also known as "The Enforcer") made her Football Ferns debut in a 0–1 loss to Bulgaria on 24 August 1997, and finished her international career with 16 caps and 8 goals to her credit including goals against World Cup Winners Germany.

She also was third ranked junior national representative in tennis and played representative cricket for Auckland and Wellington.

Haskell was one of the first women to be selected as a member of the special armed force unit of the New Zealand Police, the Armed Offenders Squad (AOS) from 1995 to 1999 and held the rank of detective. She featured in the television series The Line of Fire.

== Political activism ==
In 2026, Haskell became a candidate for the Opportunity Party in the Tāmaki electorate. She was ranked 31st on the Opportunity party list.

On 7 November, Haskell came fifth place in Tāmaki based on preliminary results, gaining 1,002 votes. Due to her low ranking on Opportunity party list, Haskell was not elected into Parliament via that method.

== Club honours ==
- Northern Premier Women's League champions 1987, 1991, 1999
- Auckland Premier Women's Knockout Shield winners 1987, 1991
- Auckland Premier Women's Champion-of-Champions winners 1987, 1991
- Central Premier Women's League champions 1992, 1993, 1994, 1995, 1996
- Kelly Cup winners 1994
- WSANZ Knockout Cup winners 1999
