= Alma Mana'o =

American Samoan footballer (born 1994)

Personal information
- Date of birth: 22 July 1994 (age 32)
- Place of birth: Woodinville, Washington, United States
- Height: 5 ft 3 in (1.60 m)
- Position: Midfielder

College career
Years	Team	Apps	(Gls)
2012	Academy of Art		
2014–2015	Everett CC		
2017–2018	Queens Knights		

International career^{‡}
2011–	American Samoa	7	(0)
- ‡ National team caps and goals as of 06:32, 30 August 2018 (UTC)

Alma Mana'o (born 22 July 1994) is an American Samoan women's footballer based in King County, Washington. She holds the record for the most caps for the American Samoa women's football team. In 2018, Mana'o led the American Samoa team as co-captain in the Oceania Football Confederation Women's Nations Cup qualification tournament in Fiji, the first time in 20 years that the American Samoa women's team was involved in the qualification stages for the World Cup. During her college career, she played as a midfielder for Queens College in New York, and for 2014 NWAC champions Everett Community College in Washington. In 2022, Mana'o helped the Snohomish County FC Steelheads Women win the Northwest Premier League Indoor Championship.

== Early life and family ==
Alma is the oldest of four children born to Larry and Siri Mana'o. Mana'o grew up in Woodinville, Washington, and played at a variety of competitive Washington Youth Soccer Clubs, including Crossfire. She played varsity soccer at Inglemoor High School in Kenmore, Washington, for three years, serving as captain for two years, and received an All-State Honorable Mention.

Alma was one of four Mana'o family members on the 2018 American Samoa squad, together with her sisters Ava and Severina Mana'o, as well as her cousin, Haleigh Mana'o. Her father, Larry Mana'o, coached the team. Out of 18 members of the American Samoa women's team, 10 were based in the United States, and only Alma and her sister Ava, also a midfielder, had represented American Samoa previously. The US-born players qualified for the American Samoa team through their parents or grandparents. Another US-based player to join the squad was Tasha Inong from California State Polytechnic University, Pomona.

Prior to the tournament, 24-year-old Alma Mana'o told the Associated Press: "Football is in our blood. The whole family plays and that is how I got into football...We all stay in different parts of the world and today we are together because of football and I would say it is true that football brings everyone together." Another article published by the Oceania Football Confederation quoted Mana'o as saying that she regarded the whole team as "one big family", and that she and her sisters made an effort to treat each other, and their father, professionally on the pitch.

== Career ==
Mana'o made her international debut for American Samoa in the 2011 Pacific Games women's football tournament in New Caledonia, which was not an OFC or FIFA-related competition.

On 16 November 2014, Alma Mana'o scored the winning goal for Everett Community College in the Northwestern Athletics Conference (NWAC) Championship final, in the 80th minute, earning the Trojan Women their first-ever title. The Everett Trojans finished the 2014 season 20–2–1. Mana'o went on to play at CUNY Queens College, scoring her first goal for the Queens Knights on 4 September 2017. During her junior year at Queens, she played in 14 out of 17 games, and started four times as a midfielder.

During the 2018 OFC Women's Nations Cup, the American Samoa women were defeated by Solomon Islands 2–0; lost to Vanuatu 1–0; and lost to Fiji 2–0.

On 23 April 2022, Alma Mana'o scored two goals for Snohomish County FC, helping the Steelheads win the Northwest Premier League (NWPL) Indoor Championship final.

== Career statistics ==
As of 30 August 2018

Appearances and goals by national team and year
National team	Year	Apps	Goals
American Samoa	2011	4	0
American Samoa	2018	3	0
Total		7	0

List of international goals scored by Alma Mana'o
No.	Date	Venue	Opponent	Score	Result	Competition
1.	1 December 2025	CIFA Academy Field, Matavera, Cook Islands	Cook Islands	2–0	4–0	2027 FIFA Women's World Cup qualification
