= Katrina Boyd =

Australian soccer player

Personal information
- Full name: Katrina Boyd
- Place of birth: Australia
- Height: 1.76 m (5 ft 9 in)
- Position: Striker

International career
| Years | Team | Apps | (Gls) |
| 1991–2000 | Australia | 28 | |

Katrina Boyd is an Australian retired soccer player. She previously played for the Australia women's national soccer team. Boyd retired from professional football in 2005.

== In popular culture ==
Boyd posed nude with some of her teammates in the controversial "The Matildas: the new fashion in football: 2000 Olympic year calendar" in an effort to increase visibility of the team and raise money for their Olympic Games preparation. Of her experience, Boyd said, "I think it's art. If people want to call it porn, that's their problem. No one could make me feel low or sleazy about this. I feel strong and confident with what I have done with my body." A royalty from the sale of each calendar was used to support the team's 2000 Olympic Games preparation.
