= American Samoa women's national football team =

Women's national association football team representing American Samoa

American Samoa
- Association: Football Federation American Samoa (FFAS)
- Confederation: OFC (Oceania)
- Head coach: Amanda Cromwell
- Captain: Alma Mana'o
- FIFA code: ASA
First colors	Second colors

FIFA ranking
- Current: 121 ▼1 (June 16, 2026)
- Highest: 103 (September 2008)
- Lowest: 153 (August 2025)

First international
- Australia 21–0 American Samoa (Auckland, New Zealand; October 9, 1998)

Biggest win
- American Samoa 4–0 Cook Islands (Matavera, Cook Islands; December 1, 2025)

Biggest defeat
- Australia 21–0 American Samoa (Auckland, New Zealand; October 9, 1998)

Pacific Games
- Appearances: 4 (first in 2007)
- Best result: Preliminary round (2007, 2011, 2019); Ninth place (2023)

OFC Women's Nations Cup
- Appearances: 1 (first in 1998)
- Best result: Group stage (1998)

The American Samoa women's national football team represents the unincorporated and unorganized territory of the United States in Polynesia, American Samoa in international women's international football. The team is governed by the Football Federation American Samoa and competes in OFC (the Oceania Football Confederation).

The team has traditionally been considered the weakest in terms of world ranking and on-field performance, failing to win a single match from its inception until late 2025. It has participated in the OFC Women's Nations Cup once, in 1998, and has competed in four of the six Pacific Games. Outside of these competitions, the team has yet to take part in any major international tournaments.

== History ==
=== Early Struggles ===
American Samoa played its first international matches in 1998, entering the 6th edition of the OFC Women's Championship. On October 9, 1998, the team faced Australia in its first-ever match, suffering a 21–0 defeat (7–0 at halftime). Their second match, though less heavy, ended in a 9–0 loss to Papua New Guinea.

Nine years later, the team competed in the 2007 Pacific Games in Apia, Samoa. Placed in Group A, American Samoa finished last with one draw and three losses. Their first positive result came in a 1–1 draw against the Cook Islands. The team returned for the 2011 edition in Nouméa but failed to win any matches, losing all four group games. They did not participate in the 2015 Pacific Games.

In 2018, two decades after their first OFC Women's Nations Cup appearance, American Samoa entered the qualifying tournament for the 2018 edition. Despite narrowly losing 2–0 and 1–0 in their matches, the team failed to reach the finals. The following year, they returned to the Pacific Games for the 2019 edition. The team lost three matches by nine or more goals, with their only positive result a scoreless draw against the host nation and rival Samoa.

At the 2023 Pacific Games, American Samoa lost all three group-stage matches. Cook Islands withdrew from the placement match, allowing American Samoa to finish in ninth place. Their struggles continued during the 2024 Summer Olympic qualification, where the team conceded 26 goals across three matches.

=== New Era ===
In 2025, after opting out of the OFC Women's Nations Cup, American Samoa returned to competitive international scene in the first round of OFC qualification for the 2027 FIFA Women's World Cup. Under new head coach Amanda Cromwell, the squad underwent a significant overhaul, with the majority of players based in the United States. Despite being the lowest-ranked team in the group, American Samoa stunned Tonga, the highest-ranked nation, with a 3–0 victory, marking the program's first competitive win. They followed this with a 4–0 triumph over the Cook Islands, their largest-ever win, securing a place in the second round of qualification.

== Results and fixtures ==
The following is a list of match results in the last 12 months, as well as any future matches that have been scheduled.

Legend

Win Draw Loss Fixture

=== 2025 ===
November 28 2027 FIFA World Cup qualification	Tonga	0–3	American Samoa	Matavera, Cook Islands
12:00 SST		Report	Drago 45+3', 76'; Tu'ua 90+5'	Stadium: CIFA Academy Field; Attendance: 100; Referee: Beth Rattray (New Zealand)

December 1 2027 FIFA World Cup qualification	American Samoa	4–0	Cook Islands	Matavera, Cook Islands
13:00 SST	Patea 22'; Mana'o 36'; Fuamatu-Ma'afala 44'; Summers 49'	Report		Stadium: CIFA Academy Field; Attendance: 100; Referee: Anna-Marie Keighley (New Zealand)

=== 2026 ===
February 21 Friendly	Fiji	2–1	American Samoa	Ba, Fiji
12:00 SST	Davis 32'; Diyalowai 90+'	Report		Stadium: Govind Park

February 26 2027 FIFA World Cup qualification	Solomon Islands	0–1	American Samoa	Honiara, Solomon Islands
20:00 SST		Report	Fuamatu-Ma'afala 56'	Stadium: National Stadium; Attendance: 300; Referee: Torika Delai (Fiji)

March 1 2027 FIFA World Cup qualification	American Samoa	1–0	Samoa	Honiara, Solomon Islands
15:00 SST	Patea 45+2'	Report		Stadium: National Stadium; Attendance: 150; Referee: Khin Nyein Chan (Myanmar)

March 4 2027 FIFA World Cup qualification	American Samoa	0–3	New Zealand	Honiara, Solomon Islands
15:00 SST		Report	Brown 44' (pen.); Bunge 51'; Riley 71'	Stadium: National Stadium; Attendance: 200; Referee: Mu Mingxin (China PR)

April 11 2027 FIFA World Cup qualification	Papua New Guinea	1–0	American Samoa	Hamilton, New Zealand
12:10 UTC+12	Kalapai 45+1'	Report (FIFA); Report (OFC)		Stadium: FMG Stadium Waikato; Attendance: 481; Referee: Anna-Marie Keighley (New Zealand)

== Head-to-head record ==
As of April 11, 2026

Opponent	GP	W	D	L	GF	GA	GD	First match	Most recent match	Win %
Australia	1	0	0	1	0	21	–21	October 9, 1998		.000
Cook Islands	4	2	1	1	8	4	+4	August 28, 2007	December 1, 2025	.625
Fiji	5	0	0	5	1	28	–27	August 30, 2007	February 21, 2026	.000
New Caledonia	3	0	0	3	0	20	–20	August 31, 2011	November 20, 2023	.000
New Zealand	1	0	0	1	0	3	–3	March 5, 2026		.000
Papua New Guinea	6	0	0	6	0	42	–42	October 11, 1998	February 13, 2024	.000
Samoa	2	1	1	0	1	0	+1	July 10, 2019	March 2, 2026	.750
Solomon Islands	5	1	0	4	2	16	–14	September 1, 2007	February 27, 2026	.200
Tahiti	1	0	0	1	0	1	–4	September 5, 2011		.000
Tonga	2	1	0	1	3	12	–9	July 15, 2019	November 28, 2025	.500
Vanuatu	1	0	0	1	0	1	–1	August 27, 2018		.000
Total	31	5	2	24	15	148	–133	October 9, 1998	April 11, 2026	.194

== Coaching staff ==
As of November 30, 2025

Role	Name	Ref.
Head coach	(United States) Amanda Cromwell	
Assistant coach	(United States) Danielle Hanson	
Goalkeeper coach	(United States) Omar Zeenni	

=== Head coach history ===
Below is the record of each head coach in the national team's history.

Name	Years	Matches	Won	Drawn	Lost	Win %
(N/A) Unknown	1998	2	0	0	2	.000
(American Samoa) Tunoa Lui	2007, 2023	8	1	1	6	.188
(American Samoa) Uinifareti Aliva	2011	4	0	0	4	.000
(American Samoa) Larry Mana'o	2018	3	0	0	3	.000
(American Samoa) Ati Faamau-Samuelu	2019	4	0	1	3	.125
(American Samoa) Rueben Luvu	2024	3	0	0	3	.000
(United States) Amanda Cromwell	2025–present	7	4	0	3	.571
Totals		31	5	2	24	.194

== Players ==
=== Current squad ===
The following 20 players were called up for the 2027 FIFA Women's World Cup qualification Oceania third round against Papua New Guinea

No.	Pos.	Player	Date of birth (age)	Club
1	GK	Ayana Kirisimasi	(aged 19)	(United States Soccer Federation) Fresno Pacific
20	GK	Makena Corcoran	(aged 18)	(United States Soccer Federation) Virginia Military Institute
23	GK	Kira Motuapuaka		
2	DF	Jordynn Koria	(aged 15)	(United States Soccer Federation) Pacific Northwest SC
3	DF	Ma'lia Patolo	(aged 17)	(United States Soccer Federation) MVLA SC
21	DF	Ava Talaeai	(aged 18)	(United States Soccer Federation) Utah Tech Trailblazers
5	DF	Mattyn Summers-Oviatt	(aged 22)	(United States Soccer Federation) BYU Cougars
10	DF	Kobe Teofilo	(aged 16)	(United States Soccer Federation) Beach FC ECNL
19	DF	Anaiyah Tu'ua	(aged 24)	(United States Soccer Federation) California Baptist Lancers women's basketball
6	MF	Brielle Tautua	October 9, 2010 (age 15)	(United States Soccer Federation) Legends FC
8	MF	Alayna Fuamatu-Ma'afala	(aged 23)	(United States Soccer Federation) Sacramento State Hornets
9	MF	Alma Mana'o	July 22, 1994 (age 31)	(United States Soccer Federation) Seattle United
12	MF	Aaliyah Tu'ua	(aged 24)	(United States Soccer Federation) UC Riverside Highlanders
15	MF	Maryjane Laina		(Football Federation American Samoa)
7	FW	Atianna Fuamatu-Ma'afala	(aged 19)	(United States Soccer Federation) Peninsula College
13	FW	Mia Toeaina	(aged 15)	(United States Soccer Federation) Mustang SC
14	FW	Morgan Patea	(aged 25)	(United States Soccer Federation) Cal State Los Angeles Golden Eagles
16	FW	Anaiyah Ve'e	(aged 17)	(United States Soccer Federation) Leahi SC
17	FW	Ionare Ve'e	(aged 18)	(United States Soccer Federation) Cal State Fullerton Titans
18	FW	Noelani Tupua	(aged 17)	(United States Soccer Federation) Crossfire Premier SC
4	FW	Ayres Ava	(aged 17)	(United States Soccer Federation) Charlotte Independence SC
11	FW	Ayva-Ray Malepeai	(aged 17)	(United States Soccer Federation) Kamehameha Schools Kapālama

=== Recent call-ups ===
The following players have also been called up to the squad within the past 12 months.

Pos.	Player	Date of birth (age)	Caps	Goals	Club	Latest call-up
GK	Musuai Isaia ^{INJ}	(aged 24)	-	-	(United States) Iowa State Cyclones	v. Cook Islands; December 1, 2025
DF	Liberty Drago	(aged 16)	-	-	(United States) Slammers FC	v. Cook Islands; December 1, 2025
DF	Rochelle Lui	(aged 18)	-	-	(American Samoa) Royal Puma FC	v. Cook Islands; December 1, 2025
DF	Gabriella Tuson	(aged 18)	-	-	(United States) Waiakea HS	v. New Zealand; March 2, 2026
DF	Leilani Reed	(aged 19)	-	-	(United States) Northeastern Huskies	v. New Zealand; March 2, 2026
MF	Elcy Lui	August 6, 2002 (age 23)	-	-	(American Samoa) Royal Puma FC	v. Cook Islands; December 1, 2025
FW	Kawana Manutai	(aged 17)	-	-	(United States) North Shore Rush	v. Cook Islands; December 1, 2025
FW	Cassidy Drago	(aged 18)	-	-	(United States) California State University, Long Beach	v. Cook Islands; December 1, 2025
FW	Oloa Tofaeono	November 17, 2002 (age 23)	-	-	(American Samoa) PanSa FC	v. Cook Islands; December 1, 2025
Notes: ^{INJ} = Withdrew due to injury; ^{PRE} = Preliminary squad / standby; ^{RET} = Retired from the national team

== Competitive record ==
=== FIFA Women's World Cup ===
FIFA Women's World Cup record								Qualification record					
Host	Result	Pld	W	D*	L	GF	GA	Pld	W	D*	L	GF	GA
(China) 1991	Not member of FIFA							Not member of FIFA					
(Sweden) 1995	Not member of FIFA							Not member of FIFA					
(United States) 1999	Did not qualify							The 1998 OFC Women's Championship served as the qualifying tournament					
(United States) 2003	Withdrew							Withdrew					
(China) 2007	Did not enter							Did not enter					
(Germany) 2011	Did not enter							Did not enter					
(Canada) 2015	Did not enter							Did not enter					
(France) 2019	Did not qualify							The 2018 OFC Women's Nations Cup served as the qualifying tournament					
(Australia) (New Zealand) 2023	Did not enter							Did not enter					
(Brazil) 2027	To be determined							4	4	0	0	9	0
(Costa Rica) (Jamaica) (Mexico) (United States) 2031	To be determined							To be determined					
(United Kingdom) 2035	To be determined							To be determined					
Total	0/10	—	—	—	—	—	—	4	4	0	0	9	0

=== OFC Women's Nations Cup ===
OFC Women's Nations Cup record								Qualification record					
Host	Result	Pld	W	D*	L	GF	GA	Pld	W	D*	L	GF	GA
(New Caledonia) 1983	Not member of OFC							No qualification					
(New Zealand) 1986	Not member of OFC							No qualification					
(Australia) 1989	Not member of OFC							No qualification					
(Australia) 1991	Not member of OFC							No qualification					
(Papua New Guinea) 1994	Not member of OFC							No qualification					
(New Zealand) 1998	Group stage	2	0	0	2	0	30	No qualification					
(Australia) 2003	Withdrew							No qualification					
(Papua New Guinea) 2007	Did not enter							No qualification					
(New Zealand) 2010	Did not enter							No qualification					
(Papua New Guinea) 2014	Did not enter							No qualification					
(New Caledonia) 2018	Did not qualify							3	0	0	3	0	5
(Fiji) 2022	Did not enter							No qualification					
(Fiji) 2025	Did not enter							No qualification					
Total	1/13	2	0	0	2	0	30	3	0	0	3	0	5

=== Olympic games ===
(International Olympic Committee) Olympic Games record								Qualification record					
(United States) 1996	Ineligible							Not member of FIFA					
(Australia) 2000	Did not qualify							The 1998 OFC Women's Championship served as the qualifying tournament					
(Greece) 2004	Did not enter							Did not enter					
(China) 2008	Did not qualify							The 2007 South Pacific Games served as the qualifying tournament					
(United Kingdom) 2012	Did not enter							Did not enter					
(Brazil) 2016	Did not enter							Did not enter					
(Japan) 2020	Did not qualify							The 2018 OFC Women's Nations Cup served as the qualifying tournament					
(France) 2024	Did not qualify							3	0	0	3	1	26
(United States) 2028	To be determined							To be determined					
Total	0/9	—	—	—	—	—	—	3	0	0	3	1	26

=== Pacific Games ===
Pacific Games record
Host	Result	Pld	W	D*	L	GF	GA
(Fiji) 2003	Did not enter						
(Samoa) 2007	Group stage	4	0	1	3	1	13
(New Caledonia) 2011	Group stage	4	0	0	4	0	23
(Papua New Guinea) 2015	Did not enter						
(Samoa) 2019	Group stage	4	0	1	3	0	32
(Solomon Islands) 2023	Ninth place	4	1	0	3	3	16
Total	4/6	12	1	2	13	4	84

== See also ==
- Sport in American Samoa
  - Soccer in American Samoa
    - Women's soccer in American Samoa
- American Samoa men's national football team
- American Samoa men's national under-23 football team
- American Samoa men's national under-20 football team
- American Samoa men's national under-17 football team
- American Samoa women's national under-17 football team
