= 2026 OFC U-16 Women's Championship =

Tournament details
- Host country: Solomon Islands
- City: Honiara
- Dates: 6–19 September
- Teams: 8 (from 1 confederation)

Final positions
- Champions: New Zealand (8th title)
- Runners-up: New Caledonia
- Third place: Fiji
- Fourth place: Papua New Guinea

Tournament statistics
- Matches played: 21
- Goals scored: 99 (4.71 per match)

The 2026 OFC U-16 Women's Championship was the eighth edition of the OFC U-16 Women's Championship, the international youth football championship organized by the Oceania Football Confederation (OFC) for the women's under-16 national teams of Oceania. The tournament was played in Honiara, Solomon Islands, from 6 to 19 September 2026.

== Background ==
The Solomon Islands were selected as the host nation in May 2025. It is one of fifteen international tournaments hosted by OFC in 2026. The draw for the tournament was held on 18 February 2026.

== Teams ==
=== Final tournament ===
Team	Appearance	Previous best performance
Fiji	6th	Runners-up (2023)
New Caledonia	7th	Runners-up (2017)
New Zealand	8th	Champions (2010, 2012, 2016, 2017, 2023, 2024, 2025)
Samoa	5th	Runners-up (2025)
Solomon Islands (hosts)	5th	Runners-up (2010)
Tonga	7th	Third place (2024)

=== Preliminary stage ===
Team	Appearance	Previous best performance
Cook Islands	3rd	Third place (2012)
Papua New Guinea (hosts)	6th	Runners-up (2012, 2016)
American Samoa	4th	Group stage (2017, 2025)

Did not enter

- Tahiti (W)
- Vanuatu

Notes

- (W): Withdrew after draw

== Preliminary stage ==
A qualification round was held from 18 to 24 April 2026 in Port Moresby, Papua New Guinea.

=== Standings ===
Pos	Team	Pld	W	D	L	GF	GA	GD	Pts	Qualification
1	Cook Islands (Q)	2	1	1	0	11	1	+10	4	Final tournament
2	Papua New Guinea (H, Q)	2	1	1	0	9	3	+6	4	Final tournament (Note: Papua New Guinea was awarded a place in the final tournament after Tahiti's withdrawal.)
3	American Samoa	2	0	0	2	2	18	−16	0	

Source: OFC
(H) Hosts; (Q) Qualified for the phase indicated

Notes

18 April 2026

American Samoa	0–10	Cook Islands
	Report	Nga 4', 6', 10'; Mustonen 16'; Arere 40', 76'; Fish 52'; Topui 69'; Piri-Savage 83'; Tangatakino 90'

PNG Football Stadium, Port Moresby, Papua New Guinea

21 April 2026

American Samoa	2–8	Papua New Guinea
Lam Sam 48'; Mataio 66' (pen.)	Report	Sifas 12', 40', 44'; Gunemba 20', 36'; Lisah 42'; Donald 68'; Duadak 90'

PNG Football Stadium, Port Moresby, Papua New Guinea

24 April 2026

Cook Islands	1–1	Papua New Guinea
Arere 62' (pen.)	Report	Lisah 38'

PNG Football Stadium, Port Moresby, Papua New Guinea

== Group stage ==
=== Group A ===
Pos	Team	Pld	W	D	L	GF	GA	GD	Pts	Qualification
1	New Zealand	3	3	0	0	14	0	+14	9	Knockout stage
2	Fiji	3	2	0	1	15	4	+11	6	Knockout stage
3	Solomon Islands (H)	3	0	1	2	3	9	−6	1	
4	Cook Islands	3	0	1	2	0	19	−19	1	

Source: OFC
(H) Hosts
6 September 2026

Fiji	11–0	Cook Islands
Boseiwaqa 6', 27'; Vunivi 20'; Reva 34', 45', 51', 77', 85'; Masi 48', 88'; Narayan 90+7'	Report

6 September 2026

New Zealand	5–0	Solomon Islands
Ellis 5'; Saunders 7', 45+3', 90+3'; Dwyer 18'	Report

9 September 2026

Cook Islands	0–0	Solomon Islands
	Report

9 September 2026

New Zealand	1–0	Fiji
Rice 90+5'	Report

12 September 2026

Solomon Islands	3–4	Fiji
Waokea 34', 60'; Toro Mau 64'	Report	Naiqarau 10', 22'; Bako 42' (o.g.); Masi 62'

12 September 2026

Cook Islands	0–8	New Zealand
	Report	Toatelegese 2'; Wilkinson 14'; Saunders 34', 88'; Barber 45'; Casson 71', 83'; Rennell 90+4'

=== Group B ===
Pos	Team	Pld	W	D	L	GF	GA	GD	Pts	Qualification
1	New Caledonia	3	3	0	0	10	3	+7	9	Knockout stage
2	Papua New Guinea	3	2	0	1	8	6	+2	6	Knockout stage
3	Samoa	3	1	0	2	2	4	−2	3	
4	Tonga	3	0	0	3	3	10	−7	0	

Source: OFC
7 September 2026
18:45

Samoa	2–1	Tonga
Devoux 9', 11'	Report	Mailangi 41'

7 September 2026

New Caledonia	5–2	Papua New Guinea
Hmaen 17' (pen.), 29', 55'; Adjouhgniope 41'; Jiako 87'	Report	Sifas 32'; Danny 82'

10 September 2026

Papua New Guinea	4–1	Tonga
Lisah 7'; Sifas 23', 35'; Danny 90+3'	Report	Tenifa 85'

10 September 2026

Samoa	0–1	New Caledonia
	Report	Adjouhgniope 35'

13 September 2026

Papua New Guinea	2–0	Samoa
Duadak 69'; Sifas 84'	Report

13 September 2026

Tonga	1–4	New Caledonia
Tali 70'	Report	Adjouhgniope 4'; Haewegene 13', 52'; Jiako 43'

== Knockout stage ==
=== Semi-finals ===
16 September 2026
16:00

New Zealand	3–0	Papua New Guinea
Clark 27'; Dwyer 62'; Barber 77'	Report

Attendance: 200
Referee: Torika Delai (Fiji)

16 September 2026
19:00

New Caledonia	1–0	Fiji
Hmaen 10'	Report

Attendance: 150
Referee: Gerard Ionatana (Samoa)

=== Seventh place match ===
17 September 2026
16:00

Cook Islands	3–2	Tonga
Arere 7' (pen.); Mustonen 28'; Neagle 40'	Report	Tali 31'; May-Mann 66'

Referee: Rayan Herry (France)

=== Fifth place match ===
17 September 2026
19:00

Solomon Islands	0–2	Samoa
	Report	Leaupepe-Nickel 34'; Devoux 57'

Referee: Tellos Kaufusi (Tonga)

=== Third place match ===
19 September 2026
16:00

Papua New Guinea	1–6	Fiji
Danny 38'	Report	Vunivi 40'; Masi 48', 69'; Reva 59'; Latui 76'; Naiqarau 84'

=== Final ===
19 September 2026
19:00

New Zealand	4–0	New Caledonia
Rice 48', 66'; Wilson 87'; Hace 90+5' (o.g.)	Report
