= 2022 OFC U-17 Women's Championship =

Tournament details
- Host country: Tahiti
- Dates: Cancelled
- Teams: TBC (maximum 11) (from 1 confederation)

The 2022 OFC U-17 Women's Championship, originally to be held as the 2021 OFC U-16 Women's Championship, was to be the 5th edition of the OFC U-16/U-17 Women's Championship, the biennial international youth football championship organised by the Oceania Football Confederation (OFC) for the women's under-16/under-17 national teams of Oceania. The tournament will be hosted by Tahiti. The winner of the tournament will qualify for the 2022 FIFA U-17 Women's World Cup in India as the OFC representatives.

The tournament was originally scheduled to be held between 11–26 September 2021. However, the OFC announced on 4 March 2021 that it had been postponed due to the COVID-19 pandemic, pending FIFA’s confirmation of dates of the 2022 FIFA U-17 Women's World Cup. On 4 June 2021, the OFC announced that the tournament had been rescheduled to June 2022, with the name of the tournament changed from "2021 OFC U-16 Women's Championship" to "2022 OFC U-17 Women's Championship".

New Zealand are the four-time defending champions, having won all four editions held, with the last edition in 2020, originally also to be held in Tahiti, cancelled due to the COVID-19 pandemic.

== Teams ==
All 11 FIFA-affiliated national teams from OFC were eligible to enter the tournament.

Team	Appearance	Previous best performance
American Samoa	2nd	Group stage (2017)
Cook Islands	4th	Third place (2012)
Fiji	3rd	Third place (2016)
New Caledonia	4th	Runners-up (2017)
New Zealand	5th	Champions (2010, 2012, 2016, 2017)
Papua New Guinea	4th	Runners-up (2012, 2016)
Samoa	3rd	Group stage (2016, 2017)
Solomon Islands	3rd	Runners-up (2010)
Tahiti	2nd	Group stage (2017)
Tonga	3rd	Fourth place (2010)
Vanuatu	2nd	Group stage (2016)

== Venue ==
To be confirmed.

== Squads ==
Players born on or after 1 January 2005 are eligible to compete in the tournament.

== Qualified teams for FIFA U-17 Women's World Cup ==
The following team from OFC qualify for the 2022 FIFA U-17 Women's World Cup.

Team	Qualified on	Previous appearances in FIFA U-17 Women's World Cup^{1}
TBD	June 2022	

^{1} Bold indicates champions for that year. Italic indicates hosts for that year.
