= 2020 OFC U-17 Women's Championship =

Tournament details
- Host country: Tahiti
- City: Papeete
- Dates: Cancelled
- Teams: 9 (from 1 confederation)
- Venue: 1 (in 1 host city)

The 2020 OFC U-17 Women's Championship, originally to be held as the 2019 OFC U-16 Women's Championship, was originally to be the 5th edition of the OFC U-16/U-17 Women's Championship, the biennial international youth football championship organised by the Oceania Football Confederation (OFC) for the women's under-16/under-17 national teams of Oceania.

The 2019 OFC U-16 Women's Championship was originally scheduled to be held in New Zealand from 30 September to 12 October 2019. It was later rescheduled to be played in Tahiti from 7 to 20 December 2019. However, the OFC announced on 28 November 2019 that it would be postponed to 2020 due to the measles epidemic in the Pacific region. It was later rescheduled to 6 and 19 April 2020, with the name of the tournament changed from "2019 OFC U-16 Women's Championship" to "2020 OFC U-17 Women's Championship". However, on 9 March 2020, the OFC announced that all OFC tournaments were postponed until 6 May 2020 due to the COVID-19 pandemic. On 14 May 2020, it was announced that a further decision regarding that tournament would be made on 2 June 2020.

On 5 June 2020, the OFC announced that the tournament would be cancelled due to difficulty in rescheduling the tournament. New Zealand, who were the four-time defending champions, were nominated by the OFC Executive Committee as the OFC representatives for the 2021 FIFA U-17 Women's World Cup (originally 2020 but postponed due to COVID-19 pandemic) in India. However, FIFA announced on 17 November 2020 that this edition of the World Cup would be cancelled.

== Teams ==
Nine of the 11 FIFA-affiliated national teams from OFC entered the tournament. There would be no qualification tournament, as it was suggested first.

Team	Appearance (planned)	Previous best performance
American Samoa	2nd	Group stage (2017)
Cook Islands	4th	Third place (2012)
Fiji	3rd	Third place (2016)
New Caledonia	4th	Runners-up (2017)
New Zealand	5th	Champions (2010, 2012, 2016, 2017)
Samoa	3rd	Group stage (2016, 2017)
Tahiti	2nd	Group stage (2017)
Tonga	3rd	Fourth place (2010)
Vanuatu	2nd	Group stage (2016)

Withdrew

Papua New Guinea

Did not enter

Solomon Islands

== Venue ==
The matches were originally to be played at the Stade Pater, Pirae.

== Squads ==
Players born on or after 1 January 2003 were eligible to compete in the tournament.

== Draw ==
The original draw of the tournament was held on 17 April 2019 at the OFC Academy in Auckland, New Zealand. The 10 teams were drawn into three groups, with Group A having four teams and Groups B and C having three teams. As the hosts were not known at the time of the draw, all teams were drawn into the group positions without any seeding, with the only restriction that the defending champions New Zealand must be drawn into Group A. The original draw results were:

Group A

- Cook Islands
- Tahiti
- Fiji
- New Zealand

Group B

- Tonga
- Samoa
- Vanuatu

Group C

- American Samoa
- New Caledonia
- Papua New Guinea

However, after Papua New Guinea withdrew, a re-draw was held. The nine teams were drawn into three groups of three teams.

== Group stage ==
The winners of each group and the runners-up of Group A would advance to the semi-finals.

All times are local, TAHT (UTC−10).

=== Group A ===
Pos	Team	Pld	W	D	L	GF	GA	GD	Pts	Qualification
1	American Samoa	0	0	0	0	0	0	0	0	Knockout stage
2	Fiji	0	0	0	0	0	0	0	0	Knockout stage
3	Tonga	0	0	0	0	0	0	0	0	

Source: OFC

Tonga	Cancelled	Fiji
	Report

Stade Pater, Pirae

Fiji	Cancelled	American Samoa
	Report

Stade Pater, Pirae

American Samoa	Cancelled	Tonga
	Report

Stade Pater, Pirae

=== Group B ===
Pos	Team	Pld	W	D	L	GF	GA	GD	Pts	Qualification
1	New Zealand	0	0	0	0	0	0	0	0	Knockout stage
2	Tahiti	0	0	0	0	0	0	0	0	
3	Vanuatu	0	0	0	0	0	0	0	0	

Source: OFC

Vanuatu	Cancelled	Tahiti
	Report

Stade Pater, Pirae

Tahiti	Cancelled	New Zealand
	Report

Stade Pater, Pirae

New Zealand	Cancelled	Vanuatu
	Report

Stade Pater, Pirae

=== Group C ===
Pos	Team	Pld	W	D	L	GF	GA	GD	Pts	Qualification
1	Cook Islands	0	0	0	0	0	0	0	0	Knockout stage
2	New Caledonia	0	0	0	0	0	0	0	0	
3	Samoa	0	0	0	0	0	0	0	0	

Source: OFC

Samoa	Cancelled	Cook Islands
	Report

Stade Pater, Pirae

Cook Islands	Cancelled	New Caledonia
	Report

Stade Pater, Pirae

New Caledonia	Cancelled	Samoa
	Report

Stade Pater, Pirae

== Knockout stage ==
=== Bracket ===
Semi-finals
– Stade Pater
Winner Group A
Winner Group C
– Stade Pater
Winner Group B
Runner-up Group A

Final
– Stade Pater
Winner Semi-final 1
Winner Semi-final 2
Third place match
– Stade Pater
Loser Semi-final 1
Loser Semi-final 2

=== Semi-finals ===
Winner Group A	Cancelled	Winner Group C
	Report

Stade Pater, Pirae

Winner Group B	Cancelled	Runner-up Group A
	Report

Stade Pater, Pirae

=== Third place match ===
Loser Semi-final 1	Cancelled	Loser Semi-final 2
	Report

Stade Pater, Pirae

=== Final ===
Winner would have qualified for 2021 FIFA U-17 Women's World Cup.

Winner Semi-final 1	Cancelled	Winner Semi-final 2
	Report

Stade Pater, Pirae

== Qualified teams for FIFA U-17 Women's World Cup ==
The following team from OFC, nominated by the OFC Executive Committee, would have qualified for the 2021 FIFA U-17 Women's World Cup before the tournament was cancelled.

Team	Qualified on	Previous appearances in FIFA U-17 Women's World Cup^{1}
New Zealand	5 June 2020	6 (2008, 2010, 2012, 2014, 2016, 2018)

^{1} Bold indicates champions for that year. Italic indicates hosts for that year.
