= 2025 OFC U-16 Women's Championship =

Tournament details
- Host country: Samoa
- City: Vaitele
- Dates: 1–14 August
- Teams: 8
- Venue: 1

Final positions
- Champions: New Zealand (7th title)
- Runners-up: Samoa
- Third place: New Caledonia
- Fourth place: Solomon Islands

Tournament statistics
- Matches played: 18
- Goals scored: 72 (4 per match)
- Top scorer(s): (New Caledonia) Kinë Hmaen (10 goals)
- Best player: (New Caledonia) Kinë Hmaen
- Best goalkeeper: (New Caledonia) Kessyna Nyipie
- Fair play award: New Caledonia

The 2025 OFC U-16 Women's Championship was the 7th edition of the OFC U-16 Women's Championship, and the fourth with the U-16 format. The tournament was held from 1 to 14 August 2025.

The top two teams qualified for the 2026 FIFA U-17 Women's World Cup in Morocco as the OFC representatives.

== Teams ==
Byes to the
final tournament
1. Fiji
2. New Caledonia
3. New Zealand
4. Samoa
5. Solomon Islands
6. Tahiti
7. Tonga
Participating in
Qualification
8. Cook Islands
9. American Samoa
10. Papua New Guinea

Did not enter

- Vanuatu

== Qualification ==
=== Standings ===
Pos	Team	Pld	W	D	L	GF	GA	GD	Pts	Qualification
1	American Samoa (Q)	2	2	0	0	6	4	+2	6	Final tournament
2	Cook Islands (H)	2	0	1	1	5	6	−1	1	
3	Papua New Guinea	2	0	1	1	1	2	−1	1	

Source: OFC
(H) Hosts; (Q) Qualified for the phase indicated
26 April 2025
15:00

Papua New Guinea	1–1	Cook Islands
Raminai 9'	Report	Arere 90+6' (pen.)

CIFA Academy, Matavera, Cook Islands
Attendance: 150
Referee: Jovita Ambrose (Solomon Islands)

29 April 2025
15:00

Papua New Guinea	0–1	American Samoa
	Report	Satele 62'

CIFA Academy, Matavera, Cook Islands
Referee: Yantama Atoa (Tonga)

2 May 2025
15:00

Cook Islands	4–5	American Samoa
Arere 6', 59', 74'; Pitomaki 45+1'	Report	Lam Sam 8'; Satele 11', 19'; Laima 25', 49'

CIFA Academy, Matavera, Cook Islands
Attendance: 250
Referee: Jovita Ambrose (Solomon Islands)

== Group stage ==
=== Group A ===
Pos	Team	Pld	W	D	L	GF	GA	GD	Pts	Qualification
1	Samoa (H)	3	3	0	0	10	0	+10	9	Knockout stage
2	New Caledonia	3	2	0	1	10	7	+3	6	Knockout stage
3	Fiji	3	1	0	2	4	10	−6	3	
4	Tahiti	3	0	0	3	2	9	−7	0	

Source: OFC
(H) Hosts
1 August 2025
11:00

Fiji	4–0	Tahiti
Levuiciva 11'; Reva 45'; Dama 62' (pen.); Katonitabua 90'	Report

Samoa Football HQ - Field 1, Vaitele
Referee: Beth Rattray (New Zealand)
1 August 2025
15:00

Samoa	5–0	New Caledonia
Willis 39', 45'; Johnson 90'; Buama 90' (o.g.); Tumanuvao 90'	Report

Samoa Football HQ - Field 1, Vaitele
Attendance: 400
Referee: Shama Maemae (Solomon Islands)

4 August 2025
11:00

Tahiti	2–4	New Caledonia
Flosse 6'; Kautai 90'	Report	Hmaen 45', 87'; Adjouhgniope 67'; Nyikeine 90'

Samoa Football HQ - Field 1, Vaitele
Referee: Jarethy George (Vanuatu)
4 August 2025
15:00

Samoa	4–0	Fiji
Tuiolosega 36', 89'; Ava 58'; Johnson 70'	Report

Samoa Football HQ - Field 1, Vaitele
Referee: Yantama Atoa (Tonga)

7 August 2025
11:00

New Caledonia	6–0	Fiji
Adjouhgniope 28', 45'; Hmaen 45'; Bako 56'; Sameke 57'; Nyikeine 90'	Report

Samoa Football HQ - Field 1, Vaitele
Referee: Beth Rattray (New Zealand)
7 August 2025
15:00

Tahiti	0–1	Samoa
	Report	Auvaa 81'

Samoa Football HQ - Field 1, Vaitele
Referee: Michael Urui (Solomon Islands)

=== Group B ===
Pos	Team	Pld	W	D	L	GF	GA	GD	Pts	Qualification
1	New Zealand	3	3	0	0	15	0	+15	9	Knockout stage
2	Solomon Islands	3	2	0	1	2	5	−3	6	Knockout stage
3	Tonga	3	1	0	2	2	6	−4	3	
4	American Samoa	3	0	0	3	1	9	−8	0	

Source: OFC
2 August 2025
11:00

Solomon Islands	1–0	American Samoa
Ereanimae 38'	Report

Samoa Football HQ - Field 2, Vaitele
Referee: Torika Delai (Fiji)
2 August 2025
15:00

New Zealand	4–0	Tonga
Robson 25', 45', 90'; Humphrey 68'	Report

Samoa Football HQ - Field 2, Vaitele
Attendance: 250
Referee: Kyllian Lelarge (New Caledonia)

5 August 2025
11:00

American Samoa	1–2	Tonga
Joung 20'	Report	Mann 45'; Sau 85'

Samoa Football HQ - Field 2, Vaitele
Referee: Gerard Ionatana (Samoa)
5 August 2025
15:00

New Zealand	5–0	Solomon Islands
Rice 37'; Humphrey 45'; Hitchcock 56'; Fili 74'; Summers 83'	Report

Samoa Football HQ - Field 2, Vaitele
Referee: Torika Delai (Fiji)

8 August 2025
11:00

Tonga	0–1	Solomon Islands
	Report	Ragaruma 74'

Samoa Football HQ - Field 2, Vaitele
Attendance: 200
Referee: Kyllian Lelarge (New Caledonia)
8 August 2025
15:00

American Samoa	0–6	New Zealand
	Report	Vosper 26'; Sharkey 43'; Robson 45'; Gray 63'; Summers 66'; Chaytor 68'

Samoa Football HQ - Field 2, Vaitele
Referee: Alexandra Toto (Vanuatu)

== Placement matches ==
=== 7th place match ===
12 August 2025
11:00

Tahiti	2–0	American Samoa
Nekrouf 9'; Warren 56'	Report

Samoa Football HQ - Field 1, Vaitele

=== 5th place match ===
12 August 2025
15:00

Fiji	0–1	Tonga
	Report	Mann 70'

Samoa Football HQ - Field 1, Vaitele

== Knockout stage ==
Semi-finals
11 August
Samoa	5
Solomon Islands	0
11 August
New Zealand	4
New Caledonia	2

Final
14 August
Samoa	0
New Zealand	3
Third place match
14 August
Solomon Islands	0
New Caledonia	9

=== Semi-finals ===
Winners qualified for the 2026 FIFA U-17 Women's World Cup.

11 August 2025
11:00

Samoa	5–0	Solomon Islands
Rotoava 10' (o.g.); Kitiona 30'; Johnson 59'; Devoux 69'; Auvaa 83'	Report

Samoa Football HQ - Field 1, Vaitele
Attendance: 400
Referee: Beth Rattray (New Zealand)

11 August 2025
15:00

New Zealand	4–2	New Caledonia
Robson 15'; Hitchcock 52'; Humphrey 55', 88'	Report	Hmaen 29'; Buama 90'

Samoa Football HQ - Field 1, Vaitele
Referee: Shama Maemae (Solomon Islands)

=== Third place match ===
14 August 2025
11:00

Solomon Islands	0–9	New Caledonia
	Report	Hmaen 9', 15' (pen.), 22', 40', 45+2', 70'; Adjouhgniope 45+7'; Ijelipa 75'; Nemoinon 82'

Samoa Football HQ - Field 1, Vaitele

=== Final ===
14 August 2025
15:00

Samoa	0–3	New Zealand
	Report	Fili 6'; Hitchcock 18'; Robson 29'

Samoa Football HQ - Field 1, Vaitele
Referee: Torika Delai (Fiji)

== Qualified teams for FIFA U-17 Women's World Cup 2026 ==
The following team from OFC qualified for the 2026 FIFA U-17 Women's World Cup in Morocco.

Teams	Qualified on	Previous appearances in FIFA U-17 Women's World Cup^{1}
Samoa	11 August 2025	1 (2025)
New Zealand	11 August 2025	9 (2008, 2010, 2012, 2014, 2016, 2018, 2022, 2024, 2025)

^{1} Bold indicates champions for that year. Italic indicates hosts for that year.
