= 2024 OFC U-16 Women's Championship =

Tournament details
- Host country: Fiji
- City: Suva
- Dates: 8–21 September
- Teams: 8 (from 1 confederation)
- Venue: 1 (in 1 host city)

Final positions
- Champions: New Zealand (6th title)
- Runners-up: Samoa
- Third place: Tonga
- Fourth place: New Caledonia

Tournament statistics
- Matches played: 18
- Goals scored: 69 (3.83 per match)
- Attendance: 1,560 (87 per match)
- Top scorer(s): (New Zealand) Laura Bennett (6 goals)
- Best player: (New Zealand) Pia Vlok
- Best goalkeeper: (Samoa) Margaret Fagasuisui Tuii

The 2024 OFC U-16 Women's Championship was the 6th edition of the OFC U-16 Women's Championship, and the third with the U-16 format. The tournament is holding between 8 and 21 September 2024 in Fiji.

The top two teams qualified for the 2025 FIFA U-17 Women's World Cup in Morocco as the OFC representatives.

== Teams ==
=== Qualification ===
Starting from this edition, a four-team qualifying stage was introduced for the competition. The four lowest-ranked teams – Vanuatu, who finished eighth in the last edition, and the three teams that missed the previous tournament – were originally set to compete in a single-group tournament. However, Vanuatu did not enter, leaving just three teams. In June 2024, Samoa won the three-team qualifying group and secured a spot in the tournament.

=== Qualified teams ===
The following teams qualified for the tournament.

Team	Method of qualification	Appearance	Previous best performance
Cook Islands	Automatic qualification	5th	Third place (2012)
Fiji	Automatic qualification	4th	Runners-up (2023)
New Caledonia	Automatic qualification	5th	Runners-up (2017)
New Zealand	Automatic qualification	6th	Champions (2010, 2012, 2016, 2017, 2023)
Solomon Islands	Automatic qualification	3rd	Runners-up (2010)
Tahiti	Automatic qualification	3rd	Third place (2023)
Tonga	Automatic qualification	5th	Fourth place (2010, 2023)
Samoa	Qualifying stage winner	3rd	Group stage (2016)

Did not enter

- Vanuatu

== Qualifying results ==
Pos	Team	Pld	W	D	L	GF	GA	GD	Pts	Qualification
1	Samoa	2	2	0	0	22	0	+22	6	Qualify for Final tournament
2	American Samoa	2	1	0	1	1	11	−10	3	
3	Papua New Guinea	2	0	0	2	0	12	−12	0	

Source: OFC
14 June 2024
12:00

Papua New Guinea	0–1	American Samoa
	Report	S Pritchard 57'

Ngahue Reserve – Field 1, Auckland, New Zealand
Attendance: 200
Referee: Jovita Ambrose (Solomon Islands)

17 June 2024
12:00

Papua New Guinea	0–11	Samoa
	Report	Aiono Sagiao 3', 24', 43'; T Devoux 21'; Taeoalli 27'; Willis 28', 44'; Leapai 34', 39', 45', 51'

Ngahue Reserve – Field 1, Auckland, New Zealand
Attendance: 400
Referee: Yantama Atoa (Tonga)

20 June 2024
12:00

American Samoa	0–11	Samoa
	Report	Leapai 1', 5', 10'; Willis 2'; Tua 18' (o.g.); Taeoalli 24'; Skeers 45', 63'; Toatelegese 72', 88'; Ava 90+1'

Ngahue Reserve – Field 1, Auckland, New Zealand
Attendance: 600
Referee: Jovita Ambrose (Solomon Islands)

== Group stage ==
The draw for the group stage was held on 6 March 2024.

=== Group A ===
Pos	Team	Pld	W	D	L	GF	GA	GD	Pts	Qualification
1	Samoa	3	3	0	0	13	0	+13	9	Knockout stage
2	Tonga	3	1	1	1	9	5	+4	4	Knockout stage
3	Fiji (H)	3	1	1	1	5	4	+1	4	5th place match
4	Cook Islands	3	0	0	3	0	18	−18	0	7th place match

Source: OFC
(H) Hosts
8 September 2024
12:00

Cook Islands	0–10	Samoa
	Report	Nansen 3', 22', 48'; Sagapolutele 8', 14'; Leapai 18', 51'; Ava 35'; Aiono Sagiao 72', 81'

HFC Bank Stadium, Suva
Attendance: 50
Referee: Beth Rattray (New Zealand)
8 September 2024
15:00

Fiji	3–3	Tonga
Vuniyayawa 25'; Kuladina 39'; Lakavutu 79'	Report	Malohifo'ou 49', 84'; Bagiante 53'

HFC Bank Stadium, Suva
Attendance: 100
Referee: Shama Maemae (Solomon Islands)

11 September 2024
12:00

Samoa	2–0	Tonga
Devoux 19'; Aiono Sagiao 80'	Report

HFC Bank Stadium, Suva
Attendance: 100
Referee: Kyllian Lelarge (New Caledonia)
11 September 2024
15:00

Fiji	2–0	Cook Islands
Kuladina 14'; Lakavutu 19'	Report

HFC Bank Stadium, Suva
Attendance: 130
Referee: Jovita Ambrose (Solomon Islands)

14 September 2024
12:00

Tonga	6–0	Cook Islands
Malohifo'ou 39', 49'; Tonga 63', 70'; Bagiante 80'; Moala 90+4'	Report

HFC Bank Stadium, Suva
Attendance: 50
Referee: Sarah Jones (New Zealand)
14 September 2024
15:00

Samoa	1–0	Fiji
Ava 51'	Report

HFC Bank Stadium, Suva
Attendance: 150
Referee: Beth Rattray (New Zealand)

=== Group B ===
Pos	Team	Pld	W	D	L	GF	GA	GD	Pts	Qualification
1	New Zealand	3	3	0	0	14	0	+14	9	Knockout stage
2	New Caledonia	3	2	0	1	5	10	−5	6	Knockout stage
3	Solomon Islands	3	1	0	2	3	3	0	3	5th place match
4	Tahiti	3	0	0	3	1	10	−9	0	7th place match

Source: OFC
9 September 2024
12:00

New Zealand	8–0	New Caledonia
Tichbon 5', 32'; Bennett 12', 28', 57', 69'; Duncan 22', 77'	Report

HFC Bank Stadium, Suva
Attendance: 50
Referee: Torika Delai (Fiji)
9 September 2024
15:00

Tahiti	0–2	Solomon Islands
	Report	Kini 5'; Areni 71'

HFC Bank Stadium, Suva
Attendance: 110
Referee: Yantama Atoa (Tonga)

12 September 2024
12:00

New Zealand	5–0	Tahiti
Vlok 25'; Robins 45'; Duncan 45+2'; Avery 59'; Solomon 72'	Report

HFC Bank Stadium, Suva
Attendance: 50
Referee: Gerard Ionatana (Samoa)
12 September 2024
15:00

Solomon Islands	1–2	New Caledonia
Kini 12'	Report	Hmaen 9', 60'

HFC Bank Stadium, Suva
Attendance: 100
Referee: Deepak Raj (Fiji)

15 September 2024
12:00

Solomon Islands	0–1	New Zealand
	Report	Oneill 11'

HFC Bank Stadium, Suva
Attendance: 100
Referee: Jarethy George (Vanuatu)
15 September 2024
15:00

New Caledonia	3–1	Tahiti
Hmaen 36', 81'; Nyikeine 69'	Report	Pani 73'

HFC Bank Stadium, Suva
Attendance: 100
Referee: Torika Delai (Fiji)

== Placement matches ==
=== 7th place match ===
19 September 2024
12:00

Cook Islands	1–2	Tahiti
Nia 7'	Report	Nekrouf 49'; Uini 71' (o.g.)

HFC Bank Stadium, Suva
Referee: Yantama Atoa (Tonga)

=== 5th place match ===
19 September 2024
15:00

Fiji	1–0	Solomon Islands
Kuladina 70'	Report

HFC Bank Stadium, Suva
Attendance: 70
Referee: Sarah Jones (New Zealand)

== Knockout stage ==
Semi-finals
18 September
Samoa	2
New Caledonia	0
18 September
New Zealand	8
Tonga	0

Final
21 September
Samoa	0
New Zealand	4
Third place match
21 September
New Caledonia	0
Tonga	1

=== Semi-finals ===
Winners will qualify for 2025 FIFA U-17 Women's World Cup.

18 September 2024
12:00

Samoa	2–0	New Caledonia
Leapai 3'; Nansen 6'	Report

HFC Bank Stadium, Suva
Attendance: 50
Referee: Shama Maemae (Solomon Islands)
18 September 2024
15:00

New Zealand	8–0	Tonga
Bennett 6'; Pugh 12'; Duncan 22', 90'; Vlok 33'; McGillivray 54'; March 70'; Avery 89'	Report

HFC Bank Stadium, Suva
Attendance: 50
Referee: Jarethy George (Vanuatu)

=== Third place match ===
21 September 2024
12:00

New Caledonia	0–1	Tonga
	Report	Malohifo'ou 56'

HFC Bank Stadium, Suva
Attendance: 100
Referee: Beth Rattray (New Zealand)

=== Final ===
21 September 2024
15:00

Samoa	0–4	New Zealand
	Report	Pugh 19'; Vlok 45+2', 56'; Bennett 90'

HFC Bank Stadium, Suva
Attendance: 200
Referee: Torika Delai (Fiji)

== Qualified teams for FIFA U-17 Women's World Cup 2025 ==
The following team from OFC qualified for the 2025 FIFA U-17 Women's World Cup in Morocco.

Teams	Qualified on	Previous appearances in FIFA U-17 Women's World Cup^{1}
Samoa	18 September 2024	0 (debut)
New Zealand	18 September 2024	8 (2008, 2010, 2012, 2014, 2016, 2018, 2022, 2024)

^{1} Bold indicates champions for that year. Italic indicates hosts for that year.

== Goalscorers ==
There were 69 goals scored in 18 matches, for an average of 3.83 goals per match.

6 goals

- (New Zealand) Laura Bennett

5 goals

- (New Zealand) Grace Duncan
- (Tonga) Kuria Malohifo'ou

4 goals

- (New Caledonia) Kinë Hmaen
- (New Zealand) Pia Volk
- (Samoa) Kealia Nansen

3 goals

- (Fiji) Sisilia Tuvou Kuladina
- (Samoa) Lynn Aiono Sagiao
- (Samoa) Holly Leapai

2 goals

- (Fiji) Grace Lakavutu
- (New Zealand) Derelle Avery
- (New Zealand) Katie Pugh
- (New Zealand) Keira Tichbon
- (Samoa) Ayres Ava
- (Samoa) Jayde Sagapolutele
- (Solomon Islands) Gracester Kini
- (Tonga) Tyra Bagiante
- Tema Tonga

1 goal

- (Cook Islands) Tauariki Nia
- (Fiji) Suliana Vuniyayawa
- (New Zealand) Charley March
- (New Zealand) Kara McGillivray
- (New Zealand) Piper Oneill
- (New Zealand) Holly Robins
- (New Zealand) Kya Solomon
- (Samoa) T Devoux
- (Solomon Islands) Brenda Areni
- (New Caledonia) Bernadette Nyikeine
- (French Polynesia) Anikua Nekrouf
- (French Polynesia) Vaiuta Pani
- (Tonga) Sophiana Moala

1 own goal

- (Cook Islands) Vahine Uini (against Tahiti)
