= Pia Vlok =

New Zealand footballer (born 2008)

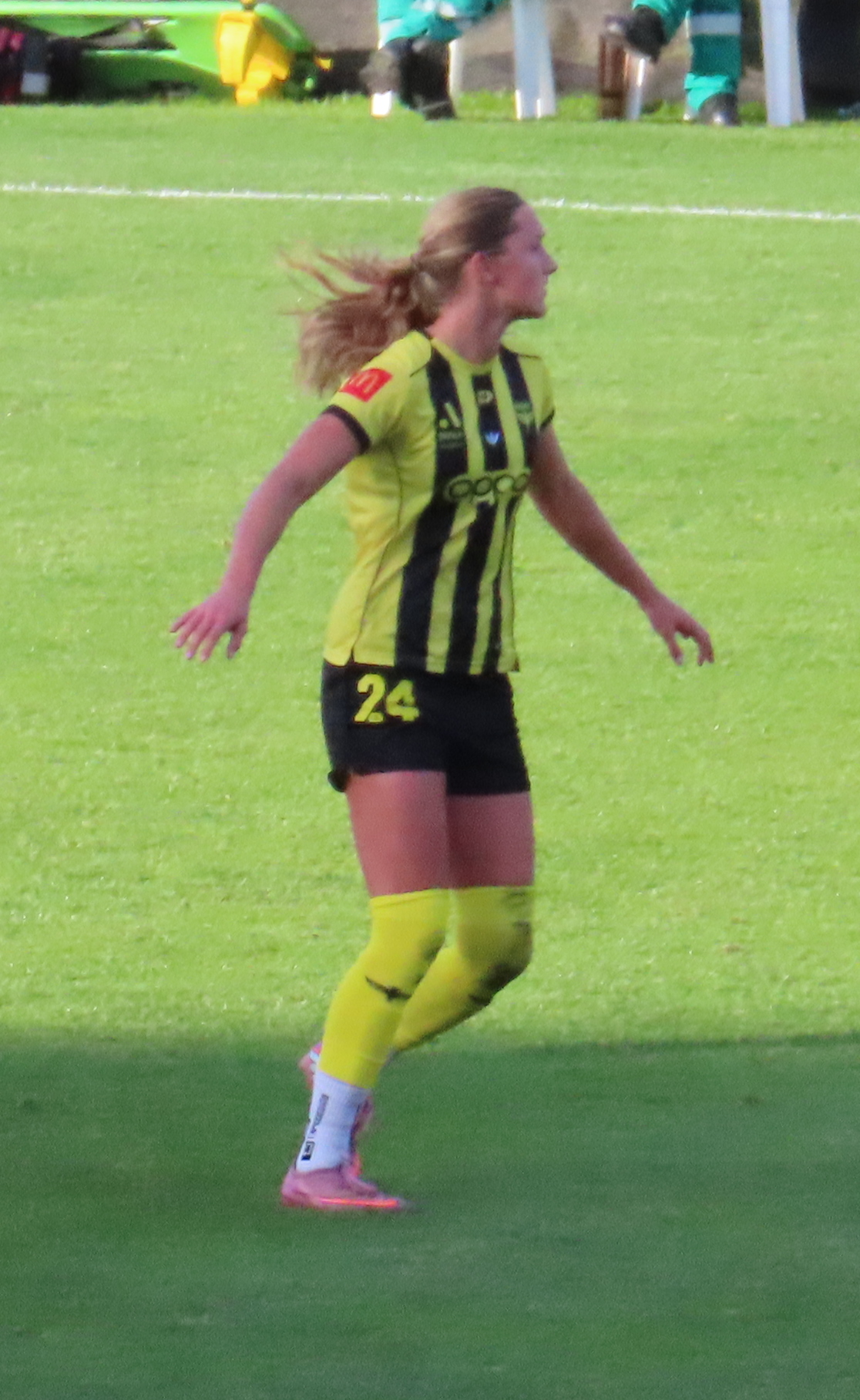
- Vlok playing for Wellington Phoenix in 2026.

Personal information
- Full name: Pia Eloise Vlok
- Date of birth: 4 September 2008 (age 18)
- Height: 1.78 m (5 ft 10 in)
- Positions: Forward; midfielder

Team information
- Current team: Wellington Phoenix
- Number: 24

Youth career
- Three Kings United
- Central United
- Bucklands Beach
- Auckland United

Senior career*
Years	Team	Apps	(Gls)
2024	Auckland United		
2025–	Wellington Phoenix	22	(6)

International career^{‡}
2024–2026	New Zealand U17	10	(4)
2026–	New Zealand U20	0	(0)
2026–	New Zealand	7	(1)
- * Club domestic league appearances and goals as of 14 September 2026. ‡ National team caps and goals as of 14 September 2026.

Pia Eloise Vlok (/ˈpiː.ə vlɒk/ PEE-ə vlok; born 4 September 2008) is a New Zealand footballer who plays as a striker or attacking midfielder for A-League Women club Wellington Phoenix and the New Zealand national team. She previously played for New Zealand Women's National League (NZWNL) club Auckland United, and has represented the New Zealand under-17 and under-20 national teams.

== Early life ==
Vlok was born on 4 September 2008, and grew up in Auckland. She was educated at Saint Kentigern College and Mount Albert Grammar School in the suburbs of Pakuranga and Mount Albert, respectively.

As a child, she first played for Three Kings United, before having stints at Central United and Bucklands Beach, then joining Auckland United at age 12. She also played with and against boys in her youth years.

== Club career ==
=== Auckland United ===
Vlok began playing for Auckland United as a youth aged 12 years old, before breaking into the first team in 2024 (aged 16). In the 2024 season, she helped the club win an unbeaten quadruple, and scored the opener in the grand final against Waterside Karori on 1 December 2024, which Auckland United won 3–1 at North Harbour Stadium in Albany.

=== Wellington Phoenix ===
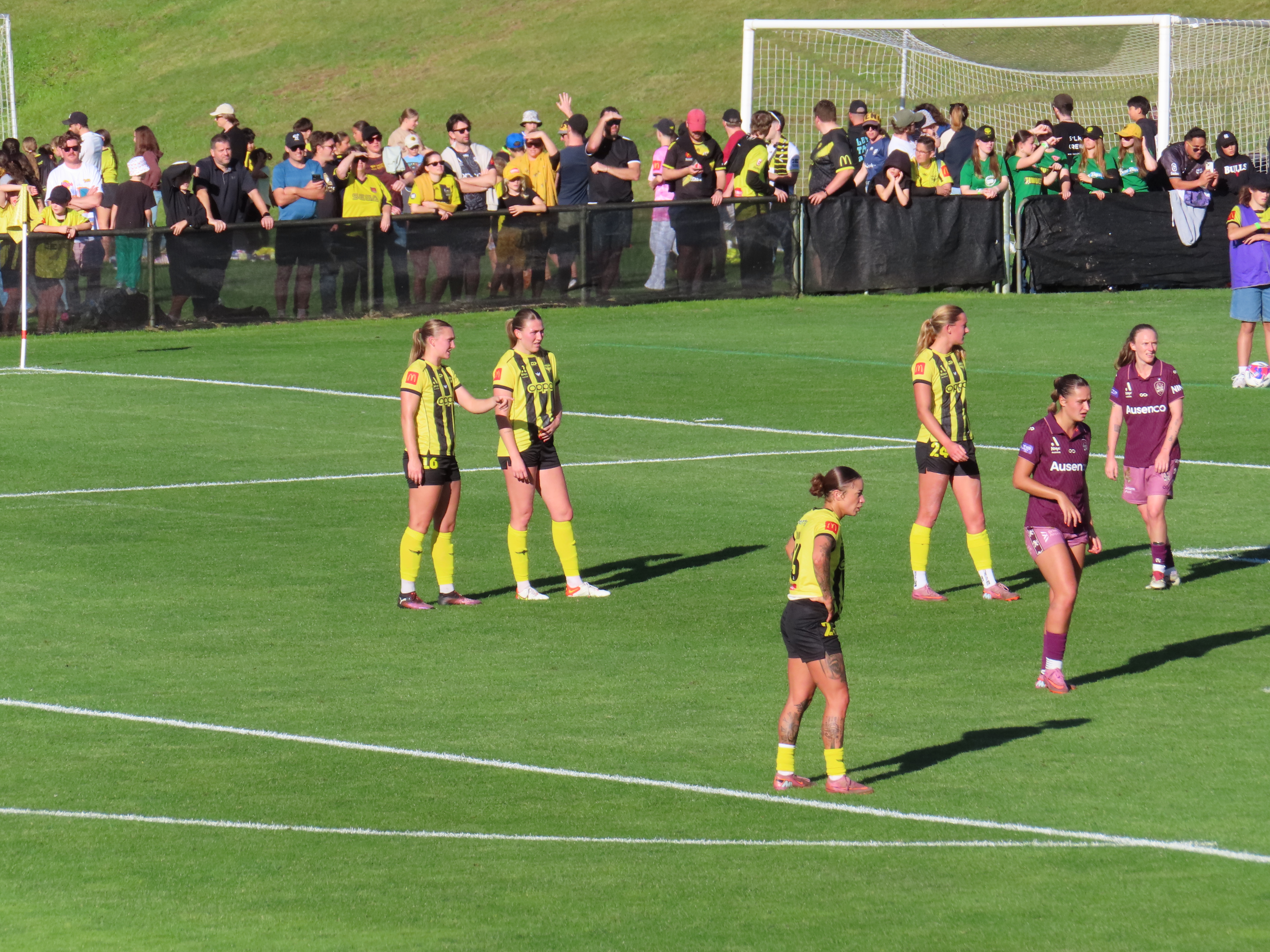
Vlok, Marisa van der Meer, Ellie Walker, and Brooke Nunn preparing for a corner kick in May 2026 for the Wellington Phoenix FC.

Vlok signed for A-League Women club Wellington Phoenix ahead of the 2025–26 season. She made her debut on 8 November 2025 in the club's opening match, coming on as a substitute in a 1–1 home draw with Canberra United at Wellington Regional Stadium in Pipitea. On 16 November 2025, she picked up her first assist for the club, assisting Brooke Nunn's goal in a 1–1 draw at home with Newcastle Jets at Jerry Collins Stadium in Cannons Creek, Porirua. On 23 November 2025, she scored her first goal for the club, scoring the sole goal in a 1–0 home victory over Melbourne Victory. She scored her first hat-trick for the club on 1 February 2026 in a 5–1 away win over Newcastle Jets at Newcastle Number 2 Sports Ground in Newcastle West, becoming the first ever Phoenix player to score an A-League Women hat-trick. In Vlok's first season, the Wellington Phoenix reached the A-League Women Finals for the first time. In the postseason, she was selected for the A-Leagues All Stars Women team that will play against Women's Super League (WSL) club Chelsea in the 2026 game at Allianz Stadium in Moore Park, Sydney as part of the 2026 Sydney Super Cup.

== International career ==
=== New Zealand U17 ===
Vlok was part of the New Zealand under-17 national team's squad for the 2024 OFC U-16 Women's Championship at HFC Bank Stadium in Suva, Fiji, which New Zealand won. She played in every match at the tournament and scored in three matches: a 5–0 group stage win over Tahiti on 12 September, an 8–0 semi-final win over Tonga on 18 September, and a 4–0 win over Samoa in the final on 21 September, in which she scored a brace. She was named Player of the Tournament.

Vlok was again called up for the under-17 national team as part of manager Alana Gunn's 21-player squad for the 2024 FIFA U-17 Women's World Cup in the Dominican Republic. Of the three group stage matches (all of which were held at Estadio Cibao FC in Santiago de los Caballeros), she was an unused substitute in a 4–1 loss to Nigeria on 17 October, and started in both a 1–1 draw with hosts the Dominican Republic on 19 October and a 4–0 loss to Ecuador on 22 October. The Young Ferns were eliminated in the group stage with one point.

Vlok once again was called up by Gunn as part of her 21-player squad for the 2025 FIFA U-17 Women's World Cup in Morocco. As the team's captain, she played all three group stage (all of which were played at Mohammed VI Football Academy in Salé): a 3–0 loss to Japan on 19 October, a 4–1 loss to Paraguay on 22 October and a 4–0 loss to Zambia on 25 October. The Young Ferns were again eliminated in the group stage, this time without any points.

=== New Zealand U20 ===
On 17 August 2026, Vlok was named in the 21-player squad for New Zealand in the 2026 FIFA U-20 Women's World Cup in Poland in September. Vlok was one of nine players from the Wellington Phoenix. The Junior Football Ferns played against Japan, Italy, and the United States in Group D. Vlok made three appearances in the tournament, with New Zealand exiting the tournament following the group stage's conclusion.

=== New Zealand ===
On 4 February 2026, Vlok was named as part of the senior New Zealand national team's squad playing in the second round of the OFC qualification for the 2027 FIFA Women's World Cup. Vlok made her Football Ferns debut on 27 February in an 8–0 win over the Samoa women's national football team, coming on as a substitute for fellow Wellington Phoenix teammate Emma Pijnenburg. On 2 March, Vlok scored her first goal for the Football Ferns in an 8–0 win against the Solomon Islands.

== International goals ==
No.	Date	Venue	Opponent	Score	Result	Competition
1.	2 March 2026	National Stadium, Honiara, Solomon Islands	Solomon Islands	7–0	8–0	2027 FIFA Women's World Cup qualification

== Honours ==
Auckland United

- Kate Sheppard Cup: 2024
- New Zealand Women's National League: 2024
- NRFL Women's Premiership: 2024
- OFC Women's Champions League: 2024, 2025

New Zealand U17

- OFC U-16 Women's Championship: 2024

Individual

- A-League Women Young Footballer of the Year: 2025–26
- OFC U-16 Women's Championship Player of the Tournament: 2024
