= 2023 OFC U-16 Women's Championship =

Tournament details
- Host country: Tahiti
- City: Pirae
- Dates: 13–26 September
- Teams: 8 (from 1 confederation)
- Venue: 1 (in 1 host city)

Final positions
- Champions: New Zealand (5th title)
- Runners-up: Fiji
- Third place: Tahiti
- Fourth place: Tonga

Tournament statistics
- Matches played: 18
- Goals scored: 125 (6.94 per match)
- Attendance: 4,847 (269 per match)
- Top scorer(s): (New Zealand) Laura Bennett (10 goals)

The 2023 OFC U-16 Women’s Championship was the 5th edition of the OFC U-16 Women's Championship, and the second with the U-16 format. The tournament was held between 13 and 26 September 2023, in Tahiti. The defending champions from the U-17 editions were New Zealand, who have four titles in the tournament.

The winner of the tournament qualified for the 2024 FIFA U-17 Women's World Cup in the Dominican Republic as the OFC representative.

== Teams ==
Eight of the 11 FIFA-affiliated national teams from OFC entered the tournament.

Team	Appearance	Previous best performance
Cook Islands	4th	Third place (2012)
Fiji	3rd	Third place (2016)
New Caledonia	4th	Runners-up (2017)
New Zealand	5th	Champions (2010, 2012, 2016, 2017)
Solomon Islands	2nd	Runners-up (2010)
Tahiti (hosts)	2nd	Group stage (2017)
Tonga	4th	Fourth place (2010)
Vanuatu	2nd	Group stage (2016)

Withdrew

- Papua New Guinea
- Samoa

Did not enter

- American Samoa

== Group stage ==
The draw for the group stage was held on 18 May 2023. The Oceania Football Confederation (OFC) confirmed that Papua New Guinea and Samoa have withdrawn from the OFC U-16 Women’s Championship. The re-draw was held on 8 September.

=== Group A ===
Pos	Team	Pld	W	D	L	GF	GA	GD	Pts	Qualification
1	Tahiti (H)	3	2	1	0	6	1	+5	7	Knockout stage
2	Tonga	3	1	1	1	8	5	+3	4	Knockout stage
3	New Caledonia	3	0	3	0	3	3	0	3	5th place match
4	Solomon Islands	3	0	1	2	2	10	−8	1	7th place match

Source: OFC
(H) Hosts
13 September 2023
16:00

Tonga	5–1	Solomon Islands
Faletau 26', 29', 40', 55', 59'	Report	Kini 75'

Stade Pater Te Hono Nui, Pirae
Attendance: 265
Referee: Torika Delai (Fiji)
13 September 2023
19:00

New Caledonia	0–0	Tahiti
	Report

Stade Pater Te Hono Nui, Pirae
Attendance: 473
Referee: Beth Rattray (New Zealand)

16 September 2023
16:00

New Caledonia	2–2	Tonga
Kourevi 37'; Honakoko 77'	Report	Faletau 60'; Pongi 73'

Stade Pater Te Hono Nui, Pirae
Attendance: 100
Referee: David Yareboinen (Papua New Guinea)
16 September 2023
19:00

Solomon Islands	0–4	Tahiti
	Report	Tahutini 16'; Le Gayic 36'; Leodolter 45'; Gendron 77'

Stade Pater Te Hono Nui, Pirae
Attendance: 325
Referee: Gerard Ionatana (Samoa)

19 September 2023
16:00

Solomon Islands	1–1	New Caledonia
Kini 72'	Report	Wahnawe 90'

Stade Pater Te Hono Nui, Pirae
Attendance: 185
Referee: Torika Delai (Fiji)
19 September 2023
19:00

Tahiti	2–1	Tonga
Tupahururu 63'; Kautai 76'	Report	Tonga 43'

Stade Pater Te Hono Nui, Pirae
Attendance: 275
Referee: Beth Rattray (New Zealand)

=== Group B ===
Pos	Team	Pld	W	D	L	GF	GA	GD	Pts	Qualification
1	New Zealand	3	3	0	0	43	1	+42	9	Knockout stage
2	Fiji	3	2	0	1	16	7	+9	6	Knockout stage
3	Cook Islands	3	1	0	2	2	17	−15	3	5th place match
4	Vanuatu	3	0	0	3	4	40	−36	0	7th place match

Source: OFC
14 September 2023
16:00

New Zealand	12–0	Cook Islands
Teariki 6' (o.g.); Ardana 26'; Pivac 33'; De Wit 34'; Bennett 39', 45', 68', 79', 86'; Jerez 73'; Pugh 76'; Vlok 84'	Report

Stade Pater Te Hono Nui, Pirae
Attendance: 175
Referee: Tellos Kaufusi (Tonga)
14 September 2023
19:00

Fiji	11–3	Vanuatu
Theresa 2'; Kuladina 8', 55'; Tabunase 26', 48'; Ratulele 27', 79', 89'; Qalivere 50'; Tabua 86', 90+3'	Report	Tari 36'; Takau 68', 82'

Stade Pater Te Hono Nui, Pirae
Attendance: 248
Referee: Shama Maemae (Solomon Islands)

17 September 2023
16:00

New Zealand	4–1	Fiji
Bennett 27'; Jerez 40'; Young 50'; Vlok 52' (pen.)	Report	Qalivere 74'

Stade Pater Te Hono Nui, Pirae
Attendance: 179
Referee: Pari Oito (Tahiti)
17 September 2023
19:00

Vanuatu	1–2	Cook Islands
Moses 71' (pen.)	Report	Enoka 34'; Kamikamica 68'

Stade Pater Te Hono Nui, Pirae
Attendance: 150
Referee: Gideon Mamuala (Solomon Islands)

20 September 2023
16:00

Vanuatu	0–27	New Zealand
	Report	Pivac 3', 8', 22', 33', 45', 69'; De Wit 6'; Ardana 14'; Young 19'; Jerez 20', 38', 58'; McGillivray 29'; Wanemut 45+3' (o.g.); Saxon 49'; Cleall-Harding 55', 66', 68', 76'; Bryant 60', 78'; Vlok 72', 81', 84', 90+5'; Bennett 83', 90+2'

Stade Pater Te Hono Nui, Pirae
Attendance: 170
Referee: Shama Maemae (Solomon Islands)
20 September 2023
19:00

Cook Islands	0–4	Fiji
	Report	Kuladina 13', 41'; Tabua 21'; Tabunase 37'

Stade Pater Te Hono Nui, Pirae
Attendance: 216
Referee: Tellos Kaufusi (Tonga)

== Placement matches ==
=== 7th place match ===
24 September 2023
11:00

Solomon Islands	12–1	Vanuatu
Kini 15', 24', 39', 45+1', 46', 54'; Maetoloa 22'; Oritaimae 52', 65', 70', 76'; Toby 80'	Report	Carlot 61'

FTF Academy, Pirae
Attendance: 87
Referee: Torika Delai (Fiji)

=== 5th place match ===
24 September 2023
15:00

New Caledonia	8–0	Cook Islands
Wahnawe 15', 30', 50'; Naaoutchoue 21', 40'; Bako 63'; Hmaen 68'; Gotie 86'	Report

FTF Academy, Pirae
Attendance: 150
Referee: Beth Rattray (New Zealand)

== Knockout stage ==
Semi-finals
23 September
Tahiti	2 (2)
Fiji (p)	2 (3)
23 September
New Zealand	7
Tonga	0

Final
26 September
Fiji	0
New Zealand	1
Third place match
26 September
Tahiti	5
Tonga	3

=== Semi-finals ===
23 September 2023
16:00

Tahiti	2–2 (a.e.t.)	Fiji
Tupahururu 41'; Teikiotiu 83'	Report	Tabunase 23' (pen.); Laulaba 56'
Penalties
Kautai (penalty missed); Teikiotiu (penalty missed); Gendron (penalty scored); Masingue (penalty scored); Dehors (penalty missed)	2–3	Singh (penalty missed); Theresa (penalty missed); Laulaba (penalty scored); Tabunase (penalty scored); Kuladina (penalty scored)

Stade Pater Te Hono Nui, Pirae
Attendance: 350
Referee: Gideon Mamuala (Solomon Islands)
23 September 2023
19:00

New Zealand	7–0	Tonga
Pivac 8'; Pugh 35'; Vlok 48' (pen.); Jerez 53'; Bennett 53', 59'; De Wit 71'	Report

Stade Pater Te Hono Nui, Pirae
Attendance: 265
Referee: Shama Maemae (Solomon Islands)

=== Third place match ===
26 September 2023
16:00

Tahiti	5–3	Tonga
Le Gayic 18', 42', 45+5', 45+6'; Kautai 36'	Report	Faletau 8'; Pongi 82'; Falekakala 89'

Stade Pater Te Hono Nui, Pirae
Attendance: 523
Referee: Beth Rattray (New Zealand)

=== Final ===
26 September 2023
19:00

Fiji	0–1	New Zealand
	Report	Pugh 90+4'

Stade Pater Te Hono Nui, Pirae
Attendance: 711
Referee: Shama Maemae (Solomon Islands)

== Winners ==
2023 OFC U-16 Women's Championship

New Zealand
Fifth title

== Qualified teams for FIFA U-17 Women's World Cup 2024 ==
The following team from OFC qualified for the 2024 FIFA U-17 Women's World Cup in the Dominican Republic.

Teams	Qualified on	Previous appearances in FIFA U-17 Women's World Cup^{1}
New Zealand	26 September 2023	7 (2008, 2010, 2012, 2014, 2016, 2018, 2022)

^{1} Bold indicates champions for that year. Italic indicates hosts for that year.

== Goalscorers ==
There were 125 goals scored in 18 matches, for an average of 6.94 goals per match.

10 goals

- (New Zealand) Laura Bennett

8 goals

- (New Zealand) Angela Pivac
- (Solomon Islands) Gracester Kini

7 goals

- (New Zealand) Pia Vlok
- (Tonga) Tamaa Faletau

6 goals

- (New Zealand) Ela Jerez

5 goals

- (French Polynesia) Haranui Le Gayic

4 goals

- (Fiji) Sisilia Tuvou Kuladina
- (Fiji) Elesi Tabunase
- (New Caledonia) Henako Wahnawe
- (New Zealand) Isla Cleall-Harding
- (Solomon Islands) Gertrude Oritaimae

3 goals

- (Fiji) Luse Ratulele
- (Fiji) Kasanita Tabua
- (New Zealand) Amber De Wit
- (New Zealand) Katie Pugh

2 goals

- (Fiji) Caroline Qalivere
- (New Caledonia) Aziliz Naaoutchoue
- (New Zealand) Putri Ardana
- (New Zealand) Mackenzie Bryant
- (New Zealand) Natalie Young
- (French Polynesia) Willany Kautai
- (French Polynesia) Turere Tupahururu
- (Tonga) Anna Pongi
- (Vanuatu) Morin Takau

1 goal

- (Cook Islands) Abrihana Enoka
- (Cook Islands) Anna Kamikamica
- (Fiji) Seruwaia Laulaba
- (Fiji) Makereta Theresa
- (New Caledonia) Matha Bako
- (New Caledonia) Wadro Gotie
- (New Caledonia) Alofa Hmaen
- (New Caledonia) Julia Honakoko
- (New Caledonia) Cina Kourevi
- (New Zealand) Kara McGillivray
- (New Zealand) Hannah Saxon
- (Solomon Islands) Primrose Maetoloa
- (Solomon Islands) Joy Toby
- (French Polynesia) Lydie Gendron
- (French Polynesia) Nora Leodolter
- (French Polynesia) Tihiura Tahutini
- (French Polynesia) Fetia Teikiotiu
- (Tonga) Mele Falekakala
- Tema Tonga
- (Vanuatu) Keren Carlot
- (Vanuatu) Philles Moses
- (Vanuatu) Valerie Tari

1 own goal

- (Cook Islands) Maara Teariki (against New Zealand)
- (Vanuatu) Lea Wanemut (against New Zealand)

== Final standing ==
Rank	Team	Pld	W	D	L
1st place, gold medalist(s)	New Zealand	5	5	0	0
2nd place, silver medalist(s)	Fiji	5	2	1	2
3rd place, bronze medalist(s)	Tahiti	5	3	2	0
4	Tonga	5	1	1	3
5	New Caledonia	4	1	3	0
6	Cook Islands	4	1	0	3
7	Solomon Islands	4	1	1	2
8	Vanuatu	4	0	0	4
