= Fiji women's national under-17 football team =

Football team

Fiji Women's U-17
- Nickname: Bula Girls
- Association: Fiji Football Association
- Confederation: OFC (Oceania)
- Top scorer: Cema Nasau (5)
- Home stadium: ANZ National Stadium
- FIFA code: FIJ
| First colours | Second colours |

First international
- Cook Islands 0–3 Fiji (Matavera, Cook Islands; 14 January 2016)

Biggest win
- Fiji 11–3 Vanuatu (Pirae, Tahiti; 14 September 2023)

Biggest defeat
- New Zealand 11–0 Fiji (Matavera, Cook Islands; 21 January 2016)

World Cup
- Appearances: 0

OFC U-17 Women's Championship
- Appearances: 4 (first in 2016)
- Best result: Runners-up (2023)

The Fiji women's national under-17 football team is the second highest women's youth team of women's football in Fiji and is controlled by the Fiji Football Association.

== History ==
Fiji participated twice so far in the OFC U-17 Women's Championship. This was in 2016 and 2017. The 2016 tournament was a big success for Fiji as they managed to reach third place out of nine teams participating. They managed to get a 3–0 win against the Cook Islands, a 3–2 win against Vanuatu and a 2–2 draw against Papua New Guinea. These results sent them to the semi-final where they lost by 11 goals to 0 against New Zealand. In the Third place match however they managed to get a 3–2 victory against New Caledonia. Aliza Hussein managed to score the first goal ever for Fiji against the Cook Islands. Cema Nassau is the top goal scorer with five goals. In 2017, they also got Third Place.

=== OFC Competition History ===
The OFC Women's Under 17 Qualifying Tournament is a tournament held once every two years to decide the only qualification spot for Oceania Football Confederation (OFC) and representatives at the FIFA U-17 World Cup.

OFC U-17 Women's Championship
| Year | Round | Pld | W | D | L | GF | GA |
|---|---|---|---|---|---|---|---|
| (New Zealand) 2010 | Did not Participate | | | | | | |
| (New Zealand) 2012 | Did not Participate | | | | | | |
| (Cook Islands) 2016 | Third Place | 5 | 2 | 1 | 2 | 10 | 18 |
| (Samoa) 2017 | Semifinals | 4 | 2 | 1 | 1 | 8 | 5 |
| (French Polynesia) 2023 | Runners-up | 5 | 2 | 1 | 2 | 18 | 10 |
| (Fiji) 2024 | Fifth place | 4 | 2 | 1 | 1 | 6 | 4 |
| Total | 4/6 | 18 | 8 | 4 | 6 | 42 | 37 |

== Current technical staff ==
| Position | |
|---|---|
| Head coach | (Fiji) Marika Rodu |
| Assistant Coach | (Fiji) Annabel Rao |
| Assistant Coach | (Fiji) Laisani Mataele |
| Physio | (Fiji) Sarote Nakaora |
| Team Manager | (Fiji) Tulia Cawa |
| Head of Delegation | (Fiji) Susan Wise |

== Current squad ==
-Melania keresoni (Goalkeeper)

-kinisimere manisega (Defender)

-Khushi Zaiesha Lal (midfiler)

-Tarusila Qerewaqa Maivunidawa(forward)

-Akanini Katonitabua (?)

-Teonila Levuiciva (?)

-Kalisi Dama (?)

-Adi Reva (?)
