= OFC U-16 Women's Championship =

- Founded: 2010
- Region: Oceania (OFC)
- Teams: varies
- Current champions: New Zealand (8th title)
- Most championships: New Zealand (8 titles)
- 2026 OFC U-16 Women's Championship

The OFC U-16 Women's Championship (previously the OFC U-17 Women's Championship or OFC Women's Under 17 Qualifying Tournament) an Oceanic association football tournament held to determine the team that will appear in the Women's U-17 World Cup. The competition is organised by the Oceania Football Confederation (OFC) and was first held in 2010.

There was no OFC qualifying tournament to the first world cup in 2008, as New Zealand classified automatically as hosts.

The inaugural edition, held in New Zealand from 12 to 14 April 2010, was a group stage contested by only 4 of OFC's 11 teams to fill the only spot for the 2010 FIFA U-17 Women's World Cup. It was won by New Zealand, who won all their games without conceding a goal. The 2016 edition was the first to play a knock-out stage. New Zealand won its third title.

The edition held in August 2017 was an under-16 edition, and the tournament was called the OFC U-16 Women's Championship, and so were all the other editions since 2023.

== Tournaments ==
Because the 2014 World Cup was already held in March, no sufficient early date could be found for the OFC qualifier. The tournament was cancelled and New Zealand sent to the World Cup by default.

=== U17 format ===
Year	Host	Final			Third place match		
Year	Host	Champions	Score	Runners-up	Third place	Score	Fourth place
2010 details	New Zealand	New Zealand	Group stage	Solomon Islands	Papua New Guinea	Group stage	Tonga
2012 details	New Zealand	New Zealand	Group stage	Papua New Guinea	Cook Islands	Group stage	New Caledonia
2016 details	Cook Islands	New Zealand	8–0	Papua New Guinea	Fiji	3–2	New Caledonia
2020 details	Tahiti	Cancelled due to COVID-19 pandemic					
2022 details	Tahiti	Cancelled due to COVID-19 pandemic					

=== U16 format ===
Year	Host	Final			Third place match		
Year	Host	Champions	Score	Runners-up	Third place	Score	Fourth place
2017 details	Samoa	New Zealand	6–0	New Caledonia	Semifinalists: Cook Islands and Fiji		
2023 details	Tahiti	New Zealand	1–0	Fiji	Tahiti	5–3	Tonga
2024 details	Fiji	New Zealand	4–0	Samoa	Tonga	1–0	New Caledonia
2025 details	Samoa	New Zealand	3–0	Samoa	New Caledonia	9–0	Solomon Islands
2026 details	Solomon Islands	New Zealand	4–0	New Caledonia	Fiji	6–1	Papua New Guinea

== Performances by countries ==
Team	Winners	Runners-up	Third-place	Fourth-place	Losing semifinalists	Total (top four)
New Zealand	8 (2010, 2012, 2016, 2017, 2023, 2024, 2025, 2026)					8
New Caledonia		2 (2017, 2026)	1 (2025)	3 (2012, 2016, 2024)		6
Papua New Guinea		2 (2012, 2016)	1 (2010)	1 (2026)		4
Samoa		2 (2024, 2025)				2
Fiji		1 (2023)	2 (2016, 2026)		1 (2017)	4
Solomon Islands		1 (2010)		1 (2025)		2
Tonga			1 (2024)	2 (2010, 2023)		3
Cook Islands			1 (2012)		1 (2017)	2
Tahiti			1 (2023)			1
Total	8	8	7	7	2	32

== Awards ==
Tournament	Most Valuable Player	Top goalscorer(s)	Goals	Golden Golves	Fair play award
2010		(New Zealand) Hannah Wong	8	Not awarded	Not awarded
2012	(New Zealand) Briar Palmer	(New Zealand) Hannah Carlsen (New Zealand) Jasmine Pereira	6	(Cook Islands) Moeroa Nootai	New Zealand
2016	(New Zealand) Michaela Foster	(New Zealand) Hannah Blake	14	(Fiji) Francine Lockington	Cook Islands
2017	(New Zealand) Maya Hahn	(New Zealand) Kelli Brown	14	(New Caledonia) Lorenza Hnamano	Tonga

== Champion's U-17 World Cup record ==
New Zealand qualified for all the editions of the FIFA U-17 Women's World Cup:

- In 2008, they receive an automatic berth as host.
- In both 2014 and 2022 editions, they qualified by default, as no OFC qualifier was held due to concerns about dates.
- For all the other editions, New Zealand qualified as Oceania champions.
- In 2018, New Zealand finished 3rd becoming their best ever finish at any edition.
- Beginning in 2025, Oceania will have two teams which will feature a team other than New Zealand for the first time.

Legend

- 1st – Champions
- 2nd – Runners-up
- 3rd – Third place
- 4th – Fourth place
- SF – Semifinals
- QF – Quarterfinals
- GS – Group stage
- – Hosts

Team	(New Zealand) 2008	(Trinidad and Tobago) 2010	(Azerbaijan) 2012	(Costa Rica) 2014	(Jordan) 2016	(Uruguay) 2018	(India) 2022	(Dominican Republic) 2024	(Morocco) 2025	(Morocco) 2026	(Morocco) 2027	Total
New Caledonia											Q	1
New Zealand	GS	GS	GS	GS	GS	3rd	GS	GS	GS	GS	Q	11
Samoa									GS	GS		2
