= New Caledonia women's national under-17 football team =

New Caledonia women's U17
- Association: Fédération Calédonienne de Football
- Confederation: OFC (Oceania)
- Head coach: (France) Matthieu Delcroix
- Most caps: Lucina Koindredi & Jackie Pahoa (10)
- Top scorer: Jackie Pahoa (9)
- Home stadium: Stade Numa-Daly Magenta
- FIFA code: NCL
First colours	Second colours

First international
- New Caledonia 0–1 Papua New Guinea (Auckland, New Zealand; 11 April 2012)

Biggest win
- New Caledonia 6–0 Samoa (Apia, Samoa; 5 August 2017)

Biggest defeat
- New Caledonia 1–13 New Zealand (Auckland, New Zealand; 11 April 2012)

World Cup
- Appearances: 1 (first in 2027)

OFC U-17 Women's Championship
- Appearances: 4 (first in 2012)
- Best result: Runners-up (2017)

The New Caledonia women's national under-17 football team is the second highest women's youth team of New Caledonia and is controlled by the Fédération Calédonienne de Football.

== OFC ==
The OFC Women's Under 17 Qualifying Tournament is a tournament held once every two years to decide the only qualification spot for Oceania Football Confederation (OFC) and representatives at the FIFA U-17 World Cup.

OFC U-17 Women's Championship
Year	Round	Pld	W	D	L	GF	GA
(New Zealand) 2010	Did not enter						
(New Zealand) 2012	Fourth place	3	0	0	3	1	17
(Cook Islands) 2016	Fourth place	5	2	0	3	13	17
OFC U-16 Women's Championship
Year	Round	Pld	W	D	L	GF	GA
(Samoa) 2017	Runners-up	5	3	0	2	12	16
(French Polynesia) 2023	Group stage	3	0	1	2	2	10
(Fiji) 2024	Fourth place	5	2	0	3	5	13
Total	Runners-up	21	7	1	13	33	73

== Current technical staff ==
Position	
Head coach	(France) Matthieu Delcroix
Assistant Coach	(France) Charlotte Pelletier
Head of Delegation	(New Caledonia) Jules Hmeun

== Squad for the 2016 OFC U-17 Women's Championship ==
Caps and goals correct after the match against Fiji on January 23, 2016.

No.	Pos.	Player	Date of birth (age)	Caps	Goals	Club
1	GK	Karine Xozame	15 November 1999 (age 26)	4	0	
20	GK	Kathleen Waunie	7 August 1999 (age 27)	1	0	
2	DF	Darnelle Hace	16 October 2000 (age 25)	3	0	
3	DF	Flaureen Kaleine Vaitiare Ausu	29 April 2001 (age 25)	4	0	
4	DF	Mune Bako	27 March 1999 (age 27)	5	0	
5	DF	Ami-Nata Ajapuhnya	11 March 1999 (age 27)	5	0	
13	DF	Oceane Zasina		1	0	
15	DF	Justine Malaxan	20 March 2001 (age 25)	2	0	(New Caledonian Football Federation) Ne Drehu
19	DF	Dregan Leme	9 August 2001 (age 25)	4	1	
6	MF	Isabelle Ilengo	29 July 2000 (age 26)	5	0	
7	MF	Elise Mylene Lalie	28 August 1999 (age 27)	5	1	
8	MF	Jackie Pahoa	5 November 2001 (age 24)	5	6	(New Caledonian Football Federation) Mont-Dore
10	MF	Marie-Laure Palene	16 July 2001 (age 25)	4	0	(New Caledonian Football Federation) Paita
14	MF	Ivonne Xowi	22 July 2000 (age 26)	5	0	
16	MF	Jessica Ali Said	3 May 2001 (age 25)	3	1	
17	MF	Nancy Cassandra Nyadoun	10 November 2001 (age 24)	2	0	
9	FW	Shaya Ihmeling	9 January 1999 (age 27)	2	0	
11	FW	Cassidy Cawa	5 April 2000 (age 26)	3	0	
12	FW	Lucinda Koindredi	2 March 2001 (age 25)	5	1	(New Caledonian Football Federation) Paita
18	FW	Katinka Takamatsu	20 February 2001 (age 25)	3	3	(New Caledonian Football Federation) Paita
