= Tahiti women's national under-17 football team =

Tahiti Women's U-17
- Nickname: Toa Aito (Les guerriers de fer / Iron Warriors)
- Association: Tahitian Football Federation
- Confederation: OFC (Oceania)
- Head coach: (France) Stephanie Spielmann
- Most caps: 12 players with 3 caps
- Top scorer: Heipua Kohueinui (2)
- Home stadium: Stade Hamuta
- FIFA code: TAH
First colours	Second colours

First international
- Tahiti 1–17 New Zealand (Apia, Samoa; August 5, 2017)

Biggest win
- Solomon Islands 0–4 Tahiti (Pirae, Tahiti; 16 September 2023)

Biggest defeat
- Tahiti 1–17 New Zealand (Apia, Samoa; August 5, 2017)

World Cup
- Appearances: 0

OFC U-17 Women's Championship
- Appearances: 3 (first in 2017)
- Best result: Third Place 2023

The Tahiti women's national under-17 football team is the second highest women's youth team of women's football in French Polynesia. The team consists of a selection of players from French Polynesia, not just Tahiti. The team is controlled by the Tahitian Football Federation.

== History ==
Tahiti never participated in the OFC U-17 Women's Championship so far. However, in 2017 they will participate for the first time.

=== OFC ===
The OFC Women's Under 17 Qualifying Tournament is a tournament held once every two years to decide the only qualification spot for Oceania Football Confederation (OFC) and representatives at the FIFA U-17 World Cup.

OFC Women's Under 17 Qualifying Tournament
Year	Round	Pld	W	D	L	GF	GA
(New Zealand) 2010	Did not Participate						
(New Zealand) 2012	Did not Participate						
(Cook Islands) 2016	Did not Participate						
(Samoa) 2017	Group stage	3	0	0	3	2	23
(French Polynesia) 2023	Third Place	5	3	2	0	13	6
(Fiji) 2024	Seventh place	4	1	0	3	2	1
Total	3/6	12	4	2	6	17	30

== Current technical staff ==
Position	
Head coach	(France) Stephanie Spielmann
Assistant Coach	(French Polynesia) Jeanne Mahiatapu
Goalkeeper Coach	(French Polynesia) Xavier Samin
Physio	(France) Coraline Olszowy
Head of Delegation	(French Polynesia) Angela Taiarui
