= Briar Palmer =

New Zealand footballer

Personal information
- Full name: Briar Palmer
- Date of birth: 1 July 1995 (age 31)
- Place of birth: New Zealand
- Height: 1.64 m (5 ft 5 in)
- Position: Forward

Team information
- Current team: Melbourne Victory
- Number: 5

Senior career*
Years	Team	Apps	(Gls)
2015	Melbourne Victory	8	(0)

International career^{‡}
2012	New Zealand U-17	3	(0)
2014	New Zealand U-20	4	(0)
- * Club domestic league appearances and goals ‡ National team caps and goals as of 10:32, 16 June 2015 (UTC)

Briar Palmer (born 1 July 1995) is a New Zealand football striker who plays for Melbourne Victory in the W-League, the top-division women's soccer league in Australia.

== Playing career ==
=== Club ===
Palmer signed with Melbourne Victory for the 2015–16 W-League season. She made her debut for the club during the team's first match of the season on 17 October 2015. Palmer made eight appearances for the club with five starts during the 2015–16 W-League season. The Victory finished in ninth place with a 2–9–1 record.

=== International ===
Palmer has represented New Zealand at the under-17 and under-20 levels, including at the 2012 FIFA U-17 Women's World Cup and 2014 FIFA U-20 Women's World Cup. At the 2012 OFC Women's Under 17 Qualifying Tournament, she scored two goals against Cook Islands helping New Zealand win 7–0.
