= Stéphanie Spielmann =

French football manager (born 1983)

Personal information
- Date of birth: 12 June 1983
- Place of birth: Obernai, France

Managerial career
- Years: Team
- Tahiti

Stéphanie Spielmann (born 12 June 1983) is a French football player and manager who manages the Tahiti women's national team.

== Early life ==
Spielmann is from Obernai in Bas-Rhin.

== Career ==
Spielmann previously played for FC Vendenheim. Since 2014 she has managed Tahiti women's national team.
