= Vaitele =

- Village
- Location within Samoa
- Coordinates: 13°49′50″S 171°47′55″W
- Country: Samoa
- District: Tuamasaga

Population (2016)
  - Total: 7,972
- Time zone: UTC+13 (since 31 December 2011)

Vaitele is a town on the Samoan island of Upolu. It is located on the central-north coast of the island, to the west of the capital Apia. It’s not to be confused with the far smaller Vailele. Its neighboring villages are Vaigaga, Elisefou, Vaiusu, Talimatau, Vailoa, and Emau.

Vaitele has an estimated population of 7,972 according to the 2016 census.
