= 2017 OFC U-16 Women's Championship =

Tournament details
- Host country: Samoa
- City: Apia
- Dates: 4–18 August 2017
- Teams: 8 (from 1 confederation)
- Venue: 1 (in 1 host city)

Final positions
- Champions: New Zealand (4th title)
- Runners-up: New Caledonia

Tournament statistics
- Matches played: 15
- Goals scored: 89 (5.93 per match)
- Attendance: 2,550 (170 per match)
- Top scorer: (New Zealand) Kelli Brown (14 goals)
- Best player: (New Zealand) Maya Hahn
- Best goalkeeper: (New Caledonia) Lorenza Hnamano
- Fair play award: Tonga

The 2017 OFC U-16 Women's Championship was the 4th edition of the OFC U-16/U-17 Women's Championship, the biennial international youth football championship organised by the Oceania Football Confederation (OFC) for the women's under-16/under-17 national teams of Oceania. The tournament was held in Samoa between 4 and 18 August 2017.

For this tournament the age limit was lowered from under-17 to under-16. The winners of the tournament qualified for the 2018 FIFA U-17 Women's World Cup in Uruguay as the OFC representative.

== Teams ==
All eleven OFC member national teams entered the tournament. It would be the first time in the history of the OFC U-17 Women's Championship that all eleven members of the OFC take part in the tournament. However, Papua New Guinea, Solomon Islands and Vanuatu later withdrew from the tournament, so only eight teams would take part.

Team	Appearance	Previous best performance
American Samoa	1st	Debut
Cook Islands	3rd	Third place (2012)
Fiji	2nd	Third place (2016)
New Caledonia	3rd	Fourth place (2012, 2016)
New Zealand	4th	Champions (2010, 2012, 2016)
Samoa (hosts)	2nd	Group stage (2016)
Tahiti	1st	Debut
Tonga	3rd	4th place (2010)

Withdrew

- Papua New Guinea
- Solomon Islands
- Vanuatu

== Venue ==
The matches were played at the J.S. Blatter Football Complex in Apia.

== Squads ==
Players born on or after 1 January 2001 were eligible to compete in the tournament. Each team could name a maximum of 20 players.

== Group stage ==
The draw for the group stage was held on 29 June 2017 at the OFC Headquarters in Auckland, New Zealand. The eleven teams were drawn into one group of six teams (Group A) and one group of five teams (Group B). Based on results of the previous three editions, New Zealand and Papua New Guinea were seeded into one pot and drawn into either Group A or B, while the remaining nine teams were placed in another pot and drawn into any of the remaining five spots in Group A or the remaining four spots in Group B.

After the withdrawal of Vanuatu in Group A, and Solomon Islands and Papua New Guinea in Group B, Group A was left with five teams and Group B was left with three teams. A draw was held on 29 July 2017 at the OFC Headquarters in Auckland, New Zealand, which saw Tonga moved from Group A to Group B so that both teams would have four teams. The tournament schedule was also revised and would end one week earlier, with the semi-finals and final now played on 15 and 18 August instead of 22 and 25 August.

Each group was played in round-robin format. The top two teams of each group advanced to the semi-finals.

All times were local, WST (UTC+13).

=== Group A ===
Pos	Team	Pld	W	D	L	GF	GA	GD	Pts	Qualification
1	New Zealand	3	3	0	0	32	1	+31	9	Knockout stage
2	New Caledonia	3	2	0	1	8	8	0	6	Knockout stage
3	Samoa (H)	3	1	0	2	4	14	−10	3	
4	Tahiti	3	0	0	3	2	23	−21	0	

Source: OFC
(H) Hosts
5 August 2017
14:00

Samoa	0–6	New Caledonia
	Report	Takamatsu 30', 51', 65'; Matao 40'; Tuimavave 54' (o.g.); Pahoa 88'

J.S. Blatter Football Complex (Field 1), Apia
Attendance: 300
Referee: Torika Delai (Fiji)
5 August 2017
17:00

Tahiti	1–17	New Zealand
Kohueinui 13'	Report	Brown 3', 5', 10', 12', 41', 45', 87'; Maynard 17', 20', 52'; Wisnewski 38', 50', 53'; Hahn 45+2'; Jenkins 47', 72'; Jensen 90+1'

J.S. Blatter Football Complex (Field 1), Apia
Attendance: 100
Referee: Sione Mau (American Samoa)

8 August 2017
14:00

New Zealand	7–0	New Caledonia
Jensen 17'; Wisnewski 24'; Jenkins 45+2', 61', 87'; Cunningham-Lee 54'; Brown 75'	Report

J.S. Blatter Football Complex (Field 2), Apia
Attendance: 100
Referee: Tapaita Lelenga (Tonga)
8 August 2017
17:00

Tahiti	0–4	Samoa
	Report	Sataraka 12'; Ah Ki 32'; Uiagalelei 65'; Ruby 85'

J.S. Blatter Football Complex (Field 1), Apia
Attendance: 300
Referee: Talalelei Faalavaau (American Samoa)

12 August 2017
14:00

New Zealand	8–0	Samoa
Brown 37', 84', 90'; Jenkins 56', 58'; Stewart 45', 73'; Fraser 83'	Report

J.S. Blatter Football Complex (Field 1), Apia
Attendance: 200
Referee: Tapaita Lelenga (Tonga)
12 August 2017
17:00

New Caledonia	2–1	Tahiti
Pahoa 46'; Palene 56'	Report	Kohueinui 41'

J.S. Blatter Football Complex (Field 1), Apia
Attendance: 100
Referee: Torika Delai (Fiji)

=== Group B ===
Pos	Team	Pld	W	D	L	GF	GA	GD	Pts	Qualification
1	Fiji	3	2	1	0	6	1	+5	7	Knockout stage
2	Cook Islands	3	2	0	1	7	3	+4	6	Knockout stage
3	Tonga	3	1	1	1	7	4	+3	4	
4	American Samoa	3	0	0	3	2	14	−12	0	

Source: OFC
4 August 2017
14:00

American Samoa	1–4	Fiji
Naolavoa 71'	Report	Sinukula 11', 21'; Buke 18'; V. Bainivalu 60'

J.S. Blatter Football Complex (Field 2), Apia
Attendance: 150
Referee: Rani Perry (Tahiti)
4 August 2017
17:00

Cook Islands	3–1	Tonga
Taringa 13'; Viking 29', 31'	Report	Polovili 86'

J.S. Blatter Football Complex (Field 1), Apia
Attendance: 200
Referee: Ben Aukwai (Solomon Islands)

7 August 2017
14:00

Fiji	0–0	Tonga
	Report

J.S. Blatter Football Complex (Field 2), Apia
Attendance: 100
Referee: Arnold Tari (Vanuatu)
7 August 2017
17:00

American Samoa	0–4	Cook Islands
	Report	Tatuava 4'; Murare 20' (pen.), 76' (pen.); Taringa 51'

J.S. Blatter Football Complex (Field 1), Apia
Attendance: 200
Referee: Fina Angelo (Vanuatu)

11 August 2017
14:00

Tonga	6–1	American Samoa
Lutu 17', 85'; Feke 24'; Polovili 37'; Taukapo 72'; Talasinga 73'	Report	Tofaeono 45+2'

J.S. Blatter Football Complex (Field 2), Apia
Attendance: 100
Referee: Fina Angelo (Vanuatu)
11 August 2017
17:00

Fiji	2–0	Cook Islands
Sinukula 24'; Drodrolagi 90+1' (pen.)	Report

J.S. Blatter Football Complex (Field 1), Apia
Attendance: 200
Referee: Rani Perry (Tahiti)

== Knockout stage ==
=== Bracket ===
Semi-finals
15 August – Apia
New Zealand	9
Cook Islands	0
15 August – Apia
Fiji	2
New Caledonia	4

Final
18 August – Apia
New Zealand	6
New Caledonia	0

=== Semi-finals ===
15 August 2017
17:00

New Zealand	9–0	Cook Islands
Brown 18', 31', 34'; Jenkins 27', 28'; Hahn 37' (pen.); Ramsay 40'; Stewart 61'; Wisnewski 79'	Report

J.S. Blatter Football Complex (Field 1), Apia
Attendance: 150
Referee: Ben Aukwai (Solomon Islands)

15 August 2017
20:00

Fiji	2–4	New Caledonia
Rokociri 67'; Lagilevu 87'	Report	Ihage 47'; Pahoa 50'; Takamatsu 64'; Matao 78'

J.S. Blatter Football Complex (Field 1), Apia
Attendance: 100
Referee: Sione Mau (American Samoa)

=== Final ===
Winner qualified for 2018 FIFA U-17 Women's World Cup.

18 August 2017
17:00

New Zealand	6–0	New Caledonia
Maynard 27', 51', 66', 68'; Iekawe 62' (o.g.); Wisnewski 72'	Report

J.S. Blatter Football Complex (Field 1), Apia
Attendance: 250
Referee: Tapaita Lelenga (Tonga)

== Winners ==
2017 OFC U-16 Women's Championship

**New Zealand**
**Fourth title**

The following team from OFC qualified for the 2018 FIFA U-17 Women's World Cup.

Team	Qualified on	Previous appearances in FIFA U-17 Women's World Cup^{1}
New Zealand	18 August 2017	5 (2008, 2010, 2012, 2014, 2016)

^{1} Bold indicates champions for that year. Italic indicates hosts for that year.

== Awards ==
The following awards were given at the conclusion of the tournament.

Award	Player
Golden Ball	(New Zealand) Maya Hahn
Golden Boot	(New Zealand) Kelli Brown
Golden Gloves	(New Caledonia) Lorenza Hnamano
Fair Play Award	Tonga

== Goalscorers ==
14 goals

- (New Zealand) Kelli Brown

9 goals

- (New Zealand) Maggie Jenkins

7 goals

- (New Zealand) Arabella Maynard

6 goals

- (New Zealand) Grace Wisnewski

4 goals

- (New Caledonia) Katinka Takamatsu

3 goals

- (Fiji) Eseta Sinukula
- (New Caledonia) Jackie Pahoa
- (New Zealand) Jayda Stewart

2 goals

- (Cook Islands) Piri Murare
- (Cook Islands) Ngametua Taringa
- (Cook Islands) Nathalia Viking
- (New Caledonia) Edsy Matao
- (New Zealand) Maya Hahn
- (New Zealand) Aniela Jensen
- (French Polynesia) Heipua Kohueinui
- (Tonga) Seini Lutu
- (Tonga) Ana Polovili

1 goal

- (American Samoa) Elcy Naolavoa
- (American Samoa) Oloataua Tofaeono
- (Cook Islands) Tehinnah Tatuava
- (Fiji) Vani Bainivalu
- (Fiji) Viniana Buke
- (Fiji) Dilaisana Drodrolagi
- (Fiji) Lusiana Lagilevu
- (Fiji) Emily Rokociri
- (New Caledonia) Fiona Ihage
- (New Caledonia) Marie-Laure Palene
- (New Zealand) Britney Cunningham-Lee
- (New Zealand) Macey Fraser
- (New Zealand) Margot Ramsay
- (Samoa) Madeleen Ah Ki
- (Samoa) Zoe Ruby
- (Samoa) Sina Sataraka
- (Samoa) Nagem Uiagalelei
- (Tonga) Lositika Feke
- (Tonga) Siunipa Talasinga
- (Tonga) Litea Taukapo

1 own goal

- (New Caledonia) Melissa Iekawe (against New Zealand)
- (Samoa) Tiare Tuimavave (against New Caledonia)
