= Edna Thomas (footballer) =

Papua New Guinean football player and manager

Senior career*
Years	Team	Apps	(Gls)
- Bara

International career^{‡}
2010	Papua New Guinea	5	(0)
- * Club domestic league appearances and goals ‡ National team caps and goals as of 8 October 2010.

Edna “Eddy” Thomas is a Papua New Guinean former footballer and current manager. She has been a member of the Papua New Guinea women's national team.

== Club career ==
Thomas has played for Bara in Papua New Guinea.

== International career ==
Thomas capped for Papua New Guinea at senior level during the 2010 OFC Women's Championship.
