= Kate Loye =

New Zealand footballer

Personal information
- Full name: Kate Margaret Loye
- Date of birth: 15 May 1993 (age 33)
- Place of birth: Auckland, New Zealand
- Height: 1.66 m (5 ft 5 in)
- Position: Midfielder

International career^{‡}
Years	Team	Apps	(Gls)
2009–2010	New Zealand U17		
2011–2012	New Zealand U20		
2015–	New Zealand	1	(0)
- ‡ National team caps and goals as of 11:00, 13 June 2019 (UTC)

Kate Loye was born in Tamahere, New Zealand on 15 May 1993 and has represented New Zealand in association football at international level.

Loye was a member of the New Zealand U-17 side at the 2012 FIFA U-17 Women's World Cup in Trinidad and Tobago, and again at the 2012 FIFA U-20 Women's World Cup in Japan where they were eliminated at the group stages.

Loye made her senior début as a substitute in a 1–5 loss to Brazil on 1 December 2015.

== Honours ==
Individual

- Mainland Football Women's Midfielder of the Year: 2022, 2025, 2026
- Mainland Football Women's Player of the Year: 2025
