= Solomon Islands women's national under-17 football team =

Solomon Islands Women's U-17
- Association: Solomon Islands Football Federation
- Confederation: OFC (Oceania)
- Home stadium: Lawson Tama Stadium
- FIFA code: SOL
First colours	Second colours

First international
- New Zealand 10–0 Solomon Islands (Auckland, New Zealand; April 12, 2010)

Biggest win
- Tonga 0–5 Solomon Islands (Auckland, New Zealand; April 14, 2010)

Biggest defeat
- New Zealand 10–0 Solomon Islands (Auckland, New Zealand; April 12, 2010)

World Cup
- Appearances: 0

OFC U-17 Women's Championship
- Appearances: 2 (first in 2010)
- Best result: Second Place (2010)

The Solomon Islands women's national under-17 football team is the second highest women's youth team of women's football in the Solomon Islands and is controlled by the Solomon Islands Football Federation.

== History ==
The Solomon Islands participated one time so far in the OFC U-17 Women's Championship. This was in 2010 and it was the first time that the tournament was held. This tournament was a big success for the Solomon Islands as they managed to reach a second place after victory's against Tonga (5-0) and Papua New Guinea (1-0). In the end they lost against New Zealand (10-0). In 2016 they had the intention of participating for the second time in the tournament. However due to a financial crisis within the Football Federation there wasn't enough money, which meant that the team had to withdraw.

=== OFC ===
The OFC Women's Under 17 Qualifying Tournament is a tournament held once every two years to decide the only qualification spot for Oceania Football Confederation (OFC) and representatives at the FIFA U-17 World Cup.

OFC Women's Under 17 Qualifying Tournament
Year	Round	Pld	W	D	L	GF	GA
(New Zealand) 2010	Second Place	3	2	0	1	6	10
(New Zealand) 2012	Did not Participate						
(Cook Islands) 2016	Withdrew						
(Samoa) 2017	Withdrew						
(French Polynesia) 2023	Group stage	3	0	1	2	2	10
(Fiji) 2024	Sixth place	4	1	0	3	4	4
Total	3/6	10	3	1	6	12	24
