= Samoa women's national under-17 football team =

National association football team

Samoa Women's U-17
- Association: Football Federation Samoa
- Confederation: OFC (Oceania)
- Head coach: (Guatemala) Juan Chang Urrea
- Most caps: Madeleen Ah Ki (6)
- Top scorer: Sophia Aveau; Sina Sataraka; Madeleen Ah Ki; Nagem Uiagalelei; Zoe Ruby (1)
- Home stadium: National Soccer Stadium
- FIFA code: SAM
First colours	Second colours

First international
- New Zealand 11–0 Samoa (Matavera, Cook Islands; 13 January 2016)

Biggest win
- Papua New Guinea 0–11 Samoa (Auckland, New Zealand; 17 June 2024); American Samoa 0–11 Samoa (Auckland, New Zealand; 20 June 2024)

Biggest defeat
- United States 17–0 Samoa (Salé, Morocco; 19 October 2026)

OFC U-16 Women's Championship
- Appearances: 2 (first in 2016)
- Best result: Runners-up (2024)

FIFA U-17 Women's World Cup
- Appearances: 2 (first in 2025)
- Best result: Group stage (2025, 2026)

The Samoa women's national under-17 football team is the second highest women's youth team of women's football in Samoa. It is controlled by the Football Federation Samoa, the governing body for football in Samoa. The National Soccer Stadium (Samoa) in Apia is Samoa's home ground. It was known as the Western Samoa national football team until 1997. Samoa is a part of the FIFA Goal project.

== History ==
Samoa participated in the OFC U-16 Women's Championship in 2016 for the first time. It wasn't a huge success as the team suffered three heavy defeats. However, they managed to score a goal by Sophia Aveau against Tonga. The game ended in a 4–1 defeat but Samoa's first and only goal so far was scored. Their biggest success in the tournament was in 2024 when they reached the final. They will take part in the FIFA U-17 Women's World Cup for the first time ever in 2025 in Morocco, the first FIFA tournament finals played by the country.

== Competitive record ==
=== FIFA U-17 Women's World Cup ===
Year	Round	Pld	W	D	L	GF	GA
(New Zealand) 2008	Did not enter						
(Trinidad and Tobago) 2010	Did not enter						
(Azerbaijan) 2012	Did not enter						
(Costa Rica) 2014	Did not enter						
(Jordan) 2016	Did not qualify						
(Uruguay) 2018	Did not qualify						
(India) 2022	Did not qualify						
(Dominican Republic) 2024	Did not enter						
(Morocco) 2025	Group stage	3	0	0	3	2	14
(Morocco) 2026	Group Stage	3	0	0	3	0	28
(Morocco) 2027	Did not qualify						
(Morocco) 2028	To be determined						
(Morocco) 2029	To be determined						
Total	2/13	6	0	0	6	2	42

=== OFC ===
The OFC Women's Under 17 Qualifying Tournament is a tournament held once every two years to decide the only qualification spot for Oceania Football Confederation (OFC) and representatives at the FIFA U-17 World Cup.

OFC U-17 Women's Championship								Qualification record					
Year	Round	Pld	W	D	L	GF	GA	Pld	W	D	L	GF	GA
(New Zealand) 2010	Did not enter							No qualification					
(New Zealand) 2012	Did not enter							No qualification					
(Cook Islands) 2016	Group stage	3	0	0	3	1	20	No qualification					
OFC U-16 Women's Championship								Qualification record					
Year	Round	Pld	W	D	L	GF	GA	Pld	W	D	L	GF	GA
(Samoa) 2017	Group stage	3	1	0	2	4	14	No qualification					
(French Polynesia) 2023	Withdrew							No qualification					
(Fiji) 2024	Runners-up	5	4	0	1	15	4	2	2	0	0	22	0
Total	Runners-up	11	5	0	6	20	38	2	2	0	0	22	0

== Current technical staff ==
Position	
Head coach	(Guatemala) Juan Chang Urrea
Assistant Coach	(Samoa) Paul Ualesi
Technical Advisor	(Italy) Valerio Raccuglia
Goalkeeper Coach	(United States) Kristin Masunaga
Physio	(New Zealand) Tom Eminson
Team Manager	(Samoa) Tunufai Mano

== Current squad ==
The following players were called up for the 2025 FIFA U-17 Women's World Cup

No.	Pos.	Player	Date of birth (age)	Club
1	GK	Grace Ae	6 July 2008 (aged 17)	(United States Soccer Federation) LAFC So Cal Youth
2	FW	Cali Willis	24 June 2009 (aged 16)	(United States Soccer Federation) Liverpool FC
3	DF	Mikayla Afoa	21 July 2010 (aged 15)	(Football Australia) Queensland Academy of Sport
4	DF	Mia Afoa	11 February 2009 (aged 16)	(Football Australia) Brisbane City FC
5	MF	Taimane Devoux	7 July 2010 (aged 15)	Free agent
6	DF	Breanna Kitiona	9 January 2009 (aged 16)	(United States Soccer Federation) Ajax Utah FC
7	MF	Brielle Tautua	9 October 2010 (aged 15)	(United States Soccer Federation) Legends FC
8	MF	Leah Atuaia	7 October 2008 (aged 17)	(United States Soccer Federation) Utah Celtic FC
9	DF	Simone Blood	17 May 2008 (aged 17)	(New Zealand Football) Papakura City FC
10	MF	Macey Tuiolosega	6 March 2009 (aged 16)	(United States Soccer Federation) Slammers HB Køge
11	FW	Makea Leonard	11 March 2008 (aged 17)	(United States Soccer Federation) LAFC So Cal Youth
12	GK	Siatunuu McCarthy	2 September 2009 (aged 16)	(New Zealand Football) Papakura City FC
13	FW	Jayde Eldredge	6 March 2009 (aged 16)	(United States Soccer Federation) Leahi Soccer Club
14	FW	Holly Leapai	10 December 2008 (aged 16)	(Football Australia) Brisbane City FC
15	DF	Makeli Leonard	1 June 2009 (aged 16)	(United States Soccer Federation) LAFC So Cal Youth
16	DF	Alia Loua	21 March 2010 (aged 15)	(United States Soccer Federation) Seattle United
17	DF	Reyna Tufuga	19 December 2009 (aged 15)	(United States Soccer Federation) Beach FC
18	DF	Jhalilah Sio	25 September 2008 (aged 17)	(United States Soccer Federation) Sporting California USA
19	DF	Ayres Ava	28 May 2009 (aged 16)	(United States Soccer Federation) South Carolina United
20	DF	Imogen Panapa	5 January 2008 (aged 17)	(Football Australia) Queensland Lions FC
21	GK	Margaret Fagasuisui	12 May 2009 (aged 16)	(New Zealand Football) Manukau United FC

== Head-to-head record ==
The following table shows Samoa's head-to-head record in the FIFA U-17 Women's World Cup.

Opponent	Pld	W	D	L	GF	GA	GD	Win %
Canada	1	0	0	1	0	6	−6	0.00
France	1	0	0	1	2	4	−2	0.00
Nigeria	1	0	0	1	0	4	−4	0.00
Total	3	0	0	3	2	14	−12	0.00
