= Aliza Hussein =

Fijian footballer

Personal information
- Date of birth: 23 July 2000 (age 26)
- Position: Midfielder

Team information
- Current team: Ba

Senior career*
Years	Team	Apps	(Gls)
- Ba

International career^{‡}
2018–	Fiji	1	(0)
- * Club domestic league appearances and goals ‡ National team caps and goals as of 1 December 2018

Aliza Akshara Hussein (born 23 July 2000) is a Fijian footballer who plays as a midfielder for Ba FC and the Fiji women's national team.

Hussein is from Yalalevu. She started playing football at the age of five. She was recruited to Ba FC in 2014.

She was part of the team for the 2017 Pacific Mini Games.

In 2018, she was selected to the Fiji women's national football team for the 2018 OFC women's nations cup.
