= Cook Islands women's national under-17 football team =

National association youth football team

Cook Islands women's U17
- Nickname: The Cooks
- Association: Cook Islands; Football Association
- Confederation: OFC (Oceania)
- Head coach: (Cook Islands) Theresa Tatuava
- Captain: Ngametua Taringa
- Top scorer: Tepaeru Toka, Moeroa Harmon (3)
- FIFA code: COK
First colours	Second colours

First international
- New Zealand 7–0 Cook Islands (Māngere, New Zealand; 9 April 2012)

Biggest win
- American Samoa 0–10 Cook Islands (Port Moresby, Papua New Guinea; 18 April 2026)

Biggest defeat
- New Zealand 12–0 Cook Islands (Pirae, Tahiti; 14 September 2023)

World Cup
- Appearances: 0

OFC U-17 Women's Championship
- Appearances: 5
- Best result: Third Place (2012)

The Cook Islands women's national under-17 football team is the national U-17 team of the Cook Islands and is controlled by the Cook Islands Football Association. With a population of around 24,000 people it remains one of the smallest FIFA teams.

== History ==
The Cook Islands participated two times so far in the OFC U-17 Women's Championship, in 2012 and in 2016. In 2012 they managed to reach the third place, out of four participants. Tepaeru Toka was the big star as she managed to score three goals during that tournament. She also scored the Cook Islands first goal ever, in a 3–2 loss against Papua New Guinea. In 2016 they participated again. This time was less successful as they became third in the group and therefore missed qualification for the semi-final. Moeroa Harmon however managed to gain some recognition as she managed to score a hattrick in a 5–1 victory against Vanuatu.

== Competition Record ==
=== OFC ===
The OFC Women's Under 17 Qualifying Tournament is a tournament held once every two years to decide the only qualification spot for Oceania Football Confederation (OFC) and representatives at the FIFA U-17 World Cup.

OFC U-17 Women's Championship								Qualification record					
Year	Round	Pld	W	D	L	GF	GA	Pld	W	D	L	GF	GA
(New Zealand) 2010	Did not enter							No qualification					
(New Zealand) 2012	Third place	3	1	0	2	5	10	No qualification					
(Cook Islands) 2016	Group stage	3	1	0	2	6	6	No qualification					
OFC U-16 Women's Championship								Qualification record					
Year	Round	Pld	W	D	L	GF	GA	Pld	W	D	L	GF	GA
(Samoa) 2017	Semi-finals	4	2	0	2	7	12	No qualification					
(French Polynesia) 2023	Group stage	3	1	0	2	2	17	No qualification					
(Fiji) 2024	Group stage	4	4	0	4	1	2	Qualified automatically					
Total	5/6	16	9	0	12	21	47						

== Current technical staff ==
Position	
Head coach	(Cook Islands) Theresa Tatuava
Technical Adviser	(England) Jesse Ibrom
Physio	(New Zealand) Kendal De Besten
Team Manager	(Cook Islands) Merian Noovao

== See also ==
- Cook Islands women's national football team
- Cook Islands men's national football team
- Cook Islands men's national under-20 football team
- Cook Islands men's national under-17 football team
