= Maya Hahn =

New Zealand footballer (born 2001)

Personal information
- Full name: Maya Ruby Hahn
- Date of birth: 7 February 2001 (age 25)
- Place of birth: Wellington, New Zealand
- Height: 1.68 m (5 ft 6 in)
- Position: Midfielder

Team information
- Current team: Viktoria Berlin
- Number: 11

College career
Years	Team	Apps	(Gls)
2019–2021	Oregon Ducks	41	(3)

Senior career*
Years	Team	Apps	(Gls)
2020	SV Meppen	4	(0)
2022–2025	Turbine Potsdam	51	(4)
2023	Turbine Potsdam II	3	(0)
2025–	Viktoria Berlin	28	(1)

International career^{‡}
2018	New Zealand U17	6	(0)
2025–	New Zealand	12	(1)
- * Club domestic league appearances and goals as of 20 November 2026 ‡ National team caps and goals as of 23 May 2026.

Maya Ruby Hahn (born 7 February 2001) is a New Zealand footballer who plays as a midfielder for 2. Frauen-Bundesliga club Viktoria Berlin and the New Zealand national team.

== Early life ==
Hahn grew up speaking German. She was born and raised in Wellington, New Zealand.

== Education ==
Hahn attended the University of Oregon in the United States.

== Club career ==
=== Youth ===
Hahn joined the Ole Academy at the age of eight. In 2014, Hahn trained with the youth academy of German side FC Bayern Munich. Born in New Zealand, she was a Germany youth international.

=== Senior ===
In 2022, Hahn signed for German top flight side Turbine Potsdam, where she suffered relegation to the German second tier.

== International career ==
Hahn was awarded Best Player at the 2017 Oceania Under-16 Championship. She helped the New Zealand women's national under-17 football team achieve third place at the 2018 FIFA U-17 Women's World Cup.

== Style of play ==
Hahn has been described as a "ball-playing midfielder".

== Personal life ==
Hahn was born to a German father. She has a brother.

== Career statistics ==
=== International ===
Scores and results list the New Zealand' goal tally first, score column indicates score after each Hahn goal.

List of international goals scored by Maya Hahn
No.	Date	Venue	Opponent	Score	Result	Competition
1	25 February 2025	Estadio Alejandro Morera Soto, Alajuela, Costa Rica	Costa Rica	1–0	1–0	Friendly
