= 2016 OFC U-17 Women's Championship =

Tournament details
- Host country: Cook Islands
- City: Matavera
- Dates: 13–23 January 2016
- Teams: 9 (from 1 confederation)
- Venue: 2 (in 1 host city)

Final positions
- Champions: New Zealand (3rd title)
- Runners-up: Papua New Guinea
- Third place: Fiji
- Fourth place: New Caledonia

Tournament statistics
- Matches played: 16
- Goals scored: 107 (6.69 per match)
- Attendance: 5,300 (331 per match)
- Top scorer: (New Zealand) Hannah Blake (14 goals)
- Best player: (New Zealand) Michaela Foster
- Best goalkeeper: (Fiji) Francine Lockington
- Fair play award: Cook Islands

The 2016 OFC U-17 Women's Championship was the 3rd edition of the OFC U-17 Women's Championship, the biennial international youth football championship organised by the Oceania Football Confederation (OFC) for the women's under-17 national teams of Oceania. The tournament was held in the Cook Islands between 13 and 23 January 2016. The tournament, which returned after the previous edition in 2014 was cancelled, was originally scheduled to be held between 13 and 28 September 2015.

Same as previous editions, the tournament acted as the OFC qualifiers for the FIFA U-17 Women's World Cup. The winner of the tournament qualified for the 2016 FIFA U-17 Women's World Cup in Jordan as the OFC representative.

New Zealand were crowned as champions for the third consecutive time on 24 January 2016, sealing their qualification for the World Cup.

== Teams ==
A total of nine OFC member national teams entered the tournament.

| Team | Appearance | Previous best performance |
|---|---|---|
| Cook Islands (hosts) | 2nd | Third place (2012) |
| Fiji | 1st | Debut |
| New Caledonia | 2nd | Fourth place (2012) |
| New Zealand | 3rd | Champions (2010, 2012) |
| Papua New Guinea | 3rd | Runners-up (2012) |
| Samoa | 1st | Debut |
| Solomon Islands | 2nd | Runners-up (2010) |
| Tonga | 2nd | 4th place (2010) |
| Vanuatu | 1st | Debut |

Withdrew

- American Samoa
- Tahiti

== Venue ==
The matches were played at the CIFA Academy Field and Takitumu School in Matavera.

== Squads ==
Players born on or after 1 January 1999 were eligible to compete in the tournament.

== Group stage ==
The draw for the group stage was held on 19 October 2015 at the OFC Headquarters in Auckland, New Zealand. The nine teams were divided into one group of five teams and one group of four teams, with each group played in round-robin format. The top two teams of each group advance to the semi-finals.

After the withdrawal of the Solomon Islands from the tournament, the Group A fixtures were re-drawn on 3 November 2015 at the OFC Headquarters. As a result, the tournament also starts four days later from its original start date of 9 January 2016.

All times are local, CKT (UTC−10).

=== Group A ===
| Pos | Team | Pld | W | D | L | GF | GA | GD | Pts | Qualification |
|---|---|---|---|---|---|---|---|---|---|---|
| 1 | New Zealand | 3 | 3 | 0 | 0 | 36 | 0 | +36 | 9 | Knockout stage |
| 2 | New Caledonia | 3 | 2 | 0 | 1 | 10 | 12 | −2 | 6 | Knockout stage |
| 3 | Tonga | 3 | 1 | 0 | 2 | 4 | 19 | −15 | 3 | |
| 4 | Samoa | 3 | 0 | 0 | 3 | 1 | 20 | −19 | 0 | |
| 5 | Solomon Islands | 0 | 0 | 0 | 0 | 0 | 0 | 0 | 0 | Withdrew |

Source: OFC
13 January 2016
14:30

| New Caledonia | 5–0 | Tonga |
|---|---|---|
| Pahoa 3', 8'; Koindredi 71'; Lalie 79'; Ali Said 88' | Report |

CIFA Academy Field, Matavera
Attendance: 400
Referee: Tupou Patia (Cook Islands)
13 January 2016
17:00

| New Zealand | 11–0 | Samoa |
|---|---|---|
| Blake 1', 81', 90+6'; Jillings 7'; Hand 12', 20', 65'; Tawharu 35' ? 72' (o.g.); Krystman 85', 90+4' | Report |

CIFA Academy Field, Matavera
Attendance: 400
Referee: Nelson Sogo (Solomon Islands)

15 January 2016
14:30

| New Caledonia | 0–12 | New Zealand |
|---|---|---|
| | Report | Hand 29'; Jenkins 44', 45+2', 90+3' (pen.); Main 46'; Blake 49', 70', 71'; Jillings 52'; Foster 56' (pen.); Bunge 67'; Tawharu 90+5' |

CIFA Academy Field, Matavera
Attendance: 300
Referee: Finau Vulivuli (Fiji)
15 January 2016
17:00

| Samoa | 1–4 | Tonga |
|---|---|---|
| Aveau 45+1' | Report | Fifita 22'; Lutu 43'; Kafa 55'; Polovili 84' (pen.) |

CIFA Academy Field, Matavera
Attendance: 150
Referee: Robinson Banga (Vanuatu)

18 January 2016
14:00

| Tonga | 0–13 | New Zealand |
|---|---|---|
| | Report | Blake 5', 15', 55'; Jenkins 12', 24', 28', 84'; Main 36', 43'; Tawharu 41', 45+2', 53', 77' |

Takitumu School, Matavera
Attendance: 150
Referee: Tupou Patia (Cook Islands)
18 January 2016
14:00

| Samoa | 0–5 | New Caledonia |
|---|---|---|
| | Report | Takamatsu 10', 73'; Pahoa 16', 40'; Leme 57' |

CIFA Academy Field, Matavera
Attendance: 100
Referee: Robinson Banga (Vanuatu)

=== Group B ===
| Pos | Team | Pld | W | D | L | GF | GA | GD | Pts | Qualification |
|---|---|---|---|---|---|---|---|---|---|---|
| 1 | Papua New Guinea | 3 | 2 | 1 | 0 | 11 | 4 | +7 | 7 | Knockout stage |
| 2 | Fiji | 3 | 1 | 1 | 1 | 7 | 5 | +2 | 4 | Knockout stage |
| 3 | Cook Islands (H) | 3 | 1 | 0 | 2 | 6 | 6 | 0 | 3 | |
| 4 | Vanuatu | 3 | 1 | 0 | 2 | 5 | 14 | −9 | 3 | |

Source: OFC
(H) Hosts
14 January 2016
17:00

| Cook Islands | 0–3 | Fiji |
|---|---|---|
| | Report | Hussein 22'; Likuculacula 30'; Nasau 59' (pen.) |

CIFA Academy Field, Matavera
Attendance: 500
Referee: Anna-Marie Keighley (New Zealand)
14 January 2016
19:30

| Papua New Guinea | 7–1 | Vanuatu |
|---|---|---|
| Giada 1', 21', 43', 47'; Malara 11', 80'; Unamba 82' | Report | Gere 90+1' (pen.) |

CIFA Academy Field, Matavera
Attendance: 150
Referee: Averii Jacques (Tahiti)

16 January 2016
14:30

| Fiji | 2–3 | Vanuatu |
|---|---|---|
| Nasau 70'; Likuculacula 74' | Report | Gere 44'; Ngwele 48'; Simon 83' |

CIFA Academy Field, Matavera
Attendance: 300
Referee: Nelson Sogo (Solomon Islands)
16 January 2016
17:00

| Papua New Guinea | 2–1 | Cook Islands |
|---|---|---|
| Giada 39', 44' | Report | Williams 10' |

CIFA Academy Field, Matavera
Attendance: 450
Referee: Tapita Lelenga (Tonga)

18 January 2016
17:00

| Vanuatu | 1–5 | Cook Islands |
|---|---|---|
| Coulon 84' | Report | Harmon 3', 17', 35'; Marurai 37'; Rongokea 46' |

CIFA Academy Field, Matavera
Attendance: 500
Referee: Averii Jacques (Tahiti)
18 January 2016
17:00

| Fiji | 2–2 | Papua New Guinea |
|---|---|---|
| ? 49' (o.g.); Nasau 83' | Report | Giada 28'; Malara 65' |

Takitumu School, Matavera
Attendance: 100
Referee: Anna-Marie Keighley (New Zealand)

== Knockout stage ==
=== Bracket ===
Semi-finals
21 January
New Zealand | 11
Fiji | 0
21 January
Papua New Guinea | 2
New Caledonia | 1

Final
23 January
New Zealand | 8
Papua New Guinea | 0
Third place
23 January
Fiji | 3
New Caledonia | 2

=== Semi-finals ===
21 January 2016
14:00

| New Zealand | 11–0 | Fiji |
|---|---|---|
| Blake 7', 45'; Krystman 12' ? 24' (o.g.); Main 38', 45+7'; Hand 45+2', 82', 90+5'; Tawharu 76', 90+4' | Report |

CIFA Academy Field, Matavera
Attendance: 300
Referee: Tupou Patia (Cook Islands)

21 January 2016
17:00

| Papua New Guinea | 2–1 | New Caledonia |
|---|---|---|
| Kig 3', 90+5' | Report | Pahoa 85' (pen.) |

CIFA Academy Field, Matavera
Attendance: 300
Referee: Nelson Sogo (Solomon Islands)

=== Third place match ===
23 January 2016
14:00

| Fiji | 3–2 | New Caledonia |
|---|---|---|
| Nasau 5', 35' ? 74' (o.g.) | Report | Takamatsu 11'; Pahoa 88' |

CIFA Academy Field, Matavera
Attendance: 600
Referee: Anna-Marie Keighley (New Zealand)

=== Final ===
Winner qualified for 2016 FIFA U-17 Women's World Cup.

23 January 2016
17:00

| New Zealand | 8–0 | Papua New Guinea |
|---|---|---|
| Blake 26', 46', 90+1'; Hand 33', 51', 53'; Tawharu 62'; Foster 88' | Report |

CIFA Academy Field, Matavera
Attendance: 600
Referee: Averii Jacques (Tahiti)

== Winners ==
2016 OFC U-17 Women's Championship

**New Zealand**
**Third title**

New Zealand qualified for the FIFA U-17 Women's World Cup for the fifth consecutive time.

| Team | Qualified on | Previous appearances in tournament^{1} |
|---|---|---|
| New Zealand | 23 January 2016 | 4 (2008, 2010, 2012, 2014) |

^{1} Bold indicates champion for that year. Italic indicates host for that year.

== Awards ==
The following awards were given at the conclusion of the tournament.

| Award | Player |
|---|---|
| Golden Ball | (New Zealand) Michaela Foster |
| Golden Boot | (New Zealand) Hannah Blake |
| Golden Gloves | (Fiji) Francine Lockington |
| Fair Play Award | Cook Islands |

== Goalscorers ==
14 goals

- (New Zealand) Hannah Blake

10 goals

- (New Zealand) Jacqui Hand

9 goals

- (New Zealand) Samantha Tawharu

7 goals

- (Papua New Guinea) Belinda Giada
- (New Zealand) Maggie Jenkins

6 goals

- (New Caledonia) Jackie Pahoa

5 goals

- (Fiji) Cema Nasau
- (New Zealand) Emma Main

3 goals

- (Cook Islands) Moeroa Harmon
- (New Caledonia) Katinka Takamatsu
- (New Zealand) Sarah Krystman
- (Papua New Guinea) Anna Malara

2 goals

- (Fiji) Koleta Likuculacula
- (New Zealand) Michaela Foster
- (New Zealand) Gabe Jillings
- (Papua New Guinea) Robertlynn Kig
- (Vanuatu) Annie Gere

1 goal

- (Cook Islands) Nicole Marurai
- (Cook Islands) Daimzel Rongokea
- (Cook Islands) Susan Williams
- (Fiji) Aliza Hussein
- (New Caledonia) Jessica Ali Said
- (New Caledonia) Lucinda Koindredi
- (New Caledonia) Elise Lalie
- (New Caledonia) Joelle Leme
- (New Zealand) Claudia Bunge
- (Papua New Guinea) Selina Unamba
- (Samoa) Sophia Aveau
- (Tonga) Alexandra Fifita
- (Tonga) Mele Kafa
- (Tonga) Seini Lutu
- (Tonga) Ana Polovili
- (Vanuatu) Keren Coulon
- (Vanuatu) Cynthia Ngwele
- (Vanuatu) Leimata Simon

Own goals

- (Fiji) 1 own goal (playing against New Zealand)
- (New Caledonia) 1 own goal (playing against Fiji)
- (Papua New Guinea) 1 own goal (playing against Fiji)
- (Samoa) 1 own goal (playing against New Zealand)
