= Tonga women's national under-17 football team =

National association football team

Tonga Women's U-17
- Association: Tonga Football Association
- Confederation: OFC (Oceania)
- Head coach: (Tonga) Lafaele Moala
- Captain: Seini Lutu
- Most caps: Mele Kafa; Carmel Uhila; Seini Lutu; Ana Polovili (6)
- Top scorer: Seini Lutu; Ana Polovili (3)
- Home stadium: Teufaiva Sport Stadium
- FIFA code: TGA
First colours	Second colours

FIFA ranking
- Current: 123 ▼7
- Highest: 53 (2005)
- Lowest: 123 (June 2017)

First international
- Papua New Guinea 4–0 Tonga (Auckland, New Zealand; 12 April 2010)

Biggest win
- Tonga 6–1 American Samoa (Apia, Samoa; 11 August 2017)

Biggest defeat
- Tonga 0–18 New Zealand (Auckland, New Zealand; 16 April 2010)

World Cup
- Appearances: 0

OFC U-17 Women's Championship
- Appearances: 4 (first in 2010)
- Best result: Third Place (2024)

The Tonga women's national under-17 football team is the second highest youth team of women's football in Tonga and is controlled by the Tonga Football Association.

== History ==
Tonga has participated two times so far in the OFC U-17 Women's Championship. The first time, in 2010, they suffered three heavy defeats. Six years later there was more to be happy about, as they won 4–1 against Samoa. The goals were scored by Alexandra Fifita, Seini Lutu, Mele Kafa and Ana Polovili. This was the first and so far the only game that Tonga scored in as well as won. For Samoa, this was also a historical moment, because they also scored their first goal ever.

Tonga's greatest football triumph to date was their triumph in the first ever Polynesian Cup held in 1993 over Samoa and the Cook Islands. Although local players have not yet made their mark on big leagues abroad, the Chief Executive of the Tonga Football Association, Joe Topou, was appointed to the FIFA Executive Committee in 2002. The Tonga association is the only sports organization on the island that employs full-time administrative staff.

Tonga's second Goal project will develop and improve the national football academy and the association's headquarters in Atele, Tongatapu, which was built in the country's first Goal project. This development work will ensure that all of the Tonga Football Associations needs are fully satisfied. Local matches will be held at the football academy, while the administration's requirements, including the needs of players, officials and spectators, will also be covered. The football school will be transformed into a House of Football.

== OFC ==
The OFC Women's Under 17 Qualifying Tournament is a tournament held once every two years to decide the only qualification spot for Oceania Football Confederation (OFC) and representatives at the FIFA U-17 World Cup.

OFC U-17 Women's Championship
Year	Round	Pld	W	D	L	GF	GA
(New Zealand) 2010	Fourth Place	3	0	0	3	0	27
(New Zealand) 2012	Did not Participate						
(Cook Islands) 2016	Group stage	3	1	0	2	4	19
(Samoa) 2017	Group stage	3	1	1	1	7	4
(French Polynesia) 2023	Fourth Place	5	1	1	3	11	17
(Fiji) 2024	Third place	5	2	1	2	10	13
Total	5/6	19	5	3	11	32	80

== Current technical staff ==
Position	
Head coach	(Tonga) Lafaele Moala
Assistant Coach	(Tonga) Penateti Feke
Goalkeeper Coach	(Tonga) Motekiai Faupula
Team Manager	(Tonga) Stephen Palavi
Assistant Team Manager	(Tonga) Muimuinoa Funaki
