= Matavera =

District of the island of Rarotonga in the Cook Islands

Coordinates: 21.225735°S 159.737341°W

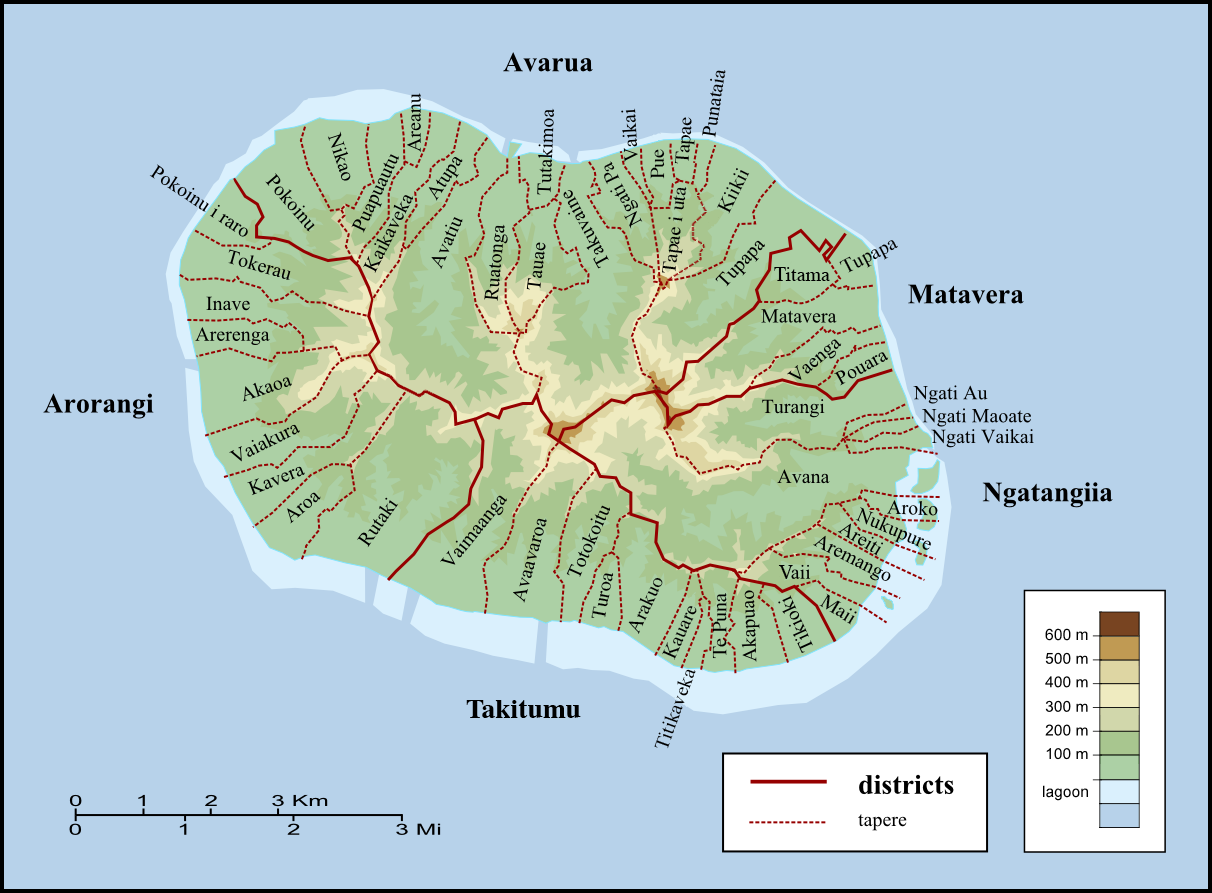
Districts and tapere on Rarotonga.

Matavera (literally meaning "hot eyes"; traditionally known as Rangiatea) is a district on the island of Rarotonga in the Cook Islands, located in the northeast of the island. The smallest of Rarotonga's five districts by area, it is subdivided into five tapere and has a relatively high population density. As of the 2021 census, the district had a population of 1,018 residents. Local infrastructure includes ultraviolet-treated water stations established in 2015 to provide clean drinking water for residents.

== Geography and location ==
Matavera is the smallest of the five districts on the island of Rarotonga in the Cook Islands, yet it is well-populated. It is located in the northeast of the island, to the east of the capital district of Avarua, and north of the district of Ngatangiia. Matavera is subdivided into five tapere (out of 54 for Rarotonga). They are named (listed from west to east): Tupapa, Titama, Matavera, Vaenga, and Pouara.

== Etymology ==
The literal translation of Matavera into English is "hot eyes" ("mata" means eyes or face and "vera" means hot). The previous name of Matavera was Rangiatea.

== Demographics ==
According to census data, gathered by the Cook Islands Statistics Office, the population of Matavera has shown modest growth over the past decade. In the 2011 census, the district recorded a population of 969 residents. This figure increased slightly to 979 in 2016, and by 2021, the population had reached 1,018. This represents an average annual growth rate of approximately 0.49% between 2011 and 2021. Covering an area of 1.85 square kilometres (0.71 sq mi), Matavera had a population density of about 550.3 inhabitants per square kilometre as of the 2021 census.

== Infrastructure ==
In 2015, the Matavera Water Station was officially opened by Kiriau Turepu, the Member of Parliament for the village. The facility was established with support from the Cook Foundation and provides ultraviolet-treated water, ensuring safe drinking water for local residents. According to Turepu, the initiative was inspired by an elderly resident who requested access to clean water for use in traditional medicine. As of recent years, the Matavera district committee has overseen maintenance of the village's three water stations, including a 2023 funding request of $795 to cover the cost of essential materials.
