= Papua New Guinea women's national under-17 soccer team =

National association football team

Papua New Guinea Women's U-17
- Nickname(s): Lakatois (Motuan sailing vessel)
- Association: Papua New Guinea Football Association
- Confederation: OFC (Oceania)
- Head coach: Susan Watpore + Tracy Kig & Edna Thomas
- Top scorer: Belinda Giada (7)
- Home stadium: Hubert Murray Stadium
- FIFA code: PNG

First international
- Papua New Guinea 4–0 Tonga (Auckland, New Zealand; 12 April 2010)

Biggest win
- Papua New Guinea 7–1 Vanuatu (Matavera, Cook Islands; 14 January 2016); American Samoa 2–8 Papua New Guinea (Port Moresby, Papua New Guinea; 21 April 2026)

Biggest defeat
- Papua New Guinea 0–11 Samoa (Auckland, New Zealand; 17 June 2024)

World Cup
- Appearances: 0

OFC U-17 Women's Championship
- Appearances: 3 (first in 2010)
- Best result: Runners-up (2012, 2016)

The Papua New Guinea women's national under-17 soccer team is the second highest women's youth team of women's soccer in Papua New Guinea and is controlled by the Papua New Guinea Football Association.

== History ==
Papua New Guinea have participated all three times so far in the OFC U-17 Women's Championship. They managed to get a second spot twice, in 2012 and in 2016. In the first tournament, in 2010, they became third. Georgina Kaikas scored Papua New Guinea's first ever goal in the tournament. She did this on April 12, 2010 in a 4–0 victory against Tonga women's national under-17 football team. She managed to score four goals in total. However, with this number she is not the top goal scorer of the country cause in 2016 Belinda Giada scored seven goals.

=== OFC ===
The OFC Women's Under 17 Qualifying Tournament is a tournament held once every two years to decide the only qualification spot for Oceania Football Confederation (OFC) and representatives at the FIFA U-17 World Cup.

OFC U-17 Women's Championship
Year	Round	Pld	W	D	L	GF	GA
(New Zealand) 2010	Third Place	3	1	0	2	4	10
(New Zealand) 2012	Runners-up	3	2	0	1	4	11
(Cook Islands) 2016	Runners-up	5	3	1	1	13	13
(Samoa) 2017	Withdrew						
(French Polynesia) 2023	Withdrew						
(Fiji) 2024	Did not qualify						
Total	3/6	11	6	1	4	21	34

== Current technical staff ==
Position	
Head coach	(Papua New Guinea) Susan Watpore
Assistant Coach	(Papua New Guinea) Tracy Kig
Assistant Coach	(Papua New Guinea) Edna Thomas
Team Manager	(Papua New Guinea) Maggie Taligatus
