= New Zealand women's national under-17 football team =

National under-17 association football team representing New Zealand

New Zealand Women's U-17
- Nickname: Young Football Ferns
- Association: New Zealand Football
- Confederation: OFC (Oceania)
- Head coach: Leon Birnie
- Captain: TBD
- FIFA code: NZL
First colours	Second colours

First international
- Australia 4–0 New Zealand (Auckland, New Zealand; 8 December 2007)

Biggest win
- Vanuatu 0–27 New Zealand (Pirae, Tahiti; 20 September 2023)

Biggest defeat
- New Zealand 0–6 Japan (Scarborough, Trinidad and Tobago; 13 September 2010)

OFC U-17 Women's Championship
- Appearances: 8 (first in 2010)
- Best result: Champions (2010, 2012, 2016, 2017, 2023, 2024, 2025, 2026)

FIFA U-17 Women's World Cup
- Appearances: 10 (first in 2008)
- Best result: Third place (2018)

The New Zealand women's Under-17 Football Team, informally known as the 'Young Football Ferns', is the representative team for New Zealand in international Under-17 association football tournaments. The Young Football Ferns were the host team for the 2008 FIFA U-17 Women's World Cup.

The Young Football Ferns compete in the OFC U-17 Women's Championship, the bi-annual confederation championship to decide who represents Oceania Football Confederation at the FIFA U-17 Women's World Cup. The inaugural tournament was held in 2010.

== FIFA U-17 Women's World Cup Finals history ==
Legend

Win Draw Lose

2008

28 October 2008	New Zealand	0–1	Canada	North Harbour Stadium, Auckland
19:00		Report	Lamarre 53'	Attendance: 13,123; Referee: (Finland) Kirsi Savolainen

1 November 2008	New Zealand	1–2	Denmark	North Harbour Stadium, Auckland
16:00	Longo 13'	Report	Andreasen 29'; Olsen 56'	Attendance: 11,170; Referee: (Peru) Silvia Reyes

4 November 2008	Colombia	1–3	New Zealand	Westpac Stadium, Wellington
19:00	Ariza 82'	Report	White 44', 81', 87'	Attendance: 3,546; Referee: (Japan) Etsuko Fukano

2010

6 September 2010	New Zealand	1–2	Venezuela	Ato Boldon Stadium, Couva
19:00	Loye 10'	Report	Viso 24', 67'	Attendance: 1,364; Referee: Thalia Mitsi (Greece)

9 September 2010	New Zealand	1–3	Spain	Ato Boldon Stadium, Couva
16:00	Loye 15'	Report	Gili 4'; Merida 48'; Lazaro 86'	Attendance: 1,785; Referee: Cha Sung Mi (Korea Republic)

13 September 2010	Japan	6–0	New Zealand	Dwight Yorke Stadium, Scarborough
16:00	Yokoyama 24', 58'; Y. Tanaka 59', 89'; M. Tanaka 74'; Honda 90+1'	Report		Attendance: 2,140; Referee: Kirsi Heikkinen (Finland)

2012

23 September 2012	Mexico	1–0	New Zealand	Bayil Stadium, Baku
15:00	Pérez 36'	Report		Attendance: 1,900; Referee: Jana Adámková (Czech Republic)

26 September 2012	New Zealand	0–3	Japan	Eighth Kilometer District Stadium, Baku
20:00		Report	Hasegawa 60', 78'; Sumida 90+3' (pen.)	Attendance: 7,000; Referee: Cardella Samuels (Jamaica)

30 September 2012	New Zealand	3–4	Brazil	Eighth Kilometer District Stadium, Baku
14:00	Jensen 4'; Clara 45+1' (o.g.); Puketapu 77'	Report	Byanca 10'; Brena 26'; Andressa 35' (pen.); Camila 55'	Attendance: 8,857; Referee: Ri Hyang-Ok (North Korea)

2014

16 March 2014	New Zealand	1–1	Paraguay	Estadio Ricardo Saprissa Aymá, Tibas
11:00	Cleverley 69'	Report	Barrios 84'	Attendance: 2,250; Referee: Pannipar Kamnueng (Thailand)

19 March 2014	New Zealand	0–3	Spain	Estadio Ricardo Saprissa Aymá, Tibas
17:00		Report	Hernández 3'; Garrote 34'; García 67'	Attendance: 2,364; Referee: Aissata Amegee (Togo)

23 March 2014	Japan	3–0	New Zealand	Estadio Nacional de Costa Rica, San José
17:00	Hasegawa 20'; Kobayashi 71' (pen.); Matsubara 90+3'	Report		Attendance: 5,100; Referee: Ana Marques (Brazil)

2016

30 September 2016	Mexico	5–0	New Zealand	Amman International Stadium, Amman
17:00	Espinosa 18'; Ovalle 36'; Lopez 68'; Avalos 81'; Torres 87'	Report		Attendance: 7,635; Referee: Yeimy Martinez (Colombia)

3 October 2016	Spain	2–0	New Zealand	Al-Hassan Stadium, Irbid
16:00	Laia 80'; Pina 85'	Report		Attendance: 698; Referee: Park Ji-Yeong (South Korea)

7 October 2016	New Zealand	5–0	Jordan	Prince Mohammed Stadium, Zarqa
16:00	Tawharu 5', 90'; Blake 28', 76', 90+2'	Report		Attendance: 4,493; Referee: Aissata Amegee (Togo)

2018

13 November 2018	New Zealand	1–0	Finland	Estadio Charrúa, Montevideo
16:00	Brown 41'	Report		Attendance: 1,385; Referee: Yoshimi Yamashita (Japan)

16 November 2018	Uruguay	1–2	New Zealand	Estadio Charrúa, Montevideo
19:00	Aquino 8'	Report	Wisnewski 26'; Brown 36'	Attendance: 4,619; Referee: Salima Mukansanga (Rwanda)

20 November 2018	Ghana	2–0	New Zealand	Estadio Charrúa, Montevideo
17:00	Abdulai 61', 89'	Report		Attendance: 359; Referee: Sara Persson (Sweden)

24 November 2018	Japan	1–1 (3–4 p)	New Zealand	Estadio Profesor Alberto Suppici, Colonia del Sacramento
17:00	Mackay-Wright 31' (o.g.)	Report	Abbott 17'	Attendance: 477; Referee: Ekaterina Koroleva (United States)
	Penalties
	Matsuda (penalty missed); Kinoshita (penalty scored); Tomioka (penalty missed); Kamiya (penalty scored); Yoshizumi (penalty scored)		(penalty scored) Hahn; (penalty scored) Wisnewski; (penalty scored) Brown; (penalty missed) Stewart; (penalty scored) Leat

28 November 2018	New Zealand	0–2	Spain	Estadio Charrúa, Montevideo
16:00		Report	Pina 39'; I. López 48'	Attendance: 369; Referee: Yoshimi Yamashita (Japan)

1 December 2018	New Zealand	2–1	Canada	Estadio Charrúa, Montevideo
16:00	Wisnewski 1', 13'	Report	Kazandjian 64'	Referee: Riem Hussein (Germany)

2022

11 October 2022 2022 FIFA U-17 Women's World Cup GS	Chile	3–1	New Zealand	Margao, India
16:30	A. Figueroa 12'; Rovner 22' (pen.); Cifuentes 64'	Report (FIFA)	Clegg 52'	Stadium: Pandit Jawaharlal Nehru Stadium; Attendance: 4,064; Referee: Rebecca Welch (England)

14 October 2022 2022 FIFA U-17 Women's World Cup GS	New Zealand	0–4	Nigeria	Margao, India
16:30 UTC+5:30		Report (FIFA)	Bello 16'; Usani 34'; Afolabi 75'; Etim 90+5'	Stadium: Pandit Jawaharlal Nehru Stadium; Attendance: 2,191; Referee: Pansa Chaisanit (Thailand)

17 October 2022 2022 FIFA U-17 Women's World Cup GS	New Zealand	1–3	Germany	Margao, India
16:30 UTC+5:30	Clegg 10'	Report (FIFA)	Bender 5', 54'; Şehitler 60' (pen.)	Stadium: Pandit Jawaharlal Nehru Stadium; Attendance: 1,945; Referee: Bouchra Karboubi (Morocco)

2024

16 October 2024 2024 FIFA U-17 Women's World Cup GS	New Zealand	1–4	Nigeria	Santiago de los Caballeros, Dominican Republic
16:00	Saxon 60'	Report	Moshood 2'; Adegoke 13'; Abdulwahab 28'; Afolabi 55'	Stadium: Estadio Cibao FC; Attendance: 1,040; Referee: Olatz Rivera (Spain)

19 October 2024 2024 FIFA U-17 Women's World Cup GS	Dominican Republic	1–1	New Zealand	Santiago de los Caballeros, Dominican Republic
19:00	Brito 68'	Report	Mercedes 61' (o.g.)	Stadium: Estadio Cibao FC; Attendance: 3,258; Referee: Asaka Koizumi (Japan)

22 October 2024 2024 FIFA U-17 Women's World Cup GS	Ecuador	4–0	New Zealand	Santiago de los Caballeros, Dominican Republic
19:00	Arboleda 41'; Chiuchiolo 43', 49'; Morán 79'	Report		Stadium: Estadio Cibao FC; Attendance: 1,248; Referee: Lê Thị Ly (Vietnam)

2025

19 October 2025 2025 FIFA U-17 Women's World Cup GS	Japan	3–0	New Zealand	Salé, Morocco
14:00	Aoki 38' (pen.); Fukushima 75'; Shikida 84'	Report		Stadium: Mohammed VI Football Academy (pitch 3); Attendance: 204; Referee: Josephine Wanjiru (Kenya)

22 October 2025 2025 FIFA U-17 Women's World Cup GS	Paraguay	4–1	New Zealand	Salé, Morocco
20:00	Martínez 49', 54', 65'; Florentín 67'	Report	Pugh 30'	Stadium: Mohammed VI Football Academy (pitch 3); Attendance: 1,345; Referee: Yacine Samassa (Mauritania)

22 October 2025 2025 FIFA U-17 Women's World Cup GS	New Zealand	0–4	Zambia	Salé, Morocco
20:00		Report	Mbali 33'; Chipasula 44'; Sekeseke 69'; Muller 80' (o.g.)	Stadium: Mohammed VI Football Academy (pitch 2); Attendance: 1,479; Referee: Paula Fernández (Colombia)

2026

17 October 2026 2026 FIFA U-17 Women's World Cup GS	Morocco	4–0	New Zealand	Salé, Morocco
18:00	Abajiou 57'; Chaytor 70' (o.g.); Dhissi 76'; Youssoufi 82' (pen.)	Report		Stadium: Mohammed VI Football Academy (pitch 3); Referee: Carly Shaw-MacLaren (Canada)

20 October 2026 2026 FIFA U-17 Women's World Cup GS	Argentina	2–0	New Zealand	Salé, Morocco
15:00	Diz 42', 69'	Report		Stadium: Mohammed VI Football Academy (pitch 3); Attendance: 231; Referee: Natalie Simon (United States)

23 October 2026 2026 FIFA U-17 Women's World Cup GS	New Zealand	0–2	Germany	Salé, Morocco
18:00	Diz 42', 69'	Report	Ernst 45+2'; Choisy 56'	Stadium: Mohammed VI Football Academy (Pitch 3); Attendance: 461; Referee: Josephine Wanjiru (Kenya)

== Players ==
=== Current squad ===
Squad for the 2022 FIFA U-17 Women's World Cup.

No.	Pos.	Player	Date of birth (age)	Club
1	GK	Aimee Feinberg-Danieli	11 February 2005 (aged 19)	(New Zealand Football) Auckland United FC
18	GK	Madeleine Iro	24 October 2005 (aged 18)	(New Zealand Football) Cashmere Technical
21	GK	Sophie Campbell	23 February 2007 (aged 17)	(New Zealand Football) New Plymouth Rangers
2	DF	Suya Hearing	3 July 2005 (aged 19)	(New Zealand Football) Northern Rovers
3	DF	Ella McMillan	20 March 2005 (aged 19)	(New Zealand Football) Wellington Phoenix FC
4	DF	Marie Green	12 January 2005 (aged 19)	(New Zealand Football) Ellerslie AFC
5	DF	Manaia Elliott	21 April 2005 (aged 19)	(New Zealand Football) Melville United AFC
16	DF	Rebekah Trewhitt	13 December 2005 (aged 18)	(New Zealand Football) Palmerston North Marist FC
17	DF	Lara Smith	18 March 2006 (aged 18)	(New Zealand Football) Wellington United
6	MF	Charlotte Mortlock	9 March 2006 (aged 18)	(New Zealand Football) Cashmere Technical
8	MF	Helena Errington	31 July 2005 (aged 19)	(New Zealand Football) Western Suburbs FC
10	MF	Olivia Ingham	9 November 2005 (aged 18)	(New Zealand Football) Wellington Phoenix FC
11	MF	Kiara Bercelli	23 February 2005 (aged 19)	(Football Australia) Alamein FC
13	MF	Lara Colpi	5 May 2005 (aged 19)	(New Zealand Football) Western Springs AFC
14	MF	Olivia Page	5 May 2005 (aged 19)	(New Zealand Football) Eastern Suburbs AFC
15	MF	Ella McCann	25 March 2005 (aged 19)	(New Zealand Football) FC Nelson
19	MF	Zoe Benson	14 August 2006 (aged 18)	(New Zealand Football) Eastern Suburbs AFC
20	MF	Megan Simpson	1 September 2006 (aged 18)	(New Zealand Football) Nomads United
7	FW	Ruby Nathan	11 October 2005 (aged 19)	(New Zealand Football) Auckland United FC
9	FW	Milly Clegg	1 November 2005 (aged 18)	(New Zealand Football) Wellington Phoenix
12	FW	Alexis Cook	1 July 2005 (aged 19)	(New Zealand Football) Northern Rovers

== Competitive record ==
=== FIFA U-17 Women's World Cup ===
Year	Result	Pld	W	D*	L	GF	GA	Squad
(New Zealand) 2008	Group stage	3	1	0	2	4	4	Squad
(Trinidad and Tobago) 2010	Group stage	3	0	0	3	2	11	Squad
(Azerbaijan) 2012	Group stage	3	0	0	3	3	8	Squad
(Costa Rica) 2014	Group stage	3	0	1	2	1	7	Squad
(Jordan) 2016	Group stage	3	1	0	2	5	7	Squad
(Uruguay) 2018	Third place	6	3	1	2	6	7	Squad
(India) 2022	Group stage	3	0	0	3	2	10	Squad
(Dominican Republic) 2024	Group stage	3	0	1	2	2	9	Squad
(Morocco) 2025	Group stage	3	0	0	3	1	11	Squad
(Morocco) 2026	Group stage	3	0	0	3	0	8	Squad
(Morocco) 2027	To be determined							
(Morocco) 2028	To be determined							
(Morocco) 2029	To be determined							
Total	10/13	33	5	3	25	26	82	–

* Draws include knockout matches decided by penalty shoot-out.

=== OFC U-16 Women's Championship ===
Year	Round	Pld	W	D	L	GF	GA
(New Zealand) 2010	Champions	3	3	0	0	37	0
(New Zealand) 2012	Champions	3	3	0	0	29	1
(Cook Islands) 2016	Champions	5	5	0	0	55	0
(Samoa) 2017	Champions	5	5	0	0	47	1
(French Polynesia) 2023	Champions	5	5	0	0	51	1
(Fiji) 2024	Champions	5	5	0	0	26	0
(Samoa) 2025	Champions	5	5	0	0	22	2
(Solomon Islands) 2026	Champions	5	5	0	0	21	0
Total	8 titles	36	36	0	0	288	5

== Head-to-head record ==
The following table shows New Zealand's head-to-head record in the FIFA U-17 Women's World Cup.

Opponent	Pld	W	D	L	GF	GA	GD	Win %
Argentina	1	0	0	1	0	2	−2	0.00
Brazil	1	0	0	1	3	4	−1	0.00
Canada	2	1	0	1	2	2	+0	50.00
Chile	1	0	0	1	1	3	−2	0.00
Colombia	1	1	0	0	3	1	+2	100.00
Denmark	1	0	0	1	1	2	−1	0.00
Dominican Republic	1	0	1	0	1	1	+0	0.00
Ecuador	1	0	0	1	0	4	−4	0.00
Finland	1	1	0	0	1	0	+1	100.00
Germany	2	0	0	2	1	5	−4	0.00
Ghana	1	0	0	1	0	2	−2	0.00
Japan	5	0	1	4	1	16	−15	0.00
Jordan	1	1	0	0	5	0	+5	100.00
Mexico	2	0	0	2	0	6	−6	0.00
Morocco	1	0	0	1	0	4	−4	0.00
Nigeria	2	0	0	2	1	8	−7	0.00
Paraguay	2	0	1	1	2	5	−3	0.00
Spain	4	0	0	4	1	10	−9	0.00
Uruguay	1	1	0	0	2	1	+1	100.00
Venezuela	1	0	0	1	1	2	−1	0.00
Zambia	1	0	0	1	0	4	−4	0.00
Total	33	5	3	25	26	82	−56	15.15
