= 2010 OFC Women's Under 17 Qualifying Tournament =

Tournament details
- Host country: New Zealand
- Dates: 12 April – 16 April
- Teams: 4 (from 1 confederation)
- Venue: 1 (in 1 host city)

Final positions
- Champions: New Zealand (1st title)
- Runners-up: Solomon Islands
- Third place: Papua New Guinea
- Fourth place: Tonga

Tournament statistics
- Matches played: 6
- Goals scored: 47 (7.83 per match)
- Top scorer(s): (New Zealand) Hannah Wong (8 goals)

The 2010 OFC Under 17 tournament was the 1st edition of the OFC Women's Under 17 Qualifying Tournament which took place between 12 April – 16 April 2010 in New Zealand. The winner was New Zealand who were the Oceania Football Confederation representative at the 2010 FIFA U-17 Women's World Cup in Trinidad and Tobago.

== Participating teams ==
- New Zealand (host)
- Papua New Guinea
- Solomon Islands
- Tonga

== Matches ==
Nation	Pld	W	D	L	GF	GA	GD	Pts
New Zealand	3	3	0	0	37	0	+37	9
Solomon Islands	3	2	0	1	6	10	−4	6
Papua New Guinea	3	1	0	2	4	10	−6	3
Tonga	3	0	0	3	0	27	−27	0

12 April 2010
12:00 NZST

Papua New Guinea	4–0	Tonga
Georgina Kaikas 27', 36'; Grace Steven 44'; Bianka Robert 64'

North Harbour Stadium, Auckland
12 April 2010
15:00 NZST

New Zealand	10–0	Solomon Islands
Kayte Loye 13'; Katie Bowen 30'; Hannah Wong 45', 50'; Olivia Chance 46', 56'; Sivitha Boyce 70'; Holly Patterson 77'; Brittany Dudley-Smith 78', 87'

North Harbour Stadium, Auckland

14 April 2010
12:00 NZST

Tonga	0–5	Solomon Islands
		Merina Philip Joe 11'; Corina Hasi 13'; Elizabeth Malau 30'; Mirriam Oneasi 47'; Ella Vakatao 69'

North Harbour Stadium, Auckland
14 April 2010
15:00 NZST

New Zealand	9–0	Papua New Guinea
Holly Patterson 3', 9', 57'; Kate Loye 8'; Stephanie Skilton 12'; Evie Millynn 40'; Wena Laka 44' (o.g.); Brittany Dudley-Smith 69', 87'

North Harbour Stadium, Auckland

16 April 2010
12:00 NZST

Solomon Islands	1–0	Papua New Guinea
Joy Timo 90+2'

North Harbour Stadium, Auckland
16 April 2010
15:00 NZST

Tonga	0–18	New Zealand
		Brittany Dudley-Smith 7', 9', 41'; Ashleigh Ward 11', 19', 51'; Hannah Wong 13', 36', 49', 58', 65', 90+1'; Kate Loye 23', 67'; Kate Carlton 28'; Grace Parkinson 70' (pen.); Hannah Carlsen 72' (pen.); Stephanie Skilton 90+4'

North Harbour Stadium, Auckland

== Goal scorers ==
8 goals

- (New Zealand) Hannah Wong

7 goals

- (New Zealand) Brittany Dudley-Smith

4 goals

- (New Zealand) Kate Loye
- (New Zealand) Holly Patterson

3 goals

- (New Zealand) Ashleigh Ward

2 goals

- (New Zealand) Olivia Chance
- (New Zealand) Stephanie Skilton
- (Papua New Guinea) Georgina Kaikas

1 goal

- (New Zealand) Katie Bowen
- (New Zealand) Sivitha Boyce
- (New Zealand) Hannah Carlsen
- (New Zealand) Kate Carlton
- (New Zealand) Evie Millynn
- (New Zealand) Grace Parkinson
- (Papua New Guinea) Grace Steven
- (Papua New Guinea) Bianka Robert
- (Solomon Islands) Corina Hasi
- (Solomon Islands) Elizabeth Malau
- (Solomon Islands) Mirriam Oneasi
- (Solomon Islands) Merina Philip Joe
- (Solomon Islands) Joy Timo
- (Solomon Islands) Ella Vakatao
