= 2012 OFC Women's Under 17 Qualifying Tournament =

Tournament details
- Host country: New Zealand
- Dates: 9 – 13 April
- Teams: 4 (from 1 confederation)
- Venue: 1 (in 1 host city)

Final positions
- Champions: New Zealand (2nd title)
- Runners-up: Papua New Guinea
- Third place: Cook Islands
- Fourth place: New Caledonia

Tournament statistics
- Matches played: 6
- Goals scored: 39 (6.5 per match)
- Top scorer(s): (New Zealand) Hannah Carlsen (New Zealand) Jasmine Pereira (6 goals each)

The 2012 OFC Under 17 tournament was the second edition of the OFC Women's Under 17 Qualifying Tournament, which acted as the 2012 FIFA U-17 Women's World Cup qualifier in the Oceania Football Confederation region. It took place from 9 to 14 April in Auckland, New Zealand. New Zealand were the defending champions after winning the 2010 edition.

New Zealand won the tournament undefeated with a goal difference of 29–1 and qualified to the World Cup.

The tournament was held alongside the 2012 OFC Women's Under 20 Qualifying Tournament, using the same venue and alternating matchdays.

== Participating teams ==
- Cook Islands
- New Caledonia
- New Zealand (hosts)
- Papua New Guinea

== Matches ==
The four teams played a single round robin.

Team	Pld	W	D	L	GF	GA	GD	Pts
New Zealand	3	3	0	0	29	1	+28	9
Papua New Guinea	3	2	0	1	4	11	−7	6
Cook Islands	3	1	0	2	5	10	−5	3
New Caledonia	3	0	0	3	1	17	−16	0

9 April 2012
13:00

New Caledonia	0–1	Papua New Guinea
	Report	Kaikas 18'

Centre Park, Mangere
9 April 2012
15:00

New Zealand	7–0	Cook Islands
Puketapu 18'; Bott 22'; Rolston 29'; Carlsen 33', 75'; Palmer 67', 71'	Report

Centre Park, Mangere

11 April 2012
13:00

New Caledonia	1–13	New Zealand
Valefakaaga 19'	Report	Pereira 2', 31', 47', 86'; Rolston 28', 60'; Puketapu 36', 84', 90+3'; Cleverley 69'; Carlsen 77'; Innes 82'; Palmer 90+4'

Centre Park, Mangere
11 April 2012
15:00

Cook Islands	2–3	Papua New Guinea
Toka 33', 69'	Report	Lorenz 21', 27'; Kaikas 53'

Centre Park, Mangere

13 April 2012
13:00

Cook Islands	3–0	New Caledonia
Taio 8'; Maoate-Cox 71'; Toka 77'	Report

Centre Park, Mangere
13 April 2012
15:00

Papua New Guinea	0–9	New Zealand
	Report	Lee 1'; Cleverley 22', 39'; Carlsen 36', 40', 78'; Pereira 46', 90+3'; Rolston 78'

Centre Park, Mangere

== Top goalscorers ==
players with at least two goals:

6 goals

- (New Zealand) Hannah Carlsen
- (New Zealand) Jasmine Pereira

4 goals

- (New Zealand) Martine Puketapu
- (New Zealand) Emma Rolston

3 goals

- (Cook Islands) Tepaeru Toka
- (New Zealand) Daisy Cleverley
- (New Zealand) Briar Palmer

2 goals

- (Papua New Guinea) Georgina Kaikas
- (Papua New Guinea) Ramona Lorenz

== Awards ==
New Zealand's Carlsen and Pereira were handed the golden boot for scoring six goals each. New Zealand also won the Fair Play awards as well as the Best Player award with Briar Palmer. Moeroa Nootai from Cook Islands received the Golden Gloves award for best goal-keeping.
