= 2025 in New Zealand association football =

Football in New Zealand
- Season: 2025

Men's football
- National League: Auckland City
- Northern League: Western Springs
- Central League: Wellington Olympic
- Southern League: Coastal Spirit
- Chatham Cup: Wellington Olympic

Women's football
- Women's National League: Auckland United
- NRFL Women's Premiership: West Coast Rangers
- Kate Sheppard Cup: Auckland United

The 2025 season was the 135th competitive association football season in New Zealand.

== National teams ==
=== New Zealand men's national football team ===
==== Friendlies ====
5 September Soccer Ashes	Australia	1–0	New Zealand	Canberra, Australia
19:45 UTC+10	Balard 87'	Source		Stadium: GIO Stadium; Attendance: 19,115; Referee: Donald Robertson (Scotland)

9 September Soccer Ashes	New Zealand	1–3	Australia	Auckland, New Zealand
19:00 UTC+12	Wood 57'	Source	Toure 35', 60'; Irankunda 54'	Stadium: Mount Smart Stadium; Attendance: 18,213; Referee: Donald Robertson (Scotland)

9 October Friendly	Poland	1–0	New Zealand	Chorzów, Poland
20:45 CEST (UTC+2)	Zieliński 49'	Report		Stadium: Stadion Śląski; Attendance: 30,412; Referee: Erik Lambrechts (Belgium)

14 October Friendly	Norway	1–1	New Zealand	Oslo, Norway
18:00 UTC+2	Nusa 63'	Report	Surman 45+1'	Stadium: Ullevaal Stadion; Attendance: 17,652; Referee: Horațiu Feșnic (Romania)

15 November Friendly	Colombia	2–1	New Zealand	Fort Lauderdale, United States
19:00 UTC−5	Puerta 3'; Carbonero 88'	Source	Old 80'	Stadium: Chase Stadium; Attendance: 20,000; Referee: Victor Rivas (United States)

18 November Friendly	Ecuador	2–0	New Zealand	Harrison, United States
20:30 UTC−5	Angulo 50'; Campana 83'	Report		Stadium: Sports Illustrated Stadium; Referee: Ismail Elfath (United States)

==== 2025 Canadian Shield ====
Pos	Team	Pld	W	PKW	PKL	L	GF	GA	GD	Pts	Final result
1st place, gold medalist(s)	Canada (C, H)	2	1	0	1	0	4	2	+2	4	Champions
2	New Zealand	2	1	0	0	1	2	2	0	3	
3	Ukraine	2	1	0	0	1	4	5	−1	3	
4	Ivory Coast	2	0	1	0	1	0	1	−1	2	

Source: Instagram
(C) Champion; (H) Host

7 June Canadian Shield	Ivory Coast	0–1	New Zealand	Toronto
19:00 UTC-4		Report	Just 41'	Stadium: BMO Field; Attendance: 26,345; Referee: Pierre-Luc Lauziere (Canada)

10 June Canadian Shield	New Zealand	1–2	Ukraine	Toronto
17:00 UTC-4	Stamenić 59'	Report	Hutsulyak 54'; Zinchenko 75'	Stadium: BMO Field; Referee: Carly Shaw-MacLaren (Canada)

==== 2026 FIFA World Cup qualification ====
===== Third round =====
21 March 2025	New Zealand	7–0	Fiji	Wellington, New Zealand
19:00	Wood 6', 56', 60'; Singh 17'; Wara 23' (o.g.); Payne 33'; Barbarouses 73'	Report (FIFA); Report (OFC)		Stadium: Sky Stadium; Attendance: 20,947; Referee: Norbert Hauata (Tahiti)

24 March 2025	New Caledonia	0–3	New Zealand	Auckland, New Zealand
19:00		Report (FIFA); Report (OFC)	Boxall 62'; Barbarouses 66'; Just 80'	Stadium: Eden Park; Attendance: 25,132; Referee: Ben Aukwai (Solomon Islands)

=== New Zealand women's national football team ===
==== Friendlies ====
23 February Friendly	Costa Rica	1–1	New Zealand	Santa Ana, Costa Rica
18:00	Chinchilla 20'	Report	Riley 45+2'	Stadium: Estadio Piedades de Santa Ana; Attendance: 1,550

26 February Friendly	Costa Rica	0–1	New Zealand	Alajuela, Costa Rica
16:00		Report	Hahn 89'	Stadium: Estadio Alejandro Morera Soto

5 April Friendly	Chinese Taipei	Cancelled	New Zealand	Taiwan
		Report		Attendance: 0 (Behind closed doors)
Note: The match was called off due to issues with the pitch.

8 April Friendly	Chinese Taipei	Cancelled	New Zealand	Kaohsiung, Taiwan
18:30 UTC+9		Source		Stadium: Kaohsiung Nanzih Football Stadium
Note: The match was called off due to issues with the pitch.

31 May Friendly	New Zealand	1–3	Venezuela	San Pedro Alcántara, Spain
18:00 UTC+2	Kitching 38'	Report	Castellanos 25'; Romero 40'; Chirinos 86'	Stadium: Marbella Football Center; Referee: Seth Galia (Gibraltar)

3 June Friendly	New Zealand	2–1	Venezuela	Algeciras, Spain
18:00 UTC+2	Clegg 45'; Hand 73'	Report	Speckmaier 41'	Stadium: Estadio Nuevo Mirador

23 October Friendly	Mexico	1–0	New Zealand	Mexico City, Mexico
20:00 UTC−6	Farmer 10'	Report		Stadium: Estadio Ciudad de los Deportes; Attendance: 10,250; Referee: Astrid Gramajo (Guatemala)

26 October Friendly	Mexico	2–0	New Zealand	Ciudad Juárez, Mexico
20:00 UTC−6	Ordóñez 11'; Sánchez 16'	Report		Stadium: Estadio Olímpico Benito Juárez; Attendance: 2,000; Referee: Belkis Flores (Honduras)

29 October Friendly	United States	6–0	New Zealand	Kansas City, United States
19:00 UTC−5	Sears 8', 55', 84'; Cooper 34'; Lavelle 44'; Macario 66'	Report		Stadium: CPKC Stadium; Attendance: 11,044; Referee: Saphire Stockman (Costa Rica)

28 November Friendly	Australia	5–0	New Zealand	Gosford, Australia
19:30 UTC+11	Sayer 13'; Raso 24'; Carpenter 70'; Cooney-Cross 71'; Gorry 90+2'	Report		Stadium: polytec Stadium; Attendance: 20,519; Referee: Kim Yu-jeong (South Korea)

2 December Friendly	Australia	2–0	New Zealand	Adelaide, Australia
20:00 UTC+10:30	Kennedy 19'; Raso 70'	Report		Stadium: Coopers Stadium; Attendance: 15,097; Referee: Hong Yu (China)

=== New Zealand national under-20 football team ===
==== Friendlies ====
4 June Friendly	Chile	3–1	New Zealand	Santiago
15:30 UTC−4	Carcamo; Vásquez; (o.g.)	Report	Brooke-Smith	Stadium: Complejo Deportivo Quilín; Attendance: 0 (Behind closed doors)

7 June Friendly	Chile	2–1	New Zealand	Santiago
15:30 UTC−4	Silva 9'; Rossel 47'	Report	Bulkeley 52'	Stadium: Estadio Bicentenario de La Florida; Attendance: 2,075

September Friendly	New Zealand	0–1	South Korea	Santiago
		Report	48' (pen.)

==== 2025 FIFA U-20 World Cup ====
===== Group A =====
Pos	Team	Pld	W	D	L	GF	GA	GD	Pts	Qualification
1	Japan	3	3	0	0	7	0	+7	9	Knockout stage
2	Chile (H)	3	1	0	2	3	5	−2	3 (Note: Teams were tied on head-to-head record (3 points, 0 goal difference, and 3 goals scored), overall record was used. Fair play points: Chile −5, Egypt −7.)	Knockout stage
3	Egypt	3	1	0	2	3	5	−2	3	
4	New Zealand	3	1	0	2	3	6	−3	3	

Source: FIFA
Rules for classification: Group stage tiebreakers
(H) Hosts
Notes:

27 September 2025	Chile	2–1	New Zealand	Santiago, Chile
20:00	Millán 54'; Garguez 90+7'	Report	Walker 85' (pen.)	Stadium: Estadio Nacional Julio Martínez Prádanos; Attendance: 45,547; Referee: Irfan Peljto (Bosnia and Herzegovina)

30 September 2025	Egypt	1–2	New Zealand	Santiago, Chile
17:00	Ahmed Kabaka 5'	Report	Brooke-Smith 13'; Loke 16'	Stadium: Estadio Nacional Julio Martínez Prádanos; Attendance: 5,991; Referee: Khalid Al-Thurais (Saudi Arabia)

3 October 2025	New Zealand	0–3	Japan	Valparaíso, Chile
20:00		Report	Ogura 22'; Smith 64' (o.g.); Ishii 82'	Stadium: Estadio Elías Figueroa Brander; Attendance: 2,938; Referee: Kevin Ortega (Peru)

=== New Zealand women's national under-20 football team ===
==== 2025 OFC U-19 Women's Championship ====
===== Group B =====
Pos	Team	Pld	W	D	L	GF	GA	GD	Pts	Qualification
1	New Zealand	3	3	0	0	22	0	+22	9	Knockout stage
2	New Caledonia	3	1	1	1	2	5	−3	4	Knockout stage
3	Tahiti (H)	3	1	1	1	3	8	−5	4	Fifth place match
4	Vanuatu	3	0	0	3	0	14	−14	0	

Source: OFC
(H) Hosts

22 September 2025	New Zealand	7–0	Tahiti	Papeete, Tahiti
15:00	L. Brazendale 12', 49'; Mortlock 14'; Lyon 37'; Benson 44'; Brown 64'; De Wit 89'	Report		Stadium: Stade Paea; Attendance: 100; Referee: Azusa Sugino (Japan); Man of the Match: (New Zealand) Zoe Benson

25 September 2025	New Zealand	4–0	New Caledonia	Papeete, Tahiti
11:00	L. Brazendale 16'; De Wit 70'; Benson 86', 90+3'	Report		Stadium: Stade Paea; Attendance: 100; Referee: Shu Ting Yang (China); Man of the Match: (New Zealand) Amber De Wit

28 September 2025	Vanuatu	0–11	New Zealand	Papeete, Tahiti
11:00		Report	De Wit 13'; O'Brien 18'; Brill 23'; Lyon 31', 41', 67', 68', 78'; Benson 57'; Brown 60'; L. Brazendale 88'	Stadium: Stade Paea; Attendance: 80; Referee: Shama Maemae (Solomon Islands); Man of the Match: (New Zealand) Emily Lyon

===== Knockout stage =====
1 October 2025 Semi-final	New Zealand	8–0	Cook Islands	Papeete, Tahiti
15:00	Benson 33'; Lyon 36', 41', 55'; Cleall-Harding 67'; L. Brazendale 76', 89'; O'Brien 86'	Report		Stadium: Stade Paea; Attendance: 150; Referee: Azusa Sugino (Japan); Man of the Match: (New Zealand) Daisy Brazendale

4 October 2025 Final	New Caledonia	0–3	New Zealand	Papeete, Tahiti
15:00		Report	Benson 17'; Lyon 36', 45'	Stadium: Stade Paea; Referee: Torika Delai (Fiji); Man of the Match: (New Zealand) Mackenzie Greene

=== New Zealand national under-17 football team ===
==== Friendlies ====
October 2025 Friendly	United States	2–0	New Zealand	Qatar
		Report

==== 2025 FIFA Youth Series ====
Pos	Team	Pld	W	D	L	GF	GA	GD	Pts	Qualification
1	New Zealand	2	2	0	0	5	3	+2	6	Advance to Final
2	Switzerland (H)	2	0	1	1	3	4	−1	1	Advance to Third place play-off
3	Guatemala	2	0	1	1	2	3	−1	1	Advance to Fifth place play-off

Source: FIFA
(H) Hosts

18 May 2025	Switzerland	2–3	New Zealand	Zurich
16:30	Ocran 15'; Krasniqi 73' (pen.)	Report	Nunez 3'; Dyer 49'; Hamilton 54'	Stadium: FIFA headquarters Referee: Kaio Santos de Lima (Brazil)

19 May 2025	Guatemala	1–2	New Zealand	Zurich
16:30	Alvarado 14'	Report	Perez 68'; Trenberth 77'	Stadium: FIFA headquarters Referee: Daniel Uhrmann (Switzerland)

===== Final =====
22 May 2025	New Zealand	0–3	Paraguay	Zurich
16:30		Report	Lopez 19'; Diaz 79'; Gomez 90+5'	Stadium: FIFA headquarters

==== 2025 OFC U-16 Championship ====
===== Group B =====
Pos	Team	Pld	W	D	L	GF	GA	GD	Pts	Qualification
1	New Zealand	3	2	1	0	13	0	+13	7	Knockout stage
2	New Caledonia	3	2	1	0	10	2	+8	7	Knockout stage
3	Solomon Islands (H)	3	1	0	2	6	13	−7	3	5th place match
4	Samoa	3	0	0	3	0	14	−14	0	7th place match

Source: OFC
(H) Hosts

18 August 2025	New Zealand	5–0	Samoa	Honiara, Solomon Islands
12:00	Perez 8', 45', 48'; des Tombe 29'; Trenberth 68'	Report		Stadium: National Stadium; Attendance: 536; Referee: Arnold Tari (Vanuatu)

21 August 2025	New Zealand	0–0	New Caledonia	Honiara, Solomon Islands
12:00		Report		Stadium: National Stadium; Attendance: 380; Referee: Kavitesh Behari (Fiji)

24 August 2025	Solomon Islands	0–8	New Zealand	Honiara, Solomon Islands
15:00		Report	Woldegiorgis 25', 43', 73'; Dyer 37'; Nuñez 41' (pen.); Pietersen 44'; Perez 52'; des Tombe 83'	Stadium: National Stadium; Attendance: 2,368; Referee: Kavitesh Behari (Fiji)

===== Knockout stage =====
27 August 2025 Semi-final	New Zealand	2–0	Papua New Guinea	Honiara, Solomon Islands
17:00	Nuñez 62'; Perez 71' (pen.)	Report		Stadium: National Stadium; Attendance: 438; Referee: Veer Singh (Fiji)

30 August 2025 Final	New Caledonia	0–2	New Zealand	Honiara, Solomon Islands
17:00		Report	Clegg 44'; Perez 90+5'	Stadium: National Stadium; Attendance: 1,050; Referee: Kavitesh Behari (Fiji)

==== 2025 FIFA U-17 World Cup ====
===== Group L =====
Pos	Team	Pld	W	D	L	GF	GA	GD	Pts	Qualification
1	Austria	3	3	0	0	8	1	+7	9	Knockout stage
2	Mali	3	2	0	1	5	3	+2	6	Knockout stage
3	Saudi Arabia	3	1	0	2	3	5	−2	3	
4	New Zealand	3	0	0	3	3	10	−7	0	

Source: FIFA
Rules for classification: Group stage tiebreakers

5 November 2025	Mali	3–0	New Zealand	Al Rayyan, Qatar
17:45	Dembélé 17'; Ballo 55'; Bomba 78'	Report		Stadium: Aspire Zone, (pitch 2); Referee: Vasileios Fotias (Greece)

8 November 2025	Saudi Arabia	3–2	New Zealand	Al Rayyan, Qatar
18:45	Sufyani 2'; Dahal 58'; Saeed 90+1'	Report	Núñez 55'; Perniskie 83'	Stadium: Aspire Zone, (pitch 7); Referee: Oleksii Derevinskyi (Ukraine)

11 November 2025	New Zealand	1–4	Austria	Al Rayyan, Qatar
18:45	Britton 82'	Report	Jozepovic 49'; Dobis 87'; Deshishku 88', 90+4'	Stadium: Aspire Zone, (pitch 9); Referee: Tanguy Mebiame (Gabon)

=== New Zealand women’s national under-17 football team ===
==== Friendlies ====
10 October 2025 Friendly	New Zealand	4–3	Nigeria	Morocco
	Bennett; Candy	Report	Goal	Attendance: 0 (Behind closed doors)

15 October 2025 Friendly	New Zealand	0–5	China	Morocco
		Report	Goal	Attendance: 0 (Behind closed doors)

==== 2025 OFC U-16 Women's Championship ====
===== Group B =====
Pos	Team	Pld	W	D	L	GF	GA	GD	Pts	Qualification
1	New Zealand	3	3	0	0	15	0	+15	9	Knockout stage
2	Solomon Islands	3	2	0	1	2	5	−3	6	Knockout stage
3	Tonga	3	1	0	2	2	6	−4	3	
4	American Samoa	3	0	0	3	1	9	−8	0	

Source: OFC

2 August 2025	New Zealand	4–0	Tonga	Samoa Football HQ, Apia
15:00	Robson 25', 45', 90+6'; Humphrey 67'	Report		Attendance: 250; Referee: Kyllian Lelarge (New Caledonia)

5 August 2025	New Zealand	5–0	Solomon Islands	Samoa Football HQ, Apia
15:00	Rice 37'; Humphrey 45+2'; Hitchcock 56'; Fili 74'; Summers 83'	Report		Referee: Torika Delai (Fiji)

8 August 2025	American Samoa	0–6	New Zealand	Samoa Football HQ, Apia
15:00		Report	Vosper 26'; Sharkey 43'; Robson 45+3'; Gray 63'; Summers 66'; Chaytor 68'	Referee: Alexandra Toto (Vanuatu)

===== Knockout stage =====
11 August 2025 Semi-final	New Zealand	4–2	New Caledonia	Samoa Football HQ, Apia
15:00	Robson 15'; Hitchcock 52'; Humphrey 55', 88'	Report	Hmaen 29'; Buama 90+12'	Referee: Shama Maemae (Solomon Islands)

14 August 2025 Final	Samoa	0–3	New Zealand	Samoa Football HQ, Apia
15:00		Report	Fili 6'; Hitchcock 18'; Robson 29'	Referee: Torika Delai (Fiji)

==== 2025 FIFA U-17 Women's World Cup ====
===== Group F =====
Pos	Team	Pld	W	D	L	GF	GA	GD	Pts	Qualification
1	Japan	3	2	1	0	6	1	+5	7	Knockout stage
2	Paraguay	3	2	1	0	7	3	+4	7	Knockout stage
3	Zambia	3	1	0	2	5	4	+1	3	Knockout stage
4	New Zealand	3	0	0	3	1	11	−10	0	

Source: FIFA
Rules for classification: Group stage tiebreakers

19 October 2025	Japan	3–0	New Zealand	Salé, Morocco
14:00	Aoki 38' (pen.); Fukushima 75'; Shikida 84'	Report		Stadium: Mohammed VI Football Academy (pitch 3); Attendance: 204; Referee: Josephine Wanjiru (Kenya)

22 October 2025	Paraguay	4–1	New Zealand	Salé, Morocco
20:00	Martínez 49', 54', 65'; Florentín 67'	Report	Pugh 30'	Stadium: Mohammed VI Football Academy (pitch 3); Attendance: 1,345; Referee: Yacine Samassa (Mauritania)

25 October 2025	New Zealand	0–4	Zambia	Salé, Morocco
20:00		Report	Mbali 33'; Chipasula 44'; Sekeseke 69'; Muller 80' (o.g.)	Stadium: Mohammed VI Football Academy (pitch 2); Attendance: 1,479; Referee: Paula Fernández (Colombia)

== FIFA competitions ==
=== FIFA Club World Cup ===
==== Group C ====
Pos	Team	Pld	W	D	L	GF	GA	GD	Pts	Qualification
1	(Portugal) Benfica	3	2	1	0	9	2	+7	7	Advance to knockout stage
2	(Germany) Bayern Munich	3	2	0	1	12	2	+10	6	Advance to knockout stage
3	(Argentina) Boca Juniors	3	0	2	1	4	5	−1	2	
4	(New Zealand) Auckland City	3	0	1	2	1	17	−16	1	

Source: FIFA

15 June 2025	Bayern Munich (Germany)	10–0	(New Zealand) Auckland City	Cincinnati, United States
12:00 pm EDT	Coman 6', 21'; Boey 18'; Olise 20', 45+3'; Müller 45', 89'; Musiala 67', 73' (pen.), 84'	Report		Stadium: TQL Stadium; Attendance: 21,152; Referee: Issa Sy (Senegal)

20 June 2025	Benfica (Portugal)	6–0	(New Zealand) Auckland City	Orlando, United States
12:00 pm EDT	Carreras (yellow card) 45+4'; Di María 45+8' (pen.), 90+8' (pen.); Kökçü (yellow card) 48'; Pavlidis 53'; Renato Sanches 63'; Barreiro 76', 78'; Bajrami (yellow card) 87'	Report		Stadium: Inter&Co Stadium; Attendance: 6,730; Referee: Salman Falahi (Qatar)
Note: At 1:06 pm EDT, during the half-time break, the match was interrupted due to adverse weather conditions. The match was resumed at 3:20 pm EDT.

24 June 2025	Auckland City (New Zealand)	1–1	(Argentina) Boca Juniors	Nashville, United States
2:00 pm CDT	Gray 52'	Report	Garrow 26' (o.g.)	Stadium: Geodis Park; Attendance: 16,899; Referee: Glenn Nyberg (Sweden)
Note: At 3:21 pm CDT, in the 54th minute, the match was interrupted due to adverse weather conditions. The match was resumed at 4:10 pm.

=== FIFA Intercontinental Cup ===
14 September 2025 First round	Pyramids (Egypt)	3–0	(New Zealand) Auckland City	Cairo, Egypt
21:00 EGY	El Karti 14'; Hamdy 74'; Ziko 85'	Report		Stadium: 30 June Stadium; Attendance: 4,157; Referee: Adham Makhadmeh (Jordan)

=== 2026 FIFA Women's Champions Cup ===
8 October 2025 Round 1	Wuhan Jiangda (China)	1–0	(New Zealand) Auckland United	Wuhan, China
16:00 UTC+8	Jiang Chenjing 88'	Report		Stadium: Wuhan Sports Center; Attendance: 32,318; Referee: Bouchra Karboubi (Morocco)

== OFC Competitions ==
=== OFC Champions League ===
==== Group A ====
Pos	Team	Pld	W	D	L	GF	GA	GD	Pts	Qualification	AUC	TIG	PIR	REW
1	(New Zealand) Auckland City	3	2	1	0	4	1	+3	7	Knockout stage	—	2−0	1–0	—
2	(New Caledonia) Tiga Sport	3	1	1	1	5	5	0	4	Knockout stage	—	—	—	4–2
3	(French Polynesia) Pirae	3	1	1	1	2	2	0	4		—	1–1	—	—
4	(Fiji) Rewa	3	0	1	2	3	6	−3	1		1–1	—	0−1	—

Source: OFC

30 March 2025	Auckland City (New Zealand)	1–0	(French Polynesia) Pirae	Lawson Tama Stadium, Honiara
15:00 UTC+11	Manickum 41'	Report		Attendance: 2,000; Referee: Ben Aukwai (Solomon Islands)

2 April 2025	Auckland City (New Zealand)	2−0	(New Caledonia) Tiga Sport	Lawson Tama Stadium, Honiara
15:00 UTC+11	Manickum 25'; Zeb 90+4'	Report		Attendance: 1,635; Referee: Facundo Tello (Argentina)

5 April 2025	Rewa (Fiji)	1–1	(New Zealand) Auckland City	Lawson Tama Stadium, Honiara
15:00 UTC+11	Orobulu 90+5'	Report	Zeb 12'	Attendance: 1,077; Referee: Norbert Hauata (Tahiti)

==== Knockout stage ====
9 April 2025	Auckland City (New Zealand)	2−0	(Vanuatu) Ifira Black Bird	Honiara, Solomon Islands
12:00 (UTC+11)	Zeb 25'; Bevan 86'	Report		Stadium: National Stadium; Attendance: 1,125; Referee: Norbert Hauata (Tahiti)

===== Final =====
12 April 2025	Auckland City (New Zealand)	2–0	(Papua New Guinea) Hekari United	Honiara, Solomon Islands
18:00 (UTC+11)	Bevan 39', 83' (pen.)	Report		Stadium: National Stadium; Attendance: 6,000; Referee: Facundo Tello (Argentina)

=== OFC Women's Champions League ===
==== Group B ====
Pos	Team	Pld	W	D	L	GF	GA	GD	Pts	Qualification	AUC	HEK	PIR	PAN
1	(New Zealand) Auckland United	3	3	0	0	24	1	+23	9	Advance to semi-finals	—	—	—	11–0
2	(Papua New Guinea) Hekari Women's	3	2	0	1	15	2	+13	6	Advance to semi-finals	1–2	—	2–0	—
3	(French Polynesia) Pirae (H)	3	1	0	2	6	13	−7	3		0–11	—	—	6–0
4	(American Samoa) PanSa	3	0	0	3	0	29	−29	0		—	0–12	—	—

Source: OFC
(H) Hosts

5 May 2025	Pirae (French Polynesia)	0–11	(New Zealand) Auckland United	Pirae
15:00 (UTC-10:00)		Report	Benson 6', 8', 19', 42', 45'; Canham 10', 38'; Pritchard 45'; Dugan 74', 90'; Roche 90+6'	Stadium: Stade Pater; Attendance: 250; Referee: Anahí Fernández (Uruguay)

8 May 2024	Hekari Womens (Papua New Guinea)	1–2	(New Zealand) Auckland United	Pirae
12:00 (UTC-10:00)	Waida 90'	Report	Granger 42'; Pritchard 55'	Stadium: Stade Pater; Attendance: 200; Referee: Anahí Fernández (Uruguay)

11 May 2024	Auckland United (New Zealand)	11–0	(American Samoa) PanSa	Pirae
12:00 (UTC-10:00)	Knott 6', 21', 30'; Pritchard 19' (pen.); Philpot 23'; A. Vosper 40'; Vlok 51', 85', 90+2'; S. Vosper 81'; McConnell 89'	Report		Stadium: Stade Pater; Attendance: 200; Referee: Jovita Ambrose (Solomon Islands)

==== Knockout stage ====
14 May 2025	Auckland United (New Zealand)	6–1	(Solomon Islands) Henderson Eels	Pirae
15:00	Dugan 3'; Benson 5', 18', 28'; Pritchard 7'; Canham 47'	Report	Pegi 26'	Stadium: Stade Pater; Attendance: 200; Referee: Anahí Fernández (Uruguay)

===== Final =====
17 May 2025	Hekari United (Papua New Guinea)	0–1	(New Zealand) Auckland United	Pirae
14:00 UTC−10		Report	Canham 26'	Stadium: Stade Pater; Attendance: 300; Referee: Anahí Fernández (Uruguay)

== Men's football ==
League	Promoted to league	Relegated from league	New
Northern League	Fencibles United	Hamilton Wanderers; Melville United	Auckland FC Reserves
Central League	Upper Hutt City	Stop Out Sports Club	None
Southern League	Wānaka	FC Twenty 11	None

=== National League ===
Pos	Team	Pld	W	D	L	GF	GA	GD	Pts	Qualification
1	Wellington Olympic	10	7	0	3	23	14	+9	21	Qualification to Grand Final
2	Auckland City (C)	10	6	2	2	19	14	+5	20	Qualification to Grand Final and Champions League group stage
3	Miramar Rangers	10	6	1	3	25	14	+11	19	
4	Auckland FC Reserves (Note: Auckland FC Reserves and Wellington Phoenix Reserves can not qualify for the Grand Final.)	10	5	3	2	17	10	+7	18	
5	Western Springs	10	5	1	4	16	13	+3	16	
6	Birkenhead United	10	5	0	5	20	21	−1	15	
7	Christchurch United	10	4	2	4	16	19	−3	14	
8	Western Suburbs	10	3	1	6	19	21	−2	10	
9	Wellington Phoenix Reserves	10	3	1	6	18	21	−3	10	
10	Auckland United	10	2	2	6	11	19	−8	8	
11	Coastal Spirit	10	2	1	7	5	23	−18	7	

Source: New Zealand Football
Rules for classification: 1) Points; 2) Goal difference; 3) Goals for; 4) Goals against; 5) Head to head; 6) Disciplinary record
(C) Champions

==== Grand final ====
13 December 2025
18:00 NZDT

Wellington Olympic	2–2 (a.e.t.)	Auckland City
Stoupe 90+3'; Prins 101'	Report	Ellis 81'; Gray 120+2'
Penalties
Mata (penalty scored); Prins (penalty scored); Mason-Smith (penalty scored); Davenport-Petersen (penalty scored); Solomon (penalty missed); Reynolds (penalty scored); Barclay (penalty scored); Davies (penalty missed)	6–7	(penalty missed) Ilich; (penalty scored) Zeb; (penalty scored) Ellis; (penalty scored) Kilkolly; (penalty scored) Gray; (penalty scored) Lobo; (penalty scored) Manickum; (penalty scored) Boxall

Newtown Park, Wellington
Referee: Calvin Berg

=== Northern League ===
Pos	Team	Pld	W	D	L	GF	GA	GD	Pts	Qualification
1	Western Springs (C)	22	13	3	6	44	30	+14	42	Winner of Northern League and qualification to National League Championship
2	Birkenhead United	22	12	5	5	55	33	+22	41	Qualification to National League Championship
3	Auckland United	22	12	4	6	47	32	+15	40	Qualification to National League Championship
4	Auckland City	22	12	4	6	35	24	+11	40	Qualification to National League Championship
5	Eastern Suburbs	22	12	4	6	35	27	+8	40	
6	East Coast Bays	22	10	6	6	32	27	+5	36	
7	Tauranga City	22	9	3	10	42	38	+4	30	
8	Bay Olympic	22	6	6	10	26	36	−10	24	
9	Auckland FC Reserves (Note: Auckland FC Reserves gain automatic entry into the National League Championship phase and cannot be relegated due to the A-League Men requirements.)	22	6	5	11	33	37	−4	23	Qualification to National League Championship
10	Fencibles United	22	5	6	11	37	49	−12	21	
11	Manurewa (R)	22	4	4	14	24	57	−33	16	Relegation to NRFL Championship
12	West Coast Rangers (R)	22	3	6	13	26	46	−20	15	Relegation to NRFL Championship

Source: NRF
Rules for classification: 1) Points; 2) Goal difference; 3) Goals scored; 4) Goals against; 5) Head to head; 6) Disciplinary record; 7) Coin toss
(C) Champions; (R) Relegated

=== Central League ===
Pos	Team	Pld	W	D	L	GF	GA	GD	Pts	Qualification
1	Wellington Olympic (C)	18	16	1	1	64	14	+50	49	Winner of Central League and qualification to National League Championship
2	Miramar Rangers	18	12	3	3	53	22	+31	39	Qualification to National League Championship
3	Western Suburbs	18	10	4	4	57	24	+33	34	Qualification to National League Championship
4	Wellington Phoenix Reserves (Note: Wellington Phoenix Reserves gain automatic entry into the National League Championship phase and cannot be relegated due to the A-League Men requirements.)	18	8	5	5	44	26	+18	29	Qualification to National League Championship
5	Napier City Rovers	18	8	4	6	45	24	+21	28	
6	Island Bay United	18	5	4	9	32	32	0	19	
7	Waterside Karori	18	4	4	10	29	70	−41	16	
8	Upper Hutt City	18	3	5	10	20	50	−30	14	
9	Petone	18	4	1	13	20	47	−27	13	
10	North Wellington (R)	18	1	7	10	29	76	−47	10	Relegation to Central League 2

Source: Capital Football
Rules for classification: 1) Points; 2) Goal difference; 3) Goals scored; 4) Goals against; 5) Head to head; 6) Disciplinary record; 7) Coin toss
(C) Champions; (R) Relegated

=== Southern League ===
Pos	Team	Pld	W	D	L	GF	GA	GD	Pts	Qualification
1	Coastal Spirit (C)	18	14	0	4	56	21	+35	42	Winner of Southern League and qualification to National League Championship
2	Christchurch United	18	12	4	2	66	13	+53	40	Qualification to National League Championship
3	Cashmere Technical	18	12	3	3	59	29	+30	39	
4	Nelson Suburbs	18	9	3	6	42	27	+15	30	
5	Nomads United	18	8	4	6	44	35	+9	28	
6	Ferrymead Bays	18	8	4	6	33	32	+1	28	
7	Dunedin City Royals	18	7	5	6	39	31	+8	26	
8	Wānaka	18	5	0	13	23	58	−35	15	
9	University of Canterbury (R)	18	1	2	15	20	78	−58	5	Relegated to Canterbury Premiership (Note: University of Canterbury were relegated after withdrawing from the 2026 Southern League.)
10	Selwyn United	18	0	3	15	20	78	−58	3	

Source: Mainland Football
Rules for classification: 1) Points; 2) Goal difference; 3) Goals scored; 4) Goals against; 5) Head to head; 6) Disciplinary record; 7) Coin toss
(C) Champions; (R) Relegated

=== Cup Competitions ===
==== Chatham Cup ====
===== Final =====
7 September 2025
13:00

Auckland United	2–4	Wellington Olympic
Vollenhoven 17'; Curry 73'	Report	Watson 4', 68'; Prins 34'; Sinclair 59'

North Harbour Stadium, Albany
Referee: Cory Mills

==== Charity Cup ====
2025 Charity Cup

== Women's football ==
=== National Women's League ===
Pos	Team	Pld	W	D	L	GF	GA	GD	Pts	Qualification
1	Auckland United (C)	9	7	1	1	31	3	+28	22	Qualification to Grand Final
2	Eastern Suburbs	9	6	2	1	30	6	+24	20	Qualification to Grand Final
3	CF Wellington United	9	6	1	2	39	14	+25	19	
4	West Coast Rangers	9	5	2	2	18	7	+11	17	
5	Southern United	9	4	1	4	20	15	+5	13	
6	Western Springs	9	4	0	5	31	17	+14	12	
7	Wellington Phoenix Reserves (Note: Wellington Phoenix Reserves can not qualify for the Grand Final.)	9	3	2	4	19	24	−5	11	
8	Canterbury United Pride	9	3	1	5	17	32	−15	10	
9	CF Petone	9	2	0	7	6	24	−18	6	
10	Central Football (W)	9	0	0	9	0	69	−69	0	Withdrew from the 2026 Seasoin

Source: New Zealand Football
Rules for classification: 1) Points; 2) Goal difference; 3) Goals for; 4) Head to head; 5) Disciplinary record; 6) Coin toss
(C) Champions; (W) Withdrew

==== Grand final ====
29 November 2025
18:00 NZDT

Auckland United	1–0	Eastern Suburbs
Benson 36'	Report

Keith Hay Park, Mount Roskill, Auckland
Attendance: Sarah Jones

=== NRFL Women’s Premiership ===
Pos	Team	Pld	W	D	L	GF	GA	GD	Pts	Qualification
1	West Coast Rangers (C)	21	16	2	3	65	24	+41	50	Winner of NRFL Premiership and qualification to National League Championship
2	Auckland United	21	16	1	4	75	17	+58	49	Qualification to National League Championship
3	Eastern Suburbs	21	14	2	5	62	22	+40	44	Qualification to National League Championship
4	Western Springs	21	9	6	6	46	27	+19	33	Qualification to National League Championship
5	Fencibles United	21	7	6	8	32	38	−6	27	
6	Ellerslie	21	5	5	11	33	52	−19	20	
7	FC Tauranga Moana	21	3	1	17	22	99	−77	10	
8	Hibiscus Coast (R)	21	2	1	18	11	67	−56	7	Relegation to NRFL Women's Championship

Source: Northern Region Football
Rules for classification: 1) Points; 2) Goal difference; 3) Goals scored; 4) Goals against; 5) Head to head; 6) Disciplinary record; 7) Coin toss
(C) Champions; (R) Relegated

== Deaths ==
- 4 March 2025: Michael Jones, 76, New Zealand, Seatoun and Stop Out defender.
- 8 March 2025: Nick Davidson, 79, honorary New Zealand Football President.
- 16 April 2025: Iain Gillies, 89, New Zealand and Eastern Union defender.
- 30 October 2025: Alan Vest, 86, New Zealand and Gisborne City forward.
- 16 December 2025: Alan Marley, 74, New Zealand and Christchurch United forward.

== Retirements ==
- 2 September 2025: Scott Morris, 24, former Auckland FC goalkeeper.
- 2 November 2025: Ali Riley, 38, former New Zealand defender.

== New clubs ==
- Auckland FC (OFC Professional League)
- Auckland FC Reserves
- South Island United
- Timaru United
- Ōhau Football Club
