= 2025 OFC Women's Champions League final =

- Event: 2025 OFC Women's Champions League
Hekari Women's	Auckland United
(Papua New Guinea)	(New Zealand)
0	1
- Date: 17 May 2025
- Venue: Stade Pater, Pirae
- Man of the Match: Danielle Canham (Auckland United)
- Referee: Anahí Fernández (Uruguay)
- Attendance: 300

The 2025 OFC Women's Champions League final was the final match of the 2025 OFC Women's Champions League, the 3rd edition of the OFC Women's Champions League, Oceania's premier women's club football tournament organized by the Oceania Football Confederation (OFC). It took place at Stade Pater in Pirae on 17 May 2025. The winner will qualify for the inaugural FIFA Women's Champions Cup to be held in 2026.

The final was between Papua New Guinea's Hekari United and New Zealand's Auckland United, a rematch of the previous years' final.

Auckland United successfully defended their title.

== Teams ==
Team	Previous finals appearances (bold indicates winners)
(Papua New Guinea) Hekari United	1 (2024)
(New Zealand) Auckland United	1 (**2024**)

== Road to the final ==
Note: In all results below, the score of the finalist is given first (H: home; A: away; N: neutral).

(Papua New Guinea) Hekari Women's		Round	(New Zealand) Auckland United	
Opponent	Result	Group stage	Opponent	Result
(American Samoa) PanSa	12–0	Matchday 1	(French Polynesia) Pirae	11–0
(New Zealand) Auckland United	1–2	Matchday 2	(Papua New Guinea) Hekari Women's	2–1
(French Polynesia) Pirae	2–0	Matchday 3	(American Samoa) PanSa	11–0
**Group B runners-up**: Pos / Team / Pld / Pts; 1 / (New Zealand) Auckland United / 3 / **9**; **2** / (Papua New Guinea) Hekari Women's / **3** / **6**; 3 / (French Polynesia) Pirae (H) / 3 / **3**; 4 / (American Samoa) PanSa / 3 / **0**; Source: OFC (H) Hosts		Final standings	**Group B winners**: Pos / Team / Pld / Pts; **1** / (New Zealand) Auckland United / **3** / **9**; 2 / (Papua New Guinea) Hekari Women's / 3 / **6**; 3 / (French Polynesia) Pirae (H) / 3 / **3**; 4 / (American Samoa) PanSa / 3 / **0**; Source: OFC (H) Hosts	
Opponent	Result	Knockout stage	Opponent	Result
(Fiji) Ba Women	6–1	Semi-finals	(Solomon Islands) Henderson Eels	6–1

== Match ==
17 May 2025
14:00 UTC−10

Hekari United (Papua New Guinea)	0–1	(New Zealand) Auckland United
	Report	Canham 26'

Stade Pater, Pirae
Attendance: 300
Referee: Anahí Fernández (Uruguay)

**Hekari United**	**Auckland United**

GK	14	(Papua New Guinea) Gloria Laeli	(substituted off) 90+1'
RB	4	(Papua New Guinea) Raynata Samuel	(substituted off) 42'
CB	2	(Fiji) Maria Veronika
CB	12	(Papua New Guinea) Shalom Waida	(substituted off) 46'
LB	6	(Papua New Guinea) Serah Waida
CM	8	(Papua New Guinea) Mavis Singara
CM	16	(Papua New Guinea) Phylis Pala
CM	19	(Fiji) Adi Bakaniceva
RW	11	(Papua New Guinea) Nenny Elipas
CF	9	(Papua New Guinea) Marie Kaipu (c)	(substituted off) 81'
LW	13	(Papua New Guinea) Michaelyne Butubu
Substitutes:
GK	1	(Papua New Guinea) Betty Sam
GK	18	(Papua New Guinea) Christable Maneo	(substituted on) 90+1'
DF	21	(Papua New Guinea) Hortance Kimit
DF	26	(Papua New Guinea) Grace Batiy	(substituted on) 42'
FW	10	(Papua New Guinea) Calista Maneo	(substituted on) 81'
	3	(Papua New Guinea) Kila Doura
	7	(Papua New Guinea) Ramona Padio
	24	(Papua New Guinea) Salome Toboraya	(substituted on) 46'
	25	(Papua New Guinea) Carwin Hakaria
Manager:
(Papua New Guinea) Ericson Komeng

GK	1	(United States) Hannah Mitchell
RB	2	(New Zealand) Talisha Green (c)
CB	12	(New Zealand) Alaina Granger	(substituted off) 78'
CB	4	(New Zealand) Greer MacIntosh
LB	15	(New Zealand) Saskia Vosper
CM	8	(New Zealand) Danielle Canham
CM	6	(Japan) Yume Harashima
CM	7	(New Zealand) Chloe Knott	(substituted off) 78'
RW	9	(New Zealand) Pia Vlok
CF	18	(New Zealand) Ava Pritchard	(substituted off) 63'
LW	13	(New Zealand) Zoe Benson	(substituted off) 78'
Substitutes:
GK	22	(New Zealand) Scarlett Gray
DF	3	(New Zealand) Jess Philpot	(substituted on) 78'
DF	16	(New Zealand) Ariana Vosper
DF	21	(New Zealand) Kate McConnell
MF	17	(New Zealand) Penny Brill
MF	20	(New Zealand) Tupelo Dugan	(substituted on) 78'
MF	23	(New Zealand) Piper O'Neill
FW	11	(New Zealand) Rene Wasi	(substituted on) 63'
FW	14	(New Zealand) Alexis Cook	(substituted on) 78'
Manager:
(New Zealand) Ben Bate

Man of the Match:
Danielle Canham (Auckland United)

Assistant referees:
Natalia Lumukana (Solomon Islands)
Daiana Fernández (Uruguay)
Fourth official:
Torika Delai (Fiji)
Fifth official:
Belén Clavijo (Uruguay)

**Match rules**

- 90 minutes.
- 30 minutes of extra time if scores level.
- Penalty shoot-out if scores still level.
- Maximum of five substitutions.
