= 2028 FIFA Women's Club World Cup qualification =

Qualification process for participants

The 2028 FIFA Women's Club World Cup qualification is the qualifying process which decides the 19 participants in the 2028 FIFA Women's Club World Cup. The final tournament will be played in the United States from January 5 to 30, 2028.

The teams qualified based on performance in their respective confederations' club championships.

== Slot allocation ==
On March 5, 2025, the FIFA Council approved the slot allocation for the 2028 tournament. UEFA was awarded the most slots with six. The AFC, CAF, CONMEBOL and CONCACAF were all given three slots, while the OFC was given one slot. On October 22, 2026, the FIFA Council approved the key principles of the access list for the tournament. The principles were as follows, considering competitions completed during a four-year period from 2024 to 2027:

- UEFA (six slots): access for the winners of the confederation's top club competition between 2024 and 2027, with additional teams determined by a club ranking of the four-year period
- AFC, CAF, CONMEBOL, CONCACAF and OFC (three slots or fewer): access for the highest-ranked club(s) among the winners of the confederation's top club competition between 2024 and 2027

If a club winning multiple seasons of their confederation's top club competition results in unfilled slots, additional teams will be determined by a club ranking of the four-year period. For UEFA only, a restriction of two clubs per association was applied, with an exception for champion clubs if more than two clubs from the same association won their confederation's top club competition. The calculation method for the four-year club rankings within each confederation will be based on sporting criteria during seasons completed between 2024 and 2027, and will be finalized after consultation with confederations and stakeholders. Each confederation will qualify one team to the play-in round and the remaining teams will qualify directly to the group stage.

== Qualified teams ==
The following teams qualified for the tournament:

Confederation	Team(s)	Qualification	Qualified date(s)
AFC (3 slots)	(China) Wuhan Jiangda	Winner of the 2024–25 AFC Women's Champions League	October 22, 2026 (Note: The teams' participation was confirmed on October 22, 2026, with the approval of the access list. However, the teams won the competitions (that eventually qualified them for the Club World Cup) on the following dates: Barcelona (25 May 2024), Wuhan Jiangda (24 May 2025), Arsenal (24 May 2025), Gotham FC (24 May 2025), Naegohyang (23 May 2026), América (23 May 2026). Corinthians' qualification depended on winning a second season, which was achieved on 18 October 2025.)
AFC (3 slots)	(North Korea) Naegohyang	Winner of the 2025–26 AFC Women's Champions League	October 22, 2026
AFC (3 slots)		Winner of the 2026–27 AFC Women's Champions League	May 22, 2027
CAF (3 slots)	(Democratic Republic of the Congo) TP Mazembe	Winner of the 2024 CAF Women's Champions League	November 15, 2026
CAF (3 slots)	(Morocco) AS FAR	Winner of the 2025 and 2026 CAF Women's Champions League	November 15, 2026
CAF (3 slots)		Winner of the 2027 CAF Women's Champions League	
CONCACAF (3 slots)	(United States) Gotham FC	Winner of the 2024–25 CONCACAF W Champions Cup	October 22, 2026
CONCACAF (3 slots)	(Mexico) América	Winner of the 2025–26 CONCACAF W Champions Cup	October 22, 2026
CONCACAF (3 slots)		Winner of the 2027 CONCACAF W Champions Cup	
CONMEBOL (3 slots)	(Brazil) Corinthians	Winner of the 2024 and 2025 Copa Libertadores Femenina	October 22, 2026
CONMEBOL (3 slots)	(Brazil) Cruzeiro	Winner of the 2026 Copa Libertadores Femenina	October 31, 2026
CONMEBOL (3 slots)		Winner of the 2027 Copa Libertadores Femenina	
OFC (1 slot)		Best ranked winner of the OFC Women's Champions League (2024 to 2027)	
UEFA (6 slots)	(Spain) Barcelona	Winner of the 2023–24 and 2025–26 UEFA Women's Champions League	October 22, 2026
UEFA (6 slots)	(England) Arsenal	Winner of the 2024–25 UEFA Women's Champions League	October 22, 2026
UEFA (6 slots)		Winner of the 2026–27 UEFA Women's Champions League	May 2027
UEFA (6 slots)		Best ranked eligible team in the UEFA four-year ranking	
UEFA (6 slots)		Second-best ranked eligible team in the UEFA four-year ranking	
UEFA (6 slots)		Third-best ranked eligible team in the UEFA four-year ranking	

== Confederation qualification ==
FIFA will work with the confederations to establish a calculation method for the club rankings within each confederation based on sporting merit.

Key
Qualified through winning the competition (stage not yet known)

=== AFC Women's Champions League ===
As the competition was created in 2024–25, every competition winner qualifies. The third slot will go to the 2026–27 winner, unless Naegohyang win, in which case the slot will go to the best non-winner on club rankings. Table showing the performances of the competition winners, and all remaining teams currently in contention for the final season.

AFC ranking
Team	Performance		
Team	2024–25	2025–26	2026–27
(China) Wuhan Jiangda	Champion	Quarter-finals	–
(North Korea) Naegohyang	–	Champion	Quarter-finals
(Australia) Melbourne City	Final	Semi-finals	Quarter-finals
(Uzbekistan) Nasaf	–	Quarter-finals	Quarter-finals
(India) East Bengal	–	Group stage	Quarter-finals
(North Korea) April 25	–	–	Quarter-finals
(South Korea) Hwacheon KSPO	–	–	Quarter-finals
(Japan) Kobe Leonessa	–	–	Quarter-finals
(China) Beijing Jingtan	–	–	Quarter-finals

=== CAF Women's Champions League ===
The three slots go to the three best-ranked competition winners. With AS FAR's second victory in the four-year period, every competition winner qualifies. Table showing the performances of the competition winners.

CAF ranking
Team	Performance			
Team	2024	2025	2026	2027
(Democratic Republic of the Congo) TP Mazembe	Champion	Semi-finals	–	
(Morocco) AS FAR	Finalist	Champion	Champion	

=== CONCACAF W Champions Cup ===
As the competition was created in 2024–25, every competition winner qualifies. Club ranking for CONCACAF clubs will be determined using existing methodology, exceptionally applied. Table showing the performances of the competition winners.

CONCACAF ranking
Team	Performance		
Team	2024–25	2025–26	2027
(United States) Gotham FC	Champion	Semi-finals	Group stage
(Mexico) América	Semi-finals	Champion	Group stage

=== Copa Libertadores Femenina ===
The three slots go to the three best-ranked competition winners. When the access list was announced, Corinthians had already won two seasons in the four-year period, meaning every competition winner qualifies. Table showing the performances of the competition winners.

CONMEBOL ranking
Team	Performance			
Team	2024	2025	2026	2027
(Brazil) Corinthians	Champion	Champion	Final	Group stage
(Brazil) Cruzeiro	–	–	Champion	Group stage

=== OFC Women's Champions League ===
If Auckland United win again in 2027, they will qualify for the play-in stage as the only competition winner. Otherwise, club ranking will be used to determine the best-ranked team among the two competition winners. Table showing the performances of the competition winners.

OFC ranking
Team	Performance			
Team	2024	2025	2026	2027
(New Zealand) Auckland United	Champion	Champion	Champion	

=== UEFA Women's Champions League ===
As Barcelona won twice in the four-year period, a third non-winner will qualify via club ranking. Club ranking for UEFA clubs will be determined using existing methodology, not yet confirmed. In UEFA, each FIFA association can have a maximum of two clubs qualifying. Table showing the performances of the competition winners, and all remaining teams currently in contention for the final season.

UEFA ranking
Team	Performance			
Team	2023–24	2024–25	2025–26	2026–27
(Spain) Barcelona	Champion	Final	Champion	League phase
(England) Arsenal	–	Champion	Semi-finals	League phase
(France) OL Lyonnes	Final	Semi-finals	Final	League phase
(England) Chelsea	Semi-finals	Semi-finals	Quarter-finals	League phase
(Germany) Bayern Munich	Group stage	Quarter-finals	Semi-finals	League phase
(Spain) Real Madrid	Group stage	Quarter-finals	Quarter-finals	League phase
(France) Paris Saint-Germain	Semi-finals	–	League phase	League phase
(Italy) Juventus	–	Group stage	League phase	League phase
(France) Paris FC	Group stage	–	Playoffs	League phase
(Italy) Roma	–	Group stage	League phase	League phase
(Portugal) Benfica	Quarter-finals	–	League phase	League phase
(England) Manchester City	–	Quarter-finals	–	League phase
(Belgium) OH Leuven	–	–	Playoffs	League phase
(Sweden) BK Häcken	Quarter-finals	–	–	League phase
(Denmark) HB Køge	–	–	–	League phase
(Switzerland) Servette Chênois	–	–	–	League phase
(Italy) Inter Milan	–	–	–	League phase
