= 2024 OFC Women's Champions League final =

- Event: 2024 OFC Women's Champions League
Hekari United	Auckland United
(Papua New Guinea)	(New Zealand)
0	1
- Date: 23 March 2024
- Venue: National Stadium, Honiara
- Man of the Match: Alaina Granger (Auckland United)
- Referee: Torika Delai (Fiji)
- Attendance: 510

The 2024 OFC Women's Champions League final was the final match of the 2024 OFC Women's Champions League, the 2nd edition of the OFC Women's Champions League, Oceania's premier women's club football tournament organized by the Oceania Football Confederation (OFC).

The final was a single match between Papua New Guinea's Hekari United and New Zealand's Auckland United. The match took place at National Stadium in Honiara on 23 March 2024. This was the first OFC Women's Champions League final as the first edition was a round-robin competition.

Auckland United from New Zealand won the title for the first time after they defeated the previous edition's runners-up Hekari United 1–0 in the final.

== Teams ==
Team	Previous finals appearances (bold indicates winners)
(Papua New Guinea) Hekari United	None
(New Zealand) Auckland United	None

== Venue ==
National Stadium was the venue for the final. This was the first time that the stadium hosted an OFC Women's Champions League final.

== Road to the final ==
Note: In all results below, the score of the finalist is given first (H: home; A: away; N: neutral).

(Papua New Guinea) Hekari United		Round	(New Zealand) Auckland United	
Opponent	Result	Group stage	Opponent	Result
(Vanuatu) Tafea	1–1	Matchday 1	(Fiji) Labasa	1–1
(Solomon Islands) Henderson Eels	3–0	Matchday 2	(New Caledonia) AS Academy	5–0
(Cook Islands) Avatiu	5–0	Matchday 3	(Tonga) Veitongo	1–0
**Group A winners**: Pos / Team / Pld / Pts; **1** / (Papua New Guinea) Hekari United / **3** / **7**; 2 / (Vanuatu) Tafea / 3 / **7**; 3 / (Solomon Islands) Henderson Eels (H) / 3 / **3**; 4 / (Cook Islands) Avatiu / 3 / **0**; Source: OFC (H) Hosts		Final standings	**Group B winners**: Pos / Team / Pld / Pts; **1** / (New Zealand) Auckland United / **3** / **7**; 2 / (Fiji) Labasa / 3 / **5**; 3 / (New Caledonia) AS Academy / 3 / **4**; 4 / (Tonga) Veitongo / 3 / **0**; Source: OFC	
Opponent	Result	Knockout stage	Opponent	Result
(Fiji) Labasa	2–0 (a.e.t.)	Semi-finals	(Vanuatu) Tafea	2–1 (a.e.t.)

== Format ==
If the match is level at the end of 90 minutes of normal playing time, extra time will be played (two periods of 15 minutes each), where each team would be allowed to make a fourth substitution. If still tied after extra time, the match will be decided by a penalty shoot-out to determine the winners.

== Match ==
=== Details ===
23 March 2024
15:00 UTC+11

Hekari United (Papua New Guinea)	0–1	(New Zealand) Auckland United
	Report	Johnson 25'

National Stadium, Honiara
Attendance: 510
Referee: Torika Delai (Fiji)

**Hekari United**	**Auckland United**

GK	1	(Papua New Guinea) Fidelma Watpore
RB	6	(Papua New Guinea) Serah Waida
CB	4	(Papua New Guinea) Raynata Samuel
CB	5	(Papua New Guinea) Georgina Bakani
LB	26	(Papua New Guinea) Grace Batiy	(substituted off) 65'
CM	23	(Papua New Guinea) Phylis Pala
CM	8	(Papua New Guinea) Mavis Singara
CM	17	(Papua New Guinea) Christie Maneu	(substituted off) 90+3'
RW	3	(Papua New Guinea) Anashtasia Gunemba
CF	9	(Papua New Guinea) Marie Kaipu (c)
LW	13	(Papua New Guinea) Michaelyne Butubu
Substitutes:
GK	24	(Papua New Guinea) Zaire Kuyae
	4	(Papua New Guinea) Hilda John
	6	(Papua New Guinea) Cynthia Bangita
	12	(Papua New Guinea) Nenny Elipas	(substituted on) 65'
	24	(Papua New Guinea) Shalom Waida
	15	(Papua New Guinea) Marity Sep
	23	(Papua New Guinea) Christable Maneo	(substituted on) 90+3'
	11	(Papua New Guinea) Lavina Hola
Manager:
(Papua New Guinea) Ericson Komeng

GK	1	(New Zealand) Amberley Hollis
RB	2	(New Zealand) Talisha Green (c)
CB	4	(New Zealand) Greer MacIntosh
CB	12	(New Zealand) Alaina Granger
LB	21	(New Zealand) Kate McConnell	(substituted off) 65'
CM	8	(New Zealand) Danielle Canham
CM	16	(Japan) Yume Harashima
CM	17	(New Zealand) Penny Brill	(substituted off) 65'
RW	14	(New Zealand) Alexis Cook	(substituted off) 85'
CF	11	(New Zealand) Rene Wasi	(substituted off) 90+4'
LW	9	(New Zealand) Bree Johnson	(substituted off) 65'
Substitutes:
GK	3	(New Zealand) Piper O'Neill
DF	6	(New Zealand) Riley Sheldon	(substituted on) 85'
DF	13	(New Zealand) Holly Rennell
MF	10	(New Zealand) Pia Vlok	(substituted on) 65'
MF	15	(New Zealand) Charlotte Roche	(substituted on) 90+4'
FW	19	(New Zealand) Kara McGillivray	(substituted on) 65'
FW	20	(New Zealand) Poppy O'Brien	(substituted on) 65'
Manager:
(New Zealand) Ben Bate

Man of the Match:
Alaina Granger (Auckland United)

Assistant referees:
Maria Salamasina (Samoa)
Natalia Lumukana (Solomon Islands)
Fourth official:
Shama Maemae (Solomon Islands)
Fifth official:
Lata Kaumatule (Tonga)

**Match rules**

- 90 minutes.
- 30 minutes of extra time if scores level.
- Penalty shoot-out if scores still level.
- Maximum of five substitutions.
