= Continental football championships =

Overview of continental champions in association football

The six continental confederations

This page is a list of the continental championships for clubs and national teams in association football.

The championships are organised by the respective FIFA-affiliated continental confederations: AFC (Asia), CAF (Africa), CONCACAF (North America – comprising Northern America, Central America, and the Caribbean), CONMEBOL (South America), OFC (Oceania), and UEFA (Europe).

The numbers of participating teams presented in this article only account for teams appearing in the competitions proper, and do not include those entering preliminary or qualifying rounds.

== Men's national team championships ==
=== Current ===
Confederation	Championship	Edition(s)	Inaugural edition	Teams	Most titles		Current champions	
Confederation	Championship	Edition(s)	Inaugural edition	Teams	Team(s)	Title(s)	Team	Edition
AFC	AFC Asian Cup	18	1956	24	Japan	4	Qatar	2023
CAF	Africa Cup of Nations	35	1957	24	Egypt	7	Morocco	2025
CONCACAF	CONCACAF Gold Cup	18	1991	16	Mexico	10	Mexico	2025
CONCACAF	CONCACAF Nations League	4	2019–20	41	United States	3	Mexico	2024–25
CONMEBOL	Copa América	48	1916	10	Argentina	16	Argentina	2024
OFC	OFC Men's Nations Cup	11	1973	8	New Zealand	6	New Zealand	2024
UEFA	UEFA European Championship	17	1960	24	Spain	4	Spain	2024
UEFA	UEFA Nations League	4	2018–19	55	Portugal	2	Portugal	2024–25

=== Former ===
Confederation	Championship	Edition(s)	Inaugural edition	Final edition	Teams	Most titles	
Confederation	Championship	Edition(s)	Inaugural edition	Final edition	Teams	Team	Title(s)
AFC	AFC Challenge Cup	5	2006	2014	8–16	North Korea	2
AFC	AFC Solidarity Cup	1	2016		7	Nepal	1
CAF	African Nations Championship	8	2009	2024	8–19	Morocco	3
CONCACAF	CONCACAF Championship	10	1963	1989	5–9	Costa Rica; Mexico	3
CONCACAF	CONCACAF Cup	1	2015		2	Mexico	1

== Women's national team championships ==
Confederation	Championship	Edition(s)	Inaugural edition	Teams	Most titles		Current champions	
Confederation	Championship	Edition(s)	Inaugural edition	Teams	Team	Title(s)	Team	Year
AFC	AFC Women's Asian Cup	21	1975	12	China	9	Japan	2026
CAF	Women's Africa Cup of Nations	13	1998	16	Nigeria	10	Cameroon	2026
CONCACAF	CONCACAF W Championship	11	1991	8	United States	9	United States	2022
CONCACAF	CONCACAF W Gold Cup	1	2024	12	United States	1	United States	2024
CONMEBOL	Copa América Femenina	10	1991	10	Brazil	9	Brazil	2025
CONMEBOL	CONMEBOL Women's Nations League	1	2025–26	9	Colombia	1	Colombia	2025–26
OFC	OFC Women's Nations Cup	13	1983	9	New Zealand	6	Solomon Islands	2025
UEFA	UEFA Women's Championship	14	1984	16	Germany	8	England	2025
UEFA	UEFA Women's Nations League	2	2023–24	53	Spain	2	Spain	2025

== Men's club championships ==
=== Current ===
Confederation	Championship	Edition(s)	Inaugural edition	Teams	Most titles		Current champions	
Confederation	Championship	Edition(s)	Inaugural edition	Teams	Team(s)	Title(s)	Team	Season
AFC	AFC Champions League Elite	44	1967	24	(Saudi Arabia) Al-Hilal	4	(Saudi Arabia) Al-Ahli	2025–26
AFC	AFC Champions League Two	21	2004	32	Al-Kuwait (Iraq) Al-Quwa Al-Jawiya	3	(Japan) Gamba Osaka	2025–26
AFC	AFC Challenge League	11	2005	20	(Tajikistan) Regar-TadAZ	3	Kuwait SC	2025–26
CAF	CAF Champions League	62	1964–65	16	(Egypt) Al-Ahly	12	(South Africa) Mamelodi Sundowns	2025–26
CAF	CAF Super Cup	34	1993	2	(Egypt) Al-Ahly	8	(Algeria) USM Alger	2026
CAF	CAF Confederation Cup	22	2004	16	(Tunisia) CS Sfaxien (Morocco) RS Berkane	3	(Algeria) USM Alger	2025–26
CONCACAF	CONCACAF Champions Cup	61	1962	27	(Mexico) América (Mexico) Cruz Azul	7	(Mexico) Toluca	2026
CONMEBOL	Copa Libertadores	66	1960	32	(Argentina) Independiente	7	(Brazil) Flamengo	2025
CONMEBOL	Recopa Sudamericana	34	1989	2	(Argentina) Boca Juniors	4	(Argentina) Lanús	2026
CONMEBOL	Copa Sudamericana	25	2002	32	(Argentina) Boca Juniors	3	(Argentina) Boca Juniors	2026
OFC	OFC Men's Champions League	25	1987	18	(New Zealand) Auckland City	8	(New Zealand) Auckland City	2026
OFC	OFC Professional League	1	2026	8	(New Zealand) Auckland FC	1	(New Zealand) Auckland FC	2026
UEFA	UEFA Champions League	71	1955–56	36	(Spain) Real Madrid	15	(France) Paris Saint-Germain	2025–26
UEFA	UEFA Europa League	55	1971–72	36	(Spain) Sevilla	7	(England) Aston Villa	2025–26
UEFA	UEFA Super Cup	51	1973	2	(Spain) Real Madrid	6	(France) Paris Saint-Germain	2026
UEFA	UEFA Conference League	5	2021–22	36	(England) Chelsea (England) Crystal Palace (Greece) Olympiacos (Italy) Roma (England) West Ham United	1	(England) Crystal Palace	2025–26

=== Former ===
Confederation	Championship	Edition(s)	Inaugural edition	Final edition	Teams	Most titles	
Confederation	Championship	Edition(s)	Inaugural edition	Final edition	Teams	Team(s)	Title(s)
AFC	Asian Cup Winners' Cup	12	1990–91	2001–02	17–29	(Saudi Arabia) Al-Hilal (Japan) Yokohama Marinos	2
AFC	Asian Super Cup	8	1995	2002	2	(Saudi Arabia) Al-Hilal (South Korea) Suwon Samsung Bluewings	2
CAF	African Cup Winners' Cup	29	1975	2003	15–41	(Egypt) Al-Ahly	4
CAF	CAF Cup	12	1992	2003	31–37	(Algeria) JS Kabylie	3
CAF	African Football League	1	2023		8	(South Africa) Mamelodi Sundowns	1
CONCACAF	CONCACAF Cup Winners Cup	7	1991	1998	4–11	(El Salvador) Atlético Marte (Mexico) Monterrey (Mexico) Necaxa (Mexico) Tecos	1
CONCACAF	CONCACAF Giants Cup	1	2001		12	(Mexico) América	1
CONCACAF	CONCACAF League	6	2017	2022	22	(Honduras) Olimpia	2
CONMEBOL	Copa Ganadores de Copa	1	1970		8	(Bolivia) Mariscal Santa Cruz	1
CONMEBOL	Supercopa Libertadores	10	1988	1997	13–17	(Brazil) Cruzeiro (Argentina) Independiente	2
CONMEBOL	Copa Master de Supercopa	2	1992	1995	2–4	(Argentina) Boca Juniors (Brazil) Cruzeiro	1
CONMEBOL	Copa CONMEBOL	8	1992	1999	16	(Brazil) Atlético Mineiro	2
CONMEBOL	Copa de Oro	3	1993	1996	4	(Argentina) Boca Juniors (Brazil) Cruzeiro (Brazil) Flamengo	1
CONMEBOL	Copa Master de CONMEBOL	1	1996		4	(Brazil) São Paulo	1
OFC	Oceania Cup Winners' Cup	1	1987		2	(Australia) Sydney City	1
OFC	OFC President's Cup	1	2014		6	(New Zealand) Auckland City	1
UEFA	UEFA Cup Winners' Cup	39	1960–61	1998–99	32	(Spain) Barcelona	4
UEFA	UEFA Intertoto Cup	14	1995	2008	50	(Germany) Hamburger SV (Germany) Schalke 04 (Germany) VfB Stuttgart (Spain) Villarreal	2

== Women's club championships ==
=== Current ===
Confederation	Championship	Edition(s)	Inaugural edition	Teams	Most titles		Current champions	
Confederation	Championship	Edition(s)	Inaugural edition	Teams	Team(s)	Title(s)	Team	Season
AFC	AFC Women's Champions League	2	2024–25	12	(North Korea) Naegohyang (China) Wuhan Jiangda	1	(North Korea) Naegohyang	2025–26
CAF	CAF Women's Champions League	6	2021	8	(Morocco) AS FAR	2	(Morocco) AS FAR	2026
CONCACAF	CONCACAF W Champions Cup	2	2024–25	10	(Mexico) América (United States) Gotham FC	1	(Mexico) América	2025–26
CONMEBOL	Copa Libertadores Femenina	17	2009	16	(Brazil) Corinthians	6	(Brazil) Cruzeiro	2026
OFC	OFC Women's Champions League	4	2023	7	(New Zealand) Auckland United	3	(New Zealand) Auckland United	2026
UEFA	UEFA Women's Champions League	25	2001–02	18	(France) Lyon	8	(Spain) Barcelona	2025–26
UEFA	UEFA Women's Europa Cup	1	2025–26	16	(Sweden) BK Häcken	1	(Sweden) BK Häcken	2025–26

=== Former ===
Confederation	Championship	Edition(s)	Inaugural edition	Final edition	Teams	Most titles	
Confederation	Championship	Edition(s)	Inaugural edition	Final edition	Teams	Team(s)	Title(s)
AFC	AFC Women's Club Championship	4	2019	2023	4–8	(Jordan) Amman SC (Thailand) College of Asian Scholars (Uzbekistan) Sogdiana Jizzakh (Japan) Tokyo Verdy Beleza (Japan) Urawa Red Diamonds Ladies	1

== See also ==
- Sub-continental football championships in Asia
- Timeline of association football
- Domestic football champions
