= 2025 New Zealand Women's National League =

Football Championship

New Zealand National League
- Season: 2025
- Dates: 21 March 2025 – 29 November 2025
- Champions: Auckland United
- OFC Women's Champions League: Auckland United
- Matches: 46
- Goals: 211 (4.59 per match)
- Biggest home win: Auckland United 10–0 Central Football (11 October 2025)
- Biggest away win: Central Football 0–12 Western Springs (18 October 2025)
- Highest scoring: Central Football 0–12 Western Springs (18 October 2025)
- Longest winning run: 5 Wellington United
- Longest unbeaten run: 8 Auckland United
- Longest winless run: 9 Central Football
- Longest losing run: 9 Central Football

The 2025 New Zealand Women's National League is the fifth scheduled season of the new National League since its restructuring in 2021; the 2021 National League was cancelled due to the COVID-19 pandemic in northern regions. The 2025 season will be the twenty-third season of national women's football and will again be a hybrid season. The competition will feature four teams from the NRFL Premiership representing the Northern Conference, Central Football and two Capital Football federation sides representing the Central Conference, and Canterbury United Pride and Southern United representing the Southern Conference.

== Qualifying league ==
=== 2025 NRFL Premiership ===
NRFL Premiership
- Season: 2025
- Dates: 21 March 2025 – 31 August 2025
- Champions: West Coast Rangers
- Relegated: Hibiscus Coast

Eight teams are competing in the league – the top seven teams from the previous season and the promoted side from the NRFL Women's Championship. The promoted team is FC Tauranga Moana as winners of the 2024 NRFL Women's Championship. They replaced Hamilton Wanderers.

==== Teams ====
Team	Location	Home Ground	2024 season
Auckland United	Mount Roskill, Auckland	Keith Hay Park	1st
Eastern Suburbs	Kohimarama, Auckland	Madills Farm	3rd
Ellerslie	Ellerslie, Auckland	Michaels Avenue Reserve	7th
Fencibles United	Pakuranga, Auckland	Riverhills Domain	5th
FC Tauranga Moana	Mount Maunganui	Links Avenue Reserve	1st in NRFL Women's Championship (promoted)
Hibiscus Coast	Whangaparāoa, Auckland	Stanmore Bay Park	6th
West Coast Rangers	Whenuapai, Auckland	Fred Taylor Park	2nd
Western Springs	Westmere, Auckland	Seddon Fields	4th

==== NRFL Premiership table ====
Pos	Team	Pld	W	D	L	GF	GA	GD	Pts	Qualification
1	West Coast Rangers (C)	21	16	2	3	65	24	+41	50	Winner of NRFL Premiership and qualification to National League Championship
2	Auckland United	21	16	1	4	75	17	+58	49	Qualification to National League Championship
3	Eastern Suburbs	21	14	2	5	62	22	+40	44	Qualification to National League Championship
4	Western Springs	21	9	6	6	46	27	+19	33	Qualification to National League Championship
5	Fencibles United	21	7	6	8	32	38	−6	27	
6	Ellerslie	21	5	5	11	33	52	−19	20	
7	FC Tauranga Moana	21	3	1	17	22	99	−77	10	
8	Hibiscus Coast (R)	21	2	1	18	11	67	−56	7	Relegation to NRFL Women's Championship

Source: Northern Region Football
Rules for classification: 1) Points; 2) Goal difference; 3) Goals scored; 4) Goals against; 5) Head to head; 6) Disciplinary record; 7) Coin toss
(C) Champions; (R) Relegated

==== NRFL Premiership results table ====
Home \ Away	AKU	EAS	ELL	TGM	FEN	HBC	WCR	WSP	AKU	EAS	ELL	TGM	FEN	HBC	WCR	WSP
Auckland United		2–0	4–1	9–0	1–1	3–0	4–1	2–0		1–3				5–0		4–1
Eastern Suburbs	1–3		1–0	5–0	3–0	3–0	1–2	1–2				8–0		4–0		
Ellerslie	0–3	2–2		5–2	0–2	4–0	1–5	2–2	1–6	2–8					1–4	1–3
FC Tauranga Moana	0–9	1–5	1–2		0–3	4–0	2–4	1–4	0–5		1–1		1–6	1–3		
Fencibles United	1–7	0–2	2–0	1–3		2–0	0–4	0–1		0–3	2–2					2–2
Hibiscus Coast	2–3	0–4	0–3	3–1	2–2		0–4	0–3					1–2			0–4
West Coast Rangers	2–0	3–5	1–3	7–0	2–1	4–1		2–0	1–0			7–1	2–2	4–0		
Western Springs	0–3	1–1	2–2		1–1	5–0	1–3			0–1		9–1			0–0	

First match(es) will be played: 21 March 2025. Source: Northern Region Football
Legend: Blue = home team win; Yellow = draw; Red = away team win.

== Qualified teams ==
Locations of the 2025 Women's National League Teams
Location of clubs in Auckland Region for the 2025 Women's National League season

Association	Team	Position in Regional League	App (last)	Previous best (last)
Northern League (4 berths)	West Coast Rangers	1st	2nd (2024)	5th (2024)
Northern League (4 berths)	Auckland United	2nd	4th (2024)	1st (2024)
Northern League (4 berths)	Eastern Suburbs	3rd	4th (2024)	1st (2022)
Northern League (4 berths)	Western Springs	4th	4th (2024)	2nd (2023)
Central League (3 berths)	Central Football	N/A	23rd (2024)	2nd (2004)
Central League (3 berths)	CF Petone	N/A	1st	Debut
Central League (3 berths)	CF Wellington United	N/A	3rd (2024)	6th (2024)
Southern League (2 berths)	Canterbury United Pride	N/A	23rd (2024)	1st (2020)
Southern League (2 berths)	Southern United	N/A	23rd (2024)	1st (2021)
Wellington Phoenix (automatic berth)	Wellington Phoenix Reserves	Automatic qualification	3rd (2024)	8th (2023)

== Championship phase ==
=== League table ===
Pos	Team	Pld	W	D	L	GF	GA	GD	Pts	Qualification
1	Auckland United (C)	9	7	1	1	31	3	+28	22	Qualification to Grand Final
2	Eastern Suburbs	9	6	2	1	30	6	+24	20	Qualification to Grand Final
3	CF Wellington United	9	6	1	2	39	14	+25	19	
4	West Coast Rangers	9	5	2	2	18	7	+11	17	
5	Southern United	9	4	1	4	20	15	+5	13	
6	Western Springs	9	4	0	5	31	17	+14	12	
7	Wellington Phoenix Reserves (Note: Wellington Phoenix Reserves can not qualify for the Grand Final.)	9	3	2	4	19	24	−5	11	
8	Canterbury United Pride	9	3	1	5	17	32	−15	10	
9	CF Petone	9	2	0	7	6	24	−18	6	
10	Central Football (W)	9	0	0	9	0	69	−69	0	Withdrew from the 2026 Seasoin

Source: New Zealand Football
Rules for classification: 1) Points; 2) Goal difference; 3) Goals for; 4) Head to head; 5) Disciplinary record; 6) Coin toss
(C) Champions; (W) Withdrew

=== Grand Final ===
29 November 2025
18:00 NZDT

Auckland United	1–0	Eastern Suburbs
Benson 36'	Report

Keith Hay Park, Mount Roskill, Auckland
Attendance: Sarah Jones

== See also ==
- 2025 New Zealand National League (men's)
