= Florencina Kalifa =

Samoan footballer

Florencina Kalifa is a Samoan footballer who plays as a striker for Vailima Kiwi FC. At the age of 13 she became the youngest woman to score a goal in the OFC Women's Champions League.

Kalifa is from Apia, and was educated at Leifiifi College. She started playing football at the age of five, and at the age of seven joined the Kiwi FC under 12 team. She later played in the U14, U16, U17 and U19 divisions, before joining the premier women's team in 2023. She was selected for Kiwi's team for the 2023 OFC Women's Champions League, making her OFC debut on 1 June 2023 in a match against Labasa F.C. On 5 June she became the youngest goal-scorer of the tournament, with a goal against Koloale F.C.
