= Zoe Benson =

New Zealand footballer (born 2006)

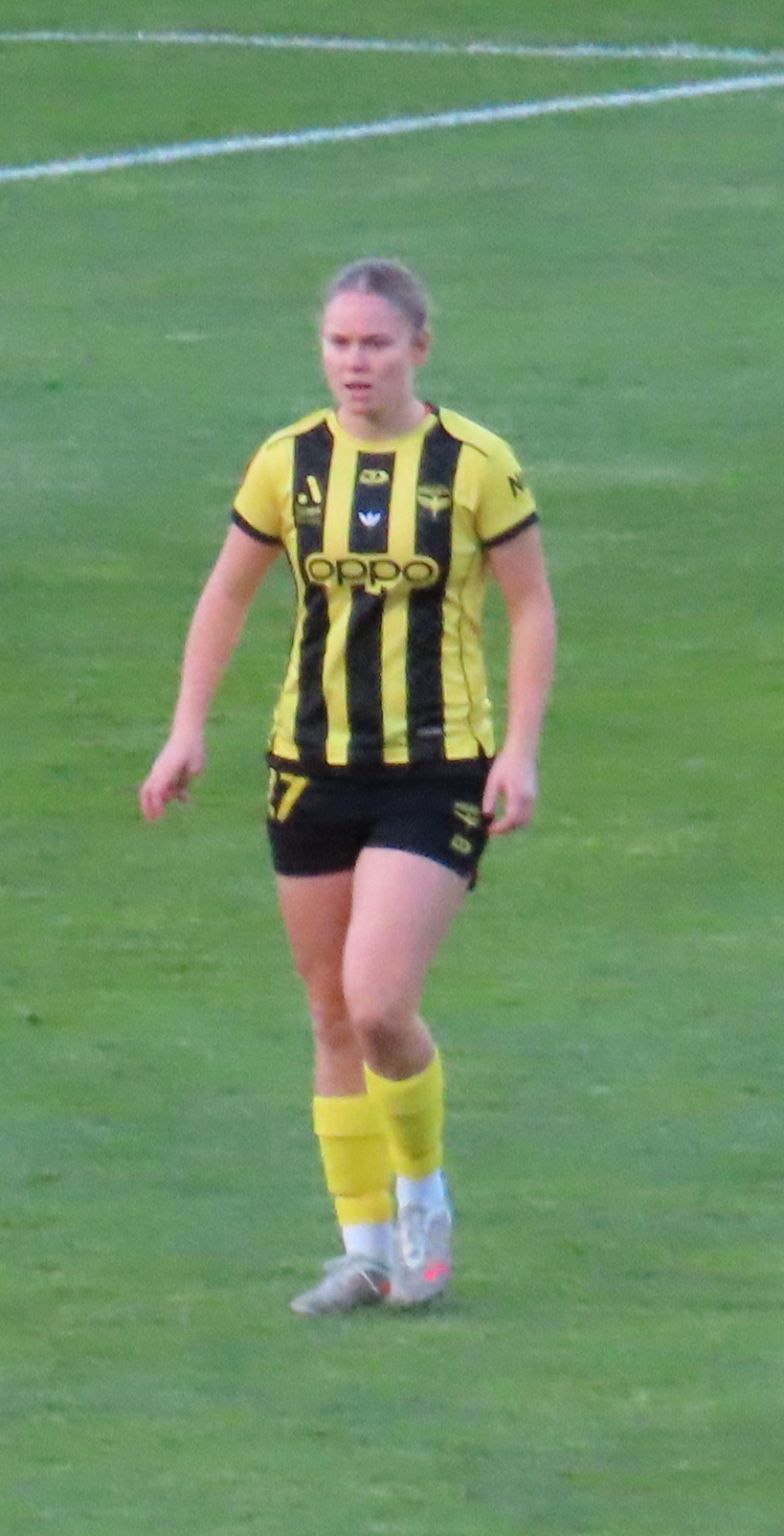
- Benson playing for the Wellington Phoenix in 2026.

Personal information
- Full name: Zoe Kate Benson
- Date of birth: 14 August 2006 (age 20)
- Height: 1.68 m (5 ft 6 in)
- Position: Forward

Team information
- Current team: Wellington Phoenix
- Number: 27

Youth career
- Bucklands Beach

Senior career*
Years	Team	Apps	(Gls)
2023–2024	Eastern Suburbs	3	(5)
2025–2026	Auckland United	4	(5)
2025–	Wellington Phoenix	15	(1)

International career^{‡}
2022	New Zealand U17	1	(0)
2023–	New Zealand U20	7	(7)
- * Club domestic league appearances and goals as of 14 September 2026 ‡ National team caps and goals as of 14 September 2026

Zoe Kate Benson (born 14 August 2006) is a New Zealand professional footballer who plays as a forward for the Wellington Phoenix of the A-League Women. She previously played for the New Zealand Women's National League (NZWNL) clubs Eastern Suburbs and Auckland United before joining the Wellington Phoenix in 2025. In 2022, Benson represented the New Zealand under-17 team, and since 2023, she has represented the national under-20 national team.

== Club career ==
=== Bucklands Beach ===
Benson played for Bucklands Beach in her youth football career.

=== Eastern Suburbs ===
From 2023 to 2024, Benson played for Eastern Suburbs of the New Zealand Women's National League (NZWNL).

=== Auckland United ===
In July 2025, Benson signed for NZWNL club Auckland United. On 29 November 2025, Benson scored the only goal of the match in the 2025 NZWNL Grand Final against her former club Eastern Suburbs. Auckland United's win was their third consecutive NZWNL championship.

In 2025, Benson formed part of the Auckland United team that successfully defended their Rennell Cup title. She became the first player to score in every match of the competition and the first to represent both Rennell Cup clubs (Auckland United and Eastern Suburbs).

Benson formed part of the Auckland United squad that also won the OFC Women's Champions League and the Kate Sheppard Cup in 2025. She played for Auckland United in the 2026 winter season, where she formed part of the squad that won the 2026 OFC Women's Champions League.

=== Wellington Phoenix ===
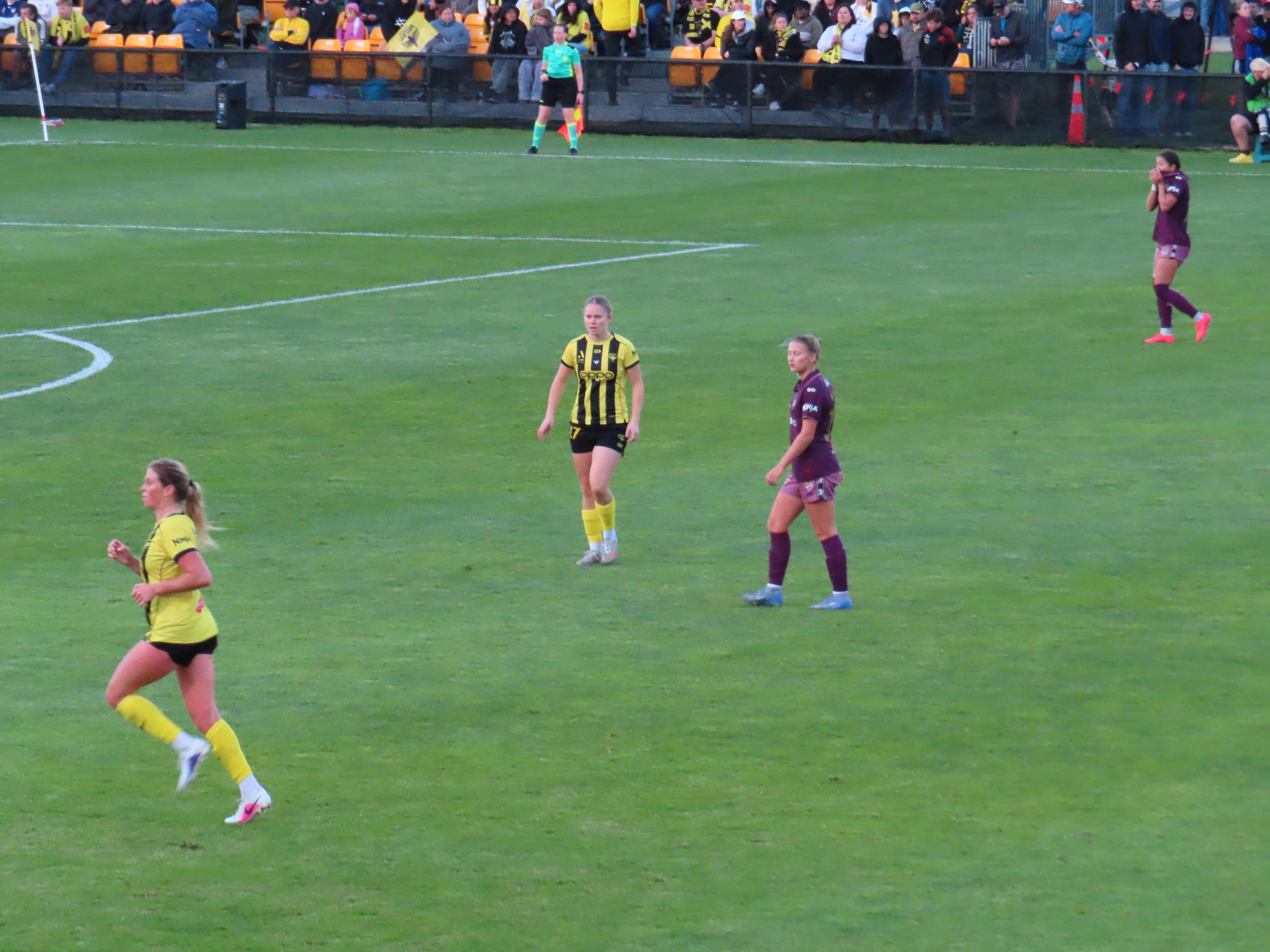
Benson playing for the Wellington Phoenix against Brisbane Roar in May 2026, with teammate Mackenzie Anthony in the foreground.

On 5 December 2025, A-League Women club Wellington Phoenix signed Benson as well as Lily Brazendale, Grace Bartlett, and Harriet Muller to youth development agreement contracts.

Two days later, on 7 December, Benson made her debut for the Phoenix in a 1–0 away loss to Melbourne City at Ctrl:cyber Pitch in Melbourne, Australia.

On 17 January 2026, Benson scored her first goal for the Phoenix in a 2–0 away win against Canberra United, where fellow youngster Pia Vlok also scored.

During the 2025–26 season, Benson made 15 appearances for the Phoenix. For the first time, the Phoenix made the finals as well as the grand final of the A-League Women. However, the New Zealand club would succumb 3–1 to Melbourne City in the grand final.

On 31 July 2026, the Wellington Phoenix signed Benson to a three-year professional contract until the end of the 2028–29 season, with the first two years of the contract being on scholarship terms.

== International career ==
=== New Zealand U17 ===
On 29 September 2022, New Zealand under-17 women's coach Leon Birnie named Benson as one of 21 players selected for the 2022 FIFA U-17 Women's World Cup in India. She made one appearance in the tournament, being substituted on in the 58th minute in a 3–1 defeat against Germany on 18 October.

=== New Zealand U20 ===
Benson formed part of the national under-20 squads named for the OFC U-19 Women's Championships in both 2023 and 2025. Benson scored 7 goals in the 2023 edition of the tournament, and 6 goals in the 2025 edition, helping New Zealand win both championships.

In 2024, Benson was named in the 21-player squad for the 2024 FIFA U-20 Women's World Cup in Colombia. Benson appeared in all three group stage matches: against Japan on 2 September, against Austria on 5 September, and against Ghana on 8 September. New Zealand exited the tournament following the conclusion of the group stage, after suffering three defeats.

On 17 August 2026, Benson was named in the 21-player squad for the 2026 FIFA U-20 Women's World Cup in Poland in September. Benson was one of two players, alongside Daisy Brazendale, to feature in this U-20 Women's World Cup as well as the 2024 edition. Additionally, she was one of nine players from the Wellington Phoenix. The Junior Football Ferns played against Japan, Italy, and the United States in Group D. Benson made two appearances in the tournament, with New Zealand exiting the tournament following the group stage's conclusion.

== Honours ==
Auckland United

- New Zealand Women's National League: 2025
- Kate Sheppard Cup: 2025
- OFC Women's Champions League: 2025, 2026

New Zealand U20

- OFC U-19 Women's Championship: 2023, 2025

Individual

- OFC Women's Champions League Golden Boot: 2025
- OFC U-19 Women's Championship Golden Ball: 2025
