= 2024 OFC Women's Champions League =

Tournament details
- Host country: Solomon Islands
- Dates: 10–23 March 2024
- Teams: 8 (from 8 associations)

Final positions
- Champions: (New Zealand) Auckland United (1st title)
- Runners-up: (Papua New Guinea) Hekari United

Tournament statistics
- Matches played: 15
- Goals scored: 42 (2.8 per match)
- Attendance: 3,862 (257 per match)
- Top scorer: (Vanuatu) Jane Alatoa (4 goals)
- Best player: (New Zealand) Talisha Green
- Best goalkeeper: (New Zealand) Amberley Hollis
- Fair play award: (New Zealand) Auckland United

The 2024 OFC Champions League was the second edition of the OFC Women's Champions League, Oceania's premier women's club football tournament organised by the Oceania Football Confederation (OFC).

It was played from 10 to 23 March in Honiara in the Solomon Islands.

Auckland United from New Zealand won the title for the first time after they defeated the previous edition's runners-up Hekari United 1–0 in the final.

== Teams ==
A total of 8 teams of 8 (out of 11) OFC member associations entered the competition. The draw was held on 17 January 2024 at OFC Home of Football in Auckland, New Zealand.

Location of teams of the 2024 OFC Women's Champions League

Association	Team	Qualifying method
Fiji	Labasa	2023 Fiji Women's Super League champions
New Caledonia	AS Academy	2023 National Championship champions
Cook Islands	Avatiu	2023 Rarotonga Club Championship champions
(New Zealand) New Zealand	Auckland United	2023 New Zealand Women's National League grand final champions
(Papua New Guinea) Papua New Guinea	Hekari United	2022–23 Papua New Guinea Women's National Soccer League champions
(Solomon Islands) Solomon Islands	Henderson Eels	2023 Women's Premier League champions
Tonga	Veitongo	2023 Tonga Women's Major League champions
Vanuatu	Tafea	2023 Vanuatu Women's Champion League champions

Associations that did not enter a team

- American Samoa
- Samoa
- Tahiti

== Format ==
After the expansion from five to eight teams, there is now a group stage of two groups of four. The top two teams advance to the semi-finals.

== Group stage ==
All times are local, SBT (UTC+11).

=== Group A ===
Pos	Team	Pld	W	D	L	GF	GA	GD	Pts	Qualification	HEK	TAF	HEN	AVA
1	(Papua New Guinea) Hekari United	3	2	1	0	9	1	+8	7	Advance to semi-finals	—	—	—	5–0
2	(Vanuatu) Tafea	3	2	1	0	8	3	+5	7	Advance to semi-finals	1–1	—	—	4–2
3	(Solomon Islands) Henderson Eels (H)	3	1	0	2	2	6	−4	3		0–3	0–3	—	—
4	(Cook Islands) Avatiu	3	0	0	3	2	11	−9	0		—	—	0–2	—

Source: OFC
(H) Hosts
10 March 2024
12:00 (UTC+11:00)

Tafea (Vanuatu)	1–1	(Papua New Guinea) Hekari United
Alatoa 37' (pen.)	Report	Pala 45+8' (pen.)

SIFF Academy, Honiara
Attendance: 300
Referee: Torika Delai (Fiji)
11 March 2024 (Note: Game was originally scheduled for 10 March but was postponed due to a waterlogged pitch.)
12:00 (UTC+11:00)

Avatiu (Cook Islands)	0–2	(Solomon Islands) Henderson Eels
	Report	Arukau 54'; Vakatao 61'

Lawson Tama Stadium, Honiara
Attendance: 261
Referee: Sarah Jones (New Zealand)

13 March 2024
12:00 (UTC+11:00)

Tafea (Vanuatu)	4–2	(Cook Islands) Avatiu
Sine 35', 45+3'; Alatoa 85', 90+6'	Report	Uini 6', 51'

Lawson Tama Stadium, Honiara
Attendance: 124
Referee: Yantama Atoa (Tonga)
13 March 2024
15:00 (UTC+11:00)

Henderson Eels (Solomon Islands)	0–3	(Papua New Guinea) Hekari United
	Report	Kaipu 20'; Gunemba 53'; Maneu 90'

Lawson Tama Stadium, Honiara
Attendance: 350
Referee: Beth Rattray (New Zealand)

16 March 2024
12:00 (UTC+11:00)

Hekari United (Papua New Guinea)	5–0	(Cook Islands) Avatiu
Kaipu 7', 51'; Gunemba 43'; Maneu 45'; Kimit 80'	Report

Lawson Tama Stadium, Honiara
Attendance: 200
Referee: Kyllian Lelarge (New Caledonia)
16 March 2024
15:00 (UTC+11:00)

Henderson Eels (Solomon Islands)	0–3	(Vanuatu) Tafea
	Report	Sine 6'; Alatoa 13'; Aiviji 54'

Lawson Tama Stadium, Honiara
Attendance: 312
Referee: Beth Rattray (New Zealand)

=== Group B ===
Group B fixtures were brought forward earlier than originally scheduled due to floodlight problems. The opening matches were pushed back a day on 10 March 2024 after the postponement of a Group A game due to waterlogged pitch.

Pos	Team	Pld	W	D	L	GF	GA	GD	Pts	Qualification	AUC	LAB	ASA	VEI
1	(New Zealand) Auckland United	3	2	1	0	7	1	+6	7	Advance to semi-finals	—	—	—	1–0
2	(Fiji) Labasa	3	1	2	0	3	1	+2	5	Advance to semi-finals	1–1	—	—	2–0
3	(New Caledonia) AS Academy	3	1	1	1	4	6	−2	4		0–5	0–0	—	—
4	(Tonga) Veitongo	3	0	0	3	1	7	−6	0		—	—	1–4	—

Source: OFC
12 March 2024
12:00 (UTC+11:00)

Veitongo (Tonga)	1–4	(New Caledonia) AS Academy
Polovili 20'	Report	Wenessia 30', 90'; Kourevi 86'; Neporo 90+4'

Lawson Tama Stadium, Honiara
Attendance: 198
Referee: Keith Kitumbing (Papua New Guinea)
12 March 2024
15:00 (UTC+11:00)

Labasa (Fiji)	1–1	(New Zealand) Auckland United
Kumar 79' (pen.)	Report	Johnson 63'

Lawson Tama Stadium, Honiara
Attendance: 300
Referee: Shama Maemae (Solomon Islands)

14 March 2024
12:00 (UTC+11:00)

AS Academy (New Caledonia)	0–5	(New Zealand) Auckland United
	Report	Wasi 4', 45+4', 54'; Brill 88'; Roche 90+2'

National Stadium, Honiara
Attendance: 100
Referee: Gideon Mamuala (Solomon Islands)
14 March 2024
15:00 (UTC+11:00)

Labasa (Fiji)	2–0	(Tonga) Veitongo
Narieta Leba 25', 39'	Report

National Stadium, Honiara
Attendance: 249
Referee: Gerard Ionatana (Samoa)

17 March 2024
12:00 (UTC+11:00)

Auckland United (New Zealand)	1–0	(Tonga) Veitongo
O'Brien 29'	Report

National Stadium, Honiara
Attendance: 150
Referee: Gerard Ionatana (Samoa)
17 March 2024
15:00 (UTC+11:00)

AS Academy (New Caledonia)	0–0	(Fiji) Labasa
	Report

National Stadium, Honiara
Attendance: 208
Referee: Keith Kitumbing (Papua New Guinea)

== Knockout stage ==
The four teams in the knockout stage played on a single-elimination basis, with each tie played as a single match at National Stadium.

=== Bracket ===
The bracket was determined as follows:

Semi-finals
20 March 2024
(Papua New Guinea) Hekari United (a.e.t.)	2
(Fiji) Labasa	0
20 March 2024
(New Zealand) Auckland United (a.e.t.)	2
(Vanuatu) Tafea	1

Final
23 March 2024
(Papua New Guinea) Hekari United	0
(New Zealand) Auckland United	1

=== Semi-finals ===
Team 1	Score	Team 2
Hekari United (Papua New Guinea)	2–0 (a.e.t.)	(Fiji) Labasa
Auckland United (New Zealand)	2–1 (a.e.t.)	(Vanuatu) Tafea

=== Final ===
In the final, the two semi-final winners played against each other. The final was played on 23 March 2024.

23 March 2024
15:00 UTC+11

Hekari United (Papua New Guinea)	0–1	(New Zealand) Auckland United
	Report	Johnson 25'

National Stadium, Honiara
Attendance: 510
Referee: Torika Delai (Fiji)

== Statistics ==
=== Top goalscorers ===
Rank	Player	Team	Goals
1	(Vanuatu) Jane Alatoa	(Vanuatu) Tafea	4
2	(Papua New Guinea) Marie Kaipu	(Papua New Guinea) Hekari United	3
2	(Papua New Guinea) Christie Maneu	(Papua New Guinea) Hekari United	3
2	(New Zealand) Rene Wasi	(New Zealand) Auckland United	3
2	(Vanuatu) Diana Sine	(Vanuatu) Tafea	3
6	(New Zealand) Bree Johnson	(New Zealand) Auckland United	2
6	(Papua New Guinea) Anashtasia Gunemba	(Papua New Guinea) Hekari United	2
6	(New Caledonia) Alice Wenessia	(New Caledonia) AS Academy	2
6	(Fiji) Narieta Leba	(Fiji) Labasa	2
6	(Cook Islands) Kimberly Uini	(Cook Islands) Avatiu	2
11	16 players		1

== Awards ==
The following awards were given at the conclusion of the tournament.

Award	Player	Team
Golden Ball	(New Zealand) Talisha Green	(New Zealand) Auckland United
Golden Boot	(Vanuatu) Jane Alatoa	(Vanuatu) Tafea
Golden Glove	(New Zealand) Amberley Hollis	(New Zealand) Auckland United
Fair Play Award	—N/a	(New Zealand) Auckland United

== See also ==
- 2024 OFC Champions League
