= 2024 OFC Women's Champions League knockout stage =

The 2024 OFC Women's Champions League knockout stage was played from 20 to 23 March 2024. A total of four teams competed in the knockout stage to decide the champions of the 2024 OFC Women's Champions League.

== Qualified teams ==
The winners and runners-up of each of the two groups in the group stage advanced to the semi-finals.

Group	Winners	Runners-up
A	(Papua New Guinea) Hekari United	(Vanuatu) Tafea
B	(New Zealand) Auckland United	(Fiji) Labasa

== Format ==
The four teams in the knockout stage played on a single-elimination basis, with each tie played as a single match at National Stadium.

== Schedule ==
The schedule of each round was as follows.

Round	Match dates
Semi-finals	20 March 2024
Final	23 March 2024 at National Stadium, Honiara

== Bracket ==
The bracket was determined as follows:

Semi-finals
20 March 2024
(Papua New Guinea) Hekari United (a.e.t.)	2
(Fiji) Labasa	0
20 March 2024
(New Zealand) Auckland United (a.e.t.)	2
(Vanuatu) Tafea	1

Final
23 March 2024
(Papua New Guinea) Hekari United	0
(New Zealand) Auckland United	1

== Semi-finals ==
Team 1	Score	Team 2
Hekari United (Papua New Guinea)	2–0 (a.e.t.)	(Fiji) Labasa
Auckland United (New Zealand)	2–1 (a.e.t.)	(Vanuatu) Tafea

20 March 2024
11:00

Hekari United (Papua New Guinea)	2–0 (a.e.t.)	(Fiji) Labasa
Elipas 100'; Maneu 114'	Report

National Stadium, Honiara
Attendance: 250
Referee: Shama Maemae (Solomon Islands)

20 March 2024
15:00

Auckland United (New Zealand)	2–1 (a.e.t.)	(Vanuatu) Tafea
Green 10'; Canham 104'	Report	Eramol 82'

National Stadium, Honiara
Attendance: 350
Referee: Kyllian Lelarge (New Caledonia)

== Final ==
In the final, the two semi-final winners played against each other. The final was played on 23 March 2024.

23 March 2024
15:00 UTC+11

Hekari United (Papua New Guinea)	0–1	(New Zealand) Auckland United
	Report	Johnson 25'

National Stadium, Honiara
Attendance: 510
Referee: Torika Delai (Fiji)
