= 2023 OFC Women's Champions League =

Tournament details
- Host country: Papua New Guinea
- Dates: 1–10 June 2023
- Teams: 5 (from 5 associations)

Final positions
- Champions: (New Caledonia) AS Academy (1st title)
- Runners-up: (Papua New Guinea) Hekari United

Tournament statistics
- Matches played: 10
- Goals scored: 44 (4.4 per match)
- Attendance: 18,132 (1,813 per match)
- Top scorer: (Papua New Guinea) Marie Kaipu (9 goals)
- Best player: (New Caledonia) Edsy Matao
- Best goalkeeper: (Solomon Islands) Sylvester Maenu’u
- Fair play award: (Papua New Guinea) Hekari United

The 2023 OFC Champions League was the inaugural edition of the OFC Women's Champions League, Oceania's premier women's club football tournament organized by the Oceania Football Confederation (OFC).

AS Academy won the first ever edition of the tournament after winning all four of their matches.

== Teams ==
A total of 6 teams from 6 (out of 11) OFC member associations entered the competition.

Location of teams of the 2023 OFC Women's Champions League

Association	Team	Qualifying method
Teams entering the group stage
Fiji	Labasa	2022 Fiji Women's Super League champions
New Caledonia	AS Academy	2022 National Championship champions
~~(New Zealand) New Zealand~~	~~Eastern Suburbs~~	~~2022 New Zealand Women's National League grand final champions~~
(Papua New Guinea) Papua New Guinea	Hekari United	2021–22 Papua New Guinea Women's National Soccer League champions
Samoa	Kiwi	2022 FFS Women's National League champions
(Solomon Islands) Solomon Islands	Koloale	2022 Women's Premier League champions

Associations that did not enter a team

- American Samoa
- Cook Islands
- New Zealand (W)
- Tahiti
- Tonga
- Vanuatu

Notes

- (W): Withdrew after draw.

== Group stage ==
Originally, the six teams were to be split into two groups of three with the two group winners advancing to the final. Eastern Suburbs withdrew after the draw, citing concerns about costs, timing and security. The five remaining teams played each other on a round-robin basis at a centralised venue in Papua New Guinea.

The draw of the original group stage was announced by the OFC on 4 May 2023. The 6 teams were drawn into two groups of three.

All times were local, PGT (UTC+10).

Pos	Team	Pld	W	D	L	GF	GA	GD	Pts	ASA	HEK	KOL	LAB	KIW
1	(New Caledonia) AS Academy (C)	4	4	0	0	15	3	+12	12	—	—	—	4–1	5–0
2	(Papua New Guinea) Hekari United (H)	4	3	0	1	17	2	+15	9	1–2	—	—	2–0	—
3	(Solomon Islands) Koloale	4	2	0	2	4	10	−6	6	1–4	0–5	—	—	—
4	(Fiji) Labasa	4	1	0	3	7	7	0	3	—	—	0–1	—	6–0
5	(Samoa) Kiwi	4	0	0	4	1	22	−21	0	—	0–9	1–2	—	—

Source: OFC
(C) Champions; (H) Hosts
1 June 2023
12:00

Labasa (Fiji)	6–0	(Samoa) Kiwi
Diyalowai 8'; Naivalulevu 25', 45+3'; Vulitikoro 90'; Tuberi 82', 90+2' (pen.)	Report

Sir Hubert Murray Stadium, Port Moresby
Attendance: 1,232
Referee: Shama Maemae (Solomon Islands)
1 June 2023
17:00

Hekari United (Papua New Guinea)	1–2	(New Caledonia) AS Academy
Kaipu 81' (pen.)	Report	Leme 2'; Gowet 90+10'

Sir Hubert Murray Stadium, Port Moresby
Attendance: 874
Referee: Beth Rattray (New Zealand)

3 June 2023
12:00

Labasa (Fiji)	0–1	(Solomon Islands) Koloale
	Report	Pegi 90'

Sir Hubert Murray Stadium, Port Moresby
Attendance: 1,921
Referee: Pari Oito (Tahiti)
3 June 2023
17:00

Kiwi (Samoa)	0–9	(Papua New Guinea) Hekari United
	Report	Padio 15'; Waida 35'; Kaipu 42', 65', 76', 79'; Elipas 48', 69'; Singara 74'

Sir Hubert Murray Stadium, Port Moresby
Attendance: 1,921
Referee: Torika Delai (Fiji)

5 June 2023
12:00

Kiwi (Samoa)	1–2	(Solomon Islands) Koloale
Kalifa 56'	Report	Joe 73'; Kairi 84'

Sir Hubert Murray Stadium, Port Moresby
Attendance: 1,100
Referee: Tellos Kaufusi (Tonga)
5 June 2023
17:00

AS Academy (New Caledonia)	4–1	(Fiji) Labasa
Wahnawe 34', 65', 67'; Wenessia 47'	Report	Tuberi 75'

Sir Hubert Murray Stadium, Port Moresby
Attendance: 1,100
Referee: Beth Rattray (New Zealand)

8 June 2023
12:00

AS Academy (New Caledonia)	5–0	(Samoa) Kiwi
Leme 2', 40'; Wahnawe 17', 29'; Wenessia 82'	Report

Sir Hubert Murray Stadium, Port Moresby
Attendance: 2,325
Referee: Tellos Kaufusi (Tonga)
8 June 2023
17:00

Koloale (Solomon Islands)	0–5	(Papua New Guinea) Hekari United
	Report	Kaipu 40', 64' (pen.); Butubu 48'; Padio 72'; Maneo 90'

Sir Hubert Murray Stadium, Port Moresby
Attendance: 2,325
Referee: Torika Delai (Fiji)

10 June 2023
12:00

Koloale (Solomon Islands)	1–4	(New Caledonia) AS Academy
Pegi 38'	Report	Wahnawe 40'; Wenessia 55', 84'; Luepak 59'

Sir Hubert Murray Stadium, Port Moresby
Attendance: 2,667
Referee: Beth Rattray (New Zealand)
10 June 2023
17:00

Hekari United (Papua New Guinea)	2–0	(Fiji) Labasa
Kaipu 12', 28'	Report

Sir Hubert Murray Stadium, Port Moresby
Attendance: 2,667
Referee: Shama Maemae (Solomon Islands)

== Statistics ==
=== Top goalscorers ===
Rank	Player	Team	Goals
1	(Papua New Guinea) Marie Kaipu	(Papua New Guinea) Hekari United	9
2	(New Caledonia) Christelle Wahnawe	(New Caledonia) AS Academy	6
3	(New Caledonia) Alice Wenessia	(New Caledonia) AS Academy	4
4	(Fiji) Unaisi Tuberi	(Fiji) Labasa	3
5	(Papua New Guinea) Nenny Elipas	(Papua New Guinea) Hekari United	2
5	(Fiji) Stella Naivalulevu	(Fiji) Labasa	2
7	12 players		1

== Awards ==
The following awards were given at the conclusion of the tournament.

Award	Player	Team
Golden Ball	(New Caledonia) Edsy Matao	(New Caledonia) AS Academy
Golden Boot	(Papua New Guinea) Marie Kaipu	(Papua New Guinea) Hekari United
Golden Glove	(Solomon Islands) Sylvester Maenu’u	(Solomon Islands) Koloale
Fair Play Award	—	(Papua New Guinea) Hekari United

== See also ==
- 2023 AFC Women's Club Championship
- 2023 CAF Women's Champions League
- 2023 Copa Libertadores Femenina
- 2022–23 and 2023–24 UEFA Women's Champions League
- 2023 OFC Champions League
