= 2025 OFC Women's Champions League =

Tournament details
- Host country: Tahiti
- Dates: 4–17 May 2025
- Teams: 7 (from 7 associations)

Final positions
- Champions: (New Zealand) Auckland United (2nd title)
- Runners-up: (Papua New Guinea) Hekari Women's

Tournament statistics
- Matches played: 12
- Goals scored: 71 (5.92 per match)
- Top scorer(s): (New Zealand) Zoe Benson; 8 goals
- Best player: (New Zealand) Saskia Vosper
- Best goalkeeper: (New Zealand) Hannah Mitchell
- Fair play award: (French Polynesia) Pirae

The 2025 OFC Champions League was the third edition of the OFC Women's Champions League, Oceania's premier women's club football tournament organized by the Oceania Football Confederation (OFC). It was played from 4 to 17 May in Tahiti. Auckland United qualified for the inaugural FIFA Women's Champions Cup to be held in 2026.

== Teams ==
Location of teams of the 2025 OFC Champions League

A total of seven teams out of the eleven OFC member associations entered the competition. The draw was held on 19 March 2025 at OFC Home of Football in Auckland, New Zealand.

| Association | Team | Qualifying method |
|---|---|---|
| American Samoa | PanSa | 2024 FFAS Senior Women's League champions |
| Cook Islands | Tupapa Maraerenga | 2024 Rarotonga Club Championship champions |
| Fiji | Ba Women | 2024 Fiji Women's Super League champions |
| New Zealand | Auckland United | 2024 New Zealand Women's National League grand final champions |
| Papua New Guinea | Hekari Women's | 2023–24 Papua New Guinea Women's National Soccer League champions |
| Solomon Islands | Henderson Eels | 2024 Women's Premier League champions |
| Tahiti | Pirae | 2024 Tahiti Women's Major League champions |
| ~~Vanuatu~~ | ~~Penama Tigers~~ (Note: Penama Tigers withdrew before the start of the tournament.) | ~~2024 Vanuatu Women's Champion League champions~~ |

Associations that did not enter a team:

- New Caledonia
- Samoa
- Tonga
- Vanuatu (W)

Notes

- (W): Withdrew after draw.

== Group stage ==
The group stage matches were scheduled to take place in Tahiti, and was played from 4 to 17 May 2025.

All times are local, TAHT (UTC-10).

=== Group A ===
| Pos | Team | Pld | W | D | L | GF | GA | GD | Pts | Qualification | BAW | HEN | TUP | PEN |
|---|---|---|---|---|---|---|---|---|---|---|---|---|---|---|
| 1 | (Fiji) Ba Women's | 2 | 2 | 0 | 0 | 5 | 1 | +4 | 6 | Advance to semi-finals | — | 2–0 | — | — |
| 2 | (Solomon Islands) Henderson Eels | 2 | 1 | 0 | 1 | 5 | 2 | +3 | 3 | Advance to semi-finals | — | — | 5–0 | — |
| 3 | (Cook Islands) Tupapa Maraerenga | 2 | 0 | 0 | 2 | 1 | 8 | −7 | 0 | | 1–3 | — | — | — |
| 4 | (Vanuatu) Penama Tigers | 0 | 0 | 0 | 0 | 0 | 0 | 0 | 0 | Withdrew (Note: Penama Tigers withdrew before the start of the tournament.) | — | — | — | — |

Source: OFC
Notes:
4 May 2025
12:00 (UTC-10:00)

| Henderson Eels (Solomon Islands) | 5–0 | (Cook Islands) Tupapa Maraerenga |
|---|---|---|
| Pegi 27'; Arukau 36', 40', 60'; Gitoli 90+9' | Report |

Stade Fautaua, Papeete
Attendance: 200
Referee: Sarah Jones (New Zealand)

7 May 2025
12:00 (UTC-10:00)

| Ba Women's (Fiji) | 2–0 | (Solomon Islands) Henderson Eels |
|---|---|---|
| Likuculacula 65'; Naio 68' | Report |

Stade Fautaua, Papeete
Attendance: 200
Referee: Beth Rattray (New Zealand)

10 May 2025
12:00 (UTC-10:00)

| Tupapa Maraerenga (Cook Islands) | 1–3 | (Fiji) Ba Women's |
|---|---|---|
| Kermode 79' | Report | Likuculacula 4', 23'; Rasovasova 22' |

Stade Fautaua, Papeete
Attendance: 200
Referee: Anna-Marie Keighley (New Zealand)

=== Group B ===
| Pos | Team | Pld | W | D | L | GF | GA | GD | Pts | Qualification | AUC | HEK | PIR | PAN |
|---|---|---|---|---|---|---|---|---|---|---|---|---|---|---|
| 1 | (New Zealand) Auckland United | 3 | 3 | 0 | 0 | 24 | 1 | +23 | 9 | Advance to semi-finals | — | — | — | 11–0 |
| 2 | (Papua New Guinea) Hekari Women's | 3 | 2 | 0 | 1 | 15 | 2 | +13 | 6 | Advance to semi-finals | 1–2 | — | 2–0 | — |
| 3 | (French Polynesia) Pirae (H) | 3 | 1 | 0 | 2 | 6 | 13 | −7 | 3 | | 0–11 | — | — | 6–0 |
| 4 | (American Samoa) PanSa | 3 | 0 | 0 | 3 | 0 | 29 | −29 | 0 | | — | 0–12 | — | — |

Source: OFC
(H) Hosts
5 May 2025
12:00 (UTC-10:00)

| PanSa (American Samoa) | 0–12 | (Papua New Guinea) Hekari Women's |
|---|---|---|
| | Report | Padio 4', 66', 75'; Kaipu 16', 18', 25', 27', 90'; Maneo 21'; Butubu 45'; Bakaniceva 60'; Elipas 63' |

Stade Pater, Pirae
Attendance: 200
Referee: Shama Maemae (Solomon Islands)
5 May 2025
15:00 (UTC-10:00)

| Pirae (French Polynesia) | 0–11 | (New Zealand) Auckland United |
|---|---|---|
| | Report | Benson 6', 8', 19', 42', 45'; Canham 10', 38'; Pritchard 45'; Dugan 74', 90'; Roche 90+6' |

Stade Pater, Pirae
Attendance: 250
Referee: Anahí Fernández (Uruguay)

8 May 2025
12:00 (UTC-10:00)

| Hekari Women's (Papua New Guinea) | 1–2 | (New Zealand) Auckland United |
|---|---|---|
| Waida 90' | Report | Granger 42'; Pritchard 55' |

Stade Pater, Pirae
Attendance: 200
Referee: Anahí Fernández (Uruguay)
8 May 2025
15:00 (UTC-10:00)

| Pirae (French Polynesia) | 6–0 | (American Samoa) PanSa |
|---|---|---|
| Tamarii 9', 25', 79'; Vivish 36'; Rua 42' (pen.); Warren 47' | Report |

Stade Pater, Pirae
Attendance: 500
Referee: Torika Delai (Fiji)

11 May 2025
12:00 (UTC-10:00)

| Auckland United (New Zealand) | 11–0 | (American Samoa) PanSa |
|---|---|---|
| Knott 6', 21', 30'; Pritchard 19' (pen.); Philpot 23'; A. Vosper 40'; Vlok 51', 85', 90+2'; S. Vosper 81'; McConnell 89' | Report |

Stade Pater, Pirae
Attendance: 200
Referee: Jovita Ambrose (Solomon Islands)
11 May 2025
15:00 (UTC-10:00)

| Hekari Women's (Papua New Guinea) | 2–0 | (French Polynesia) Pirae |
|---|---|---|
| Butubu 39'; Waida 45+3' | Report |

Stade Pater, Pirae
Attendance: 300
Referee: Torika Delai (Fiji)

== Knockout stage ==
=== Bracket ===
The bracket was determined as follows:

Semi-finals
14 May 2025
(Fiji) Ba Women | 1
(Papua New Guinea) Hekari Women's | 6
14 May 2025
(New Zealand) Auckland United | 6
(Solomon Islands) Henderson Eels | 1

Final
17 May 2025
(Papua New Guinea) Hekari Women | 0
(New Zealand) Auckland United | 1

=== Semi-finals ===
14 May 2025
11:00

| Ba Women (Fiji) | 1–6 | (Papua New Guinea) Hekari Women's |
|---|---|---|
| Tamanitoakula 44' (pen.) | Report | Elipas 5', 54', 58'; Kaipu 52', 69'; Pala 85' (pen.) |

Stade Pater, Pirae
Attendance: 200
Referee: Anna-Marie Keighley (New Zealand)

14 May 2025
15:00

| Auckland United (New Zealand) | 6–1 | (Solomon Islands) Henderson Eels |
|---|---|---|
| Dugan 3'; Benson 5', 18', 28'; Pritchard 7'; Canham 47' | Report | Pegi 26' |

Stade Pater, Pirae
Attendance: 200
Referee: Anahí Fernández (Uruguay)

=== Final ===
The final was played on 17 May 2025.

17 May 2025
14:00 UTC−10

| Hekari United (Papua New Guinea) | 0–1 | (New Zealand) Auckland United |
|---|---|---|
| | Report | Canham 26' |

Stade Pater, Pirae
Attendance: 300
Referee: Anahí Fernández (Uruguay)

== Awards ==
The following awards were given at the conclusion of the tournament.

| Award | Player | Team |
|---|---|---|
| Golden Ball | (New Zealand) Saskia Vosper | (New Zealand) Auckland United |
| Golden Boot | (New Zealand) Zoe Benson | (New Zealand) Auckland United |
| Golden Glove | (New Zealand) Hannah Mitchell | (New Zealand) Auckland United |
| Fair Play Award | —N/a | (French Polynesia) Pirae |

== See also ==
- 2025 OFC Champions League
