= 2026 OFC Women's Champions League =

Tournament details
- Host country: Tahiti
- Dates: 26 June - 9 July 2026
- Teams: 7 (from 7 associations)

Final positions
- Champions: (New Zealand) Auckland United (3rd title)
- Runners-up: (Papua New Guinea) Hekari Women's

Tournament statistics
- Matches played: 12
- Goals scored: 68 (5.67 per match)

The 2026 OFC Champions League was the fourth edition of the OFC Women's Champions League, Oceania's premier women's club football tournament organized by the Oceania Football Confederation (OFC). It was played from 26 June to 9 July in Solomon Islands. Auckland United qualified for the second edition of the FIFA Women's Champions Cup to be held in 2027.

== Teams ==
A total of ten teams out of the eleven OFC member associations entered the competition. In this edition, a Preliminary Phase will be played with three teams to define the last classified for the Group Phase. The draw was held on 19 March 2025 at OFC Home of Football in Auckland, New Zealand.

Qualified teams for 2026 OFC Women's Champions League
Entry round	Teams		
Group stage	Fiji	Ba Women	2025 Fiji Women's Super League champions
Group stage	New Zealand	Auckland United	2025 New Zealand Women's National League grand final champions
Group stage	Papua New Guinea	Hekari Women's	2024–25 Papua New Guinea Women's National Soccer League champions
Group stage	Solomon Islands	Henderson Eels	2025 Women's Premier League champions
Group stage	New Caledonia	Drehu Athletico Club	2025 National Championship
Group stage	Vanuatu	Tafea FC	2025 Vanuatu Women's Champion League
Qualifying stage	Cook Islands	Puaikura FC	2025 Rarotonga Club Championship champions
Qualifying stage	Tonga	Nukuhetulu FC	2025 Tonga Women's Major League champions
Qualifying stage	American Samoa	PanSa	2025 FFAS Senior Women's League champions

Associations that did not enter a team:

- Samoa
- Tahiti

== Schedule ==
Schedule for 2026 OFC Women's Champions League
Phase	Round	Draw date	First leg	Second leg
Qualifying stage	Preliminary group (Cook Islands)	23 March 2026	21 April	
Qualifying stage	Preliminary group (Cook Islands)	23 March 2026	24 April	
Qualifying stage	Preliminary group (Cook Islands)	23 March 2026	27 April	
Group stage	Matchday 1	23 March 2026	26–27 June	
Group stage	Matchday 2	23 March 2026	29–30 June	
Group stage	Matchday 3	23 March 2026	2–3 July	
Knockout phase	Semi-finals	23 March 2026	6 July	
Knockout phase	Final	23 March 2026	9 July	

== Qualifying stage ==
Pos	Team	Pld	W	D	L	GF	GA	GD	Pts	Qualification
1	(Cook Islands) Puaikura (H)	2	2	0	0	5	0	+5	6	Advance to group stage
2	(Tonga) Nukuhetulu	2	1	0	1	5	2	+3	3	
3	(American Samoa) PanSa	2	0	0	2	0	8	−8	0	

Source: OFC
(H) Hosts
21 April 2026
14:00

Puaikura FC (Cook Islands)	2–0	(Tonga) Nukuhetulu FC
Rouru 30'; Savage 54' (pen.)	(OFC) (Report)

CIFA Academy Field, Matavera, Cook Islands
Attendance: 150
Referee: Torika Delai (Fiji)
24 April 2026
14:00

Puaikura FC (Cook Islands)	3–0	(American Samoa) PanSa
Katuke 26'; Fatiaki 45'; Kermode 79'	(OFC) (Report)

CIFA Academy Field, Matavera, Cook Islands
Attendance: 150
Referee: Beth Rattray (New Zealand)
27 April 2026
14:00

Nukuhetulu FC (Tonga)	5–0	(American Samoa) PanSa
Tonga 23'; Moala 27'; Fotu 53' (pen.), 90+5'; Taulama 63'	(OFC) (Report)

CIFA Academy Field, Matavera, Cook Islands
Attendance: 100
Referee: Shama Maemae (Solomon Islands)

== Group stage ==
=== Group A ===
Pos	Team	Pld	W	D	L	GF	GA	GD	Pts	Qualification
1	(Papua New Guinea) Hekari Women's	3	2	1	0	14	4	+10	7	Advance to knockout stage
2	(Vanuatu) Tafea	3	2	1	0	12	5	+7	7	Advance to knockout stage
3	(Fiji) Ba Women's	3	1	0	2	10	7	+3	3	
4	(Solomon Islands) Henderson Eels (H)	3	0	0	3	1	21	−20	0	

First match(es) will be played: unknown. Source:
(H) Hosts
28 June 2026
16:00

Hekari Women's (Papua New Guinea)	2–2	(Vanuatu) Tafea
	(OFC)

National Stadium, Honiara, Solomon Islands
Attendance: 387
28 June 2026
19:00

Ba Women's (Fiji)	6–0	(Solomon Islands) Henderson Eels
	(OFC)

National Stadium, Honiara, Solomon Islands
Attendance: 405
1 July 2026
16:00

Hekari Women's (Papua New Guinea)	3–1	(Fiji) Ba Women's
	(OFC)

National Stadium, Honiara, Solomon Islands
Attendance: 147
1 July 2026
19:00

Henderson Eels (Solomon Islands)	0–6	(Vanuatu) Tafea
	(OFC)

National Stadium, Honiara, Solomon Islands
Attendance: 302
4 July 2026
16:00

Tafea (Vanuatu)	4–3	(Fiji) Ba Women's
	(OFC)

National Stadium, Honiara, Solomon Islands
Attendance: 125
4 July 2026
19:00

Henderson Eels (Solomon Islands)	1–9	(Papua New Guinea) Hekari Women's
	(OFC)

National Stadium, Honiara, Solomon Islands
Attendance: 175

=== Group B ===
Pos	Team	Pld	W	D	L	GF	GA	GD	Pts	Qualification
1	(New Zealand) Auckland United	2	2	0	0	18	1	+17	6	Advance to knockout stage
2	(Cook Islands) Puaikura	2	0	1	1	2	9	−7	1	Advance to knockout stage
3	(New Caledonia) Drehu Athletico Club	2	0	1	1	3	13	−10	1	

First match(es) will be played: unknown. Source:
27 June 2026
19:00

Auckland United (New Zealand)	11–1	(New Caledonia) Drehu Athletico Club
	(OFC)

National Stadium, Honiara, Solomon Islands
Attendance: 357
30 June 2026
19:00

Auckland United (New Zealand)	7–0	(Cook Islands) Puaikura
	(OFC)

National Stadium, Honiara, Solomon Islands
Attendance: 156
3 July 2026
19:00

Drehu Athletico Club (New Caledonia)	2–2	(Cook Islands) Puaikura
	(OFC)

National Stadium, Honiara, Solomon Islands
Attendance: 53

== Knockout stage ==
=== Semi-finals ===
7 July 2026
16:30

Hekari Women's (Papua New Guinea)	1−0	(Cook Islands) Puaikura FC
Elipas 86'	(OFC) (Report)

National Stadium, Honiara, Solomon Islands
Attendance: 267
Referee: Sarah Jones (New Zealand)

7 July 2026
20:00

Auckland United (New Zealand)	2−1	(Vanuatu) Tafea FC
March 48'; Ingham 55'	(OFC) (Report)	Kalsau 87'

National Stadium, Honiara, Solomon Islands
Attendance: 292
Referee: Kyllian Lelarge (New Caledonia)

=== Final ===
10 July 2026
18:00

Hekari Women's (Papua New Guinea)	1−3	(New Zealand) Auckland United
Elipas 18'	(OFC) (Report)	Granger 4'; Adamson 45+3'; Jensen 87'

National Stadium, Honiara, Solomon Islands
Attendance: 717
Referee: Torika Delai (Fiji)
