= 2024 New Zealand Women's National League =

Football Championship

New Zealand National League
- Season: 2024
- Dates: 22 March 2024 – 1 December 2024
- Champions: Auckland United
- OFC Women's Champions League: Auckland United
- Matches: 46
- Goals: 174 (3.78 per match)
- Top goalscorer: Charlotte Roche (10 goals)
- Biggest home win: Western Springs 6–0 Central Football (9 November 2024); CF Wellington United 6–0 Central Football (24 November 2024)
- Biggest away win: Central Football 0–10 Eastern Suburbs (26 October 2024)
- Highest scoring: Central Football 0–10 Eastern Suburbs (26 October 2024)
- Longest winning run: 8 matches Auckland United
- Longest unbeaten run: 9 matches Auckland United
- Longest winless run: 9 matches Central Football
- Longest losing run: 9 matches Central Football

The 2024 New Zealand Women's National League is the fourth scheduled season of the new National League since its restructuring in 2021; the 2021 National League was cancelled due to the COVID-19 pandemic in northern regions. The 2024 season will be the twenty-second season of national women's football and will again be a hybrid season. The competition will feature four teams from the NRFL Premiership representing the Northern Conference, Central Football and two Capital Football federation sides representing the Central Conference, and Canterbury United Pride and Southern United representing the Southern Conference.

== Qualifying league ==
=== 2024 NRFL Premiership ===
NRFL Premiership
- Season: 2024
- Dates: 22 March 2024 – 1 September 2024
- Champions: Auckland United
- Relegated: Hamilton Wanderers

Eight teams are competing in the league – the top seven teams from the previous season and the promoted side from the 2023 NRFL Championship. The promoted team is Fencibles United as winners of the 2023 NRFL Championship. They replaced Northern Rovers.

==== Teams ====
Team	Location	Home Ground	2023 season
Auckland United	Mount Roskill, Auckland	Keith Hay Park	1st
Eastern Suburbs	Kohimarama, Auckland	Madills Farm	2nd
Ellerslie	Ellerslie, Auckland	Michaels Avenue Reserve	4th
Fencibles United	Pakuranga, Auckland	Riverhills Domain	1st in NRFL Women's Championship (promoted)
Hamilton Wanderers	Chartwell, Hamilton	Porritt Stadium	6th
Hibiscus Coast	Whangaparāoa, Auckland	Stanmore Bay Park	7th
West Coast Rangers	Whenuapai, Auckland	Fred Taylor Park	5th
Western Springs	Westmere, Auckland	Seddon Fields	3rd

==== NRFL Premiership table ====
Pos	Team	Pld	W	D	L	GF	GA	GD	Pts	Qualification
1	Auckland United (C)	21	19	2	0	65	9	+56	59	Winner of NRFL Premiership and qualification to National League Championship
2	West Coast Rangers	21	16	1	4	65	29	+36	49	Qualification to National League Championship
3	Eastern Suburbs	21	10	1	10	39	29	+10	31	Qualification to National League Championship
4	Western Springs	21	9	3	9	38	31	+7	30	Qualification to National League Championship
5	Fencibles United	21	8	2	11	26	41	−15	26	
6	Hibiscus Coast	21	7	3	11	30	44	−14	24	
7	Ellerslie	21	4	4	13	21	48	−27	16	
8	Hamilton Wanderers (R)	21	2	2	17	14	67	−53	8	Relegation to NRFL Women's Championship

Source: Northern Region Football
Rules for classification: 1) Points; 2) Goal difference; 3) Goals scored; 4) Goals against; 5) Head to head; 6) Disciplinary record; 7) Coin toss
(C) Champions; (R) Relegated

==== NRFL Premiership results table ====
Home \ Away	AKU	EAS	ELL	FEN	HAM	HBC	WCR	WSP	AKU	EAS	ELL	FEN	HAM	HBC	WCR	WSP
Auckland United		2–2	4–1	2–0	5–0	6–0	3–1	1–0		1–0			3–0	5–1	4–1	
Eastern Suburbs	1–6		1–2	1–0	0–1	5–1	2–4	2–1			3–1			0–3		1–2
Ellerslie	0–4	0–4		1–1	4–3	0–0	3–4	2–4	0–2				3–0			0–2
Fencibles United	1–3	0–6	1–0		3–1	3–1	0–3	2–1	1–1	0–3	2–1					2–3
Hamilton Wanderers	0–6	1–5	1–1	0–3		0–5	0–4	2–2		0–1		0–2		1–3	0–5	
Hibiscus Coast	0–2	1–0	0–0	1–2	3–0		1–3	4–2			0–1	2–1			0–3	
West Coast Rangers	0–3	2–1	5–1	4–0	3–2	3–2		3–1		0–1	6–0	5–2				2–2
Western Springs	0–1	1–0	1–0	2–0	5–0	2–2	1–4		0–1				1–2	5–0		

Source: Northern Region Football
Legend: Blue = home team win; Yellow = draw; Red = away team win.

== Qualified teams ==
Locations of the 2024 Women's National League Teams
Location of clubs in Auckland Region for the 2024 Women's National League season

Association	Team	Position in Regional League	App (last)	Previous best (last)
Northern League (4 berths)	Auckland United	1st	3rd (2023)	1st (2023)
Northern League (4 berths)	West Coast Rangers	2nd	1st	Debut
Northern League (4 berths)	Eastern Suburbs	3rd	3rd (2023)	1st (2022)
Northern League (4 berths)	Western Springs	4th	3rd (2023)	2nd (2022)
Central League (3 berths)	Central Football	N/A	22nd (2023)	2nd (2004)
Central League (3 berths)	CF Waterside Karori	N/A	2nd (2023)	5th (2023)
Central League (3 berths)	CF Wellington United	N/A	2nd (2023)	6th (2023)
Southern League (2 berths)	Canterbury United Pride	N/A	22nd (2023)	1st (2020)
Southern League (2 berths)	Southern United	N/A	22nd (2023)	1st (2021)
Wellington Phoenix (automatic berth)	Wellington Phoenix Reserves	Automatic qualification	2nd (2023)	8th (2023)

== Championship phase ==
=== League table ===
Pos	Team	Pld	W	D	L	GF	GA	GD	Pts	Qualification
1	Auckland United (C)	9	8	1	0	21	4	+17	25	Qualification to Grand Final and Women's Champions League group stage
2	CF Waterside Karori	9	5	3	1	18	8	+10	18	Qualification to Grand Final
3	Eastern Suburbs	9	4	2	3	24	9	+15	14	
4	Western Springs	9	4	2	3	22	13	+9	14	
5	West Coast Rangers	9	4	2	3	20	15	+5	14	
6	CF Wellington United	9	3	4	2	19	11	+8	13	
7	Canterbury United Pride	9	4	1	4	17	20	−3	13	
8	Southern United	9	3	2	4	17	12	+5	11	
9	Wellington Phoenix Reserves (Note: Wellington Phoenix Reserves can not qualify for the Grand Final.)	9	1	1	7	9	28	−19	4	
10	Central Football	9	0	0	9	3	50	−47	0	

Source: New Zealand Football
Rules for classification: 1) Points; 2) Goal difference; 3) Goals for; 4) Head to head; 5) Disciplinary record; 6) Coin toss
(C) Champions

=== Results table ===
Home \ Away	AKU	CUP	CEN	CWK	CWU	EAS	SOU	WPX	WCR	WSP
Auckland United					2–0	2–0	2–1	3–0		1–0
Canterbury United Pride	1–4					1–3		4–1	4–3	0–3
Central Football	1–5	1–2				0–10			0–5	
CF Waterside Karori	1–1	3–2	3–0						3–1	
CF Wellington United		1–1	6–0	1–1			1–2	4–0		
Eastern Suburbs				0–1	2–2		0–0			3–1
Southern United		1–2	8–1	2–0				1–1	1–3	
Wellington Phoenix Reserves			5–0	0–5		0–5				1–4
West Coast Rangers	0–1				1–1	2–1		2–1		3–3
Western Springs			6–0	1–1	2–3		2–1			

Source: New Zealand Football
Legend: Blue = home team win; Yellow = draw; Red = away team win.

==== Positions by round ====
The table lists the positions of teams after each week of matches. To preserve chronological evolvements, any postponed matches are not included in the round at which they were originally scheduled, but added to the full round they were played immediately afterwards. For example, if a match is scheduled for round 3, but then postponed and played between rounds 6 and 7, it is added to the standings for round 6.

Team ╲ Round	1	2	3	4	5	6	7	8	9
Auckland United	4	4	1	2	1	1	1	1	1
CF Waterside Karori	4	2	2	1	2	2	2	2	2
Eastern Suburbs	6	8	8	6	6	4	3	3	3
Western Springs	8	7	6	7	8	8	8	5	4
West Coast Rangers	1	1	5	5	4	3	4	6	5
CF Wellington United	3	5	3	4	5	6	6	7	6
Canterbury United Pride	2	3	4	3	3	5	5	4	7
Southern United	6	6	7	8	7	7	7	8	8
Wellington Phoenix Reserves	9	10	10	10	9	9	9	9	9
Central Football	10	9	9	9	10	10	10	10	10

Leader and Grand Final
Grand Final

Source: New Zealand Football

=== Grand Final ===
Sunday, 1 December 2024
13:00 NZDT

Auckland United	3–1	CF Waterside Karori
Vlok 2'; Roche 12', 52'	Report	Furukawa 53'

North Harbour Stadium, Auckland
Referee: Beth Rattray

== Awards ==
=== Annual awards ===
Team of the season
Goalkeeper	Nikki Whyte (Eastern Suburbs)			
Defenders	Zoe Barrott (CF Wellington United)		Sarah Morton (CF Waterside Karori)	Saskia Vosper (Auckland United)
Midfielders	Rina Hirano (Western Springs)	Emma Starr (CF Waterside Karori)	Kate Loye (Canterbury United Pride)	Shontelle Smith (Southern United)
Forwards	Kendall Pollock (CF Waterside Karori)		Charlotte Roche (Auckland United)	Britney Cunningham-Lee (Eastern Suburbs)

== See also ==
- 2024 New Zealand National League (men's)
