= OFC Women's Champions League =

Association football tournament for women's clubs in Oceania

- Organiser(s): OFC
- Founded: 2023; 3 years ago
- Region: Oceania
- Teams: 8 (from 8 associations)
- Qualifier for: FIFA Women's Club World Cup (proposed); FIFA Women's Champions Cup
- Current champions: (New Zealand) Auckland United (3rd title)
- Most championships: (New Zealand) Auckland United (3 titles)
- Broadcaster: FIFA+
- Website: Official website
- 2026 OFC Women's Champions League

The OFC Women's Champions League is the top-tier women's football club competition in Oceania. It involves the top clubs from countries affiliated with the Oceania Football Confederation (OFC).

The first edition was played in June 2023. AS Academy won that edition of the tournament after winning all four of their matches.

== History ==
=== Inaugural edition ===
The first edition was planned for March 2023, but was then postponed to 1 to 10 June.

The tournament was played in Papua New Guinea and was supposed to feature six teams from the region, but New Zealand's Eastern Suburbs subsequently withdrew after the draw due to financial, logistical and security concerns.

The five remaining teams played each other on a round-robin basis.

=== Subsequent editions ===
The 2024 edition was played in the Solomon Islands and now featured eight teams in two groups followed by a knock-out stage.

Tahiti hosted the 2025 edition from 4 to 17 May with previous champions Auckland United defending their title.

== Results ==
Performance in Oceania Club Championship and OFC Champions League
Season	Winners	Score	Runners-up	Venue	Attendance
2023	(New Caledonia) AS Academy	— (Note: No final - round-robin format)	(Papua New Guinea) Hekari United	Round-robin format	
2024	(New Zealand) Auckland United	1–0	(Papua New Guinea) Hekari United	National Stadium, Honiara, Solomon Islands	510
2025	(New Zealand) Auckland United	1–0	(Papua New Guinea) Hekari United	Stade Pater, Pirae, Tahiti	300
2026	(New Zealand) Auckland United	3–1	(Papua New Guinea) Hekari United	National Stadium, Honiara, Solomon Islands	

== Performances ==
=== Performances by club ===
Performances in the OFC Women's Champions League by club
Club	Titles	Runners-up	Years won	Years runners-up
(New Zealand) Auckland United	3	0	2024, 2025, 2026	—
(New Caledonia) AS Academy	1	0	2023	—
(Papua New Guinea) Hekari United	0	4	—	2023, 2024, 2025, 2026

=== Performances by country ===
Performances by nation
Country	Titles	Runners-up	Years won	Years runners-up
New Zealand	3	0	2024, 2025, 2026	—
New Caledonia	1	0	2023	—
Papua New Guinea	0	4	—	2023, 2024, 2025, 2026

== See also ==
- FIFA Women's Club World Cup / FIFA Women's Champions Cup
  - AFC Women's Champions League
  - CAF Women's Champions League
  - CONCACAF W Champions Cup
  - Copa Libertadores Femenina
  - UEFA Women's Champions League
