= Anahí Fernández =

Uruguayan football referee (born 1993)

- Born: 28 July 1993 (age 33); Uruguay

Domestic
Years	League	Role

International
Years	League	Role
2020–	FIFA-listed	Referee

Anahí Fernández (born 28 July 1993) is a Uruguayan football referee. She has officiated at the international level under the auspices of FIFA and CONMEBOL and was selected as one of the officials for the 2023 FIFA Women's World Cup in Australia and New Zealand.

Fernández began her refereeing career in Uruguay and steadily rose through the ranks of domestic and regional football. She was listed as an international referee by FIFA, allowing her to officiate in international tournaments.

She gained experience in a number of CONMEBOL and FIFA competitions, including matches in the Copa Libertadores Femenina and international friendlies. She has overseen numerous international fixtures across various competitions, including youth and senior level matches for both men’s and women’s teams.

In 2023, Fernández was selected to officiate at the FIFA Women’s World Cup in Australia and New Zealand. She was one of the few South American referees included in the tournament's officiating pool, a distinction noted in media coverage of her appointment. Though she served primarily in supporting roles during the group stage, her participation represented a milestone for Uruguayan refereeing on the global stage.

Fernández has also officiated in South American women's competitions, including World Cup qualifying matches and continental tournaments.
