= AS Academy Féminine =

New Caledonian football club

- Full name: Association sportive Academy féminine
- Short name: ASAF
- Founded: 2017
- Ground: Complexe Sportif de Montravel, Nouméa
- Capacity: 1,000
- Head Coach: Coralie Brétégnier
- League: Division 1 Féminine
- 2023: Division 1 Féminine, 1st of 6 (champions)
- Website: https://as-academy-feminine.footeo.com/

Association sportive Academy féminine (French pronunciation: [asɔsjɑsjɔ̃ spɔʁtiv akademi feminin]), commonly referred as AS Academy Féminine or simply AS Academy (French pronunciation: [ɑ.ɛs akademi]) and often abbreviated to Asaf, is a New Caledonian women's football club based in Montravel in the Nouméa metropolitan area. They compete in the New Caledonian women's national championship, the women's top division of the New Caledonian football league system.

== History ==
AS Academy was created in 2017 by Coralie Brétégnier and Christelle Wahnawe in Montravel and are the only 100% female football organisation in the country. In their first year, the club won the Caledonian Futsal Cup.

In 2019, the club won the Caledonian national championship and beat Païta FC in the Caledonian Cup final on penalties to complete the double for the first time in their history.

In 2021, the season was abandoned due to the COVID-19 pandemic; Nevertheless, ASAF won the South provincial championship.

The club were once again crowned champions of Caledonia in 2022 by winning the league and by defeating Académie fédérale 5–1 in the national cup final.

AS Academy won the first edition of the OFC Women's Champions League in 2023, with four wins in as many matches. They later went on to also win the national championship and the national cup by defeating Académie fédérale 3–0, to complete the first continental treble in their history.

== Honours ==
=== Domestic ===
- New Caledonia National Championship
  - Champions (3): 2019, 2022, 2023
- New Caledonia Cup
  - Winners (4): 2019, 2020, 2022, 2023

=== International ===
- OFC Women's Champions League
  - Winners: 2023
