= Auckland United FC (women) =

Auckland United
- Full name: Auckland United Football Club
- Nickname: Aucks United
- Founded: 2020; 6 years ago
- Ground: Keith Hay Park, Mount Roskill, New Zealand
- President: Dean Cudmore
- Head coach: Alexander Barlow
- League: Women’s National League
- 2026: NRFL Women's Premiership, 1st of 8 Women’s National League, TBD
- Website: aucklandunitedfc.org.nz
Home colours	Away colours

Auckland United Football Club is a professional football club based in the suburb of Mount Roskill in Auckland, New Zealand. It is the women's team of Auckland United. The club competes in the Women’s National League.

The club was founded in 2020 as a merger of Onehunga Sports and Three Kings United.

== Players ==
=== First-team squad ===
As of 6 March 2026

Note: Flags indicate national team as defined under FIFA eligibility rules; some limited exceptions apply. Players may hold more than one non-FIFA nationality.

No.	Pos.	Nation	Player
1	GK	NZL	Charlotte Eagle
2	DF	NZL	Talisha Green (captain)
3	DF	NZL	Jess Philpot
4	DF	NZL	Charley March
5	DF	USA	Halle Johnson
6	MF	JPN	Yume Harashima
7	MF	THA	Nat Olson
8	MF	NZL	Aniela Jensen
9	FW	NZL	Chloe Bellamy
10	FW	NZL	Charlotte Roche
11	FW	ENG	Sasha Adamson
12	DF	NZL	Alaina Granger

No.	Pos.	Nation	Player
13	MF	NZL	Olivia Ingham
14	FW	JPN	Rena Okutsu
15	DF	NZL	Lily Jervis
16	MF	NZL	Stella Lawson
17	MF	NZL	Danica Ulrich-Beech
19	FW	NZL	Shev Edwards
20	MF	NZL	Laura Bennett
21	DF	NZL	Saskia Vosper
22	GK	NZL	Blair Curry
23	MF	NZL	Piper O'Neill
24	DF	NZL	Kara McGillivray

== International record ==
Season	Competition	Round	Opponent	Score	Result
2024	OFC Women's Champions League	Group B	(Fiji) Labasa	1–1	1st out of 4
2024	OFC Women's Champions League	Group B	(New Caledonia) AS Academy	5–0	1st out of 4
2024	OFC Women's Champions League	Group B	(Tonga) Veitongo	1–0	1st out of 4
2024	OFC Women's Champions League	Semi-finals	(Vanuatu) Tafea	2–1 (a.e.t.)	
2024	OFC Women's Champions League	Final	(Papua New Guinea) Hekari United	1–0	
2025	OFC Women's Champions League	Group B	(French Polynesia) Pirae	11–0	1st out of 4
2025	OFC Women's Champions League	Group B	(Papua New Guinea) Hekari United	2–1	1st out of 4
2025	OFC Women's Champions League	Group B	(American Samoa) PanSa	11–0	1st out of 4
2025	OFC Women's Champions League	Semi-finals	(Solomon Islands) Henderson Eels	6–1	
2025	OFC Women's Champions League	Final	(Papua New Guinea) Hekari United	1–0	
2026	FIFA Women's Champions Cup	Round 1	(China) Wuhan Jianghan	0–1	
2026	OFC Women's Champions League	Group B	(New Caledonia) Drehu Athletico Club	11–1	1st out of 3
2026	OFC Women's Champions League	Group B	(Cook Islands) Puaikura	7–0	1st out of 3
2026	OFC Women's Champions League	Semi-finals	(Vanuatu) Tafea	2–1	
2026	OFC Women's Champions League	Final	(Papua New Guinea) Hekari United	3–1	
2027	FIFA Women's Champions Cup	Round 1	(North Korea) Naegohyang	0–2	

== Honours ==
League

- NRFL Women's Premiership
  - Champions (2): 2023, 2024
- New Zealand Women's National League
  - Champions (3): 2023, 2024, 2025

Cup

- Kate Sheppard Cup
  - Winners (3): 2022, 2024, 2025

Continental

- OFC Women's Champions League
  - Winners (3): 2024, 2025, 2026

== See also ==
- Auckland Football Federation

Kate Sheppard Cup
Preceded by Wellington United	Winner; 2022 Kate Sheppard Cup	Succeeded by Western Springs
Preceded by Western Springs	Winner; 2024 Kate Sheppard Cup	Succeeded by Auckland United
Preceded by Auckland United	Winner; 2025 Kate Sheppard Cup	Succeeded by to be played
