= National Stadium (Solomon Islands) =

Sports venue in the Solomon Islands

Solomon Islands National Stadium
- Interactive map of Solomon Islands National Stadium
- Location: Honiara, Solomon Islands.
- Coordinates: 9°25′38″S 160°0′52″E
- Owner: Government of the Solomon Islands
- Capacity: 10,000
- Surface: Grass

Construction
- Groundbreaking: 5 May 2021
- Opened: 2023
- Cost: US$71 million
- Architect: Central South Architectural Design Institute
- Main contractor: China Civil Engineering Construction Corporation

Tenants
- Solomon Islands national football team Solomon Kings (OFCPL) (2026–present)

The Solomon Islands National Stadium is the national stadium of the Pacific island nation of the Solomon Islands and is located in the capital Honiara. The 10,000-seat venue was originally constructed as the main venue for the 2023 Pacific Games and was given to the country as a gift from the People's Republic of China at a cost of US$71 million. The venue can host association football, rugby, and athletics. At time of construction, it was the largest infrastructure project that China had undertaken in the Oceania region.

== History ==
The Solomon Islands were granted hosting rights to the 2023 Pacific Games in 2016. Originally, plans were to construct the new main stadium in Burns Creek before shifting to the Solomon Islands National University sports grounds. By 2019, the Solomon Islands government recognized that it would have difficulty funding necessary infrastructure projects. In July of that year, the government signed a memorandum of understanding with Taiwan for the latter to construct the stadium. About the donation, Secretary to the Prime Minister Jimmie Rodgers said, "The stadium is another example of the cordial relations between Solomon Islands and Taiwan".

After the Solomon Islands switched political allegiance from Taiwan to the People's Republic of China, the Chinese government committed to providing grants for the construction of the stadium and other projects for the games around the capital. At the time, both parties believed construction would begin in May 2021 and take twenty-four months to complete. Groundbreaking took place on 5 May 2021 with contracting work completed by the China Civil Engineering Construction Corporation and architecture work done by the Central South Architectural Design Institute. However, construction was significantly delayed because of the COVID-19 pandemic. Construction was also slowed by the discovery of unexploded World War II munitions that were discovered during excavation. The official handing-over ceremony for the finished stadium took place on 14 September 2023.

The first event held at the stadium was a friendly association football match between the Solomon Islands women's national team and Vanuatu scheduled for late October 2023.

== Controversies ==
Many members of the public and government, including opposition leader Matthew Wale, criticized the hosting of the Pacific Games and costs of construction and its long-term benefits. He believed other issues, such as public healthcare, should be prioritized. BenarNews reported that Prime Minister Manasseh Sogavare argued that the country's economy would have collapsed if it were not for the positive financial impact of the games. There were also concerns regarding China's expected return for funding the games and the cost to maintain the venues in the future.
