= List of American Samoa international footballers =

The American Samoa national football team represents the territory of American Samoa in international association football. It is fielded by Football Federation American Samoa, the governing body of football in American Samoa, and competes as a member of the Oceania Football Confederation (OFC), which encompasses the countries of Oceania. American Samoa played their first international match on 20 August 1983 in a 3–1 loss to Western Samoa in Apia.

American Samoa have competed in numerous competitions, and all players who have played in at least one international match, either as a member of the starting eleven or as a substitute, are listed below. Each player's details include his playing position while with the team, the number of caps earned and goals scored in all international matches, and details of the first and most recent matches played in. The names are initially ordered by number of caps (in descending order), then by date of debut, then by alphabetical order. All statistics are correct up to and including the match played on 18 July 2019.

== Introduction ==
The appearance record is held by goalkeeper Nicky Salapu. His last match for American Samoa was a match against Tahiti on 18 July 2019 in the Pacific Games, with American Samoa career summarizing on 22 caps.

The goalscoring record is held by Ramin Ott, with 3 goals in 15 matches, scored between 2007 and 2015. He set the record with his 3rd goal on 2 September 2015, in a 2–0 win over Tonga in a FIFA World Cup 2018 qualifier.

== Key ==
Positions key
GK	Goalkeeper
DF	Defender
MF	Midfielder
FW	Forward

Position
Playing positions are listed according to the tactical formations that were employed at the time.
Caps and goals
Caps and goals comprise those in the FIFA World Cup and OFC Nations Cup, their associated qualification matches, as well as Pacific Games matches and international friendly matches.

== Players ==
American Samoa national team football players
Player	Pos.	Caps	Goals	Debut		Last or most recent match		Ref.
Player	Pos.	Caps	Goals	Date	Opponent	Date	Opponent	Ref.
Nicky Salapu	GK	22	0	7 April 2001	Fiji	18 July 2019	Tahiti	
Uasila'a Heleta	DF	17	0	10 May 2004	Samoa	18 July 2019	Tahiti	
Ramin Ott	FW	15	3	10 May 2004	Samoa	4 September 2015	Cook Islands	
Jaiyah Saelua	DF	15	0	10 May 2004	Samoa	18 July 2019	Tahiti	
Travis Pita Sinapati	DF	13	0	7 April 2001	Fiji	1 September 2007	Tonga	
Natia Natia	MF	10	1	10 May 2004	Samoa	5 September 2011	Vanuatu	
Terrence Sinapati	DF	9	0	9 March 2002	New Caledonia	5 September 2011	Vanuatu	
Pesamino Victor	DF	9	0	25 August 2007	Solomon Islands	5 September 2011	Vanuatu	
Ryan Samuelu	DF	9	0	27 August 2015	Fiji	18 July 2019	Tahiti	
Maika Molesi	DF	8	0	10 May 2004	Samoa	1 September 2007	Tonga	
Liatama Amisone	MF	8	0	27 August 2011	Tuvalu	26 November 2011	Samoa	
Shalom Luani	FW	8	2	27 August 2011	Tuvalu	26 November 2011	Samoa	
Charlie Uhrle	FW	8	0	27 August 2011	Tuvalu	26 November 2011	Samoa	
Rafe Luvu	DF	7	0	27 August 2011	Tuvalu	26 November 2011	Samoa	
Justin Mana'o	DF	7	0	22 November 2011	Tonga	4 September 2015	Cook Islands	
Sam Baby Mulipola	MF	6	0	7 April 2001	Fiji	12 May 2004	Vanuatu	
Savaliga Afu	FW	6	1	12 March 2002	Tonga	17 May 2004	Papua New Guinea	
Duane Atuelevao	FW	6	1	9 March 2002	New Caledonia	17 May 2004	Papua New Guinea	
Moe Kuresa	MF	6	0	27 August 2011	Tuvalu	4 September 2015	Papua New Guinea	
Daru Taumua	DF	6	0	1 September 2011	Guam	26 November 2011	Samoa	
Rawlston Masaniai	MF	6	0	22 November 2011	Tonga	4 September 2015	Cook Islands	
Ovite Ace Lepou	DF	5	0	12 March 2002	Tonga	17 May 2004	Papua New Guinea	
Lemusa Alatasi	FW	5	0	27 August 2011	Tuvalu	5 September 2011	Vanuatu	
Ismael Herrera	MF	5	0	27 August 2011	Tuvalu	5 September 2011	Vanuatu	
Chris Faamoana	MF	5	0	8 July 2019	New Caledonia	18 July 2019	Tahiti	
Austin Kaleopa	MF	5	0	8 July 2019	New Caledonia	18 July 2019	Tahiti	
Roy Ledoux	DF	5	0	8 July 2019	New Caledonia	18 July 2019	Tahiti	
Walter Pati	DF	5	1	8 July 2019	New Caledonia	18 July 2019	Tahiti	
Kuresa Taga'i	MF	5	0	8 July 2019	New Caledonia	18 July 2019	Tahiti	
Milo Tiatia	MF	5	0	8 July 2019	New Caledonia	18 July 2019	Tahiti	
Ueli Tualaulelei	DF	5	0	8 July 2019	New Caledonia	18 July 2019	Tahiti	
Sulifou Faaloua	DF	4	0	7 April 2001	Fiji	14 April 2001	Tonga	
Ben Falaniko	FW	4	0	7 April 2001	Fiji	14 April 2001	Tonga	
Soe Falimaua	DF	4	0	7 April 2001	Fiji	14 April 2001	Tonga	
Lavalu Fatu	DF	4	0	7 April 2001	Fiji	14 April 2001	Tonga	
Pati Feagiai	MF	4	0	7 April 2001	Fiji	14 April 2001	Tonga	
Mexico Leututu	DF	4	0	7 April 2001	Fiji	14 April 2001	Tonga	
Tiaoali Savea	GK	4	0	7 April 2001	Fiji	14 April 2001	Tonga	
Im-Min Young	MF	4	0	7 April 2001	Fiji	14 April 2001	Tonga	
Ben Segaiga	DF	4	0	10 May 2004	Samoa	17 May 2004	Papua New Guinea	
Tanu Tanu	MF	4	0	10 May 2004	Samoa	17 May 2004	Papua New Guinea	
Viliamu Vaofanua	MF	4	0	10 May 2004	Samoa	17 May 2004	Papua New Guinea	
Thomas Leota	FW	4	0	25 August 2007	Solomon Islands	1 September 2007	Tonga	
Jordan Penitusi	GK	4	0	25 August 2007	Solomon Islands	1 September 2007	Tonga	
Tafuna Toilolo	MF	4	0	25 August 2007	Solomon Islands	1 September 2007	Tonga	
Alexander Victor	DF	4	0	25 August 2007	Solomon Islands	1 September 2007	Tonga	
Suani Uelese	FW	4	0	27 August 2011	Tuvalu	26 November 2011	Samoa	
Demetrius Beauchamp	FW	4	2	27 August 2015	Fiji	4 September 2015	Cook Islands	
Pita Falevalu	GK	4	0	27 August 2015	Fiji	4 September 2015	Cook Islands	
Jordan Grantz	MF	4	0	27 August 2015	Fiji	4 September 2015	Cook Islands	
Dylan Hardie-Jordan	MF	4	0	27 August 2015	Fiji	4 September 2015	Cook Islands	
Ne'emia Kaleopa	MF	4	0	27 August 2015	Fiji	4 September 2015	Cook Islands	
Takai Pouli	MF	4	0	8 July 2019	New Caledonia	15 July 2019	Solomon Islands	
Puni Samuelu	MF	4	0	8 July 2019	New Caledonia	18 July 2019	Tahiti	
Marshall Silao	MF	3	0	7 April 2001	Fiji	14 April 2001	Tonga	
Hansel Maiava	MF	3	0	25 August 2007	Solomon Islands	1 September 2007	Tonga	
Sue Tonise	MF	3	0	25 August 2007	Solomon Islands	1 September 2007	Tonga	
Edgar Apulu	MF	3	0	30 August 2011	Solomon Islands	5 September 2011	Vanuatu	
Diamond Ott	FW	3	0	22 November 2011	Tonga	26 November 2011	Samoa	
Faimalo Tupai	FW	3	0	22 November 2011	Tonga	26 November 2011	Samoa	
Panweichi Kaleopa	MF	3	0	27 August 2015	Fiji	4 September 2015	Cook Islands	
Tor-Lawrence Mana'o	MF	3	0	27 August 2015	Fiji	2 September 2015	Tonga	
Jason Si'i	MF	3	0	27 August 2015	Fiji	4 September 2015	Cook Islands	
Ryan Aloali'i Mitchell	FW	3	0	31 August 2015	Samoa	4 September 2015	Cook Islands	
Soga Maina	FW	2	0	7 April 2001	Fiji	9 April 2001	Samoa	
Alex Savea	MF	2	0	7 April 2001	Fiji	9 April 2001	Samoa	
Richard Mariko	MF	2	0	11 April 2001	Australia	14 April 2001	Tonga	
Robby Lvavata'i	FW	2	0	9 March 2002	New Caledonia	12 March 2002	Tonga	
Filimaua Fatu	FW	2	0	10 May 2004	Samoa	12 May 2004	Vanuatu	
Vaueli Nuusila	FW	2	0	15 May 2004	Fiji	17 May 2004	Papua New Guinea	
Tuaoloina Solofa	MF	2	0	25 August 2007	Solomon Islands	1 September 2007	Vanuatu	
Franky Silao	MF	2	0	27 August 2007	Samoa	1 September 2007	Tonga	
Chin-Fu Taase	GK	2	0	27 August 2007	Tuvalu	5 September 2007	Vanuatu	
Sam Kome	MF	2	0	27 August 2015	Fiji	2 September 2015	Tonga	
Kaleopa Siligi	MF	2	0	27 August 2015	Fiji	4 September 2015	Cook Islands	
Matthew Taga'i	DF	2	0	8 July 2019	New Caledonia	15 July 2019	Solomon Islands	
Mark Taga'i	MF	2	0	10 July 2019	Fiji	12 July 2019	Tuvalu	
Tuaki Latu	DF	2	0	15 July 2019	Solomon Islands	18 July 2019	Tahiti	
Darrell Ioane	FW	1	0	11 April 2001	Australia	11 April 2001	Australia	
Ito Telesa	FW	1	0	9 March 2002	New Caledonia	9 March 2002	New Caledonia	
Tavita Amani	MF	1	0	14 March 2002	Samoa	14 March 2002	Samoa	
Geoffrey Su'a	DF	1	0	15 May 2004	Fiji	15 May 2004	Fiji	
Roy Ameperosa	MF	1	0	17 May 2004	Papua New Guinea	17 May 2004	Papua New Guinea	
Willie Faataualofa	DF	1	0	17 May 2004	Papua New Guinea	17 May 2004	Papua New Guinea	
Ieti Taulealo	MF	1	0	29 August 2007	Vanuatu	29 August 2007	Vanuatu	
Paul Collins	DF	1	0	27 August 2015	Fiji	27 August 2015	Fiji	
Raphael Rocha	FW	1	0	27 August 2015	Fiji	27 August 2015	Fiji	
Junior Teoni	FW	1	0	10 July 2019	Fiji	10 July 2019	Fiji	
Hengihengi Ikuvalu	GK	1	0	15 July 2019	Solomon Islands	15 July 2019	Solomon Islands	
King Moe	FW	1	0	18 July 2019	Tahiti	18 July 2019	Tahiti	
