= American Samoa national football team results =

The American Samoa national football team represents American Samoa in association football and is controlled by the Football Federation American Samoa (FFAS), the governing body of the sport in the territory. Before joining Fédération Internationale de Football Association (FIFA) and the Oceania Football Confederation (OFC), it played its first match at the 1983 South Pacific Games – a 3–1 loss to Western Samoa.

From a total of 59 matches, American Samoa has won five (two against the Cook Islands, two against Tonga and one against Wallis and Futuna), drawn two and lost 52, scoring 36 goals and conceding 385. The majority of its matches have been played at neutral venues and the team has never played a home match.

In 1998, FFAS joined both FIFA and the OFC and the national team began competing in the qualifying stages of the FIFA World Cup and the OFC Men's Nations Cup. During their first qualifying campaign for the 2002 FIFA World Cup in April 2001, American Samoa was involved in a match which set the record for the largest margin of victory in international football. Archie Thompson scored 13 times as they lost 31–0 to Australia.

American Samoa had been on a 28-year losing streak before recording their first official win as a member of FIFA. Ramin Ott and Shalom Luani scored as they defeated Tonga 2–1 in qualifying for the 2014 FIFA World Cup in November 2011. Ali'i Mitchell became American Samoa's top goalscorer after scoring a brace against the U.S. Virgin Islands during the 2026 FIFA Series in March 2026. Mitchell has scored a total of four goals in seven caps between 2015 and 2026.

== Key ==
Key to matches

- Att. = Match attendance
- (H) = Home ground
- (A) = Away ground
- (N) = Neutral ground

Key to record by opponent

- Pld = Games played
- W = Games won
- D = Games drawn
- L = Games lost
- GF = Goals for
- GA = Goals against

== Results ==
American Samoa's score is shown first in each case.

No.	Date	Venue	Opponents	Score	Competition	American Samoa scorers	Att.	Ref.
1	20 August 1983	Apia (N)	Western Samoa	1–3	1983 South Pacific Games	Unknown	—	
2	22 August 1983	Apia (N)	Wallis and Futuna	3–0	1983 South Pacific Games	Unknown	—	
3	24 August 1983	Apia (N)	Tonga	2–3	1983 South Pacific Games	Unknown	—	
4	9 December 1987	Nouméa (N)	New Caledonia	0–10	1987 South Pacific Games		—	
5	10 December 1987	Nouméa (N)	Vanuatu	0–7	1987 South Pacific Games		—	
6	12 December 1987	Nouméa (N)	Wallis and Futuna	1–5	1987 South Pacific Games	Unknown	—	
7	15 December 1987	Nouméa (N)	Papua New Guinea	0–20	1987 South Pacific Games		—	
–	17 December 1987	Nouméa (N)	Tahiti	–	1987 South Pacific Games		—	
8	24 November 1994	Western Samoa (N)	Western Samoa	1–3	1994 Polynesia Cup	Unknown	—	
9	25 November 1994	Western Samoa (N)	Tahiti	1–2	1994 Polynesia Cup	Unknown	—	
10	28 November 1994	Western Samoa (N)	Tonga	1–2	1994 Polynesia Cup	Unknown	—	
11	2 September 1998	Rarotonga (N)	Tonga	0–3	1998 Polynesia Cup		—	
12	3 September 1998	Rarotonga (N)	Cook Islands	3–4	1998 Polynesia Cup	Unknown	—	
13	7 September 1998	Rarotonga (N)	Tahiti	0–12	1998 Polynesia Cup		—	
14	8 September 1998	Rarotonga (N)	Samoa	0–4	1998 Polynesia Cup		—	
15	6 June 2000	Paranuu Stadium, Papeete (N)	Tahiti	0–18	2000 Polynesia Cup		—	
16	10 June 2000	Paranuu Stadium, Papeete (N)	Cook Islands	0–3	2000 Polynesia Cup		—	
17	12 June 2000	Paranuu Stadium, Papeete (N)	Samoa	1–6	2000 Polynesia Cup	Unknown	—	
18	14 June 2000	Paranuu Stadium, Papeete (N)	Tonga	1–2	2000 Polynesia Cup	Unknown	—	
19	7 April 2001	International Sports Stadium, Coffs Harbour (N)	Fiji	0–13	2002 FIFA World Cup qualification		500	
20	9 April 2001	International Sports Stadium, Coffs Harbour (N)	Samoa	0–8	2002 FIFA World Cup qualification		200	
21	11 April 2001	International Sports Stadium, Coffs Harbour (N)	Australia	0–31	2002 FIFA World Cup qualification		3,000	
22	14 April 2001	International Sports Stadium, Coffs Harbour (N)	Tonga	0–5	2002 FIFA World Cup qualification		1,000	
23	9 March 2002	Toleofoa Joseph Blatter Soccer Complex, Apia (N)	New Caledonia	0–10	2002 OFC Nations Cup qualification		—	
24	12 March 2002	Toleofoa Joseph Blatter Soccer Complex, Apia (N)	Tonga	2–7	2002 OFC Nations Cup qualification	Atualevao, Afu	—	
25	14 March 2002	Toleofoa Joseph Blatter Soccer Complex, Apia (N)	Samoa	0–5	2002 OFC Nations Cup qualification		—	
26	18 March 2002	Toleofoa Joseph Blatter Soccer Complex, Apia (N)	Papua New Guinea	0–7	2002 OFC Nations Cup qualification		—	
27	10 May 2004	Toleofoa Joseph Blatter Soccer Complex, Apia (N)	Samoa	0–4	2006 FIFA World Cup qualification		500	
28	12 May 2004	Toleofoa Joseph Blatter Soccer Complex, Apia (N)	Vanuatu	1–9	2006 FIFA World Cup qualification	Natia	400	
29	15 May 2004	Toleofoa Joseph Blatter Soccer Complex, Apia (N)	Fiji	0–11	2006 FIFA World Cup qualification		300	
30	17 May 2004	Toleofoa Joseph Blatter Soccer Complex, Apia (N)	Papua New Guinea	0–10	2006 FIFA World Cup qualification		150	
31	25 August 2007	Toleofoa Joseph Blatter Soccer Complex, Apia (N)	Solomon Islands	1–12	2007 South Pacific Games	Ott	1,000	
32	27 August 2007	Toleofoa Joseph Blatter Soccer Complex, Apia (N)	Samoa	0–7	2007 South Pacific Games		2,800	
33	29 August 2007	Toleofoa Joseph Blatter Soccer Complex, Apia (N)	Vanuatu	0–15	2007 South Pacific Games		200	
34	1 September 2007	Toleofoa Joseph Blatter Soccer Complex, Apia (N)	Tonga	0–4	2007 South Pacific Games		200	
35	27 August 2011	Stade Rivière Salée, Nouméa (N)	Tuvalu	0–4	2011 Pacific Games		—	
36	30 August 2011	Stade Rivière Salée, Nouméa (N)	Solomon Islands	0–4	2011 Pacific Games		—	
37	1 September 2011	Stade Rivière Salée, Nouméa (N)	Guam	0–2	2011 Pacific Games		—	
38	3 September 2011	Stade Rivière Salée, Nouméa (N)	New Caledonia	0–8	2011 Pacific Games		—	
39	5 September 2011	Stade Rivière Salée, Nouméa (N)	Vanuatu	0–8	2011 Pacific Games		—	
40	22 November 2011	National Soccer Stadium, Apia (N)	Tonga	2–1	2014 FIFA World Cup qualification	Ott, Luani	150	
41	24 November 2011	National Soccer Stadium, Apia (N)	Cook Islands	1–1	2014 FIFA World Cup qualification	Luani	300	
42	26 November 2011	National Soccer Stadium, Apia (N)	Samoa	0–1	2014 FIFA World Cup qualification		1,500	
43	27 August 2015	Prince Charles Park, Nadi (A)	Fiji	0–6	Friendly		—	
44	31 August 2015	Loto-Tonga Soka Centre (Field 1), Nukuʻalofa (N)	Samoa	2–3	2018 FIFA World Cup qualification	Beauchamp (2)	200	
45	2 September 2015	Loto-Tonga Soka Centre (Field 1), Nukuʻalofa (N)	Tonga	2–1	2018 FIFA World Cup qualification	J. Manao, Ott	200	
46	4 September 2015	Loto-Tonga Soka Centre (Field 1), Nukuʻalofa (N)	Cook Islands	2–0	2018 FIFA World Cup qualification	Mitchell, J. Manao	250	
47	8 July 2019	National Soccer Stadium, Apia (N)	New Caledonia	0–5	2019 Pacific Games		100	
48	10 July 2019	National Soccer Stadium, Apia (N)	Fiji	0–9	2019 Pacific Games		250	
49	12 July 2019	National Soccer Stadium, Apia (N)	Tuvalu	1–1	2019 Pacific Games	Pati	250	
50	15 July 2019	National Soccer Stadium, Apia (N)	Solomon Islands	0–13	2019 Pacific Games		400	
51	18 July 2019	National Soccer Stadium, Apia (N)	Tahiti	1–8	2019 Pacific Games	Faamoana	140	
52	20 November 2023	Lawson Tama Stadium, Honiara (N)	Samoa	0–10	2023 Pacific Games		—	
53	23 November 2023	Lawson Tama Stadium, Honiara (N)	Solomon Islands	0–11	2023 Pacific Games		—	
54	27 November 2023	SIFF Academy Field, Honiara (N)	Northern Mariana Islands	0–4	2023 Pacific Games		—	
55	30 November 2023	SIFF Academy Field, Honiara (N)	Tonga	2–6	2023 Pacific Games	Vaitoelau, Silao	—	
56	6 September 2024	National Soccer Stadium, Apia (N)	Samoa	0–2	2026 FIFA World Cup qualification		600	
57	9 September 2024	National Soccer Stadium, Apia (N)	Cook Islands	2–1	Friendly	Mitchell, Stefanon	—	
58	25 March 2026	Juan Ramón Loubriel Stadium, Bayamón (N)	U.S. Virgin Islands	2–5	2026 FIFA Series	Mitchell (2)	—	
59	28 March 2026	Juan Ramón Loubriel Stadium, Bayamón (N)	Guam	0–6	2026 FIFA Series		—	

Notes

1. A: The American Samoa-Tahiti match at the 1987 South Pacific Games was not played. The result of the match would not have affected which teams would compete for the medals.
2. B: The 1994 Polynesia Cup doubled as qualifiers for the 1996 OFC Nations Cup.
3. C: The 1998 Polynesia Cup doubled as qualifiers for the 1998 OFC Nations Cup.
4. D: The 2000 Polynesia Cup doubled as qualifiers for the 2000 OFC Nations Cup.
5. E: The Oceanian qualifiers for the 2006 FIFA World Cup doubled as qualifiers for the 2004 OFC Nations Cup.
6. F: The men's football tournament at the 2007 South Pacific Games doubled as qualifiers for the 2008 OFC Nations Cup and the first round of qualifiers for the 2010 FIFA World Cup.
7. G: The Oceanian qualifiers for the 2014 FIFA World Cup doubled as qualifiers for the 2012 OFC Nations Cup.
8. H: The Oceanian qualifiers for the 2018 FIFA World Cup doubled as qualifiers for the 2016 OFC Nations Cup.

== Record by opponent ==
Team	Pld	W	D	L	GF	GA	GD	WPCT
Australia	1	0	0	1	0	31	−31	0.00
Cook Islands	5	2	1	2	8	9	−1	40.00
Fiji	4	0	0	4	0	39	−39	0.00
Guam	2	0	0	2	0	8	−8	0.00
Northern Mariana Islands	1	0	0	1	0	4	−4	0.00
New Caledonia	4	0	0	4	0	33	−33	0.00
Papua New Guinea	3	0	0	3	0	37	−37	0.00
Samoa (Note: Includes results as Western Samoa.)	12	0	0	12	5	56	−51	0.00
Solomon Islands	4	0	0	4	1	40	−39	0.00
Tahiti	4	0	0	4	2	40	−38	0.00
Tonga	10	2	0	8	12	34	−22	20.00
Tuvalu	2	0	1	1	1	5	−4	0.00
U.S. Virgin Islands	1	0	0	1	2	5	−3	0.00
Vanuatu	4	0	0	4	1	39	−38	0.00
Wallis and Futuna	2	1	0	1	4	5	−1	50.00
Total	59	5	2	52	36	385	−349	8.47

Source: Results
