= Jaiyah Saelua =

American Samoan footballer (born 1988)

Personal information
- Full name: Jaiyah Tauasuesimeamativa Saelua
- Date of birth: July 19, 1988 (age 38)
- Place of birth: Leone, American Samoa
- Height: 6 ft 2 in (1.88 m)
- Position: Center-back

Team information
- Current team: Ilaoa and To'omata
- Number: 16

Senior career*
| Years | Team | Apps | (Gls) |
- Konica Machine
- Savage FC
- Lion Heart FC
- FC SKBC
- Ilaoa and To'omata

International career^{‡}
| 2004–2019 | American Samoa | 15 | (0) |
- * Club domestic league appearances and goals ‡ National team caps and goals as of 18 July 2019

Jaiyah Tauasuesimeamativa Saelua (born July 19, 1988) is an American Samoan footballer who plays as a center-back for Ilaoa and To'omata and formerly the American Samoa national team.

Saelua is a faʻafafine, a third gender present in Polynesian society. She is the first openly non-binary person and trans woman to compete in a FIFA World Cup qualifier.

She was prominently featured in the 2014 documentary Next Goal Wins, about the American Samoa team, and the 2023 biographical comedy-drama of the same name directed by Taika Waititi, in which she is portrayed by Kaimana.

== Early life ==
Saelua took up football at school as an 11-year-old. Her first coach was Nicky Salapu, who was the goalkeeper during American Samoa's world-record 31–0 defeat to Australia in 2001. Saelua is a former performing arts student who studied at the University of Hawaiʻi.

== Club career ==
Saelua has played for former FFAS Senior League men's champions FC SKBC. She now plays for and captains her village club Ilaoa and To'omata. Following the 2023 OFC Champions League qualifying stage she announced that she was considering retirement.

== International career ==
=== Early career (2004–2011) ===
Saelua made her debut for the American Samoa national team as a 15-year-old during qualifying for the 2006 World Cup, appearing as a first-half substitute in an 11–0 defeat to Fiji. She then made a further three substitute appearances in qualifying for the 2010 World Cup, as well as 4 substitute appearances at the 2011 Pacific Games.

=== 2014 World Cup qualification campaign (2011) ===
With the arrival of coach Thomas Rongen in 2011, Saelua was given extended game time, and she made her first start for the team and achieved her first-ever international win against Tonga during qualifying for the 2014 World Cup. Until this point, American Samoa had been outscored 229–12 in all the international matches it had played, and were joint-last in the FIFA World Rankings. Saelua provided an assist and made a last-minute goalline clearance to help her team to the narrow 2–1 win, and she was declared woman of the match by her coach. She was later sent a letter by FIFA president Sepp Blatter, recognising her achievements as the first openly transgender footballer to appear in a World Cup qualifying match.

The team followed up the win against Tonga with a 1–1 draw with the Cook Islands. Needing only a win in team's last game against bitter rivals Samoa to progress to the next stage of qualification, the team fell agonisingly short, hitting the post in the dying minutes before a last-gasp Samoa goal eliminated the rival from the tournament.

American Samoa's efforts to qualify for the 2014 World Cup are chronicled in the 2014 British Documentary Film Next Goal Wins, in which Saelua plays an integral part. The film also documents the team's 2011 Pacific Games campaign.

=== Transition and 2019 Pacific Games (2015–2019) ===
Although intending to continue playing for the national team, Saelua was left out of the squad for qualifying for the 2018 World Cup. This was in part because she was undergoing her medical transition at the time. Saelua considered the possibility of playing for the American Samoa women's team after she had medically transitioned.

Saelua was recalled to the men's national squad for the 2019 Pacific Games, joining veteran goalkeeper Nicky Salapu. The team was managed by returning coach Tunoa Lui, who had previously presided over American Samoa's world-record 31–0 loss to Australia in 2001. In the team's first match, they were praised for performing better than expected in a 5–0 loss to one of the pre-tournament favourites New Caledonia, and Saelua was praised for her defensive performance. Saelua was also commended for her role in earning the team a 1–1 draw with Tuvalu. She received a yellow card during the match. This was the first game American Samoa had not lost at the tournament in 36 years.

== Managerial career ==
Saelua coached the American Samoan boys football team, Leone Lions, during the 2018–2019 Boys ASHSAA season. She led the team to the 2018–2019 ASHSAA Boys J-V title, for which she received the "Coach of the Year Award" from the Football Federation American Samoa.

== Style of play ==
Saelua plays in full make-up whenever she takes to the football field. She is known for her crunching tackles and is described as a defender who "takes no prisoners".

== Other football-related activities ==
Since becoming the first non-binary player to play in a FIFA-sanctioned tournament, Saelua has become a FIFA ambassador for equality and LGBT athletes. She was also appointed to the jury of the FIFA Diversity Award.

Saelua has also trained as a referee, and has helped referee matches in her American Samoan homeland.

== Personal life ==
Saelua is a faʻafafine, a third gender present in Polynesian society. Saelua began her gender transition before the 2018 World Cup Qualifiers in 2015. She has continued to play football after her transition, including at the 2019 Pacific Games.

== In popular culture ==
Saelua is featured in two films: firstly in the highly rated 2014 British documentary film Next Goal Wins, which documents the American Samoan football team's attempts to qualify for the 2014 FIFA World Cup and its first international win, and secondly in the Hollywood comedy-dramatization Next Goal Wins directed by Taika Waititi. Waititi had considered casting Saelua to play herself in the movie, but ultimately chose fellow Samoan faʻafafine Kaimana for the role. The movie was released on November 17, 2023.

Saelua is mentioned in the book Thirty-One Nil: On the Road With Football's Outsiders. She is also mentioned in the children's book Football School Star Players: 50 Inspiring Stories of True Football Heroes.

== Career statistics ==
As of 18 July 2019

Appearances and goals by national team and year
| National team | Year | Apps | Goals |
|---|---|---|---|
| American Samoa | 2004 | 1 | 0 |
| American Samoa | 2007 | 3 | 0 |
| American Samoa | 2011 | 7 | 0 |
| American Samoa | 2019 | 4 | 0 |
| Total | | 15 | 0 |
