= Next Goal Wins =

Next Goal Wins may refer to:

- Next Goal Wins (2014 film), 2014 documentary film by directed by Mike Brett and Steve Jamison
- Next Goal Wins (2023 film), 2023 drama-comedy film by Taika Waititi
