= Shalom Luani =

Samoan American football player (born 1994)

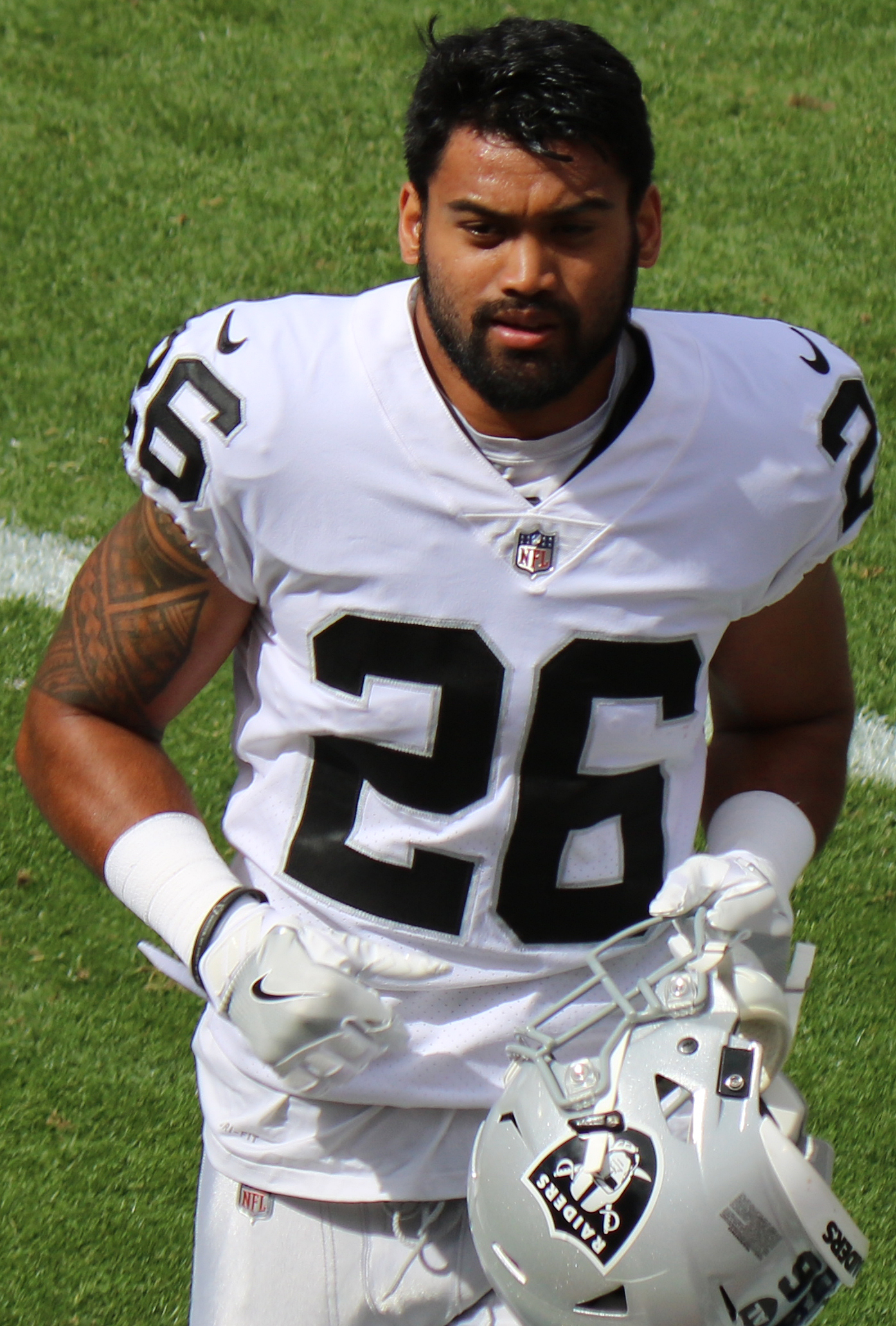
- Luani with the Oakland Raiders in 2017

Personal information
- Born: August 5, 1994 (age 32) Pago Pago, American Samoa
- Height: 6 ft 0 in (183 cm)
- Weight: 201 lb (91 kg; 14 st 5 lb)
Association football career
- Height: 5 ft 11 in (1.80 m)
- Position: Forward
Senior career*
Years	Team	Apps	(Gls)
2009–2011	Tafuna Jets		
2011–2012	Faga'itua Vikings (futsal)		
International career
2011	American Samoa U17	4	(0)
2011	American Samoa U20	3	(0)
2012	American Samoa U23	3	(1)
2011	American Samoa	8	(2)
- * Club domestic league appearances and goals

Sport
- Football career

No. 26, 24
- Position: Safety

Career information
- High school: Faga'itua (Faga'itua, American Samoa)
- College: Washington State
- NFL draft: 2017: 7th round, 221st overall pick

Career history
- Oakland Raiders (2017); Seattle Seahawks (2018); Los Angeles Chargers (2019); Houston Texans (2019–2020)*; New Jersey Generals (2022–2023); Michigan Panthers (2024)*
- * Offseason or practice squad member only

Awards and highlights
- All-USFL Team (2022); First-team All-Pac-12 (2016)

Career NFL statistics
- Total tackles: 28
- Pass deflections: 2
- Stats at Pro Football Reference

Shalom Luani (born August 5, 1994) is a former American football safety. He has also represented American Samoa in soccer, having scored against Tonga in American Samoa's first-ever win in FIFA-sanctioned play. Luani, who played as a forward, scored twice for American Samoa in November 2011, making him (at the time) the country's joint–top goalscorer of all time with fellow forward Ramin Ott.

He played college football at Washington State, and was selected by the Oakland Raiders in the seventh round of the 2017 NFL draft. His American football career has also encompassed spells at Faga'itua High School, Chabot College, and the City College of San Francisco. He has also been a member of the Seattle Seahawks, Los Angeles Chargers, and Houston Texans of the NFL, and the New Jersey Generals of the United States Football League (USFL).

== Association football career ==
=== Club career ===
From 2009 to 2011, Luani played for ASFA Soccer League club Tafuna Jets, along with his brother Sumeo. In October 2011, Luani scored a hat-trick in Tafuna's 4–4 draw with Atu'u Broncos.

In February 2011, Luani played for the Faga'itua Vikings in the inaugural ASHSAA Boys' Futsal tournament, held at Samoana High School. The Vikings won the tournament after defeating Tafuna Warriors 5–4 on February 22. Luani's brother Roy was also playing for the Vikings and Shalom assisted his sibling for the game's opening goal before scoring a free kick himself. The American Samoa Football Federation suggested that the brothers were the difference between the two teams, saying: "Shalom Luani was everywhere, whether it be defending or assisting on goals while his older sibling's tenacity, nose for the ball and no fear play were huge keys in winning the first ever Futsal championship in ASHSAA history".

On May 7, 2012, Luani played for the Faga'itua Vikings in the final of the ASHAA Boys' Soccer Championship, against Samoana Sharks at the Veterans Memorial Stadium in Pago Pago. Shalom scored to help his side to a 3–2 win and the Championship title, although the forward was injured and taken to hospital following a collision with Samoana's Palauni Taposua. Despite missing some of the game, Luani was voted the match's MVP, an award that was collected by his father Penitito.

=== International career ===
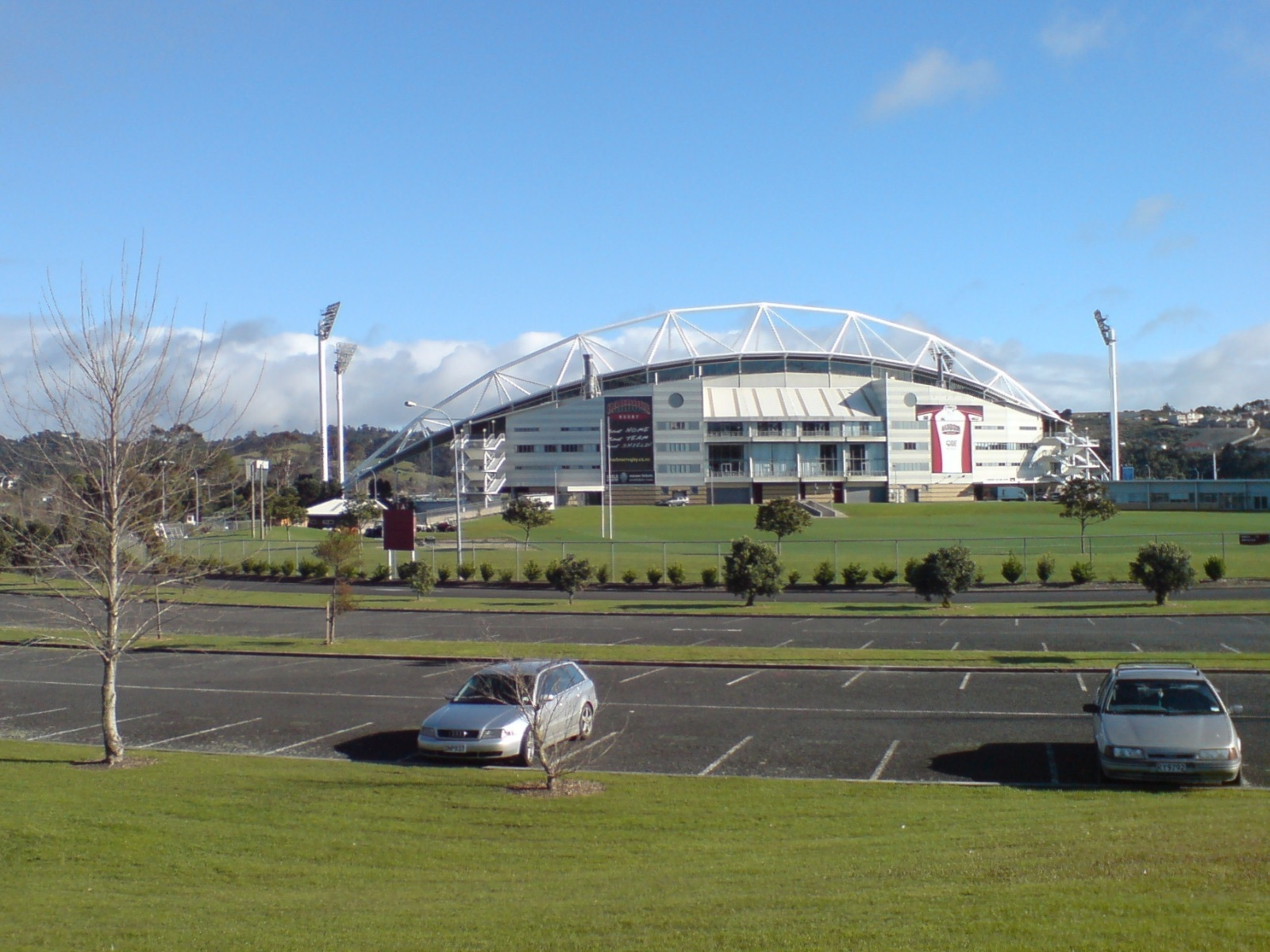
Luani represented American Samoa at the North Harbour Stadium in Albany, New Zealand during the 2011 OFC U-17 Championship.

==== Under-17 ====
Luani made his debut for American Samoa's under-17 team in a 9–0 loss to Fiji on January 8, 2011. He made his second appearance for the side in a 2–1 defeat against Papua New Guinea four days later. With the score at 1–1, goalscorer Ryan Petaia was fouled by goalkeeper Benjamin Wilbert, resulting in a penalty that Luani took, but his effort stuck the crossbar. Luani's third and fourth appearances for the U-17 side were in a 4–0 loss to New Zealand and in a 7–0 loss to Vanuatu. All four games came in the 2011 OFC U-17 Championship in New Zealand.

==== Under-20 ====
Luani made his debut for American Samoa's under-20 team in a 7–0 loss to Vanuatu on April 21, 2011. He made his second appearance for the side in a 5–1 defeat against Papua New Guinea two days later. Luani's third and final game for the U-20 side came in a 5–1 loss to Fiji on April 25, 2011. All three games came in the 2011 OFC U-20 Championship in New Zealand. Luani played in defence during the tournament and wore the no.3 shirt for American Samoa.

==== Under-23 ====
In March 2012, Luani was selected as part of American Samoa's under-23 Olympic squad, along with his brother Roy. Luani played for the side on March 18, 2012, in a 7–1 loss to Fiji in an Olympic qualifier. Two days later, Luani opened the scoring for American Samoa in another Olympic qualifier against the Solomon Islands on March 20, 2012. The goal would prove to be his side's only bright spot in a 16–1 loss.

==== Senior side ====
Following his performances for the under-20 side, Luani was called up to the American Samoa senior team for the 2011 Pacific Games by coach Iofi Lalogafuafua. Luani's under-20 teammates Suani Uelese, Frederick Charles Uhrle, Ismael D'Angelo Herrera, Moe Kuresa and Daru Taumua were also called up the squad.

Luani made his debut for the senior side in their opening fixture of the tournament, in a 4–0 loss to Tuvalu on August 27, 2011. Playing as a forward, he was replaced late in the game by substitute Lemusa Alatasi. He earned his second cap three days later in a 4–0 loss to the Solomon Islands, this time playing the full ninety minutes. Luani also played ninety minutes in all of American Samoa's remaining group stage matches, a 2–0 loss to Guam on September 1, an 8–0 defeat to New Caledonia two days later and another 8–0 loss, to Vanuatu, on September 5, 2011.

Following American Samoa's elimination from the Pacific Games, and now under the stewardship of Dutch-born American coach Thomas Rongen, Luani earned his sixth senior cap in American Samoa's historic 2–1 victory over Tonga on November 23, 2011. Luani scored his first international goal by chipping Tonga goalkeeper Kaneti Falela in the second half to give American Samoa a 2–0 lead. The win was American Samoa's first ever in a FIFA-sanctioned match. Luani continued this form into the next match, against the Cook Islands on November 25, 2011. He gave American Samoa the lead in the first half after dispossessing Cook Islands defender Nathan Tisam and beating goalkeeper Tony Jamieson. This goal, Luani's second in international football, made him American Samoa's joint–top scorer of all time, tied with Ramin Ott. Incidentally, a British film unit had been documenting the team over the course of the year, so both his goals were shown in Next Goal Wins, which was released in 2014.

Luani's eighth senior international appearance came in American Samoa's 1–0 loss to Samoa on November 27, 2011, with the result knocking them out of the 2014 FIFA World Cup. Luani revealed that he almost did not feature in the match due to American football commitments, saying "I play [American football] for my high school and we have a play-off match at the same time as this tournament. I left it up to the coaches to decide what was best for me. I will just take whatever opportunity comes up."

==== International goals ====
#	Date	Venue	Opponent	Score	Result	Competition
1.	November 22, 2011	National Soccer Stadium, Apia, Samoa	Tonga	2–0	2–1	2014 OFC WCQ First Round
2.	November 24, 2011	National Soccer Stadium, Apia, Samoa	Cook Islands	1–0	1–1	2014 OFC WCQ First Round
Correct as of April 21, 2014

== American football career ==
=== High school ===
Luani began his American football career as a defensive back for the Faga'itua Vikings, representing Faga'itua High School and wearing the number 21 jersey for the team. Competent in both association and American football, Luani has stated "I am keen to keep playing both at the moment because I am not sure which one will be my best option for the future. I would like to make a career in one but I don't know which yet, I guess I will find out later on."

At the age of 15, in September 2009, Luani was named the Junior Varsity division's MVP, being selected by the coaches of other teams. He earned the accolade for his "perfectly executed trick plays" that helped the Vikings to an undefeated season.

In June 2010, Luani represented Faga'itua in an under-18s Rugby Sevens tournament held at the Veterans Memorial Stadium in Pago Pago. Luani was voted the tournament's MVP as Faga'itua won the cup, defeating Leone Whites 7–0 in the final. Faga'itua's head coach, Tuiaua Pio Grohse, suggested that Luani had been the difference between the two sides in the final, saying "They had a very good team, and we had a hard time scoring against them until a minute and a half left in the game, when Shalom Luani crossed the try line and added a score for our team".

On December 31, 2011, Luani represented American Samoa in a Samoa Bowl match against Hawaii. American Samoa eventually won 34–28 after double overtime, with Luani scoring the final touchdown to seal his country's victory.

In February 2012, Luani was included in an American Samoa All Star Team for an under-19 Junior Oceania Bowl championship match against Australia. The winner would represent the World Team against Team USA at the IFAF World Championship in June 2012. American Samoa won the match 93–7, with Luani scoring on a punt return, an interception return, a two-point run and an extra point kick.

From June to July 2012, Luani represented the American Samoa under-19 American football team at the 2012 IFAF U-19 World Championship, playing in his country's 27–6 loss to first seed United States on June 30 and being named American Samoa's MVP for the match. He made his second appearance of the competition in a 51–0 win over Panama on July 3. Luani played a prominent role in the victory, assisting five of his team's eight scores and scoring a 23-yard field goal. Luani then played in American Samoa's 27–14 victory against France in the fifth-place play-off on July 7, 2012.

=== College career ===
"With the way he runs with the ball after those interceptions, he'd be our best running back if he didn't play defense."

— George Rush, City College of San Francisco football coach, December 2014

Having joined Chabot College of California in June 2012, Luani was part of the team's roster for the 2012–13 season. Chabot suffered a poor start to the campaign, losing their first four games, but in October the side embarked on a six-game win streak that saw them undefeated until mid-November. By September 2013, Luani was playing for the City College of San Francisco; he starred in a 61–0 win over Fresno City College in October 2013. CCSF ended the season with an 11–2 record, earning a regional title, and Luani was unanimously named Bay 6 Conference Defensive Player of the Year by the conference's coaches as well as gaining All-California Region and junior college All-American First Team accolades.

By the end of 2014, Luani had established himself as a bright talent on the college circuit and was rated a four-star prospect. In December, he spurned scholarship offers from Illinois and Oregon State to join the Washington State Cougars; he had initially committed to Oregon in August but flipped his commitment after the departure of their head coach. At the time of his signing by WSU, intended to improve their struggling defense, Luani had already been recognised by national media. Described as "highly regarded in recruiting circles" by the Cougars, he was ranked 38th on the ESPN JC50, 19th overall junior college player by Scout.com and as the country's top junior college safety by 247Sports. Luani's signing was positively met by Cougars fans.

In October 2015, Luani was named Pac-12 defensive player of the week, the first such accolade for a Cougar player since 2013; having made an "immediate impact" according to the Seattle Times, the American Samoan had started every game of the season.

=== Professional career ===
Pre-draft measurables
Height	Weight	Arm length	Hand span	40-yard dash	10-yard split	20-yard split	20-yard shuttle	Three-cone drill	Vertical jump	Broad jump	Bench press
5 ft 11 3/8 in (1.81 m)	202 lb (92 kg)	32 in (0.81 m)	9 3/4 in (0.25 m)	4.55 s	1.58 s	2.65 s	4.21 s	6.87 s	31.0 in (0.79 m)	9 ft 8 in (2.95 m)	12 reps
All values from NFL Combine

==== Oakland Raiders ====
Luani was selected by the Oakland Raiders in the seventh round, 221st overall, in the 2017 NFL draft, making him the first American Samoa-born player to be drafted by the organization. In the 2017 season opener against the Tennessee Titans, Luani successfully recovered a surprise onside kick to begin the game.

==== Seattle Seahawks ====
On September 1, 2018, Luani was traded to the Seattle Seahawks for a 2019 seventh-round draft pick. He was waived on September 12, 2018, and was re-signed to the practice squad. He was promoted back to the active roster on September 15, 2018. He was waived on August 31, 2019.

==== Los Angeles Chargers ====
On October 9, 2019, Luani was signed to the Los Angeles Chargers practice squad. He was promoted to the active roster on November 2, 2019. He was waived on November 30, 2019.

==== Houston Texans ====
On December 4, 2019, Luani was signed to the Houston Texans practice squad. He signed a reserve/future contract with the Texans on January 13, 2020. He was waived on July 27, 2020.

==== New Jersey Generals ====
Luani was drafted by the New Jersey Generals of the United States Football League (USFL) in the 18th round of the 2022 USFL draft. He was transferred to the team's inactive roster on April 30 due to a leg injury. He was transferred back to the active roster on May 12. Luani re-signed with the Generals on July 16, 2023. The Generals folded when the XFL and USFL merged to create the United Football League (UFL).

==== Michigan Panthers ====
On January 5, 2024, Luani was selected by the Michigan Panthers during the 2024 UFL dispersal draft. He was released on March 10, 2024.

== Personal life ==
Luani is the son of Penitito and Niukini Luani and, like his parents, hails from the village of Masausi. Luani graduated from Masefau Elementary before attending Fagaitua High School. In June 2012, Luani was one of 32 of the island's students who were honoured in the Student-Athlete Ceremony of Recognition where student athletes officially signed on with the colleges of their choice; Luani joined Chabot College in Hayward, California.

Luani's brother Roy, who is a year older, is also an association footballer and also plays as a forward. Roy has played for the American Samoa under-20 side, but is yet to appear for the senior team. The two also played alongside each other for the Fagaitua High School American Football team. Luani has family in North Carolina, but had hardly met them before moving to the United States in 2012. Of Luani's personality, his coach at San Francisco, George Rush said in 2014: "He's quiet, kind of shy, very polite, very respectful. The success he's enjoyed hasn't tainted any of that."

In 2016, he was involved in an altercation outside of a Domino's Pizza in Pullman when his order allegedly took two hours. Prosecutors declined to press charges, saying there was not enough evidence to show Luani wasn't defending himself.

== Association football career statistics ==
=== International ===
Appearances and goals by national team and year
National team	Year	Apps	Goals
American Samoa	2011	8	2
Total		8	2

Scores and results list American Samoa's goal tally first, score column indicates score after each Luani goal.

List of international goals scored by Shalom Luani
No.	Date	Venue	Opponent	Score	Result	Competition
1	22 November 2011	National Soccer Stadium, Apia, Samoa	Tonga	2–0	2–1	2014 FIFA World Cup qualification
2	24 November 2011	National Soccer Stadium, Apia, Samoa	Cook Islands	1–0	1–1	2014 FIFA World Cup qualification
