= Pago Pago Park =

Park in American Samoa

Coordinates: 14.27165°S 170.7013°W

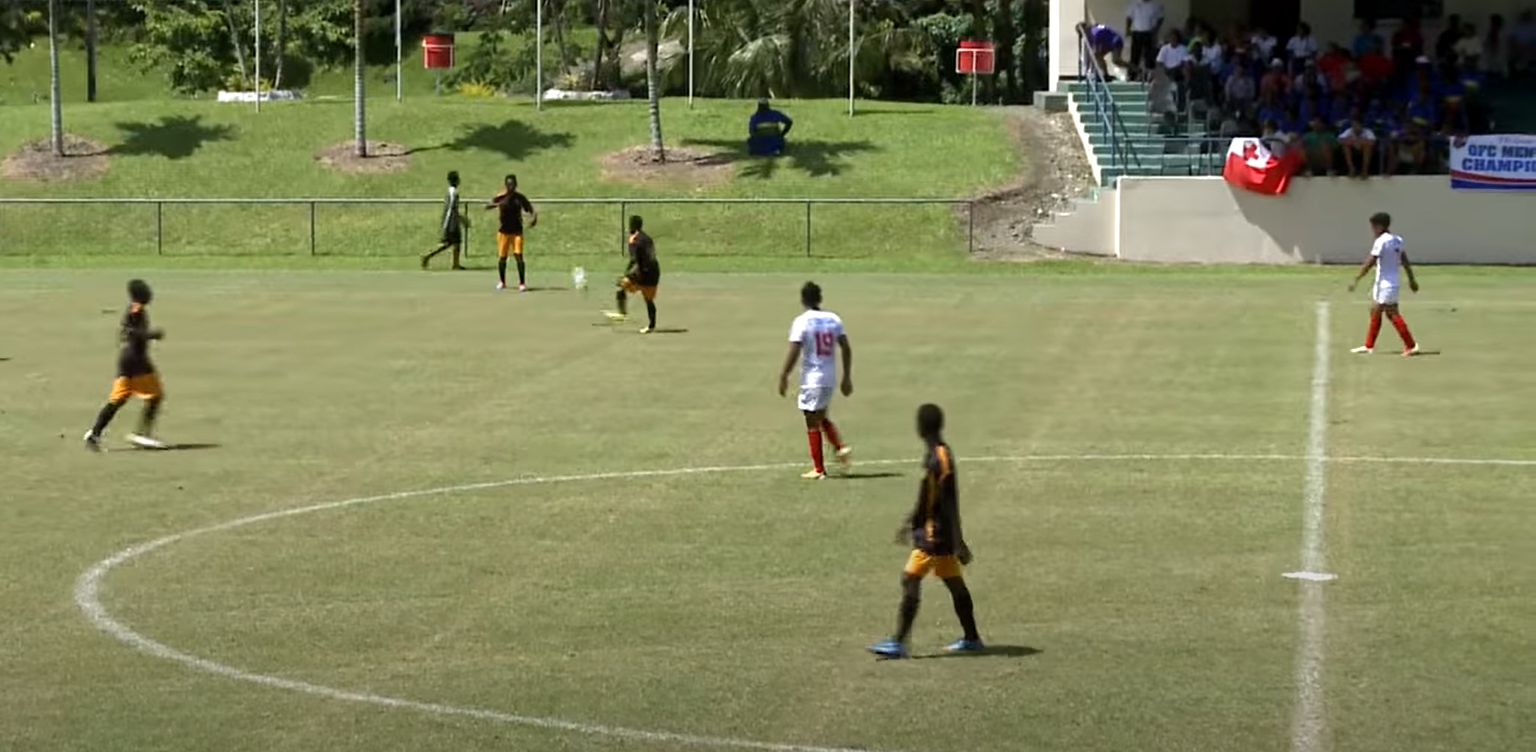
Pago Park Soccer Stadium

Pago Pago Park is a 20-acre public recreational and cultural complex located at the head of Pago Pago Harbor in Pago Pago, American Samoa.

== Description ==
The park was created in the 1960s by filling in tidal mud flats and removing mangroves near the mouth of the Vaopito and Laolao Streams. Since its development, the park has become a hub for sports, social gatherings, and cultural events.

The park features a range of recreational facilities, including basketball and tennis courts, a soccer field, and a boat ramp. Pago Park Soccer Stadium, with a capacity of 2,000, is the home ground of the American Samoa national football team and hosts matches for the FFAS Senior League and the OFC Champions League. The stadium was featured in the 2014 film Next Goal Wins.

Pago Pago Park is also home to the Korean House, a social center for Korean fishermen, and several Korean food kiosks. The park houses a collection of fales where local artisans practice traditional handicrafts such as weaving, carving, and shellwork. It is a central gathering place for the community, hosting both formal and informal sports activities, including rugby, soccer, volleyball, basketball, American football, and cricket. It is a popular location for large events such as the annual Flag Day celebrations, Fourth of July festivities, and fiafias organized for political purposes.

In addition to its recreational and cultural significance, the park houses important institutions such as the Football Federation American Samoa.
