= Gabriel Taumua =

American Samoan footballer

Personal information
- Full name: Gabriel Emani Taumua
- Date of birth: 13 April 2002 (age 24)
- Place of birth: Utulei, American Samoa
- Positions: Midfielder; defender

Team information
- Current team: Pago Youth

Senior career*
Years	Team	Apps	(Gls)
2017–	Pago Youth		

International career^{‡}
2015–2018	American Samoa U17	7	(4)
2016–2018	American Samoa U20	6	(0)
2019–	American Samoa U23	3	(0)
2024–	American Samoa	2	(0)
- * Club domestic league appearances and goals ‡ National team caps and goals as of 22:29, 8 September 2024 (UTC)

Gabriel Taumua (born 13 April 2002) is an American Samoan association footballer who plays for Pago Youth FC of the FFAS Senior League. Taumua has been described by Football in Oceania as, "the biggest talent in American Samoa".

== Youth career ==
Taumua began playing football at any early age as his father Tavita Taumua is CEO of the Football Federation American Samoa. As a child he featured as a ballboy in the documentary Next Goal Wins which followed the American Samoa national team during its 2014 FIFA World Cup qualification campaign.

He competed for the Sharks of Samoana High School in the American Samoa High School Athletic Association. The Sharks advanced to the final for the 2016 and 2017 seasons. They won the championship in 2017. In 2017 Taumua also won the island's futsal championship with Utulei Youth. Taumua's scored the equalizing goal which sent the final match to overtime.

== Club career ==
Taumua has played for Pago Youth FC of the FFAS Senior League since 2017. During the 2018 season, Pago Youth defeated Taputimu Youth 4–0 in the semi-finals. The team went on to defeat Utulei Youth 3–2 in the final with Taumua being named MVP of the match. With the win Pago Youth secured its third-straight league championship. Earlier in 2018, Taumua was part of the American Samoa delegation to the Football For Hope Festival in Moscow as part of 2018 FIFA World Cup festivities. He was part of Pago Youth's team that competed in the 2018 OFC Champions League qualifying stage, but he was not part of the squad that participated in the 2019 OFC Champions League qualifying stage the following year. He appeared in all three of the club's matches in 2018, including matches against Lotohaʻapai United, Vailima Kiwi FC, and Tupapa Maraerenga F.C.

== International career ==
Taumua made his international debut for American Samoa in the 2015 OFC U-17 Championship at age 12. He was the youngest player in the competition. In 2016 he captained the team during its First Round exit from the 2017 OFC U-17 Championship. He then went on to captain the team again in qualifying for the 2018 edition of the tournament. Despite his young age it was the player's sixth international tournament. The team opened its qualifying campaign with a 2–2 draw with Tonga in which Taumua scored the opening goal. The Fiji Times described Taumua as the, "rock at the back of a side which looked confident on attack..." In the next match American Samoa suffered a heavy 3–10 defeat to Samoa with Taumua scoring two of his team's three goals. American Samoa defeated the Cook Islands in its final match with Taumua scoring his team's opening goal. He was also part of American Samoa's squad for the 2016 OFC U-20 Championship.

In 2017 he was part of the squad which competed in the 2017 OFC Youth Futsal Tournament in Auckland, New Zealand. This was the inaugural edition of the tournament and the first time that American Samoa competed in any international futsal competition. With three goals he was the team's second top scorer in the tournament, behind only Walter Pati who scored six times.

During the 2018 OFC U-19 Championship Taumua captained American Samoa once again. His defensive qualities were crucial in maintaining a scoreless draw in the first half of the team's opening match against Samoa. In the final match, a 1–2 defeat to the Cook Islands, Taumua's defensive work was again instrumental. American Samoa's only goal of the tournament came off of a rebound from Taumua's free-kick in the match.

In 2019 Tuamua was part of the squad for the 2019 OFC Men's Olympic Qualifying Tournament. He started and played the full ninety minutes of the team's opening match against the Solomon Islands.

=== Career statistics ===
As of match played 8 September 2024.

American Samoa
Year	Apps	Goals
2024	2	0
Total	2	0

=== Youth international goals ===
Scores and results list American Samoa's goal tally first.

No	Date	Venue	Opponent	Score	Result	Competition
1.	14 July 2018	Loto-Tonga Soka Centre, Nukuʻalofa, Tonga	Tonga U17	1–0	2–2	2018 OFC U-16 Championship qualification
2.	17 July 2018	Loto-Tonga Soka Centre, Nukuʻalofa, Tonga	Samoa U17	1–4	3–10	2018 OFC U-16 Championship qualification
3.	17 July 2018	Loto-Tonga Soka Centre, Nukuʻalofa, Tonga	Samoa U17	2–5	3–10	2018 OFC U-16 Championship qualification
4.	20 July 2018	Loto-Tonga Soka Centre, Nukuʻalofa, Tonga	Cook Islands U17	1–0	3–1	2018 OFC U-16 Championship qualification
Last updated 14 October 2021
