= American Samoa women's national under-17 football team =

National association football team

American Samoa Women's U-17
- Nickname: The Girls from the territory
- Association: Football Federation American Samoa
- Confederation: OFC (Oceania)
- Head coach: (American Samoa) Ruth Tuato'o
- Captain: Elcy Naolavoa
- Top scorer: Salamasina Satele (3)
- Home stadium: Veterans Memorial Stadium
- FIFA code: ASA
First colors	Second colors

First international
- American Samoa 1–4 Fiji (Apia, Samoa; 4 August 2017)

Biggest win
- Papua New Guinea 0–1 American Samoa (Auckland, New Zealand; 14 June 2024); Papua New Guinea 0–1 American Samoa (Matavera, Cook Islands; 29 April 2025); Cook Islands 4–5 American Samoa (Matavera, Cook Islands; 2 May 2025)

Biggest defeat
- American Samoa 0–11 Samoa (Auckland, New Zealand; 20 June 2024)

World Cup
- Appearances: 0

OFC U-17 Women's Championship
- Appearances: 1 (first in 2017)
- Best result: Group stage

The American Samoa women's national under-17 football team is the second highest women's youth team of women's football in American Samoa and is controlled by the Football Federation American Samoa, the governing body of the sport in the territory.

== History ==
American Samoa participated in the OFC U-17 Women's Championship for the first time in 2017.

== OFC Championship Record ==
OFC U-17 Women's Championship								Qualification record					
Year	Round	Pld	W	D	L	GF	GA	Pld	W	D	L	GF	GA
(New Zealand) 2010	Did not enter							No qualification					
(New Zealand) 2012	Did not enter							No qualification					
(Cook Islands) 2016	Did not enter							No qualification					
OFC U-16 Women's Championship								Qualification record					
Year	Round	Pld	W	D	L	GF	GA	Pld	W	D	L	GF	GA
(Samoa) 2017	Group stage	3	0	0	3	2	14	No qualification					
(French Polynesia) 2023	Did not enter							No qualification					
(Fiji) 2024	Did not qualify							2	1	0	1	1	11
(Samoa) 2025	Group stage	3	0	0	3	1	9	2	2	0	0	6	4
Total	Group stage	3	0	0	6	3	23	4	3	0	1	7	15

== Current technical staff ==
Position	
Head coach	(American Samoa) Ruth Tuato'o
Assistant Coach	(American Samoa) Ati Faamau-Samuelu
Technical Advisor	(Fiji) Ruben Luvu
Physio	(Samoa) Luao Wasko
Team Manager	(American Samoa) Amio Luvu
Advisor	(American Samoa) Sandra Fruean
Staff	(American Samoa) Jeannete Ting
Head of Delegation	(American Samoa) Faiivae Luli Godinet

== Current squad ==
Squad chosen for the 2025 OFC U-16 Women's Championship

No.	Pos.	Player	Date of birth (age)	Caps	Goals	Club
1	GK	Leila Salausa				(Football Federation American Samoa)
2		Salvation Tu'ulaupua				(Football Federation American Samoa)
3		Keira Gaisoa				(Football Federation American Samoa)
4		Hope Malala				(Football Federation American Samoa)
5		Sally Tagaloa				(Football Federation American Samoa)
6		Wendolynn Tua				(Football Federation American Samoa)
7		Maryjane Laina (capt.)			2	(Football Federation American Samoa)
8		Salamasina Satele			3	(Football Federation American Samoa)
9		Abigail Lam Sam			1	(Football Federation American Samoa)
10		Amanda Tuavao				(Football Federation American Samoa)
11		Ita Magalo				(Football Federation American Samoa)
12		Diamond Joung			1	(Football Federation American Samoa)
13		Hailey Brice				(Football Federation American Samoa)
14		Elenor Polikapo				(Football Federation American Samoa)
15		Anaiyah Vee				(Football Federation American Samoa)
19		Naimanu Samuelu				(Football Federation American Samoa)
16		Kimirley Tiamagiagi				(Football Federation American Samoa)
17		Honoreeleigh Malala				(Football Federation American Samoa)
18		Nancy Polaunga				(Football Federation American Samoa)
20	GK	Reililah Noa				(Football Federation American Samoa)
21		Anovale Savea				(Football Federation American Samoa)
22		Tupulua Vaouli				(Football Federation American Samoa)
23	GK	Lauagaia Konelio Semi				(Football Federation American Samoa)

== List of Coaches ==
- (American Samoa) Ruth Tuato'o (2017-

== See also ==
- American Samoa women's national football team
- American Samoa men's national football team
- American Samoa men's national under-23 football team
- American Samoa men's national under-20 football team
- American Samoa men's national under-17 football team
