= Diego Gómez (footballer, born 1990) =

Spanish footballer

Diego
Personal information
- Full name: Diego José Gómez Heredia
- Date of birth: 12 February 1990 (age 36)
- Place of birth: Salamanca, Spain
- Height: 1.83 m (6 ft 0 in)
- Position: Goalkeeper

Team information
- Current team: American Samoa (head coach)

Youth career
- 1998–2002: Real Madrid
- 2002–2009: Barcelona

Senior career*
Years	Team	Apps	(Gls)
2009	Olesa Montserrat		
2009–2010	Palamós		
2010–2011	Gramenet B	34	(0)
2011–2012	Terrassa	29	(0)
2012	Southern	2	(0)

Managerial career
- 2021–2022: Queensboro FC II
- 2023: Albion San Diego
- 2024: Irvine Zeta FC
- 2024: Phoenix Rising FC (interim)
- 2026–: American Samoa
- * Club domestic league appearances and goals

Diego José Gómez Heredia (born 12 February 1990) is a Spanish football coach and former player who is currently head coach of the American Samoa national team.

== Club career ==
Born in Salamanca, Castile and León, Diego joined Barcelona's La Masia in 2002, aged 11, after a stint at rivals Real Madrid. He was released in 2009, and made his senior debut with Olesa Montserrat in the Tercera División.

On 10 December 2009 Diego joined Palamós, also in the fourth level. In July 2010 he moved to Gramenet, but spent the vast majority of his spell exclusively the reserves, only appearing on the bench with the main squad on 2 January 2011, in a 1–1 away draw against Dénia.

In the summer of 2011, Diego signed for fourth-tier club Terrassa, being a regular starter for the side. In August 2013 he moved abroad for the first time in his career, joining Hong Kong Premier League side Southern.

Diego made his professional debut on 1 September 2012, starting in a 1–3 away loss against Hong Kong Rangers. He only appeared in one further match before being released in October.

Diego retired in December 2012, aged only 22, mainly due to injuries.

== Coaching career ==
After retiring, Diego was a coach in an AC Milan youth setup in Hong Kong. In the 2014 summer he was appointed delegate of Sant Andreu's Juvenil squad.

In 2015 Diego moved to China to lead Teng Football Academy in Shenzhen.

In 2017 Diego joined the project of Spanish superstar David Villa on his DV7 Soccer Academy in South Korea directing the academy and coaching the U18 K League team.

Diego went to coach Queensboro FC II in the USL Academy and UPSL in 2021 and 2022, where he won the USL Academy Northeast and went to the national finals both season. In UPSL 2022 Queensboro FC won the UPSL East region championship and made it to the National Semifinals.

In 2023 Diego Gómez started his professional coaching career at Albion San Diego in NISA winning the Coach of the season award. Gomez was named head coach of NISA expansion team Irvine Zeta FC on January 22, 2024, but before he coached a game, he was hired as an assistant coach for Phoenix Rising FC on February 6, 2024.

In late June 2024, Diego was named interim head coach for Phoenix, following the dismissal of Danny Stone. In October 2024, Diego was named USL Championship coach of the week. Diego and Phoenix parted ways on 7 November 2024 after leading the team to a 6-3-8 record and a first-round exit in the USL Championship playoffs.
