= Jason Siʻi =

American Samoan footballer (born 1983)

Personal information
- Date of birth: December 27, 1983 (age 42)
- Place of birth: California, United States
- Position: Midfielder

Team information
- Current team: Team Puebla Oregon

International career
Years	Team	Apps	(Gls)
2015	American Samoa	3	(0)

Jason Siʻi (born December 27, 1983) is an American Samoan soccer midfielder. Born in the United States, he is an American Samoa international.

== Early life ==
Moving to Oregon at an early age, Siʻi began playing soccer at second grade despite having an antipathy for the sport. Committing to varsity soccer at East Linn Christian Academy and Corban University both in Oregon, he is an inhabitant of Lebanon, Oregon playing in the Willamette Valley Soccer League with Team Puebla Oregon.

He is an American Samoa international.

He played college soccer in the United States.

== International ==
His heritage is from American Samoa, so he decided to play for them.
