= Nicky Salapu =

American Samoan footballer (born 1980)

Personal information
- Full name: Nicky Vitolio Salapu
- Date of birth: 13 September 1980 (age 46)
- Place of birth: Aua, American Samoa
- Position: Goalkeeper

Team information
- Current team: FC Hawai'i (goalkeeper coach)

Senior career*
Years	Team	Apps	(Gls)
–2001	PanSa East		
2001	Palm Beach		
2025	Royal Puma		

International career
2001–2026	American Samoa	24	(0)

Managerial career
- 2018: Tacoma Community College (goalkeeper coach)
- 2026–: American Samoa (goalkeeper coach)
- 2026–: FC Hawai'i (goalkeeper coach)
- * Club domestic league appearances and goals

Nicky Vitolio Salapu (born 13 September 1980) is an American Samoan footballer and goalkeeper coach who plays as a goalkeeper for the American Samoa national football team.

Salapu conceded a total of 91 goals in the 2002 and 2006 World Cup qualifiers, including a 31-0 loss to Australia which holds the record for the biggest loss in international football while also starting in American Samoa's first ever official FIFA World Cup qualifiers win. After the game, Salapu said: "I feel like a champ right now. Finally I'm going to put the past behind me."

His stint with the American Samoa national team was covered in the 2014 documentary Next Goal Wins, and the 2023 biographical comedy-drama also called Next Goal Wins.

== Club career ==
Salapu started his football career aged 10, formerly being a rugby player.

Salapu played for PanSa East in his early career. Salapu was offered a trial with Palm Beach SC in 2001, after stopping over 30 shots against the Socceroos, whom he played with for 6 months. He would later move to Seattle, rejecting a professional contract in Detroit. He has since played for various recreational and amateur teams in the Washington area.

Despite rumors circulating online about Salapu joining Austrian club SC Mauerbach in 2008, Salapu contradicted those claims in an interview with Marca in 2011.

In 2018, Salapu was the goalkeeper coach for Tacoma Community College. In 2025, Salapu briefly returned to the OFC region, playing for Royal Puma in the 2025 OFC Men's Champions League qualifying stage in the Cook Islands. In 2026, Salapu signed for FC Hawai'i as a goalkeeper coach after settling in Waipahu. He was given the role of goalkeeper coach for the American Samoa national football team for the 2026 FIFA Series, as well as being registered as a player.

== International career ==
Salapu conceded 31 goals to Australia in a 2002 World Cup qualifying match on April 11, 2001, which became a world record that still stands to this day. Salapu later said that he hid tears from his teammates. He also suffered from prolonged distress, and as a form of psychological therapy, Salapu coped by using the American Samoa squad in the FIFA World Cup video game series on his PlayStation. He would then repeatedly play against Australia with the second controller either left unplugged or used by his son, allowing him to easily defeat the squad.

In 2007, Salapu missed his flight from Hawaii to the South Pacific Games in Samoa. Because he could not make it on time, he was replaced by the 17-year-old Jordan Penitusi. He was not eligible to play until he arrived for the last match of American Samoa in the South Pacific Games with Tonga, but there he was an unused substitute. In November 2011, Salapu was the goalkeeper when American Samoa won its first ever full FIFA match, a 2–1 win over Tonga during the first round of the OFC qualifiers for the 2014 FIFA World Cup. In 2015, he was called up as substitute goalkeeper for the 2018 World Cup Qualifiers.

He represented American Samoa at the 2019 Pacific Games in Apia. Salapu has been selected for the American Samoan team at the 2023 Pacific Games in Honiara and the 2026 FIFA Series in Puerto Rico.

== Personal life ==
His son Dylan is also a footballer.

Salapu has lived in Australia, American Samoa and the United States.

He lived in Washington from 2002 to 2025, before moving to Hawaii, where he currently resides.

== Career statistics ==
=== International ===
American Samoa
Year	Apps	Goals
2001	4	0
2002	1	0
2004	4	0
2011	8	0
2019	5	0
2024	2	0
2026	0	0
Total	24	0

== See also ==
- Next Goal Wins (2014 film)
