= David Brand (footballer) =

English football manager

Personal information
- Full name: David John Brand
- Date of birth: 25 October 1951 (age 75)
- Place of birth: Manchester, England
- Position: Striker

Youth career
- 1968–1970: Northern Nomads
- 1970–1972: Leeds Carnegie College

Senior career*
Years	Team	Apps	(Gls)
1972–1973	Stockport County		
1979–1980	Wigan Athletic		

Managerial career
- 2002–2005: Samoa
- 2007: American Samoa
- * Club domestic league appearances and goals

David Brand was an English football manager who was in charge of the Samoa national football team and American Samoa national football team.

Brand was born in Manchester, England. He played as a striker for Northern Nomads as a youth player followed by Leeds/Carnegie College before joining Stockport County. He scored 2 goals on his debut at Spotland against Rochdale in a Lancashire League game. He later played for Stalybridge Celtic, Ashton United, and Wigan Athletic. In 1976 he moved to Australia to play for Gosnells City and West Australia. In 1978/9 he played for Hong Kong club Urban Services. In 1980 he played for Napier City Rovers in New Zealand, then for Southport and Irlam Town in England before returning to Australia in 1981 to join Cockburn Utd in Perth.

He later coached Cockburn, Morley Windmills, Kwinana Utd, Subiaco, Armadale and Southside Utd before moving into full-time management in 1996 with the Queensland Soccer Federation in Central Queensland and Gold Coast Soccer 1998 to 2002.

He was appointed National Coach of Samoa in November 2002, supervising all National Teams male and female until May 2005. An administration project with FIFA followed in American Samoa from 2005 to 2008, including taking the Men's National Team in the Pacific Games and World Cup Qualifiers 2007. A FIFA project followed in Samoa in 2008/9 before linking up with the Oceania Football Confederation and Papua New Guinea Football Association in 2009 to 2015.

He was appointed Deputy CEO FIFA U-20 Women's World Cup Papua New Guinea 2016 Local Organising Committee.
