= Next Goal Wins (2023 film) =

Film by Taika Waititi

- Theatrical release poster
- Directed by: Taika Waititi
- Screenplay by: Taika Waititi; Iain Morris
- Based on: Next Goal Wins by: Mike Brett; Steve Jamison
- Produced by: Jonathan Cavendish; Garrett Basch; Taika Waititi; Mike Brett; Steve Jamison
- Starring: Michael Fassbender; Oscar Kightley; Kaimana; David Fane; Rachel House; Beulah Koale; Taika Waititi; Will Arnett; Elisabeth Moss
- Cinematography: Lachlan Milne
- Edited by: Nicholas Monsour
- Music by: Michael Giacchino
- Production companies: Imaginarium Productions; Defender Films; Garrett Basch Production
- Distributed by: Searchlight Pictures
- Release dates: September 10, 2023 (TIFF); November 17, 2023 (United States); December 26, 2023 (United Kingdom)
- Running time: 104 minutes
- Countries: United States; United Kingdom
- Language: English
- Budget: $14 million
- Box office: $18.6 million

Next Goal Wins is a 2023 sports comedy drama film directed by Taika Waititi, who co-wrote it with Iain Morris. Based on the 2014 documentary of the same name by Mike Brett and Steve Jamison, it stars Michael Fassbender as Thomas Rongen, with Oscar Kightley, Kaimana, David Fane, Rachel House, Beulah Koale, Will Arnett, and Elisabeth Moss.

Next Goal Wins premiered at the Toronto International Film Festival on September 10, 2023, and was released in the United States on November 17, 2023, by Searchlight Pictures.

== Plot ==
In 2001, the American Samoa national football team suffered a 0–31 defeat against Australia. After that, the team went through a long period without any notable victories.

After yet another humiliating defeat at the 2011 Pacific Games, Tavita Taumua, head of the nation's football federation, announces that he will hire a new coach. Meanwhile, in the United States, football coach Thomas Rongen has just been sacked by the American Soccer Federation. He is then offered the position of coach for American Samoa, and Rongen reluctantly accepts the offer. When Rongen begins his new job, he is frustrated by the players' lack of football skill and the islands' limited facilities. He also dislikes Jaiyah — a transgender (faʻafāfine) defender — because he thinks Jaiyah lacks discipline and focus. Eventually, the two are involved in a minor brawl after Rongen taunts Jaiyah by calling her by her legal birth name.

Jaiyah later visits Rongen's house to apologize and the two agree to forgive each other. With Jaiyah's help, Rongen travels around the islands to recruit new faces for the squad. Rongen changes his training approach and begins to show more respect toward the American Samoan players and staff. Although they lack football skills and have to work at multiple jobs, they are still passionate enough to do everything to support the national team. Four weeks after Rongen's first arrival in American Samoa, the team are finally ready to play their first competitive match under Rongen, against Tonga in a FIFA World Cup qualification match. Rongen chooses Jaiyah as the captain for this match. American Samoa start the match well. However, the pressure begins to affect them after Rongen repeatedly yells and throws a tantrum in front of his players. Eventually, Tonga score, after intercepting a misplaced American Samoan pass, and the first half ends with Tonga still leading 1–0.

During the half-time break in the dressing room, Rongen angrily calls the players useless and accuses them of not trying to play seriously. Rongen later announces his resignation from the head coach position and plans to leave the stadium immediately. Before Rongen is able to leave the stadium, Taumua convinces Rongen to rethink his decision. Eventually, Rongen relents and returns to the dressing room. Rongen apologizes to his players and tells them to play as they want to, without worrying about the result. Rongen also tells them that two years prior, he lost his daughter in an accident, and that that event had affected him so deeply that he continues to feel guilty and has often showed emotional outbursts throughout his managerial career. Feeling touched and motivated by Rongen's speech, the American Samoa players play a lot better in the second half, and eventually score an equalizing goal. However, when the players and staffs are celebrating the goal, Taumua suddenly faints due to heatstroke.

Taumua later wakes up after the match has ended. His son, Daru, who also played in the match, later explains that when his father was still unconscious, American Samoa were able to score another goal and ended the match in a 2–1 victory. During a gathering with American Samoan players and staffs, Rongen announces that he will leave his position as American Samoa head coach because he wants to take an extended break from football. Although initially shocked, Taumua accepts Rongen's decision and wishes him well for the future.

The epilogue covers what happened after the events of the film. Since defeating Tonga 2–1 in 2011, American Samoa has never again been at the bottom of the world rankings. Rongen went on to be the Chief Scout for the United States national team, before working as a commentator at CBS Sports. Jaiyah was the first openly transgender athlete to compete in a World Cup Qualifier, and later became FIFA ambassador for equality.

== Cast ==
- Michael Fassbender as Thomas Rongen
- Oscar Kightley as Tavita Taumua
- Kaimana as Jaiyah Saelua
- David Fane as Ace
- Rachel House as Ruth
- Beulah Koale as Daru Taumua
- Will Arnett as Alex Magnussen
- Elisabeth Moss as Gail
- Uli Latukefu as Nicky Salapu
- Chris Alosio as Jonah
- Lehi Makisi Falepapalangi as Pisa
- Semu Filipo as Rambo
- Ioane Goodhue as Smiley
- Rhys Darby as Rhys Marlin
- Angus Sampson as Angus Bendleton
- Luke Hemsworth as Keith
- Kaitlyn Dever as Nicole
- Hio Pelesasa as Samson
- David Tu'itupou as Tall David
- Levy Tuiala as Chief Sila
- Loretta Ables Sayre as Rambo's mother
- Frankie Adams as Frangipani
- Taika Waititi as an American-Samoan priest

== Production ==
=== Development ===
It was announced in August 2019, that Fox Searchlight Pictures had set up an initially unspecified project that would see Taika Waititi write and direct prior to his obligations to Thor: Love and Thunder (2022). It was later revealed as being a feature film adaptation of the 2014 documentary Next Goal Wins. Waititi, Garrett Basch and Jonathan Cavendish serve as producers, with Andy Serkis, Will Tennant and Kathryn Dean as executive producers.

=== Casting ===
In September 2019, Michael Fassbender entered final negotiations to star in the film. He would be confirmed the next month, alongside Elisabeth Moss entering negotiations to join. In November 2019, it was announced Kaimana, Oscar Kightley, David Fane, Beulah Koale, Lehi Falepapalangi, Semu Filipo, Uli Latukefu, Rachel House, Rhys Darby, Angus Sampson, Chris Alosio and Sisa Grey had joined the cast of the film, with Moss being confirmed. In December 2019, Armie Hammer joined the cast of the film, playing an executive with Football Federation American Samoa.

=== Filming ===
Principal photography began in November 2019 in Honolulu, Hawaii, and wrapped by January 2020. In December 2021, it was announced that Will Arnett would be stepping in for Hammer following allegations of sexual assault made by multiple women against the latter. The part, initially intended as a cameo, was expanded when Arnett joined. In May 2023, Kaitlyn Dever was announced as part of the cast.

== Release ==
The film premiered at the Toronto International Film Festival on September 10, 2023, prior to its commercial release on November 17, 2023. The film was originally set to be released on April 21, 2023, before being postponed to September 22, 2023, and then to its current date. The film's cast, however, was unable to attend the premiere due to the restrictions imposed by the 2023 SAG-AFTRA strike.

Next Goal Wins released for digital platforms on January 16, 2024, followed by a Blu-ray and DVD release on February 27, 2024.

== Reception ==
=== Box office ===
Next Goal Wins grossed $6.7 million in the United States and Canada, and $11.9 million in other territories, for a worldwide gross of $18.6 million.

In the United States and Canada, Next Goal Wins was released alongside The Hunger Games: The Ballad of Songbirds & Snakes, Trolls Band Together, and Thanksgiving, and was projected to gross around $5 million from 2,240 theaters in its opening weekend. It went on to debut to $2.5 million, finishing eighth at the box office. The film made $1.6 million in its second weekend (a drop of 35.1%), finishing in 11th.

=== Critical response ===
On the review aggregator website Rotten Tomatoes, 46% of 169 critics' reviews are positive, with an average rating of 5.2/10. The website's consensus reads: "Next Goal Wins finds director/co-writer Taika Waititi with his heart in the right place, even if his crowd-pleasing aim has noticeably strayed from its target." Metacritic, which uses a weighted average, assigned the film a score of 44 out of 100, based on 42 critics, indicating "mixed or average" reviews. Audiences polled by CinemaScore gave the film an average grade of "B+" on an A+ to F scale, while those polled by PostTrak gave it an 86% overall positive score, with 65% saying they would definitely recommend the film.

Peter Bradshaw of The Guardian gave the film 3 out of 5 stars, writing that the film had sacrificed "the stranger-than-fiction value" of the documentary it was based on, as well as criticizing some of the film's casting decisions. Overall, Bradshaw described the film as "broad, affectionate and often funny in a goofy way", and while questioning Fassbender's casting instead of an actor more known for his comedic roles, wrote that "like the intensely committed professional actor that he is, Fassbender works hard to fabricate a comedy performance and more or less makes it work."

== See also ==
- List of association football films
