= Iofi Lalogafuafua =

American Samoan football manager

Personal information
- Place of birth: American Samoa

Managerial career
- Years: Team
- 2011: American Samoa

Iofi Lalogafuafua is an American Samoan professional football manager.

== Career ==
In 2011, he coached the American Samoa national football team.
