= Thomas Rongen =

Dutch-American football coach (born 1956)

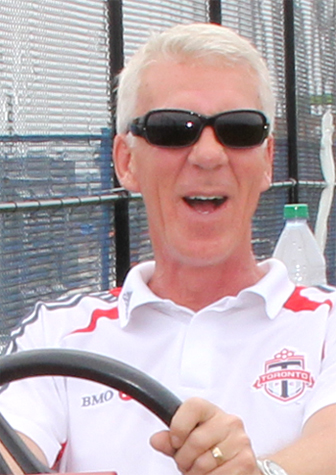
- Rongen in 2012

Personal information
- Full name: Thomas Eddy Rongen
- Date of birth: 31 October 1956 (age 70)
- Place of birth: Amsterdam, Netherlands
- Height: 6 ft 0 in (1.83 m)
- Positions: Midfielder; forward

Youth career
- 1971–1975: AFC

Senior career*
Years	Team	Apps	(Gls)
1973–1979	AFC		
1979–1980	Los Angeles Aztecs	40	(6)
1979–1980	Los Angeles Aztecs (indoor)	12	(3)
1980	Washington Diplomats	10	(0)
1981–1983	Fort Lauderdale Strikers	83	(4)
1984	Minnesota Strikers	5	(0)
1984–1985	Minnesota Strikers (indoor)	18	(0)
1985	South Florida Sun		
1985–1986	Chicago Sting (indoor)	14	(1)
1987	Houston Dynamos		
1988–1993	Fort Lauderdale Strikers		

Managerial career
- 1984–1988: Pope John Paul II Eagles
- 1988: South Plantation Paladins
- 1989–1994: Fort Lauderdale Strikers
- 1991–1995: Nova Southeastern Sharks
- 1996: Tampa Bay Mutiny
- 1997–1998: New England Revolution
- 1999–2001: D.C. United
- 2001–2005: United States U20
- 2005: Chivas USA
- 2006–2011: United States U20
- 2011: American Samoa
- 2014–2015: Tampa Bay Rowdies
- 2024: American Samoa
Medal record
Representing United States (as head coach)
Runner-up	CONCACAF U-20 Championship	2009
- * Club domestic league appearances and goals

Thomas Eddy Rongen (born 31 October 1956) is a Dutch-American football coach who has spent the majority of his playing and coaching career in the United States.

Rongen won the MLS Coach of the Year award in MLS's inaugural season in 1996, leading the Tampa Bay Mutiny to the best regular-season record.

His stint managing the American Samoa national team was covered in the 2014 documentary Next Goal Wins, and the 2023 biographical comedy-drama film of the same name, starring Michael Fassbender as Rongen.

== Playing career ==
Rongen began his playing career with Amsterdamsche FC, with whom he played as defensive midfielder and defender from 1973 to 1979.

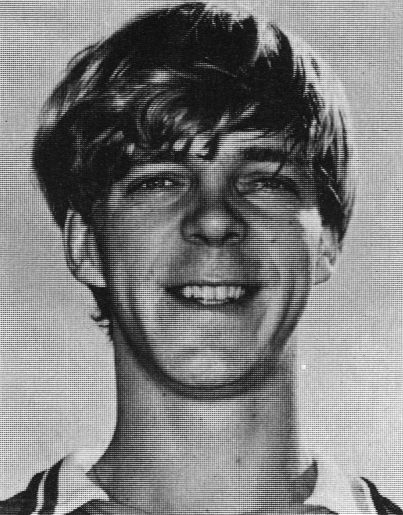
Rongen with the Aztecs in 1979

In 1979, Rongen moved to the United States, joining the Los Angeles Aztecs of the North American Soccer League. Rongen spent the entire 1979 season with the Aztecs. He then began the 1980 season in Los Angeles. On 12 July 1980, the Aztecs sold his contract to the Washington Diplomats. The team folded at the end of the season and Rongen moved to the Fort Lauderdale Strikers where he would remain for the next three seasons. In 1984, Joe Robbie, owner of the Strikers, moved the team to Minneapolis, Minnesota where it was renamed the Minnesota Strikers. Rongen moved with the team and spent the 1984 outdoor season there. The league collapsed at the end of the season.

The Strikers moved to the Major Indoor Soccer League for the 1984–1985 season. On 22 May 1985, Rongen joined the South Florida Sun of the United Soccer League. The league lasted six games, then collapsed. In October 1985, Rongen signed as a free agent with the Chicago Sting of MISL. At the end of the season, he moved to Florida to coach youth and high school soccer. In 1987, he played for the Houston Dynamos of the Lone Star Soccer Alliance. On 8 January 1988, he became the first player to sign with the Fort Lauderdale Strikers of the newly established American Soccer League. He continued to play for the Strikers until 1993.

== Coaching career ==
Rongen began his coaching career as an assistant with the Pope John Paul II High School boys' team in 1984. On 27 June 1986, he was named as head coach. During his tenure coaching PJPII, he took the team to a 32–6–5 record and he was a two time Sun-Sentinel Coach of the Year. He resigned from his position on 16 May 1988. He also coached with the Plantation Eagles Soccer Club. This led to his selection as coach of the Florida U-23 soccer team which defeated the United States national team with goals from Zen Luzniak and Henry Gutierrez in an 8 March 1987 scrimmage. Rongen also served as an assistant with the Nova Southeastern University men's soccer team. In August 1988, he was hired to coach the South Plantation High School boys' team.

On 8 February 1989, he replaced Wim Suurbier as head coach of the Strikers. He took the Strikers to the 1989 ASL title and then skippered the team to a victory over the San Diego Nomads in the national championship game. He was the 1990 APSL Coach of the Year. In August 1994, he resigned as head coach. In November 1990, he replaced Hal Henderson as head coach of Nova Southeastern University. He coached the team for five seasons, compiling a 50–35–8 record.

=== Major League Soccer ===
==== Tampa Bay Mutiny ====
Rongen was one of the inaugural coaches in MLS, coaching the Tampa Bay Mutiny in their first season in 1996, with whom he won the MLS regular season (and what would retrospectively become the Supporters' Shield), and also won MLS Coach of the Year Award.

==== New England Revolution ====
On November 5, 1996 the New England Revolution traded their first-round pick in the 1997 MLS College Draft to the Tampa Bay Mutiny in exchange for the right to hire Rongen as their new head coach. Rongen coached the Revolution to their first-ever playoff appearance in the 1997 season, but was unable to replicate the success he had in Tampa Bay. When asked about his struggles in New England, Rongen referenced "cancers" in the locker room that undermined team performance in 1998, and stated "a lot of things happened behind the scenes that I didn't know about until it was too late," adding that "there were different factions where players didn't know who to trust anymore.

Ultimately Rongen announced his resignation on August 24, 1998, following an 8-18 campaign in his second and final year in New England. In 58 matches in charge, Rongen led the Revolution to a 23-35 record.

==== D.C. United ====
Following his two year stint with the Revolution, Rongen succeeded Bruce Arena as the head coach of D.C. United, which he led to the Supporters' Shield and MLS Cup titles in 1999. He was a finalist for 1999 MLS Coach of the Year, but lost out to Sigi Schmid. Rongen's D.C. United missed the playoffs in both 2000 and 2001, and he lost his job with United in 2001, and was replaced with Ray Hudson.

=== National teams ===
Upon leaving United, Rongen was appointed head coach of the United States men's U20 national team, which he coached from 2001 to his appointment as head coach of Chivas USA for the team's inaugural season in 2005. However, ten games into the season, with the team's record standing at one win, one tie, and eight losses, he was let go of his head coaching duties.

Rongen was appointed head coach of the United States men's U20 national team again in 2006 and led the team to the 2007 and 2009 FIFA U-20 World Cups. He was fired from that position in May 2011 after the team failed to qualify for the 2011 U-20 World Cup.

=== American Samoa rebirth ===
In 2011, Rongen became the head coach of American Samoa. With Rongen at the helm, and after three weeks training them both physically and inspirationally, American Samoa registered its second ever victory on 22 November 2011, against Tonga, in the 2014 World Cup qualification. Under Rongen, American Samoa reached 173rd in the FIFA World Rankings. His work with the American Samoa team is at the center of the 2014 British documentary, Next Goal Wins and the Taika Waititi directed film of the same name, starring Michael Fassbender as Rongen.

=== MLS and NASL ===
Rongen became director of TFC Academy prior to the 2012 season, joining countrymen Aron Winter and Bob de Klerk at Toronto FC.

He was named head coach of the Tampa Bay Rowdies in December 2014. Rongen was fired along with General Manager and President, Farrukh Quraishi on 21 August 2015.

In late 2016, Rongen was hired by Bruce Arena as the head international scout for the United States national team program.

== Commentator jobs ==
He is currently a sports commentator for CBS Sports and beIN Sports.

== Personal life ==
Rongen married Gail Megaloudis in 1996. He is stepfather to Gail's children with Nicky Megaloudis, Nicole and Chris. In 2004, Nicole died in a single car accident on I-64 West in Goochland County, Virginia, aged 19. Rongen wore his stepdaughter's baseball cap during American Samoa's win over Tonga, as shown in Next Goal Wins.

== Honours ==
Fort Lauderdale Strikers

- American Soccer League: 1989

Tampa Bay Mutiny

- Supporters' Shield: 1996

D.C. United

- MLS Cup: 1999
- Supporters' Shield: 1999

United States U20

- CONCACAF Under-20 Championship: 2009

Individual

- American Professional Soccer League Coach of the Year: 1990
- MLS Coach of the Year Award: 1996

== See also ==
- List of Major League Soccer coaches
