= Tunoa Lui =

American Samoan football coach

Tunoa Lui is an American Samoan football coach who trained the national team of American Samoa for a period of one year. He resigned from the position in 2001. Since 2017 he is the coach of the American Samoa national under-18 futsal team.

== Biography ==
Lui was in charge of American Samoa in the 31–0 loss against Australia in a qualifying match for the 2002 World Cup.

Tunoa Lui, who was appointed only a year before, left on the 30th of July, 2001. The American Samoa national team was then without a coach for two years before the appointment of Ian Crook in 2003.

He later coached Samoa's football team for the Oceania Cup.
