= American Samoa national under-23 football team =

National youth association football team

American Samoa U23
- Nickname: The boys from the territory
- Association: Football Federation American Samoa (FFAS)
- Confederation: OFC (Oceania)
- Head coach: (United States) Stephen Settle
- Captain: Ueli Tualaulelei
- Top scorer: Duane Atuelevao (2)
- FIFA code: ASA
First colors	Second colors

First international
- Tonga 3–0 American Samoa (Auckland, New Zealand; 14 January 2004)

Biggest win
- None

Biggest defeat
- American Samoa 1–16 Solomon Islands (Taupō, New Zealand; 21 March 2012)

OFC Men's Olympic Qualifying Tournament
- Appearances: 3 (first in 2004)
- Best result: Group stage (2004, 2012, 2019)

The American Samoa national under-23 football team, also known as American Samoa U23, represents American Samoa at U23 tournaments. The team is considered to be the feeder team for the American Samoa national football team. They are controlled by the FFAS

== History ==
American Samoa U23 made three appearances so far at the OFC U23 Championship. They never reached any further than the Group Stage. So far they also never won a game. They managed to score a total of four goals. Duane Atuelevao is with two goals the top scorer. He scored them in a 3-2 loss against the Cook Islands in 2004.

=== OFC ===
The OFC Men's Olympic Qualifying Tournament is a tournament held once every four years to decide the only qualification spot for Oceania Football Confederation (OFC) and representatives at the Olympic Games.

OFC Men's Olympic Qualifying Tournament
Year	Round	Pld	W	D	L	GF	GA
(Australia) (New Zealand) 1988	Did not enter						
(Fiji) 1991	Did not enter						
(Australia) 1996	Did not enter						
(New Zealand) 1999	Did not enter						
(Australia) (New Zealand) 2004	Group stage	4	0	0	4	2	25
(Fiji) 2008	Did not enter						
(New Zealand) 2012	Group stage	3	0	0	3	2	31
(Papua New Guinea) 2015	Did not enter						
(Fiji) 2019	Group stage	3	0	0	3	0	23
(New Zealand) 2023	Withdrew						
Total	Group stage	10	0	0	10	4	79

== Current squad ==
The following players were called to the squad for the 2019 OFC Men's Olympic Qualifying Tournament from 21 September - 5 October 2019.
Caps and goals updated as of 27 September 2019 after the match against the Samoa.

No.	Pos.	Player	Date of birth (age)	Caps	Goals	Club
1	GK	Hengihengi Ikuvalu	2 December 2002 (age 23)	3	0	(Football Federation American Samoa) Vaiala Tongan
23	GK	Ken Uti	10 November 2000 (age 26)	1	0	(Football Federation American Samoa) PanSa East
2	DF	Milo Tiatia	18 February 2002 (age 24)	3	0	(Football Federation American Samoa) Royal Puma
3	DF	Mark Taga'i	28 March 2002 (age 24)	3	0	(Football Federation American Samoa) Ilaoa and To'omata
4	DF	Gabriel Taumua	13 April 2002 (age 24)	3	0	(Football Federation American Samoa) Pago Youth
5	DF	Walter Pati	31 March 2002 (age 24)	2	0	(Football Federation American Samoa) Royal Puma
13	DF	Joseph Peni Collins	20 February 2002 (age 24)	3	0	(Football Federation American Samoa) Pago Youth
15	DF	Afa Sione	22 June 2003 (age 23)	1	0	(Football Federation American Samoa) Pago Youth
17	DF	Gogo Poasa	7 December 2002 (age 23)	1	0	(Football Federation American Samoa) Vaiala Tongan
6	MF	Takai Pouli	19 July 2000 (age 26)	3	0	(Football Federation American Samoa) Vaiala Tongan
7	MF	Austin Kaleopa	14 August 2001 (age 25)	3	0	(Football Federation American Samoa) Utulei Youth
8	MF	Ueli Tualaulelei	27 August 1999 (age 27)	3	0	(Football Federation American Samoa) Pago Youth
10	MF	Michael Settle	3 December 2001 (age 24)	3	0	(United States Soccer Federation) Coronado Athletic Club
11	MF	Matthew Taga'i	28 March 2002 (age 24)	1	0	(Football Federation American Samoa) Ilaoa and To'omata
12	MF	Roy Ledoux	26 June 2000 (age 26)	3	0	(Football Federation American Samoa) Pago Youth
16	MF	Xavior Leatualevao	29 January 2004 (age 22)	0	0	(Football Federation American Samoa) Ilaoa and To'omata
9	FW	Chris Faamoana	2 August 2001 (age 25)	3	0	(Football Federation American Samoa) Vaiala Tongan
14	FW	James Settle	15 July 2003 (age 23)	3	0	(United States Soccer Federation) Coronado Athletic Club
18	FW	Mark Ashley Faulkner	2 February 2000 (age 26)	0	0	(Football Federation American Samoa) Ilaoa and To'omata

== List of coaches ==
- (Fiji) Rupeni Luvu (2012)
- (United States) Stephen Settle (2019)

== See also ==
- American Samoa national football team
- American Samoa national under-20 football team
- American Samoa national under-17 football team
- American Samoa women's national football team
