= Demetrius Beauchamp =

American Samoan soccer player (born 1991)

Personal information
- Full name: Demetrius Lamar Beauchamp
- Date of birth: November 11, 1991 (age 34)
- Place of birth: San Francisco, California, United States
- Height: 6 ft 3 in (1.91 m)
- Positions: Forward; midfielder

Youth career
- San Francisco Seals

College career
Years	Team	Apps	(Gls)
2011	Hawaii Pacific Sea Warriors	15	(1)
2012–2014	San Jose State Spartans	53	(4)

Senior career*
Years	Team	Apps	(Gls)
- San Francisco Seals

International career
2015–	American Samoa	5	(2)
- * Club domestic league appearances and goals

Demetrius Lamar Beauchamp (born November 11, 1991), also known as Frankie Beauchamp, is a soccer player who plays as a forward and midfielder. Born in the United States, he represents the American Samoan national team.

== College career ==
In 2011, Beauchamp attended Hawaii Pacific University, where he played for the Hawaii Pacific Sea Warriors in the NCAA Division II as a defender. There, he made 15 appearances as they won the Pacific West Conference. In 2012, he moved to San Jose State University to play for the San Jose State Spartans, making 15 appearances in his first year there. The following season, he scored three goals in 20 matches, as well as picking up six assists, the second most in the Western Athletic Conference. His final season saw him start in all 18 matches, scoring a penalty against the Bradley Braves.

== Club career ==
Beauchamp played for the San Francisco Seals, while the team were in the Premier Developmental League. In October 2010, he went on a two-week trial with Bundesliga club Werder Bremen.

== International career ==
Beauchamp made his debut for the American Samoan national team on 27 August 2015, in a 6–0 friendly defeat to Fiji. Three days later, he scored twice in a 3–2 defeat to Samoa during the first round of 2018 FIFA World Cup qualification, briefly becoming the country's all-time top goal scorer until Ramin Ott scored against Tonga on 2 September.

Following the team's elimination in 2018 FIFA World Cup qualification, he didn't return to the national team until 2024, playing in a 2–0 defeat against Samoa during the first round of 2026 FIFA World Cup qualification.

== Personal life ==
Beauchamp attended Gateway High School in San Francisco. Beauchamp's step-father, Shani Simpson, is a soccer manager, who coached him at the San Francisco Seals and later on the American Samoa national team in 2024.
