= Ali'i Mitchell =

American Samoan footballer (born 1994)

Personal information
- Full name: Ryan Aloali'i Mitchell
- Date of birth: August 12, 1994 (age 32)
- Position: Striker

Senior career*
Years	Team	Apps	(Gls)
2014	Middle Georgia Knights		
2015–2016	Ware County Gators		
2017	Middle Georgia Knights	17	(1)

International career^{‡}
2015–	American Samoa	7	(4)
- * Club domestic league appearances and goals ‡ National team caps and goals as of 22:00, March 25, 2026 (UTC)

Ryan Aloali'i Mitchell, also known as Ali'i Mitchell and Alo Mitchell, (born August 12, 1994) is an American Samoan footballer who plays as a striker for the American Samoa national team and he is their all time top goalscorer with four goals.

== Club career ==
Mitchell began playing soccer at age seven at his local YMCA. He joined Middle Georgia Knights in 2014 before moving to Ware County Gators in 2015. He rejoined Middle Georgia Knights in 2017 and scored once in seventeen appearances during the 2017 season. In subsequent years, he kept active playing in seven-a-side leagues in the Atlanta area.

== International career ==
Mitchell is eligible to represent American Samoa because his father was born in the territory. He reached out to the Football Federation American Samoa in 2014 and was invited to a training camp in Seattle the following year.

Mitchell debuted for American Samoa on 31 August 2015 in the 3–1 loss against Samoa during 2018 FIFA World Cup qualification. Also during 2018 FIFA World Cup qualification, he scored his first goal for American Samoa during the 2–0 victory against the Cook Islands on 4 September 2015.

He returned to the American Samoa national team in September 2024 for the 2026 FIFA World Cup qualification, and he played in the qualifying semi-final loss against Samoa before scoring in the following friendly against the Cook Islands on 9 September 2024.

He was called up to the American Samoa squad for the 2026 FIFA Series: Puerto Rico in March 2026, and he scored a brace during the 5–2 loss against the United States Virgin Islands on 25 March 2026 to become American Samoa's all time top goalscorer with four goals.

== Career statistics ==
=== International ===
As of match played 28 March 2026.

Appearances and goals by national team and year
National team	Year	Apps	Goals
American Samoa	2015	3	1
American Samoa	2024	2	1
American Samoa	2026	2	2
Total		7	4

Scores and results list American Samoa's goal tally first, score column indicates score after each Mitchell goal.

List of international goals scored by Ali'i Mitchell
No.	Date	Venue	Cap	Opponent	Score	Result	Competition	Ref.
1	4 September 2015	Loto-Tonga Soka Centre, Nukuʻalofa, Tonga	3	Cook Islands	1–0	2–0	2018 FIFA World Cup qualification	
2	9 September 2024	National Soccer Stadium, Apia, Samoa	5	Cook Islands	1–0	2–1	Friendly	
3	25 March 2026	Juan Ramón Loubriel Stadium, Bayamón, Puerto Rico	6	U.S. Virgin Islands	1–4	2–5	2026 FIFA Series	
4	25 March 2026	Juan Ramón Loubriel Stadium, Bayamón, Puerto Rico	6	U.S. Virgin Islands	2–4	2–5	2026 FIFA Series	

== Personal ==
Outside of football, Mitchell works as a medical dosimetrist creating treatment plans for cancer patients in the Atlanta area.

== See also ==
- List of top international men's football goalscorers by country
