= American Samoa national football team =

Men's national association football team

American Samoa
- Nickname: The Boys from the Territory
- Association: Football Federation American Samoa (FFAS)
- Confederation: OFC (Oceania)
- Head coach: Diego Gómez
- Captain: Justin Manao
- Most caps: Nicky Salapu (24)
- Top scorer: Ali'i Mitchell (4)
- Home stadium: Pago Park Soccer Stadium
- FIFA code: ASA
First colors	Second colors

FIFA ranking
- Current: 191 (November 18, 2026)
- Highest: 164 (October 2015)
- Lowest: 205 (May 2006)

First international
- Western Samoa 3–1 American Samoa (Apia, Western Samoa; August 20, 1983); FIFA recognized Tonga 3–0 American Samoa (Avarua, Cook Islands; September 2, 1998)

Biggest win
- Wallis and Futuna 0–3 American Samoa (Apia, Western Samoa; August 22, 1983); FIFA recognized American Samoa 2–0 Cook Islands (‘Atele, Tonga; September 4, 2015)

Biggest defeat
- Australia 31–0 American Samoa (Coffs Harbour, Australia; April 11, 2001) (World record for biggest defeat in senior international matches)

Pacific Games
- Appearances: 6 (first in 1983)
- Best result: Sixth place (1987)

Polynesia Cup
- Appearances: 3 (first in 1994)
- Best result: Fourth place (1994)

The American Samoa men's national football team (Samoan: Au soka Amerika Sāmoa) represents American Samoa in men's international association football and is controlled by the Football Federation American Samoa, the governing body of the sport in the territory. American Samoa's home ground is the Pago Park Soccer Stadium in Pago Pago.

== History ==
=== Early history ===
In 1983, American Samoa entered a football team in the South Pacific Games for the first time. The territory's official first match took place in Apia, Western Samoa on August 20, 1983, and ended in a 3–1 defeat to Western Samoa. Two days later, the team recorded their first win with a 3–0 victory against Wallis & Futuna however, they were eliminated from the competition at the group stage following a 3–2 loss to Tonga on August 24.

The following year, the American Samoa Football Association (ASFA) – now known as Football Federation American Samoa (FFAS) – was founded and took over responsibility for organizing the territory's national team.

After competing in the 1987 South Pacific Games and the 1994 Polynesia Cup, ASFA became full members of the Oceania Football Confederation (OFC) and the Fédération Internationale de Football Association (FIFA) allowing them to compete in the FIFA World Cup qualifiers for the first time. American Samoa registered their first FIFA-recognized international during the 1998 Polynesia Cup in Rarotonga, Cook Islands when they lost 3–0 to Tonga on September 2.

==== World record for the worst loss in international matches ====
During their first qualifying campaign for the 2002 FIFA World Cup in April 2001, American Samoa was involved in a match which set the record for the largest margin of victory in international football when they lost 31–0 to Australia. The outcome of the match led to debates about the format of qualification tournaments, with the Australian manager Frank Farina and striker Archie Thompson – who scored 13 times in the match – feeling that preliminary rounds should be introduced to avoid such unbalanced matches, views shared by the international footballing body FIFA. It eventually led to the introduction of a preliminary round in the Oceanian zone qualification for the 2006 FIFA World Cup.

=== Stagnation ===
Since joining FIFA, the team has been regarded as one of the world's weakest teams and were, until November 2011, the joint-lowest ranked national team in the FIFA World ranking.

On November 23, 2011, American Samoa recorded their second and first FIFA-recognized win when they defeated Tonga 2–1 in the first round of qualifiers for the 2014 FIFA World Cup. It was also the team's 1st victory after 38 consecutive defeats.

The team's efforts to qualify for the 2014 FIFA World Cup were chronicled in a 2014 British documentary, Next Goal Wins, directed by Mike Brett and Steve Jamison. In October 2015, the territory achieved its highest position in the FIFA World Rankings when they reached 164th following back-to-back wins against Tonga and the Cook Islands in qualifying for the 2018 FIFA World Cup.

After playing in the 2019 Pacific Games, the team went over four years without playing an international match. This hiatus was caused in part by the COVID-19 pandemic which forced the cancellation of the 2020 OFC Nations Cup and led the team to withdraw from 2022 FIFA World Cup qualification. American Samoa was removed from the FIFA World Rankings in July 2023, due to going 5 years without playing an official match. American Samoa finally competed again at the 2023 Pacific Games.

==== Player pool ====
American Samoa has struggled in part because of its small player pool. The territory has a small population, and many potential players move away for education or work or choose to play other sports such as baseball. Another limiting factor is that international competition regulations often require that players hold the nationality of the country that they represent, which in the case of American Samoa is United States nationality. Although people born in American Samoa are United States nationals, foreign nationals who immigrate to American Samoa, who comprise about a third of its population, are ineligible to apply for United States nationality. An option for the team would be to recruit players from the United States, as other teams of Pacific territories have done with their parent countries, such as Tahiti drawing players from Metropolitan France.

==== 2026 FIFA Series ====
The men's competition of the 2026 FIFA Series was split into nine different sections hosted across eight countries. In November 2025, FIFA announced that Puerto Rico would host one such section in Bayamón, in which Guam, the U.S. Virgin Islands and American Samoa would also compete. The Puerto Rican section of the tournament was held in a four-match format (semi-finals, third-place match and final) in late March 2026. American Samoa finished fourth and last in the section after losing against the U.S. Virgin Islands and Guam in the semi-final and third-place match, respectively.

== Team image ==
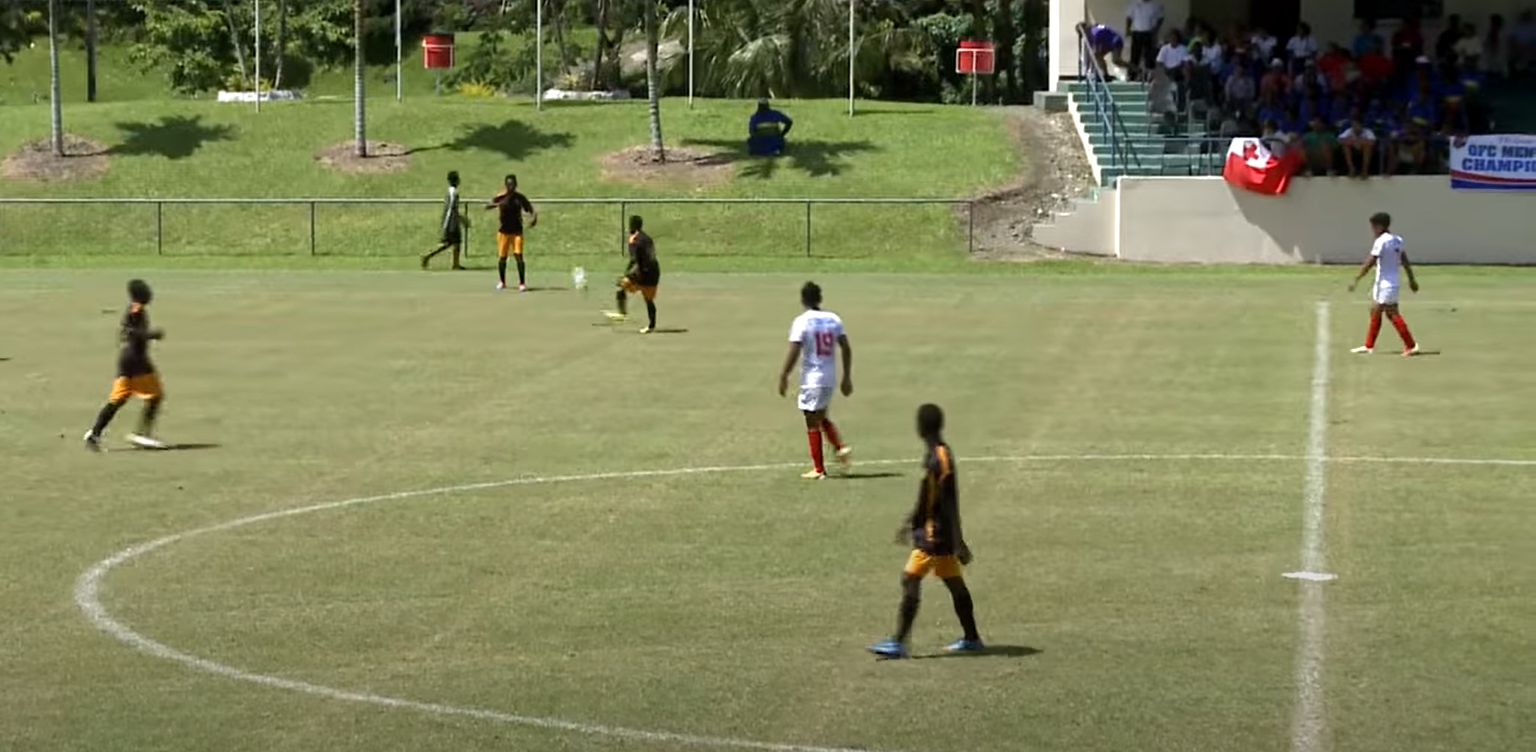
Pago Park Soccer Stadium

=== Home stadium ===
American Samoa's home ground is the Pago Park Soccer Stadium, however American Samoa have never played there in their history at senior level. The stadium featured in the 2023 film Next Goal Wins and was used as the national team's training ground in the build-up to the 2011 Pacific Games and the 2014 FIFA World Cup qualifiers. Matches at the stadium must be concluded before 6:30pm because of a village curfew which limits noise and prevents the installation of floodlights. For this reason, the association began planning to build a new facility in Tafuna in 2023. FIFA president Gianni Infantino promised the association $5 million for the project during his visit around Oceania in summer of that year.

== Results and fixtures ==
=== 2026 ===
March 25 2026 FIFA Series	U.S. Virgin Islands	5–2	American Samoa	Bayamón, Puerto Rico
16:00 UTC−4	J. Ramos 7'; Penders 19', 20'; Liburd 53'; Robinson (red card) 79'; St. Louis 90+2' (pen.)	Report	Mitchell 80' (pen.), 82'	Stadium: Juan Ramón Loubriel Stadium; Referee: José Torres (Puerto Rico)

March 28 2026 FIFA Series	American Samoa	0–6	Guam	Bayamón, Puerto Rico
16:00 UTC−4		Report	Mitchell 3' (o.g.); Berg 13', 35'; Ochoa 39' (pen.); Taitague 57'; Gomez 86'	Stadium: Juan Ramón Loubriel Stadium; Referee: José Torres (Puerto Rico)

== Coaching staff ==
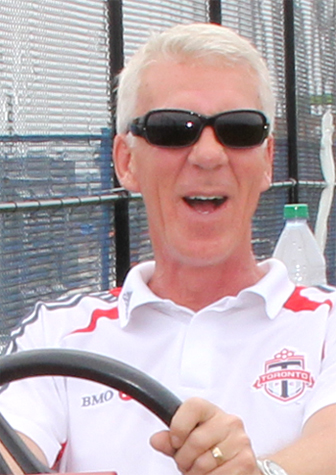
Thomas Rongen became the manager of the national football team of American Samoa

As of January 18, 2025

Position	Name
Head coach	(Spain) Diego Gómez
Coach	(Spain) Sergio Torán
Analyst	(Spain) Sergio Redondo
Athletic trainer	(Spain) David Viton
Fitness coach	(Spain) David Viton
Goalkeeper coach	(American Samoa) Nicky Salapu

=== Coaching history ===
- (American Samoa) Tiwo Kummings (2000)
- (American Samoa) Anthony Langkilde (2001)
- (American Samoa) Tunoa Lui (2001–2002)
- (England) Ian Crook (2004)
- (American Samoa) Nathan Mease (2007)
- (England) David Brand (2007–2010)
- (American Samoa) Iofi Lalogafuafua (2011)
- (Netherlands) Thomas Rongen (2011)
- (American Samoa) Larry Mana'o (2015–2019)
- (American Samoa) Tunoa Lui (2019–2023)
- (American Samoa) Ruben Luvu (2023–2024)
- (England) David Jones (2024)
- (Netherlands) Thomas Rongen (2024)
- (American Samoa) Shani Simpson (2024)
- (Spain) Diego Gómez (2026–)

== Players ==
=== Current squad ===
The following players were called up for the 2026 FIFA Series.

Caps and goals updated as of 9 April 2026, after the game against the Guam.

No.	Pos.	Player	Date of birth (age)	Caps	Goals	Club
1	GK	Kai Yandall	25 July 2008 (age 18)	1	0	(United States Soccer Federation) Nashville SC
20	GK	Nicholas Tuiasosopo		1	0	
23	GK	Nicky Salapu	13 September 1980 (age 46)	24	0	(American Samoa) PanSa East F.C.
2	DF	Vaha Tua	6 November 2002 (age 24)	4	0	(Football Federation American Samoa) Vaiala Tonga SC
4	DF	Ben Stefanon	20 November 2004 (age 22)	4	1	(United States Soccer Federation) Christopher Newport Captains
5	DF	Austin Kaleopa	24 November 2001 (age 24)	9	0	(Football Federation American Samoa) Utulei Youth
15	DF	Matthew Stefanon		0	0	
18	DF	Malachi Drago		2	0	
19	DF	Dylan Salapu	31 August 2008 (age 18)	1	0	(United States Soccer Federation) Pierce Raiders
7	MF	Peter Lauvao	11 December 2003 (age 22)	3	0	(Football Federation American Samoa) Vaiala Tonga SC
8	MF	Ali'i Mitchell	12 August 1994 (age 32)	7	4	
9	MF	Johnica Collins	12 January 2006 (age 20)	2	0	(Football Federation American Samoa) Pago Youth FC
12	MF	Leaga Lealuga	27 June 2005 (age 21)	5	1	(Football Federation American Samoa) PanSa East F.C.
13	MF	Billjae Vaitoelau	13 April 2002 (age 24)	6	1	(Football Federation American Samoa) Royal Puma
14	MF	Kenai Mauga		1	0	(United States Soccer Federation) Indialantic Force
16	MF	Michael Paselio	27 October 2001 (age 25)	0	0	(United States Soccer Federation) Temecula
22	MF	Michael Settle	3 December 2001 (age 24)	4	0	(Football Federation American Samoa) Pago Youth FC
6	FW	Tor Lawrence Mana'o	27 May 1999 (age 27)	5	0	
10	FW	Daniel Lee	17 February 2007 (age 19)	5	0	(Football Federation American Samoa) Royal Puma
11	FW	Fiamatai Itamua	27 May 2007 (age 19)	2	0	(Football Federation American Samoa) Pago Youth FC
17	FW	Petu Pouli	18 December 2005 (age 20)	8	0	(Football Federation American Samoa) Vaiala Tonga SC

== Player records ==
Goalkeeper Nicky Salapu holds the record for the most appearances for American Samoa. Since his debut against Fiji on April 7, 2001, he has made 24 appearances for the national team – including the world record defeat to Australia and American Samoa's first FIFA-recognized victory against Tonga in November 2011. Ramin Ott holds the record for most goals for American Samoa after scoring three times in 15 appearances between 2004 and 2015. In total, 10 different players have scored a goal in a FIFA-recognized match for American Samoa.

As of September 9, 2024.

=== Most appearances ===
Rank	Name	Caps	Goals	Position	Career
1	Nicky Salapu	24	0	GK	2001–2024
2	Uasi Heleta	16	0	DF	2004–2019
3	Ramin Ott	15	3	FW	2004–2015
4	Jaiyah Saelua	14	0	DF	2004–2019
5	Travis Pita Sinapati	12	0	DF	2001–2007
6	Roy Ledoux	9	0	DF	2018–present
6	Justin Mana'o	9	2	MF	2011–present
6	Natia Natia	9	1	MF	2004–2011
9	Austin Kaleopa	8	0	MF	2019–present
9	Maika Molesi	8	0	DF	2004–2007
9	Ryan Samuelu	8	0	DF	2015–2019
9	Pesamino Victor	8	0	DF	2007–2011

Youngest player

- Jaiyah Saelua – 15 years 300 days vs. Fiji on 15 May 2004

Oldest player

- Nicky Salapu – 43 years 359 days vs. Samoa on 6 September 2024

=== Top goalscorers ===
Rank	Name	Goals	Caps	Average	Career
1	Ali'i Mitchell	4	7	1.17	2015–present
2	Ramin Ott	3	15	0.2	2004–2015
3	Demetrius Beauchamp	2	5	0.25	2015–present
3	Justin Mana'o	2	9	0.22	2011–present
3	Shalom Luani	2	8	0.25	2011

First goal

- Duane Atuelevao – 12 March 2002 vs. Tonga

Most goals in a match

- Demetrius Beauchamp – 2 vs. Samoa on 31 August 2015
- Ali'i Mitchell – 2 vs. United States Virgin Islands on 25 March 2026

== Team records ==
- Biggest victory: 3–0 vs. Wallis and Futuna on 22 August 1983
- Heaviest defeat: 0–31 vs. Australia on 11 April 2001
- Most consecutive victories: 2; achieved September 2015
- Most consecutive matches without defeats: 2; achieved November 2011 and September 2015
- Most consecutive matches without victory: 37 between 24 August 1983 and 5 September 2011
- Most consecutive matches without scoring: 7 between 27 August 2007 and 5 September 2011

== Competitive record ==
=== FIFA World Cup ===
Following FIFA affiliation in 1998, American Samoa first entered the qualifying competition for the 2002 FIFA World Cup. They have entered the qualifiers for each subsequent edition but have never made it beyond the first stage. The closest they came to reaching the second phase was in qualifying for the 2018 edition when they won two of their three matches and narrowly missed out on progressing on goal difference.

FIFA World Cup									Qualification							
Year	Host	Round	Pld	W	D	L	F	A	Pos.	Pld	W	D	L	F	A	Source
1930 to 1998		Not a FIFA member							Not a FIFA member							
2002	Japan; South Korea	Did not qualify							Group – 5th	4	0	0	4	0	57	
2006	Germany	Did not qualify							First round group – 5th	4	0	0	4	1	34	
2010	South Africa	Did not qualify							First round group – 5th	4	0	0	4	1	38	
2014	Brazil	Did not qualify							First round group – 3rd	3	1	1	1	3	3	
2018	Russia	Did not qualify							First round group – 2nd	3	2	0	1	6	4	
2022	Qatar	Withdrew							Withdrew							
2026	Canada; Mexico; United States	Did not qualify							First round	1	0	0	1	0	2	
2030	Morocco; Portugal; Spain															
2034	Saudi Arabia															
Total			0	0	0	0	0	0	0/6	19	3	1	15	11	138	—

Notes

1. A: The Oceanian qualifiers for the 2006 FIFA World Cup doubled as qualifiers for the 2004 OFC Nations Cup.
2. B: The men's football tournament at the 2007 South Pacific Games doubled as qualifiers for the 2008 OFC Nations Cup and the first round of qualifiers for the 2010 FIFA World Cup.
3. C: The Oceanian qualifiers for the 2014 FIFA World Cup doubled as qualifiers for the 2012 OFC Nations Cup.
4. D: The Oceanian qualifiers for the 2018 FIFA World Cup doubled as qualifiers for the 2016 OFC Nations Cup.

=== OFC Nations Cup ===
Before becoming full members of OFC in 1998, American Samoa entered the 1994 Polynesia Cup which acted as the qualifying round for Polynesian national teams for the 1996 OFC Nations Cup. This was the territory's first time competing for a place in OFC's flagship competition for senior men's national teams.

The OFC Men's Nations Cup has often acted as part of the FIFA World Cup qualification process for Oceanian national teams and, as a result, American Samoa have competed in the qualifiers for both competitions in every edition since 1998. They have yet to qualify for either competition.

Oceania Cup / OFC Nations Cup									Qualification record							
Year	Host	Round	Pld	W	D	L	GF	GA	Pos.	Pld	W	D	L	GF	GA	Source
1973	New Zealand	Did not enter							Did not enter							
1980	New Caledonia	Did not enter							Did not enter							
1996	—N/a	Did not qualify							4th	3	0	0	3	3	7	
1998	Australia	Did not qualify							5th	4	0	0	4	3	23	
2000	Tahiti	Did not qualify							5th	4	0	0	4	2	29	
2002	New Zealand	Did not qualify							5th	4	0	0	4	2	29	
2004	Australia	Did not qualify							5th	4	0	0	4	1	34	
2008	—N/a	Did not qualify							5th	4	0	0	4	1	38	
2012	Solomon Islands	Did not qualify							3rd	3	1	1	1	3	3	
2016	Papua New Guinea	Did not qualify							2nd	3	2	0	1	6	4	
2024	Fiji; Vanuatu	Did not enter							Did not enter							
Total			0	0	0	0	0	0		29	3	1	25	21	167	—

Notes

1. E: There was no fixed host for the 1996 OFC Nations Cup or the 2008 OFC Nations Cup.
2. F: The 1994 Polynesia Cup doubled as qualifiers for the 1996 OFC Nations Cup.
3. G: The 1998 Polynesia Cup doubled as qualifiers for the 1998 OFC Nations Cup.
4. H: The 2000 Polynesia Cup doubled as qualifiers for the 2000 OFC Nations Cup.
5. I: The Oceanian qualifiers for the 2006 FIFA World Cup doubled as qualifiers for the 2004 OFC Nations Cup.
6. J: The men's football tournament at the 2007 South Pacific Games doubled as qualifiers for the 2008 OFC Nations Cup and the first round of qualifiers for the 2010 FIFA World Cup.
7. K: The Oceanian qualifiers for the 2014 FIFA World Cup doubled as qualifiers for the 2012 OFC Nations Cup.
8. L: The Oceanian qualifiers for the 2018 FIFA World Cup doubled as qualifiers for the 2016 OFC Nations Cup.

=== Pacific Games ===
American Samoa first entered the South Pacific Games in 1983. This was the first time a team representing the territory had competed in association football and they recorded one win from their three games in the group stage by beating Wallis and Futuna 3–0 – the only time American Samoa have recorded a win in the competition – but that wasn't enough to progress to the next round. American Samoa would go onto enter the 1987 edition where they were again eliminated in the group stage, losing all four of their matches.

It would be another 20 years before they again entered the competition. The 2007 edition was the last known as the South Pacific Games before becoming the Pacific Games four years later and it was also part of the qualification process for the 2010 FIFA World Cup. In their third appearance in the competition, American Samoa were again eliminated at the group stage, losing all four matches. The same fate befell American Samoa in the 2011 Pacific Games as they lost all five games to finish bottom of their group.

In 2015, the Pacific Games was an age-restricted tournament that doubled as the OFC Men's Olympic Qualifying Tournament and no team representing American Samoa took part. Four years later, they were again eliminated at the group stage however, a 1–1 draw with Tuvalu ended a 32-year losing streak in the competition.

Pacific Games
Year	Host	Round	Pld	W	D	L	F	A	Source
1963 to 1979		Did not enter							
1983	Western Samoa	Group stage	3	1	0	2	6	6	
1987	New Caledonia	Group stage	4	0	0	4	1	42	
1991 to 2003		Did not enter							
2007	Samoa	Group stage	4	0	0	4	1	38	
2011	New Caledonia	Group stage	5	0	0	5	0	26	
2015	Papua New Guinea	Did not enter							
2019	Samoa	Group stage	5	0	1	4	2	36	
2023	Solomon Islands	Group stage	4	0	0	4	2	31	
Total			25	1	1	23	12	179	

Notes

1. M: The men's football tournament at the 2007 South Pacific Games doubled as qualifiers for the 2008 OFC Nations Cup and the first round of qualifiers for the 2010 FIFA World Cup.
2. N: The men's football tournament at the 2015 Pacific Games was an age-restricted competition that doubled as the OFC Men's Olympic Qualifying Tournament.

== Records and statistics ==
American Samoa played their first full international match against Papua New Guinea, which ended in a 20–0 loss. Their national team have suffered the world's biggest international defeat, by losing to Australia 31–0. American Samoa have won only against Cook Islands, Tonga, and Wallis and Futuna. American Samoa have also lost to all of these teams at least once.

=== Head-to-head record ===
The following table shows the American Samoa national football team's all-time international record. The statistics are composed of FIFA World Cup, OFC Nations Cup, Polynesia Cup and Pacific Games matches, as well as international friendlies.

Team	Pld	W	D	L	GF	GA	GD	WPCT
Australia	1	0	0	1	0	31	−31	0.00
Cook Islands	5	2	1	2	8	9	−1	40.00
Fiji	4	0	0	4	0	39	−39	0.00
Guam	2	0	0	2	0	8	−8	0.00
Northern Mariana Islands	1	0	0	1	0	4	−4	0.00
New Caledonia	4	0	0	4	0	33	−33	0.00
Papua New Guinea	3	0	0	3	0	37	−37	0.00
Samoa (Note: Includes results as Western Samoa.)	12	0	0	12	5	56	−51	0.00
Solomon Islands	4	0	0	4	1	40	−39	0.00
Tahiti	4	0	0	4	2	40	−38	0.00
Tonga	10	2	0	8	12	34	−22	20.00
Tuvalu	2	0	1	1	1	5	−4	0.00
U.S. Virgin Islands	1	0	0	1	2	5	−3	0.00
Vanuatu	4	0	0	4	1	39	−38	0.00
Wallis and Futuna	2	1	0	1	4	5	−1	50.00
Total	59	5	2	52	36	385	−349	8.47

Source: Results

=== Performance by competition ===
Competition	Pld	W	D	L	GF	GA	GD	WPCT
FIFA World Cup qualification	19	3	1	15	11	138	−127	15.79
OFC Nations Cup qualification	29	3	1	25	21	167	−146	10.34
Polynesia Cup	11	0	0	11	8	59	−51	0.00
Pacific Games	25	1	1	23	12	179	−167	4.00

Competition	Pld	W	D	L	GF	GA	GD	WPCT
Competitive	55	4	2	49	32	367	−335	7.27
Friendlies	2	1	0	1	2	7	−5	50.00
Total	57	5	2	50	34	374	−340	8.77

Notes

1. N: A number of matches in the Polynesia Cup and the Pacific Games doubled as qualifiers for the ONC Nations Cup and the FIFA World Cup. For full details, see American Samoa national football team results.

=== Performance by venue ===
Venue	Pld	W	D	L	GF	GA	GD	WPCT
Home	0	0	0	0	0	0	0	—
Away	1	0	0	1	0	6	−6	0.00
Neutral	56	5	2	49	34	368	−334	8.93
Total	57	5	2	50	34	374	−340	8.77

== Historical kits ==
2000 Home	2004 Home	2004 Away	2007 Home	2007 Away	2011 Home	2011 Home	2011 Away

2011 Away	2011 Home	2011 Away	2015 Home	2015 Away	2019 Home	2019 Away	2019 Third

2023 Home	2023 Away

== See also ==
- American Samoa national under-23 football team
- American Samoa national under-20 football team
- American Samoa national under-17 football team
- American Samoa women's national football team
- American Samoa women's national under-17 football team
