= 2014 FIFA World Cup qualification – OFC first round =

This page provides the summaries of the Oceania Football Confederation first round matches for 2014 FIFA World Cup qualification.

== Format ==
In this round the four lowest ranked entrants played a single round-robin tournament from 22 to 26 November 2011, held in Apia, Samoa.

The winner advanced to the 2012 OFC Nations Cup, scheduled for the Solomon Islands from 1–12 June 2012, to join the other seven teams which received a bye into the second round. The Nations Cup served as the second round of qualifying for the 2014 FIFA World Cup in Brazil.

The qualification event was to be the football competition at the 2011 Pacific Games in Nouméa, New Caledonia. However, in June 2011, the format was amended, and the Pacific Games are no longer be part of the qualification process.

== Participating teams ==
The July 2011 FIFA World ranking, as well as other "sporting considerations", was used to determine the teams that participated in the first round.

- American Samoa
- Cook Islands
- Samoa
- Tonga

== Venues ==
All matches were held at the National Soccer Stadium of Samoa in Apia

National Soccer Stadium
Apia, Samoa
13°50′12″S 171°45′7″W
Capacity: 3,500

== Matches ==
Pos	Team	Pld	W	D	L	GF	GA	GD	Pts	Qualification	Samoa national football team	Tonga national football team	American Samoa national football team	Cook Islands national football team
1	Samoa	3	2	1	0	5	3	+2	7	Qualified for the 2012 OFC Nations Cup	—	1–1	1–0	—
2	Tonga	3	1	1	1	4	4	0	4		—	—	—	2–1
3	American Samoa	3	1	1	1	3	3	0	4		—	2–1	—	1–1
4	Cook Islands	3	0	1	2	4	6	−2	1		2–3	—	—	—

22 November 2011
15:00 UTC−10

American Samoa	2–1	Tonga
Ott 43'; Luani 74'	Report	Feao 88'

National Soccer Stadium, Apia
Attendance: 150
Referee: Andrew Achari (Fiji)
22 November 2011
17:30 UTC−10

Cook Islands	2–3	Samoa
Best 35', 84'	Report	Gosche 19', 36'; Bell 90+1'

National Soccer Stadium, Apia
Attendance: 600
Referee: Peter O'Leary (New Zealand)

24 November 2011
15:00 UTC−10

American Samoa	1–1	Cook Islands
Luani 24'	Report	Luvu 62' (o.g.)

National Soccer Stadium, Apia
Attendance: 300
Referee: Bruce George (Vanuatu)
24 November 2011
17:30 UTC−10

Samoa	1–1	Tonga
Easthope 43' (pen.)	Report	Taufahema 81'

National Soccer Stadium, Apia
Attendance: 180
Referee: Averii Jacques (Tahiti)

26 November 2011
15:00 UTC−10 (Note: Order of matches of final day amended from original schedule.)

Tonga	2–1	Cook Islands
Maamaaloa 26'; Falatau 90'	Report	Harmon 35'

National Soccer Stadium, Apia
Attendance: 200
Referee: Isidore Assiene-Ambassa (New Caledonia)
26 November 2011
17:30 UTC−10

Samoa	1–0	American Samoa
Malo 89'	Report

National Soccer Stadium, Apia
Attendance: 800
Referee: Peter O'Leary (New Zealand)

== Goalscorers ==
There were 16 goals scored in 6 matches, for an average of 2.67 goals per match.

2 goals

- (American Samoa) Shalom Luani
- (Cook Islands) Campbell Best
- (Samoa) Luki Gosche

1 goal

- (American Samoa) Ramin Ott
- (Cook Islands) Grover Harmon
- (Samoa) Albert Bell
- (Samoa) Shaun Easthope
- (Samoa) Silao Malo
- (Tonga) Unaloto Feao
- (Tonga) Kinitoni Falatau
- (Tonga) Timote Maamaaloa
- (Tonga) Lokoua Taufahema

1 own goal

- (American Samoa) Tala Luvu (against Cook Islands)
