= Next Goal Wins (2014 film) =

2014 British documentary film

- British theatrical release poster
- Directed by: Mike Brett; Steve Jamison
- Produced by: Kristian Brodie
- Cinematography: Mike Brett and Steve Jamison
- Edited by: Julian Quantrill
- Music by: Roger Goula
- Production companies: Archer's Mark; Agile Films; K5 International
- Distributed by: Icon Film Distribution
- Release dates: 19 April 2014 (Tribeca); 9 May 2014 (UK)
- Running time: 97 minutes
- Country: United Kingdom
- Languages: English; Samoan

Next Goal Wins is a 2014 British documentary film directed by Mike Brett and Steve Jamison. The film chronicles the national football team of American Samoa as they try to recover from the indignity of being known as one of the weakest football teams in the world, and to qualify for the 2014 FIFA World Cup.

== Synopsis ==
In 2001, American Samoa lost 31–0 to Australia, the worst loss in international football history, and have been dogged by defeat ever since. They want to qualify for the 2014 FIFA World Cup, but continue to lose on the pitch. To help turn their luck around, the Football Federation American Samoa hire Dutch-born, America-based coach Thomas Rongen.

Over the next three weeks, Rongen trains the team, and introduces some players based overseas, until they can acquit themselves with pride at the qualifiers at the OFC World Cup Qualification.

Jaiyah Saelua, a member of the squad since 2003, is a faʻafafine and is the first transgender player to compete in a FIFA World Cup qualifier.

== Production ==
The American Samoa football team had refused permission to numerous film and TV crews before being approached by Brett and Jamison, the directors were given permission to film the team because they aimed to celebrate the fact that the team continued to play in the face of their defeats. The film was shot on 5k resolution using a RED Epic camera over two visits to the island of six and eight weeks respectively.

== Release ==
The film had its premiere at the Tribeca Film Festival on 19 April 2014. It was released in the United Kingdom on 9 May.

== Critical response ==
Next Goal Wins received overwhelmingly positive reviews from both critics and audiences. The review aggregator website Rotten Tomatoes gives it a 100% approval rating based on 31 reviews, with a rating average of 7.6/10. The website's critics consensus reads: "Finding beauty in sports beyond the mere satisfaction on winning, Next Goal Wins is a moving documentary filled with a lovable array of underdogs". On Metacritic, the film has a score of 71 out of 100, based on reviews by 10 critics, indicating "generally favorable reviews".

In the UK, the film was admired by those who loved football and those who did not. Representing the latter, Mark Kermode reviewed the film twice. In The Observer he gave Next Goal Wins four stars out of five and wrote that "whether or not you give two hoots about "the beautiful game" (and I don't), this charming and uplifting documentary will have you cheering for the underdogs and wishing that all footballers were this humble, determined and just plain decent." While on his film review programme with Simon Mayo on BBC Radio 5 Live he admitted that the film made him both cry and punch the air. In the New Statesman, Arsenal fan Mark Lawson called Next Goal Wins, "one of the best films about football", because it will appeal to football fans and the football indifferent alike.

Across the rest of the world the coverage was also positive. In The New York Times Anita Gates called the film "splendid celebration-of-humanity documentary" comparing its best moments to an Edith Wharton novel. A number of reviewers remarked that interest in soccer or even sport was not necessary to enjoy the film. Despite their largely positive reviews, Liam Lacey in The Globe and Mail noted that the film was predictable and in the Los Angeles Times Sheri Linden wrote that there is nothing exceptional about the film cinematically.

== Awards ==
Next Goal Wins won the Special Jury Award as part of the Documentary Film Competition at the 2014 Abu Dhabi Film Festival and was also nominated for a Black Pearl Award for Best Documentary Feature at the same festival. The same year it won the Best Documentary award at the British Independent Film Awards. In 2015 the film was nominated for Documentary of the Year at the London Critics Circle Film Awards 2015.

== Feature film adaptation ==
In August 2019, Variety reported that director Taika Waititi would oversee a feature film adaption of Next Goal Wins for The Walt Disney Company under their Searchlight Pictures banner. Waititi co-wrote the script with Iain Morris. Garrett Basch, Jonathan Cavendish, Andy Serkis, Mike Brett, and Steve Jamison served as producers. The production was a joint venture between Searchlight Pictures and The Imaginarium. Principal photography began in late 2019. Michael Fassbender was announced to star in the film adaption in the role of Thomas Rongen. The film was released on November 17, 2023.

== See also ==
- List of association football films
