= 2020 Turkish Women's Cup squads =

List of players competing at the 4th edition of the Turkish Women's Cup

This article lists the squads for the 2020 Turkish Women's Cup, the 4th edition of the Turkish Women's Cup. The cup consisted of a series of friendly games, and was held in Turkey from 4 to 10 March 2020. The eight national teams and one domestic team involved in the tournament registered a squad of 23 players.

The age listed for each player is on 4 March 2020, the first day of the tournament. The numbers of caps and goals listed for each player do not include any matches played after the start of tournament. The club listed is the club for which the player last played a competitive match prior to the tournament. The nationality for each club reflects the national association (not the league) to which the club is affiliated. A flag is included for coaches that are of a different nationality than their own national team.

== Squads ==
=== Belarus ===
Coach: Yury Maleyew

Belarus played only one match against Romania. This was their squad.

No.	Pos.	Player	Date of birth (age)	Club
1	GK	Natalia Voskobovich	25 October 1993 (aged 26)	(Football Federation of Belarus) Minsk
3	FW	Anastasia Linnik	11 July 1993 (aged 26)	(Football Federation of Belarus) Minsk
4	MF	Anastasiya Shlapakova	6 March 2000 (aged 19)	(Football Federation of Belarus) Isloch-RGUOR
5	MF	Anastasia Shcherbachenia (captain)	9 January 1990 (aged 30)	(Estonian Football Association) Pärnu
6	DF	Anastasiya Novikova	10 December 1998 (aged 21)	(Football Federation of Belarus) Isloch-RGUOR
8	FW	Viktoriya Kazakevich	12 May 1998 (aged 21)	(Football Federation of Belarus) Isloch-RGUOR
9	DF	Anna Kozyupa	7 March 1995 (aged 24)	(Football Federation of Belarus) Minsk
10	MF	Tatiana Krasnova	27 June 1995 (aged 24)	(Football Federation of Belarus) Bobruichanka
11	MF	Yulia Slesarchik	25 August 1994 (aged 25)	(Football Federation of Belarus) Isloch-RGUOR
12	GK	Ekaterina Kovalchuk	20 December 1990 (aged 29)	(Football Federation of Belarus) Minsk
13	FW	Anastasiya Kharlanova	22 October 1992 (aged 27)	(Football Federation of Belarus) Minsk
14	FW	Karina Olkhovik	17 June 2000 (aged 19)	(Football Federation of Belarus) Isloch-RGUOR
15	MF	Anastasia Shuppo	15 November 1997 (aged 22)	(Football Federation of Belarus) Minsk
18	MF	Vita Nikolaenko	4 September 1995 (aged 24)	(Football Federation of Belarus) Zorka-BDU
21	MF	Darya Stezhko	17 February 1998 (aged 22)	(Football Federation of Belarus) Zorka-BDU
23	FW	Anna Pilipenko	25 December 1998 (aged 21)	(Lithuanian Football Federation) Gintra Universitetas
	DF	Ekaterina Dudko	18 October 1991 (aged 28)	(Football Federation of Belarus) Neman
	DF	Valeria Karachun	14 April 1994 (aged 25)	(Football Federation of Belarus) Isloch-RGUOR
	DF	Ksenia Kubichnaya	6 March 1999 (aged 20)	(Football Federation of Belarus) Minsk
	FW	Anastasia Popova	4 October 1990 (aged 29)	(Football Federation of Belarus) Minsk
	GK	Mariya Svidunovich	20 May 2000 (aged 19)	(Football Federation of Belarus) Isloch-RGUOR
	FW	Viktoria Tikhon	4 September 2001 (aged 18)	(Football Federation of Belarus) Minsk

=== Chile ===
Coach: José Letelier

The squad was announced on 26 February 2020.

No.	Pos.	Player	Date of birth (age)	Caps	Goals	Club
	FW	Yanara Aedo	5 August 1993 (aged 26)	62	11	(Royal Spanish Football Federation) Sevilla
	MF	Karen Araya	16 October 1990 (aged 29)	56	5	(Football Federation of Chile) Santiago Morning
	GK	Natalia Campos	12 January 1992 (aged 28)	9	0	(Royal Spanish Football Federation) Fundación Albacete
	GK	Christiane Endler (captain)	23 July 1991 (aged 28)	71	0	(French Football Federation) Paris Saint-Germain
	DF	Su Helen Galaz	27 May 1991 (aged 28)	36	0	(Football Federation of Chile) Santiago Morning
	DF	Carla Guerrero	23 December 1987 (aged 32)	64	5	(Royal Spanish Football Federation) Rayo Vallecano
	MF	Nayadet López	5 August 1994 (aged 25)	3	0	(Royal Spanish Football Federation) Santa Teresa
	MF	Yessenia López	20 October 1990 (aged 29)	33	3	(Football Federation of Chile) Universidad de Chile
	MF	Francisca Mardones	24 March 1989 (aged 30)	7	1	(Football Federation of Chile) Santiago Morning
	DF	Bárbara Muñoz	2 January 1992 (aged 28)	11	0	(Football Federation of Chile) Santiago Morning
	MF	Daniela Pardo	5 September 1988 (aged 31)	27	2	(Football Federation of Chile) Santiago Morning
	DF	Fernanda Pinilla	6 November 1993 (aged 26)	19	0	(Royal Spanish Football Federation) Santa Teresa
	FW	Javiera Roa	27 February 1995 (aged 25)	3	0	(Football Federation of Chile) Santiago Morning
	DF	Camila Sáez	17 October 1994 (aged 25)	56	6	(Royal Spanish Football Federation) Rayo Vallecano
	DF	Ámbar Soruco	3 March 1996 (aged 24)	5	1	(Football Federation of Chile) Santiago Morning
	DF	Rocío Soto	21 September 1993 (aged 26)	36	1	(Football Federation of Chile) Santiago Morning
	DF	Javiera Toro	22 April 1998 (aged 21)	10	0	(Football Federation of Chile) Colo-Colo
	FW	Yazmín Torrealba	28 May 1992 (aged 27)	5	1	(Football Federation of Chile) Colo-Colo
	GK	Ryann Torrero	1 September 1990 (aged 29)	0	0	(Football Federation of Chile) Santiago Morning
	FW	María José Urrutia	17 December 1993 (aged 26)	17	2	(Football Federation of Chile) Palestino
	FW	Daniela Zamora	13 November 1990 (aged 29)	42	6	(Football Federation of Chile) Universidad de Chile

=== Ghana ===
Coach: Mercy Tagoe

The squad was announced on 29 February 2020.

No.	Pos.	Player	Date of birth (age)	Club
	MF	Juliet Acheampong	11 July 1991 (aged 28)	(Ghana Football Association) Prisons
	GK	Azume Adams	28 December 1997 (aged 22)	(Ghana Football Association) Prisons
	MF	Elizabeth Addo	1 September 1993 (aged 26)	(Chinese Football Association) Jiangsu Suning
	FW	Princella Adubea	27 December 1998 (aged 21)	(Royal Spanish Football Federation) Sporting Huelva
	DF	Gladys Amfobea	1 July 1998 (aged 21)	(Ghana Football Association) Lady Strikers
	MF	Grace Asantewaa	5 December 2000 (aged 19)	(Royal Spanish Football Federation) Logroño
	DF	Philicity Asuako	25 December 1999 (aged 20)	(Ghana Football Association) Police
	MF	Portia Boakye	17 April 1989 (aged 30)	(Swedish Football Association) Djurgården
	GK	Fafali Dumehasi	25 December 1993 (aged 26)	(Ghana Football Association) Police
	DF	Janet Egyir	7 May 1992 (aged 27)	(Ghana Football Association) Hasaacas
	DF	Linda Eshun	5 August 1992 (aged 27)	(Ghana Football Association) Hasaacas
	MF	Mary Essiful	22 June 1993 (aged 26)	(Ghana Football Association) Intellectuals
	FW	Priscilla Hagan	8 April 1996 (aged 23)	(Romanian Football Federation) Piroș Security
	MF	Faustina Kyeremeh		(Ghana Football Association) Immigration
	MF	Victoria Osei		(Ghana Football Association) Ampem Darkoa
	FW	Beatrice Sesu	27 November 1995 (aged 24)	(Ghana Football Association) Police
	MF	Sherifatu Sumaila	30 November 1996 (aged 23)	(Swedish Football Association) Mallbackens
	GK	Abigail Tawiah-Mensah		(Ghana Football Association) Halifax

=== Hong Kong ===
Coach: (Brazil) Ricardo

The squad was announced on 20 February 2020.

No.	Pos.	Player	Date of birth (age)	Club
	MF	Chan Chung Man Karri	(aged 15)	Unattached
	MF	Chan Wing Lam	(aged 16)	(Football Association of Hong Kong, China) Chelsea
	MF	Chan Wing Sze	11 September 1983 (aged 36)	(Football Association of Hong Kong, China) Shatin
	FW	Cheung Tsz Ching	(aged 18)	(Football Association of Hong Kong, China) Chelsea
	FW	Cheung Wai Ki	22 November 1990 (aged 29)	Unattached
	DF	Ho Wan Tung	29 May 1996 (aged 23)	(Football Association of Hong Kong, China) Kitchee
	DF	Hui Yee Sum	(aged 17)	(Football Association of Hong Kong, China) Citizen
	MF	Lam Yue Yan Natalie		Unattached
	FW	Sneha Limbu		(Football Association of Hong Kong, China) Citizen
	DF	Ma Chak Shun	2 March 1996 (aged 24)	Unattached
	GK	Ng Cheuk Wai	19 March 1997 (aged 22)	(Football Association of Hong Kong, China) Happy Valley
	GK	Ng Yuen Ki	20 December 1997 (aged 22)	(Football Association of Hong Kong, China) Chelsea
	DF	Sin Chung Yee	8 August 1992 (aged 27)	Unattached
	FW	So Hoi Lam	(aged 20)	Unattached
	FW	Tsang Lai Mae Halasan	(aged 18)	(Football Association of Hong Kong, China) Happy Valley
	DF	Tsang Pak Tung	(aged 16)	(Football Association of Hong Kong, China) Tai Po
	MF	Wai Yuen Ting	15 October 1992 (aged 27)	(Football Association of Hong Kong, China) Citizen
	DF	Wong Hei Tung	(aged 19)	(Football Association of Hong Kong, China) Chelsea
	DF	Wong So Han	26 November 1991 (aged 28)	(Football Association of Hong Kong, China) Happy Valley
	FW	Woo Lok Ki	(aged 21)	(Football Association of Hong Kong, China) Shatin
	DF	Wu Choi Yiu	(aged 15)	Unattached
	FW	Yuen Hoi Dik Heidi	22 August 1992 (aged 27)	Unattached

=== Hungary ===
Coach: Edina Markó

The squad was announced on 20 February 2020.

No.	Pos.	Player	Date of birth (age)	Club
	GK	Barbara Bíró	11 May 1995 (aged 24)	(Hungarian Football Federation) Viktória
	MF	Diána Csányi	20 March 1998 (aged 21)	(Hungarian Football Federation) MTK Hungária
	DF	Anna Csiki	14 November 1999 (aged 20)	(Hungarian Football Federation) Ferencváros
	MF	Edina Farádi-Szabó	22 June 1997 (aged 22)	(Hungarian Football Federation) MTK Hungária
	MF	Evelin Fenyvesi	7 November 1996 (aged 23)	(Hungarian Football Federation) Ferencváros
	DF	Boglárka Horti	1 July 1998 (aged 21)	(Hungarian Football Federation) Viktória
	MF	Petra Kocsán	4 June 1998 (aged 21)	(Hungarian Football Federation) Ferencváros
	DF	Laura Kovács	20 January 1989 (aged 31)	(Hungarian Football Federation) Győr
	MF	Zoé Magyarics	5 June 1998 (aged 21)	(Hungarian Football Federation) MTK Hungária
	DF	Evelin Mosdóczi	26 October 1994 (aged 25)	(Hungarian Football Federation) Ferencváros
	FW	Ágnes Nagy	27 July 1992 (aged 27)	(Hungarian Football Federation) MTK Hungária
	DF	Hanna Németh	17 September 1998 (aged 21)	(United States Soccer Federation) Indiana Hoosiers
	FW	Loretta Németh	9 December 1995 (aged 24)	(Hungarian Football Federation) MTK Hungária
	DF	Dóra Papp	5 January 1991 (aged 29)	(Hungarian Football Federation) MTK Hungária
	DF	Anita Pinczi	14 November 1993 (aged 26)	(Hungarian Football Federation) MTK Hungária
	MF	Sára Pusztai	16 November 2001 (aged 18)	(Hungarian Football Federation) Ferencváros
	MF	Zsófia Rácz	28 December 1988 (aged 31)	(Hungarian Football Federation) Viktória
	DF	Viktória Szabó	26 May 1997 (aged 22)	(Hungarian Football Federation) Ferencváros
	FW	Dóra Süle	20 September 1998 (aged 21)	(Hungarian Football Federation) Győr
	GK	Réka Szőcs	19 November 1989 (aged 30)	(Hungarian Football Federation) MTK Hungária
	DF	Lilla Turányi	20 December 1998 (aged 21)	(Hungarian Football Federation) MTK Hungária
	FW	Fanny Vágó	23 July 1991 (aged 28)	(Hungarian Football Federation) Ferencváros
	FW	Bernadett Zágor	31 January 1990 (aged 30)	(Austrian Football Association) SKN St. Pölten

=== BIIK Kazygurt ===
Coach: (Bulgaria) Kaloyan Petkov

=== Kenya ===
Coach: David Ouma

The squad was announced on 2 March 2020.

No.	Pos.	Player	Date of birth (age)	Club
	FW	Mwanalima Adam	4 September 1997 (aged 22)	(Football Kenya Federation) Thika Queens
	GK	Stella Ahono		(Football Kenya Federation) Zetech Sparks
	MF	Mercy Airo	20 October 1999 (aged 20)	(Football Kenya Federation) Kisumu All Starlets
	DF	Lucy Akoth	12 December 1999 (aged 20)	(Football Kenya Federation) Mathare United
	DF	Lydia Akoth	22 September 1994 (aged 25)	(Football Kenya Federation) Thika Queens
	MF	Sheril Angachi	1 January 2000 (aged 20)	(Football Kenya Federation) Gaspo Youth
	FW	Stella Anyango		(Football Kenya Federation) Nakuru AllStars
	FW	Purity Anyetu		(Football Kenya Federation) Zetech Sparks
	MF	Janet Bundi	15 December 1996 (aged 23)	(Football Kenya Federation) Eldoret Falcons
	MF	Silvia Makhungu		(Football Kenya Federation) Kariobangi North
	MF	Rachael Muema		(Football Kenya Federation) Thika Queens
	DF	Vivian Nasaka	19 December 1999 (aged 20)	(Football Kenya Federation) Vihiga Queens
	DF	Foscah Nashivanda	16 October 2000 (aged 19)	(Football Kenya Federation) Zetech Sparks
	MF	Jane Njeri		(Football Kenya Federation) Falling Waters
	GK	Monica Odato		(Football Kenya Federation) Wadadia
	GK	Judith Osimbo	8 August 1999 (aged 20)	(Football Kenya Federation) Gaspo Youth
	DF	Nelly Sawe		(Football Kenya Federation) Thika Queens
	MF	Jentrix Shikangwa	27 November 2001 (aged 18)	(Football Kenya Federation) Wiyeta
	DF	Dorcas Shikobe (captain)	4 April 1989 (aged 30)	(Football Kenya Federation) Oserian
	FW	Dorcas Shiveka		(Football Kenya Federation) Eldoret Falcons
	FW	Topister Situma		(Football Kenya Federation) Vihiga Queens

=== Northern Ireland U-19 ===
Coach: Alfie Wylie

The squad was announced on 1 March 2020.

No.	Pos.	Player	Date of birth (age)	Club
	FW	Joely Andrews	30 April 2002 (aged 17)	(Irish Football Association) Glentoran
	FW	Kerry Beattie	27 September 2002 (aged 17)	(Irish Football Association) Glentoran
	DF	Kirsty Cameron	6 June 2002 (aged 17)	(Irish Football Association) Crusaders Strikers
	DF	Beth Chalmers	25 July 2002 (aged 17)	(Irish Football Association) Crusaders Strikers
	MF	Caitlin Chapman		(The Football Association) Stoke City
	DF	Sasha Clare	19 December 2002 (aged 17)	(Irish Football Association) Crusaders Strikers
	GK	Maddie Clifford-Harvey	8 May 2002 (aged 17)	(Irish Football Association) Crusaders Strikers
	DF	Shona Davis	12 July 2003 (aged 16)	(Irish Football Association) Cliftonville
	DF	Naomi Donnan	29 January 2001 (aged 19)	(Irish Football Association) Linfield
	MF	Mia Fitzsimmons	13 December 2002 (aged 17)	(Irish Football Association) Linfield
	FW	Faith Johnston	31 March 2002 (aged 17)	(Irish Football Association) Crusaders Strikers
	MF	Sophie Megaw	5 August 2002 (aged 17)	(Irish Football Association) Lisburn Rangers
	FW	Cora Morgan	21 June 2003 (aged 16)	(Irish Football Association) Linfield
	DF	Fionnuala Morgan	24 August 2003 (aged 16)	(Irish Football Association) Cliftonville
	MF	Grainne O'Casey	25 January 2003 (aged 17)	(United States Soccer Federation) FC Dallas
	MF	Holly Otter		(Irish Football Association) Crusaders Strikers
	DF	Aimee-Lee Peachey	6 July 2002 (aged 17)	(Irish Football Association) Glentoran
	GK	Lauren Perry	5 April 2001 (aged 18)	(The Football Association) Blackburn Rovers
	MF	Jessica Rea	19 September 2002 (aged 17)	(Irish Football Association) Crusaders Strikers
	MF	Beth Smyth	12 November 2001 (aged 18)	(The Football Association) Manchester City

=== Romania ===
Coach: Mirel Albon

The squad was announced on 26 February 2020. Andreea Părăluță was injured during training before the second match and withdrew from the squad, being replaced by Mirela Ganea.

No.	Pos.	Player	Date of birth (age)	Club
1	GK	Andreea Părăluță	27 November 1994 (aged 25)	(Royal Spanish Football Federation) Levante
1	GK	Mirela Ganea	14 January 1986 (aged 34)	(Romanian Football Federation) U Olimpia Cluj
2	DF	Cristina Codrescu	31 October 1993 (aged 26)	(Romanian Football Federation) Fortuna Becicherecu Mic
3	MF	Alexandra Kuhnle		(United States Soccer Federation) William & Mary Tribe
4	MF	Ioana Bortan	23 January 1989 (aged 31)	(Romanian Football Federation) U Olimpia Cluj
5	DF	Teodora Meluță	3 August 1999 (aged 20)	(Romanian Football Federation) U Olimpia Cluj
6	DF	Maria Ficzay	8 November 1991 (aged 28)	(Romanian Football Federation) U Olimpia Cluj
7	FW	Andreea Laiu	15 March 1986 (aged 33)	(Israel Football Association) Maccabi Holon
8	MF	Ștefania Vătafu	12 July 1993 (aged 26)	(Royal Belgian Football Association) Anderlecht
9	FW	Laura Rus	1 October 1987 (aged 32)	(Royal Belgian Football Association) Anderlecht
10	MF	Andreea Voicu	16 January 1996 (aged 24)	(Romanian Football Federation) U Olimpia Cluj
11	FW	Florentina Olar	6 August 1985 (aged 34)	(Danish Football Association) Nordsjælland
12	GK	Sara Câmpean	16 July 2003 (aged 16)	(Romanian Football Federation) U Olimpia Cluj
13	DF	Erika Gered	28 April 1999 (aged 20)	(Romanian Football Federation) Vasas
14	MF	Andrea Herczeg (captain)	13 September 1994 (aged 25)	(Hungarian Football Federation) Szent Mihály
15	DF	Diana Grecu	8 April 1999 (aged 20)	(Romanian Football Federation) Heniu Prundu Bârgăului
16	FW	Denisa Predoi	28 August 1999 (aged 20)	(Romanian Football Federation) Independența Baia Mare
17	DF	Claudia Bistrian	31 August 1996 (aged 23)	(Romanian Football Federation) Fortuna Becicherecu Mic
18	MF	Alexandra Hornea	13 June 1996 (aged 23)	(Romanian Football Federation) Heniu Prundu Bârgăului
19	MF	Mihaela Ciolacu	12 August 1998 (aged 21)	(Romanian Football Federation) U Olimpia Cluj
20	MF	Szidónia Papp		(Hungarian Football Federation) Szent Mihály
21	FW	Oana Negrea	28 September 2000 (aged 19)	(The Football Association) University of London
22	DF	Maria Stamate	2 June 1999 (aged 20)	(Romanian Football Federation) Universitatea Galați

=== Venezuela ===
Coach: (Italy) Pamela Conti

The squad was announced on 17 February 2020. Venezuela later withdrew from the competition before its beginning and was replaced by Belarus and BIIK Kazygurt.

No.	Pos.	Player	Date of birth (age)	Club
	FW	Oriana Altuve	3 October 1992 (aged 27)	(Royal Spanish Football Federation) Rayo Vallecano
	MF	Yusmery Ascanio	20 December 1990 (aged 29)	(Football Federation of Chile) Colo-Colo
	MF	Maikerlin Astudillo	10 May 1992 (aged 27)	(Royal Spanish Football Federation) CFF Cáceres
	DF	Petra Cabrera	19 May 1990 (aged 29)	(Brazilian Football Confederation) 3B da Amazônia
	GK	Nayluisa Cáceres	18 November 1999 (aged 20)	(Royal Spanish Football Federation) UDG Tenerife
	FW	Deyna Castellanos	18 April 1999 (aged 20)	(Royal Spanish Football Federation) Atlético Madrid
	GK	Lisbeth Castro	28 April 1988 (aged 31)	Unattached
	DF	Neily Carrasquel	26 July 1997 (aged 22)	(Venezuelan Football Federation) Atlético Venezuela
	FW	Gabriela García	2 April 1997 (aged 22)	(Royal Spanish Football Federation) Deportivo La Coruña
	DF	Yenifer Giménez	3 May 1996 (aged 23)	(French Football Federation) Thonon Évian
	MF	Nairelis Gutiérrez	2 July 1995 (aged 24)	Unattached
	DF	Tahicelis Marcano	12 April 1997 (aged 22)	Unattached
	DF	Oriana Martínez	2 December 1989 (aged 30)	(Royal Spanish Football Federation) CFF Joventud Almassora
	MF	Kika Moreno	25 January 1997 (aged 23)	(Royal Spanish Football Federation) Deportivo La Coruña
	DF	Claudia Rodríguez	2 May 1995 (aged 24)	(Royal Spanish Football Federation) Lorca Deportiva
	MF	Daniuska Rodríguez	4 January 1999 (aged 21)	(Portuguese Football Federation) Braga
	DF	María Eugenia Rodríguez	26 November 1994 (aged 25)	Unattached
	MF	Michelle Romero	12 June 1997 (aged 22)	(Royal Spanish Football Federation) Deportivo La Coruña
	MF	Natasha Rosas	21 August 1993 (aged 26)	(Brazilian Football Confederation) 3B da Amazônia
	MF	Karla Torres	4 June 1992 (aged 27)	(Portuguese Football Federation) Paio Pires
	GK	Yessica Velásquez	28 July 1989 (aged 30)	(Brazilian Football Confederation) 3B da Amazônia
	MF	Marialba Zambrano	17 June 1995 (aged 24)	Unattached

== Player representation ==
The information represents only the eight national teams taking part in the competition.

=== By club ===
Clubs with 4 or more players represented are listed.

Players	Club
9	(Belarus) Minsk, (Chile) Santiago Morning, (Hungary) MTK Hungária
7	(Belarus) Isloch-RGUOR, (Hungary) Ferencváros, (Northern Ireland) Crusaders Strikers, (Romania) U Olimpia Cluj
4	(Hong Kong) Chelsea, (Kenya) Thika Queens

=== By club nationality ===
Players	Clubs
23	Hungary
21	Kenya
20	Belarus
16	Northern Ireland
15	Romania
14	Chile, Hong Kong
12	Ghana
9	Spain
4	England
3	United States
2	Belgium, Sweden
1	Austria, China, Denmark, Estonia, France, Israel, Lithuania

=== By club federation ===
Players	Federation
97	UEFA
33	CAF
15	AFC
14	CONMEBOL
3	CONCACAF

=== By representatives of domestic league ===
National squad	Players
Hungary	21
Kenya	21
Belarus	20
Northern Ireland	16
Chile	14
Hong Kong	14
Romania	14
Ghana	12
