= Yazmin =

Yazmin or Yazmín is a given name, and may refer to the following people:

- Yazmin Aziz (born 2001), singer-songwriter
- Yazmín Colón de Cortizo, first lady of Panama (2019–)
- Yazmín Copete (1964–), Mexican politician
- Yazmin Jauregui (1999–), Mexican mixed martial artist
- Yazmín Torrealba (1992–) Chilean footballer
