= Sára Pusztai =

Hungarian footballer (born 2001)

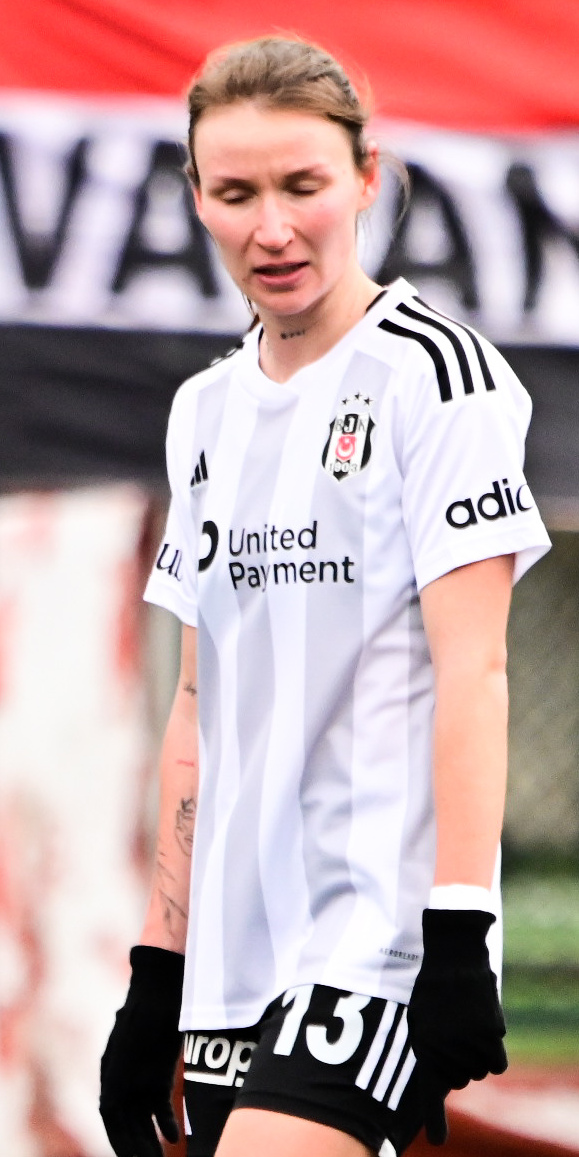
- Pusztai with Beşiktaş in 2024

Personal information
- Date of birth: 16 November 2001 (age 24)
- Place of birth: Debrecen, Hungary
- Height: 1.64 m (5 ft 5 in)
- Position: Midfielder

Team information
- Current team: RB Leipzig
- Number: 18

Youth career
- 2010–2012: Püspökladányi LE
- 2012–2014: Loki Focisuli Debrecen KSE
- 2014–2016: Ferencváros

Senior career*
Years	Team	Apps	(Gls)
2016–2023	Ferencváros	65	(16)
2017	→ Kóka FNLA (loan)	11	(1)
2024	Beşiktaş	11	(4)
2024–2026	OH Leuven	49	(5)
2026–	RB Leipzig	5	(1)

International career^{‡}
2016–2018	Hungary U17	9	(7)
2018–2019	Hungary U19	12	(3)
2019–	Hungary	34	(8)
- * Club domestic league appearances and goals as of 21:59, 7 October 2026 (UTC) ‡ National team caps and goals as of 21:59, 7 October 2026 (UTC)

Sára Pusztai (born 16 November 2001) is a Hungarian professional footballer who plays as a midfielder for Frauen-Bundesliga club RB Leipzig and the Hungary national team.

== Club career ==
=== Hungary ===
Pusztai started her career at Loki Focisuli in Debrecen, and first participated in futsal competitions with boys and then with girls. She continued playing futsal with the Ferencváros, but she also focused on big-field football and validated her talent in age group championships. In the 2015-16 U17 championship, she scored 17 goals, and took a silver medal in 19 games. Thanks to her outstanding performance, she was able to continue training in the senior team the following season. At the age of 15 years and three days, she made her debut in the top flight on 19 November 19, 2016 against Újpest FC in the 2016–17 season.

She started her next season as a loan player at Kóka FNLA, where she also scored her first top-flight goal. After eleven games, her parent club called her back, and they expected her to be a regular player for the rest of the season. One year later, she played an important role in her team's championship title, and started as a starter in her club's 2019–20 UEFA Women's Champions League qualifying round matches against Slovan Bratislava from Slovakia, Anenii Noi from Moldova, and Spartak Subotica from Serbia. In the 2020–21 UEFA Women's Champions League qualifying rounds, she contributed two goals to a 6–1 success against Racing Union Luxembourg, however, the defeat against Pomurje from Slovenia marked the end of the qualifiers for Ferencváros. She appeared in the 2021–22 UEFA Women's Champions League qualifying rounds against Czarni Sosnowiec from Poland, and Vllaznia from Albania. At the 2023–24 UEFA Women's Champions League qualifying rounds, she played against Kiryat Gat from Israel, and Spartak Myjava from Slovakia, where she scored one goal.

=== Turkey ===
Mid January 2024, she moved to Turkey, and joined the Istanbul-based club Beşiktaş to play in the second half of the 2023-24 Super League season. On 20 February 2024, she suffered rupture of muscle bundles that caused her to stay away one month from the pitch. She scored four goals in eleven matches played. By August 2024, she left Turkey for Belgium.

=== Belgium ===
On 23 July 2024, Pusztai was announced at OH Leuven, signing a one-year contract to play in the 2024–25 Belgian Super League. On 18 February 2026, she scored the club's lone goal in a 7–1 aggregate loss against Arsenal in the playoff knockout round of the 2025–26 Champions League season.

== International career ==
=== Hungary U17 ===
Pusztai played in the national U17 team at the UEFA Women's Under-17 Championship qualification of 2017, scoring one goal each against Azerbaijan, and Serbia, as well as of 2018, scoring one goal against Bulgaria.

=== Hungary U19 ===
She was admitted to the national U19 team for the UEFA Women's Under-19 Championship matches. She played at the 2019 qualification, scoring one goal each against Moldova, North Macedonia, and Serbia. At the 2020 qualification, she scored two goals each against Turkey, and Kosovo.

=== Hungary ===
As a member of national team, Pusztai took part at the 2020 Turkish Women's Cup took part at the 2020 Turkish Women's Cup, where her team became the runner-up. She was part of the national team, which ranked fourth at the 2023 Cyprus Women's Cup.

Since 2019, she has appeared in the national team 21 times and scored 7 goals.

== Career statistics ==
=== International ===
As of match played 9 June 2026

Appearances and goals by national team and year
National team	Year	Apps	Goals
Hungary
Hungary	2019	2	1
Hungary	2026	4	2
Hungary	2021	2	0
Hungary	2022	6	4
Hungary	2023	5	0
Hungary	2024	4	0
Hungary	2025	5	1
Hungary	2026	6	1
Total		34	8

Scores and results list Hungary's goal tally first, score column indicates score after each Pusztai goal.

List of international goals scored by Sára Pusztai
No.	Date	Venue	Opponent	Score	Result	Competition
1	12 November 2019	Rohonci út, Szombathely, Hungary	Latvia	4–0	4–0	UEFA Women's Euro 2022 qualifying
2	22 September 2020	Daugava Stadium, Liepāja, Latvia	Latvia	3–0	5–0	UEFA Women's Euro 2022 qualifying
3	23 October 2020	Illovszky Rudolf Stadion, Budapest, Hungary	Slovakia	1–2	1–2	UEFA Women's Euro 2022 qualifying
4	5 September 2022	Victoria Stadium, Gibraltar	Gibraltar	9–0	12–0	Friendly
5	7 October 2022	Letná Stadion, Zlín, Czech Republic	Czech Republic	2–2	3–3	Friendly
6	7 October 2022	Letná Stadion, Zlín, Czech Republic	Czech Republic	3–2	3–3	Friendly
7	15 November 2022	Haladás Sportkomplexum, Szombathely, Hungary	Uzbekistan	3–0	5–0	Friendly
8	24 October 2025	Hidegkuti Nándor Stadion, Budapest, Hungary	Luxembourg	2–0	4–0	Friendly
9	9 June 2026	Illovszky Rudolf Stadion, Budapest, Hungary	Andorra	6–1	6–1	2027 FIFA Women's World Cup qualification

== Honours ==
Ferencváros

- Női NB I: 2018–19, 2020–21, 2021–22, 2022–23; runner-up: 2016–17, 2017–18
- Hungarian Women's Cup: 2016–17, 2017–18, 2018–19, 2020–21

Hungary

- Turkish Women's Cup: 2020
