= 2023 in New Zealand association football =

Football in New Zealand
- Season: 2023

Men's football
- National League: Wellington Olympic
- Northern League: Auckland City
- Central League: Wellington Olympic
- Southern League: Christchurch United
- Chatham Cup: Christchurch United

Women's football
- Women's National League: Auckland United
- NRFL Women's Premiership: Auckland United
- Kate Sheppard Cup: Western Springs

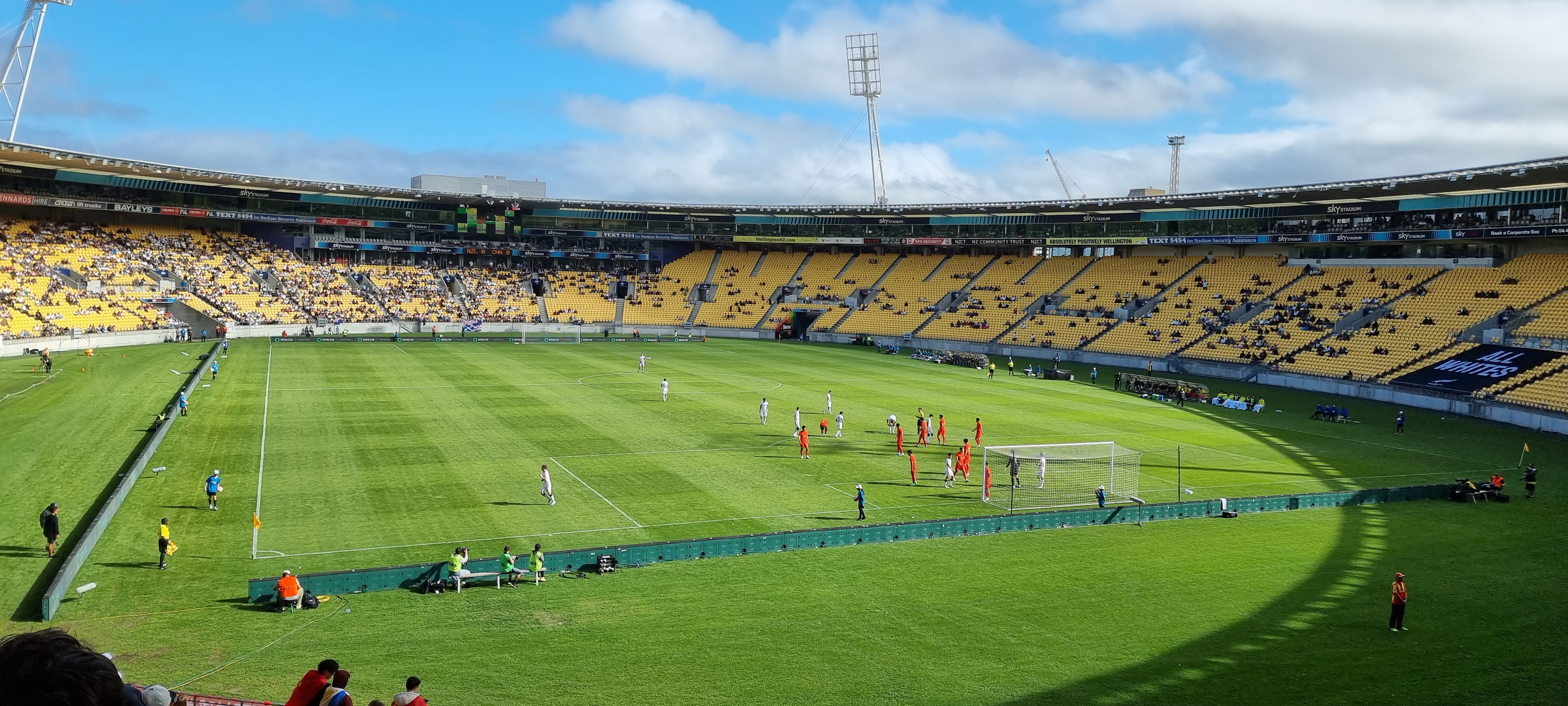
New Zealand playing against China at Sky Stadium, Wellington on 26 March 2023.

The 2023 season was the 133rd competitive association football season in New Zealand.

== National teams ==
=== New Zealand men's national football team ===
==== Results and fixtures ====
===== Friendlies =====
23 March 2023 Friendly	New Zealand	0–0	China	Auckland, New Zealand
19:00 UTC+13		Report		Stadium: Mt Smart Stadium; Attendance: 12,049; Referee: Sivakorn Pu-udom (Thailand)

26 March 2023 Friendly	New Zealand	2–1	China	Wellington, New Zealand
16:00 UTC+13	Zhu Chenjie 43' (o.g.); Garbett 81'	Report	Ba Dun 90+2'	Stadium: Sky Stadium; Attendance: 10,307; Referee: Kim Woo-sung (Korea Republic)

16 June Friendly	Sweden	4–1	New Zealand	Solna, Sweden
19:00 UTC+1	Karlsson 39', 45'; Quaison 44'; Elanga 90+2'	Report	McCowatt 7'	Stadium: Friends Arena; Attendance: 20,528; Referee: Craig Pawson (England)

19 June Friendly	Qatar	Abandoned	New Zealand	Ritzing, Austria
		Report	Stamenić 17'	Stadium: Sonnensee Stadium; Attendance: 150; Referee: Manuel Schüttengruber (Austria)
Note: Match was abandoned at halftime after Qatar winger, Yusuf Abdurisag, was alleged to have racially abused New Zealand centre-back, Michael Boxall.

13 October Friendly	New Zealand	1–1	DR Congo	Murcia, Spain
18:00 UTC+1	Wood 90+1' (pen.)	Report	Bakambu 46'	Stadium: Estadio Nueva Condomina; Referee: Jason Barcelo (Gibraltar)

17 October Soccer Ashes	Australia	2–0	New Zealand	London, England
19:45 UTC+1	Souttar 13'; Irvine 76'	Report		Stadium: Brentford Community Stadium; Attendance: 5,761; Referee: Stuart Attwell (England)

17 November Friendly	Greece	2–0	New Zealand	Athens, Greece
19:00 UTC+2	Konstantelias 10'; Giakoumakis 29'	Report		Stadium: Georgios Kamaras Stadium; Attendance: 0 (behind closed doors); Referee: Luca Cibelli (Switzerland)

21 November Friendly	Republic of Ireland	1–1	New Zealand	Dublin, Ireland
19:45 UTC+1	Idah 28'	Report	Garbett 59'	Stadium: Aviva Stadium; Attendance: 26,517; Referee: Urs Schnyder (Switzerland)

=== New Zealand women's national football team ===
==== Results and fixtures ====
===== Friendlies =====
18 January 2023 Friendly	New Zealand	0–4	United States	Wellington, New Zealand
		Report	Swanson 52', 63'; Morgan 60'; Williams 74'	Stadium: Sky Stadium; Attendance: 12,508; Referee: Kate Jacewicz (Australia)

21 January 2023 Friendly	New Zealand	0–5	United States	Auckland, New Zealand
		Report	Hatch 22'; Lavelle 39', 74'; Swanson 53'; Kornieck 80'	Stadium: Eden Park; Attendance: 12,721; Referee: Lara Lee (Australia)

17 February 2023 Friendly	New Zealand	0–5	Portugal	Hamilton, New Zealand
19:00 NZT		Report	J.Silva 17'; D.Silva 42'; Capeta 63', 69'; Pinto 79'	Stadium: Waikato Stadium; Attendance: 3,788; Referee: Emikar Calderas (Venezuela)

20 February 2023 Friendly	New Zealand	0–2	Argentina	Hamilton, New Zealand
19:00 NZT		Report	Larroquette 17'; Cometti 90'	Stadium: Waikato Stadium; Attendance: 3,622; Referee: Lara Lee (Australia)

23 February 2023 Friendly	New Zealand	0–1	Argentina	Auckland, New Zealand
19:00 NZT		Report	Larroquette 77'	Stadium: North Harbour Stadium; Attendance: 3,914; Referee: Tatiana Guzmán (Nicaragua)

7 April 2023 Friendly	New Zealand	1–1	Iceland	Antalya, Turkey
16:00 UTC+3	Wilkinson 34'	Report	Brynjarsdóttir 27'	Stadium: Mardan Sports Complex; Referee: Melis Özçiğdem (Turkey)

11 April 2023 Friendly	New Zealand	0–3	Nigeria	Antalya, Turkey
16:00 UTC+3		Report	Ebi 34'; Echegini 49'; Oparanozie 90+5'	Stadium: Mardan Sports Complex; Referee: Arda Kardeşler (Turkey)

10 July 2023 Friendly	New Zealand	2–0	Vietnam	Napier, New Zealand
17:30 NZT	Bott 17'; Hand 44'	Report		Stadium: McLean Park; Attendance: 6,215; Referee: Rebecca Durcau (Australia)

14 July 2023 Friendly	New Zealand	0–1	Italy	Auckland, New Zealand
19:00		Report	Giacinti 23'	Stadium: Keith Hay Park; Attendance: 0 (behind closed doors)

23 September Friendly	Chile	3–0	New Zealand	Santiago, Chile
19:00 UTC−3	Zamora 27'; Acuña 31'; López 47'	Report		Stadium: Estadio Bicentenario de La Florida; Attendance: 5,341; Referee: Nadia Fuques (Uruguay)

26 September Friendly	Chile	2–1	New Zealand	Santiago, Chile
11:00 UTC−3	Aedo 56'; Araya 90+4'	Report	Hassett 81'	Stadium: Quilín Complex; Attendance: 0 (Behind closed doors)

2 December Friendly	Colombia	0–0	New Zealand	Bogotá, Colombia
16:00 UTC−5		Report		Stadium: Estadio El Campin

5 December Friendly	Colombia	1–0	New Zealand	Bogotá, Colombia
15:00 UTC−5	Montoya 71'	Report		Stadium: Estadio Metropolitano de Techo; Attendance: 0 (Behind closed doors); Referee: Zulma Quiñónez (Paraguay)

===== 2023 FIFA Women's World Cup =====
====== Group A ======
Pos	Team	Pld	W	D	L	GF	GA	GD	Pts	Qualification
1	Switzerland	3	1	2	0	2	0	+2	5	Advance to knockout stage
2	Norway	3	1	1	1	6	1	+5	4	Advance to knockout stage
3	New Zealand (H)	3	1	1	1	1	1	0	4	
4	Philippines	3	1	0	2	1	8	−7	3	

Source: FIFA
Rules for classification: Group stage tiebreakers
(H) Hosts

20 July FIFA WC Group	New Zealand	1–0	Norway	Auckland, New Zealand
19:00 NZT	Wilkinson 48'	Report		Stadium: Eden Park; Attendance: 42,137; Referee: Yoshimi Yamashita (Japan)

25 July FIFA WC Group	New Zealand	0–1	Philippines	Wellington, New Zealand
17:30 NZT		Report	Sarina Bolden 24'	Stadium: Wellington Regional Stadium; Attendance: 32,357; Referee: Katia García (Mexico)

30 July FIFA WC Group	Switzerland	0–0	New Zealand	Dunedin, New Zealand
19:00 NZT		Report		Stadium: Forsyth Barr Stadium; Attendance: 25,947; Referee: Tori Penso (United States)

=== New Zealand men's national under-23 football team ===
==== Results and fixtures ====
===== Friendlies =====
23 March 2023 Friendly	New Zealand	2–0	China	Auckland, New Zealand
15:30 UTC+13	Sutton 45' (pen.); Bidois 69'	Report		Stadium: Mt Smart Stadium; Referee: Anna-Marie Keighley (New Zealand)

26 March 2023 Friendly	New Zealand	2–1	China	Wellington, New Zealand
12:30 UTC+13	Old 10'; Herdman 86'	Report	Wen 26'	Stadium: Sky Stadium; Referee: Campbell-Kirk Kawana-Waugh (New Zealand)

===== 2023 OFC Men's Olympic Qualifying Tournament =====
====== Group A ======
Pos	Team	Pld	W	D	L	GF	GA	GD	Pts	Qualification
1	New Zealand (H)	2	2	0	0	6	1	+5	6	Advance to knockout stage
2	Fiji	2	1	0	1	3	3	0	3	Advance to knockout stage
3	Papua New Guinea (Note: Papua New Guinea were unable to travel to New Zealand prior to their scheduled match on 27 August. The matter was resolved by awarding New Zealand with a 3–0 win.)	2	0	0	2	0	5	−5	0	
4	American Samoa (Note: American Samoa withdrew from the tournament on 1 August 2023.)	0	0	0	0	0	0	0	0	Withdrew

Source: OFC
(H) Hosts
Notes:

27 August 2023	New Zealand	3–0; Awarded	Papua New Guinea	Auckland, New Zealand
15:00		Report		Stadium: Go Media Stadium; Referee: Norbert Hauata (Tahiti)

30 August 2023	New Zealand	3–1	Fiji	Auckland, New Zealand
15:00	Toomey 19'; Ott 21'; Randall 25'	Report	Yada 50'	Stadium: Go Media Stadium; Attendance: 531; Referee: Ben Aukwai (Solomon Islands)

====== Knockout stage ======
6 September 2023 Semi-final	New Zealand	8–0	Vanuatu	Auckland, New Zealand
15:00	Randall 3', 12'; van Hattum 10', 39'; Ott 17' (pen.); Verney 43'; Raj 55', 72'	Report		Stadium: Go Media Stadium; Attendance: 188; Referee: Mederic Lacour (New Caledonia)

9 September 2023 Final	New Zealand	9–0	Fiji	Auckland, New Zealand
19:00	Bidois 3' (pen.), 6', 19', 45+1', 66'; Randall 34' (pen.); Gillion 57'; Turagalailai 78' (o.g.); Kelly 82'	Report		Stadium: North Harbour Stadium; Attendance: 1,284; Referee: Norbert Hauata (Tahiti)

=== New Zealand national under-20 football team ===
==== Results and fixtures ====
===== Friendlies =====
15 May 2023 Friendly	Ecuador	0–1	New Zealand	Argentina
		Report	Wallace 71'

===== 2023 PSSI U-20 Mini Tournament =====
Pos	Team	Pld	W	D	L	GF	GA	GD	Pts
1	Guatemala	3	3	0	0	7	2	+5	9
2	New Zealand	3	2	0	1	6	4	+2	6
3	Indonesia (H)	3	1	0	2	5	3	+2	3
4	Fiji	3	0	0	3	1	10	−9	0

Source: Report
(H) Hosts

17 February 2023 2023 PSSI U-20 Mini Tournament	New Zealand	1–3	Guatemala	Jakarta, Indonesia
16:30 UTC+7	Colloty 7'	Report	Cordozza 54'; Bantes 60'; Avendaño 80'	Stadium: Gelora Bung Karno Stadium; Attendance: 0 Referee: Fariq Hitaba (Indonesia)

19 February 2023 2023 PSSI U-20 Mini Tournament	Indonesia	1–2	New Zealand	Jakarta, Indonesia
19:30 UTC+7	Ferarri 90+5'		Colloty 58'; Herdman 70'	Stadium: Gelora Bung Karno Stadium; Attendance: 0 Referee: Fariq Hitaba (Indonesia)

21 February 2023 2023 PSSI U-20 Mini Tournament	Fiji	0–3	New Zealand	Jakarta, Indonesia
16:30		Report	Beale 4'; Obel Hall 7'; Herdman 51'	Stadium: Gelora Bung Karno Stadium; Attendance: 0

===== 2023 FIFA U-20 World Cup =====
====== Group A ======
Pos	Team	Pld	W	D	L	GF	GA	GD	Pts	Qualification
1	Argentina (H)	3	3	0	0	10	1	+9	9	Knockout stage
2	Uzbekistan	3	1	1	1	5	4	+1	4	Knockout stage
3	New Zealand	3	1	1	1	3	7	−4	4	Knockout stage
4	Guatemala	3	0	0	3	0	6	−6	0	

Source: FIFA
Rules for classification: Group stage tiebreakers
(H) Hosts

20 May 2023 2023 FIFA U20 WC GS	Guatemala	0–1	New Zealand	Estadio Único Madre de Ciudades, Santiago del Estero
15:00		Report	Garbett 80'	Attendance: 15,100; Referee: Abongile Tom (South Africa)

23 May 2023 2023 FIFA U20 WC GS	Uzbekistan	2–2	New Zealand	Estadio Único Madre de Ciudades, Santiago del Estero
15:00	Fayzullaev 51'; Esanov 90+3'	Report	Wallace 23'; Herdman 41'	Attendance: 12,243; Referee: Oshane Nation (Jamaica)

26 May 2023 2023 FIFA U20 WC GS	New Zealand	0–5	Argentina	Estadio San Juan del Bicentenario, San Juan
18:00		Report	Maestro Puch 14'; Infantino 17'; Romero 35'; Aguirre 50' (pen.); Véliz 87'	Attendance: 27,836; Referee: Salman Falahi (Qatar)

====== Knockout stage ======
30 May 2023 Round of 16	United States	4–0	New Zealand	Estadio Malvinas Argentinas, Mendoza
14:30	Wolff 14'; Cowell 61'; Che 75'; Pukštas 82'	Report		Attendance: 7,848; Referee: Mohamed Marouf (Egypt)

=== New Zealand women's national under-20 football team ===
==== Results and fixtures ====
===== 2023 OFC U-19 Women's Championship =====
====== Group B ======
Pos	Team	Pld	W	D	L	GF	GA	GD	Pts	Qualification
1	New Zealand	2	2	0	0	14	0	+14	6	Knockout stage
2	Fiji (H)	2	1	0	1	2	3	−1	3	Knockout stage
3	Papua New Guinea	2	0	0	2	0	13	−13	0	

Source: OFC
(H) Hosts

22 June 2023	New Zealand	3–0	Fiji	Suva
16:00	Pijnenburg 15'; Trewhitt 65', 74'	Report		Stadium: HFC Bank Stadium; Attendance: 400; Referee: David Yareboinen (Papua New Guinea)

25 June 2023	New Zealand	11–0	Papua New Guinea	Suva
16:00	Elliott 3'; Cook 12', 20', 24', 54'; Errington 18', 71'; Benson 21', 37', 48', 56'	Report		Stadium: HFC Bank Stadium; Attendance: 150; Referee: Timothy Niu (Solomon Islands)

====== Knockout stage ======
2 July 2023 Quarter-final	New Zealand	19–0	Solomon Islands	Suva
15:00	McCann 9', 28', 34'; Nathan 13', 43', 51', 88', 90'; Benson 14', 55', 62'; Canham 16', 39'; Bercelli 19', 22', 36', 74'; Pijnenburg 45'; Colpi 68'	Report		Stadium: HFC Bank Stadium; Attendance: 100; Referee: Tellos Kaufusi (Tonga)

5 July 2023 Semi-final	New Zealand	5–0	Cook Islands	Suva
19:00	Rouru 22' (o.g.); Pijnenburg 26'; Colpi 45+2'; Nathan 70'; Bercelli 87'	Report		Stadium: HFC Bank Stadium; Attendance: 150; Referee: Tojika Delai (Fiji)

8 July 2023 Final	Fiji	0–7	New Zealand	Suva
19:00		Report	Elliott 13', 31'; McCann 40'; Nathan 52', 65'; Mortlock 74'; Pijnenburg 78' (pen.)	Stadium: HFC Bank Stadium; Attendance: 985; Referee: Shama Maemae (Solomon Islands)

=== New Zealand national under-17 football team ===
==== Results and fixtures ====
===== Friendlies =====
8 August 2023	New Zealand	1–1	New Caledonia	Auckland, New Zealand
15:00	Brown 45'	Report	Diko 24'	Stadium: Fred Taylor Park

10 August 2023	New Zealand	3–0	New Caledonia	Auckland, New Zealand
15:00		Report		Stadium: Fred Taylor Park

===== 2023 OFC U-17 Championship =====
====== Group B ======
Pos	Team	Pld	W	D	L	GF	GA	GD	Pts	Qualification
1	New Zealand	2	2	0	0	14	2	+12	6	Knockout stage
2	New Caledonia	2	1	0	1	9	3	+6	3	Knockout stage
3	American Samoa	2	0	0	2	0	18	−18	0	

Source: OFC

11 January 2023	New Zealand	3–2	New Caledonia	Fiji FA Academy, Ba
15:00	Supyk 9', 72' (pen.), 75'	Report	Nganyane 16'; Hnaissilin 69' (pen.)	Attendance: 80; Referee: Kavitesh Behari (Fiji)

14 January 2023	American Samoa	0–11	New Zealand	Fiji FA Academy, Ba
15:00		Report	Edwards 4'; Sloane-Rodrigues 11', 68'; Flowerdew 38', 45+2', 70', 88'; D'Hotman de Villiers 42', 76', 90+1'; Supyk 87' (pen.)	Attendance: 50; Referee: David Yareboinen (Papua New Guinea)

====== Knockout stage ======
22 January 2023 Quarter-final	New Zealand	1–0	Vanuatu	HFC Bank Stadium, Suva
19:00	Supyk 90+1' (pen.)	Report		Attendance: 400; Referee: Veer Singh (Fiji)

25 January 2023 Semi-final	Fiji	1–4	New Zealand	HFC Bank Stadium, Suva
19:00	Ravonokula 14'	Report	Watson 7', 50', 80'; Supyk 72'	Attendance: 1,000; Referee: Ben Aukwai (Solomon Islands)

28 January 2023 Final	New Caledonia	0–1	New Zealand	HFC Bank Stadium, Suva
19:00		Report	Bruce 24'	Attendance: 200; Referee: Veer Singh (Fiji)

===== 25th International Youth Soccer in Niigata =====
Pos	Team	Pld	W	D	L	GF	GA	GD	Pts
1	Venezuela	3	3	0	0	6	2	+4	9
2	Japan	3	2	0	1	9	4	+5	6
3	(Niigata Prefecture) Niigata Regional Team (H)	3	1	0	2	3	7	−4	3
4	New Zealand	3	0	0	3	1	6	−5	0

Source: JFA
(H) Hosts

14 September 2023	New Zealand	1–2	(Niigata Prefecture) Niigata Regional Team	Niigata, Japan
18:15	Watson 58'	Report	? 23'; ? 28'	Stadium: Niigata Athletic Stadium

16 September 2023	Japan	2–0	New Zealand	Niigata, Japan
15:30	Maeda 26'; Kajisa 43'	Report		Stadium: Niigata Athletic Stadium

18 September 2023	Venezuela	2–0	New Zealand	Niigata, Japan
18:15		Report		Stadium: Denka Big Swan Stadium

===== 2023 FIFA U-17 World Cup =====
====== Group F ======
Pos	Team	Pld	W	D	L	GF	GA	GD	Pts	Qualification
1	Germany	3	3	0	0	9	2	+7	9	Knockout stage
2	Mexico	3	1	1	1	7	5	+2	4	Knockout stage
3	Venezuela	3	1	1	1	5	5	0	4	Knockout stage
4	New Zealand	3	0	0	3	1	10	−9	0	

Source: FIFA

12 November 2023 2023 FIFA U17 WC GS	Venezuela	3–0	New Zealand	Jalak Harupat Stadium, Bandung
16:00	Martínez 29'; Romero 87', 90+7'	Report		Attendance: 2,932; Referee: Ibrahim Mutaz (Libya)

15 November 2023 2023 FIFA U17 WC GS	New Zealand	1–3	Germany	Jalak Harupat Stadium, Bandung
19:00	Watson 90+1' (pen.)	Report	Brunner 45+7'; Moerstedt 60'; Yalçınkaya 81'	Attendance: 5,353; Referee: Dahane Beida (Mauritania)

18 November 2023 2023 FIFA U17 WC GS	New Zealand	0–4	Mexico	Jalak Harupat Stadium, Bandung
16:00		Report	Barajas 42'; Fernandez 47'; Carrillo 54', 67' (pen.)	Attendance: 6,136; Referee: Omar Al Ali (United Arab Emirates)

=== New Zealand women's national under-17 football team ===
==== Results and fixtures ====
===== 2023 OFC U-16 Women's Championship =====
====== Group B ======
Pos	Team	Pld	W	D	L	GF	GA	GD	Pts	Qualification
1	New Zealand	3	3	0	0	43	1	+42	9	Knockout stage
2	Fiji	3	2	0	1	16	7	+9	6	Knockout stage
3	Cook Islands	3	1	0	2	2	17	−15	3	5th place match
4	Vanuatu	3	0	0	3	4	40	−36	0	7th place match

Source: OFC

14 September 2023	New Zealand	12–0	Cook Islands	Pirae, Tahiti
16:00	Teariki 6' (o.g.); Ardana 26'; Pivac 33'; De Wit 34'; Bennett 39', 45', 68', 79', 86'; Jerez 73'; Pugh 76'; Vlok 84'	Report		Stadium: Stade Pater Te Hono Nui; Attendance: 175; Referee: Tellos Kaufusi (Tonga)

17 September 2023	New Zealand	4–1	Fiji	Pirae, Tahiti
16:00	Bennett 27'; Jerez 40'; Young 50'; Vlok 52' (pen.)	Report	Qalivere 74'	Stadium: Stade Pater Te Hono Nui; Attendance: 179; Referee: Pari Oito (Tahiti)

20 September 2023	Vanuatu	0–27	New Zealand	Pirae, Tahiti
16:00		Report	Pivac 3', 8', 22', 33', 45', 69'; De Wit 6'; Ardana 14'; Young 19'; Jerez 20', 38', 58'; McGillivray 29'; Wanemut 45+3' (o.g.); Saxon 49'; Cleall-Harding 55', 66', 68', 76'; Bryant 60', 78'; Vlok 72', 81', 84', 90+5'; Bennett 83', 90+2'	Stadium: Stade Pater Te Hono Nui; Attendance: 170; Referee: Shama Maemae (Solomon Islands)

====== Knockout stage ======
23 September 2023 Semi-final	New Zealand	7–0	Tonga	Pirae, Tahiti
19:00	Pivac 8'; Pugh 35'; Vlok 49' (pen.); Jerez 53'; Bennett 54', 59'; de Wit 71'	Report		Stadium: Stade Pater Te Hono Nui; Attendance: 265; Referee: Shama Maemae (Solomon Islands)

26 September 2023 Final	Fiji	0–1	New Zealand	Pirae, Tahiti
19:00		Report	Pugh 90+4'	Stadium: Stade Pater Te Hono Nui; Attendance: 711; Referee: Shama Maemae (Solomon Islands)

== FIFA competitions ==
=== 2022 FIFA Club World Cup ===
1 February 2023 First round	Al Ahly (Egypt)	3–0	(New Zealand) Auckland City	Tangier, Egypt
20:00	El Shahat 45+2'; Sherif 56'; Tau 86'	Report		Stadium: Ibn Batouta Stadium; Attendance: 47,137; Referee: Ma Ning (China)

=== 2023 FIFA Club World Cup ===
12 December 2023 First round	Al-Ittihad (Saudi Arabia)	3–0	(New Zealand) Auckland City	King Abdullah Sports City, Jeddah
21:00	Romarinho 29'; Kanté 34'; Benzema 40'	Report		Attendance: 50,248; Referee: Tori Penso (United States)

== OFC Competitions ==
=== OFC Champions League ===
==== National play-offs ====
11 March 2023	Wellington Olympic (New Zealand)	1–1	(New Zealand) Auckland City	Martin Luckie Park, Wellington
14:00 (UTC+13:00)	Stevens 37'	Report	Gray 79'	Attendance: 520; Referee: Nick Waldron (New Zealand)

18 March 2023	Auckland City (New Zealand)	5–3 (6–4 agg.)	(New Zealand) Wellington Olympic	Kiwitea Street, Auckland
16:00 (UTC+13:00)	Gillion 23'; Tade 74', 77' (pen.), 87' (pen.); Kilkolly 85'	Report	Mata 15'; Watson 28', 62'	Referee: Campbell-Kirk Kawana-Waugh (New Zealand)

==== Group A ====
Pos	Team	Pld	W	D	L	GF	GA	GD	Pts	Qualification
1	(New Zealand) Auckland City	3	3	0	0	9	2	+7	9	Knockout stage
2	(Fiji) Suva	3	2	0	1	6	3	+3	6	Knockout stage
3	(Solomon Islands) Solomon Warriors	3	1	0	2	4	5	−1	3	
4	(Samoa) Lupe ole Soaga	3	0	0	3	0	9	−9	0	

Source: OFC

14 May 2023	Auckland City (New Zealand)	3–1	(Solomon Islands) Solomon Warriors	Luganville Soccer City Stadium, Luganville
12:00	Kilkolly 55' (pen.); Garriga 77'; de Vries 81'	Report	Tigi 9'	Attendance: 5,000; Referee: Norbert Hauata (Tahiti)

17 May 2023	Suva (Fiji)	1–3	(New Zealand) Auckland City	Luganville Soccer City Stadium, Luganville
15:00	Saniel 71'	Report	Gillion 14', 55'; Garriga 34'	Attendance: 5,500; Referee: David Yareboinen (Papua New Guinea)

20 May 2023	Lupe ole Soaga (Samoa)	Cancelled (Note: The Lupe ole Soaga v Auckland City match was cancelled due to injuries in the Lupe ole Soaga squad.)	(New Zealand) Auckland City	Luganville Soccer City Stadium, Luganville
12:00		Report		Referee: Arnold Tari (Vanuatu)

==== Knockout stage ====
24 May 2023	Auckland City (New Zealand)	2–2 (a.e.t.) (5–4 p)	(Vanuatu) Ifira Black Bird	VFF Freshwater Stadium, Port Vila
11:30	De Vries 68', 90+5'	Report	Iawak 39'; Tenene 60'	Attendance: 5,780; Referee: Ben Aukwai (Solomon Islands)
	Penalties
	den Heijer (penalty scored); Zhou (penalty scored); Kilkolly (penalty scored); Howieson (penalty scored); Vale (penalty scored)		Taiwia (penalty scored); Tenene (penalty scored); Welwel (penalty scored); Tasip (penalty scored); Napakaurana (penalty missed)

===== Final =====
27 May 2023	Auckland City (New Zealand)	4–2 (a.e.t.)	(Fiji) Suva	VFF Freshwater Stadium, Port Vila
14:00 UTC+11	Kilkolly 34' (pen.); De Vries 45+3', 120+4'; Howieson 109'	Report	Saniel 66'; Tahioa 83'	Attendance: 5,420; Referee: David Yareboinen (Papua New Guinea)

=== OFC Women's Champions League ===
Eastern Suburbs pulled out of the competition after the draw, citing concerns about costs, timing and security.

1 June 2023	Hekari United (Papua New Guinea)	Cancelled	(New Zealand) Eastern Suburbs	Sir Hubert Murray Stadium, Port Moresby
17:00

7 June 2023	Eastern Suburbs (New Zealand)	Cancelled	(Solomon Islands) Koloale	Sir Hubert Murray Stadium, Port Moresby
17:00

== Men's football ==
League	Promoted to league	Relegated from league	Removed	Joined
Northern League	Manurewa; West Coast Rangers	North Shore United; Waiheke United	None	None
Central League	Stop Out; Whanganui Athletic	Havelock North Wanderers	Wellington United	None
Southern League	FC Twenty 11	Mosgiel	None	None

=== National League ===
Pos	Team	Pld	W	D	L	GF	GA	GD	Pts	Qualification
1	Wellington Olympic (C)	9	7	2	0	34	15	+19	23	Qualification to Grand Final and Champions League National play-offs
2	Auckland City	9	7	0	2	19	12	+7	21	Qualification to Grand Final and Champions League National play-offs
3	Christchurch United	9	5	1	3	18	16	+2	16	
4	Eastern Suburbs	9	4	3	2	23	11	+12	15	
5	Cashmere Technical	9	4	1	4	24	24	0	13	
6	Manurewa	9	4	1	4	16	20	−4	13	
7	Auckland United	9	2	4	3	15	17	−2	10	
8	Wellington Phoenix Reserves (Note: Wellington Phoenix Reserves can not qualify for the Grand Final.)	9	3	0	6	19	24	−5	9	
9	Napier City Rovers	9	2	1	6	13	26	−13	7	
10	Petone	9	0	1	8	6	22	−16	1	

Source: New Zealand Football
Rules for classification: 1) Points; 2) Goal difference; 3) Goals for; 4) Goals against; 5) Head to head; 6) Disciplinary record
(C) Champions

==== Grand final ====
Sunday, 26 November 2023
13:00 NZDT

Wellington Olympic	2–0	Auckland City
Gould 58'; Sinclair 90+5'	Report

Mt Smart Stadium, Auckland
Referee: Nick Waldron

=== Northern League ===
Pos	Team	Pld	W	D	L	GF	GA	GD	Pts	Qualification
1	Auckland City (C)	22	19	3	0	64	9	+55	60	Winner of Northern League and qualification to National League Championship
2	Eastern Suburbs	22	17	5	0	51	17	+34	56	Qualification to National League Championship
3	Auckland United	22	13	4	5	50	24	+26	43	Qualification to National League Championship
4	Manurewa	22	11	3	8	46	37	+9	36	Qualification to National League Championship
5	Western Springs	22	10	3	9	39	35	+4	33	
6	Hamilton Wanderers	22	8	6	8	39	49	−10	30	
7	West Coast Rangers	22	8	2	12	33	49	−16	26	
8	Birkenhead United	22	7	4	11	46	44	+2	25	
9	Melville United	22	6	5	11	30	47	−17	23	
10	Bay Olympic	22	4	3	15	33	55	−22	15	
11	Takapuna (R)	22	4	3	15	23	50	−27	15	Relegation to NRFL Championship
12	Manukau United (R)	22	3	3	16	26	64	−38	12	Relegation to NRFL Championship

Rules for classification: 1) Points; 2) Goal difference; 3) Goals scored; 4) Goals against; 5) Head to head; 6) Disciplinary record; 7) Coin toss
(C) Champions; (R) Relegated

=== Central League ===
Pos	Team	Pld	W	D	L	GF	GA	GD	Pts	Qualification
1	Wellington Olympic (C)	18	14	3	1	71	28	+43	45	Winner of Central League and qualification to National League Championship
2	Wellington Phoenix Reserves (Note: Wellington Phoenix Reserves gain automatic entry into the National League Championship phase due to the A-League Men requirements.)	18	12	1	5	47	29	+18	37	Qualification to National League Championship
3	Napier City Rovers	18	10	3	5	50	32	+18	33	Qualification to National League Championship
4	Petone	18	10	2	6	45	33	+12	32	Qualification to National League Championship
5	Western Suburbs	18	9	4	5	39	26	+13	31	
6	Waterside Karori	18	7	3	8	44	40	+4	24	
7	Miramar Rangers	18	8	0	10	37	43	−6	24	
8	Stop Out	18	7	3	8	37	47	−10	24	
9	North Wellington	18	2	1	15	21	63	−42	7	
10	Whanganui Athletic (R)	18	1	2	15	19	69	−50	5	Relegation to Central Federation League

Source: Capital Football
Rules for classification: 1) Points; 2) Goal difference; 3) Goals scored; 4) Goals against; 5) Head to head; 6) Disciplinary record; 7) Coin toss
(C) Champions; (R) Relegated

=== Southern League ===
Pos	Team	Pld	W	D	L	GF	GA	GD	Pts	Qualification
1	Christchurch United (C)	18	16	1	1	72	12	+60	49	Winner of Southern League and qualification to National League Championship
2	Cashmere Technical	18	13	3	2	66	27	+39	42	Qualification to National League Championship
3	Coastal Spirit	18	10	1	7	30	36	−6	31	
4	Dunedin City Royals	18	8	5	5	44	29	+15	29	
5	Ferrymead Bays	18	9	2	7	35	36	−1	29	
6	Nelson Suburbs	18	7	4	7	48	46	+2	25	
7	Nomads United	18	7	2	9	32	35	−3	23	
8	Green Island (R)	18	5	1	12	33	58	−25	16	Relegated to the FootballSouth Premier League (Note: Green Island were relegated due to withdrawing from the 2024 Southern League.)
9	Selwyn United	18	3	1	14	21	53	−32	10	
10	FC Twenty 11	18	2	0	16	11	60	−49	6	

Source: Mainland Football
Rules for classification: 1) Points; 2) Goal difference; 3) Goals scored; 4) Goals against; 5) Head to head; 6) Disciplinary record; 7) Coin toss
(C) Champions; (R) Relegated

=== Cup Competitions ===
==== Chatham Cup ====
===== Final =====
10 September 2023
16:00

Melville United (2)	2–2 (a.e.t.)	Christchurch United (1)
Lim 72'; Tommy 90+8'	Report	Lim 11' (o.g.); Brown 36' (o.g.)
Penalties
McGovern (penalty missed); Hayes (penalty scored); McLeod (penalty scored); England (penalty missed)	2–4	(penalty scored) Stokes; (penalty scored) Lapslie; (penalty missed) Stearn; (penalty scored) Lindsay; (penalty scored) Tod-Smith

North Harbour Stadium, Auckland
Referee: Nick Waldron

== Women's football ==
=== National Women's League ===
Pos	Team	Pld	W	D	L	GF	GA	GD	Pts	Qualification
1	Auckland United (C)	9	7	1	1	25	9	+16	22	Qualification to Grand Final and Women's Champions League group stage
2	Southern United	9	7	1	1	22	6	+16	22	Qualification to Grand Final
3	Eastern Suburbs	9	7	0	2	22	12	+10	21	
4	Western Springs	9	6	1	2	28	11	+17	19	
5	CF Waterside Karori	9	4	1	4	18	16	+2	13 (Note: Tied on head to head. Disciplinary record: CF Waterside Karori 2, CF Wellington United 5)	
6	CF Wellington United	9	4	1	4	18	16	+2	13	
7	Canterbury United Pride	9	2	1	6	17	22	−5	7	
8	Wellington Phoenix Reserves (Note: Wellington Phoenix Reserves can not qualify for the Grand Final.)	9	2	1	6	12	26	−14	7	
9	Central Football	9	1	1	7	6	30	−24	4	
10	Ellerslie	9	1	0	8	3	23	−20	3	

Source: New Zealand Football
Rules for classification: 1) Points; 2) Goal difference; 3) Goals for; 4) Head to head; 5) Disciplinary record; 6) Coin toss
(C) Champions

==== Grand final ====
Sunday, 26 November 2023
16:00 NZDT

Auckland United	2–0	Southern United
Cook 24'; Dewell 57'	Report

Mt Smart Stadium, Auckland
Referee: Anna-Marie Keighley

=== NRFL Women's Premiership ===
Pos	Team	Pld	W	D	L	GF	GA	GD	Pts	Qualification
1	Auckland United (C)	14	11	1	2	42	13	+29	34	Winner of Northern League and qualification to National League Championship
2	Eastern Suburbs	14	10	1	3	52	18	+34	31	Qualification to National League Championship
3	Western Springs	14	7	3	4	42	22	+20	24	Qualification to National League Championship
4	Ellerslie	14	7	2	5	23	21	+2	23	Qualification to National League Championship
5	West Coast Rangers	14	7	1	6	28	15	+13	22	
6	Hamilton Wanderers	14	5	1	8	18	34	−16	16	
7	Hibiscus Coast	14	4	1	9	13	36	−23	13	
8	Northern Rovers (R)	14	0	0	14	3	62	−59	0	Relegation to NRFL Women's Championship

Source: Northern Region Football
Rules for classification: 1) Points; 2) Goal difference; 3) Goals scored; 4) Goals against; 5) Head to head; 6) Disciplinary record; 7) Coin toss
(C) Champions; (R) Relegated

=== Cup Competitions ===
==== Kate Sheppard Cup ====
===== Final =====
10 September 2023
13:00

Wellington United (2)	1–2	Western Springs (1)
Roberson 55'	Report	Tawharu 38'; Jerez 89'

North Harbour Stadium, Auckland
Referee: Anna-Marie Keighley

== Deaths ==
- 31 August 2023: Arthur Leong, 92, New Zealand and Technical Old Boys' defender.
- 13 December 2023: David Wallace, 83, New Zealand and Western Suburbs defender.

== Retirements ==
- 16 January 2023: Ángel Berlanga, 35, former Auckland City, and Central United defender.
- 26 May 2023: Anna Green, 32, former New Zealand, and Capital Football defender.

== New clubs ==
- FC Tauranga Moana (youth)
- Horowhenua Coastal
- Ngongotahā Lakes
- Ōtākaro (youth)
- Palmerston North United
