= Anastasiya Novikova =

Anastasiya Novikova may refer to:

- Anastasiya Novikova (journalist)
- Anastasiya Novikova (footballer)
