= Suya Haering =

New Zealand footballer (born 2005)

Personal information
- Full name: Suya Haering
- Date of birth: 3 July 2005 (age 21)
- Place of birth: Reston, Virginia, United States
- Height: 1.71 m (5 ft 7 in)
- Position: Defender

Team information
- Current team: Montpellier
- Number: 21

Youth career
- 2023–2024: Northern Rovers

Senior career*
Years	Team	Apps	(Gls)
2023–2024	Auckland United	1	(1)
2024–2025	FFC Turbine Potsdam	12	(0)
2025–2026	Carl Zeiss Jena	20	(0)
2026–	Montpellier	7	(0)

International career^{‡}
2022	New Zealand U17	3	(0)
2024	New Zealand U20	2	(0)
2026–	New Zealand	2	(0)
- * Club domestic league appearances and goals as of 21 November 2026 ‡ National team caps and goals as of 5 March 2026

Suya Haering (born 3 July 2005) is a New Zealand professional footballer who plays as a defender for Première Ligue club Montpellier and the New Zealand national team. She previously played for New Zealand Women's National League (NZWNL) club Auckland United and former Frauen-Bundesliga club 1. FFC Turbine Potsdam and Carl Zeiss Jena. Haering has additionally represented the New Zealand under-17 and under-20 national teams.

== Early life ==
Haering was born in 2005 and was educated at Rangitoto College in Auckland, New Zealand. Until January 2023, she played for Northern Rovers.

== Club career ==
=== Auckland United ===
In January 2023, Haering signed for Auckland United in New Zealand Women's National League. In November 2023, Auckland United won the 2023 Women's National League Grand Final and Premiership, with Haering starting in the final.

=== 1. FFC Turbine Potsdam ===
In January 2024, Haering signed for 1. FFC Turbine Potsdam, a German club then part of the Frauen-Bundesliga. Haering made 12 appearances. Turbine Potsdam would go on to be relegated at the end of the 2024–25 Frauen-Bundesliga season.

=== Carl Zeiss Jena ===
On 18 July 2025, Haering signed for Carl Zeiss Jena ahead of the 2025–26 Frauen-Bundesliga season. Haering made her debut on 8 September 2025, coming on in the 70th minute in a 4–1 home defeat against Hoffenheim.

=== Montpellier HSC ===
For the 2026/27 season, Haering is moving to the French Première Ligue club Montpellier.

== International career ==
=== New Zealand U17 ===
In September 2022, Haering was named as part of the 21-woman Young Football Ferns squad for the 2022 FIFA U-17 Women's World Cup in India. Haering played in all three of New Zealand's matches, with the team finishing last in Group B.

=== New Zealand U20 ===
In August 2024, Haering was named as part of the 21-woman Junior Football Ferns squad for the 2024 FIFA U-20 Women's World Cup in Colombia. She played in two of three of New Zealand's Group E matches — in a 7–0 defeat against Japan and in a 3–1 defeat against Austria. New Zealand exited the tournament at the group stage.

=== New Zealand ===
In February 2026, following an injury to Lara Wall, Football Ferns head coach Michael Mayne called up Haering for the first time to New Zealand's senior squad for 2027 FIFA Women's World Cup qualification matches. Haering made her senior international debut in an 8–0 win against the Solomon Islands on 2 March 2026. On 5 March, she made her first start for New Zealand in a 3–0 win versus American Samoa.

== Honours ==
Auckland United

- New Zealand Women's National League: 2023
- NRFL Women's Premiership: 2023
