= Nikolaenko =

- Aleksandr Nikolaenko
- Aleksandra Nikolaenko
- Nikolaj Nikolaenko
- Oleg Nikolaenko, Russian computer criminal and major worldwide spammer
- Stanislav Nikolaenko
- Vita Nikolaenko

== See also ==
- Nikolayenko
