= Nikolayenko =

Nikolayenko (Ukrainian: Ніколаєнко) is a Ukrainian surname, derived from the given name Nikolay (Nicholas). Notable people with the surname include:

- Oleksandra Nikolayenko, Ukrainian model and actress
- Vitaly Nikolayenko, Russian natural scientist and photographer
- Stanislav Nikolaenko, Ukrainian politician

== See also ==
- Nikolaenko
