= Ekaterina Kovalchuk =

Belarusian footballer

Personal information
- Date of birth: 20 December 1990 (age 35)
- Place of birth: Belarus,
- Position: Goalkeeper

Team information
- Current team: Neman Grodno

Senior career*
| Years | Team | Apps | (Gls) |
| 2017-2020 | FC Minsk | 34 | (0) |
| 2021- | Neman Grodno | 0 | (0) |

International career^{‡}
| | Belarus U19 | 3 | (0) |
| 2010– | Belarus | 6 | (0) |
- * Club domestic league appearances and goals as of 4 July 2020 ‡ National team caps and goals as of 8 October 2019

Ekaterina Kovalchuk (born 20 December 1990) is a Belarusian footballer who plays as a goalkeeper for Belarusian Premier League club FC Minsk and the Belarus women's national team.
