= Yazmín Copete =

Mexican politician

- Born: 2 August 1964 (age 62); Santiago Tuxtla, Veracruz, Mexico
- Education: Universidad Veracruzana
- Political party: PRD

Yazmín de los Ángeles Copete Zapot (born 5 August 1964) is a Mexican politician affiliated with the PRD. She served as Deputy of the LXII Legislature of the Mexican Congress representing Veracruz, as well as a local deputy in the LIX Legislature of the Congress of Veracruz.
