= 2023 New Zealand Women's National League =

Football Championship

New Zealand National League
- Season: 2023
- Dates: 24 March 2023 – 26 November 2023
- Champions: Auckland United
- OFC Women's Champions League: Auckland United
- Matches: 46
- Goals: 173 (3.76 per match)
- Top goalscorer: Sofia Garcia (9 goals)
- Biggest home win: Eastern Suburbs 6–1 Central Football (29 October 2023)
- Biggest away win: Central Football 0–8 Western Springs (23 September 2023)
- Highest scoring: Central Football 0–8 Western Springs (23 September 2023)
- Longest winning run: 4 matches Eastern Suburbs; Southern United
- Longest unbeaten run: 8 matches Southern United
- Longest winless run: 7 matches Ellerslie
- Longest losing run: 7 matches Ellerslie

The 2023 New Zealand Women's National League was the third scheduled season of the new National League since its restructuring in 2021; the 2021 National League was cancelled due to the COVID-19 pandemic in northern regions. The 2023 season was the twenty-first season of national women's football and would again be a hybrid season. The competition featured four teams from the NRFL Premiership representing the Northern Conference, Central Football and two Capital Football federation sides representing the Central Conference, and Canterbury United Pride and Southern United representing the Southern Conference.

== Qualifying league ==
=== 2023 NRFL Premiership ===
NRFL Premiership
- Season: 2023
- Dates: 24 March 2023 - 27 August 2023
- Champions: Auckland United
- Relegated: Northern Rovers
- Matches: 8
- Goals: 27 (3.38 per match)
- Biggest home win: Western Springs 5–0 Hibiscus Coast (24 March 2023)
- Biggest away win: Northern Rovers 1–3 Western Springs (2 April 2023)
- Highest scoring: Western Springs 5–0 Hibiscus Coast (24 March 2023)
- All statistics correct as of 2 April 2023.

Eight teams are competing in the league – the top seven teams from the previous season and the promoted side from the 2022 NRF Championship. The promoted team is Hibiscus Coast as winners of the NRF Championship. They replaced Tauranga City.

==== Teams ====
| Team | Location | Home Ground | 2022 season |
|---|---|---|---|
| Auckland United | Mount Roskill, Auckland | Keith Hay Park | 4th |
| Eastern Suburbs | Kohimarama, Auckland | Madills Farm | 3rd |
| Ellerslie | Ellerslie, Auckland | Michaels Avenue Reserve | 5th |
| Hamilton Wanderers | Chartwell, Hamilton | Porritt Stadium | 7th |
| Hibiscus Coast | Whangaparaoa, Auckland | Stanmore Bay Park | 1st in NRF Championship (promoted) |
| Northern Rovers | Glenfield, Auckland | McFetridge Park | 1st |
| West Coast Rangers | Whenuapai, Auckland | Fred Taylor Park | 6th |
| Western Springs | Westmere, Auckland | Seddon Fields | 2nd |

==== NRFL Premiership table ====
| Pos | Team | Pld | W | D | L | GF | GA | GD | Pts | Qualification |
|---|---|---|---|---|---|---|---|---|---|---|
| 1 | Auckland United (C) | 14 | 11 | 1 | 2 | 42 | 13 | +29 | 34 | Winner of Northern League and qualification to National League Championship |
| 2 | Eastern Suburbs | 14 | 10 | 1 | 3 | 52 | 18 | +34 | 31 | Qualification to National League Championship |
| 3 | Western Springs | 14 | 7 | 3 | 4 | 42 | 22 | +20 | 24 | Qualification to National League Championship |
| 4 | Ellerslie | 14 | 7 | 2 | 5 | 23 | 21 | +2 | 23 | Qualification to National League Championship |
| 5 | West Coast Rangers | 14 | 7 | 1 | 6 | 28 | 15 | +13 | 22 | |
| 6 | Hamilton Wanderers | 14 | 5 | 1 | 8 | 18 | 34 | −16 | 16 | |
| 7 | Hibiscus Coast | 14 | 4 | 1 | 9 | 13 | 36 | −23 | 13 | |
| 8 | Northern Rovers (R) | 14 | 0 | 0 | 14 | 3 | 62 | −59 | 0 | Relegation to NRFL Women's Championship |

Source: Northern Region Football
Rules for classification: 1) Points; 2) Goal difference; 3) Goals scored; 4) Goals against; 5) Head to head; 6) Disciplinary record; 7) Coin toss
(C) Champions; (R) Relegated

==== NRFL Premiership results table ====
| Home \ Away | AU | ES | EL | HW | HC | NR | WC | WS |
|---|---|---|---|---|---|---|---|---|
| Auckland United | — | 1–4 | 3–0 | 4–1 | 3–1 | 4–0 | 3–0 | 5–1 |
| Eastern Suburbs | 3–1 | — | 3–2 | 3–0 | 3–4 | 19–1 | 0–1 | 3–2 |
| Ellerslie | 0–2 | 2–2 | — | 2–0 | 2–1 | 2–0 | 1–0 | 1–7 |
| Hamilton Wanderers | 1–2 | 3–2 | 2–1 | — | 1–0 | 2–1 | 0–2 | 1–8 |
| Hibiscus Coast | 0–4 | 1–3 | 1–1 | 2–1 | — | 1–0 | 1–5 | 0–3 |
| Northern Rovers | 0–7 | 0–3 | 0–3 | 0–3 | 0–1 | — | 0–4 | 1–3 |
| West Coast Rangers | 1–2 | 0–1 | 0–4 | 4–0 | 5–0 | 4–0 | — | 1–2 |
| Western Springs | 1–1 | 0–3 | 0–2 | 3–3 | 5–0 | 6–0 | 1–1 | — |

Source: Northern Region Football
Legend: Blue = home team win; Yellow = draw; Red = away team win.

==== NRFL Premiership scoring ====
===== NRFL Premiership top scorers =====
| Rank | Player | Club | Goals |
|---|---|---|---|
| 1 | Britney Cunningham-Lee | Ellerslie | 11 |
| 2 | Juliette Lucas | Eastern Suburbs | 10 |
| 3 | Zoe Benson | Eastern Suburbs | 8 |
| 3 | Sofia Garcia | Western Springs | 8 |
| 5 | Chelsea Elliott | Auckland United | 7 |
| 5 | Ayla Koopu | Hamilton Wanderers | 7 |
| 5 | Rene Wasi | Auckland United | 7 |
| 8 | Lara Colpi | Western Springs | 5 |
| 8 | Shannon Henson | Auckland United | 5 |
| 8 | Lily Taitimu | Western Springs | 5 |
| 8 | Sam Tawharu | Western Springs | 5 |
| 8 | Danica Urlich-Beech | Hibiscus Coast | 5 |

== Qualified teams ==
Locations of the 2023 Women's National League Teams
Location of clubs in Auckland Region for the 2023 Women's National League season

| Association | Team | Position in Regional League | App (last) | Previous best (last) |
|---|---|---|---|---|
| Northern League (4 berths) | Auckland United | 1st | 2nd (2022) | 6th (2022) |
| Northern League (4 berths) | Eastern Suburbs | 2nd | 2nd (2022) | 1st (2022) |
| Northern League (4 berths) | Western Springs | 3rd | 2nd (2022) | 2nd (2022) |
| Northern League (4 berths) | Ellerslie | 4th | 1st | Debut |
| Central League (3 berths) | Central Football | N/A | 21st (2022) | 2nd (2004) |
| Central League (3 berths) | CF Waterside Karori | N/A | 1st | Debut |
| Central League (3 berths) | CF Wellington United | N/A | 1st | Debut |
| Southern League (2 berths) | Canterbury United Pride | N/A | 21st (2022) | 1st (2020) |
| Southern League (2 berths) | Southern United | N/A | 21st (2022) | 1st (2021) |
| Wellington Phoenix (automatic berth) | Wellington Phoenix Reserves | Automatic qualification | 1st | Debut |

== Championship phase ==
=== League table ===
| Pos | Team | Pld | W | D | L | GF | GA | GD | Pts | Qualification |
|---|---|---|---|---|---|---|---|---|---|---|
| 1 | Auckland United (C) | 9 | 7 | 1 | 1 | 25 | 9 | +16 | 22 | Qualification to Grand Final and Women's Champions League group stage |
| 2 | Southern United | 9 | 7 | 1 | 1 | 22 | 6 | +16 | 22 | Qualification to Grand Final |
| 3 | Eastern Suburbs | 9 | 7 | 0 | 2 | 22 | 12 | +10 | 21 | |
| 4 | Western Springs | 9 | 6 | 1 | 2 | 28 | 11 | +17 | 19 | |
| 5 | CF Waterside Karori | 9 | 4 | 1 | 4 | 18 | 16 | +2 | 13 (Note: Tied on head to head. Disciplinary record: CF Waterside Karori 2, CF Wellington United 5) | |
| 6 | CF Wellington United | 9 | 4 | 1 | 4 | 18 | 16 | +2 | 13 | |
| 7 | Canterbury United Pride | 9 | 2 | 1 | 6 | 17 | 22 | −5 | 7 | |
| 8 | Wellington Phoenix Reserves (Note: Wellington Phoenix Reserves can not qualify for the Grand Final.) | 9 | 2 | 1 | 6 | 12 | 26 | −14 | 7 | |
| 9 | Central Football | 9 | 1 | 1 | 7 | 6 | 30 | −24 | 4 | |
| 10 | Ellerslie | 9 | 1 | 0 | 8 | 3 | 23 | −20 | 3 | |

Source: New Zealand Football
Rules for classification: 1) Points; 2) Goal difference; 3) Goals for; 4) Head to head; 5) Disciplinary record; 6) Coin toss
(C) Champions

=== Results table ===
| Home \ Away | AU | CU | CEN | CWK | CWU | ES | EL | SU | WP | WS |
|---|---|---|---|---|---|---|---|---|---|---|
| Auckland United | | 4–2 | 3–0 | | | | | 1–1 | | 1–0 |
| Canterbury United Pride | | | | 1–4 | 1–2 | 2–3 | 3–0 | | 3–1 | |
| Central Football | | 2–2 | | 1–3 | | | | 1–4 | | 0–8 |
| CF Waterside Karori | 1–3 | | | | 1–1 | | 3–0 | | 4–1 | |
| CF Wellington United | 1–4 | | 3–0 | | | 2–3 | | 0–1 | | 1–2 |
| Eastern Suburbs | 3–2 | | 6–1 | 3–0 | | | 0–1 | | | |
| Ellerslie | 0–1 | | 0–1 | | 2–5 | | | | 0–4 | |
| Southern United | | 2–1 | | 3–0 | | 0–1 | 3–0 | | | 3–2 |
| Wellington Phoenix Reserves | 1–6 | | 1–0 | | 2–3 | 0–3 | | 0–5 | | |
| Western Springs | | 4–2 | | 3–2 | | 4–0 | 3–0 | | 2–2 | |

Source: New Zealand Football
Legend: Blue = home team win; Yellow = draw; Red = away team win.

==== Positions by round ====
The table lists the positions of teams after each week of matches. To preserve chronological evolvements, any postponed matches are not included in the round at which they were originally scheduled, but added to the full round they were played immediately afterwards. For example, if a match is scheduled for round 3, but then postponed and played between rounds 6 and 7, it is added to the standings for round 6.

| Team ╲ Round | 1 | 2 | 3 | 4 | 5 | 6 | 7 | 8 | 9 |
|---|---|---|---|---|---|---|---|---|---|
| Auckland United | 3 | 6 | 5 | 2 | 1 | 3 | 3 | 1 | 1 |
| Southern United | 7 | 5 | 4 | 3 | 2 | 4 | 4 | 2 | 2 |
| Eastern Suburbs | 4 | 2 | 1 | 1 | 3 | 1 | 1 | 3 | 3 |
| Western Springs | 1 | 1 | 3 | 4 | 4 | 2 | 2 | 4 | 4 |
| CF Waterside Karori | 5 | 3 | 6 | 7 | 6 | 6 | 6 | 6 | 5 |
| CF Wellington United | 5 | 4 | 2 | 5 | 5 | 5 | 5 | 5 | 6 |
| Canterbury United Pride | 8 | 8 | 8 | 6 | 7 | 7 | 7 | 7 | 7 |
| Wellington Phoenix Reserves | 2 | 7 | 7 | 8 | 8 | 8 | 8 | 8 | 8 |
| Central Football | 10 | 10 | 9 | 9 | 9 | 9 | 9 | 9 | 9 |
| Ellerslie | 9 | 9 | 10 | 10 | 10 | 10 | 10 | 10 | 10 |

| Leader and Grand Final |
| Grand Final |

Source: New Zealand Football

=== Grand Final ===
Sunday, 26 November 2023
16:00 NZDT

| Auckland United | 2–0 | Southern United |
|---|---|---|
| Cook 24'; Dewell 57' | Report |

Mt Smart Stadium, Auckland
Referee: Anna-Marie Keighley

== Statistics ==
As of 19 November 2023

=== Top scorers ===
| Rank | Player | Club | Goals |
|---|---|---|---|
| 1 | Sofia Garcia | Western Springs | 9 |
| 2 | Charlotte Lancaster | Eastern Suburbs | 8 |
| 2 | Kaley Ward | CF Waterside Karori | 8 |
| 4 | Amy Hislop | Southern United | 7 |
| 4 | Pepi Olliver-Bell | CF Wellington United | 7 |
| 6 | Lara Colpi | Western Springs | 6 |
| 6 | Ella McCann | Wellington Phoenix Reserves | 6 |
| 8 | Nicole Cooper | Eastern Suburbs | 5 |
| 8 | Nicola Dominikovich | Canterbury United Pride | 5 |
| 8 | Nikki Furukawa | CF Waterside Karori | 5 |
| 8 | Bree Johnson | Auckland United | 5 |

== Awards ==
=== Goal of the Week ===
The goal of the week for the 2023 season included goals from the 2023 New Zealand National League (men's).

Goal of the Week
| Week | Player | Club | Ref. |
|---|---|---|---|
| 1 | N/A | | |
| 2 | Kendrah Smith | Southern United | |
| 3 | N/A | | |
| 4 | Marissa Porteous | Southern United | |
| 5 | N/A | | |
| 6 | Kaley Ward | CF Waterside Karori | |
| 7 | N/A | | |
| 8 | N/A | | |
| 9 | N/A | | |

=== Annual awards ===
Team of the season
| Goalkeeper | Aimee Hall (Auckland United) | | | |
| Defenders | Talisha Green (Auckland United) | Hannah Mackay-Wright (Southern United) | Chelsea Elliott (Auckland United) | Saskia Vosper (CF Waterside Karori) |
| Midfielders | Lara Colpi (Western Springs) | | Rose Morton (Southern United) | Zoe Benson (Eastern Suburbs) |
| Forwards | Kaley Ward (CF Waterside Karori) | | Sofia Garcia (Western Springs) | Charlotte Lancaster (Eastern Suburbs) |

== See also ==
- 2023 New Zealand National League (men's)
