= Dóra Süle =

Hungarian footballer

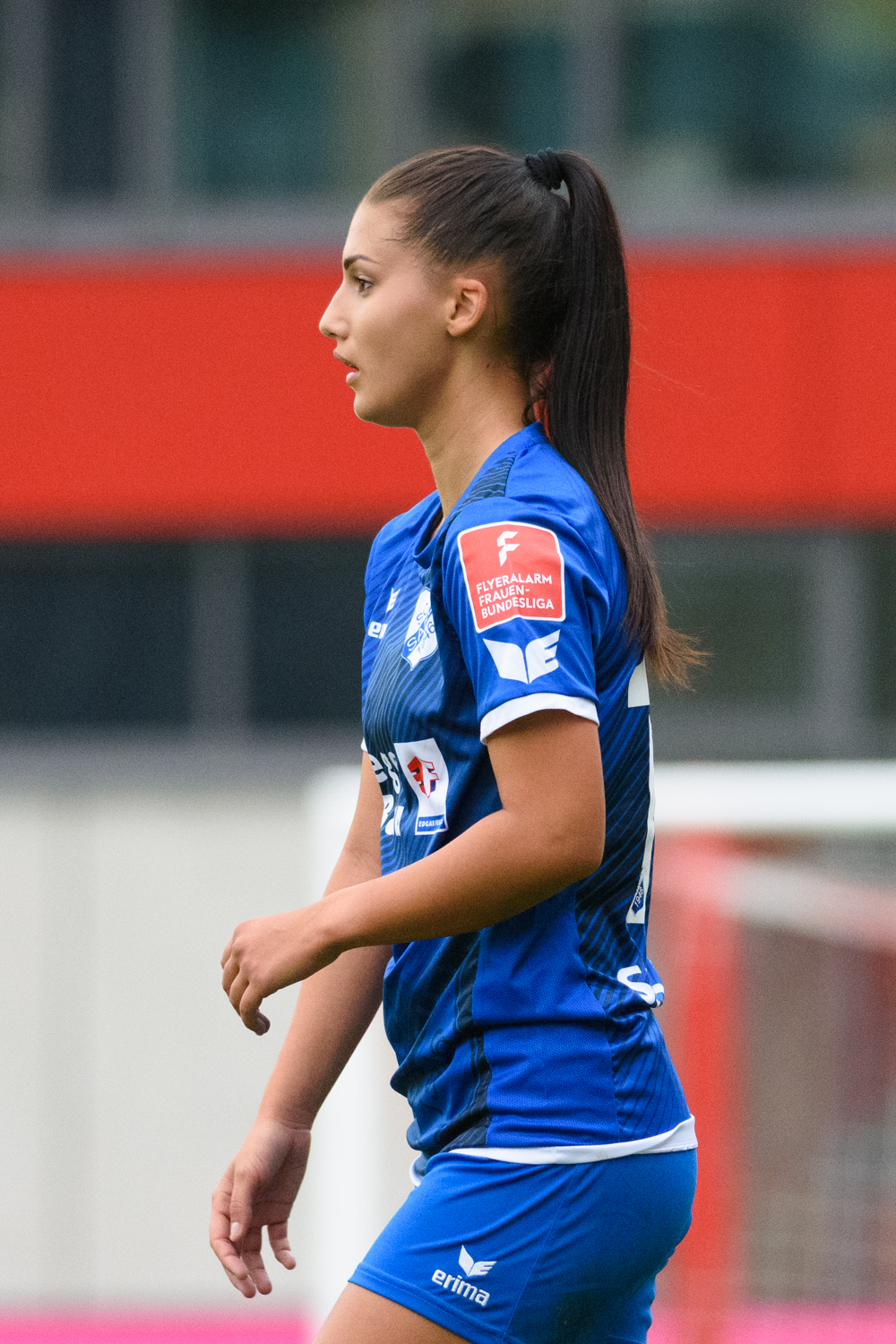
- Süle in 2020

Personal information
- Date of birth: 20 September 1998 (age 28)
- Place of birth: Győr, Hungary
- Height: 1.68 m (5 ft 6 in)
- Position: Midfielder

Team information
- Current team: Győri ETO
- Number: 16

Youth career
- 2008–2012: Győri Dózsa SE
- 2012–2017: Győri ETO

Senior career*
Years	Team	Apps	(Gls)
2013–2020	Győri ETO	0	(0)
2020	SC Sand	3	(0)
2021-	Győri ETO	0	(0)

International career
2016–2017	Hungary U19	4	(1)
2016–	Hungary	19	(3)
- * Club domestic league appearances and goals

Dóra Süle (born 20 September 1998) is a Hungarian footballer who plays as a midfielder for Női NB I club Győri ETO FC and the Hungary women's national team.

== International goals ==
No.	Date	Venue	Opponent	Score	Result	Competition
1.	10 March 2020	Gold City Sport Complex, Alanya, Turkey	Romania	6–1	7–1	2020 Turkish Women's Cup
2.	7 April 2023	Alcufer Stadion, Győr, Hungary	Israel	2–1	3–1	Friendly
