= Mirela Ganea =

Romanian footballer (born 1986)

Personal information
- Full name: Mirela Pop
- Birth name: Mirela Ganea
- Date of birth: 14 January 1986 (age 40)
- Position: Goalkeeper

Team information
- Current team: Heniu

Senior career*
Years	Team	Apps	(Gls)
- Clujana
2010–2012	Apollon		
2012–2020	Olimpia Cluj		
2020–	Heniu		

International career^{‡}
2004–	Romania	22+	(0)
- * Club domestic league appearances and goals ‡ National team caps and goals as of 12 November 2019

Mirela Pop (born 14 January 1986), née Ganea, better known as Mirela Ganea and sometimes as Mia Ganea, is a Romanian footballer who plays as a goalkeeper Liga I club ACS Heniu Prundu Bârgăului and the Romania women's national team.

== Club career ==
In February 2020, Ganea signed with ACS Heniu Prundu Bârgăului.

== Personal life ==
Ganea is married and has a son with her husband.
