= Sneha Limbu =

Hong Kong footballer

Personal information
- Full name: Sneha Limbu
- Date of birth: 2004 (age 21–22)
- Place of birth: Kowloon, Hong Kong
- Position: Forward

Team information
- Current team: Citizen

Senior career*
Years	Team	Apps	(Gls)
20??–	Citizen		

International career^{‡}
2018	Hong Kong U16	3	(1)
2020–	Hong Kong	1+	(1)
- * Club domestic league appearances and goals ‡ National team caps and goals as of 4 March 2020

Sneha Limbu is a Hong Kong professional footballer who plays as a forward for Hong Kong Women League club Citizen AA and the Hong Kong women's national team.

== Club career ==
Limbu has played for Citizen AA in Hong Kong.

== International career ==
Limbu represented Hong Kong at the 2019 AFC U-16 Women's Championship qualification and the 2020 Turkish Women's Cup.

=== International goals ===
Scores and results list Hong Kong's goal tally first

No.	Date	Venue	Opponent	Score	Result	Competition	Ref.
1	4 March 2020	Starlight Sport Complex, Antalya, Turkey	Romania	1–1	1–4	2020 Turkish Women's Cup	
