= Karen Araya =

Chilean footballer (born 1990)

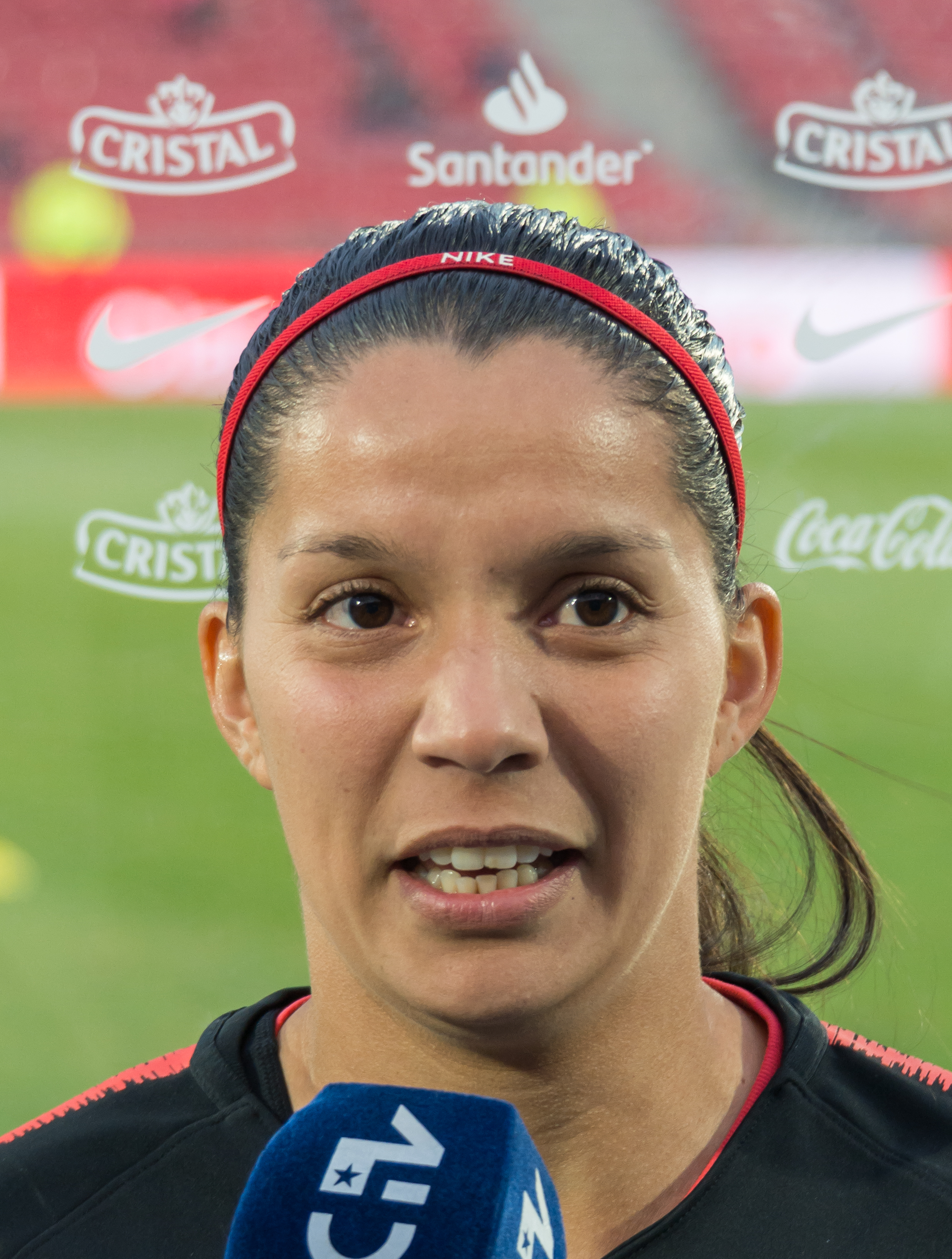
- Araya with Chile in 2019

Personal information
- Full name: Karen Andrea Araya Ponce
- Date of birth: 16 October 1990 (age 36)
- Place of birth: Puente Alto, Santiago, Chile
- Height: 1.62 m (5 ft 4 in)
- Position: Midfielder

Team information
- Current team: Universitario

Senior career*
Years	Team	Apps	(Gls)
2007–2008	Unión La Calera		
2010–2012	Colo-Colo		
2013–2016	Santiago Morning		
2016–2017	Colo-Colo		
2018	Osasco Audax	7	(1)
2018–2019	Sevilla	26	(1)
2019–2021	Santiago Morning		
2022	Sevilla	14	(1)
2022–2025	Madrid CFF	72	(11)
2025	Nantes	1	(0)
2026–	Universitario	0	(0)

International career^{‡}
2008	Chile U20	3	(0)
2006–	Chile	106	(19)
2015	Chile (futsal)		
Medal record
Women's football
Representing Chile
Pan American Games
Silver medal – second place	2023 Santiago	Team
- * Club domestic league appearances and goals as of 15 January 2026 ‡ National team caps and goals as of 00:11, 16 November 2022 (UTC)

Karen Andrea Araya Ponce (born 16 October 1990) is a Chilean professional footballer who plays as a midfielder for Peruvian Primera División club Universitario and the Chile women's national team.

== Club career ==
In 2022, Araya returned to Sevilla after her step in 2018–19 season.

In the second half 2022, Araya switched to Madrid CFF in the same division.

On 11 August 2025, Araya joined Première Ligue club Nantes on a deal for a season.

Back to South America, Araya signed with Peruvian club Universitario on 14 January 2026.

== International career ==
She represented Chile at the 2023 Pan American Games, where Chile won the silver medal. Following the semi-final match against the United States, she returned to her club, Madrid CFF.

Araya also represented the Chile national futsal team in the 2015 Copa América de Futsal Femenina.

== Personal life ==
Her younger brother, Bernardo, is a futsal player who has played for clubs in both Argentina and France and has been the Chile team captain.

== Career statistics ==
Scores and results list Chile's goal tally first, score column indicates score after each Araya goal.

List of international goals scored by Karen Araya
No.	Date	Venue	Opponent	Score	Result	Competition
1	4 March 2019	Montego Bay Sports Complex, Montego Bay, Jamaica	Jamaica	2–2	2–3	Friendly
2	5 April 2019	Pinatar Arena, San Pedro del Pinatar, Spain	Scotland	1–1	1–1	Friendly
3	4 March 2020	Starlight Sport Complex, Antalya, Turkey	Ghana	1–0	3–0	2020 Turkish Women's Cup
4	7 March 2020	Starlight Sport Complex, Antalya, Turkey	Kenya	2–0	5–0	2020 Turkish Women's Cup
5	7 March 2020	Starlight Sport Complex, Antalya, Turkey	Kenya	4–0	5–0	2020 Turkish Women's Cup
6	28 November 2020	Estadio San Carlos de Apoquindo, Santiago de Chile, Chile	Zambia	1–0	1–2	Friendly
7	24 July 2021	Sapporo Dome, Sapporo, Japan	Canada	1–2	1–2	2020 Summer Olympics
8	17 September 2021	Estadio Santa Laura-Universidad SEK, Independencia, Chile	Uruguay	2–2	2–2	Friendly
9	28 November 2021	Arena da Amazônia, Manaus, Brazil	India	3–0	3–0	2021 International Women's Football Tournament of Manaus
10	15 November 2022	Estadio Municipal de La Pintana, Santiago, Chile	Philippines	1–0	1–0	Friendly
11	26 September 2023	Quilín Complex, Santiago, Chile	New Zealand	2–1	2–1	Friendly
12	28 October 2023	Estadio Elías Figueroa Brander, Valparaíso, Chile	Jamaica	6–0	6–0	2023 Pan American Games
13	5 December 2023	Estadio Municipal de La Cisterna, Santiago, Chile	Peru	2–0	6–0	Friendly

== Honours ==
Colo-Colo

- Primera División (6): 2010, 2011 Apertura, 2011 Clausura, 2012 Apertura, 2012 Clausura, 2017 Apertura
- Copa Libertadores (1): 2012

Santiago Morning

- Primera División (2): 2019, 2020

Chile

- Copa América Runner-up: 2018
- Turkish Women's Cup: 2020
- Pan American Games Silver Medal: 2023

Individual

- CPD - Best Women's Footballer: 2012
- Premios El Gráfico - Best Women's Player: 2017
- Chilean Primera División Top Goalscorer: 2021
- Premios Contragolpe - The Best: 2021
- Premios Contragolpe - Ideal Team: 2021
- Premios América Responde - El País Best Female Player of Chile: 2021

== See also ==
- List of women's footballers with 100 or more international caps
