= 2020 Turkish Women's Cup =

Tournament details
- Host country: Turkey
- Dates: 4–10 March
- Teams: 9 (from 4 confederations)
- Venue(s): 2 (in 2 host cities)

Final positions
- Champions: Chile
- Runners-up: Hungary
- Third place: Ghana
- Fourth place: Romania

Tournament statistics
- Matches played: 12
- Goals scored: 51 (4.25 per match)
- Top scorer(s): (Chile) Karen Araya (Ghana) Grace Asantewaa (Hungary) Evelin Fenyvesi (3 goals)

The 2020 Turkish Women's Cup was the fourth edition of the Turkish Women's Cup, an invitational women's football tournament held annually in Turkey. It took place from 4 to 10 March 2020.

== Teams ==
| Team | FIFA Rankings (December 2019) |
|---|---|
| Chile | 36 |
| Romania | 43 |
| Hungary | 45 |
| Belarus | 53 |
| ~~Venezuela~~ | 58 |
| Ghana | 60 |
| Hong Kong | 74 |
| Kenya | 133 |
| (Kazakhstan) BIIK Kazygurt | Domestic team |
| Northern Ireland | Under-19 team |

Venezuela withdrew before the tournament and was replaced with BIIK Kazygurt and Belarus.

== Preliminary round ==
All times are local (UTC+3).

=== Group A ===
| Pos | Team | Pld | W | D | L | GF | GA | GD | Pts |
|---|---|---|---|---|---|---|---|---|---|
| 1 | Hungary | 3 | 3 | 0 | 0 | 13 | 2 | +11 | 9 |
| 2 | Romania | 3 | 1 | 1 | 1 | 6 | 9 | −3 | 4 |
| 3 | (Kazakhstan) BIIK Kazygurt | 2 | 1 | 0 | 1 | 7 | 2 | +5 | 3 |
| 4 | Belarus | 1 | 0 | 1 | 0 | 1 | 1 | 0 | 1 |
| 5 | Hong Kong | 3 | 0 | 0 | 3 | 1 | 14 | −13 | 0 |

Rules for classification: 1) Points; 2) Goal difference; 3) Goals scored
4 March 2020
11:00

| Hungary | 2–1 | (Kazakhstan) BIIK Kazygurt |
|---|---|---|
| Zágor 22'; L. Németh 72' | Report |

Gold City Sport Complex, Alanya
4 March 2020
15:00

| Romania | 4–1 | Hong Kong |
|---|---|---|
| Papp 8'; Predoi 29'; Rus 67'; Spânu 75' | Report (FRF); Report (HKFA) | Limbu 21' |

Starlight Sport Complex, Antalya

7 March 2020
11:00

| Hong Kong | 0–4 | Hungary |
|---|---|---|
| | Report | Kocsán 10'; Vágó 17'; H. Németh 23'; Csányi 89' |

Starlight Sport Complex, Antalya
7 March 2020
15:00

| Belarus | 1–1 | Romania |
|---|---|---|
| Shcherbachenia 29' | Report | Vătafu 58' |

Gold City Sport Complex, Alanya

10 March 2020
11:00

| Romania | 1–7 | Hungary |
|---|---|---|
| Ciolacu 1' | Report | Fenyvesi 29', 58', 60'; Vágó 54'; Csányi 65'; Süle 81'; Csiki 89' |

Gold City Sport Complex, Alanya
10 March 2020
18:00

| BIIK Kazygurt (Kazakhstan) | 6–0 | Hong Kong |
|---|---|---|
| 8'; 22'; 26'; 34'; 47'; 55' | Report |

Fanatic Football Center, Antalya

=== Group B ===
| Pos | Team | Pld | W | D | L | GF | GA | GD | Pts |
|---|---|---|---|---|---|---|---|---|---|
| 1 | Chile | 3 | 3 | 0 | 0 | 13 | 0 | +13 | 9 |
| 2 | Ghana | 3 | 2 | 0 | 1 | 7 | 4 | +3 | 6 |
| 3 | Kenya | 3 | 1 | 0 | 2 | 3 | 8 | −5 | 3 |
| 4 | Northern Ireland | 3 | 0 | 0 | 3 | 0 | 11 | −11 | 0 |

Rules for classification: 1) Points; 2) Goal difference; 3) Goals scored
4 March 2020
16:00

| Chile | 3–0 | Ghana |
|---|---|---|
| Araya 54' (pen.); Sáez 56'; Pardo 71' | Report |

Starlight Sport Complex, Antalya
4 March 2020
18:00

| Kenya | 2–0 | Northern Ireland |
|---|---|---|
| Bundi 62'; Shikangwa 75' | Report |

Gold City Sport Complex, Alanya

7 March 2020
16:00

| Kenya | 0–5 | Chile |
|---|---|---|
| | Report | Y. López 9', 83'; Araya 23', 60'; Aedo 55' |

Starlight Sport Complex, Antalya
7 March 2020
18:00

| Northern Ireland | 0–4 | Ghana |
|---|---|---|
| | Report | Adubea 18'; Sesu 33'; Asantewaa 41', 53' |

Gold City Sport Complex, Alanya

10 March 2020
15:00

| Chile | 5–0 | Northern Ireland |
|---|---|---|
| Aedo 4' (pen.); Torrealba 24'; Zamora 53'; Urrutia 60'; Pardo 73' (pen.) | Report |

Gold City Sport Complex, Alanya
10 March 2020
16:00

| Ghana | 3–1 | Kenya |
|---|---|---|
| Addo 36', 53' (pen.); Asantewaa ?' | Report | ? 90+1' |

Starlight Sport Complex, Antalya

== Goalscorers ==
There were 51 goals scored in 12 matches, for an average of 4.25 goals per match.

3 goals

- (Chile) Karen Araya
- (Ghana) Grace Asantewaa
- (Hungary) Evelin Fenyvesi

2 goals

- (Chile) Yessenia López
- (Chile) Yanara Aedo
- (Chile) Daniela Pardo
- (Ghana) Elizabeth Addo
- (Hungary) Diána Csányi
- (Hungary) Fanny Vágó

1 goal

- (Chile) Camila Sáez
- (Chile) Yazmín Torrealba
- (Chile) Daniela Zamora
- (Chile) María José Urrutia
- (Belarus) Anastasia Shcherbachenia
- (Ghana) Princella Adubea
- (Ghana) Beatrice Sesu
- (Hong Kong) Sneha Limbu
- (Hungary) Anna Júlia Csiki
- (Hungary) Petra Kocsán
- (Hungary) Hanna Németh
- (Hungary) Loretta Németh
- (Hungary) Dóra Süle
- (Hungary) Bernadett Zágor
- (Kenya) Janet Bundi
- (Kenya) Jentrix Shikangwa
- (Romania) Mihaela Ciolacu
- (Romania) Szidónia Papp
- (Romania) Denisa Predoi
- (Romania) Laura Rus
- (Romania) Florentina Spânu
- (Romania) Ștefania Vătafu
