= Anastasiya Novikova (footballer) =

Belarusian footballer

Personal information
- Date of birth: 10 December 1998 (age 27)
- Place of birth: Gomel, Belarus
- Height: 1.71 m (5 ft 7 in)
- Position: Defender

Team information
- Current team: Dinamo Minsk
- Number: 15

Senior career*
Years	Team	Apps	(Gls)
2016–2018	Zorka-BDU	39	(1)
2019	Isloch-RGUOR	20	(0)
2020-	Dinamo Minsk	30	(5)

International career^{‡}
2017-	Belarus	8	(0)
- * Club domestic league appearances and goals as of 19:45, 20 June 2021 (UTC) ‡ National team caps and goals as of 19:40, 20 June 2021 (UTC)

Anastasiya Novikova (born 10 December 1998) is a Belarusian footballer who plays as a defender for Premier League club Dinamo Minsk and the Belarus women's national team.

== Career ==
Novikova has been capped for the Belarus national team, appearing for the team during the 2019 FIFA Women's World Cup qualifying cycle.
