= Yazmín Torrealba =

Chilean footballer (born 1992)

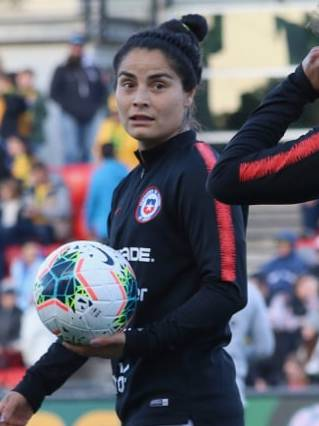
- Torrealba with Chile in 2019

Personal information
- Full name: Yazmín Colette Torrealba Valenzuela
- Date of birth: 28 May 1992 (age 34)
- Place of birth: Santiago, Chile
- Height: 1.67 m (5 ft 6 in)
- Position: Forward

Team information
- Current team: Deportes Iquique

Senior career*
Years	Team	Apps	(Gls)
- Universidad Católica
- Santiago Morning
- Universidad de Chile
–2019	Palestino		
2020	Colo-Colo		
2021	Palestino		
2022–2023	Universidad Católica	23	(4)
2024	Audax Italiano		
2025	Deportes Recoleta	17	(1)
2026–	Deportes Iquique	0	(0)

International career
2017	Chile (futsal)		
2019–2020	Chile	7	(1)
- * Club domestic league appearances and goals

Yazmín Colette Torrealba Valenzuela (born 28 May 1992) is a Chilean footballer who plays as a forward for Deportes Iquique.

== Club career ==
Torrealba rejoined Universidad Católica in 2022. In 2024, she switched to Audax Italiano.

In 2025, Torrealba played for Deportes Recoleta. The next year, she switched to Deportes Iquique.

== International career ==
As a futsal player, Torrealba represented the Chile national team in the 2017 Copa América.

As a footballer, Torrealba made her senior debut for Chile on 29 August 2019 in a 1–0 friendly win against Costa Rica.

== Personal life ==
Torrealba has a son.

== Honours ==
Chile

- Turkish Women's Cup: 2020
