= Vita Nikolaenko =

Belarusian footballer (born 1995)

Personal information
- Date of birth: 4 September 1995 (age 31)
- Place of birth: Minsk, Belarus
- Height: 1.64 m (5 ft 5 in)
- Position: Midfielder

Team information
- Current team: Dinamo Minsk

Senior career*
| Years | Team | Apps | (Gls) |
| 2011-2019 | Zorka-BDU | 105 | (10) |
| 2020- | Dinamo Minsk | 18 | (1) |

International career^{‡}
| | Belarus | 2 | (0) |
- * Club domestic league appearances and goals as of 4 May 2020 (UTC) ‡ National team caps and goals as of 4 May 2020 (UTC)

Vita Nikolaenko (born 4 September 1995) is a Belarusian footballer who plays as a midfielder for Premier League club Dinamo Minsk and the Belarus women's national team.

== Career ==
Nikolaenko has been capped for the Belarus national team, appearing for the team during the 2019 FIFA Women's World Cup qualifying cycle.
