= 1991 FIFA Women's World Cup squads =

Below are the rosters for the 1991 FIFA Women's World Cup tournament in China. The 12 national teams involved in the tournament were required to register a squad of 18 players, including at least two goalkeepers. Only players in these squads were eligible to take part in the tournament.

== Group A ==
=== China PR ===
Head coach: Shang Ruihua

No.	Pos.	Player	Date of birth (age)	Caps	Goals	Club
1	GK	Zhong Honglian	27 October 1967 (aged 24)			(Chinese Football Association) Dalian
2	DF	Chen Xia	26 November 1969 (aged 21)			(Chinese Football Association) Guangdong
3	DF	Ma Li	3 March 1969 (aged 22)			(Chinese Football Association) Beijing
4	MF	Li Xiufu (captain)	28 June 1965 (aged 26)			(Japan Football Association) Prima Ham FC
5	DF	Zhou Yang	1 February 1971 (aged 20)			(Chinese Football Association) Dalian
6	DF	Shui Qingxia	18 December 1966 (aged 24)			(Chinese Football Association) Shanghai
7	FW	Wu Weiying	19 January 1969 (aged 22)			(Chinese Football Association) Guangdong
8	MF	Zhou Hua	3 October 1969 (aged 22)			(Chinese Football Association) Dalian
9	MF	Sun Wen	6 April 1973 (aged 18)			(Chinese Football Association) Shanghai
10	MF	Liu Ailing	2 May 1967 (aged 24)			(Chinese Football Association) Beijing
11	FW	Sun Qingmei	19 June 1966 (aged 25)			(Chinese Football Association) Hebei
12	DF	Wen Lirong	2 October 1969 (aged 22)			(Chinese Football Association) Beijing
13	FW	Niu Lijie	12 April 1969 (aged 22)			(Chinese Football Association) Changchun
14	FW	Zhang Yan	6 August 1972 (aged 19)			(Chinese Football Association) Dalian
15	FW	Wei Haiying	5 January 1971 (aged 20)			(Chinese Football Association) Guangdong
16	FW	Zhang Hongdong	20 March 1969 (aged 22)			(Chinese Football Association) Beijing
17	MF	Zhu Tao	20 November 1974 (aged 16)			(Chinese Football Association) Beijing
18	GK	Li Sa	3 January 1968 (aged 23)			(Chinese Football Association) Beijing

=== Denmark ===
Head coach: Keld Gantzhorn

No.	Pos.	Player	Date of birth (age)	Caps	Goals	Club
1	GK	Helle Bjerregaard	21 June 1968 (aged 23)			(Danish Football Association) Rødovre BK
2	DF	Karina Sefron (captain)	2 July 1967 (aged 24)			(Swedish Football Association) Malmö FF
3	DF	Jannie Hansen	6 October 1963 (aged 28)			(Danish Football Association) Rødovre BK
4	DF	Bonny Madsen	10 August 1967 (aged 24)			(Swedish Football Association) Malmö FF
5	DF	Helle Rotbøll	8 October 1963 (aged 28)			(Danish Football Association) HEI Aarhus
6	DF	Mette Nielsen	15 June 1964 (aged 27)			(Danish Football Association) Vorup FB
7	MF	Susan Mackensie	24 December 1962 (aged 28)			(Danish Football Association) HEI Aarhus
8	MF	Lisbet Kolding	6 April 1965 (aged 26)			(Danish Football Association) HEI Aarhus
9	FW	Annie Gam-Pedersen	5 July 1965 (aged 26)			(Danish Football Association) Odense BK
10	FW	Helle Jensen	23 March 1969 (aged 22)			(Danish Football Association) B 1909
11	FW	Hanne Nissen	21 November 1970 (aged 20)			(Danish Football Association) Odense BK
12	MF	Irene Stelling	25 July 1971 (aged 20)			(Danish Football Association) HEI Aarhus
13	FW	Annette Thychosen	30 August 1968 (aged 23)			(Danish Football Association) Odense BK
14	MF	Marianne Jensen	14 January 1970 (aged 21)			(Danish Football Association) HEI Aarhus
15	MF	Rikke Holm	22 March 1972 (aged 19)			(Danish Football Association) B 1909
16	GK	Gitte Hansen	21 September 1961 (aged 30)			(Danish Football Association) B 1909
17	MF	Lotte Bagge	21 May 1968 (aged 23)			(Danish Football Association) B 1909
18	MF	Janne Rasmussen	18 July 1970 (aged 21)			(Danish Football Association) B 1909

=== New Zealand ===
Head coach: (England) Dave Boardman

No.	Pos.	Player	Date of birth (age)	Caps	Goals	Club
1	GK	Leslie King (captain)	13 November 1963 (aged 28)			(New Zealand Football) West Auckland
2	DF	Jocelyn Parr	5 March 1967 (aged 24)			(New Zealand Football) South Auckland
3	DF	Cinnamon Chaney	10 January 1969 (aged 22)			(New Zealand Football) Miramar
4	DF	Lynley Pedruco	11 October 1960 (aged 31)			(New Zealand Football) Eden AFC
5	MF	Deborah Pullen	20 September 1961 (aged 30)			(New Zealand Football) Glenfield Rovers
6	MF	Lorraine Taylor	20 September 1961 (aged 30)			(New Zealand Football) Nomads United
7	MF	Maureen Jacobson	7 December 1961 (aged 29)			(New Zealand Football) Miramar
8	MF	Monique van de Elzen	17 July 1967 (aged 24)			(New Zealand Football) Eden AFC
9	FW	Wendi Henderson	16 July 1971 (aged 20)			(New Zealand Football) Miramar
10	MF	Donna Baker	27 February 1966 (aged 25)			(New Zealand Football) South Auckland
11	FW	Amanda Crawford	16 February 1971 (aged 20)			(New Zealand Football) West Auckland
12	MF	Julia Campbell	1 April 1965 (aged 26)			(New Zealand Football) Nomads United
13	DF	Kim Nye	10 May 1961 (aged 30)			(New Zealand Football) Waterside Karori
14	DF	Maria George	3 March 1965 (aged 26)			(New Zealand Football) Miramar
15	DF	Terry McCahill	1 September 1970 (aged 21)			(New Zealand Football) Eden AFC
16	DF	Vivienne Robertson	18 June 1955 (aged 36)			(New Zealand Football) Glenfield Rovers
17	MF	Lynne Warring	1 December 1963 (aged 27)			(New Zealand Football) Miramar
18	GK	Anne Smith	27 September 1951 (aged 40)			(New Zealand Football) Waikato United

=== Norway ===
Head coach: Even Pellerud

No.	Pos.	Player	Date of birth (age)	Caps	Goals	Club
1	GK	Reidun Seth	9 June 1966 (aged 25)			(Swedish Football Association) GAIS
2	MF	Cathrine Zaborowski	2 August 1971 (aged 20)			(Norwegian Football Federation) Asker
3	DF	Trine Stenberg	6 December 1969 (aged 21)			(Norwegian Football Federation) Sandviken
4	MF	Gro Espeseth	30 October 1972 (aged 19)			(Norwegian Football Federation) Sandviken
5	DF	Gunn Nyborg	21 March 1960 (aged 31)			(Norwegian Football Federation) Asker
6	MF	Agnete Carlsen	15 January 1971 (aged 20)			(Norwegian Football Federation) SK Sprint/Jeløy
7	MF	Tone Haugen	6 February 1964 (aged 27)			(Norwegian Football Federation) Trondheims-Ørn
8	DF	Heidi Støre (captain)	4 July 1963 (aged 28)			(Norwegian Football Federation) SK Sprint/Jeløy
9	FW	Hege Riise	18 July 1969 (aged 22)			(Norwegian Football Federation) Setskog FK
10	FW	Linda Medalen	17 June 1965 (aged 26)			(Norwegian Football Federation) Asker
11	FW	Birthe Hegstad	23 July 1966 (aged 25)			(Norwegian Football Federation) Klepp
12	GK	Bente Nordby	23 July 1974 (aged 17)			(Norwegian Football Federation) Raufoss
13	MF	Liv Strædet	21 October 1964 (aged 27)			(Norwegian Football Federation) SK Sprint/Jeløy
14	MF	Margunn Humlestøl	25 January 1970 (aged 21)			(Norwegian Football Federation) Asker
15	MF	Anette Igland	2 October 1971 (aged 20)			(Norwegian Football Federation) Kaupanger
16	DF	Tina Svensson	16 November 1966 (aged 25)			(Norwegian Football Federation) Asker
17	FW	Ellen Scheel	26 November 1968 (aged 22)			(Norwegian Football Federation) Jardar
18	GK	Hilde Strømsvold	17 August 1967 (aged 24)			(Norwegian Football Federation) Bøler

== Group B ==
=== Brazil ===
Head coach: Fernando Pires

No.	Pos.	Player	Date of birth (age)	Caps	Goals	Club
1	GK	Meg	1 January 1956 (aged 35)			(Brazilian Football Confederation) Radar
2	DF	Rosa Lima	2 May 1964 (aged 27)			(Brazilian Football Confederation) Vasco da Gama
3	DF	Marisa (captain)	10 August 1966 (aged 25)			(Brazilian Football Confederation) Radar
4	DF	Elane	4 June 1968 (aged 23)			(Brazilian Football Confederation) Radar
5	MF	Marcinha	22 August 1962 (aged 29)			(Brazilian Football Confederation) Radar
6	MF	Fanta	14 September 1966 (aged 25)			(Brazilian Football Confederation) Radar
7	MF	Pelézinha	12 March 1964 (aged 27)			(Brazilian Football Confederation) Radar
8	DF	Solange	29 March 1969 (aged 22)			(Brazilian Football Confederation) Radar
9	FW	Adriana	26 December 1968 (aged 22)			(Brazilian Football Confederation) Radar
10	FW	Roseli	7 September 1969 (aged 22)			(Brazilian Football Confederation) Radar
11	FW	Cenira	12 February 1965 (aged 26)			(Brazilian Football Confederation) Radar
12	GK	Miriam	4 May 1965 (aged 26)			(Brazilian Football Confederation) Radar
13	MF	Márcia Taffarel	12 March 1968 (aged 23)			(Brazilian Football Confederation) Radar
14	MF	Nalvinha	14 July 1965 (aged 26)			(Brazilian Football Confederation) Radar
15	MF	Pretinha	19 May 1975 (aged 16)			(Brazilian Football Confederation) L.D.N.I.
16	DF	Doralice	23 October 1963 (aged 28)			(Brazilian Football Confederation) Radar
17	MF	Danda	1 April 1964 (aged 27)			(Brazilian Football Confederation) Radar
18	MF	Fia	1 April 1964 (aged 27)			(Brazilian Football Confederation) Radar

=== Japan ===
Head coach: Tamotsu Suzuki

No.	Pos.	Player	Date of birth (age)	Caps	Goals	Club
1	GK	Masae Suzuki	21 January 1957 (aged 34)			(Japan Football Association) Nikko Shofen
2	DF	Midori Honda	16 November 1961 (aged 30)			(Japan Football Association) Yomiuri Belleza
3	DF	Yumi Watanabe	2 July 1970 (aged 21)			(Japan Football Association) Fujita Tendai
4	DF	Mayumi Kaji	28 June 1964 (aged 27)			(Japan Football Association) Tazaki Kobe
5	DF	Sayuri Yamaguchi	25 July 1966 (aged 25)			(Japan Football Association) Suzuyo Shimizu F.C. Lovely Ladies
6	DF	Yoko Takahagi	17 April 1969 (aged 22)			(Japan Football Association) Tokyo Gakugei
7	DF	Yumi Obe	15 February 1975 (aged 16)			(Japan Football Association) Nikko Shofen
8	MF	Michiko Matsuda	26 October 1966 (aged 25)			(Japan Football Association) Prima Ham
9	FW	Akemi Noda (captain)	13 October 1969 (aged 22)			(Japan Football Association) Yomiuri Belleza
10	MF	Asako Takakura	9 April 1968 (aged 23)			(Japan Football Association) Yomiuri Belleza
11	MF	Futaba Kioka	22 November 1965 (aged 25)			(Japan Football Association) Suzuyo Shimizu F.C. Lovely Ladies
12	GK	Megumi Sakata	18 October 1971 (aged 20)			(Japan Football Association) Nissan Ladies
13	DF	Kyoko Kuroda	8 May 1970 (aged 21)			(Japan Football Association) Prima Ham
14	FW	Etsuko Handa	10 May 1965 (aged 26)			(Japan Football Association) Suzuyo Shimizu F.C. Lovely Ladies
15	FW	Kaori Nagamine	3 June 1968 (aged 23)			(Italian Football Federation) Reggiana
16	FW	Takako Tezuka	6 November 1970 (aged 21)			(Japan Football Association) Yomiuri Belleza
17	FW	Yuriko Mizuma	22 July 1970 (aged 21)			(Japan Football Association) Urawa Motobuto
18	DF	Tamaki Uchiyama	13 December 1972 (aged 18)			(Japan Football Association) Tazaki Kobe

=== Sweden ===
Head coach: Gunilla Paijkull

No.	Pos.	Player	Date of birth (age)	Caps	Goals	Club
1	GK	Elisabeth Leidinge	6 March 1957 (aged 34)	82	0	(Swedish Football Association) Jitex BK
2	DF	Malin Lundgren	3 September 1967 (aged 24)	18	1	(Swedish Football Association) Malmö FF
3	DF	Anette Hansson	2 May 1963 (aged 28)	33	3	(Swedish Football Association) Jitex BK
4	DF	Camilla Fors	24 April 1969 (aged 22)	8	0	(Swedish Football Association) Jitex BK
5	DF	Eva Zeikfalvy	18 April 1967 (aged 24)	32	0	(Swedish Football Association) Malmö FF
6	MF	Malin Swedberg	15 September 1968 (aged 23)	22	0	(Swedish Football Association) Djurgårdens IF
7	MF	Pia Sundhage (captain)	13 February 1960 (aged 31)	101	56	(Swedish Football Association) Hammarby IF
8	MF	Susanne Hedberg	26 June 1972 (aged 19)	18	4	(Swedish Football Association) Sunnanå SK
9	FW	Helen Johansson	9 July 1965 (aged 26)	57	16	(Swedish Football Association) Jitex BK
10	FW	Lena Videkull	9 December 1962 (aged 28)	55	33	(Swedish Football Association) Malmö FF
11	FW	Anneli Andelén	21 September 1968 (aged 23)	36	8	(Swedish Football Association) Öxabäck/Marks IF
12	GK	Ing-Marie Olsson	23 February 1966 (aged 25)	9	0	(Swedish Football Association) Malmö FF
13	DF	Marie Ewrelius	31 August 1967 (aged 24)	12	0	(Swedish Football Association) Djurgårdens IF
14	DF	Camilla Svensson-Gustafsson	20 January 1969 (aged 22)	4	0	(Swedish Football Association) GAIS
15	FW	Helen Nilsson	24 November 1970 (aged 20)	2	2	(Swedish Football Association) Sundsvalls DFF
16	MF	Ingrid Johansson	9 July 1965 (aged 26)	26	2	(Swedish Football Association) Jitex BK
17	MF	Marie Karlsson	4 December 1963 (aged 27)	43	2	(Swedish Football Association) Öxabäck/Marks IF
18	MF	Pärnilla Larsson	19 February 1969 (aged 22)	12	0	(Swedish Football Association) Gideonsbergs IF

=== United States ===
Head coach: Anson Dorrance

No.	Pos.	Player	Date of birth (age)	Caps	Goals	Club
1	GK	Mary Harvey	4 June 1965 (aged 26)	5	0	(United States Soccer Federation) UC Berkeley
2	FW	April Heinrichs (captain)	27 February 1964 (aged 27)	42	33	(United States Soccer Federation) University of North Carolina
3	MF	Shannon Higgins	20 February 1968 (aged 23)	26	4	(United States Soccer Federation) University of North Carolina
4	DF	Carla Werden	9 May 1968 (aged 23)	81	0	(United States Soccer Federation) University of North Carolina
5	DF	Lori Henry	20 March 1966 (aged 25)	38	3	(United States Soccer Federation) University of North Carolina
6	FW	Brandi Chastain	21 July 1968 (aged 23)	14	7	(United States Soccer Federation) Santa Clara University
7	MF	Tracey Bates	5 May 1967 (aged 24)	28	5	(United States Soccer Federation) University of North Carolina
8	DF	Linda Hamilton	4 June 1969 (aged 22)	18	0	(United States Soccer Federation) University of North Carolina
9	MF	Mia Hamm	17 March 1972 (aged 19)	43	12	(United States Soccer Federation) University of North Carolina
10	FW	Michelle Akers-Stahl	1 February 1966 (aged 25)	44	44	(United States Soccer Federation) University of Central Florida
11	MF	Julie Foudy	23 January 1971 (aged 20)	26	4	(United States Soccer Federation) Stanford University
12	FW	Carin Jennings	9 January 1965 (aged 26)	45	22	(United States Soccer Federation) UC Santa Barbara
13	MF	Kristine Lilly	22 July 1971 (aged 20)	42	9	(United States Soccer Federation) University of North Carolina
14	DF	Joy Biefeld	8 February 1968 (aged 23)	40	7	(United States Soccer Federation) UC Berkeley
15	FW	Wendy Gebauer	25 December 1966 (aged 24)	25	8	(United States Soccer Federation) University of North Carolina
16	DF	Debbie Belkin	27 May 1966 (aged 25)	48	2	(United States Soccer Federation) University of Massachusetts Amherst
17	GK	Amy Allmann	25 March 1965 (aged 26)	46	0	(United States Soccer Federation) University of Central Florida
18	GK	Kim Maslin-Kammerdeiner	12 August 1964 (aged 27)	17	0	(United States Soccer Federation) George Mason University

== Group C ==
=== Chinese Taipei ===
Head coach: Chong Tsu-pin

No.	Pos.	Player	Date of birth (age)	Caps	Goals	Club
1	GK	Hong Li-chyn	23 May 1970 (aged 21)			(Chinese Taipei Football Association) Taiwan PE College
2	MF	Liu Hsiu-mei	28 November 1972 (aged 18)			(Chinese Taipei Football Association) Taiwan PE College
3	DF	Chen Shwu-ju	2 March 1965 (aged 26)			(Chinese Taipei Football Association) Ming Chuan University
4	DF	Lo Chu-yin	6 October 1965 (aged 26)			(Chinese Taipei Football Association) Mulan
5	DF	Chen Hsiu-lin	12 December 1973 (aged 17)			(Chinese Taipei Football Association) Jinwen College
6	MF	Chou Tai-ying (captain)	16 August 1963 (aged 28)			(Japan Football Association) Suzuyo Shimizu F.C. Lovely Ladies
7	FW	Lin Mei-chun	11 January 1974 (aged 17)			(Chinese Taipei Football Association) Ming Chuan University
8	MF	Shieh Su-jean	10 February 1969 (aged 22)			(Japan Football Association) Suzuyo Shimizu F.C. Lovely Ladies
9	MF	Wu Su-ching	21 July 1970 (aged 21)			(Chinese Taipei Football Association) Taiwan PE College
10	FW	Huang Yu-chuan	17 February 1971 (aged 20)			(Chinese Taipei Football Association) Ming Chuan University
11	DF	Hsu Chia-cheng	7 June 1969 (aged 22)			(Japan Football Association) Suzuyo Shimizu F.C. Lovely Ladies
12	DF	Lan Lan-fen	22 November 1973 (aged 17)			(Chinese Taipei Football Association) Ming Chuan University
13	FW	Lin Chao-chun	31 October 1972 (aged 19)			(Chinese Taipei Football Association) Taiwan PE College
14	FW	Ko Chiao-lin	14 September 1973 (aged 18)			(Chinese Taipei Football Association) Ming Chuan University
15	DF	Wu Min-hsun	26 September 1974 (aged 17)			(Chinese Taipei Football Association) Jinwen College
16	MF	Chen Shu-chin	19 September 1974 (aged 17)			(Chinese Taipei Football Association) Jinwen College
17	MF	Lin Mei-jih	27 February 1972 (aged 19)			(Chinese Taipei Football Association) Ming Chuan University
18	GK	Lin Hui-fang	6 October 1973 (aged 18)			(Chinese Taipei Football Association) Jinwen College

=== Germany ===
Head coach: Gero Bisanz

No.	Pos.	Player	Date of birth (age)	Caps	Goals	Club
1	GK	Marion Isbert (captain)	25 February 1964 (aged 27)	52		(German Football Association) TSV Siegen
2	DF	Britta Unsleber	25 December 1966 (aged 24)	38		(German Football Association) FSV Frankfurt
3	DF	Birgitt Austermühl	8 October 1965 (aged 26)	2		(German Football Association) TSV Battenberg
4	DF	Jutta Nardenbach	13 October 1968 (aged 23)	28		(German Football Association) TuS Ahrbach
5	DF	Doris Fitschen	25 October 1968 (aged 23)	36		(German Football Association) VfR Eintracht Wolfsburg
6	DF	Frauke Kuhlmann	27 September 1966 (aged 25)	36		(German Football Association) Schmalfelder SV
7	MF	Martina Voss	22 December 1967 (aged 23)	41		(German Football Association) TSV Siegen
8	MF	Bettina Wiegmann	7 October 1971 (aged 20)	16		(German Football Association) Grün-Weiß Brauweiler
9	FW	Heidi Mohr	29 May 1967 (aged 24)	41		(German Football Association) TuS Niederkirchen
10	MF	Silvia Neid	2 May 1964 (aged 27)	61		(German Football Association) TSV Siegen
11	MF	Beate Wendt	21 September 1971 (aged 20)	4		(German Football Association) SC Poppenbüttel
12	GK	Elke Walther	1 April 1971 (aged 20)	4		(German Football Association) VfL Sindelfingen
13	MF	Roswitha Bindl	14 January 1965 (aged 26)	5		(German Football Association) FC Wacker München
14	MF	Petra Damm	20 March 1961 (aged 30)	43		(German Football Association) VfR Eintracht Wolfsburg
15	MF	Christine Paul	21 January 1965 (aged 26)	7		(German Football Association) FC Wacker München
16	FW	Gudrun Gottschlich	23 May 1970 (aged 21)	16		(German Football Association) KBC Duisburg
17	MF	Sandra Hengst	12 April 1973 (aged 18)	4		(German Football Association) KBC Duisburg
18	FW	Michaela Kubat	10 April 1972 (aged 19)	3		(German Football Association) Grün-Weiß Brauweiler

=== Italy ===
Head coach: Sergio Guenza

No.	Pos.	Player	Date of birth (age)	Caps	Goals	Club
1	GK	Stefania Antonini	10 October 1970 (aged 21)			(Italian Football Federation) Reggiana
2	DF	Paola Bonato	31 January 1961 (aged 30)			(Italian Football Federation) Reggiana
3	DF	Marina Cordenons	12 January 1969 (aged 22)			(Italian Football Federation) Pordenone
4	MF	Maria Mariotti	27 April 1964 (aged 27)			(Italian Football Federation) Reggiana
5	DF	Raffaella Salmaso	16 April 1968 (aged 23)			(Italian Football Federation) Milan '82
6	DF	Maura Furlotti	12 September 1957 (aged 34)			(Italian Football Federation) Lazio
7	FW	Silvia Fiorini	24 December 1969 (aged 21)			(Italian Football Federation) Firenze
8	MF	Federica D'Astolfo	27 October 1966 (aged 25)			(Italian Football Federation) Sassari
9	FW	Carolina Morace (captain)	5 February 1964 (aged 27)			(Italian Football Federation) Milan '82
10	MF	Feriana Ferraguzzi	20 February 1959 (aged 32)			(Royal Belgian Football Association) Standard Liège
11	MF	Adele Marsiletti	7 November 1964 (aged 27)			(Italian Football Federation) Reggiana
12	GK	Giorgia Brenzan	21 August 1967 (aged 24)			(Italian Football Federation) Sassari
13	DF	Emma Iozzelli	12 June 1966 (aged 25)			(Italian Football Federation) Reggiana
14	DF	Elisabetta Bavagnoli	3 September 1963 (aged 28)			(Italian Football Federation) Milan '82
15	MF	Anna Mega	21 October 1962 (aged 29)			(Italian Football Federation) Reggiana
16	MF	Fabiana Correra	1 October 1967 (aged 24)			(Italian Football Federation) Turris
17	FW	Nausica Pedersoli	17 April 1969 (aged 22)			(Italian Football Federation) Milan '82
18	FW	Rita Guarino	31 January 1971 (aged 20)			(Italian Football Federation) Juventus

=== Nigeria ===
Head coach: (Netherlands) Jo Bonfrère

No.	Pos.	Player	Date of birth (age)	Caps	Goals	Club
1	GK	Ann Chiejine	2 February 1974 (aged 17)			(Nigeria Football Federation) Flying Angels
2	DF	Diana Nwaiwu	10 October 1973 (aged 18)			(Nigeria Football Federation) Kakanfo Babes
3	DF	Ngozi Ezeocha	10 December 1973 (aged 17)			(Nigeria Football Federation) Princess Jegede
4	FW	Adaku Okoroafor	18 November 1974 (aged 16)			(Nigeria Football Federation) Flying Angels
5	DF	Omo-Love Branch	1 October 1974 (aged 17)			(Nigeria Football Federation) Ufuoma Babes
6	MF	Nkechi Mbilitam	4 May 1974 (aged 17)			(Nigeria Football Federation) Kakanfo Babes
7	FW	Chioma Ajunwa	25 December 1971 (aged 19)			(Nigeria Football Federation) River Mermaids
8	FW	Rita Nwadike	3 November 1974 (aged 17)			(Nigeria Football Federation) River Mermaids
9	FW	Ngozi Eucharia Uche	18 June 1973 (aged 18)			(Nigeria Football Federation) Ufuoma Babes
10	DF	Mavis Ogun	24 August 1973 (aged 18)			(Nigeria Football Federation) Ufuoma Babes
11	FW	Gift Showemimo	24 May 1974 (aged 17)			(Nigeria Football Federation) Kakanfo Babes
12	MF	Florence Omagbemi	2 February 1975 (aged 16)			(Nigeria Football Federation) Ufuoma Babes
13	MF	Nkiru Okosieme (captain)	1 March 1972 (aged 19)			(Nigeria Football Federation) S.C. Imo State
14	DF	Phoebe Ebimiekumo	17 January 1974 (aged 17)			(Nigeria Football Federation) Ufuoma Babes
15	MF	Ann Mukoro	27 April 1975 (aged 16)			(Nigeria Football Federation) Ufuoma Babes
16	GK	Lydia Koyonda	29 May 1974 (aged 17)			(Nigeria Football Federation) Ufuoma Babes
17	DF	Edith Eluma	27 September 1958 (aged 33)			(Nigeria Football Federation) Princess Jegede
18	MF	Rachael Yamala	12 February 1975 (aged 16)			(Nigeria Football Federation) Kakanfo Babes
