= Roy Cox (football manager) =

English football manager

Personal information
- Date of birth: 29 February 1936
- Place of birth: White City, England
- Date of death: 17 January 2013 (aged 76)
- Place of death: Ponsonby, Auckland, New Zealand

Youth career
- Years: Team
- Brentford
- Queens Park Rangers

Managerial career
- 1983–1987: New Zealand Women

Roy Cox (29 February 1936 – 17 January 2013) was an English former football manager. He is regarded as the "father of women's football in New Zealand".

== Early and personal life ==
Born in White City, Greater London, England, Cox played youth football for Brentford and Queens Park Rangers, but retired before playing professionally.

Cox met New Zealander Barbara Cox while the pair were working at Butlin's in Somerset in the mid-1960s and, having married, the pair moved permanently to New Zealand in 1970. He had four children, including New Zealand international footballers Michele and Tara.

== Managerial career ==
Following his move to New Zealand, Cox managed local club Eden AFC's reserve side. After his wife, Barbara, joined Eden's women's team in 1973, Cox began to take an interest in women's football in New Zealand, forming the Northern Women's Football Association (NWFA) (now the Auckland Women's Football Association) alongside Jan Innes. Following the formation of the Wellington Women's Football Association, the two associations would field teams to compete for The Roy Cox Shield.

In 1975, New Zealand were invited by Hong Kong to take part in the 1975 AFC Women's Championship, and following an agreement between the Northern, Wellington and Canterbury Football Associations, the New Zealand Women's Football Association was formed, with Cox named as its inaugural president. Despite it being the nation's first excursion in international football, New Zealand won the 1975 AFC Women's Championship.

Cox would take charge of the Auckland Women's team to take part in the National Tournament, winning 91 out of 105 games over three separate spells. He was named manager of the New Zealand women's national football team in 1983, leading the nation to the 1983 OFC Women's Championship title. The following year, New Zealand would compete at the Women's World Invitational Tournament, finishing fourth despite only losing one game - a 1–0 defeat to Bergisch Gladbach, who were representing West Germany. After another fourth-place finish at the 1987 edition of the Women's World Invitational Tournament - including a famous 1–0 win against the United States, Cox left his role.

He was later approached by Mount Wellington AFC to serve as their commercial director - a role he served alongside wife Barbara and Bob Douglas. He was named kit manager for the New Zealand men's national football team in 1992, travelling with the squad for their tour of the United Kingdom. He was awarded a Services to Sport award from Sport Auckland in 2001, and an Auckland Football Federation Long Service Medal in 2009.

== Death ==
Cox died at the Mercy Hospice in Ponsonby, Auckland, on 17 January 2013, following a five-year battle with cancer.

== Managerial statistics ==
Managerial record by team and tenure
Team	From	To	Record								PPM
Team	From	To	P	W	D	L	GF	GA	GD	Win %	PPM
New Zealand Women	1983	1987	25	14	5	6	80	12	+68	56.00	1.68
Total			25	14	5	6	80	12	+68	56.00	
