= Debbie Leonidas =

New Zealand association footballer

Personal information
- Place of birth: New Zealand

International career
Years	Team	Apps	(Gls)
1975–1981	New Zealand	19	(1)

Debbie Leonidas (née Chapman) is a former association football player who represented New Zealand at international level.

Leonidas made her Football Ferns debut in their first ever international as they beat Hong Kong 2–0 on 25 August 1975 at the inaugural AFC Women's Asian Cup, her sister Marilyn Marshall making her New Zealand debut in the same match. Leonidas finished her international career with 19 caps and 1 goal to her credit.

== Honours ==
New Zealand

- AFC Women's Championship: 1975
