= 2014 OFC Women's Nations Cup squads =

This article describes about the squads for the 2014 OFC Women's Nations Cup.

== Cook Islands ==
The squad was announced on 17 October 2014.

Head coach: Jimmy Katoa

No.	Pos.	Player	Date of birth (age)	Caps	Goals	Club
1	GK	Imelda Vakai	20 January 1997 (aged 17)	0	0	(Cook Islands Football Association) Takuvaine FC
2	DF	Linade Unuka	1 March 1996 (aged 18)	4	0	(New Zealand Football) Fencibles United
3	FW	Moeroa Harmon	1 January 2000 (aged 14)	0	0	(Cook Islands Football Association) Tupapa Maraerenga F.C.
4	FW	Rai Nganu	27 August 1995 (aged 19)	0	0	(Cook Islands Football Association) Puaikura FC
5	MF	Edwina Matenga		0	0	(Cook Islands Football Association) Titikaveka F.C.
6	DF	Jennifer Akavi	20 March 1994 (aged 20)	7	0	(Cook Islands Football Association) Nikao Sokattack F.C.
7	DF	Lee Maoate-Cox	21 March 1995 (aged 19)	0	0	(New Zealand Football) Christchurch F.C.
8	DF	Marissa Iroa	17 November 1993 (aged 20)	6	0	(Cook Islands Football Association) Tupapa Maraerenga F.C.
9	MF	Elizabeth Harmon	9 January 1992 (aged 22)	8	0	(Cook Islands Football Association) Tupapa Maraerenga F.C.
10	MF	Mama Henry	30 August 1991 (aged 23)	8	2	(New Zealand Football) Fencibles United
11	FW	Dayna Napa		8	2	(New Zealand Football) Christchurch F.C.
12	FW	Tepaeru Toka	31 March 1995 (aged 19)	5	1	(Cook Islands Football Association) Nikao Sokattack F.C.
13	DF	Marcelle Tiaore		0	0	(Cook Islands Football Association) Nikao Sokattack F.C.
14	MF	Tayla Hetherington		0	0	(New Zealand Football) Papatoetoe AFC
17	DF	Tekura Urarii		0	0	(New Zealand Football) Te Atatu AFC
18	MF	Mii Piri		8	0	(Cook Islands Football Association) Tupapa Maraerenga F.C.

== New Zealand ==
The squad was announced on 13 October 2014.

Head coach: Tony Readings

No.	Pos.	Player	Date of birth (age)	Caps	Goals	Club
1	GK	Erin Nayler	17 April 1992 (aged 22)	17	0	(New Zealand Football) Glenfield Rovers
2	DF	Ria Percival	7 December 1989 (aged 24)	91	8	(German Football Association) FF USV Jena
4	MF	Katie Hoyle	1 February 1988 (aged 26)	89	1	(The Football Association) Notts County Ladies F.C.
5	DF	Abby Erceg (c)	20 November 1989 (aged 24)	99	4	(German Football Association) FF USV Jena
6	DF	Rebekah Stott	17 June 1993 (aged 21)	25	0	(German Football Association) SC Sand
7	DF	Ali Riley	30 October 1987 (aged 26)	79	1	(Swedish Football Association) FC Rosengård
8	MF	Hayley Bowden	13 February 1984 (aged 30)	90	10	(Japan Football Association) Iwata Bonita
9	FW	Amber Hearn	28 November 1984 (aged 29)	85	36	(German Football Association) FF USV Jena
10	FW	Sarah Gregorius	6 August 1987 (aged 27)	53	18	(Japan Football Association) AS Elfen Saitama
12	MF	Betsy Hassett	4 August 1990 (aged 24)	65	6	(The Football Association) Manchester City W.F.C.
13	FW	Rosie White	6 June 1993 (aged 21)	58	11	(United States Soccer Federation) UCLA Bruins
15	DF	Meikayla Moore	4 June 1996 (aged 18)	6	0	(New Zealand Football) Coastal Spirit FC
16	MF	Annalie Longo	1 July 1991 (aged 23)	64	1	(New Zealand Football) Coastal Spirit FC
18	MF	Daisy Cleverley	30 April 1997 (aged 17)	0	0	(New Zealand Football) Forrest Hill Milford
19	MF	Evie Millynn	23 November 1994 (aged 19)	1	0	(New Zealand Football) Eastern Suburbs AFC
20	FW	Helen Collins	3 October 1988 (aged 26)	19	0	(New Zealand Football) Claudelands Rovers
21	GK	Rebecca Rolls	22 August 1975 (aged 39)	18	0	(New Zealand Football) Three Kings United
24	FW	Jasmine Pereira	20 July 1996 (aged 18)	0	0	(New Zealand Football) Three Kings United

== Papua New Guinea ==
A 22-player squad was announced on 22 September 2014.

Head coach: Gary Philips

No.	Pos.	Player	Date of birth (age)	Caps	Goals	Club
1	GK	Fidelma Watpore	9 February 1988 (aged 26)			(Papua New Guinea Football Association) Besta United PNG
2	DF	Michaella Kurabi	13 April 1996 (aged 18)			
3	FW	Yvonne Gabong	29 August 1996 (aged 18)			(Papua New Guinea Football Association) PAG Port Moresby
4	DF	Judith Gunemba	11 May 1993 (aged 21)			(Papua New Guinea Football Association) Besta United PNG
5	DF	Carolyn Obi	7 May 1995 (aged 19)			(Papua New Guinea Football Association) Sobou FC
6	FW	Grace Steven	19 February 1995 (aged 19)			(Papua New Guinea Football Association) Besta United PNG
7	MF	Barbara Muta	31 December 1982 (aged 31)			
8	FW	Fatima Rama	28 January 1981 (aged 33)			(Papua New Guinea Football Association) PAG Port Moresby
9	MF	Deslyn Siniu	2 January 1981 (aged 33)			(Papua New Guinea Football Association) PAG Port Moresby
10	MF	Sandra Birum	6 June 1992 (aged 22)			(Papua New Guinea Football Association) PAG Port Moresby
11	FW	Georgina Kaikas	10 April 1995 (aged 19)			(Papua New Guinea Football Association) Madang Fox
12	FW	Meagen Gunemba	4 June 1995 (aged 19)			(Papua New Guinea Football Association) Besta United PNG
13	MF	Daisy Winas	3 November 1986 (aged 27)			(Papua New Guinea Football Association) Sobou FC
14	DF	Dorcas Sesevo				(Papua New Guinea Football Association) PAG Port Moresby
15	FW	Zeen Limbai	4 July 1990 (aged 24)			
16	DF	Cathy Samson				(Papua New Guinea Football Association) PAG Port Moresby
17	FW	Marie Kaipu	16 August 1997 (aged 17)			(Papua New Guinea Football Association) NCD PSSA
18	MF	Rumona Morris	5 June 1995 (aged 19)			(Papua New Guinea Football Association) Madang Fox
19	DF	Talitha Irakau	28 May 1995 (aged 19)			(Papua New Guinea Football Association) Madang Fox
20	GK	Lace Kunei				(Papua New Guinea Football Association) Madang Fox

== Tonga ==
Head coach: Kilifi Uele

No.	Pos.	Player	Date of birth (age)	Caps	Goals	Club
1	GK	Lupe Likiliki				
2	FW	Ilisapeti Malekamu				
3	FW	Heilala Loto'Aniu	28 March 1991 (aged 23)			
4	MF	Vea Funaki				
5	FW	Salome Va'Enuku				
6	DF	Toliniko Kofutua	12 March 1995 (aged 19)			
7	MF	Eseta Vi	24 December 1988 (aged 25)			
8	DF	Ofaloto La'Akulu				
9	DF	Sofia Filo	3 July 1985 (aged 29)			
10	MF	Hala’unga Taholo				
11	FW	Unaloto Tahitu'a	16 January 1995 (aged 19)			
12	DF	Rebecca Kilmartin	30 September 1997 (aged 17)			(United States Soccer Federation) Moreau Catholic
13	DF	Tupou Topui				
14	DF	Mele Akolo				
15	FW	Pauline Tonga	8 March 1993 (aged 21)			
16	FW	Penateti Feke	7 January 1990 (aged 24)			
17	MF	Atelaite Manu	4 January 1981 (aged 33)			
22	GK	Suliana Uta'Atu	30 December 1991 (aged 22)			
