= Catherine Hall (disambiguation) =

Catherine Hall (born 1946) is a British feminist historian.

Catherine Hall may also refer to:

- Catherine Hall (novelist) (born 1973), English novelist
- Catherine Hall (nurse) (1922–1996), British nurse and nursing administrator
- Catherine Hall, Cambridge
- Kathy Hall (born 1956), New Zealand footballer

== See also ==
- Kathryn Hall (disambiguation)
