= 2013 Valais Women's Cup =

Valais Football Summer Cup

Tournament details
- Host country: Switzerland
- Dates: 22 September – 25 September
- Teams: 4 (from 4 confederations)
- Venue: 2 (in 2 host cities)

Final positions
- Champions: New Zealand (1st title)
- Runners-up: China
- Third place: Brazil
- Fourth place: Mexico

Tournament statistics
- Matches played: 4
- Goals scored: 10 (2.5 per match)
- Top scorer: (New Zealand) Amber Hearn

The Valais Women's Cup is a two-day international women football tournament that features four women national teams. It is played at the Stade du Lussy in Châtel-St-Denis and at the Stade St-Germain in Savièse, Switzerland.

This tournament is the closing tournament of the Valais Football Summer Cups. The first edition of the competition have been won by the New Zealand women's national football team. The New Zealanders surprisingly beat Brazil in semi-finals for the first time of its history.

Amber Hearn was the player of tournament. With 3 goals, she was the best scorer of the competition andhave been elected as best player of the tournament.

== Participants ==
The competition featured four women national teams:

- Brazil
- China
- Mexico
- New Zealand

== Competition format ==
Semi-finals; 22 September
13:30 CEST - Châtel-St-Denis
China	1
Mexico	0
16:30 CEST - Châtel-St-Denis
Brazil	0
New Zealand	1

Final; 25 September
17:30 CEST - Savièse
New Zealand	4
China	0
Third place
14:30 CEST - Savièse
Brazil	4
Mexico	0

== Matches ==
=== Semi-finals ===
22 September 2013
13:30 CEST

China	1–0	Mexico
L. Wang 66'	Report

Stade du Lussy, Châtel-St-Denis
Referee: Jenny Palmqvist, (Sweden)

22 September 2013
16:30 CEST

Brazil	0-1	New Zealand
	Report	Hearn 66'

Stade du Lussy, Châtel-St-Denis
Referee: Stéphanie Frappart (French)

=== Third place play-off ===
25 September 2013
14:30 CEST

Mexico	0-4	Brazil
	report	Fabiana 19'; Debinha 25', 41'; Tamires 80'

Stade St-Germain, Savièse
Referee: Esther Staubli,(Switzerland)

=== Final ===
25 September 2013
17:30 CEST

China	0-4	New Zealand
	Report	Wilkinson 53'; Hearn 64', 87'; White 82'

Stade St-Germain, Savièse
Referee: Simona Ghisletta, (Switzerland)

== Awards ==
- Best player : (New Zealand) Amber Hearn
- Best goalkeeper : (Brazil) Thaís Ribeiro Picarte
