= Jinwen University of Science and Technology light rail station =

Light rail station in New Taipei, Taiwan

Jinwen University of Science and Technology K05 景文科大站
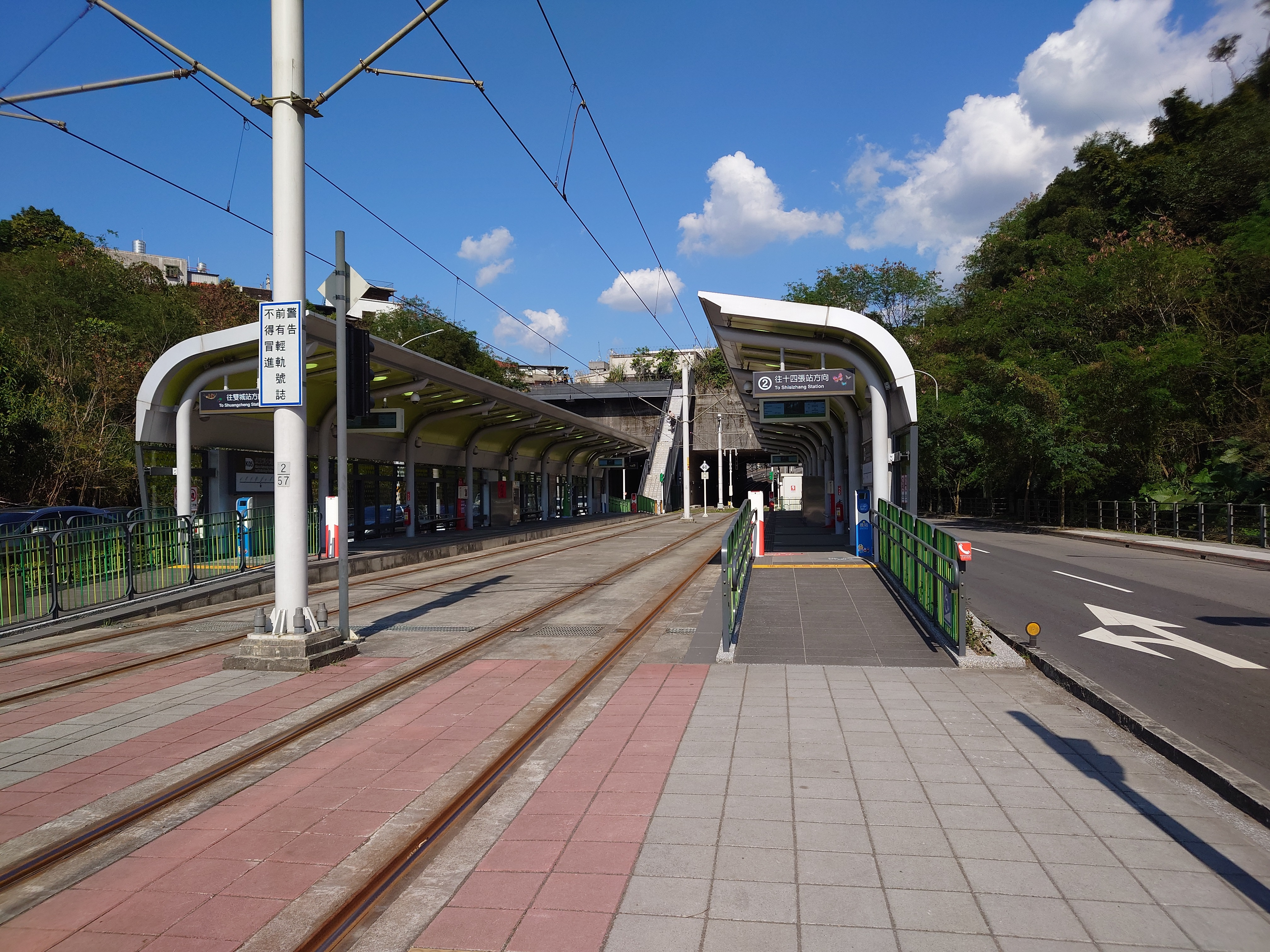
- Station exterior

General information
- Location: Xindian, New Taipei; Taiwan
- Coordinates: 24.9555°N 121.5103°E
- Operator: New Taipei Metro
- Platforms: 2 side platforms
- Connections: Bus stop

Construction
- Structure type: At-grade
- Accessible: Yes

Other information
- Station code: K05

History
- Opened: February 10, 2023

Services
Preceding station	New Taipei Metro	Following station
Cardinal Tien Hospital Ankang Branch towards Shuangcheng	Ankeng LRT	Ankang towards Shisizhang
Location

Jinwen University of Science and Technology (Chinese: 景文科大站; Pinyin: Jǐngwén kēdà zhàn) is a light rail station of the Ankeng light rail, operated by the New Taipei Metro, in Xindian, New Taipei, Taiwan.

== Station overview ==
The station is an at-grade station with two side platforms. It is located on Section 1, Anyi Road, near Anzhong Road.

== Station layout ==
Street level	Side platform, doors open on the right
Street level	← Ankeng light rail to Shuangcheng (K4 Cardinal Tien Hospital Ankang Branch)
Street level	→ Ankeng light rail to Shisizhang (K6 Ankang) →
Street level	Side platform, doors open on the right
Street level	Entrance/exit

== Around the station ==
- Jinwen University of Science and Technology
- Kang Chiao International School Qingshan Campus
- Ankang Forest Park

== Bus connections ==
Buses 897 and G10 stop at this station.

== History ==
Construction of the station started on November 7, 2014 and was completed in 2022. The station opened on February 10, 2023.

== See also ==
- Ankeng light rail
- New Taipei Metro
- Rail transport in Taiwan
