= List of international goals scored by Amber Hearn =

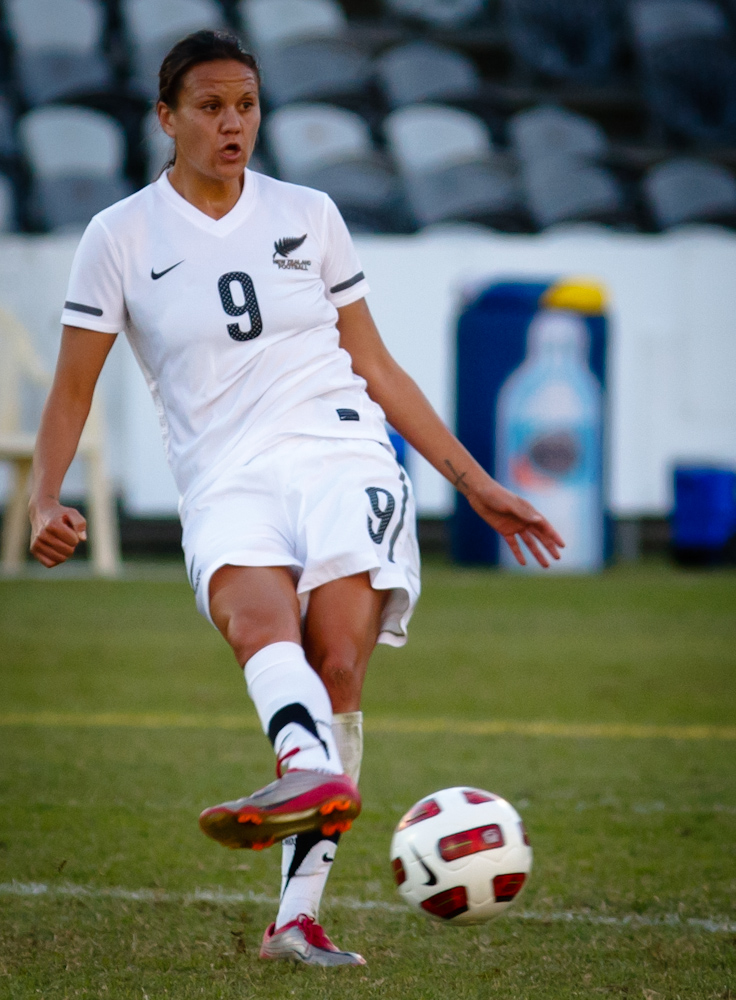
Hearn scored 54 international goals in 125 caps for New Zealand.

Amber Hearn is a New Zealand former professional footballer who represented the New Zealand women's national football team as a forward between 2004 and 2018. She scored 54 international goals in 125 caps for the "Football Ferns", making her the country's all-time top scorer. On 18 February 2004, Hearn made her debut for the senior New Zealand team aged 19 against Australia in the 2004 Australia Cup, and scored her first international goal on 16 June 2008 against Argentina in Suwon, South Korea.

Hearn scored three international hat-tricks, two against the Cook Islands and one against Vanuatu in Auckland, New Zealand. She also netted twice on eight occasions. Out of all her opponents, she scored the most against the Cook Islands, netting seven goals against the Polynesian side. Hearn scored two goals at the Olympics, 19 at the OFC Women's Nations Cup, one in the FIFA Women's World Cup and four in OFC Olympic qualification. The remainder of her goals, 28, have come in friendlies. Hearn's most productive year in terms of international goals was 2010, when she scored 16 goals in 13 games for the "Football Ferns". Over a 15-year career with New Zealand, she won the 2010 and 2014 OFC Nations Cup, scoring in the 2010 final against Papua New Guinea.

She played her final match for New Zealand against Japan on 10 June 2018 in a friendly. Hearn announced her international retirement in February 2020, citing her desire to move into coaching. "My goal was always for us to be successful on the world stage," she explained in 2020 following her announcement. Hearn often insisted that she never took notice of her record-breaking exploits in front of goal and was more concerned with helping the "Football Ferns" compete on the world stage.

== Goals ==
Scores and results list New Zealand's goal tally first, score column indicates score after each Hearn goal.

Table key
Indicates New Zealand won the match
Indicates the match ended in a draw
Indicates New Zealand lost the match

List of international goals scored by Amber Hearn
No.	Date	Venue	Opponent	Score	Result	Competition	Ref.
1	16 June 2008	Suwon World Cup Stadium, Suwon, South Korea	Argentina	1–0	1–0	2008 Peace Queen Cup	
2	6 August 2008	Qinhuangdao Olympic Sports Center Stadium, Qinhuangdao, China	Japan	2–0	2–2	2008 Summer Olympics	
3	12 January 2009	Guangdong Olympic Stadium, Guangzhou, China	South Korea	1–4	3−4	2009 Four Nations Tournament	
4	7 March 2009	GSP Stadium, Strovolos, Cyprus	Russia	2–3	2–4	2009 Cyprus Cup	
5	10 March 2009	Paralimni Stadium, Paralimni, Cyprus	Netherlands	1–0	2–0	2009 Cyprus Cup	
6	24 February 2010	GSP Stadium, Strovolos, Cyprus	Italy	1–0	1–0	2010 Cyprus Cup	
7	26 February 2010	GSP Stadium, Strovolos, Cyprus	Netherlands	1–0	1–1	2010 Cyprus Cup	
8	1 March 2010	GSZ Stadium, Larnaca, Cyprus	Scotland	1–0	3–0	2010 Cyprus Cup	
9	1 March 2010	GSZ Stadium, Larnaca, Cyprus	Scotland	3–0	3–0	2010 Cyprus Cup	
10	29 September 2010	North Harbour Stadium, Auckland, New Zealand	Vanuatu	1–0	14–0	2010 OFC Women's Championship	
11	29 September 2010	North Harbour Stadium, Auckland, New Zealand	Vanuatu	2–0	14–0	2010 OFC Women's Championship	
12	29 September 2010	North Harbour Stadium, Auckland, New Zealand	Vanuatu	3–0	14–0	2010 OFC Women's Championship	
13	29 September 2010	North Harbour Stadium, Auckland, New Zealand	Vanuatu	5–0	14–0	2010 OFC Women's Championship	
14	29 September 2010	North Harbour Stadium, Auckland, New Zealand	Vanuatu	14–0	14–0	2010 OFC Women's Championship	
15	1 October 2010	North Harbour Stadium, Auckland, New Zealand	Cook Islands	1–0	10–0	2010 OFC Women's Championship	
16	1 October 2010	North Harbour Stadium, Auckland, New Zealand	Cook Islands	5–0	10–0	2010 OFC Women's Championship	
17	1 October 2010	North Harbour Stadium, Auckland, New Zealand	Cook Islands	9–0	10–0	2010 OFC Women's Championship	
18	3 October 2010	North Harbour Stadium, Auckland, New Zealand	Tahiti	2–0	7–0	2010 OFC Women's Championship	
19	3 October 2010	North Harbour Stadium, Auckland, New Zealand	Tahiti	3–0	7–0	2010 OFC Women's Championship	
20	6 October 2010	North Harbour Stadium, Auckland, New Zealand	Solomon Islands	4–0	8–0	2010 OFC Women's Championship	
21	8 October 2010	North Harbour Stadium, Auckland, New Zealand	Papua New Guinea	10–0	11–0	2010 OFC Women's Championship final	
22	15 June 2011	St-Germain Stadium, Savièse, Switzerland	Wales	1–0	2–0	2011 Matchworld Women's Cup	
23	27 June 2011	Ruhrstadion, Bochum, Germany	Japan	1–1	1–2	2011 FIFA Women's World Cup	
24	28 February 2012	GSZ Stadium, Larnaca, Cyprus	Northern Ireland	1–0	2–0	2012 Cyprus Cup	
25	28 February 2012	GSZ Stadium, Larnaca, Cyprus	Northern Ireland	2–0	2–0	2012 Cyprus Cup	
26	6 March 2012	Dasaki Stadium, Achna, Cyprus	Netherlands	1–1	2–2 (a.e.t.) (2–4 p)	2012 Cyprus Cup	
27	31 March 2012	Okara Park, Whangārei, New Zealand	Papua New Guinea	4–0	8–0	2012 OFC Women's Olympic qualification	
28	31 March 2012	Okara Park, Whangārei, New Zealand	Papua New Guinea	8–0	8–0	2012 OFC Women's Olympic qualification	
29	17 June 2012	Centre Park, Māngere, New Zealand	China	3–1	3–1	Friendly	
30	20 June 2012	North Harbour Stadium, Auckland, New Zealand	China	1–0	1–0	Friendly	
31	17 July 2012	St-Germain Stadium, Savièse, Switzerland	Colombia	1–0	2−1	2012 Matchworld Women's Cup	
32	11 March 2013	GSZ Stadium, Larnaca, Cyprus	England	1–0	1–3	2013 Cyprus Cup	
33	22 September 2013	Stade du Lussy, Châtel-Saint-Denis, Switzerland	Brazil	1–0	1–0	2013 Valais Women's Cup	
34	25 September 2013	St-Germain Stadium, Savièse, Switzerland	China	2–0	4–0	2013 Valais Women's Cup	
35	25 September 2013	St-Germain Stadium, Savièse, Switzerland	China	4–0	4–0	2013 Valais Women's Cup	
36	15 February 2014	Yongchuan Sports Center, Chongqing, China	Mexico	1−0	1−2	2014 Four Nations Tournament	
37	25 October 2014	Kalabond Oval, Kokopo, Papua New Guinea	Tonga	14–0	16–0	2014 OFC Women's Nations Cup	
38	25 October 2014	Kalabond Oval, Kokopo, Papua New Guinea	Tonga	16–0	16–0	2014 OFC Women's Nations Cup	
39	27 October 2014	Kalabond Oval, Kokopo, Papua New Guinea	Papua New Guinea	2–0	3–0	2014 OFC Women's Nations Cup	
40	29 October 2014	Kalabond Oval, Kokopo, Papua New Guinea	Cook Islands	3–0	11–0	2014 OFC Women's Nations Cup	
41	29 October 2014	Kalabond Oval, Kokopo, Papua New Guinea	Cook Islands	7–0	11–0	2014 OFC Women's Nations Cup	
42	29 October 2014	Kalabond Oval, Kokopo, Papua New Guinea	Cook Islands	9–0	11–0	2014 OFC Women's Nations Cup	
43	29 October 2014	Kalabond Oval, Kokopo, Papua New Guinea	Cook Islands	11–0	11–0	2014 OFC Women's Nations Cup	
44	25 November 2014	Randaberg Stadion, Randaberg, Norway	Norway	1–0	1–1	Friendly	
45	3 March 2015	Estadio Pedro Escartín, Guadalajara, Spain	Spain	2–2	2–2	Friendly	
46	28 November 2015	Pacaembu Stadium, São Paulo, Brazil	Brazil	1−0	1−0	Friendly	
47	23 January 2016	PNGFA Academy, Lae, Papua New Guinea	Papua New Guinea	1–0	7–1	2016 OFC Women's Olympic qualification	
48	23 January 2016	PNGFA Academy, Lae, Papua New Guinea	Papua New Guinea	7–0	7–1	2016 OFC Women's Olympic qualification	
49	7 March 2016	Albufeira Municipal Stadium, Albufeira, Portugal	Portugal	1–0	1–0	2016 Algarve Cup	
50	9 March 2016	VRS António Sports Complex, Vila Real de Santo António, Portugal	Iceland	1–1	1–1 (a.e.t.) (5−6 p)	2016 Algarve Cup	
51	28 July 2016	Estádio Luso Brasileiro, Rio de Janeiro, Brazil	South Africa	2–0	4–1	Friendly	
52	6 August 2016	Mineirão, Belo Horizonte, Brazil	Colombia	1–0	1–0	2016 Summer Olympics	
53	1 March 2017	Ammochostos Stadium, Larnaca, Cyprus	Scotland	2–3	2–3	2017 Cyprus Cup	
54	28 November 2017	PAT Stadium, Bangkok, Thailand	Thailand	1–0	5–0	Friendly	

== Hat-tricks ==
List of international hat-tricks scored by Amber Hearn
No.	Opponent	Goals	Score	Venue	Competition	Date	Ref.
1	Vanuatu	5 – (1–0', 2–0', 3–0', 5–0', 14–0')	14–0	North Harbour Stadium, Auckland, New Zealand	2010 OFC Women's Championship	29 September 2010	
2	Cook Islands	3 – (1–0', 5–0', 9–0')	10–0	North Harbour Stadium, Auckland, New Zealand	2010 OFC Women's Championship	1 October 2010	
3	Cook Islands	4 – (3–0', 7–0', 9–0', 11–0')	11–0	Kalabond Oval, Kokopo, Papua New Guinea	2014 OFC Women's Nations Cup	29 October 2014	

== Statistics ==
Caps and goals by year
Year	Competitive		Friendly		Total	
Year	Caps	Goals	Caps	Goals	Caps	Goals
2004	—		5	0	5	0
2005	—		1	0	1	0
2006	—		0	0	0	0
2007	0	0	0	0	0	0
2008	3 (Note: Appearances in Summer Olympics)	1	6	1	9	2
2009	—		8	3	8	3
2010	5 (Note: Appearances in OFC Women's Championship/OFC Women's Nations Cup)	12	8	4	13	16
2011	3 (Note: Appearances in FIFA Women's World Cup)	1	10	1	13	2
2012	5 (Note: One appearance and two goals in OFC Women's Olympic qualification, four appearances in Summer Olympics)	2	11	6	16	8
2013	—		11	4	11	4
2014	3	7	12	2	15	9
2015	3	0	10	2	13	2
2016	4 (Note: One appearance and two goals in OFC Women's Olympic qualification, three appearances and one goal in Summer Olympics)	3	8	3	12	6
2017	—		6	2	6	2
2018	0	0	3	0	3	0
Total	26	26	99	28	125	54

Caps and goals by competition
Competition	Caps	Goals
FIFA Women's World Cup	6	1
Summer Olympics	10	2
OFC Women's Nations Cup	8	19
OFC Women's Olympic qualification	2	4
Friendlies	99	28
Total	125	54

Goals by opponent
Opponent	Goals
Cook Islands	7
Papua New Guinea	6
Vanuatu	5
China	4
Netherlands	3
Scotland	3
Brazil	2
Colombia	2
Japan	2
Northern Ireland	2
Tahiti	2
Tonga	2
Wales	1
Argentina	1
England	1
Iceland	1
Italy	1
Mexico	1
Norway	1
Portugal	1
Russia	1
Solomon Islands	1
South Africa	1
South Korea	1
Spain	1
Thailand	1
Total	54

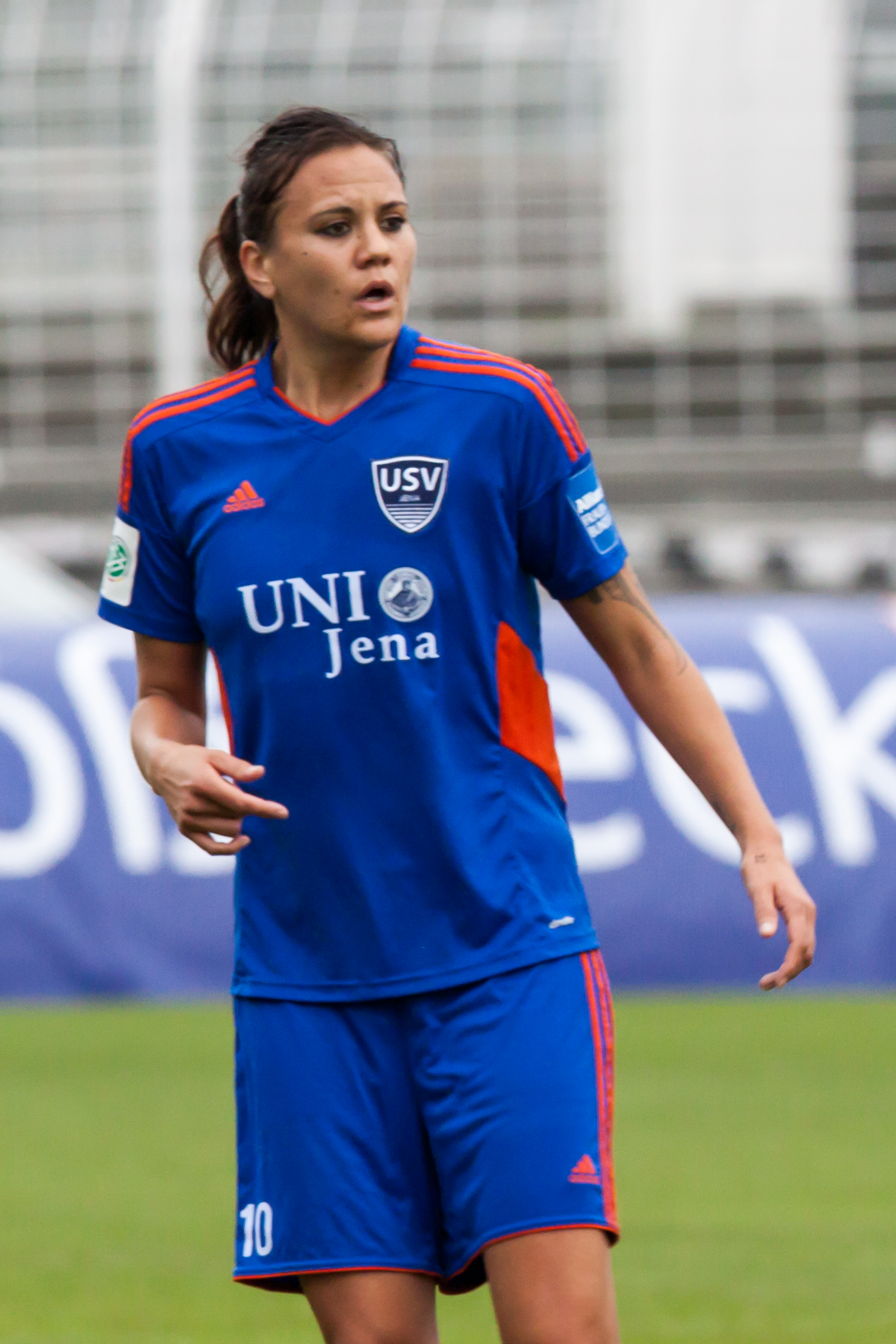
Hearn scored three international hat-tricks, twice against the Cook Islands (in 2010 and 2014) and the other against Vanuatu in 2010.

== See also ==
- List of women's footballers with 100 or more international caps
- List of top international women's football goal scorers by country
- Lists of hat-tricks
