= Elaine Lee (footballer) =

New Zealand footballer (1957–2024)

Personal information
- Full name: Elaine Joan Collins
- Birth name: Elaine Joan Kelly
- Date of birth: 22 May 1957
- Place of birth: Bromborough, Cheshire, England
- Date of death: 14 November 2024 (aged 67)
- Place of death: Auckland, New Zealand

Senior career*
Years	Team	Apps	(Gls)
1973–1975	Blockhouse Bay		
1976–1979	Eastern Suburbs		

International career
1975	New Zealand	1	(1)
- * Club domestic league appearances and goals

Elaine Joan Collins (née Kelly; 22 May 1957 – 14 November 2024), known during her playing career as Elaine Lee, was an association football player who represented New Zealand at international level.

== Early life and family ==
Lee was born Elaine Joan Kelly in Bromborough, Cheshire, England, on 22 May 1957. After her mother remarried in 1964, she used her stepfather's surname, Lee. The family migrated to New Zealand in 1971, settling in the Auckland suburb of Epsom. Lee was educated at Onehunga High School, and became a naturalised New Zealand citizen in 1978.

== Football career ==
Lee joined the Blockhouse Bay Soccer Club in 1973, becoming a member of the club's first women's team. The following year, they won both the Northern Premier Women's League and the Auckland Women's Knockout Shield.

On 30 September 1973, Lee played in the Auckland women's football team's first ever home match, against Wellington at Newmarket Park. The match programme noted that Lee worked as a delicatessen assistant, and described her as a "strong defence or attack player". Lee continued playing in the Auckland side until 1979, making 26 appearances and scoring 29 goals.

Lee made a single appearance for the national women's team in their first ever international. She came on as a substitute to score New Zealand's second goal as they beat Hong Kong 2–0 on 25 August 1975 at the inaugural AFC Women's Asian Cup. The New Zealand team went on to win the tournament.

Following the Asian Cup, Lee transferred to Eastern Suburbs AFC, where she won several league and Knockout Shield titles.

== Later life and death ==
Lee retired from football in her early 20s, and married Tony Collins, with whom she had three children. In 2023, in the lead-up to the 2023 FIFA Women's World Cup held in New Zealand and Australia, New Zealand Football presented former national women's team members, including Lee, with their New Zealand caps.

Lee died from brain cancer in Auckland on 14 November 2024, at the age of 67.
