= Isobel Richardson =

New Zealand footballer

Personal information
- Full name: Isobel Richardson

International career
| Years | Team | Apps | (Gls) |
| 1975 | New Zealand | 2 | (2) |

Isobel Richardson is a former association football player who represented New Zealand at international level.

Richardson scored two goals on her Football Ferns début in a 3–2 win over Australia on 1 September 1975 at the inaugural AFC Women's Asian Cup. Her second and final appearance was a 3–1 win over Thailand two days later at the same tournament.

== Honours ==
New Zealand

- AFC Women's Championship: 1975
