= Kathryn Hall =

Kathryn Hall may refer to:

- Kathryn T. Hall, African-American professor of medicine, geneticist and molecular biologist
- Kathryn Walt Hall, American attorney, businesswoman and former diplomat

== See also ==
- Catherine Hall (disambiguation)
- Kathy Hall
