= Nora Watkins =

New Zealand former footballer

Personal information
- Full name: Nora Watkins
- Date of birth: July 26, 1957
- Place of birth: Wellington, New Zealand
- Date of death: June 21, 2023 (aged 65)
- Place of death: Melbourne, Australia

International career
Years	Team	Apps	(Gls)
1975–1980	New Zealand	10	(2)

Managerial career
- 1989–1995: New Zealand (assistant)
- 1995: New Zealand (caretaker)

Nora Watkins (née Hetherington) (26 July 1957 – 21 June 2023) was an association football player and manager who represented New Zealand at international level.

== Club career ==
Watkins first played football for Upper Hutt before moving to Miramar Rangers with her New Zealand strike partner Marilyn Marshall after her international debut. Watkins played for their first division team until 1983 before she coached the team for five of their next seven seasons. While at Miramar, she won the Wellington Football Association competition four times and the Kelly Cup, fourteen times. She continued that success at Petone FC, winning the Central League title in 1994, 1995 and 1996.

== International career ==
Watkins made her Football Ferns debut in their first ever international as they beat Hong Kong 2–0 on 25 August 1975 at the inaugural AFC Women's Asian Cup. She finished her international career with 10 caps and 2 goal to her credit, including a penalty in New Zealand 2–0 win over Thailand in the 1975 Asian Cup Final.

== Managerial career ==
Watkins became the national team assistant coach between 1989 and 1994, including going to the 1991 FIFA Women's World Cup in China. In 1995, she took charge of the team for a two-match series against Australia, becoming the first woman to hold that position.

== Personal life ==
Watkins died in Melbourne, Australia in 2023. The Nora Watkins Memorial Shield was introduced by Capital Football in 2024 for Central League women's competitions. Waterside Karori were named the inaugural holders, having been crowned the 2023 champions. They put their name first on the trophy, defending it, in their first home game against Victoria University 1–0.

== Honours ==
Miramar Rangers

- Wellington Football Association: Champions 1975-83, 84–86, 88, 90–91
- Kelly Cup: Winners (14)

Petone FC

- Central League: Champions 1994, 1995, 1996

New Zealand

- AFC Women's Championship: 1975
