= Maria George =

New Zealand footballer

Personal information
- Full name: Maria George
- Date of birth: 3 March 1965 (age 61)
- Place of birth: New Zealand
- Position: Defender

International career
Years	Team	Apps	(Gls)
1982–1991	New Zealand	6	(0)

Maria George (born 3 March 1965) is a former New Zealand association football player who represented her country.

George made her Football Ferns debut in a 0–2 loss to Taiwan on 3 October 1982 and ended her international career with 6 caps to her credit.

George was in the New Zealand at the Women's World Cup finals in China in 1991 but did not take the field at the tournament.
