= Anne Smith (footballer) =

New Zealand footballer

Personal information
- Full name: Anne Smith
- Date of birth: 27 September 1951 (age 75)
- Place of birth: New Zealand
- Position: Goalkeeper

International career^{‡}
Years	Team	Apps	(Gls)
1984–1989	New Zealand	11	(0)
- ‡ National team caps and goals as of 15 January 2009

Anne Smith (born 27 September 1951) is a former association football player who represented New Zealand at international level.

Smith made her Football Ferns debut in a 3–0 win over a Switzerland on 8 December 1984 and ended her international career with 11 caps to her credit.

Smith made her final appearance in a 5–0 win over Papua New Guinea on 30 March 1989, she continued to be included in the squad as second goalkeeper behind Leslie King through the Women's World Cup finals in China in 1991.
