= Tara Cox =

New Zealand footballer

Personal information
- Full name: Tara Pryor
- Date of birth: 9 January 1971 (age 55)
- Place of birth: Auckland, New Zealand
- Position: Midfielder

International career
| Years | Team | Apps | (Gls) |
| 2000 | New Zealand | 4 | (0) |

Tara Pryor (née Cox) (born 9 January 1971) is an association football player who represented New Zealand.

Cox made her Football Ferns 1–2 loss to Japan on 2 June 2000, and finished her international career with 4 caps to her credit.

Cox's mother Barbara Cox and sister Michele Cox also represented New Zealand.
