= Toni Bruce =

American-New Zealand sociology academic

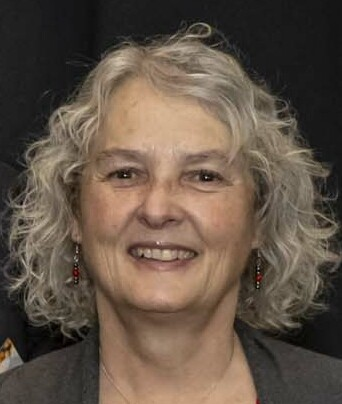
- Bruce in 2023
- Education: University of Illinois, Urbana-Champaign
- Scientific career
- Fields: Sociology of sport
- Workplaces: University of Auckland
- Thesis: What we talk about when we talk about the locker room: Women sportswriters' stories (1995)
- Doctoral students: Barbara Cox

Toni Bruce is a New Zealand sociology academic, specialising in the sociology of sport. She is currently a full professor at the University of Auckland. She gained her Masters and PhD degrees at the University of Illinois in the USA. She previously worked at the University of New Hampshire (USA) University of Canberra (Australia) and University of Waikato (New Zealand). While teaching at the University of Auckland Bruce participated in many fields of research. Her main topics involve sports media, gender issues, nationalism, race/ethnicity and disability. Bruce is an expert in many different topics including journalism, media analysis and theory, and the impacts of sociological aspects of identity on people's experiences. She supervises students throughout the Masters and the Doctorate programs that include her main topics of research.

== Academic career ==
After a 1995 PhD titled What we talk about when we talk about the locker room: Women sportswriters' stories at the University of Illinois, Urbana-Champaign, she moved to the University of Auckland, rising to full professor.

Bruce's research has been discussed in the New Zealand media and they are frequently used as expert commentators on sports issues and have written opinion pieces.

== Current ==
Toni is currently researching ethnographic fieldwork on netball fandom in New Zealand. This type of study requires her to observe and have conversations with the fans that are attending the netball games. This also requires her to observe the TV ratings and newspaper coverage of the netball sport. She is also doing a recent study of what the Rugby World Cups means to New Zealanders. She is doing so by observing studies from recent and past games during the 2015, 2011 and 2007 Cups. She is researching in particular the relationship between all blacks and other nationalities.

Selected works

- Wensing, Emma H., and Toni Bruce. "Bending the rules: Media representations of gender during an international sporting event." International review for the sociology of sport 38, no. 4 (2003): 387–396.
- Bruce, Toni. "Marking the boundaries of the ‘normal’in televised sports: The play-by-play of race." Media, Culture & Society 26, no. 6 (2004): 861–879.
- Bruce, Toni, and Christopher Hallinan. "The quest for Australian identity." Sport stars: The cultural politics of sporting celebrity 2, no. 3 (2001): 257–273.
- Bruce, Toni. "Reflections on communication and sport: On women and femininities." Communication & Sport 1, no. 1-2 (2013): 125–137.
- Bruce, Toni. "Audience frustration and pleasure: Women viewers confront televised women's basketball." Journal of Sport and Social Issues 22, no. 4 (1998): 373–397.
