= Taipei Xiaocheng light rail station =

Light rail station in New Taipei, Taiwan

Taipei Xiaocheng K03 台北小城站
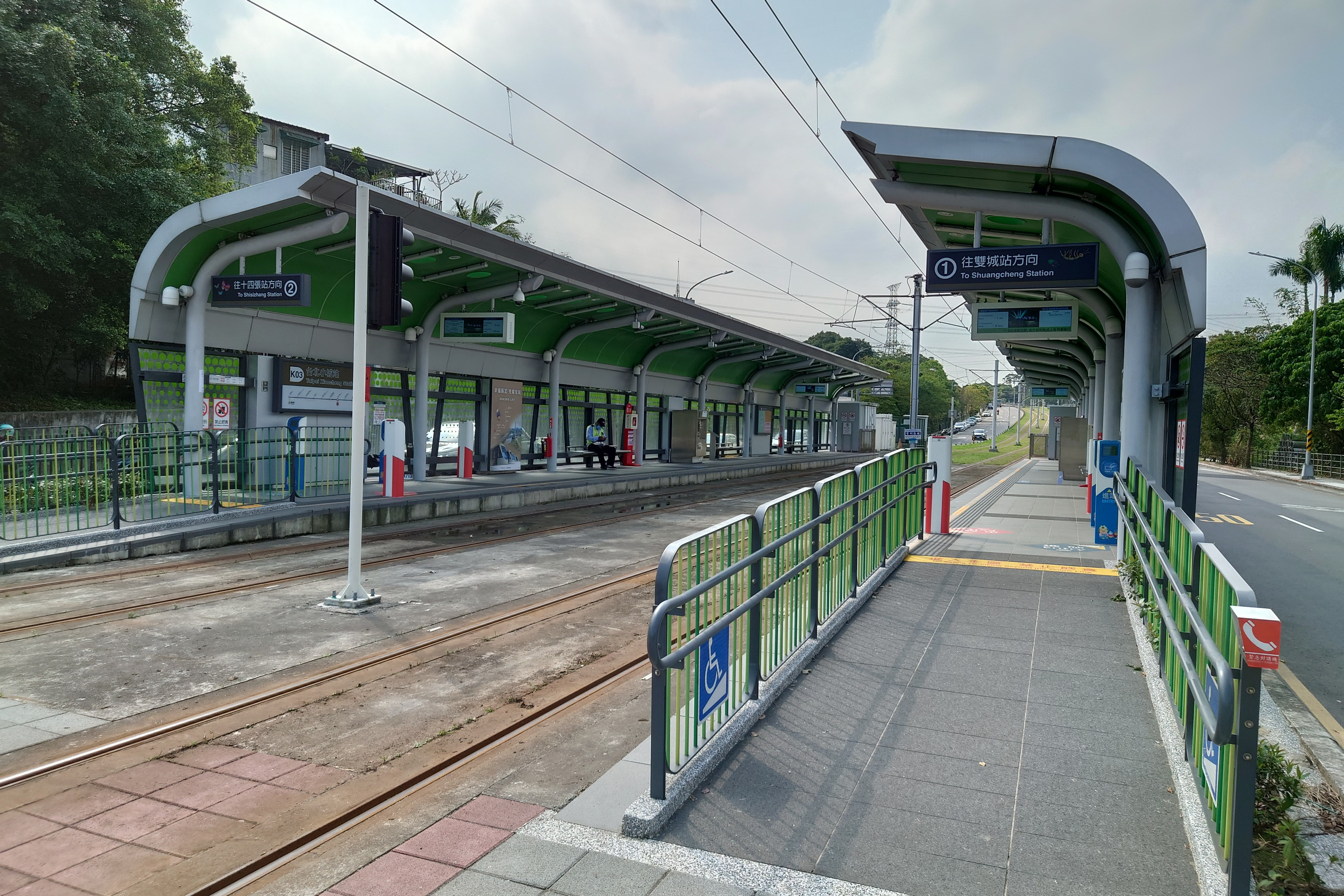
- Station exterior

General information
- Location: Xindian, New Taipei; Taiwan
- Coordinates: 24.9537°N 121.4994°E
- Operated by: New Taipei Metro
- Platforms: 2 side platforms
- Connections: Bus stop

Construction
- Structure type: At-grade
- Accessible: Yes

Other information
- Station code: K03

History
- Opened: February 10, 2023

Services
Preceding station	New Taipei Metro	Following station
Rose China Town towards Shuangcheng	Ankeng LRT	Cardinal Tien Hospital Ankang Branch towards Shisizhang
Location

Taipei Xiaocheng (Chinese: 台北小城站; Pinyin: Táiběi xiǎochéng zhàn) is a light rail station of the Ankeng light rail, operated by the New Taipei Metro, in Xindian, New Taipei, Taiwan.

== Station overview ==
The station is an at-grade station with two side platforms. It is located on Section 2, Anyi Road, near Qiaoxin Road.

== Station layout ==
Street level	Side platform, doors open on the right
Street level	← Ankeng light rail to Shuangcheng (K02 Rose China Town)
Street level	→ Ankeng light rail to Shisizhang (K04 Cardinal Tien Hospital Ankang Branch) →
Street level	Side platform, doors open on the right
Street level	Entrance/exit

== Around the station ==
- Li Qing Huanghun Market
- Xindian Refuse Incineration Plant

== Bus connections ==
Buses 779, G8, and G15 stop at this station.

== History ==
Construction of the station started in 2014 and finished in 2022, and it opened on February 10, 2023.

== See also ==
- Ankeng light rail
- New Taipei Metro
- Rail transport in Taiwan
