= Barbara Cox (footballer) =

New Zealand footballer

Barbara Cox MBE
Personal information
- Date of birth: 10 May 1947 (age 79)
- Place of birth: New Zealand
- Position: Defender

International career
Years	Team	Apps	(Gls)
1975–1987	New Zealand	34	(0)

Barbara Douglas Cox MBE (born 10 May 1947) is a former association football player who represented New Zealand.

Cox captained the New Zealand women's team in their first ever international as they beat Hong Kong 2–0 on 25 August 1975 at the inaugural AFC Women's Asian Cup. She finished her international career with 34 caps to her credit.

In the 1996 New Year Honours, Cox was appointed a Member of the Order of the British Empire, for services to soccer.

Cox has a 1998 Master's degree from the University of Auckland titled Multiple bodies : sportswomen, soccer and sexuality and a PhD completed in 2010 titled Issues of power in a history of women's football in New Zealand: A Foucauldian genealogy, under the supervision of Toni Bruce.

In 2013, Cox became a founding committee member of the independent group Friends of Football

Cox's daughters Michele Cox and Tara Cox also represented New Zealand.

== Honours ==
New Zealand

- AFC Women's Championship: 1975
