= Michele Cox =

New Zealand footballer

Personal information
- Full name: Keri-Michele Cox
- Date of birth: 9 October 1968 (age 58)
- Place of birth: Auckland, New Zealand

International career
Years	Team	Apps	(Gls)
1987–1998	New Zealand	20	(9)
Relatives	Barbara Cox (mother); Tara Cox (sister)
Academic background
Education	Auckland University of Technology
Thesis	Responsibility for children's physical activity (2012)
Doctoral advisor	Grant Schofield

Keri-Michele Cox (born 9 October 1968) is an association football player who represented New Zealand.

Cox made her Football Ferns 15–0 win over Samoa on 3 December 1987, and finished her international career with 20 caps and 9 goals to her credit.

Cox's mother Barbara Cox and sister Tara Cox also represented New Zealand.

Cox has a PhD from Auckland University of Technology with a thesis on physical activity in children.
