= Cardinal Tien Hospital Ankang Branch light rail station =

Light rail station in New Taipei, Taiwan

Cardinal Tien Hospital Ankang Branch K04 耕莘安康院區站
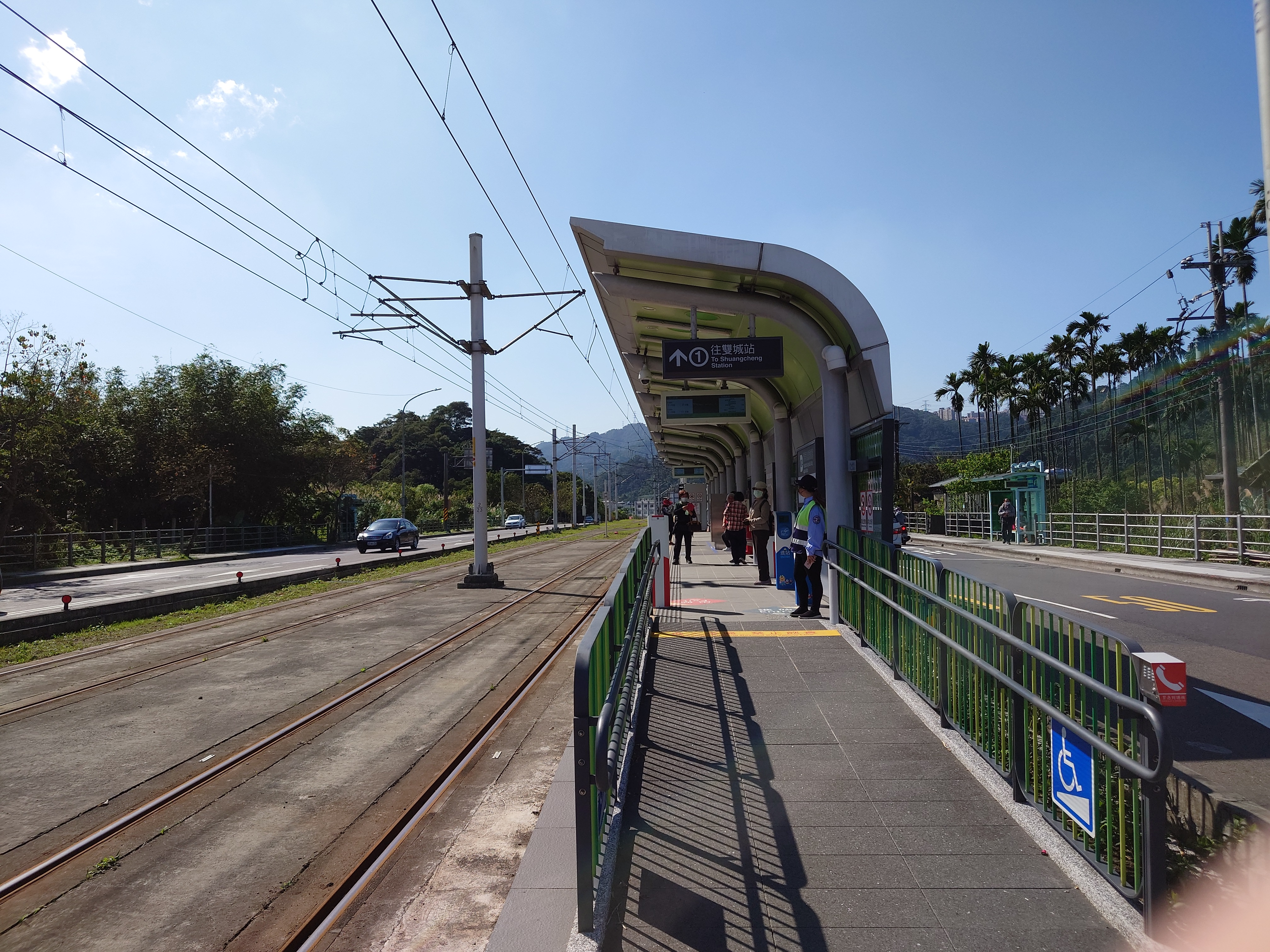
- Station exterior

General information
- Location: Xindian, New Taipei; Taiwan
- Coordinates: 24°57′16″N 121°30′17″E
- Operator: New Taipei Metro
- Platforms: 2 side platforms
- Connections: Bus stop

Construction
- Structure type: At-grade
- Accessible: Yes

Other information
- Station code: K04

History
- Opened: February 10, 2023

Services
Preceding station	New Taipei Metro	Following station
Taipei Xiaocheng towards Shuangcheng	Ankeng LRT	Jinwen University of Science and Technology towards Shisizhang
Location

Cardinal Tien Hospital Ankang Branch (Chinese: 耕莘安康院區站; Pinyin: Gēngshēn ānkāng yuànqū zhàn) is a light rail station of the Ankeng light rail, operated by the New Taipei Metro, in Xindian, New Taipei, Taiwan.

== Station overview ==
The station is an at-grade station with two side platforms. It is located on Section 2, Anyi Road, near Chezi Road.

== Station layout ==
Street level	Side platform, doors open on the right
Street level	← Ankeng light rail to Shuangcheng (K03 Taipei Xiaocheng)
Street level	→ Ankeng light rail to Shisizhang (K05 Jinwen University of Science and Technology) →
Street level	Side platform, doors open on the right
Street level	Entrance/exit

== Around the station ==
- Cardinal Tien Hospital Ankang Branch

== Bus connections ==
Buses 839, G7, and G15 stop at this station.

== History ==
Construction of the station began on November 7, 2014 and finished in 2022, and the station opened on February 10, 2023.

== See also ==
- Ankeng light rail
- New Taipei Metro
- Rail transport in Taiwan
