= Mary Harvey =

American soccer goalkeeper (born 1965)

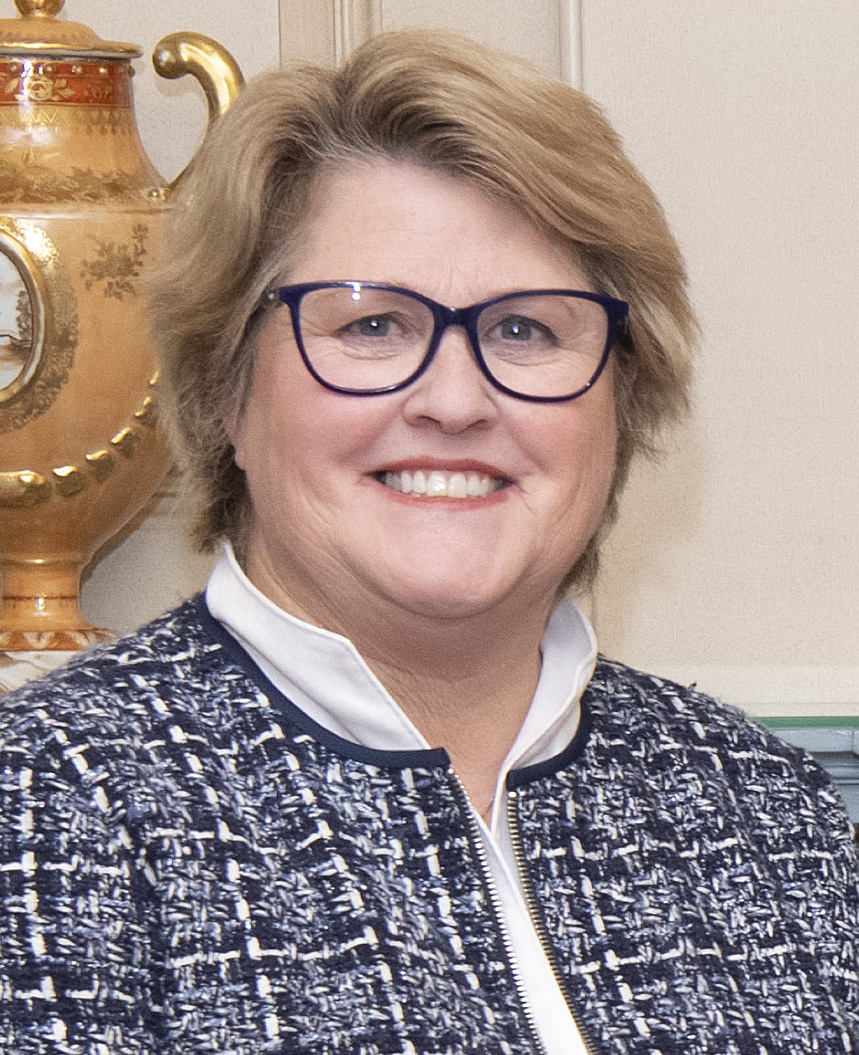
- Harvey at the White House in 2022

Personal information
- Full name: Mary Virginia Harvey
- Date of birth: June 4, 1965 (age 61)
- Place of birth: Palo Alto, California, U.S.
- Height: 5 ft 8 in (1.73 m)
- Position: Goalkeeper

College career
Years	Team	Apps	(Gls)
1983–1986	California Golden Bears		

Senior career*
Years	Team	Apps	(Gls)
1988–1991	FSV Frankfurt		
1993	Hammarby IF	2	(0)
1994	Tyresö FF		

International career
1989–1996	United States	27	(0)
Medal record
Women's soccer
Representing the United States
Olympic Games
Gold medal – first place	1996 Atlanta	Team competition
- * Club domestic league appearances and goals

Mary Virginia Harvey (born June 4, 1965) is an American retired soccer goalkeeper. She was the starting goalie for 1991 U.S. Women's National Team which won the inaugural 1991 FIFA Women's World Cup; and a member of the 1996 Olympic Gold Medal team. Harvey retired from international competition in 1996 following the Atlanta Olympics.

== Early life ==
=== Berkeley ===
Harvey earned her undergraduate degree from the University of California at Berkeley and her MBA from UCLA's Anderson School of Management.

== Playing career ==
After graduating, Harvey played semi-professional soccer in Europe. She represented FSV Frankfurt of Germany between 1988 and 1991, as well as Hammarby IF and Tyresö FF of Sweden in 1993 and 1994 respectively.

After making her debut against Poland in 1989, Harvey won 27 caps for the United States women's national soccer team. Her last appearance came in 1996 against Australia.

== Sports administration career ==
Off the field, Harvey served on U.S. Soccer's board of directors for 12 years, including 5 years on the Executive Committee; and on the U.S. Olympic Committee. In 2003, Harvey was hired by FIFA to become its Director of Development, becoming the first woman and first American hired by the international governing body to run a division. In this role, Harvey was responsible for managing the US$160 million per year development budget for FIFA, including such programs as the Financial Assistance Program, the Goal Programme, and FIFA's education or course programs. She was also responsible for FIFA's activities to develop women's soccer, futsal and beach soccer, and to oversee FIFA's sports medicine activities. Mary was involved in the reform process at FIFA and launched the #WomeninFIFA campaign with Australian Moya Dodd. The campaign was successful in achieving gender inclusion as a core tenet of the reforms passed in 2016. Prior to joining FIFA, Harvey was the CEO of a US$15 million sports and fitness company, and worked in the management consulting industry for both Deloitte. and Accenture.

In 2008, Harvey left FIFA to return to her native United States to become the chief operating officer for Women's Professional Soccer, the new women's professional soccer league in the United States. Harvey left WPS in 2010 after two seasons.

In 2017, Harvey joined the bid team to bring the 2026 FIFA World Cup to North America. Harvey was responsible for writing the United 2026 Human Rights Strategy, the first of its kind for a mega-sporting-event. The 2026 FIFA World Cup was awarded to Canada, Mexico and the United States at the 2018 FIFA Congress in Moscow.

Mary has served as a sport envoy for the U.S. State Department’s Sports Diplomacy Division on several occasions, including missions to Iraq, Jordan, Canada and Mexico. Mary also serves as the Vice Chair of the Board of Directors of the Green Sports Alliance, an organization dedicated to leveraging the cultural and market influence of sports to inspire sports leagues, teams, venues, their partners and millions of fans to embrace renewable energy, healthy food, recycling, water efficiency, species preservation, safer chemicals and other environmentally preferable practices.

She is currently the chief executive of the Center for Sport and Human Rights – a human rights organization for the world of sport.

== Honors and awards ==
Harvey's honors include:

- National Soccer Hall of Fame (2025)
- US Soccer Werner Fricker Award (2016)
- Hall of Fame, United States Olympic Committee (1996 Olympic Team)
- Medal of Honor, U.S. Soccer Hall of Fame (1991 Women's World Cup Team)
- National Goalkeeper of the year (1986)
- Hall of Fame, Cal Athletics (2000)
- Hall of Fame, American Youth Soccer Organization (2003)

== See also ==
- 1991 U.S. Women's National Team roster
