= Alison Grant =

New Zealand footballer

Personal information
- Full name: Alison Grant
- Date of birth: 9 August 1961 (age 65)
- Place of birth: Auckland, New Zealand

International career
| Years | Team | Apps | (Gls) |
| 1980–1989 | New Zealand | 37 | (11) |

Alison Grant (born 9 August 1961) is an association football player who represented New Zealand.

Grant made her Football Ferns 3–3 draw with Australia on 18 May 1980, and finished her international career with 37 caps and 11 goals to her credit.
