= Jeff Coulshed =

English football manager

Personal information
- Date of birth: 28 September 1941
- Place of birth: West Lancashire, England
- Date of death: 4 July 2017 (aged 75)
- Place of death: New Zealand
- Position: Striker

Senior career*
Years	Team	Apps	(Gls)
–1961	Skelmersdale United		
1964–1965	Hamilton AFC		
1966	Sydney Hakoah		
1967	Preston Makedonia		
1968–1978	Hamilton AFC		
1982–1983	Hamilton AFC		

Managerial career
- 1979–1981: Hamilton AFC
- 1994: New Zealand Women
- 1995–1999: Ngaruawahia United
- 2003–2005: Ngaruawahia United
- 2010: Ngaruawahia United
- * Club domestic league appearances and goals

Jeff Coulshed (28 September 1941 – 4 July 2017) was an English former football manager.

== Playing career ==
Born in West Lancashire, England, Coulshed spent his early career with Skelmersdale United, but retired following a broken ankle sustained while playing. After two years without playing, and having fallen into depression, his father suggest he emigrate, and he moved to Wellington, New Zealand in 1963. While travelling to Auckland, he stopped in Hamilton, where he was approached by Hamilton AFC life member Harold Robinson, who convinced him to play for the club.

Having played for the club in 1964 - the first year since the merger between Hamilton Technical Old Boys and Hamilton Wanderers - Coulshed was called up to a representative Waikato side. He moved to Sydney, Australia in 1966, where he played for Sydney Hakoah, and also married his wife, Judy. After two seasons in Australia, including a spell with Preston Makedonia, he returned to Waitako, rejoining Hamilton. He represented the Western Bay of Plenty District in an international friendly against the Fiji national football team on 8 September 1968. With Hamilton he won the 1972 Northern League.

== Managerial career ==
Coulshed's first foray into management came with Hamilton, whom he had spent two spells with as a player, when he succeeded Kevin Fallon in the role. In 1979 he led the club to the Northern League title, earning promotion to the 1980 New Zealand National Soccer League, where Hamilton would finish 8th out of 12 teams. In 1982 he took charge of the Waitako women's representative team, while also returning to playing.

In 1983 he suffered a brain haemorrhage and was treated at Green Lane Hospital in Auckland. Having recovered, he returned to management with the Waitako women's representative team, leading them to the 1988 and 1989 national titles - two shock results given the dominance of Auckland and Wellington at the time. He was named manager of the New Zealand women's national football team in 1994, and oversaw the nation's unsuccessful Jayalalitha Cup campaign in Madras in 1994.

He later took Ngaruawahia United to the semi-finals of the 1998 Chatham Cup, where they were defeated 2–0 by Dunedin Technical. For his achievements, he was named 1998 New Zealand Football Coach of the Year. In total, he managed Ngaruawahia in three separate spells, spanning 1995 to 2010.

== Death ==
Coulshed died on 4 July 2017.

== Managerial statistics ==
Managerial record by team and tenure
Team	From	To	Record								PPM
Team	From	To	P	W	D	L	GF	GA	GD	Win %	PPM
New Zealand Women	1994	1994	7	3	0	4	10	7	+3	42.86	1.29
Total			7	3	0	4	10	7	+3	42.86	
