= Chen Hsiu-lin =

Taiwanese footballer (born 1973)

Personal information
- Date of birth: 12 December 1973 (age 52)
- Position: Defender

Senior career*
Years	Team	Apps	(Gls)
- Jinwen College

International career^{‡}
- Chinese Taipei
- * Club domestic league appearances and goals ‡ National team caps and goals as of 16 November 1991 (before the 1991 FIFA Women's World Cup)

Chen Hsiu-lin (Chinese: 陳秀玲, born 12 December 1973) is a Taiwanese footballer who played as a defender for the Chinese Taipei women's national football team. She was part of the team at the 1991 FIFA Women's World Cup. On club level she played for Jinwen College in Taiwan.
