= Barbara Muta =

Papua New Guinean footballer

Personal information
- Date of birth: 31 December 1982 (age 43)
- Position: Midfielder

International career^{‡}
| Years | Team | Apps | (Gls) |
| 2014 | Papua New Guinea | 1 | (0) |
- ‡ National team caps and goals as of 29 October 2014

Barbara Muta (born 31 December 1982) is a Papua New Guinean footballer who plays as a midfielder. She has been a member of the Papua New Guinea women's national team.
