= Miriam Soares =

Brazilian footballer

Miriam
Personal information
- Full name: Miriam Soares
- Date of birth: 4 May 1965 (age 61)
- Position: Goalkeeper

Senior career*
Years	Team	Apps	(Gls)
- Radar

International career^{‡}
- Brazil
- * Club domestic league appearances and goals ‡ National team caps and goals as of 16 November 1991 (before the 1991 FIFA Women's World Cup)

Miriam Soares (born 4 May 1965), commonly known as Miriam, is a Brazilian footballer who played as a goalkeeper for the Brazil women's national football team. She was part of the team at the 1991 FIFA Women's World Cup. At the club level, she played for EC Radar in Brazil.
