= Judith Gunemba =

Papua New Guinean footballer

Personal information
- Date of birth: 11 May 1993 (age 33)
- Position: Defender

Senior career*
Years	Team	Apps	(Gls)
- Poro

International career^{‡}
2018	Papua New Guinea	5	(0)
- * Club domestic league appearances and goals ‡ National team caps and goals as of 1 December 2018

Judith Gunemba (born 11 May 1993) is a Papua New Guinean footballer who plays as a defender. She has been a member of the Papua New Guinea women's national team.
