= Catherine Hall (novelist) =

English novelist

Catherine Hall (born 1973) is an English novelist. She was born in a Eskdale in the Lake District and currently lives in London. She began work in documentary film production before publishing her first novel, Days of Grace, in 2009.

Catherine is the daughter of author Ian Hall and sister to businesswoman and entrepreneur Sally Fielding of Sally's Cottages.

She has two children named Nicolò and Emiliano. They were born in London in 2011 and 2013 respectively.

== Novels ==
- Days of Grace (Portobello, 2009)
- The Proof of Love 2011
- The Repercussions 2015
