= Zhang Hongdong =

Chinese footballer

Personal information
- Date of birth: 20 March 1969 (age 57)
- Position: Forward

Senior career*
Years	Team	Apps	(Gls)
- Beijing

International career^{‡}
- China
- * Club domestic league appearances and goals ‡ National team caps and goals as of 16 November 1991 (before the 1991 FIFA Women's World Cup)

Zhang Hongdong (born 20 March 1969) is a Chinese footballer who played as a forward for the China women's national football team. She was part of the team at the inaugural 1991 FIFA Women's World Cup. At the club level, she played for the team "Beijing" in China.
