= Kang Chiao International School =

- 康橋國際學校

Location
- 800 Huacheng Road [Xindian Dist.], New Taipei City, 23153; Taiwan; 24.912043°N 121.496782°E

Information
- School type: Private International School
- Established: 2002
- Average class size: 25
- Education system: IB Middle Years and Diploma Programme, AP courses and capstone Program, US Curriculum
- Classes offered: Grades 7 - 12
- Campus: Xiugang, Hsinchu, Linkou, Qingshan, and Neihu campuses in Taiwan. Kunshan, Hefei, Qujiang, Taizhou, and Changshu campusesin mainland China.
- Campus size: 4.7 hectares
- Nickname: KCIS
- Accreditation: Taiwanese Ministry of Education, Western Association of Schools and Colleges (WASC), IB World School, College Board for AP Courses
- Phone: +886-2-8665-2040
- Website: http://www.kcis.ntpc.edu.tw/

The Kang Chiao International School (KCIS) (Chinese: 康橋國際學校) is a private, coeducational private international school in New Taipei City in Taiwan and mainland China. KCIS is a subsidiary of Kang Xuan Educational Publishing Group.

The school offers International Baccalaureate (IB) and Advanced Placement (AP) curricula.

Founded in 2002, KCIS provides an international education for local and expatriate families in Taiwan. KCIS currently offers an overseas college preparatory program for grades 7-12. The junior high section of the international school was registered and started to accept students in 2004. In 2009, the high school section was officially established.
