= Patricia O'Connor (soccer) =

Australian soccer player

Pat O'Connor
Personal information
- Full name: Patricia O'Connor
- Date of birth: 11 November 1941 (age 84)
- Place of birth: Coventry, United Kingdom
- Position: Forward

Senior career*
Years	Team	Apps	(Gls)
1965–1968	Bass Hill		
1968–1970	Prague		
1971–1977	St. George		

International career
1975	Australia	4	(2)
- * Club domestic league appearances and goals

Patricia O'Connor (born 11 November 1941; in Coventry, United Kingdom) was the captain of the first Australia women's national soccer team in the mid-1970s. O'Connor was also captain of the St George Budapest Women's Football team which, at that time, had been unbeaten in competitive games in the NSW Women's Soccer competition.

O'Connor migrated to Sydney with her family in 1963. She was the foundation member and also captained the Bass Hill women's team in 1965. She joined Prague women in 1968 and played for them till 1970. O'Connor, along with her husband Joe O'Connor, was a central figure in the organisation and running of the first Sydney-wide women's soccer league and the National Women's Soccer Championships, the initial inter-state women's soccer state championships in 1974. They also formed the St George women's team.

O'Connor was also captain of the NSW Women's Soccer representative team during the mid-1970s and captain of the Western Australia Women's Soccer team in 1978.

She captained the first Matildas' team who played in the first Asian Cup in 1975 in Hong Kong. She was capped four times for Australia and had the distinction of scoring the first official goal for the Matildas when she netted in a 3–2 loss to Thailand in the first game of that Asian Cup. In 2001 she was awarded a Medal of Excellence from the Soccer Australia Hall of Fame (later renamed Football Australia Hall of Fame).
