= Lin Chao-chun =

Chinese football player from Taiwan

Personal information
- Date of birth: 31 October 1972 (age 54)
- Position: Forward

Senior career*
Years	Team	Apps	(Gls)
- Taiwan PE College

International career^{‡}
- Chinese Taipei
- * Club domestic league appearances and goals ‡ National team caps and goals as of 16 November 1991 (before the 1991 FIFA Women's World Cup)

Lin Chao-chun (Chinese: 林昭君, born 31 October 1972) is a Taiwanese footballer who played as a forward for the Chinese Taipei women's national football team. She was part of the team at the 1991 FIFA Women's World Cup. On club level she played for Taiwan PE College in Taiwan.
