= Kathy Hall =

New Zealand footballer

Personal information
- Full name: Kathy Hall
- Date of birth: 28 August 1956 (age 70)
- Place of birth: New Zealand

International career
Years	Team	Apps	(Gls)
1975–1986	New Zealand	16	(3)

Kathy Hall (née Simeonoff) (born 28 August 1956 in New Zealand) is a former association football and softball player who represented New Zealand at international level.

Hall made her Football Ferns debut in their first ever international as they beat Hong Kong 2–0 on 25 August 1975 at the inaugural AFC Women's Asian Cup. She finished her international career with 16 caps and 3 goal to her credit.

== Honours ==
New Zealand

- AFC Women's Championship: 1975
