= Lin Hui-fang =

Chinese football player from Taiwan

Personal information
- Date of birth: 6 October 1973 (age 53)
- Position: Goalkeeper

Senior career*
Years	Team	Apps	(Gls)
- Jinwen College

International career^{‡}
- Chinese Taipei
- * Club domestic league appearances and goals ‡ National team caps and goals as of 16 November 1991 (before the 1991 FIFA Women's World Cup)

Lin Hui-fang (Chinese: 林惠芳, born 6 October 1973) is a Taiwanese footballer who played as a goalkeeper for the Chinese Taipei women's national football team. She was part of the team at the 1991 FIFA Women's World Cup. On club level she played for Jinwen College in Taiwan.
