= Vivienne Robertson =

New Zealand footballer

Personal information
- Full name: Vivienne Robertson
- Date of birth: 18 June 1955 (age 71)
- Place of birth: New Zealand
- Position: Defender

International career^{‡}
Years	Team	Apps	(Gls)
1989–1991	New Zealand	36	(8)
- ‡ National team caps and goals as of 15 January 2009

Vivienne Robertson (born 18 June 1955) is a former association football player who represented New Zealand at international level.

Robertson made her Football Ferns debut in a 2–1 loss to Australia on 4 October 1981 and ended her international career with 36 caps and 8 goals to her credit.

Robertson was in the New Zealand squad for the Women's World Cup finals in China in 1991, but did not take the field at the finals tournament.
