= Lydia Koyonda =

Nigerian footballer

Personal information
- Date of birth: 29 May 1974 (age 52)
- Position: Goalkeeper

Senior career*
Years	Team	Apps	(Gls)
- Ufuoma Babes

International career^{‡}
- Nigeria
- * Club domestic league appearances and goals ‡ National team caps and goals as of 16 November 1991 (before the 1991 FIFA Women's World Cup)

Lydia Koyonda (born 29 May 1974) is a former football goalkeeper who played for the Nigeria women's national football team. She was part of the team at the inaugural 1991 FIFA Women's World Cup. At the club level, she played for Ufuoma Babes in Nigeria.
