= Marilyn Marshall (footballer) =

New Zealand footballer and softball player

Personal information
- Full name: Marilyn Marshall
- Place of birth: New Zealand

International career
Years	Team	Apps	(Gls)
1975–1981	New Zealand	18	(9)

Marilyn Marshall is a former association football player and softball player who represented New Zealand at international level.

Marshall made her Football Ferns debut in their first ever international as they beat Hong Kong 2–0 on 25 August 1975 at the inaugural AFC Women's Asian Cup, her sister Debbie Leonidas making her New Zealand debut in the same match. She has the distinction of scoring New Zealand's first ever women's international goal and finished her international career with 18 caps and 9 goals to her credit.

== Honours ==
New Zealand

- AFC Women's Championship: 1975
