= Amber Hearn =

New Zealand footballer (born 1984)

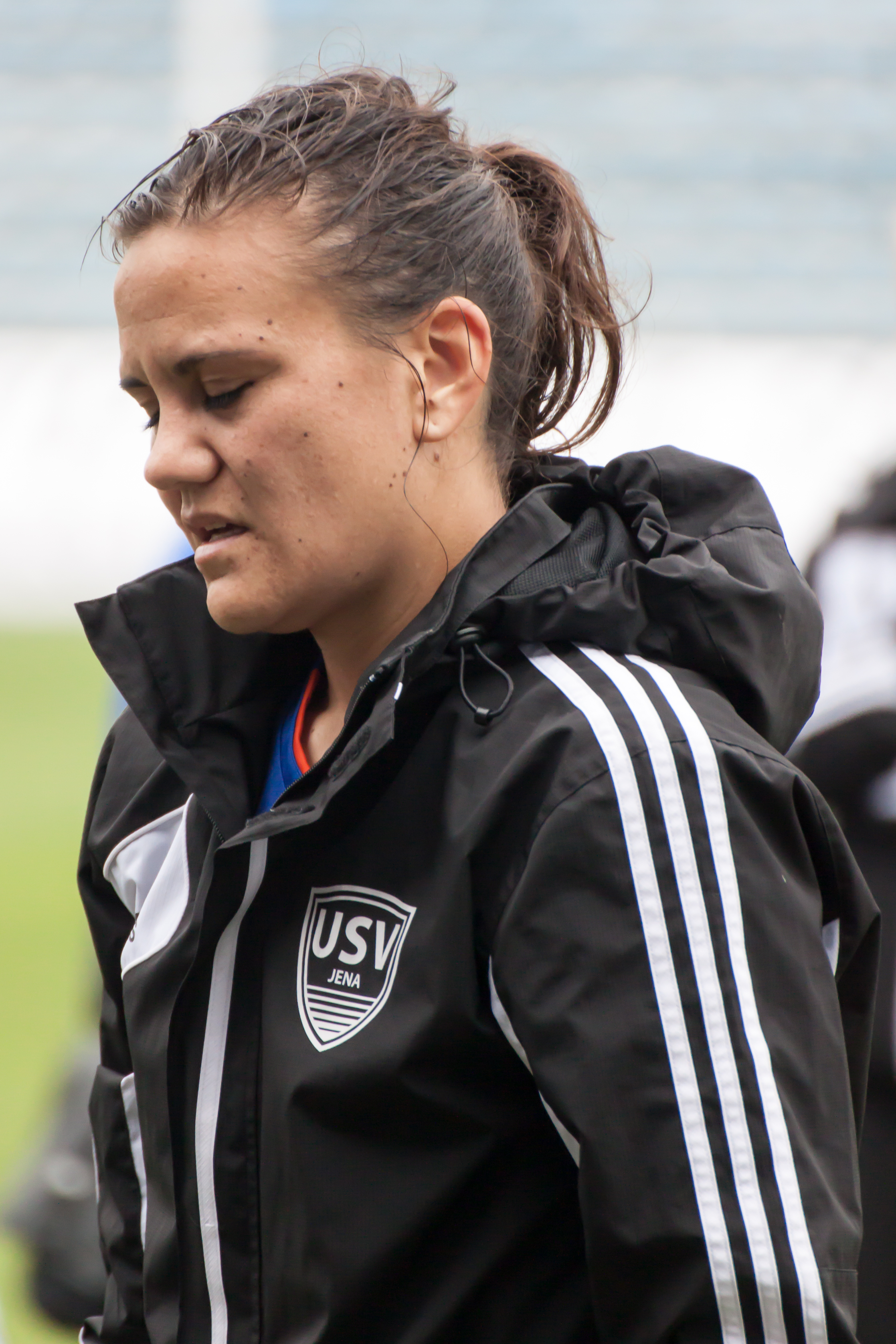
- Amber Hearn in 2014

Personal information
- Full name: Amber Liarnie Rose Hearn
- Date of birth: 28 November 1984 (age 41)
- Place of birth: Henderson, New Zealand
- Height: 1.73 m (5 ft 8 in)
- Position: Forward

Senior career*
Years	Team	Apps	(Gls)
2004–2005	Arsenal		
2005–2006	Doncaster Rovers Belles		
2009–2010	Ottawa Fury	12	(6)
2011	Lynn-Avon United		
2011–2017	FF USV Jena	109	(36)
2017–2018	1. FC Köln	22	(4)
2018–2019	Dux Logroño		

International career
2004–2018	New Zealand	125	(54)
- * Club domestic league appearances and goals

Amber Liarnie Rose Hearn (born 28 November 1984) is a New Zealand former professional soccer player who represented New Zealand between 2004 and 2018. A prolific scorer, she is the country's all-time top scorer and the highest scoring international for the Oceania Football Confederation.

== Personal life ==
Hearn is of Māori descent, and affiliates to the Ngāpuhi iwi.

== Club career ==
At club level she has played in England for Arsenal and Doncaster Rovers Belles. The 2009/10 season she played for the Ottawa Fury Women of the USL W-League. She then returned one year to New Zealand where she played for Lynn-Avon United. After that year she announced her transfer to German Bundesliga side FF USV Jena.

In 2003, she was named New Zealand's football player of the year. At the 2010 OFC Women's Championship she won the golden boot with 12 goals.

== International career ==
Hearn was included in the New Zealand squad for the 2008 Summer Olympics, starting in each of New Zealand's group games, scoring a penalty as one of New Zealand's goals in the 2–2 draw with Japan. Selected for the 2011 FIFA Women's World Cup in Germany, Hearn again scored against Japan, although they ultimately lost the match 2–1. She played the full 90 minutes in each of New Zealand's games, helping secure their first ever point at a Women's world cup in a 2–2 draw with Mexico.

Hearn holds the record for goals scored for the New Zealand women's team in internationals, scoring her 30th international goal against China in June 2012.

She featured in all New Zealand's three matches at the 2015 FIFA Women's World Cup in Canada.

In February 2020, Hearn retired officially from international football, after playing her last match for the national team in June 2018.

== Career statistics ==
=== International ===
Appearances and goals by national team, year and competition
Team	Year	Competitive		Friendly		Total	
Team	Year	Caps	Goals	Caps	Goals	Caps	Goals
New Zealand	2004	—		5	0	5	0
New Zealand	2005	—		1	0	1	0
New Zealand	2006	—		0	0	0	0
New Zealand	2007	0	0	0	0	0	0
New Zealand	2008	3 (Note: Appearances in Summer Olympics)	1	6	1	9	2
New Zealand	2009	—		8	3	8	3
New Zealand	2010	5 (Note: Appearances in OFC Women's Championship/OFC Women's Nations Cup)	12	8	4	13	16
New Zealand	2011	3 (Note: Appearances in FIFA Women's World Cup)	1	10	1	13	2
New Zealand	2012	5 (Note: One appearance and two goals in OFC Women's Olympic qualification, four appearances in Summer Olympics)	2	11	6	16	8
New Zealand	2013	—		11	4	11	4
New Zealand	2014	3	7	12	2	15	9
New Zealand	2015	3	0	10	2	13	2
New Zealand	2016	4 (Note: One appearance and two goals in OFC Women's Olympic qualification, three appearances and one goal in Summer Olympics)	3	8	3	12	6
New Zealand	2017	—		6	2	6	2
New Zealand	2018	0	0	3	0	3	0
Total		26	26	99	28	125	54

== Honours ==
Individual

- IFFHS All-time Women's Dream Team: Oceania
- IFFHS OFC Woman Team of the Decade: 2011–2020
