= Jinwen University of Science and Technology =

University in Xindian, New Taipei, Taiwan

- 景文科技大學
- Type: Private university
- Established: 1980 (as Jin-Wen College); 2007 (as JUST)
- Location: Xindian, New Taipei, Taiwan; 24.9520°N 121.5096°E
- Website: Official website (in Chinese)

Jinwen University of Science and Technology
- Traditional Chinese: 景文科技大學
Transcriptions
Standard Mandarin
- Hanyu Pinyin: Jǐngwén Kējì Dàxué
Southern Min
- Hokkien POJ: Kéng-bûn Kho-ki Tāi-ha̍k

Jinwen University of Science and Technology (JUST; Chinese: 景文科技大學; Pe̍h-ōe-jī: Kéng-bûn Kho-ki Tāi-ha̍k) is a private university in Xindian District, New Taipei, Taiwan.

The university offers undergraduate and graduate programs in various fields, including business, engineering, design, and humanities.

JWUST has six colleges, namely College of Business, College of Engineering, College of Design, College of Humanities, College of Tourism and Hospitality, and College of Continuing Education. Each college offers various undergraduate and graduate programs.

== History ==
JUST was originally established as Jin-Wen College in 1980. In 1998, it was upgraded to Jin-Wen Institute of Technology. In 2007, the college's name was finally upgraded to Jinwen University of Science and Technology.

== Faculties ==
- College of Business Management
- College of Electrical, Information and Resources Engineering
- College of Hospitality and Tourism Management
- College of Humanities and Design

== Notable alumni ==
- Chen Bolin, actor
- Jay Shih, actor, singer and television host
- Chan Tzu-hsuan, actress

== See also ==
- List of universities in Taiwan
- Jinwen University of Science and Technology light rail station
