= 1975 AFC Women's Championship =

Tournament details
- Host country: Hong Kong
- Dates: 25 August – 3 September
- Teams: 6 (from 2 confederations)
- Venue: 1 (in 1 host city)

Final positions
- Champions: New Zealand (1st title)
- Runners-up: Thailand
- Third place: Australia
- Fourth place: Malaysia

Tournament statistics
- Matches played: 10
- Goals scored: 35 (3.5 per match)

The 1975 AFC Women's Championship, officially known as the Asian Cup Ladies Football Tournament was the first edition of the AFC Women's Championship. It was held from 25 August to 3 September 1975 in Hong Kong. Participating members were New Zealand, Thailand, Australia, (Note: An Australian representative side (largely from the St. George club and the New South Wales state team) participated and had been labelled as "Australia" by the organisers. These games were not recognised as official Australian A-internationals, but the players achievements were recognised as such in 2023.) Hong Kong, Singapore, Malaysia. The tournament was won by New Zealand in the final against Thailand.

== Venue ==
All matches were held at the Government Stadium in Hong Kong.

Hong Kong	Hong Kong
Hong Kong is located in Hong Kong
Hong Kong is located in Hong Kong	Government Stadium
Hong Kong is located in Hong Kong	Capacity: 40,000

== Entrants ==
ALFC members	Invitees	Did not enter (ALFC members)
Hong Kong (Host)*; Malaysia; Singapore; Thailand	Australia; New Zealand	Republic of China; Indonesia

== Group stage ==
=== Group A ===
Team	Pld	W	D	L	GF	GA	GD	Pts
Thailand	2	2	0	0	6	2	+4	4
Australia	2	1	0	1	5	3	+2	2
Singapore	2	0	0	2	0	6	−6	0

Source: RSSSF
25 August 1975

Thailand	3–2	Australia
Boabutr 20'; Chaisawat 29'; Thongsa 52'		O'Connor 58'; Abenthum 60' (pen.)

Government Stadium, Hong Kong
Attendance: 4,119

27 August 1975

Thailand	3–0	Singapore
Thongsa 19'; Monchanuan 22', 46'

Government Stadium, Hong Kong
Attendance: 4,500

29 August 1975

Australia	3–0	Singapore
Tagg 19'; Dolan 52'; O'Connor 60'

Government Stadium, Hong Kong
Attendance: 2,226

=== Group B ===
Team	Pld	W	D	L	GF	GA	GD	Pts
New Zealand	2	2	0	0	5	0	+5	4
Malaysia	2	1	0	1	2	3	−1	2
Hong Kong	2	0	0	2	0	4	−4	0

Source: RSSSF
25 August 1975

Hong Kong	0–2	New Zealand
		Marshall 8'; Lee 60'

Government Stadium, Hong Kong
Attendance: 4,119

27 August 1975

New Zealand	3–0	Malaysia
Simeonoff 14'; Marshall 33', 43'

Government Stadium, Hong Kong
Attendance: 4,500

29 August 1975

Hong Kong	0–2	Malaysia
		Ashikin 45'; Noor 58'

Government Stadium, Hong Kong
Attendance: 2,226

== Knock-out stage ==
Semi-finals
31 August – Hong Kong
New Zealand	3
Australia	2
31 August – Hong Kong
Thailand	3
Malaysia	0

Final
2 September – Hong Kong
New Zealand	3
Thailand	1
Third place
2 September – Hong Kong
Australia	5
Malaysia	0

=== Semi-finals ===
31 August 1975

New Zealand	3–2	Australia
Marshall 17'; Richardson 26', 50'		Tagg 48'; Dolan 59'

Government Stadium, Hong Kong
Attendance: 6,655

31 August 1975

Thailand	3–0	Malaysia
Monchanuan 4', 35'; Chaudet 36'

Government Stadium, Hong Kong
Attendance: 6,655

=== Third place play-off ===
2 September 1975

Australia	5–0	Malaysia

Government Stadium, Hong Kong
Attendance: 11,573

=== Final ===
2 September 1975

New Zealand	3–1	Thailand
Marshall 4', 29'; Hetherington 50' (pen.)		Thongsa 41'

Government Stadium, Hong Kong
Attendance: 11,573
Referee: S. Kathiravale (Malaysia)

== Winner ==
AFC Women's Championship
1975 winners

New Zealand
First title
