= New Zealand women's national football team =

Women's national association football team representing New Zealand

New Zealand
- Nickname: Football Ferns
- Association: New Zealand Football
- Confederation: OFC (Oceania)
- Head coach: Michael Mayne
- Captain: Ali Riley
- Most caps: Ria Percival (166)
- Top scorer: Amber Hearn (54)
- FIFA code: NZL
First colours	Second colours

FIFA ranking
- Current: 33 ▼1 (20 October 2026)
- Highest: 16 (December 2013, July 2015 – March 2016)
- Lowest: 35 (December 2025)

First international
- New Zealand 2–0 Hong Kong (Hong Kong; 25 August 1975)

Biggest win
- New Zealand 21–0 Samoa (Auckland, New Zealand; 9 October 1998)

Biggest defeat
- North Korea 11–0 New Zealand (Brisbane, Australia; 24 February 2004)

World Cup
- Appearances: 6 (first in 1991)
- Best result: Group stage (1991, 2007, 2011, 2015, 2019, 2023)

Olympic Games
- Appearances: 5 (first in 2008)
- Best result: Quarter-finals (2012)

OFC Nations Cup
- Appearances: 11 (first in 1983)
- Best result: Champions (1983, 1991, 2007, 2010, 2014, 2018)
Medal record
OFC Women's Nations Cup
Gold medal – first place	1983 New Caledonia
Gold medal – first place	1991 Australia
Gold medal – first place	2007 Papua New Guinea
Gold medal – first place	2010 New Zealand
Gold medal – first place	2014 Papua New Guinea	Team
Gold medal – first place	2018 New Caledonia	Team
Silver medal – second place	1989 Australia
Silver medal – second place	1994 Papua New Guinea
Silver medal – second place	1998 New Zealand
Silver medal – second place	2003 Australia
AFC Women's Championship
Gold medal – first place	1975 Hong Kong
CONCACAF W Championship
Silver medal – second place	1993 United States

The New Zealand women's national football team represents New Zealand in international football competitions, and is governed by New Zealand Football (NZF). They are nicknamed the Football Ferns.

The New Zealand national team has taken part in the FIFA Women's World Cup six times, making their debut in 1991. New Zealand co-hosted the 2023 World Cup alongside Australia. They have failed to go past the group stage in all occasions.

== History ==
The New Zealand Women's Soccer Association was founded in 1975. By invitation, the team took part in the Asian Women's Championship in 1975 and won the championship. They have since then played in the Oceanic Championship.

As Australia left the OFC, New Zealand had no serious and competitive rivals in Oceania. This made New Zealand's qualification to the World Cup and Olympics easier having contested every edition of both tournaments since 2007.

=== 2023 FIFA Women's World Cup ===
New Zealand co-hosted the 2023 FIFA Women's World Cup along with Australia after being awarded it on 25 June 2020 as the favourites over other bidder Colombia. The Football Ferns automatically qualified as co-hosts. Despite winning their opening match against Norway, their first World Cup win for either a women's or men's World Cup, they suffered a shocking loss to debutants Philippines and later drew with Switzerland in their final match and were eliminated after Norway defeated the Philippines and finished above New Zealand on goal difference. This was the first time the hosts were eliminated from the group stage. They only managed to score one goal during the tournament.

== Team image ==
The New Zealand women's national football team are also known by their nickname the "Football Ferns". Like their male counterparts, the team has traditionally worn all white kits. For the 2023 FIFA Women's World Cup, the Football Ferns switched to an all black first choice kit reminiscent of the New Zealand national rugby union team, as well as the country's national teams in other sports, including rugby league, field hockey, netball, basketball, volleyball, and limited overs cricket. The away kit pairs the traditional white shirts and socks with turquoise shorts.

== FIFA world rankings ==
As of 14 July 2021

Worst Ranking Best Ranking Worst Mover Best Mover

New Zealand's FIFA world rankings
Rank	Year	Games Played	Won	Lost	Drawn	Best		Worst	
Rank	Year	Games Played	Won	Lost	Drawn	Rank	Move	Rank	Move
22	2021	1	0	1	0	22	▲0	22	▼0

== Results and fixtures ==
The following is a list of match results in the last 12 months, as well as any future matches that have been scheduled.

Legend

Win Draw Loss Fixture Void or Postponed

=== 2025 ===
23 October Friendly	Mexico	1–0	New Zealand	Mexico City, Mexico
20:00 UTC−6	Farmer 10'	Report		Stadium: Estadio Ciudad de los Deportes; Attendance: 10,250; Referee: Astrid Gramajo (Guatemala)

26 October Friendly	Mexico	2–0	New Zealand	Ciudad Juárez, Mexico
20:00 UTC−6	Ordóñez 11'; Sánchez 16'	Report		Stadium: Estadio Olímpico Benito Juárez; Attendance: 2,000; Referee: Belkis Flores (Honduras)

29 October Friendly	United States	6–0	New Zealand	Kansas City, United States
19:00 UTC−5	Sears 8', 55', 84'; Cooper 34'; Lavelle 44'; Macario 66'	Report		Stadium: CPKC Stadium; Attendance: 11,044; Referee: Saphire Stockman (Costa Rica)

28 November Friendly	Australia	5–0	New Zealand	Gosford, Australia
19:30 UTC+11	Sayer 13'; Raso 24'; Carpenter 70'; Cooney-Cross 71'; Gorry 90+2'	Report		Stadium: polytec Stadium; Attendance: 20,519; Referee: Kim Yu-jeong (South Korea)

2 December Friendly	Australia	2–0	New Zealand	Adelaide, Australia
20:00 UTC+10:30	Kennedy 19'; Raso 70'	Report		Stadium: Coopers Stadium; Attendance: 15,097; Referee: Hong Yu (China)

=== 2026 ===
27 February 2027 FIFA Women's World Cup qualification	New Zealand	8–0	Samoa	Honiara, Solomon Islands
13:00 UTC+11	Brown 1', 13', 39'; Kitching 65'; Aisei 82' (o.g.); Elliott 83', 89'; Jackson 90+7'	Report (FIFA)		Stadium: National Stadium; Attendance: 200; Referee: Mu Mingxin (China)

2 March 2027 FIFA Women's World Cup qualification	New Zealand	8–0	Solomon Islands	Honiara, Solomon Islands
17:00 UTC+11	Clegg 2', 81'; Riley 8'; Blake 16', 65', 73'; Jale 61'; Vlok 75'	Report (FIFA)		Stadium: National Stadium; Attendance: 400; Referee: Gulshoda Saitkulova (Uzbekistan)

5 March 2027 FIFA Women's World Cup qualification	American Samoa	0–3	New Zealand	Honiara, Solomon Islands
13:00 UTC+11		Report (FIFA)	Brown 41' (pen.); Bunge 51'; Riley 71'	Stadium: National Stadium; Attendance: 200; Referee: Mu Mingxin (China)

11 April 2027 FIFA Women's World Cup qualification	New Zealand	5–0	Fiji	Hamilton, New Zealand
16:10 UTC+12	Brown 11'; Taylor 21'; Foster 27'; Kitching 38'; Blake 74'	Report (FIFA)		Stadium: FMG Stadium Waikato; Attendance: 3,267; Referee: Shama Maemae (Solomon Islands)

15 April 2027 FIFA Women's World Cup qualification	Papua New Guinea	0–1	New Zealand	Auckland, New Zealand
19:10 UTC+12		Report (FIFA); Report (OFC)	Kitching 55'	Stadium: North Harbour Stadium; Attendance: 3,984; Referee: Torika Delai (Fiji)

5 June Friendly	New Zealand	1–2	Haiti	Málaga, Spain
18:00 UTC+2	Bunge 41'	Report	Mondesir 45+3'; Étienne 47'	Stadium: Nuevo Estadio El Maulí

9 June Friendly	New Zealand	0–0	Morocco	Málaga, Spain
18:00 UTC+2		Report		Stadium: Nuevo Estadio El Maulí

10 October Friendly	Panama	Cancelled	New Zealand	Panama City, Panama
19:00 UTC−5		Report		Stadium: Estadio Rommel Fernández
Note: Two-match series between Panama cancelled due to the 2026 Panama earthquake.

13 October Friendly	Panama	Cancelled	New Zealand	Panama City, Panama
16:30 UTC−5		Report		Stadium: Estadio Rommel Fernández
Note: Two-match series between Panama cancelled due to the 2026 Panama earthquake.

29 November Friendly	New Zealand	v	Philippines	Porirua, New Zealand
		Report		Stadium: Porirua Park

4 December Friendly	New Zealand	v	Philippines	Porirua, New Zealand
		Report		Stadium: Porirua Park

- New Zealand Fixtures and Results – Soccerway.com

== Coaching staff ==
=== Current coaching staff ===
Position	Name
Head coach	(New Zealand) Michael Mayne
Assistant coach	(England) Jenni Foster
Assistant coach	(New Zealand) Sam Wilkinson
Goalkeeping coach	(Gibraltar) Will Britt
Sports Scientist	(New Zealand) Reilly O'Meagher

=== Manager history ===
- (New Zealand) Dave Farrington (1975–1979)
- (New Zealand) Ken Armstrong (1980)
- (England) Dave Boardman (1981–1982)
- (England) Roy Cox (1983–1987)
- (England) Dave Boardman (1988–1994)
- (England) Jeff Coulshed (1994)
- (New Zealand) Nora Watkins (1995)
- (New Zealand) Maurice Tillotson (1995–1998)
- (England) Douglas Moore (1999–2000)
- (New Zealand) Sandy Davie (2001–2003)
- (New Zealand) Fred Simpson (2004)
- (New Zealand) Alison Grant & (New Zealand) Wendi Henderson (2004)
- (England) Mick Leonard (2005)
- (England) John Herdman (2006)
- (England) Allan Jones (2006–2007)
- (England) John Herdman (2007–2011)
- (England) Tony Readings (2011–2017)
- (Austria) Andreas Heraf (2017–2018)
- (Scotland) Tom Sermanni (2018–2021)
- (Czech Republic) Jitka Klimková (2021–2024)
- (New Zealand) Michael Mayne (2024–)

== Players ==
=== Current squad ===
The following players were called up for the friendly matches against the Philippines, on 29 November and 4 December 2026.

Caps and goals correct as of 9 June 2026, after the match against Morocco.

No.	Pos.	Player	Date of birth (age)	Caps	Goals	Club
1	GK	Victoria Esson	6 March 1991 (age 35)	34	0	(New Zealand Football) Wellington Phoenix
23	GK	Alina Santos	25 August 2003 (age 23)	4	0	(The Football Association) Southampton
—	GK	Brooke Neary	14 October 2007 (age 19)	0	0	(New Zealand Football) Wellington Phoenix
2	DF	Kate Taylor	21 October 2003 (age 23)	34	3	(Royal Spanish Football Federation) Madrid CFF
3	DF	Claudia Bunge	21 September 1999 (age 27)	44	2	(Football Australia) Melbourne Victory
13	DF	Rebekah Stott	17 June 1993 (age 33)	114	4	(Football Australia) Melbourne City
19	DF	Liz Anton	12 December 1998 (age 27)	30	0	(Football Australia) Canberra United
25	DF	Mackenzie Barry	11 April 2001 (age 25)	25	1	(New Zealand Football) Wellington Phoenix
—	DF	Grace Neville	9 April 2000 (age 26)	14	0	(The Football Association) Watford
—	DF	Manaia Elliott	21 April 2005 (age 21)	11	2	(New Zealand Football) Wellington Phoenix
—	DF	Rebecca Lake	13 May 1999 (age 27)	0	0	(Football Australia) Central Coast Mariners
6	MF	Malia Steinmetz	18 January 1999 (age 27)	35	0	(Danish Football Association) FC Nordsjælland
10	MF	Katie Kitching	30 November 1998 (age 27)	30	9	(The Football Association) Sunderland
12	MF	Maya Hahn	7 February 2001 (age 25)	14	1	(German Football Association) Viktoria Berlin
—	MF	Helena Errington	31 July 2005 (age 21)	0	0	(Football Association of Iceland) FH Hafnarfjörður
—	MF	Charlotte Lancaster	8 November 2003 (age 23)	4	0	(Football Australia) Central Coast Mariners
—	MF	Deven Jackson	22 April 1998 (age 28)	11	1	(Football Australia) Melbourne City
9	FW	Milly Clegg	1 November 2005 (age 21)	25	4	(New Zealand Football) Wellington Phoenix
16	FW	Jacqui Hand	19 February 1999 (age 27)	41	9	(Swiss Football Association) FC Basel
17	FW	Gabi Rennie	7 July 2001 (age 25)	49	2	(Swedish Football Association) Eskilstuna United
18	FW	Grace Jale	10 April 1999 (age 27)	41	9	(New Zealand Football) Wellington Phoenix
22	FW	Hannah Blake	5 May 2000 (age 26)	13	4	(Scottish Football Association) Rangers
27	FW	Maggie Jenkins	14 June 2001 (age 25)	3	0	(Football Australia) Perth Glory
—	FW	Indiah-Paige Riley	20 December 2001 (age 24)	37	9	(New Zealand Football) Wellington Phoenix

=== Recent call-ups ===
The following players have also been called up to the squad within the past 12 months.

Pos.	Player	Date of birth (age)	Caps	Goals	Club	Latest call-up
GK	Maddie Iro	24 October 2005 (age 21)	1	0	(Australia) Hills United	v. Panama, 13 October 2026 ^{CAN}
GK	Anna Leat	26 June 2001 (age 25)	22	0	(Australia) Newcastle Jets	v. Australia, 2 December 2025
DF	Ally Green	17 August 1998 (age 28)	22	2	(Denmark) FC Copenhagen	v. Panama, 13 October 2026 ^{CAN}
DF	Meikayla Moore	4 June 1996 (age 30)	77	4	(Canada) Calgary Wild	v. Panama, 13 October 2026 ^{CAN}
DF	Michaela Foster	9 January 1999 (age 27)	37	2	(England) Durham	v. Morocco, 9 June 2026
DF	Suya Haering	3 July 2005 (age 21)	2	0	(Germany) FC Carl Zeiss Jena	v. American Samoa, 5 March 2026
DF	Lara Wall ^{INJ}	31 May 2000 (age 26)	2	0	(New Zealand) Wellington Phoenix	v. Samoa, 27 February 2026
DF	CJ Bott	22 April 1995 (age 31)	50	3	(New Zealand) Wellington Phoenix	v. Australia, 2 December 2025
MF	Daisy Brazendale	12 March 2006 (age 20)	0	0	Unattached	v. Panama, 13 October 2026 ^{CAN}
MF	Emma Pijnenburg	13 September 2004 (age 22)	10	0	(Netherlands) Hera United	v. Panama, 13 October 2026 ^{CAN}
MF	Grace Wisnewski	28 June 2002 (age 24)	8	0	(Denmark) FC Nordsjælland	v. Panama, 13 October 2026 ^{CAN}
MF	Mae Hunt	29 November 2005 (age 20)	0	0	(United States) University of Buffalo	v. Morocco, 9 June 2026
MF	Betsy Hassett ^{RET}	4 August 1990 (age 36)	160	16	(Iceland) Stjarnan	v. Australia, 2 December 2025
MF	Annalie Longo ^{RET}	1 July 1991 (age 35)	142	15	(New Zealand) Auckland United	v. Australia, 2 December 2025
MF	Olivia Chance	5 October 1993 (age 33)	47	2	(Norway) Kolbotn	v. Australia, 2 December 2025
FW	Kelli Brown	21 February 2001 (age 25)	13	5	(Australia) Newcastle Jets	v. Papua New Guinea, 15 April 2026
FW	Pia Vlok	4 September 2008 (age 18)	4	1	(New Zealand) Wellington Phoenix	v. Papua New Guinea, 15 April 2026
Notes: ^{ALT} = Alternate; ^{CAN} = Matches cancelled; ^{INJ} = Withdrew due to injury; ^{PRE} = Preliminary squad / standby; ^{RET} = Retired from the national team

=== Captains ===
- Ali Riley – 50 matches (2017–2025)
- Abby Erceg – 49 matches (2013–2017)
- Rebecca Smith – 45 matches (2003–2007, 2011–2012)
- Hayley Moorwood – 43 matches (2007–2011)
- Barbara Cox – 19 matches (1975,1984–1987)
- Terry McCahill – 14 matches (1995–1998)
- Marilyn Marshall – 12 matches (?)
- Wendi Henderson – 9 matches (2000, 2006–2007)
- Maureen Jacobson – 9 matches (2005–2006)
- Ali Grant – 6 matches (1981–1983)
- Ria Percival – 6 matches (2017, 2019, 2023)
- Leslie King – 5 matches (1991)
- Viv Robertson – 5 matches (1998–1991)
- Rebekah Stott – 7 matches

== Records ==
As of 9 June 2026

Players in bold are still active with the national team.

=== Most Appearances ===
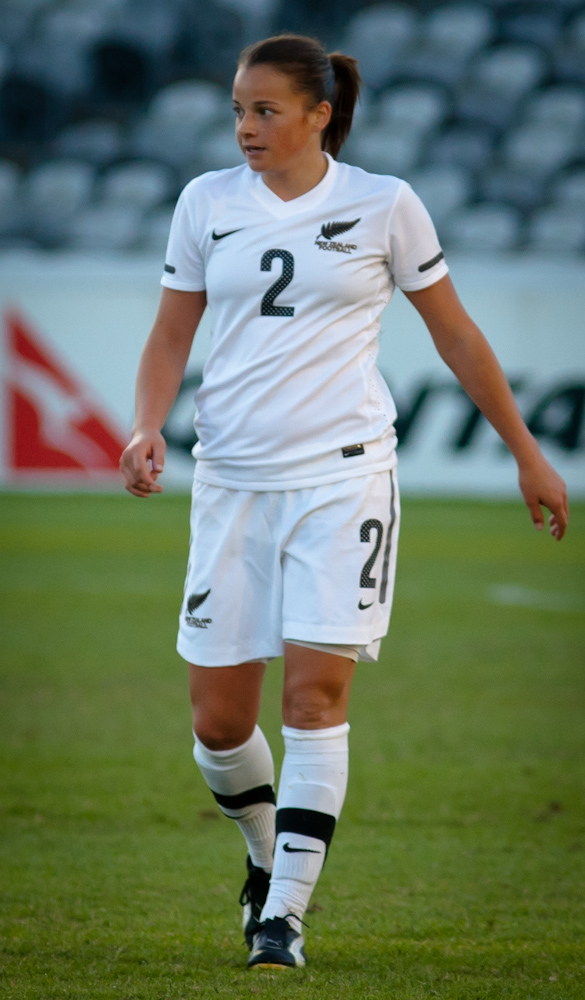
Ria Percival is the most capped player

Rank	Player	Career	Caps	Goals
1	Ria Percival	2006–2023	166	15
2	Ali Riley	2007–2024	163	2
3	Betsy Hassett	2008–2025	160	16
4	Abby Erceg	2006–2022	146	6
5	Annalie Longo	2006–2025	144	15
6	Amber Hearn	2004–2018	125	54
6	Hannah Wilkinson	2010–2024	125	32
8	Katie Duncan	2006–2019	124	1
9	**Katie Bowen**	2011–present	116	4
10	**Rebekah Stott**	2012–present	114	4

=== Top goalscorers ===
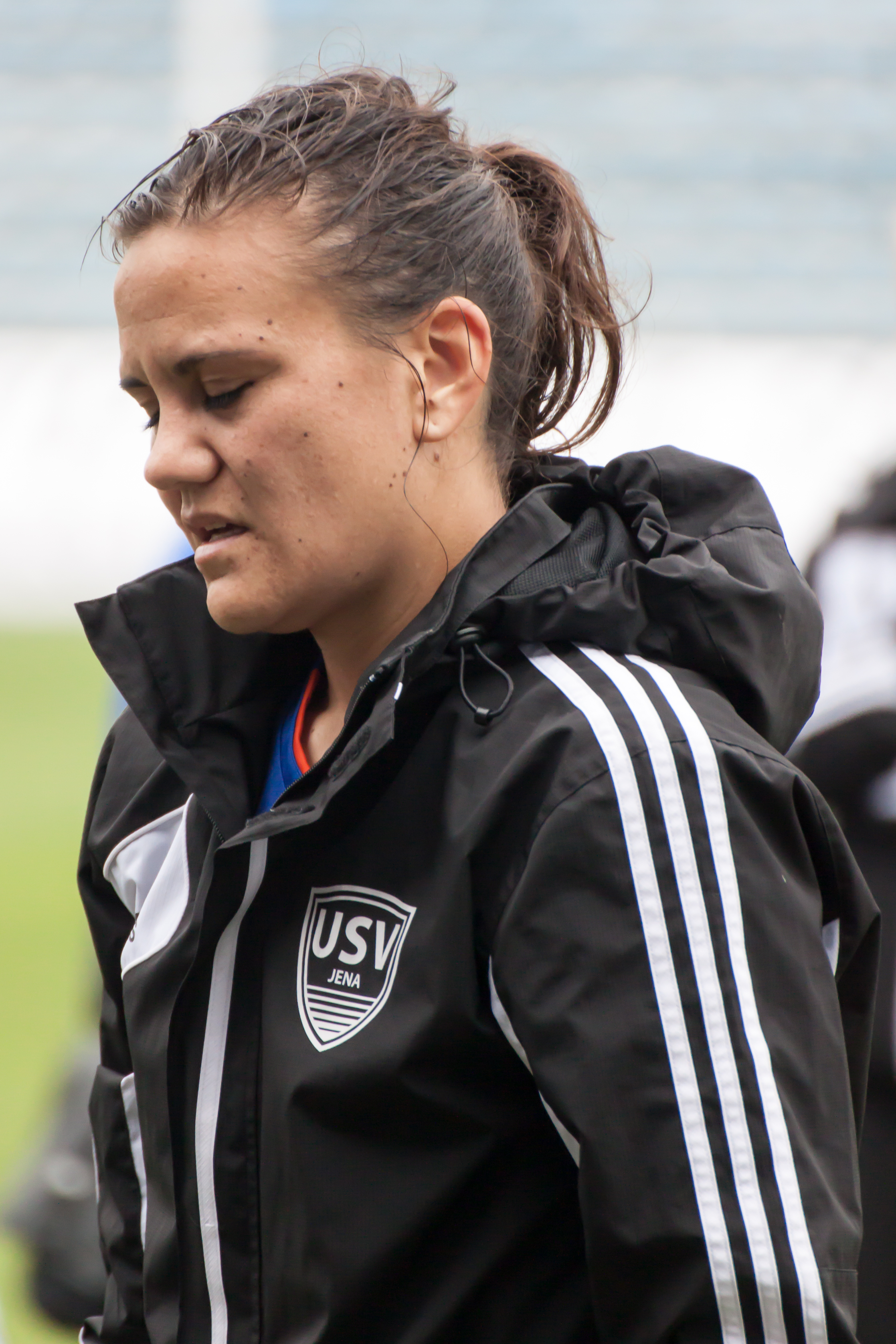
Amber Hearn is the all-time top scorer

Rank	Player	Career	Goals	Caps	Avg.
1	Amber Hearn (list)	2004–2018	54	125	0.43
2	Wendy Sharpe	1980–1995	34	47	0.72
2	Sarah Gregorius	2010–2020	34	100	0.34
4	Hannah Wilkinson	2010–2024	32	125	0.26
5	Rosie White	2009–2021	24	111	0.22
6	Maureen Jacobson	1979–1996	17	53	0.32
6	Wendi Henderson	1987–2007	17	64	0.27
8	Betsy Hassett	2008–2025	16	160	0.10
9	Pernille Andersen	1998–1998	15	7	2.14
9	Annalie Longo	2006–2025	15	144	0.10
9	Ria Percival	2006–2023	15	166	0.09

== Honours ==
=== Major competitions ===
- OFC Women's Nations Cup

Champions (6): 1983, 1991, 2007, 2010, 2014, 2018
Runners-up (4): 1989, 1994, 1998, 2003

- AFC Women's Championship

Champions: 1975

- CONCACAF W Championship

Runners-up (1): 1993

== Competitive record ==
=== FIFA Women's World Cup ===
New Zealand's FIFA Women's World Cup record										Qualification record						
Year	Round	Pos	Pld	W	D*	L	GF	GA	Squad	Outcome	Pld	W	D	L	GF	GA
(China) 1991	Group stage	11th	3	0	0	3	1	11	Squad	Via OFC Women's Nations Cup						
(Sweden) 1995	Did not qualify									Via OFC Women's Nations Cup						
(United States) 1999	Did not qualify									Via OFC Women's Nations Cup						
(United States) 2003	Did not qualify									Via OFC Women's Nations Cup						
(China) 2007	Group stage	14th	3	0	0	3	0	9	Squad	Via OFC Women's Nations Cup						
(Germany) 2011	Group stage	12th	3	0	1	2	4	6	Squad	Via OFC Women's Nations Cup						
(Canada) 2015	Group stage	19th	3	0	2	1	2	3	Squad	Via OFC Women's Nations Cup						
(France) 2019	Group stage	20th	3	0	0	3	1	5	Squad	Via OFC Women's Nations Cup						
(Australia) (New Zealand) 2023	Group stage	20th	3	1	1	1	1	1	Squad	Qualified as co-hosts						
(Brazil) 2027	Qualified									1st	5	5	0	0	25	0
(Costa Rica) (Jamaica) (Mexico) (United States) 2031	To be determined									To be determined						
(United Kingdom) 2035	To be determined									To be determined						
Total	Group stage	7/10	18	1	4	13	9	35			37	33	0	4	277	9

FIFA Women's World Cup history
Year	Host	Round	Date	Opponent	Result	Stadium
1991	China	Group stage	17 November	Denmark	L 0–3	Tianhe Stadium, Guangzhou
1991	China	Group stage	19 November	Norway	L 0–4	Guangdong Provincial Stadium, Guangzhou
1991	China	Group stage	21 November	China	L 1–4	New Plaza Stadium, Foshan
2007	China	Group stage	12 September	Brazil	L 0–5	Wuhan Stadium, Wuhan
2007	China	Group stage	15 September	Denmark	L 0–2	Wuhan Stadium, Wuhan
2007	China	Group stage	20 September	China	L 0–2	Tianjin Olympic Centre Stadium, Tianjin
2011	Germany	Group stage	27 June	Japan	L 1–2	Ruhrstadion, Bochum
2011	Germany	Group stage	1 July	England	L 1–2	Rudolf-Harbig-Stadion, Dresden
2011	Germany	Group stage	5 July	Mexico	D 2–2	Rhein-Neckar-Arena, Sinsheim
2015	Canada	Group stage	6 June	Netherlands	L 0–1	Commonwealth Stadium, Edmonton
2015	Canada	Group stage	11 June	Canada	D 0–0	Commonwealth Stadium, Edmonton
2015	Canada	Group stage	15 June	China	D 2–2	Winnipeg Stadium, Winnipeg
2019	France	Group stage	11 June	Netherlands	L 0–1	Stade Océane, Le Havre
2019	France	Group stage	15 June	Canada	L 0–2	Stade des Alpes, Grenoble
2019	France	Group stage	20 June	Cameroon	L 1–2	Stade de la Mosson, Montpellier
2023	Australia; New Zealand	Group stage	20 July	Norway	W 1–0	Eden Park, Auckland
2023	Australia; New Zealand	Group stage	25 July	Philippines	L 0–1	Wellington Regional Stadium, Wellington
2023	Australia; New Zealand	Group stage	30 July	Switzerland	D 0–0	Forsyth Barr Stadium, Dunedin

=== Olympic Games ===
Summer Olympics record
Year	Host	Round	Pos	Pld	W	D	L	GF	GA	GD	Squad
1996	United States	Did not qualify									
2000	Australia	Did not qualify									
2004	Greece	Did not enter									
2008	China	Group stage	10th	3	0	1	2	2	7	−5	Squad
2012	United Kingdom	Quarter-finals	8th	4	1	0	3	3	5	−2	Squad
2016	Brazil	Group stage	9th	3	1	0	2	1	5	−4	Squad
2020	Japan	Group stage	12th	3	0	0	3	2	10	−8	Squad
2024	France	Group stage	10th	3	0	0	3	2	6	−4	Squad
Total		Quarter-finals	5/8	16	2	1	13	10	33	−23	

=== OFC Women's Nations Cup ===
OFC Women's Nations Cup record
Year	Round	Position	Pld	W	D	L	GF	GA
(New Caledonia) 1983	Champions	1st	4	3	1	0	24	3
(New Zealand) 1986	Third place	3rd	4	2	0	2	3	3
(Australia) 1989	Runners-up	2nd	5	4	0	1	10	1
(Australia) 1991	Champions	1st	4	3	0	1	28	1
(Papua New Guinea) 1994	Runners-up	2nd	4	3	0	1	10	2
(New Zealand) 1998	Runners-up	2nd	4	3	0	1	41	3
(Australia) 2003	Runners-up	2nd	4	3	0	1	29	2
(Papua New Guinea) 2007	Champions	1st	3	3	0	0	21	1
(New Zealand) 2010	Champions	1st	5	5	0	0	50	0
(Papua New Guinea) 2014	Champions	1st	3	3	0	0	30	0
(New Caledonia) 2018	Champions	1st	5	5	0	0	43	0
(Fiji) 2022	Did not enter							
(Fiji) 2025	Did not enter							
Total	6 titles	11/13	45	37	1	7	289	16

=== AFC Women's Asian Cup ===
AFC Women's Asian Cup record
Year	Result	Position	Pld	W	D	L	GF	GA
Invitee
(British Hong Kong) 1975	Champions	1st	4	4	0	0	11	3
Total	1 title	1/1	4	4	0	0	11	3

=== Algarve Cup ===
The Algarve Cup is an invitational tournament for national teams in women's association football hosted by the Portuguese Football Federation (FPF). Held annually in the Algarve region of Portugal since 1994, it is one of the most prestigious and longest-running women's international football events and has been nicknamed the "Mini FIFA Women's World Cup".

(Portugal) Algarve Cup record
Year	Result	Matches	Wins	Draws	Losses	GF	GA	GD
2016	4th place	4	1	2	1	2	2	0
2020	4th place	3	0	1	2	2	6	−4
Total	2/28	7	1	3	3	4	8	−4

=== SheBelieves Cup ===
The SheBelieves Cup is a global invitational tournament for national teams in women's soccer hosted in the United States.

(United States) SheBelieves Cup record
Year	Result	Matches	Wins	Draws	Losses	GF	GA	GD
2022	4th	3	0	1	2	0	6	−6
Total	1/10	3	0	1	2	0	6	−6

== See also ==
- Sport in New Zealand
  - Football in New Zealand
    - Women's football in New Zealand
- New Zealand women's national football team
  - New Zealand women's national football team results
  - List of New Zealand women's international footballers
- New Zealand women's national under-20 football team
- New Zealand women's national under-17 football team

Sporting positions
Preceded by Inaugural Champions	OFC Women's Champions; 1983 (first title)	Succeeded by 1986 Chinese Taipei
Preceded by 1989 Chinese Taipei	OFC Women's Champions; 1991 (second title)	Succeeded by 1995 Australia
Preceded by 2003 Australia	OFC Women's Champions; 2007 (third title); 2010 (fourth title); 2014 (fifth title); 2018 (sixth title)	Succeeded by Incumbents
Preceded by Inaugural Champions	AFC Women's Champions; 1975 (first title)	Succeeded by 1977 Taiwan
