= Orfanidis =

Orfanidis is a surname. Notable people with the surname include:

- Lazaros Orfanidis (born 1995), Greek footballer
- Marios Orfanidis (born 1940), Cypriot footballer
- Petros Orfanidis (born 1996), Greek footballer

== See also ==
- Georgios Orphanidis (1859–1942), Greek sports shooter
- Orphanides, surname
