= List of international goals scored by Eugénie Le Sommer =

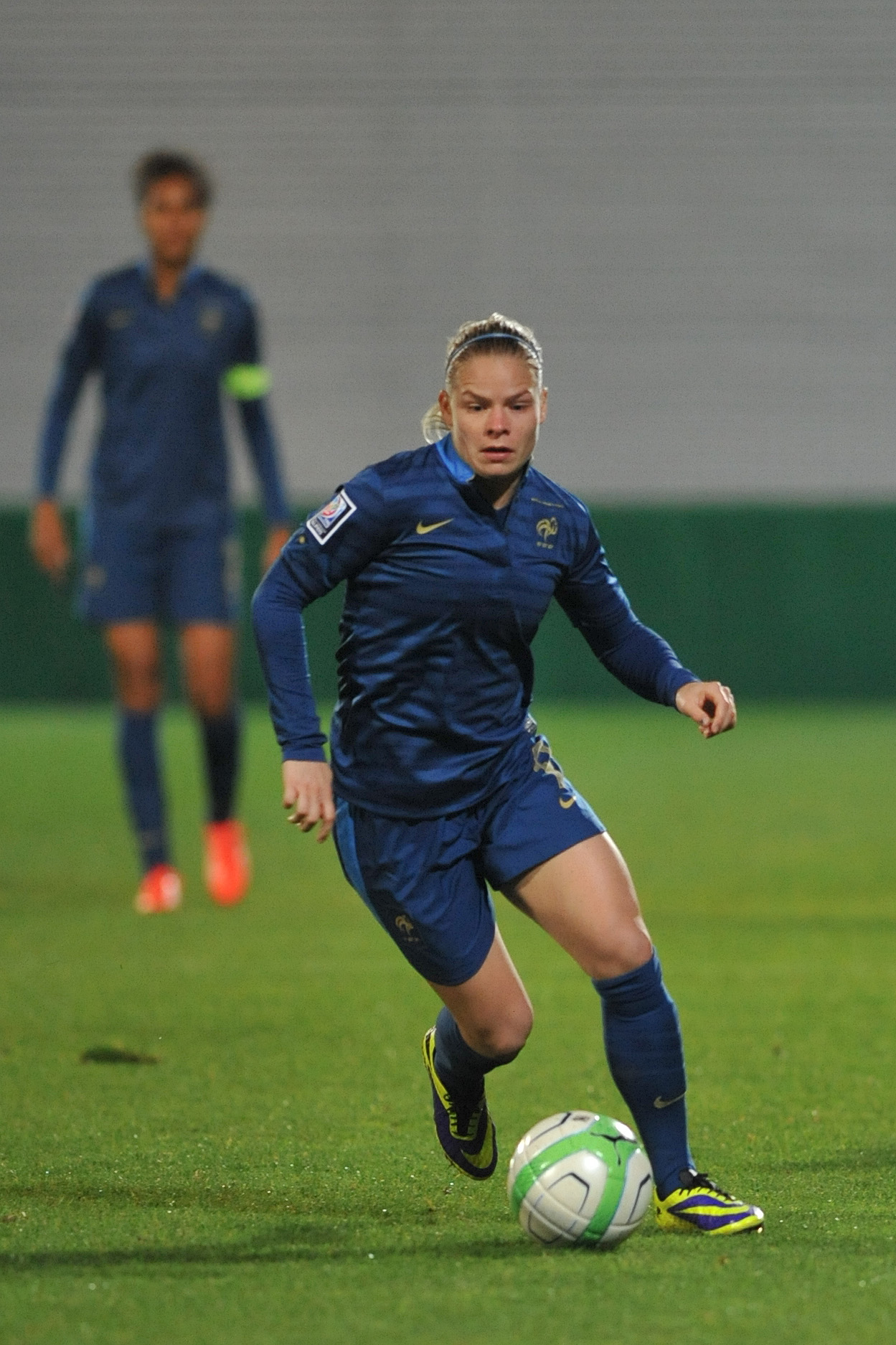
Le Sommer playing for France in 2013

Eugénie Le Sommer is a French professional footballer who has represented the France women's national football team as a forward since her debut in 2009. With 94 goals, she is the all-time top scorer of her country.

Le Sommer made her international debut on 12 February 2009 in a 2–0 friendly win over Republic of Ireland. On 22 September 2020, she scored her 82nd international goal and surpassed Marinette Pichon to become the all-time top scorer of France.

== International goals ==
Scores and results list France's goal tally first, score column indicates score after each Le Sommer goal.

International goals by date, venue, opponent, score, result and competition
No.	Date	Venue	Opponent	Score	Result	Competition
1	5 March 2009	Ammochostos Stadium, Larnaca, Cyprus	Scotland	2–0	2–0	2009 Cyprus Women's Cup
2	10 March 2009	Makario Stadium, Nicosia, Cyprus	South Africa	1–0	3–2	2009 Cyprus Women's Cup
3	23 September 2009	Ivan Laljak-Ivić Stadium, Zaprešić, Croatia	Croatia	5–0	7–0	2011 FIFA Women's World Cup qualification
4	27 March 2010	Stade de la Libération, Boulogne-sur-Mer, France	Northern Ireland	3–0	6–0	2011 FIFA Women's World Cup qualification
5	31 March 2010	Windsor Park, Belfast, Northern Ireland	Northern Ireland	3–0	4–0	2011 FIFA Women's World Cup qualification
6	20 June 2010	Stade Léo Lagrange, Besançon, France	Croatia	2–0	3–0	2011 FIFA Women's World Cup qualification
7	23 June 2010	Kadriorg Stadium, Tallinn, Estonia	Estonia	4–0	6–0	2011 FIFA Women's World Cup qualification
8	19 November 2010	Stade Jean Bouin, Angers, France	Poland	1–0	5–0	Friendly
9	7 March 2011	GSP Stadium, Nicosia, Cyprus	New Zealand	3–1	5–2	2011 Cyprus Women's Cup
10	14 September 2011	Ness Ziona Stadium, Ness Ziona, Israel	Israel	4–0	5–0	UEFA Women's Euro 2013 qualification
11	22 September 2011	Turner's Cross, Cork, Ireland	Republic of Ireland	3–0	3–1	UEFA Women's Euro 2013 qualification
12	22 October 2011	Parc y Scarlets, Llanelli, Wales	Wales	2–1	4–1	UEFA Women's Euro 2013 qualification
13	16 November 2011	Stade René Serge Nabajoth, Pointe-à-Pitre, Guadeloupe	Uruguay	5–0	8–0	Friendly
14	16 November 2011	Stade René Serge Nabajoth, Pointe-à-Pitre, Guadeloupe	Uruguay	7–0	8–0	Friendly
15	16 November 2011	Stade René Serge Nabajoth, Pointe-à-Pitre, Guadeloupe	Uruguay	8–0	8–0	Friendly
16	15 February 2012	Stade des Costières, Nîmes, France	Netherlands	1–1	2–1	Friendly
17	1 March 2012	GSZ Stadium, Larnaca, Cyprus	Finland	1–0	2–1	2012 Cyprus Women's Cup
18	4 July 2012	Stade de la Source, Orléans, France	Romania	3–0	6–0	Friendly
19	4 July 2012	Stade de la Source, Orléans, France	Romania	4–0	6–0	Friendly
20	6 August 2012	Wembley Stadium, London, England	Japan	1–2	1–2	2012 Summer Olympics
21	15 September 2012	Stade de Roudourou, Guingamp, France	Republic of Ireland	2–0	4–0	UEFA Women's Euro 2013 qualification
22	15 September 2012	Stade de Roudourou, Guingamp, France	Republic of Ireland	3–0	4–0	UEFA Women's Euro 2013 qualification
23	19 September 2012	Tynecastle Park, Edinburgh, Scotland	Scotland	2–0	5–0	UEFA Women's Euro 2013 qualification
24	19 September 2012	Tynecastle Park, Edinburgh, Scotland	Scotland	4–0	5–0	UEFA Women's Euro 2013 qualification
25	24 October 2012	Jan Louwers Stadion, Eindhoven, Netherlands	Netherlands	1–1	1–1	Friendly
26	6 March 2013	Stade Marcel Picot, Nancy, France	Brazil	1–1	2–2	Friendly
27	12 July 2013	Nya Parken, Norrköping, Sweden	Russia	3–0	3–1	UEFA Women's Euro 2013
28	18 July 2013	Linköping Arena, Linköping, Sweden	England	1–0	3–0	UEFA Women's Euro 2013
29	25 October 2013	Stade Pierre Brisson, Beauvais, France	Poland	1–0	6–0	Friendly
30	25 October 2013	Stade Pierre Brisson, Beauvais, France	Poland	3–0	6–0	Friendly
31	23 November 2013	Lovech Stadium, Lovech, Bulgaria	Bulgaria	10–0	10–0	2015 FIFA Women's World Cup qualification
32	28 November 2013	MMArena, Le Mans, France	Bulgaria	2–0	14–0	2015 FIFA Women's World Cup qualification
33	28 November 2013	MMArena, Le Mans, France	Bulgaria	7–0	14–0	2015 FIFA Women's World Cup qualification
34	28 November 2013	MMArena, Le Mans, France	Bulgaria	10–0	14–0	2015 FIFA Women's World Cup qualification
35	28 November 2013	MMArena, Le Mans, France	Bulgaria	14–0	14–0	2015 FIFA Women's World Cup qualification
36	20 August 2014	Bozsik József Stadion, Budapest, Hungary	Hungary	1–0	4–0	2015 FIFA Women's World Cup qualification
37	20 August 2014	Bozsik József Stadion, Budapest, Hungary	Hungary	2–0	4–0	2015 FIFA Women's World Cup qualification
38	22 November 2014	Stade Francis Le Basser, Laval, France	New Zealand	1–0	2–1	Friendly
39	26 November 2014	Stade de Gerland, Lyon, France	Brazil	1–0	2–0	Friendly
40	8 February 2015	Stade du Moustoir, Lorient, France	United States	1–0	2–0	Friendly
41	4 March 2015	Estádio Municipal Bela Vista, Parchal, Portugal	Portugal	1–0	1–0	2015 Algarve Cup
42	6 March 2015	Estádio Algarve, Algarve, Portugal	Denmark	1–0	4–1	2015 Algarve Cup
43	9 March 2015	Estádio Municipal Bela Vista, Parchal, Portugal	Japan	2–1	3–1	2015 Algarve Cup
44	9 April 2015	Stade Robert Bobin, Bondoufle, France	Canada	1–0	1–0	Friendly
45	9 June 2015	Moncton Stadium, Moncton, Canada	England	1–0	1–0	2015 FIFA Women's World Cup
46	17 June 2015	TD Place Stadium, Ottawa, Canada	Mexico	3–0	5–0	2015 FIFA Women's World Cup
47	17 June 2015	TD Place Stadium, Ottawa, Canada	Mexico	4–0	5–0	2015 FIFA Women's World Cup
48	22 September 2015	MMArena, Le Mans, France	Romania	2–0	3–0	UEFA Women's Euro 2017 qualification
49	22 September 2015	MMArena, Le Mans, France	Romania	3–0	3–0	UEFA Women's Euro 2017 qualification
50	27 November 2015	Qemal Stafa Stadium, Tirana, Albania	Albania	3–0	6–0	UEFA Women's Euro 2017 qualification
51	27 November 2015	Qemal Stafa Stadium, Tirana, Albania	Albania	6–0	6–0	UEFA Women's Euro 2017 qualification
52	1 December 2015	Katerini Stadium, Katerini, Greece	Greece	3–0	3–0	UEFA Women's Euro 2017 qualification
53	3 June 2016	Roazhon Park, Rennes, France	Greece	1–0	1–0	UEFA Women's Euro 2017 qualification
54	3 August 2016	Mineirão, Belo Horizonte, Brazil	Colombia	2–0	4–0	2016 Summer Olympics
55	9 August 2016	Itaipava Arena Fonte Nova, Salvador, Brazil	New Zealand	1–0	3–0	2016 Summer Olympics
56	20 September 2016	Stade Sébastien Charléty, Paris, France	Albania	3–0	6–0	UEFA Women's Euro 2017 qualification
57	20 September 2016	Stade Sébastien Charléty, Paris, France	Albania	5–0	6–0	UEFA Women's Euro 2017 qualification
58	26 November 2016	MMArena, Le Mans, France	Spain	1–0	1–0	Friendly
59	7 March 2017	Robert F. Kennedy Memorial Stadium, Washington, D.C., United States	United States	2–0	3–0	2017 SheBelieves Cup
60	7 April 2017	Stadion Galgenwaard, Utrecht, Netherlands	Netherlands	2–0	2–1	Friendly
61	18 July 2017	Koning Willem II Stadion, Tilburg, Netherlands	Iceland	1–0	1–0	UEFA Women's Euro 2017
62	18 September 2017	Stade de l'Épopée, Calais, France	Spain	2–0	3–1	Friendly
63	23 October 2017	Stade Auguste-Delaune, Reims, France	Ghana	5–0	8–0	Friendly
64	23 October 2017	Stade Auguste-Delaune, Reims, France	Ghana	6–0	8–0	Friendly
65	4 March 2018	Red Bull Arena, Harrison, United States	United States	1–1	1–1	2018 SheBelieves Cup
66	7 March 2018	Exploria Stadium, Orlando, United States	Germany	2–0	3–0	2018 SheBelieves Cup
67	6 April 2018	MMArena, Le Mans, France	Nigeria	1–0	8–0	Friendly
68	9 April 2018	Roazhon Park, Rennes, France	Canada	1–0	1–0	Friendly
69	1 September 2018	Stade de la Licorne, Amiens, France	Mexico	3–0	4–0	Friendly
70	1 September 2018	Stade de la Licorne, Amiens, France	Mexico	4–0	4–0	Friendly
71	5 October 2018	Stade Geoffroy-Guichard, Saint-Étienne, France	Australia	1–0	2–0	Friendly
72	5 October 2018	Stade Geoffroy-Guichard, Saint-Étienne, France	Australia	2–0	2–0	Friendly
73	9 October 2018	Stade des Alpes, Grenoble, France	Cameroon	3–0	6–0	Friendly
74	4 April 2019	Stade de l'Abbé-Deschamps, Auxerre, France	Japan	2–1	3–1	Friendly
75	7 June 2019	Parc des Princes, Paris, France	South Korea	1–0	4–0	2019 FIFA Women's World Cup
76	12 June 2019	Allianz Riviera, Nice, France	Norway	2–1	2–1	2019 FIFA Women's World Cup
77	31 August 2019	Stade Gabriel Montpied, Clermont-Ferrand, France	Spain	1–0	2–0	Friendly
78	4 October 2019	Stade des Costières, Nîmes, France	Iceland	1–0	4–0	Friendly
79	4 October 2019	Stade des Costières, Nîmes, France	Iceland	2–0	4–0	Friendly
80	8 October 2019	Kazhymukan Munaitpasov Stadium, Shymkent, Kazakhstan	Kazakhstan	2–0	3–0	UEFA Women's Euro 2022 qualification
81	22 September 2020	Toše Proeski Arena, Skopje, North Macedonia	North Macedonia	1–0	7–0	UEFA Women's Euro 2022 qualification
82	22 September 2020	Toše Proeski Arena, Skopje, North Macedonia	North Macedonia	2–0	7–0	UEFA Women's Euro 2022 qualification
83	23 October 2020	Stade de la Source, Orléans, France	North Macedonia	2–0	11–0	UEFA Women's Euro 2022 qualification
84	23 October 2020	Stade de la Source, Orléans, France	North Macedonia	3–0	11–0	UEFA Women's Euro 2022 qualification
85	23 October 2020	Stade de la Source, Orléans, France	North Macedonia	9–0	11–0	UEFA Women's Euro 2022 qualification
86	23 October 2020	Stade de la Source, Orléans, France	North Macedonia	11–0	11–0	UEFA Women's Euro 2022 qualification
87	7 April 2023	Stade Gabriel Montpied, Clermont-Ferrand, France	Colombia	2–2	5–2	Friendly
88	7 April 2023	Stade Gabriel Montpied, Clermont-Ferrand, France	Colombia	3–2	5–2	Friendly
89	6 July 2023	Tallaght Stadium, Dublin, Ireland	Republic of Ireland	2–0	3–0	Friendly
90	29 July 2023	Lang Park, Brisbane, Australia	Brazil	1–0	2–1	2023 FIFA Women's World Cup
91	8 August 2023	Hindmarsh Stadium, Adelaide, Australia	Morocco	3–0	4–0	2023 FIFA Women's World Cup
92	8 August 2023	Hindmarsh Stadium, Adelaide, Australia	Morocco	4–0	4–0	2023 FIFA Women's World Cup
93	1 December 2023	Roazhon Park, Rennes, France	Austria	2–0	3–0	2023–24 UEFA Women's Nations League
94	30 November 2024	Stade Raymond Kopa, Angers, France	Nigeria	1–0	2–1	Friendly

== Statistics ==
As of match played 4 April 2025

Appearances and goals by year
National team	Year	Apps	Goals
France	2009	16	3
France	2010	11	5
France	2011	20	7
France	2012	20	10
France	2013	16	10
France	2014	14	4
France	2015	19	13
France	2016	14	6
France	2017	17	6
France	2018	9	9
France	2019	11	7
France	2020	7	6
France	2021	1	0
France	2023	13	7
France	2024	9	1
France	2025	3	0
Total		200	94

Goals by competition
Competition	Goals
Friendlies	45
UEFA Women's Euro qualifiers	22
FIFA Women's World Cup qualifiers	12
FIFA Women's World Cup	8
UEFA Women's Euro	3
Summer Olympics	3
UEFA Women's Nations League	1
Total	94

== See also ==
- List of top international women's football goal scorers by country
- List of women's footballers with 100 or more international goals
