= Lazaros =

Lazaros is a Greek given name. Notable people with the name include:

- Lazaros Agadakos (born 1980), Greek professional basketball player
- Lazaros Arkhontopoulos (born 1958), Greek alpine skier
- Lazaros Charitonidis (born 1989), Greek footballer
- Lazaros Christodoulopoulos (born 1986), Greek professional footballer
- Lazaros Eleftheriadis (born 1997), Greek professional footballer
- Lazaros Fotias (born 1991), Greek professional footballer
- Lazaros Fytalis (1831–1909), Greek sculptor
- Lazaros of Mount Galesios (c. 972/981 – 1053), Byzantine monk and stylite
- Lazaros Iakovou (born 1976), Cypriot defender
- Lazaros Kountouriotis (1769–1852), Greek Senator, major figure of the Greek War of Independence
- Lazaros Kyrilidis (born 1963), Greek football midfielder
- Lazaros Lamprou (born 1997), Greek professional footballer
- Konstantinos Lazaros (born 1877), Greek tug of war athlete
- Lazaros Loizidis (born 1976), Greek Olympic wrestler
- Lazaros Orfanidis (born 1995), Greek professional footballer
- Lazaros Papadopoulos (born 1980), Greek professional basketball player
- Lazaros Papadopoulos (footballer) (born 1950), Greek professional footballer
- Lazaros Petropoulakis (born 1925), Greek sprinter
- Lazaros Rota (born 1997), Greek professional footballer
- Lazaros Sarantoglou (1862–1924), building contractor and philanthropist
- Lazaros Semos (born 1975), Greek football defender
- Lazaros Sochos (1862–1911), Greek sculptor
- Lazaros Theodorelis (born 1982), Greek professional footballer
- Lazaros Tosounidis (born 1963), Greek cross-country skier
- Lazaros Tsamis (1878–1933), Aromanian merchant who participated in the Macedonian Struggle
- Lazaros Varzis, Greek chieftain of the Macedonian Struggle
- Lazaros Vizantiadis (1938–2008), Greek chess International Master
- Lazaros Voreadis (born 1960), Greek basketball referee

== See also ==
- Maccabi Lazaros Holon F.C.
- Church of Ayios Lazaros, Larnaca, 9th century church in Cyprus
