= List of top international women's football goalscorers by country =

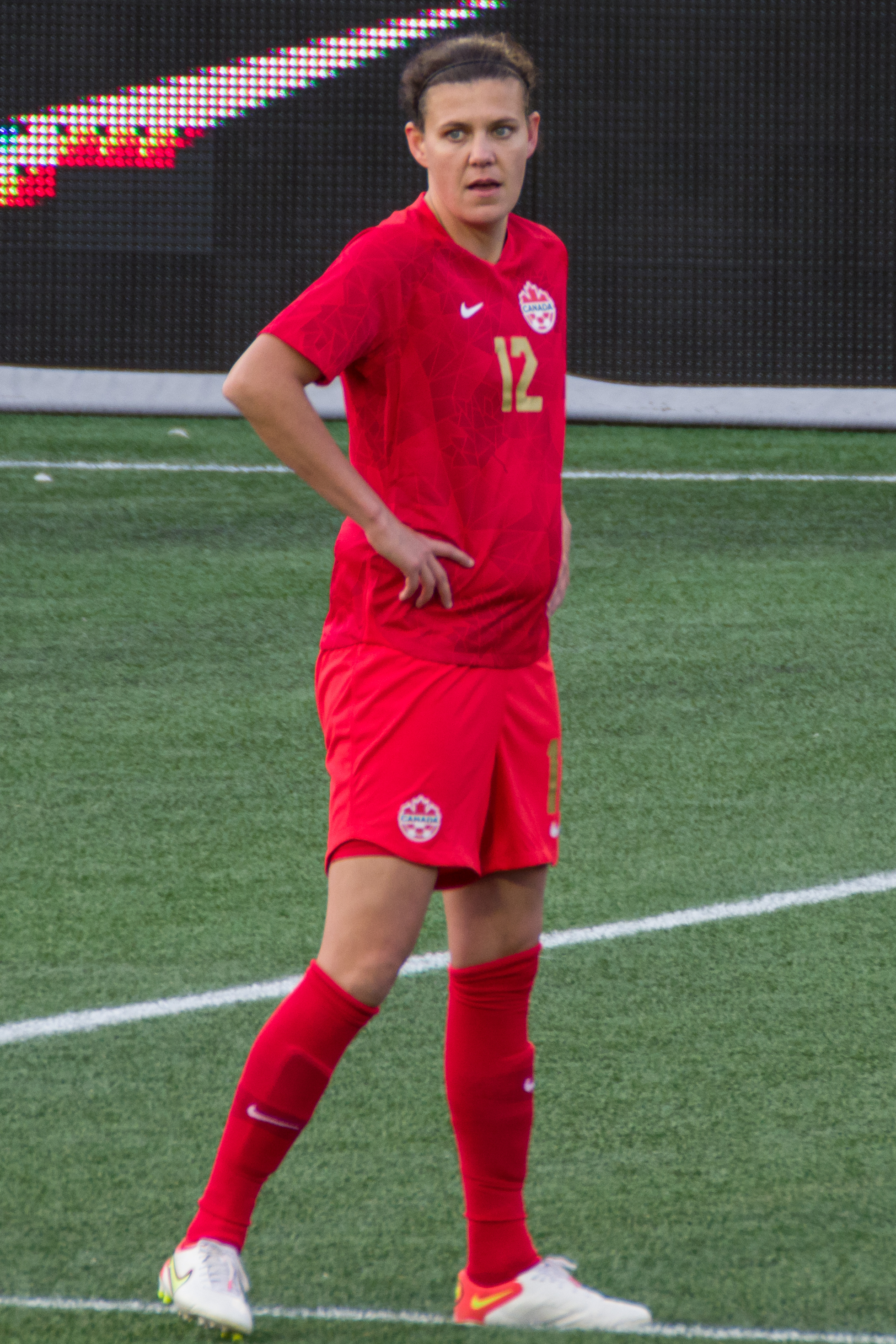
Christine Sinclair of Canada is the all-time leading goalscorer for women's national teams.

This page lists the top all-time goalscorer for each women's national football team. This list is not an all-time top international goalscorers list, as several countries have two or more players with more goals than another country's top scorer. It simply lists only the top scorer for each country.

Since January 2020, Canadian forward Christine Sinclair is the leading all-time international goalscorer. She overtook Abby Wambach of the United States, who had held the top position for over six years. Wambach's former teammate Mia Hamm topped the list between 1999 and 2013, who was preceded by Italian player Elisabetta Vignotto.

== List of top scorers by country ==
As of 13 October 2026
Players in bold are still active at international level.
Players in italics also hold the record for most caps for their nation.
Rank is a count of the FIFA nations.

Rank	Player	Country	Goals	Caps	Ratio	First cap	Last cap	Ref.
1	Christine Sinclair	Canada	190	331	0.57	12 March 2000	5 December 2023	
2	Abby Wambach	United States	184	255	0.72	9 September 2001	16 December 2015	
3	**Maysa Jbarah**	Jordan	147	153 (Note: 11 matches are not recognized by FIFA.)	0.95	18 September 2005	9 June 2026	
4	Birgit Prinz	Germany	128	214	0.60	27 July 1994	30 June 2011	
5	**Marta**	Brazil	121	200	0.61	23 April 2003	2 August 2025	
6	Julie Fleeting	Scotland	116	118	0.98	17 November 1996	8 February 2015	
7	Patrizia Panico	Italy	110	204	0.54	8 April 1996	27 November 2014	
8	**Tessa Wullaert**	Belgium	105	158	0.66	20 August 2011	9 June 2026	
9	**Vivianne Miedema**	Netherlands	104	132	0.79	26 September 2013	7 March 2026	
10	Portia Modise	South Africa	101	124	0.81	14 November 2000	11 March 2015	
11	**Eugénie Le Sommer**	France	94	200	0.47	12 February 2009	4 April 2025	
12	Sun Wen	China	89	126	0.71	29 May 1991	15 March 2006	
13	Lotta Schelin	Sweden	88	185	0.48	16 March 2004	29 July 2017	
14	**Win Theingi Tun**	Myanmar	85	90	0.94	2014	11 December 2025	
14	**Pernille Harder**	Denmark	85	173	0.49	24 October 2009	9 June 2026	
16	Homare Sawa	Japan	83	205	0.40	6 December 1993	5 July 2015	
17	Maribel Domínguez	Mexico	82	116	0.71	18 August 1998	15 February 2016	
18	Perpetua Nkwocha	Nigeria	80	99	0.81	1999	12 June 2015	
19	Margrét Lára Viðarsdóttir	Iceland	79	124	0.64	14 June 2003	8 October 2019	
20	**Sam Kerr**	Australia	75	139	0.54	7 February 2009	15 April 2026	
20	**Ji So-yun**	South Korea	75	175	0.43	30 October 2006	18 March 2026	
20	**Ana-Maria Crnogorčević**	Switzerland	75	180	0.42	12 August 2009	18 April 2026	
23	Fanny Vágó	Hungary	74	146	0.51	14 March 2007	22 February 2023	
24	**Ewa Pajor**	Poland	71	109	0.65	20 August 2013	18 April 2026	
25	**Huỳnh Như**	Vietnam	70	124	0.56	16 October 2011	10 March 2026	
26	**Sabitra Bhandari**	Nepal	68	61	1.11	12 November 2014	27 October 2025	
27	Isabell Herlovsen	Norway	67	133	0.50	11 March 2005	8 October 2019	
28	**Khadija Shaw**	Jamaica	66	48	1.38	23 August 2015	18 April 2026	
28	**Daryna Apanashchenko**	Ukraine	66	157	0.42	12 May 2002	14 April 2026	
30	Linda Sällström	Finland	64	157	0.41	31 May 2007	28 October 2025	
31	**Raquel Rodríguez**	Costa Rica	58	123	0.47	20 October 2007	27 June 2025	
32	**Barbra Banda**	Zambia	57	63	0.90	6 March 2016	31 July 2024	
32	Gabriela Enache	Romania	57	92	0.62	5 June 1996	2007	
32	**Jennifer Hermoso**	Spain	57	125	0.46	21 June 2012	2 December 2025	
35	**Mateja Zver**	Slovenia	56	125	0.45	10 March 2007	18 April 2026	
36	Amber Hearn	New Zealand	54	125	0.43	18 February 2004	9 June 2018	
36	Olivia O'Toole	Republic of Ireland	54	130+	0.42	8 December 1991	30 October 2008	
38	Nina Burger	Austria	53	109	0.49	1 September 2005	9 April 2019	
39	Gabriela Chlumecká	Czech Republic	52	66	0.79	21 June 1993	26 May 2007	
39	Ellen White	England	52	113	0.46	25 March 2010	31 July 2022	
41	**Madeleine Ngono Mani**	Cameroon	49	109	0.45	2002	2020	
42	**Ngangom Bala Devi**	India	48	58	0.83	20 October 2007	27 October 2024	
42	Jess Fishlock	Wales	48	166	0.29	15 March 2006	25 October 2025	
44	**Armisa Kuč**	Montenegro	43	96	0.45	13 March 2012	18 April 2026	
45	Anastassia Morkovkina	Estonia	40	75	0.53	7 March 1997	28 August 2015	
46	Edite Fernandes	Portugal	39	132	0.30	21 December 1997	16 September 2016	
47	**Sabina Khatun**	Bangladesh	38	61	0.62	2 February 2010	30 October 2024	
47	Rachel Furness	Northern Ireland	38	95	0.40	9 March 2005	27 October 2023	
49	**Nérilia Mondésir**	Haiti	37	37	1.00	21 August 2015	30 November 2025	
50	Naïma Bouhani	Algeria	36	61	0.59	2003	19 February 2025	
51	Amy Thompson	Luxembourg	35	54	0.65	3 March 2011	9 June 2026	
52	**Patrícia Hmírová**	Slovakia	32	134	0.24	27 May 2012	18 April 2026	
53	**Sarina Bolden**	Philippines	31	52	0.60	6 April 2018	30 October 2024	
53	**Heidi Sevdal**	Faroe Islands	31	101	0.31	18 November 2006	18 April 2026	
55	Silvi Jan	Israel	29	23	1.26	2 November 1997	10 May 2007	
56	**Yağmur Uraz**	Turkey	28	66	0.42	20 November 2006	4 June 2024	
57	**Karlīna Miksone**	Latvia	27	83	0.33	6 February 2015	9 June 2026	
57	**Florencia Bonsegundo**	Argentina	27	83	0.33	8 March 2014	9 June 2026	
57	**Francisca Lara**	Chile	27	94	0.29	9 December 2009	4 April 2025	
60	**Marta Cox**	Panama	26	66	0.39	20 May 2014	28 October 2025	
60	Maria Lazarou	Greece	26	111	0.23	3 July 1991	14 August 2004	
60	Dorianne Theuma	Malta	26	118	0.22	10 August 2003	31 May 2024	
63	**Ivana Rudelić**	Croatia	24	66	0.36	4 March 2015	18 April 2026	
64	**Megi Doçi**	Albania	23	72	0.32	14 June 2014	18 April 2026	
65	**Ghizlane Chebbak**	Morocco	22	69	0.32	8 March 2008	31 October 2023	
66	**Jovana Damnjanović**	Serbia	21	66	0.31	23 February 2010	2 December 2025	
67	**Al Bandari Mobarak**	Saudi Arabia	18	35	0.51	20 February 2022	2 December 2025	
67	**Christy Maalouf**	Lebanon	18	33	0.55	24 August 2021	13 October 2026	
69	**Zahra Ghanbari**	Iran	17	65	0.26	21 May 2013	25 September 2021	
70	**Teona Bakradze**	Georgia	15	60	0.25	12 April 2016	27 October 2025	
71	**Belén Aquino**	Uruguay	10	15	0.67	24 May 2019	13 July 2024	

== Record progression ==
Since the early 1980s there have been four players who have topped the all-time global goal scorers list.

Goals	Name	Country	Start	End	Span	Ref
107	Elisabetta Vignotto (Note: Vignotto reportedly scored 107 or 108 goals. The Italian Football Federation lists her record as 97 goals in 95 matches.)	Italy	1982	22 May 1999	16–17 years	
158	Mia Hamm	United States	22 May 1999	20 June 2013	14 years, 29 days	
184	Abby Wambach	United States	20 June 2013	30 January 2020	6 years, 224 days	
190	Christine Sinclair	Canada	30 January 2020	ongoing	6 years, 282 days	

== See also ==
- List of women's footballers with 100 or more international goals
- List of women's footballers with 100 or more international caps
- List of men's footballers with 50 or more international goals
- List of women's national association football teams
