= 2015 UEFA European Under-19 Championship =

2015 Ευρωπαϊκό πρωτάθλημα ποδοσφαίρου Κ-19

Tournament details
- Host country: Greece
- Dates: 6–19 July
- Teams: 8 (from 1 confederation)
- Venues: 3 (in 3 host cities)

Final positions
- Champions: Spain (10th title)
- Runners-up: Russia

Tournament statistics
- Matches played: 15
- Goals scored: 36 (2.4 per match)
- Attendance: 70,612 (4,707 per match)
- Top scorer: (Spain) Borja Mayoral (3 goals)
- Best player: (Spain) Marco Asensio

The 2015 UEFA European Under-19 Championship was the 14th edition of the UEFA European Under-19 Championship (64th edition if the Under-18 and Junior eras are included), the annual European youth football competition contested by the men's under-19 national teams of the member associations of UEFA. Greece hosted the tournament. Players born on or after 1 January 1996 were eligible to participate in this competition.

== Qualification ==
All 54 UEFA nations entered the competition and with the hosts Greece qualifying automatically, the other 53 teams competed in the qualifying competition to determine the remaining seven spots in the final tournament. The qualifying competition consisted of two rounds: Qualifying round, which took place in autumn 2014, and Elite round, which took place in spring 2015.

=== Qualified teams ===
The following eight teams qualified for the final tournament.

Note: All appearance statistics include only U-19 era (since 2002).

Team	Method of qualification	Finals appearance	Last appearance	Previous best performance
Greece	Hosts	6th	2012	Runners-up (2007, 2012)
Spain	Elite round Group 1 winners	11th	2013	Champions (2002, 2004, 2006, 2007, 2011, 2012)
Germany	Elite round Group 2 winners	7th	2014	Champions (2008, 2014)
Russia	Elite round Group 3 winners	2nd	2007	Group stage (2007)
Netherlands	Elite round Group 4 winners	3rd	2013	Group stage (2010, 2013)
Ukraine	Elite round Group 5 winners	4th	2014	Champions (2009)
Austria	Elite round Group 6 winners	6th	2014	Semi-finals (2003, 2006, 2014)
France	Elite round Group 7 winners	8th	2013	Champions (2005, 2010)

=== Final draw ===
The final draw was held in Katerini, Greece on 9 June 2015 at 17:00 EEST (UTC+3). The eight teams were drawn into two groups of four teams. There were no seeding except that the hosts Greece were assigned to position A1 in the draw.

== Venues ==
The competition was played at three venues in three host cities, Katerini and Veria in Central Macedonia, and Larissa in Thessaly.

Larissa	Veria	Katerini
AEL FC Arena	Municipal Stadium of Veria	Municipal Stadium of Katerini
39°36′55.5″N 22°23′57.8″E	40°32′02.9″N 22°12′08.2″E	40°15′40.3″N 22°30′44.0″E
Capacity: 16,118	Capacity: 7,000	Capacity: 4,956
2015 UEFA European Under-19 Championship is located in Greece

== Squads ==
Each national team had to submit a squad of 18 players.

== Match officials ==
A total of 6 referees, 8 assistant referees and 2 fourth officials were appointed for the final tournament.

Referees

- Tamás Bognár (Hungary)
- Andreas Ekberg (Sweden)
- Marco Guida (Italy)
- Georgi Kabakov (Bulgaria)
- Anthony Taylor (England)
- Andris Treimanis (Latvia)

Assistant referees

- (Czech Republic) Petr Blazej (Czech Republic)
- Ricardo Fernandes Morais (Luxembourg)
- Vital Jobin (Switzerland)
- Tomaz Klančnik (Slovenia)
- (North Macedonia) Dejan Nedelkoski (Macedonia)
- Neeme Neemlaid (Estonia)
- Nemanja Petrović (Serbia)
- Dennis Rasmussen (Denmark)

Fourth officials

- Athanasios Giahos (Greece)
- Andreas Pappas (Greece)

== Group stage ==
2015 UEFA European Under-19 Championship teams and final classification

Group winners and runners-up advanced to the semi-finals.

Tiebreakers

if two or more teams were equal on points on completion of the group matches, the following tie-breaking criteria were applied, in the order given, to determine the rankings:

1. Higher number of points obtained in the group matches played among the teams in question;
2. Superior goal difference resulting from the group matches played among the teams in question;
3. Higher number of goals scored in the group matches played among the teams in question;
4. If, after having applied criteria 1 to 3, teams still had an equal ranking, criteria 1 to 3 were reapplied exclusively to the group matches between the teams in question to determine their final rankings. If this procedure did not lead to a decision, criteria 5 to 9 applied;
5. Superior goal difference in all group matches;
6. Higher number of goals scored in all group matches;
7. If only two teams had the same number of points, and they were tied according to criteria 1 to 6 after having met in the last round of the group stage, their rankings were determined by a penalty shoot-out (not used if more than two teams had the same number of points, or if their rankings were not relevant for qualification for the next stage).
8. Lower disciplinary points total based only on yellow and red cards received in the group matches (red card = 3 points, yellow card = 1 point, expulsion for two yellow cards in one match = 3 points);
9. Drawing of lots.

All times were local, EEST (UTC+3).

=== Group A ===
Pos	Team	Pld	W	D	L	GF	GA	GD	Pts	Qualification
1	France	3	3	0	0	6	1	+5	9	Advance to knockout stage
2	Greece (H)	3	1	1	1	2	2	0	4	Advance to knockout stage
3	Austria	3	0	2	1	2	3	−1	2	
4	Ukraine	3	0	1	2	3	7	−4	1	

Source: UEFA
(H) Hosts
6 July 2015
20:30

Greece	2–0	Ukraine
Orphanides 20'; Karahalios 76'	Report

Municipal Stadium of Veria, Veria
Attendance: 3,430
Referee: Anthony Taylor (England)
6 July 2015
21:00

Austria	0–1	France
	Report	Blin 34'

Municipal Stadium of Katerini, Katerini
Attendance: 3,687
Referee: Georgi Kabakov (Bulgaria)

9 July 2015
19:00

Ukraine	1–3	France
Zubkov 55'	Report	Guirassy 31'; Dembélé 62'; Lukyanchuk 90+2' (o.g.)

AEL FC Arena, Larissa
Attendance: 1,619
Referee: Andris Treimanis (Latvia)
9 July 2015
22:00

Greece	0–0	Austria
	Report

AEL FC Arena, Larissa
Attendance: 13,453
Referee: Andreas Ekberg (Sweden)

12 July 2015
21:00

France	2–0	Greece
Diakhaby 5'; Dembélé 64'	Report

Municipal Stadium of Katerini, Katerini
Attendance: 4,149
Referee: Marco Guida (Italy)
12 July 2015
21:00

Ukraine	2–2	Austria
Zubkov 14'; Luchkevych 63'	Report	Kvasina 47', 87'

Municipal Stadium of Veria, Veria
Attendance: 992
Referee: Tamás Bognár (Hungary)

=== Group B ===
Pos	Team	Pld	W	D	L	GF	GA	GD	Pts	Qualification
1	Russia	3	1	1	1	5	4	+1	4	Advance to knockout stage
2	Spain	3	1	1	1	5	4	+1	4	Advance to knockout stage
3	Netherlands	3	1	1	1	2	2	0	4	
4	Germany	3	1	1	1	3	5	−2	4	

Source: UEFA
7 July 2015
18:30

Netherlands	1–0	Russia
Van Amersfoort 44'	Report

AEL FC Arena, Larissa
Attendance: 2,038
Referee: Tamás Bognár (Hungary)
7 July 2015
21:45

Germany	0–3	Spain
	Report	Merino 8'; Mayoral 72' (pen.); Nahuel 90+3'

AEL FC Arena, Larissa
Attendance: 7,883
Referee: Marco Guida (Italy)

10 July 2015
19:00

Spain	1–3	Russia
Mayoral 13'	Report	Barinov 37'; Gasilin 48'; Sheydayev 54'

Municipal Stadium of Veria, Veria
Attendance: 1,322
Referee: Georgi Kabakov (Bulgaria)
10 July 2015
21:00

Germany	1–0	Netherlands
Rizzo 89'	Report

Municipal Stadium of Katerini, Katerini
Attendance: 3,753
Referee: Anthony Taylor (England)

13 July 2015
21:00

Russia	2–2	Germany
Kehrer 32' (o.g.); Bezdenezhnykh 45+2'	Report	Kehrer 12'; Werner 65'

Municipal Stadium of Katerini, Katerini
Attendance: 3,658
Referee: Andreas Ekberg (Sweden)
13 July 2015
21:00

Spain	1–1	Netherlands
Mirani 8' (o.g.)	Report	Van Amersfoort 54' (pen.)

Municipal Stadium of Veria, Veria
Attendance: 1,811
Referee: Andris Treimanis (Latvia)

== Knockout stage ==
In the knockout stage, extra time and penalty shoot-out were used to decide the winner if necessary.

=== Bracket ===
Semi-finals
16 July – Katerini
France	0
Spain	2
16 July – Larissa
Russia	4
Greece	0

Final
19 July – Katerini
Spain	2
Russia	0

=== Semi-finals ===
16 July 2015
19:00

Russia	4–0	Greece
Chernov 50', 79'; Gasilin 52'; Sheydayev 64' (pen.)	Report

AEL FC Arena, Larissa
Attendance: 14,856
Referee: Tamás Bognár (Hungary)

16 July 2015
21:45

France	0–2	Spain
	Report	Asensio 88', 90+5'

Municipal Stadium of Katerini, Katerini
Attendance: 3,812
Referee: Andreas Ekberg (Sweden)

=== Final ===
19 July 2015
21:00

Spain	2–0	Russia
Mayoral 39'; Nahuel 78'	Report

Municipal Stadium of Katerini, Katerini
Attendance: 4,149
Referee: Anthony Taylor (England)

== Goalscorers ==
3 goals

- (Spain) Borja Mayoral

2 goals

- (Austria) Marko Kvasina
- (France) Moussa Dembélé
- (Netherlands) Pelle van Amersfoort
- (Russia) Nikita Chernov
- (Russia) Aleksei Gasilin
- (Russia) Ramil Sheydayev
- (Spain) Marco Asensio
- (Spain) Matías Nahuel
- (Ukraine) Oleksandr Zubkov

1 goal

- (France) Alexis Blin
- (France) Mouctar Diakhaby
- (France) Serhou Guirassy
- (Germany) Thilo Kehrer
- (Germany) Gianluca Rizzo
- (Germany) Timo Werner
- (Greece) Zisis Karahalios
- (Greece) Petros Orphanides
- (Russia) Dmitri Barinov
- (Russia) Igor Bezdenezhnykh
- (Spain) Mikel Merino
- (Ukraine) Valeriy Luchkevych

1 own goal

- (Germany) Thilo Kehrer (playing against Russia)
- (Netherlands) Damon Mirani (playing against Spain)
- (Ukraine) Pavlo Lukyanchuk (playing against France)

Source: UEFA.com

== Awards ==
- Golden Player: (Spain) Marco Asensio
- Golden Boot: (Spain) Borja Mayoral (3 goals)

=== Team of the Tournament ===
2015 UEFA European Under-19 Championship Team of the Tournament
Position	Player	Nationality
Goalkeepers
GK	(Russia) Anton Mitryushkin	Russia
GK	(Spain) Antonio Sivera	Spain
Defenders
DF	(Netherlands) Terry Lartey Sanniez	Netherlands
DF	(Germany) Lukas Klünter	Germany
DF	(Russia) Denis Yakuba	Russia
DF	(France) Lucas Hernandez	France
DF	(Netherlands) Augustine Loof	Netherlands
DF	(Spain) Jesús Vallejo	Spain
Midfielders
MF	(France) Maxwel Cornet	France
MF	(Netherlands) Issa Kallon	Netherlands
MF	(Russia) Dmitri Barinov	Russia
MF	(Spain) Dani Ceballos	Spain
MF	(France) Kingsley Coman	France
MF	(Spain) Marco Asensio	Spain
MF	(Spain) Rodri	Spain
Forwards
FW	(Germany) Timo Werner	Germany
FW	(Russia) Ramil Sheydayev	Russia
FW	(Spain) Borja Mayoral	Spain

"Spain in seventh heaven with Greece triumph". UEFA.

Source: UEFA Technical Report
