= Orphanides =

Orphanides is a surname. Notable people with the surname include:

- Andreas G. Orphanides (born 1955), Cypriot professor and university administrator
- Athanasios Orphanides (born 1962), Cypriot economist
- Panicos Orphanides (born 1961), Cypriot football manager
- Theodoros G. Orphanides (1817–1886), Greek botanist

== See also ==
- Georgios Orphanidis (1859–1942), Greek sports shooter
- Orfanidis, surname
