= List of international goals scored by Vivianne Miedema =

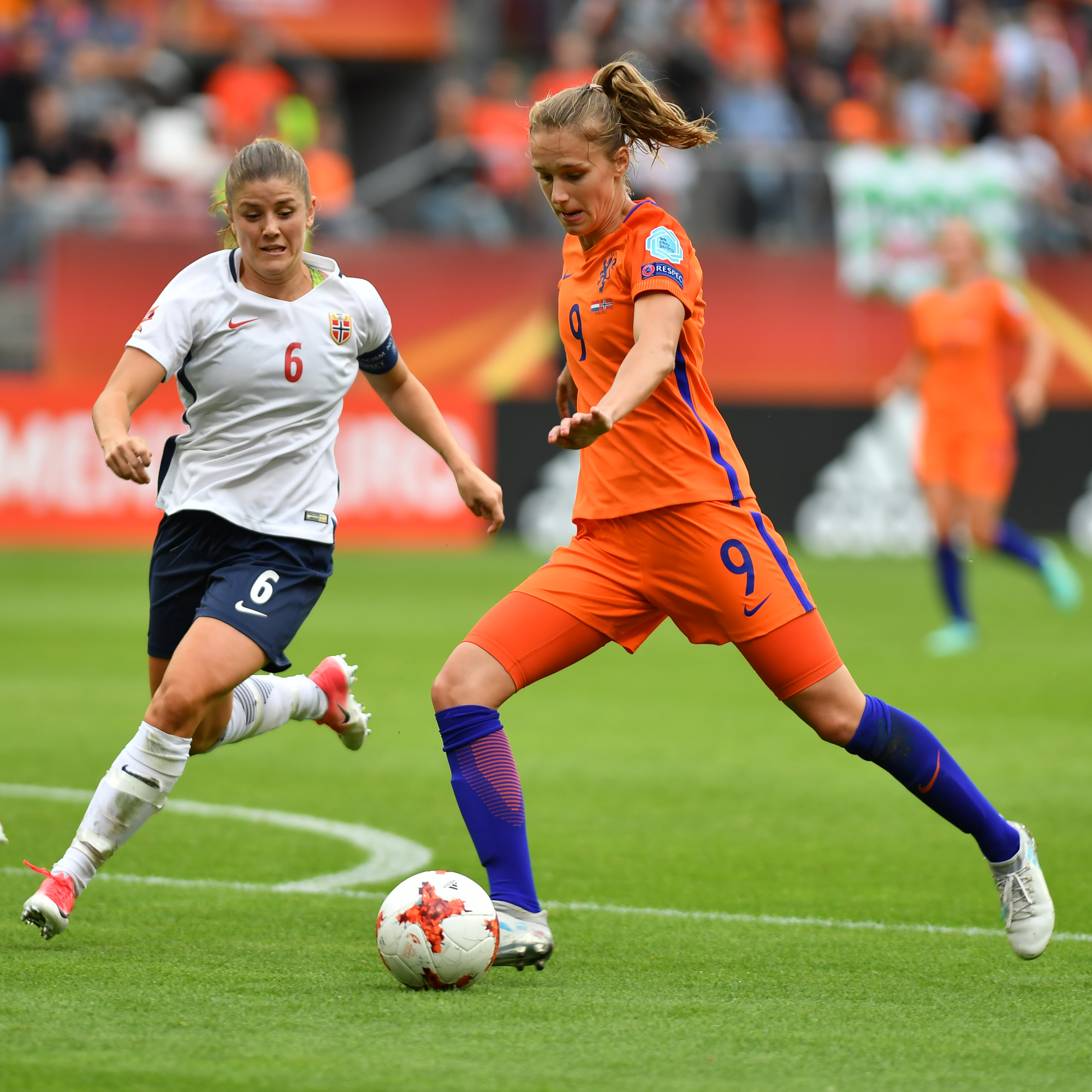
Vivianne Miedema (right) playing for the Netherlands during the UEFA Women's Euro 2017

Vivianne Miedema is a Dutch professional footballer who has played as a forward for the Netherlands women's national football team since 2013. She is the all-time top scorer for her country, for both women and men, and the first Dutch player and 19th woman to score one hundred international goals. On 26 September 2013, Miedema made her debut for the Dutch senior team aged seventeen. She was an 84th-minute substitute for Lieke Martens in a 4–0 win over Albania in the 2015 FIFA Women's World Cup qualification – UEFA Group 5. One month later in her second cap she scored her first goals, a hat-trick, in her country's 7–0 win over Portugal, after only having come onto the pitch as a substitute in the 75th minute.

Miedema helped the Dutch qualify for their first-ever FIFA World Cup finals, scoring all three of her side's goals in the two-leg final of the UEFA qualification play-offs against Italy in November 2014. She finished as the top scorer in the qualification campaign with 16 goals. At the finals in Canada, she played all four matches, three group stage games and the round of 16 match, a defeat against Japan. She did not score in Canada. At the 2017 UEFA Women's European Championship, held in the Netherlands, Miedema scored four times, including in the semi-final win over England and in the final against Denmark. Her goals helped secure the first ever title for the Dutch women.

In the 2019 FIFA Women's World Cup qualification – UEFA play-offs Miedema scored twice against Switzerland, taking her country to the World Cup finals in France, where she scored three times. On 15 June 2019, Miedema became the all-time top scorer of the Netherlands women's national football team after scoring her 60th goal in a 3–1 Group E win against Cameroon. She passed the record held by Manon Melis and extended her lead over the men's team's leading scorer at the time, Robin van Persie, who scored 50 goals before retiring. At the 2020 Olympics in Tokyo Miedema broke the record of most goals scored in a single Olympic tournament: 10. In 132 appearances for the senior national team as of March 2026, Miedema has scored 104 goals. None of her goals have come from penalty kicks.

She has scored eight hat-tricks: a double hat-trick (six goals) against Cyprus (2022), four goals against Zambia (2021) and South Korea (2025), and regular hat-tricks against Greece (2013), Russia (2017), and Portugal (twice, in 2013 and 2014). Her most productive year was 2017 with 20 goals from 21 games.

== International goals ==
"Score" represents the score in the match after Miedema's goal. "Score" and "Result" list the Netherlands' goal tally first. Cap represents the player's appearance in an international level match at senior level.

Goals by Miedema for the Netherlands' senior national team
G	C	Date	Venue	Opponent	Score	Result	Competition	R
1	2	26 October 2013	Estádio José de Carvalho, Maia, Portugal	Portugal	5–0	7–0	2015 FIFA Women's World Cup qualification	
2	2	26 October 2013	Estádio José de Carvalho, Maia, Portugal	Portugal	6–0	7–0	2015 FIFA Women's World Cup qualification	
3	2	26 October 2013	Estádio José de Carvalho, Maia, Portugal	Portugal	7–0	7–0	2015 FIFA Women's World Cup qualification	
4	3	30 October 2013	Kras Stadion, Volendam, Netherlands	Norway	1–1	1–2	2015 FIFA Women's World Cup qualification	
5	4	23 November 2013	Stadion Woudestein, Rotterdam, Netherlands	Greece	2–0	7–0	2015 FIFA Women's World Cup qualification	
6	4	23 November 2013	Stadion Woudestein, Rotterdam, Netherlands	Greece	3–0	7–0	2015 FIFA Women's World Cup qualification	
7	4	23 November 2013	Stadion Woudestein, Rotterdam, Netherlands	Greece	6–0	7–0	2015 FIFA Women's World Cup qualification	
8	5	12 February 2014	Oosterenkstadion, Zwolle, Netherlands	Belgium	1–0	1–1	2015 FIFA Women's World Cup qualification	
9	6	5 March 2014	GSZ Stadium, Larnaca, Cyprus	Australia	1–0	2–2	2014 Cyprus Women's Cup	
10	9	12 March 2014	GSZ Stadium, Larnaca, Cyprus	Switzerland	1–0	4–1	2014 Cyprus Women's Cup	
11	10	5 April 2014	Pankritio Stadium, Heraklion, Greece	Greece	3–0	6–0	2015 FIFA Women's World Cup qualification	
12	11	7 May 2014	Den Dreef, Leuven, Belgium	Belgium	1–0	2–0	2015 FIFA Women's World Cup qualification	
13	13	13 September 2014	De Koel, Venlo, Netherlands	Portugal	1–0	3–2	2015 FIFA Women's World Cup qualification	
14	13	13 September 2014	De Koel, Venlo, Netherlands	Portugal	2–1	3–2	2015 FIFA Women's World Cup qualification	
15	13	13 September 2014	De Koel, Venlo, Netherlands	Portugal	3–2	3–2	2015 FIFA Women's World Cup qualification	
16	17	22 November 2014	Kyocera Stadion, The Hague, Netherlands	Italy	1–1	1–1	2015 FIFA Women's World Cup qualification play-offs	
17	18	27 November 2014	Stadio Marcantonio Bentegodi, Verona, Italy	Italy	1–0	2–1	2015 FIFA Women's World Cup qualification play-offs	
18	18	27 November 2014	Stadio Marcantonio Bentegodi, Verona, Italy	Italy	2–0	2–1	2015 FIFA Women's World Cup qualification play-offs	
19	20	9 March 2015	GSP Stadium, Nicosia, Cyprus	England	1–0	1–1	2015 Cyprus Women's Cup	
20	28	17 September 2015	De Vijverberg, Doetinchem, Netherlands	Belarus	4–0	8–0	Friendly	
21	28	17 September 2015	De Vijverberg, Doetinchem, Netherlands	Belarus	6–0	8–0	Friendly	
22	32	25 January 2016	Spice Hotel, Belek, Turkey	Denmark	1–0	2–1	Friendly	
23	33	2 March 2016	Kyocera Stadion, The Hague, Netherlands	Switzerland	2–1	4–3	2016 UEFA Women's Olympic qualification	
24	35	9 March 2016	Het Kasteel, Rotterdam, Netherlands	Sweden	1–0	1–1	2016 UEFA Women's Olympic qualification	
25	37	7 June 2016	Mandemakers Stadion, Waalwijk, Netherlands	South Africa	1–0	2–0	Friendly	
26	37	7 June 2016	Mandemakers Stadion, Waalwijk, Netherlands	South Africa	2–0	2–0	Friendly	
27	39	20 October 2016	Tony Macaroni Arena, Livingston, Scotland	Scotland	1–0	7–0	Friendly	
28	39	20 October 2016	Tony Macaroni Arena, Livingston, Scotland	Scotland	3–0	7–0	Friendly	
29	40	25 October 2016	Scholz Arena, Aalen, Germany	Germany	2–4	2–4	Friendly	
30	41	20 January 2017	Pinatar Arena, San Pedro del Pinatar, Spain	Romania	6–1	7–1	Friendly	
31	41	20 January 2017	Pinatar Arena, San Pedro del Pinatar, Spain	Romania	7–1	7–1	Friendly	
32	42	24 January 2017	Pinatar Arena, San Pedro del Pinatar, Spain	Russia	1–0	4–0	Friendly	
33	42	24 January 2017	Pinatar Arena, San Pedro del Pinatar, Spain	Russia	2–0	4–0	Friendly	
34	42	24 January 2017	Pinatar Arena, San Pedro del Pinatar, Spain	Russia	4–0	4–0	Friendly	
35	44	3 March 2017	VRS António Sports Complex, Vila Real de Santo António, Portugal	Australia	1–3	2–3	2017 Algarve Cup	
36	46	8 March 2017	Estádio Algarve, Faro-Loulé, Portugal	Japan	3–2	3–2	2017 Algarve Cup	
37	48	11 April 2017	De Vijverberg, Doetinchem, Netherlands	Iceland	1–0	4–0	Friendly	
38	48	11 April 2017	De Vijverberg, Doetinchem, Netherlands	Iceland	2–0	4–0	Friendly	
39	50	13 June 2017	De Adelaarshorst, Deventer, Netherlands	Austria	2–0	3–0	Friendly	
40	51	8 July 2017	Sparta Stadion Het Kasteel, Rotterdam, Netherlands	Wales	3–0	5–0	Friendly	
41	51	8 July 2017	Sparta Stadion Het Kasteel, Rotterdam, Netherlands	Wales	4–0	5–0	Friendly	
42	55	29 July 2017	De Vijverberg, Doetinchem, Netherlands	Sweden	2–0	2–0	UEFA Women's Euro 2017	
43	56	3 August 2017	De Grolsch Veste, Enschede, Netherlands	England	1–0	3–0	UEFA Women's Euro 2017	
44	57	6 August 2017	De Grolsch Veste, Enschede, Netherlands	Denmark	1–1	4–2	UEFA Women's Euro 2017	
45	57	6 August 2017	De Grolsch Veste, Enschede, Netherlands	Denmark	4–2	4–2	UEFA Women's Euro 2017	
46	58	19 October 2017	NV Arena, Sankt Pölten, Austria	Austria	2–0	2–0	Friendly	
47	59	24 October 2017	Euroborg, Groningen, Netherlands	Norway	1–0	1–0	2019 FIFA Women's World Cup qualification	
48	60	24 November 2017	NTC Senec, Senec, Slovakia	Slovakia	3–0	5–0	2019 FIFA Women's World Cup qualification	
49	60	24 November 2017	NTC Senec, Senec, Slovakia	Slovakia	4–0	5–0	2019 FIFA Women's World Cup qualification	
50	63	6 April 2018	Philips Stadion, Eindhoven, Netherlands	Northern Ireland	3–0	7–0	2019 FIFA Women's World Cup qualification	
51	64	4 September 2018	Intility Arena, Oslo, Norway	Norway	1–2	1–2	2019 FIFA Women's World Cup qualification	
52	67	9 November 2018	Stadion Galgenwaard, Utrecht, Netherlands	Switzerland	3–0	3–0	2019 FIFA Women's World Cup qualification play-offs	
53	68	13 November 2018	LIPO Park, Schaffhausen, Switzerland	Switzerland	1–0	1–1	2019 FIFA Women's World Cup qualification play-offs	
54	69	19 January 2019	Green Point Stadium, Cape Town, South Africa	South Africa	2–0	2–1	Friendly	
55	72	6 March 2019	Estádio Municipal, Albufeira, Portugal	China	1–0	1–1	2019 Algarve Cup	
56	73	5 April 2019	GelreDome, Arnhem, Netherlands	Mexico	1–0	2–0	Friendly	
57	74	9 April 2019	AFAS Stadion, Alkmaar, Netherlands	Chile	5–0	7–0	Friendly	
58	75	1 June 2019	Philips Stadion, Eindhoven, Netherlands	Australia	2–0	3–0	Friendly	
59	77	15 June 2019	Stade du Hainaut, Valenciennes, France	Cameroon	1–0	3–1	2019 FIFA Women's World Cup	
60	77	15 June 2019	Stade du Hainaut, Valenciennes, France	Cameroon	3–1	3–1	2019 FIFA Women's World Cup	
61	80	29 June 2019	Stade du Hainaut, Valenciennes, France	Italy	1–0	2–0	2019 FIFA Women's World Cup	
62	83	30 August 2019	A. Le Coq Arena, Tallinn, Estonia	Estonia	1–0	7–0	2022 UEFA Women's Euro qualification	
63	83	30 August 2019	A. Le Coq Arena, Tallinn, Estonia	Estonia	5–0	7–0	2022 UEFA Women's Euro qualification	
64	84	4 October 2019	Fazanerija City Stadium, Murska Sobota, Slovenia	Slovenia	1–0	4–2	2022 UEFA Women's Euro qualification	
65	85	8 October 2019	Philips Stadion, Eindhoven, Netherlands	Russia	2–0	2–0	2022 UEFA Women's Euro qualification	
66	86	8 November 2019	Bornova Stadium, İzmir, Turkey	Turkey	3–0	8–0	2022 UEFA Women's Euro qualification	
67	86	8 November 2019	Bornova Stadium, İzmir, Turkey	Turkey	5–0	8–0	2022 UEFA Women's Euro qualification	
68	87	12 November 2019	GelreDome, Arnhem, Netherlands	Slovenia	3–1	4–1	2022 UEFA Women's Euro qualification	
69	87	12 November 2019	GelreDome, Arnhem, Netherlands	Slovenia	4–1	4–1	2022 UEFA Women's Euro qualification	
70	91	27 October 2020	Fadil Vokrri Stadium, Pristina, Kosovo	Kosovo	5–0	6–0	2022 UEFA Women's Euro qualification	
71	92	18 February 2021	King Baudouin Stadium, Belgium	Belgium	1–0	6–1	Friendly	
72	96	15 June 2021	De Grolsch Veste, Enschede, Netherlands	Norway	1–0	7–0	Friendly	
73	96	15 June 2021	De Grolsch Veste, Enschede, Netherlands	Norway	5–0	7–0	Friendly	
74	97	21 July 2021	Miyagi Stadium, Rifu, Japan	Zambia	1–0	10–3	2020 Summer Olympics	
75	97	21 July 2021	Miyagi Stadium, Rifu, Japan	Zambia	3–0	10–3	2020 Summer Olympics	
76	97	21 July 2021	Miyagi Stadium, Rifu, Japan	Zambia	4–1	10–3	2020 Summer Olympics	
77	97	21 July 2021	Miyagi Stadium, Rifu, Japan	Zambia	7–1	10–3	2020 Summer Olympics	
78	98	24 July 2021	Miyagi Stadium, Rifu, Japan	Brazil	1–0	3–3	2020 Summer Olympics	
79	98	24 July 2021	Miyagi Stadium, Rifu, Japan	Brazil	2–1	3–3	2020 Summer Olympics	
80	99	27 July 2021	Nissan Stadium, Yokohama, Japan	China	5–1	8–2	2020 Summer Olympics	
81	99	27 July 2021	Nissan Stadium, Yokohama, Japan	China	8–2	8–2	2020 Summer Olympics	
82	100	30 July 2021	Nissan Stadium, Yokohama, Japan	United States	1–0	2–2 (a.e.t.) (2–4 p)	2020 Summer Olympics	
83	100	30 July 2021	Nissan Stadium, Yokohama, Japan	United States	2–2	2–2 (a.e.t.) (2–4 p)	2020 Summer Olympics	
84	101	17 September 2021	Euroborg, Groningen, Netherlands	Czech Republic	1–1	1–1	2023 FIFA Women's World Cup qualification	
85	103	22 October 2021	AEK Arena, Larnaca, Cyprus	Cyprus	1–0	8–0	2023 FIFA Women's World Cup qualification	
86	107	8 April 2022	Euroborg, Groningen, Netherlands	Cyprus	1–0	12–0	2023 FIFA Women's World Cup qualification	
87	107	8 April 2022	Euroborg, Groningen, Netherlands	Cyprus	4–0	12–0	2023 FIFA Women's World Cup qualification	
88	107	8 April 2022	Euroborg, Groningen, Netherlands	Cyprus	5–0	12–0	2023 FIFA Women's World Cup qualification	
89	107	8 April 2022	Euroborg, Groningen, Netherlands	Cyprus	7–0	12–0	2023 FIFA Women's World Cup qualification	
90	107	8 April 2022	Euroborg, Groningen, Netherlands	Cyprus	10–0	12–0	2023 FIFA Women's World Cup qualification	
91	107	8 April 2022	Euroborg, Groningen, Netherlands	Cyprus	11–0	12–0	2023 FIFA Women's World Cup qualification	
92	108	12 April 2022	ADO Den Haag Stadium, The Hague, Netherlands	South Africa	3–1	5–1	Friendly	
93	111	2 July 2022	De Grolsch Veste, Enschede, Netherlands	Finland	1–0	2–0	Friendly	
94	111	2 July 2022	De Grolsch Veste, Enschede, Netherlands	Finland	2–0	2–0	Friendly	
95	114	2 September 2022	MAC³PARK Stadion, Zwolle, Netherlands	Scotland	1–0	2–1	Friendly	
96	120	16 July 2024	Brann Stadion, Bergen, Norway	Norway	1–1	1–1	2025 UEFA Women's Euro qualification	
97	124	8 April 2025	Cashpoint Arena, Altach, Austria	Austria	3–1	3–1	2025 UEFA Women's Nations League	
98	125	26 June 2025	Kooi Stadion, Leeuwarden, Netherlands	Finland	1–0	2–1	Friendly	
99	125	26 June 2025	Kooi Stadion, Leeuwarden, Netherlands	Finland	2–0	2–1	Friendly	
100	126	5 July 2025	Swissporarena, Lucerne, Switzerland	Wales	1–0	3–0	UEFA Women's Euro 2025	
101	130	2 December 2025	Mandemakers Stadion, Waalwijk, Netherlands	South Korea	1–0	5–0	Friendly	
102	130	2 December 2025	Mandemakers Stadion, Waalwijk, Netherlands	South Korea	2–0	5–0	Friendly	
103	130	2 December 2025	Mandemakers Stadion, Waalwijk, Netherlands	South Korea	3–0	5–0	Friendly	
104	130	2 December 2025	Mandemakers Stadion, Waalwijk, Netherlands	South Korea	4–0	5–0	Friendly	

== Hat-tricks ==
As of match played 7 March 2026

List of international hat-tricks scored by Vivianne Miedema
No.	Date	Venue	Opponent	Goals	Result	Competition
1	26 October 2013	Estádio José de Carvalho, Maia, Portugal	Portugal	3 (78’, 81’, 90+4’)	7–0	2015 FIFA Women's World Cup qualification
2	23 November 2013	Stadion Woudestein, Rotterdam, Netherlands	Greece	3 (23’, 29’, 64’)	7–0	2015 FIFA Women's World Cup qualification
3	13 September 2014	De Koel, Venlo, Netherlands	Portugal	3 (28’, 54’, 68’)	3–2	2015 FIFA Women's World Cup qualification
4	24 January 2017	Pinatar Arena, San Pedro del Pinatar, Spain	Russia	3 (42’, 59’, 90+1’)	4–0	Friendly
5	21 July 2021	Miyagi Stadium, Rifu, Japan	Zambia	4 (9’, 15’, 29’, 59’)	10–3	2020 Summer Olympics
6	8 April 2022	Euroborg, Groningen, Netherlands	Cyprus	6 (23’, 41’, 44’, 54’, 69’, 76’)	12–0	2023 FIFA Women's World Cup qualification
7	8 April 2022	Euroborg, Groningen, Netherlands	Cyprus	6 (23’, 41’, 44’, 54’, 69’, 76’)	12–0	2023 FIFA Women's World Cup qualification
8	2 December 2025	Mandemakers Stadion, Waalwijk, Netherlands	South Korea	4 (9’, 17’, 31’, 38’)	5–0	Friendly

== Statistics ==
As of match played 7 March 2026

Appearances and goals by year
National team	Year	Apps	Goals
Netherlands	2013	4	7
Netherlands	2014	14	11
Netherlands	2015	12	3
Netherlands	2016	10	8
Netherlands	2017	21	20
Netherlands	2018	7	4
Netherlands	2019	19	16
Netherlands	2020	4	1
Netherlands	2021	13	15
Netherlands	2022	11	10
Netherlands	2023	2	0
Netherlands	2024	3	1
Netherlands	2025	10	8
Netherlands	2026	2	0
Total		132	104

Goals by competition
Competition	Goals
Friendlies	36
FIFA World Cup qualifiers	31
UEFA European Championship qualifiers	10
FIFA World Cup finals	3
UEFA European Championship finals	5
UEFA Women's Nations League	1
Olympic Games	10
Other	8
Total	104

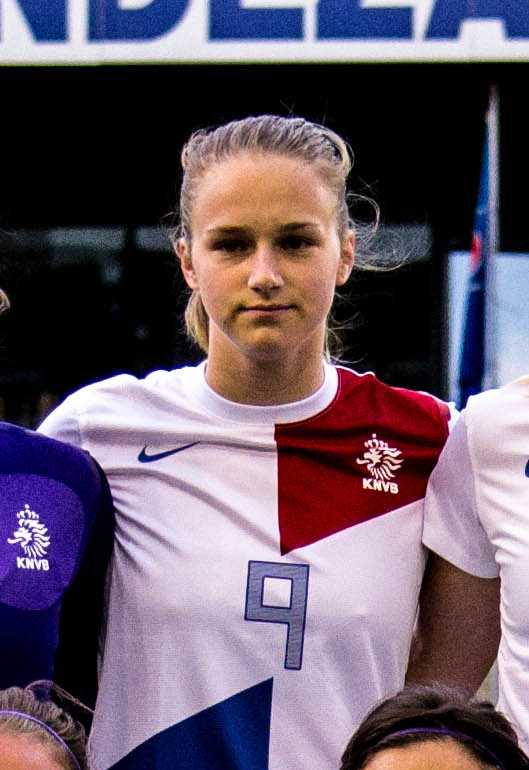
Vivianne Miedema in the Dutch national team jersey in 2014

== See also ==
- List of top international women's football goal scorers by country
- List of women's footballers with 100 or more international goals
