= List of international goals scored by Barbra Banda =

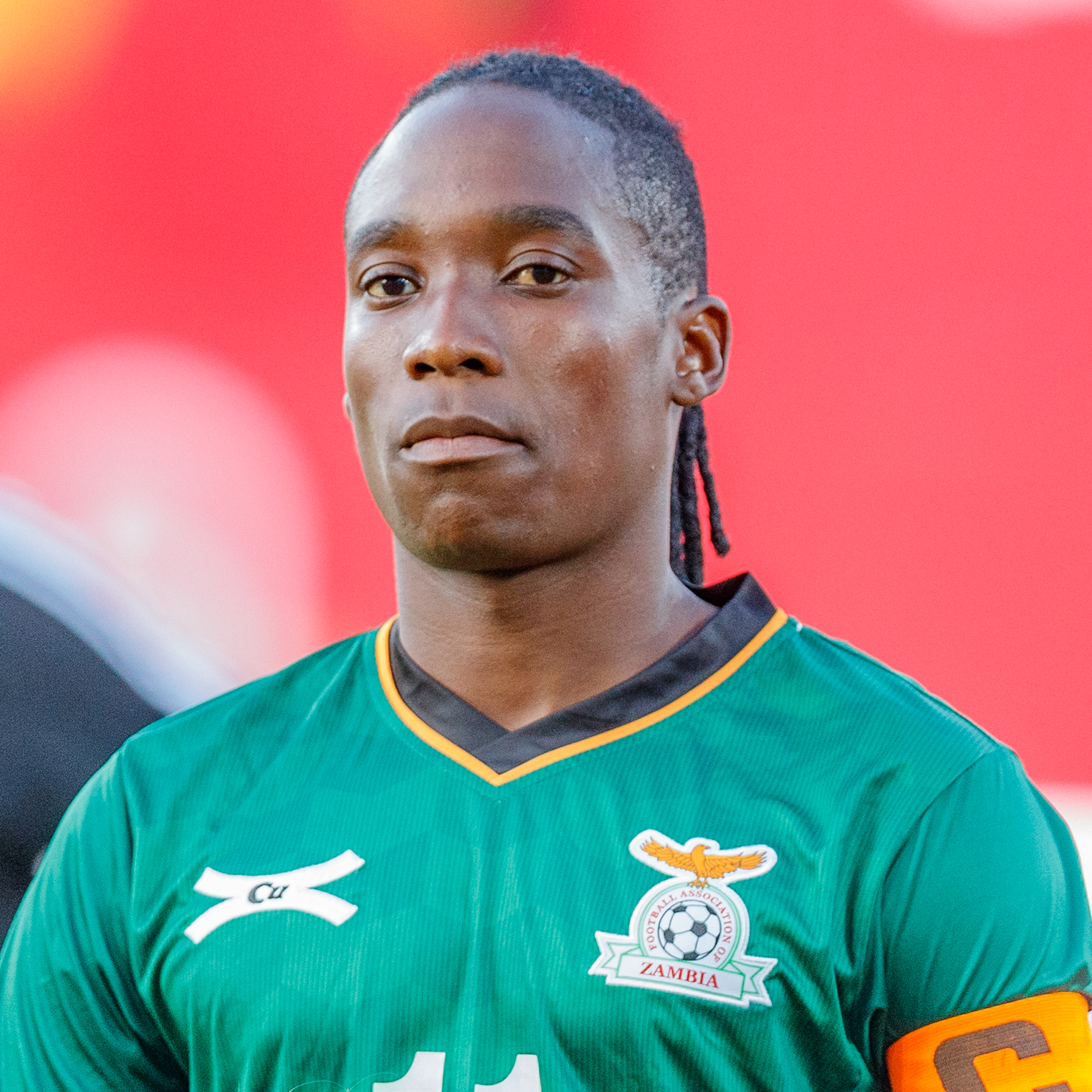
Banda playing for Zambia in 2023; she scored 57 goals in 63 appearances for Zambia

Barbra Banda is a Zambian professional footballer who has been representing the Zambia national team as a striker since her debut in 2016. Since then, Banda has scored 57 goals in 63 international appearances, making her the country's all-time top scorer. Banda made her debut for Zambia on 6 March 2016, two weeks before her 16th birthday, against Namibia where she came on as a substitute in a 3–1 home win in 2016 Women's Africa Cup of Nations.

Banda captained the Zambian squad at the 2020 Olympics in Tokyo, the first time Zambia competed at the international tournament. During the team's first group stage match, Banda scored a hat trick against the Netherlands. The match ended 3–10, the worst ever loss for the Zambia women's national football team and the highest-scoring women's football match in Olympics history. In their second group match, Banda scored another hat trick against China with the match ending in a 4–4 draw. She became the first woman footballer in Olympic history to score back-to-back hat tricks and the first to score two hat tricks in one tournament. She is Africa's all-time top scorer in Olympic history.

== Goals ==
Scores and results list her team's goal tally first, score column indicates score after each Banda goal. Every international goal scored by Banda was for Zambia.

International goals by date, venue, opponent, score, result and competition
No.	Date	Venue	Opponent	Score	Result	Competition
1	13 September 2017	Barbourfields Stadium, Bulawayo, Zimbabwe	Malawi	3–1	6–3	2017 COSAFA Women's Championship
2	15 September 2017	Barbourfields Stadium, Bulawayo, Zimbabwe	Zimbabwe	1–0	1–1	2017 COSAFA Women's Championship
3	17 September 2017	Barbourfields Stadium, Bulawayo, Zimbabwe	Madagascar	2–0	2–1	2017 COSAFA Women's Championship
4	17 September 2017	Barbourfields Stadium, Bulawayo, Zimbabwe	Madagascar	2–1	2–1	2017 COSAFA Women's Championship
5	21 September 2017	Barbourfields Stadium, Bulawayo, Zimbabwe	South Africa	1–0	3–3	2017 COSAFA Women's Championship
6	23 September 2017	Barbourfields Stadium, Bulawayo, Zimbabwe	Kenya	1–1	1–1	2017 COSAFA Women's Championship
7	4 April 2018	National Stadium, Dar es Salaam, Tanzania	Tanzania	1–2	3–3	2018 Africa Women Cup of Nations qualification
8	4 April 2018	National Stadium, Dar es Salaam, Tanzania	Tanzania	3–3	3–3	2018 Africa Women Cup of Nations qualification
9	10 June 2018	Rufaro Stadium, Harare, Zimbabwe	Zimbabwe	2–1	2–1	2018 Africa Women Cup of Nations qualification
10	13 September 2018	Wolfson Stadium, Ibhayi, South Africa	Lesotho	2–0	2–0	2018 COSAFA Women's Championship
11	18 September 2018	Wolfson Stadium, Ibhayi, South Africa	Mozambique	3–0	3–0	2018 COSAFA Women's Championship
12	4 November 2020	Wolfson Stadium, Ibhayi, South Africa	Lesotho	1–0	8–0	2018 COSAFA Women's Championship
13	4 November 2020	Wolfson Stadium, Ibhayi, South Africa	Lesotho	2–0	8–0	2018 COSAFA Women's Championship
14	4 November 2020	Wolfson Stadium, Ibhayi, South Africa	Lesotho	6–0	8–0	2018 COSAFA Women's Championship
15	28 November 2020	Estadio San Carlos de Apoquindo, Santiago, Chile	Chile	1–1	2–1	Friendly
16	10 April 2021	Bidvest Stadium, Johannesburg, South Africa	South Africa	1–0	1–3	Friendly
17	21 July 2021	Miyagi Stadium, Rifu, Japan	Netherlands	1–3	3–10	2020 Summer Olympics
18	21 July 2021	Miyagi Stadium, Rifu, Japan	Netherlands	2–10	3–10	2020 Summer Olympics
19	21 July 2021	Miyagi Stadium, Rifu, Japan	Netherlands	3–10	3–10	2020 Summer Olympics
20	24 July 2021	Miyagi Stadium, Rifu, Japan	China	1–1	4–4	2020 Summer Olympics
21	24 July 2021	Miyagi Stadium, Rifu, Japan	China	3–3	4–4	2020 Summer Olympics
22	24 July 2021	Miyagi Stadium, Rifu, Japan	China	4–3	4–4	2020 Summer Olympics
23	11 February 2022	Nkoloma Stadium, Lusaka, Zambia	South Africa	1–0	3–0	Friendly
24	11 February 2022	Nkoloma Stadium, Lusaka, Zambia	South Africa	3–0	3–0	Friendly
25	1 September 2022	Nelson Mandela Bay Stadium, Gqeberha, South Africa	Namibia	1–0	2–0	2022 COSAFA Women's Championship
26	1 September 2022	Nelson Mandela Bay Stadium, Gqeberha, South Africa	Namibia	2–0	2–0	2022 COSAFA Women's Championship
27	4 September 2022	NMU Stadium, Gqeberha, South Africa	Lesotho	1–0	7–0	2022 COSAFA Women's Championship
28	4 September 2022	NMU Stadium, Gqeberha, South Africa	Lesotho	2–0	7–0	2022 COSAFA Women's Championship
29	4 September 2022	NMU Stadium, Gqeberha, South Africa	Lesotho	4–0	7–0	2022 COSAFA Women's Championship
30	4 September 2022	NMU Stadium, Gqeberha, South Africa	Lesotho	5–0	7–0	2022 COSAFA Women's Championship
31	4 September 2022	NMU Stadium, Gqeberha, South Africa	Lesotho	6–0	7–0	2022 COSAFA Women's Championship
32	6 September 2022	Wolfson Stadium, Gqeberha, South Africa	Eswatini	2–0	2–0	2022 COSAFA Women's Championship
33	9 September 2022	Wolfson Stadium, Gqeberha, South Africa	Tanzania	1–0	2–1	2022 COSAFA Women's Championship
34	11 September 2022	Nelson Mandela Bay Stadium, Gqeberha, South Africa	South Africa	1–0	1–0 (a.e.t.)	2022 COSAFA Women's Championship
35	21 February 2023	Miracle Sports Complex, Alanya, Turkey	Uzbekistan	4–0	4–0	2023 Turkish Women's Cup
36	7 April 2023	Suwon World Cup Stadium, Suwon, South Korea	South Korea	2–1	2–5	Friendly
37	30 June 2023	Tissot Arena, Biel/Bienne, Switzerland	Switzerland	2–1	3–3	Friendly
38	7 July 2023	Sportpark Ronhof Thomas Sommer, Fürth, Germany	Germany	1–0	3–2	Friendly
39	7 July 2023	Sportpark Ronhof Thomas Sommer, Fürth, Germany	Germany	3–2	3–2	Friendly
40	31 July 2023	Waikato Stadium, Hamilton, New Zealand	Costa Rica	2–0	3–1	2023 FIFA Women's World Cup
41	22 September 2023	Père Jégo Stadium, Casablanca, Morocco	Morocco	1–0	2–0	Friendly
42	22 September 2023	Père Jégo Stadium, Casablanca, Morocco	Morocco	2–0	2–0	Friendly
43	26 September 2023	Moulay Hassan Stadium, Rabat, Morocco	Morocco	3–1	6–2	Friendly
44	26 September 2023	Moulay Hassan Stadium, Rabat, Morocco	Morocco	4–1	6–2	Friendly
45	26 September 2023	Moulay Hassan Stadium, Rabat, Morocco	Morocco	5–1	6–2	Friendly
46	29 November 2023	Estádio 22 de Junho, Luanda, Angola	Angola	2–0	6–0	2024 Women's Africa Cup of Nations qualification
47	29 November 2023	Estádio 22 de Junho, Luanda, Angola	Angola	3–0	6–0	2024 Women's Africa Cup of Nations qualification
48	29 November 2023	Estádio 22 de Junho, Luanda, Angola	Angola	5–0	6–0	2024 Women's Africa Cup of Nations qualification
49	5 December 2023	Levy Mwanawasa Stadium, Ndola, Zambia	Angola	2–0	6–0	2024 Women's Africa Cup of Nations qualification
50	28 February 2024	Levy Mwanawasa Stadium, Ndola, Zambia	Ghana	1–0	3–3	2024 Summer Olympic qualifiers
51	28 February 2024	Levy Mwanawasa Stadium, Ndola, Zambia	Ghana	3–3	3–3	2024 Summer Olympic qualifiers
52	9 April 2024	Moulay Hassan Stadium, Rabat, Morocco	Morocco	1–0	2–0 (a.e.t.)	2024 Summer Olympic qualifiers
53	9 April 2024	Moulay Hassan Stadium, Rabat, Morocco	Morocco	2–0	2–0 (a.e.t.)	2024 Summer Olympic qualifiers
54	28 July 2024	Stade de Nice, Nice, France	Australia	1–0	5–6	2024 Summer Olympics
55	28 July 2024	Stade de Nice, Nice, France	Australia	3–1	5–6	2024 Summer Olympics
56	28 July 2024	Stade de Nice, Nice, France	Australia	4–2	5–6	2024 Summer Olympics
57	31 July 2024	Stade Geoffroy-Guichard, Saint-Étienne, France	Germany	1–2	1–4	2024 Summer Olympics
58	14 April 2026	Arena Pantanal, Cuiabá, Brazil	Brazil	1–2	1–6	2026 FIFA Series
59	18 April 2026	Arena Pantanal, Cuiabá, Brazil	South Korea	1–0	1–1	2026 FIFA Series
60	28 July 2026	Rabat Olympic Stadium, Casablanca, Morocco	Egypt	2–0	6–0	2026 Women's Africa Cup of Nations
61	28 July 2026	Rabat Olympic Stadium, Casablanca, Morocco	Egypt	3–0	6–0	2026 Women's Africa Cup of Nations
62	28 July 2026	Rabat Olympic Stadium, Casablanca, Morocco	Egypt	4–0	6–0	2026 Women's Africa Cup of Nations
63	28 July 2026	Rabat Olympic Stadium, Casablanca, Morocco	Egypt	6–0	6–0	2026 Women's Africa Cup of Nations
64	5 August 2026	Al Medina Stadium, Rabat, Morocco	Malawi	1–0	2−1	2026 Women's Africa Cup of Nations

== Hat-tricks ==
List of international hat-tricks scored by Barbra Banda
No.	Opponent	Goals	Score	Venue	Competition	Date	Ref.
1	Lesotho	3 – (30', 52', 70')	8–0	Wolfson Stadium, Ibhayi, South Africa	2020 COSAFA Women's Championship	4 November 2020	
2	Netherlands	3 – (19', 82', 83')	3–10	Miyagi Stadium, Rifu, Japan	2020 Summer Olympics	21 July 2021	
3	China	3 – (43', 46', 69')	4–4	Miyagi Stadium, Rifu, Japan	2020 Summer Olympics	24 July 2021	
4	Lesotho	5 – (11', 30', 48', 52', 56')	7–0	NMU Stadium, Gqeberha, South Africa	2022 COSAFA Women's Championship	4 September 2022	
5	Morocco	3 – (5', 24', 89')	6–2	Moulay Hassan Stadium, Rabat, Morocco	Friendly	26 September 2023	
6	Angola	3 – (44', 45+2', 64')	6–0	Estádio 22 de Junho, Luanda, Angola	2024 Women's Africa Cup of Nations qualification	29 November 2023	
7	Australia	3 – (1', 33', 45+2)	5–6	Stade de Nice, Nice, France	2024 Summer Olympics	28 July 2024	
8	Egypt	4 – (60', 63', 87', 90+6)	6–0	Rabat Olympic Stadium, Casablanca, Morocco	2026 Women's Africa Cup of Nations	28 July 2026	

== Statistics ==
Goals by competition
Competition	Goals
FIFA World Cup	1
Summer Olympics	10
Summer Olympics qualifiers	4
Africa Cup of Nations	5
Africa Cup of Nations qualification	7
COSAFA Championship	21
Turkish Cup	1
2026 FIFA Series	2
Friendlies	13
Total	64

Goals by opponent
Opponent	Goals
Lesotho	9
Morocco	7
South Africa	5
Angola	4
Egypt	4
Australia	3
China	3
Germany	3
Netherlands	3
Tanzania	3
Ghana	2
Madagascar	2
Malawi	2
Namibia	2
South Korea	2
Zimbabwe	2
Brazil	1
Chile	1
Costa Rica	1
Eswatini	1
Kenya	1
Mozambique	1
Switzerland	1
Uzbekistan	1
Total	64

== See also ==
- List of top international women's football goal scorers by country
