= List of international goals scored by Abby Wambach =

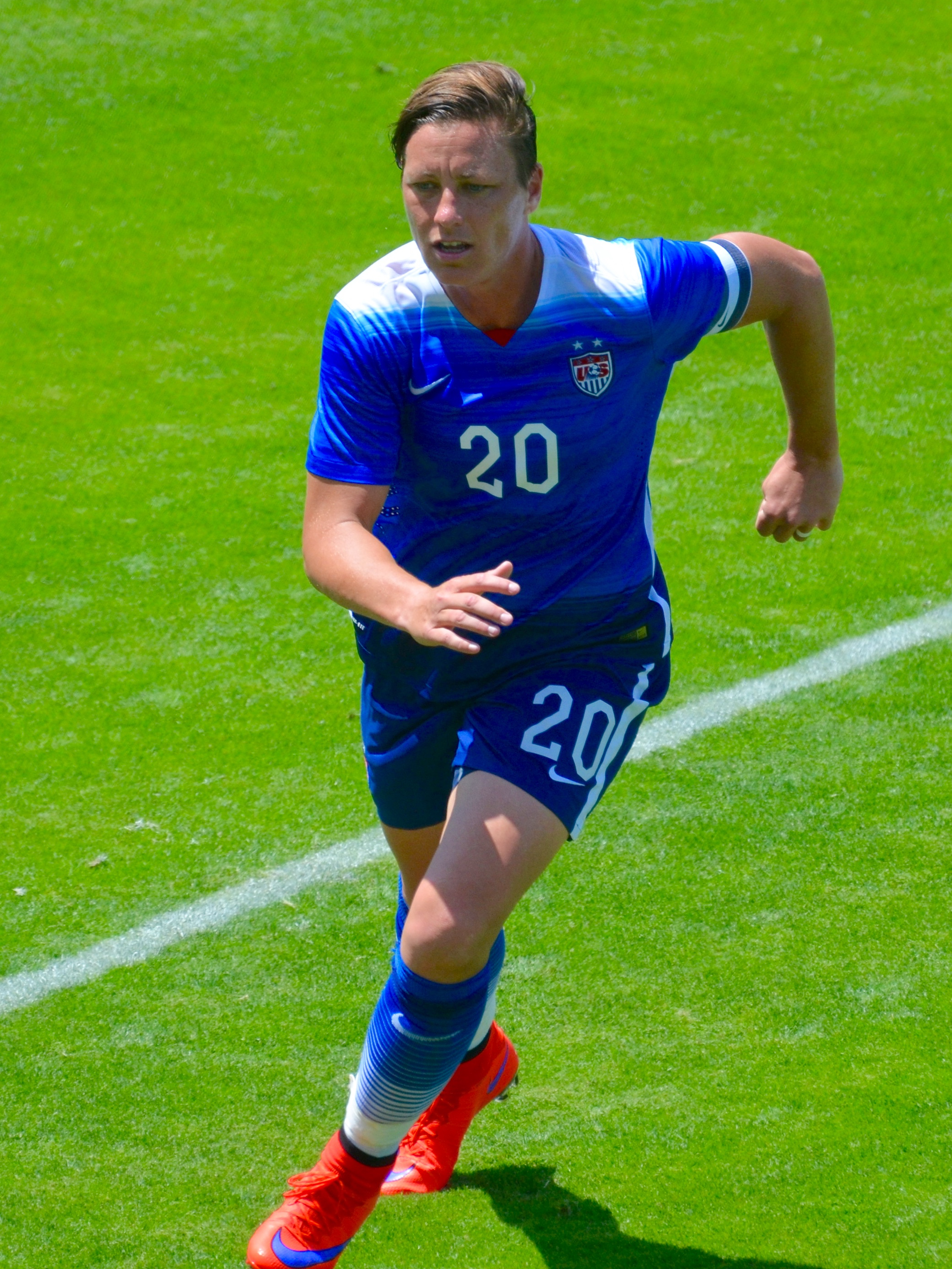
Wambach playing for the United States women's national soccer team in San Jose, California, on May 10, 2015

Abby Wambach is a former professional soccer player who competed as a forward for the United States women's national soccer team from 2001 to 2015. In 255 appearances for the senior national team, she scored 184 goals and is second in the world for goals scored at the international level by both female and male soccer players. The previous record holder was Mia Hamm who scored 158 international goals during her career, also for the United States. Wambach broke Hamm's record on June 20, 2013, as she completed a hat trick against South Korea, in a friendly match at Red Bull Arena in Harrison, New Jersey.

Wambach scored her first international goal in the seventh minute of a friendly against Finland on April 27, 2002, in her second game for the national team. She scored her first international hat trick during a friendly against Scotland leading the national team to an 8–2 win in her fourth appearance for the team. Her first international goal scored during a competitive match occurred on November 2, 2002, during the national team's 9–0 win over Panama in the 2002 CONCACAF Women's Gold Cup. During her first FIFA Women's World Cup tournament, she scored three goals in six games. Wambach completed her international career having scored a total of 14 goals in her 25 World Cup match appearances, placing second on the all-time World Cup scoring list behind Marta.

Known for scoring goals with diving headers, one of her more notable goals occurred in the 122nd minute of the 2011 FIFA Women's World Cup quarterfinal match against Brazil from a last-minute cross from midfielder Megan Rapinoe. Wambach scored the equalizer in stoppage time and the Americans defeated Brazil in a penalty shootout. The team eventually progressed to the World Cup final against Japan. Wambach's last-minute goal set a new record for the latest goal ever scored in a World Cup match and was awarded ESPN's 2011 ESPY Award for Best Play of the Year. Following her performance at the 2011 World Cup, Wambach was awarded the tournament's Bronze Boot and Silver Ball. In 2011, she became the first ever soccer player of any gender to be named Associated Press Athlete of the Year.

== International goals ==
"Score" represents the score in the match after Wambach's goal. "Score" and "Result" list the United States' goal tally first. Cap represents the player's appearance in an international level match.

Goal	Cap	Date	Location	Opponent	Score	Result	Competition	Ref.
1	2	Apr 27, 2002	Spartan Stadium, San Jose, United States	Finland	1–0	3–0 W	Friendly	
2	4	Sep 8, 2002	Columbus Crew Stadium, Columbus, United States	Scotland	3–2	8–2 W	Friendly	
3	4	Sep 8, 2002	Columbus Crew Stadium, Columbus, United States	Scotland	5–2	8–2 W	Friendly	
4	4	Sep 8, 2002	Columbus Crew Stadium, Columbus, United States	Scotland	8–2	8–2 W	Friendly	
5	8	Nov 2, 2002	Safeco Field, Seattle, United States	Panama	9–0	9–0 W	2002 CONCACAF Women's Gold Cup	
6	11	Jun 14, 2003	Rice-Eccles Stadium, Salt Lake City, United States	Iceland	3–0	5–0 W	Friendly	
7	11	Jun 14, 2003	Rice-Eccles Stadium, Salt Lake City, United States	Iceland	4–0	5–0 W	Friendly	
8	13	Sep 1, 2003	Home Depot Center, Carson, United States	Costa Rica	2–0	5–0 W	Friendly	
9	14	Sep 7, 2003	Spartan Stadium, San Jose, United States	Mexico	2–0	5–0 W	Friendly	
10	16	Sep 25, 2003	Lincoln Financial Field, Philadelphia, United States	Nigeria	4–0	5–0 W	2003 FIFA Women's World Cup: Group A	
11	17	Sep 28, 2003	Columbus Crew Stadium, Columbus, United States	Korea DPR	1–0	3–0 W	2003 FIFA Women's World Cup: Group A	
12	18	Oct 1, 2003	Gillette Stadium, Boston, United States	Norway	1–0	1–0 W	2003 FIFA Women's World Cup: Knockout stage	
13	22	Nov 2, 2003	Cotton Bowl, Dallas, United States	Mexico	2–1	3–1 W	Friendly	
14	22	Nov 2, 2003	Cotton Bowl, Dallas, United States	Mexico	3–1	3–1 W	Friendly	
15	26	Feb 25, 2004	Estadio Nacional, San José, Costa Rica	Trinidad	5–0	7–0 W	2004 CONCACAF Women's Pre-Olympic Tournament	
16	27	Feb 27, 2004	Estadio Eladio Rosabal Cordero, Heredia, Costa Rica	Haiti	7–0	8–0 W	2004 CONCACAF Women's Pre-Olympic Tournament	
17	28	Feb 29, 2004	Estadio Nacional, San José, Costa Rica	Mexico	2–0	2–0 W	2004 CONCACAF Women's Pre-Olympic Tournament	
18	29	Mar 3, 2004	Estadio Nacional, San José, Costa Rica	Costa Rica	2–0	4–0 W	2004 CONCACAF Women's Pre-Olympic Tournament	
19	30	Mar 5, 2004	Estadio Eladio Rosabal Cordero, Heredia, Costa Rica	Mexico	2–2	3–2 W	2004 CONCACAF Women's Pre-Olympic Tournament	
20	31	Mar 14, 2004	Estádio Municipal de Ferreiras, Ferreiras, Portugal	France	1–0	5–1 W	2004 Algarve Cup: Group A	
21	34	Mar 20, 2004	Estádio Algarve, Faro, Portugal	Norway	1–0	4–1 W	2004 Algarve Cup: Final	
22	34	Mar 20, 2004	Estádio Algarve, Faro, Portugal	Norway	2–1	4–1 W	2004 Algarve Cup: Final	
23	34	Mar 20, 2004	Estádio Algarve, Faro, Portugal	Norway	4–1	4–1 W	2004 Algarve Cup: Final	
24	35	Apr 24, 2004	Legion Field, Birmingham, United States	Brazil	2–0	5–1 W	Friendly	
25	35	Apr 24, 2004	Legion Field, Birmingham, United States	Brazil	3–0	5–1 W	Friendly	
26	37	Jun 6, 2004	Papa John's Cardinal Stadium, Louisville, United States	Japan	1–1	1–1 D	Friendly	
27	39	Jul 21, 2004	National Sports Center, Blaine, United States	Australia	3–1	3–1 W	Friendly	
28	40	Aug 1, 2004	Rentschler Field, East Hartford, United States	China	3–1	3–1 W	Friendly	
29	41	Aug 11, 2004	Pankritio Stadium, Heraklio, Greece	Greece	2–0	3–0 W	2004 Summer Olympics: Group G	
30	42	Aug 14, 2004	Kaftanzolglio Stadium, Thessaloniki, Greece	Brazil	2–0	2–0 W	2004 Summer Olympics: Group G	
31	43	Aug 20, 2004	Kaftanzolglio Stadium, Thessaloniki, Greece	Japan	2–1	2–1 W	2004 Summer Olympics: Quarter Final	
32	45	Aug 26, 2004	Karaiskaki Stadium, Athens, Greece	Brazil	2–1	2–1 aet W	2004 Summer Olympics: Final	
33	46	Sep 25, 2004	Frontier Field, Rochester, United States	Iceland	1–0	4–3 W	Friendly	
34	46	Sep 25, 2004	Frontier Field, Rochester, United States	Iceland	2–0	4–3 W	Friendly	
35	47	Sep 29, 2004	Heinz Field, Pittsburgh, United States	Iceland	2–0	3–0 W	Friendly	
36	48	Oct 3, 2004	PGE Park, Portland, United States	New Zealand	3–0	5–0 W	Friendly	
37	51	Oct 20, 2004	Soldier Field, Chicago, United States	Ireland	3–0	5–1 W	Friendly	
38	52	Oct 23, 2004	Reliant Stadium, Houston, United States	Ireland	1–0	5–0 W	Friendly	
39	52	Oct 23, 2004	Reliant Stadium, Houston, United States	Ireland	2–0	5–0 W	Friendly	
40	52	Oct 23, 2004	Reliant Stadium, Houston, United States	Ireland	3–0	5–0 W	Friendly	
41	52	Oct 23, 2004	Reliant Stadium, Houston, United States	Ireland	4–0	5–0 W	Friendly	
42	52	Oct 23, 2004	Reliant Stadium, Houston, United States	Ireland	5–0	5–0 W	Friendly	
43	54	Nov 6, 2004	Lincoln Financial Field, Philadelphia, United States	Denmark	1–1	1–3 L	Friendly	
44	55	Dec 8, 2004	The Home Depot Center, Carson, United States	Mexico	2–0	5–0 W	Friendly	
45	55	Dec 8, 2004	The Home Depot Center, Carson, United States	Mexico	3–0	5–0 W	Friendly	
46	57	Mar 11, 2005	Complexo Desportivo Arsenio Catuna, Guia, Portugal	Finland	3–0	3–0 W	2005 Algarve Cup: Group B	
47	58	Mar 13, 2005	Estádio Municipal de Vila Real de Santo Antonio, Santo Antonio, Portugal	Denmark	2–0	4–0 W	2005 Algarve Cup: Group B	
48	63	Oct 23, 2005	Blackbaud Stadium, Charleston, United States	Mexico	2–0	3–0 W	Friendly	
49	63	Oct 23, 2005	Blackbaud Stadium, Charleston, United States	Mexico	3–0	3–0 W	Friendly	
50	64	Jan 18, 2006	Guangdong Olympic Stadium, Guangzhou, China	Norway	3–1	3–1 W	2006 Four Nations Tournament	
51	68	Mar 11, 2006	Estadio Municipal de Quarteira, Quarteira, Portugal	Denmark	1–0	5–0 W	2006 Algarve Cup: Group B	
52	71	May 7, 2006	KKWing Stadium, Kumamoto, Japan	Japan	1–1	3–1 W	Friendly	
53	71	May 7, 2006	KKWing Stadium, Kumamoto, Japan	Japan	2–1	3–1 W	Friendly	
54	71	May 7, 2006	KKWing Stadium, Kumamoto, Japan	Japan	3–1	3–1 W	Friendly	
55	73	Jul 15, 2006	National Sports Center, Blaine, United States	Sweden	1–0	3–2 W	Friendly	
56	74	Jul 23, 2006	Torero Stadium, San Diego, United States	Ireland	3–0	5–0 W	Friendly	
57	75	Jul 30, 2006	SAS Soccer Stadium, Cary, United States	Canada	1–0	2–0 W	Friendly	
58	77	Sep 13, 2006	PAETEC Park, Rochester, United States	Mexico	1–0	3–1 W	Friendly	
59	77	Sep 13, 2006	PAETEC Park, Rochester, United States	Mexico	3–1	3–1 W	Friendly	
60	78	Oct 1, 2006	The Home Depot Center, Carson, United States	Chinese Taipei	2–0	10–0 W	Friendly	
61	78	Oct 1, 2006	The Home Depot Center, Carson, United States	Chinese Taipei	6–0	10–0 W	Friendly	
62	78	Oct 1, 2006	The Home Depot Center, Carson, United States	Chinese Taipei	7–0	10–0 W	Friendly	
63	79	Oct 8, 2006	University of Richmond Stadium, Richmond, United States	Iceland	1–0	2–1 W	Friendly	
64	79	Oct 8, 2006	University of Richmond Stadium, Richmond, United States	Iceland	2–1	2–1 W	Friendly	
65	83	Nov 22, 2006	The Home Depot Center, Carson, United States	Mexico	1–0	2–0 W	2006 CONCACAF Women's Gold Cup: Semifinal	
66	83	Nov 22, 2006	The Home Depot Center, Carson, United States	Mexico	2–0	2–0 W	2006 CONCACAF Women's Gold Cup: Semifinal	
67	87	Mar 12, 2007	Estádio Municipal de Vila Real de Santo Antonio, Santo Antonio, Portugal	Sweden	1–0	3–2 W	2007 Algarve Cup: Group B	
68	87	Mar 12, 2007	Estádio Municipal de Vila Real de Santo Antonio, Santo Antonio, Portugal	Sweden	3–1	3–2 W	2007 Algarve Cup: Group B	
69	89	Apr 14, 2007	Gillette Stadium, Foxborough, United States	Mexico	1–0	5–0 W	Friendly	
70	90	May 12, 2007	Pizza Hut Park, Frisco, United States	Canada	1–0	6–2 W	Friendly	
71	90	May 12, 2007	Pizza Hut Park, Frisco, United States	Canada	5–2	6–2 W	Friendly	
72	91	Jun 16, 2007	Cleveland Browns Stadium, Cleveland, United States	China	1–0	2–0 W	Friendly	
73	91	Jun 16, 2007	Cleveland Browns Stadium, Cleveland, United States	China	2–0	2–0 W	Friendly	
74	92	Jun 23, 2007	Giants Stadium, East Rutherford, United States	Brazil	2–0	2–0 W	Friendly	
75	94	Jul 28, 2007	Spartan Stadium, San Jose, United States	Japan	4–0	4–1 W	Friendly	
76	95	Aug 12, 2007	Soldier Field, Chicago, United States	New Zealand	1–0	6–1 W	Friendly	
77	95	Aug 12, 2007	Soldier Field, Chicago, United States	New Zealand	6–1	6–1 W	Friendly	
78	97	Sep 11, 2007	Chengdu Sports Centre, Chengdu, China	Korea DPR	1–0	2–2 D	2007 FIFA Women's World Cup: Group B	
79	98	Sep 14, 2007	Chengdu Sports Centre, Chengdu, China	Sweden	1–0	2–0 W	2007 FIFA Women's World Cup: Group B	
80	98	Sep 14, 2007	Chengdu Sports Centre, Chengdu, China	Sweden	2–0	2–0 W	2007 FIFA Women's World Cup: Group B	
81	100	Sep 22, 2007	Tianjin Olympic Center Stadium, Tianjin, China	England	1–0	3–0 W	2007 FIFA Women's World Cup: Quarter Final	
82	102	Sep 30, 2007	Shanghai Hongkou Football Stadium, Shanghai, China	Norway	1–0	4–1 W	2007 FIFA Women's World Cup: Third place match	
83	102	Sep 30, 2007	Shanghai Hongkou Football Stadium, Shanghai, China	Norway	2–0	4–1 W	2007 FIFA Women's World Cup: Third place match	
84	103	Oct 13, 2007	Edward Jones Dome, St. Louis, United States	Mexico	2–1	5–1 W	Friendly	
85	103	Oct 13, 2007	Edward Jones Dome, St. Louis, United States	Mexico	4–1	5–1 W	Friendly	
86	104	Oct 17, 2007	Providence Park, Portland, United States	Mexico	2–0	4–0 W	Friendly	
87	109	Mar 5, 2008	Estadio Municipal de Albufeira, Albufeira, Portugal	China	3–0	4–0 W	2008 Algarve Cup: Group B	
88	111	Mar 10, 2008	Estadio Restinga, Alvor, Portugal	Norway	2–0	4–0 W	2008 Algarve Cup: Group B	
89	112	Mar 12, 2008	Estádio Municipal de Vila Real de Santo Antonio, Santo Antonio, Portugal	Denmark	2–1	2–1 W	2008 Algarve Cup: Final	
90	113	Apr 4, 2008	Estadio Olímpico Benito Juárez, Juárez, Mexico	Jamaica	3–0	6–0 W	2008 CONCACAF Women's Pre-Olympic Tournament: Group A	
91	113	Apr 4, 2008	Estadio Olímpico Benito Juárez, Juárez, Mexico	Jamaica	4–0	6–0 W	2008 CONCACAF Women's Pre-Olympic Tournament: Group A	
92	114	Apr 6, 2008	Estadio Olímpico Benito Juárez, Juárez, Mexico	Mexico	2–1	3–1 W	2008 CONCACAF Women's Pre-Olympic Tournament: Group A	
93	117	Apr 27, 2008	WakeMed Soccer Park, Cary, United States	Australia	2–0	3–2 W	Friendly	
94	118	May 3, 2008	Legion Field, Birmingham, United States	Australia	2–1	5–4 W	Friendly	
95	118	May 3, 2008	Legion Field, Birmingham, United States	Australia	4–1	5–4 W	Friendly	
96	120	Jun 15, 2008	Suwon Sports Complex, Suwon, Korea	Australia	2–1	2–1 W	2008 Peace Queen Cup: Group B	
97	122	Jun 19, 2008	Suwon Sports Complex, Suwon, Korea	Italy	1–0	2–0 W	2008 Peace Queen Cup: Group B	
98	122	Jun 19, 2008	Suwon Sports Complex, Suwon, Korea	Italy	2–0	2–0 W	2008 Peace Queen Cup: Group B	
99	124	Jul 2, 2008	Fredrikstad Stadion, Fredrikstad, Norway	Norway	4–0	4–0 W	Friendly	
100	129	Jul 19, 2009	Marina Auto Stadium, Rochester, United States	Canada	1–0	1–0 W	Friendly	
101	131	Oct 29, 2009	Impuls Arena, Augsburg, Germany	Germany	1–0	1–0 W	Friendly	
102	133	Feb 26, 2010	Estádio Municipal de Vila Real de Santo Antonio, Santo Antonio, Portugal	Norway	1–0	2–1 W	2010 Algarve Cup: Group B	
103	134	Mar 1, 2010	Estádio Municipal de Ferreiras, Ferreiras, Portugal	Sweden	2–1	2–0 W	2010 Algarve Cup: Group B	
104	135	Mar 3, 2010	Estadio Algarve, Faro, Portugal	Germany	2–0	3–2 W	2010 Algarve Cup: Final	
105	137	Mar 31, 2010	Rio Tinto Stadium, Sandy, United States	Mexico	1–0	1–0 W	Friendly	
106	138	May 22, 2010	Cleveland Browns Stadium, Cleveland, United States	Germany	1–0	4–0 W	Friendly	
107	138	May 22, 2010	Cleveland Browns Stadium, Cleveland, United States	Germany	4–0	4–0 W	Friendly	
108	140	Jul 17, 2010	Rentschler Field Stadium, East Hartford, United States	Sweden	2–0	3–0 W	Friendly	
109	140	Jul 17, 2010	Rentschler Field Stadium, East Hartford, United States	Sweden	3–0	3–0 W	Friendly	
110	143	Oct 28, 2010	Estadio Quintana Roo, Cancún, Mexico	Haiti	2–0	5–0 W	2010 CONCACAF Women's Gold Cup: Group B	
111	143	Oct 28, 2010	Estadio Quintana Roo, Cancún, Mexico	Haiti	4–0	5–0 W	2010 CONCACAF Women's Gold Cup: Group B	
112	143	Oct 28, 2010	Estadio Quintana Roo, Cancún, Mexico	Haiti	5–0	5–0 W	2010 CONCACAF Women's Gold Cup: Group B	
113	144	Oct 30, 2010	Estadio Quintana Roo, Cancún, Mexico	Guatemala	3–0	9–0 W	2010 CONCACAF Women's Gold Cup: Group B	
114	144	Oct 30, 2010	Estadio Quintana Roo, Cancún, Mexico	Guatemala	4–0	9–0 W	2010 CONCACAF Women's Gold Cup: Group B	
115	145	Nov 1, 2010	Estadio Quintana Roo, Cancún, Mexico	Costa Rica	1–0	4–0 W	2010 CONCACAF Women's Gold Cup: Group B	
116	147	Nov 8, 2010	Estadio Quintana Roo, Cancún, Mexico	Costa Rica	2–0	3–0 W	2010 CONCACAF Women's Gold Cup: Third place match	
117	147	Nov 8, 2010	Estadio Quintana Roo, Cancún, Mexico	Costa Rica	3–0	3–0 W	2010 CONCACAF Women's Gold Cup: Third place match	
118	155	May 14, 2011	Columbus Crew Stadium, Columbus, Ohio, United States	Japan	1–0	2–0 W	Friendly	
119	160	Jul 6, 2011	Women's World Cup Stadium, Wolfsburg, Germany	Sweden	1–2	1–2 L	2011 FIFA Women's World Cup: Group C	
120	161	Jul 10, 2011	Rudolf-Harbig Stadium, Dresden, Germany	Brazil	2–2	2–2 (pso 5–3) (W)	2011 FIFA Women's World Cup: Quarter Final	
121	162	Jul 13, 2011	Borussia-Park, Mönchengladbach, Germany	France	2–1	3–1 W	2011 FIFA Women's World Cup: Semifinal	
122	163	Jul 17, 2011	FIFA Women's World Cup Stadium, Frankfurt, Germany	Japan	2–1	2–2 (pso 1–3) (L)	2011 FIFA Women's World Cup: Final	
123	164	Sep 17, 2011	LIVESTRONG Sporting Park, Kansas City, United States	Canada	1–0	1–1 D	Friendly	
124	165	Sep 22, 2011	JELD-WEN Field, Portland, United States	Canada	1–0	3–0 W	Friendly	
125	165	Sep 22, 2011	JELD-WEN Field, Portland, United States	Canada	2–0	3–0 W	Friendly	
126	167	Jan 20, 2012	BC Place, Vancouver, Canada	Dominican	1–0	14–0 W	2012 CONCACAF Women's Olympic Qualifying Tournament: Group B	
127	167	Jan 20, 2012	BC Place, Vancouver, Canada	Dominican	5–0	14–0 W	2012 CONCACAF Women's Olympic Qualifying Tournament: Group B	
128	168	Jan 22, 2012	BC Place, Vancouver, Canada	Guatemala	1–0	13–0 W	2012 CONCACAF Women's Olympic Qualifying Tournament: Group B	
129	168	Jan 22, 2012	BC Place, Vancouver, Canada	Guatemala	2–0	13–0 W	2012 CONCACAF Women's Olympic Qualifying Tournament: Group B	
130	171	Jan 29, 2012	BC Place, Vancouver, Canada	Canada	2–0	4–0 W	2012 CONCACAF Women's Olympic Qualifying Tournament: Final	
131	171	Jan 29, 2012	BC Place, Vancouver, Canada	Canada	3–0	4–0 W	2012 CONCACAF Women's Olympic Qualifying Tournament: Final	
132	173	Feb 29, 2012	Estadio Municipal de Lagos, Lagos, Portugal	Denmark	2–0	5–0 W	2012 Algarve Cup: Group B	
133	174	Mar 2, 2012	Estadio Municipal de Lagos, Lagos, Portugal	Norway	1–0	2–1 W	2012 Algarve Cup: Group B	
134	176	Mar 7, 2012	Estadio Municipal de Bela Vista, Parchal, Portugal	Sweden	3–0	4–0 W	2012 Algarve Cup: Third place match	
135	179	May 27, 2012	PPL Park, Chester, United States	China	4–1	4–1 W	Friendly	
136	180	Jun 16, 2012	Örjans Vall, Halmstad, Sweden	Sweden	1–0	3–1 W	Volvo Winners Cup	
137	181	Jun 18, 2012	Örjans Vall, Halmstad, Sweden	Japan	2–0	4–1 W	Volvo Winners Cup	
138	181	Jun 18, 2012	Örjans Vall, Halmstad, Sweden	Japan	4–1	4–1 W	Volvo Winners Cup	
139	183	Jul 25, 2012	Hampden Park, Glasgow, Scotland	France	1–2	4–2 W	2012 Summer Olympics: Group G	
140	184	Jul 28, 2012	Hampden Park, Glasgow, Scotland	Colombia	2–0	3–0 W	2012 Summer Olympics: Group G	
141	185	Jul 31, 2012	Old Trafford, Manchester, England	Korea DPR	1–0	1–0 W	2012 Summer Olympics: Group G	
142	186	Aug 3, 2012	St James’ Park, Newcastle, England	New Zealand	1–0	2–0 W	2012 Summer Olympics: Quarter Final	
143	187	Aug 6, 2012	Old Trafford, Manchester, England	Canada	3–3	4–3 aet W	2012 Summer Olympics: Semifinal	
144	189	Sep 1, 2012	Sahlen's Stadium, Rochester, United States	Costa Rica	2–0	8–0 W	Friendly	
145	189	Sep 1, 2012	Sahlen's Stadium, Rochester, United States	Costa Rica	3–0	8–0 W	Friendly	
146	191	Sep 19, 2012	Dick's Sporting Goods Park, Commerce City, United States	Australia	3–2	6–2 W	Friendly	
147	192	Oct 20, 2012	Toyota Park, Bridgeview, United States	Germany	1–0	1–1 D	Friendly	
148	193	Oct 22, 2012	Rentschler Field, East Hartford, United States	Germany	1–0	2–2 D	Friendly	
149	197	Dec 12, 2012	BBVA Compass Stadium, Houston, United States	China	1–0	4–0 W	Friendly	
150	197	Dec 12, 2012	BBVA Compass Stadium, Houston, United States	China	3–0	4–0 W	Friendly	
151	198	Dec 15, 2012	FAU Stadium, Boca Raton, United States	China	1–0	3–1 W	Friendly	
152	198	Dec 15, 2012	FAU Stadium, Boca Raton, United States	China	3–1	3–1 W	Friendly	
153	200	Feb 13, 2013	LP Field, Nashville, United States	Scotland	2–0	3–1 W	Friendly	
154	201	Mar 6, 2013	Estadio Municipal de Albufeira, Albufeira, Portugal	Iceland	3–0	3–0 W	2013 Algarve Cup: Group B	
155	204	Apr 5, 2013	Sparda Bank Hessen Stadium, Offenbach, Germany	Germany	1–0	3–3 D	Friendly	
156	206	Jun 15, 2013	Gillette Stadium, Foxborough, United States	Korea	4–1	4–1 W	Friendly	
157	207	Jun 20, 2013	Red Bull Arena, Harrison, United States	Korea	1–0	5–0 W	Friendly	
158	207	Jun 20, 2013	Red Bull Arena, Harrison, United States	Korea	2–0	5–0 W	Friendly	
159	207	Jun 20, 2013	Red Bull Arena, Harrison, United States	Korea	3–0	5–0 W	Friendly	
160	207	Jun 20, 2013	Red Bull Arena, Harrison, United States	Korea	4–0	5–0 W	Friendly	
161	208	Sep 3, 2013	RFK Stadium, Washington, D.C., United States	Mexico	1–0	7–0 W	Friendly	
162	209	Oct 20, 2013	Alamodome, San Antonio, United States	Australia	3–0	4–0 W	Friendly	
163	212	Nov 10, 2013	Florida Citrus Bowl, Orlando, United States	Brazil	2–0	4–1 W	Friendly	
164	214	Feb 8, 2014	FAU Stadium, Boca Raton, United States	Russia	6–0	7–0 W	Friendly	
165	215	Feb 13, 2014	Georgia Dome, Atlanta, United States	Russia	4–0	8–0 W	Friendly	
166	218	Mar 12, 2014	Estadio Bela Vista, Parchal, Portugal	Korea DPR	1–0	3–0 W	2014 Algarve Cup: Seventh place match	
167	218	Mar 12, 2014	Estadio Bela Vista, Parchal, Portugal	Korea DPR	2–0	3–0 W	2014 Algarve Cup: Seventh place match	
168	222	Aug 20, 2014	WakeMed Soccer Park, Cary, United States	Switzerland	4–1	4–1 W	Friendly	
169	223	Sep 13, 2014	Rio Tinto Stadium, Sandy, United States	Mexico	2–0	8–0 W	Friendly	
170	223	Sep 13, 2014	Rio Tinto Stadium, Sandy, United States	Mexico	4–0	8–0 W	Friendly	
171	225	Oct 15, 2014	Sporting Park, Kansas City, United States	Trinidad	1–0	1–0 W	2014 CONCACAF Women's Championship: Group A	
172	226	Oct 20, 2014	RFK Stadium, Washington, D.C., United States	Haiti	2–0	6–0 W	2014 CONCACAF Women's Championship: Group A	
173	226	Oct 20, 2014	RFK Stadium, Washington, D.C., United States	Haiti	4–0	6–0 W	2014 CONCACAF Women's Championship: Group A	
174	228	Oct 26, 2014	PPL Park, Chester, United States	Costa Rica	1–0	6–0 W	2014 CONCACAF Women's Championship: Final	
175	228	Oct 26, 2014	PPL Park, Chester, United States	Costa Rica	3–0	6–0 W	2014 CONCACAF Women's Championship: Final	
176	228	Oct 26, 2014	PPL Park, Chester, United States	Costa Rica	4–0	6–0 W	2014 CONCACAF Women's Championship: Final	
177	228	Oct 26, 2014	PPL Park, Chester, United States	Costa Rica	5–0	6–0 W	2014 CONCACAF Women's Championship: Final	
178	236	Mar 6, 2015	Estádio Municipal de Vila Real de Santo Antonio, Santo Antonio, Portugal	Switzerland	3–0	3–0 W	2015 Algarve Cup: Group B	
179	240	May 10, 2015	Avaya Stadium, San Jose, United States	Ireland	1–0	3–0 W	Friendly	
180	240	May 10, 2015	Avaya Stadium, San Jose, United States	Ireland	2–0	3–0 W	Friendly	
181	241	May 17, 2015	StubHub Center, Carson, United States	Mexico	3–1	5–1 W	Friendly	
182	241	May 17, 2015	StubHub Center, Carson, United States	Mexico	5–1	5–1 W	Friendly	
183	245	Jun 16, 2015	BC Place, Vancouver, Canada	Nigeria	1–0	1–0 W	2015 FIFA Women's World Cup: Group D	
184	251	Aug 19, 2015	Finley Field, Chattanooga, United States	Costa Rica	3–0	7–2 W	Friendly	

== Statistics ==
Goals by year
Year	Caps	Goals
2001	1	0
2002	7	5
2003	14	9
2004	33	31
2005	8	4
2006	21	17
2007	21	20
2008	22	13
2009	4	2
2010	18	16
2011	17	8
2012	32	27
2013	14	11
2014	20	14
2015	23	7
Total	255	184

Goals by competition
Competition	Goals
FIFA World Cup tournaments	14
CONCACAF Women's Gold Cup / Championship	18
Olympic Games^{1}	24
Algarve Cup	22
Other Tournaments^{2}	6
Friendly	100
Total	184

Notes:
^{1} Olympic Games includes CONCACAF qualifying rounds.
^{2} Other Tournaments includes the Peace Queen Cup and the Volvo Winners Cup.

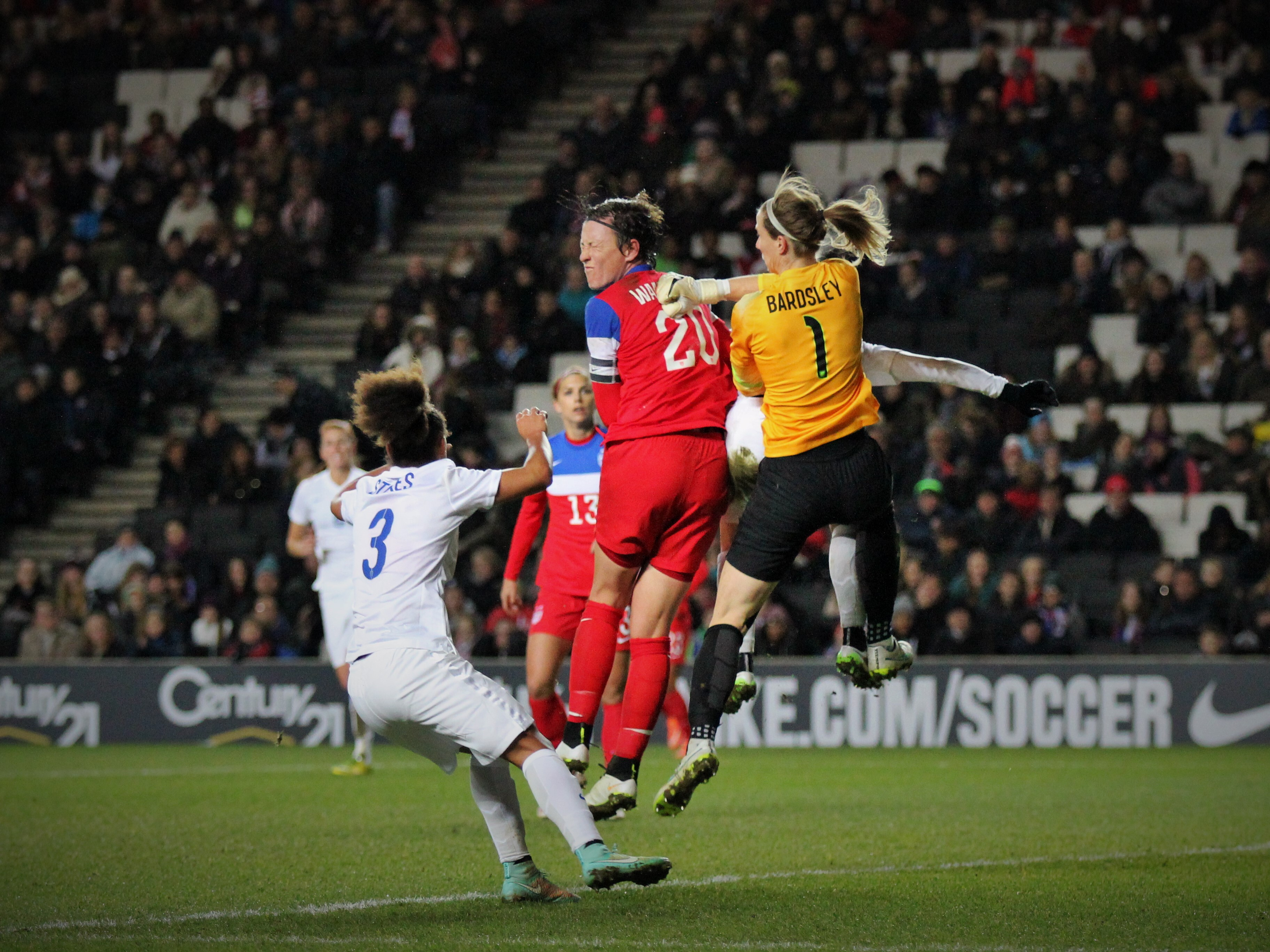
Wambach heads the ball during a match against England, February 2015.

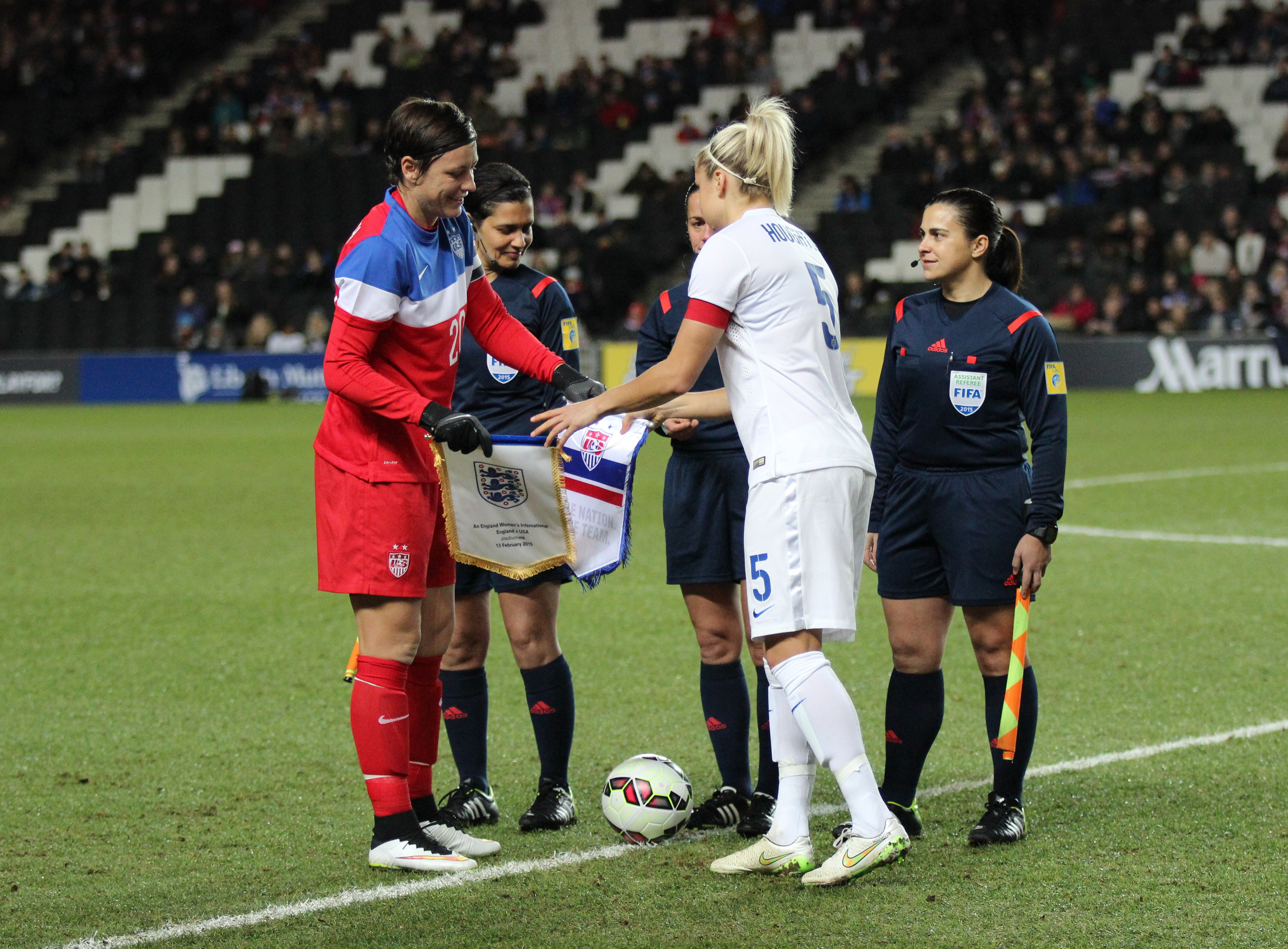
United States captain Wambach shakes hands with England captain Steph Houghton before a match, February 2015.

== See also ==
- List of women's footballers with 100 or more international goals
- List of footballers with 100 or more caps
