= List of women's footballers with 100 or more international goals =

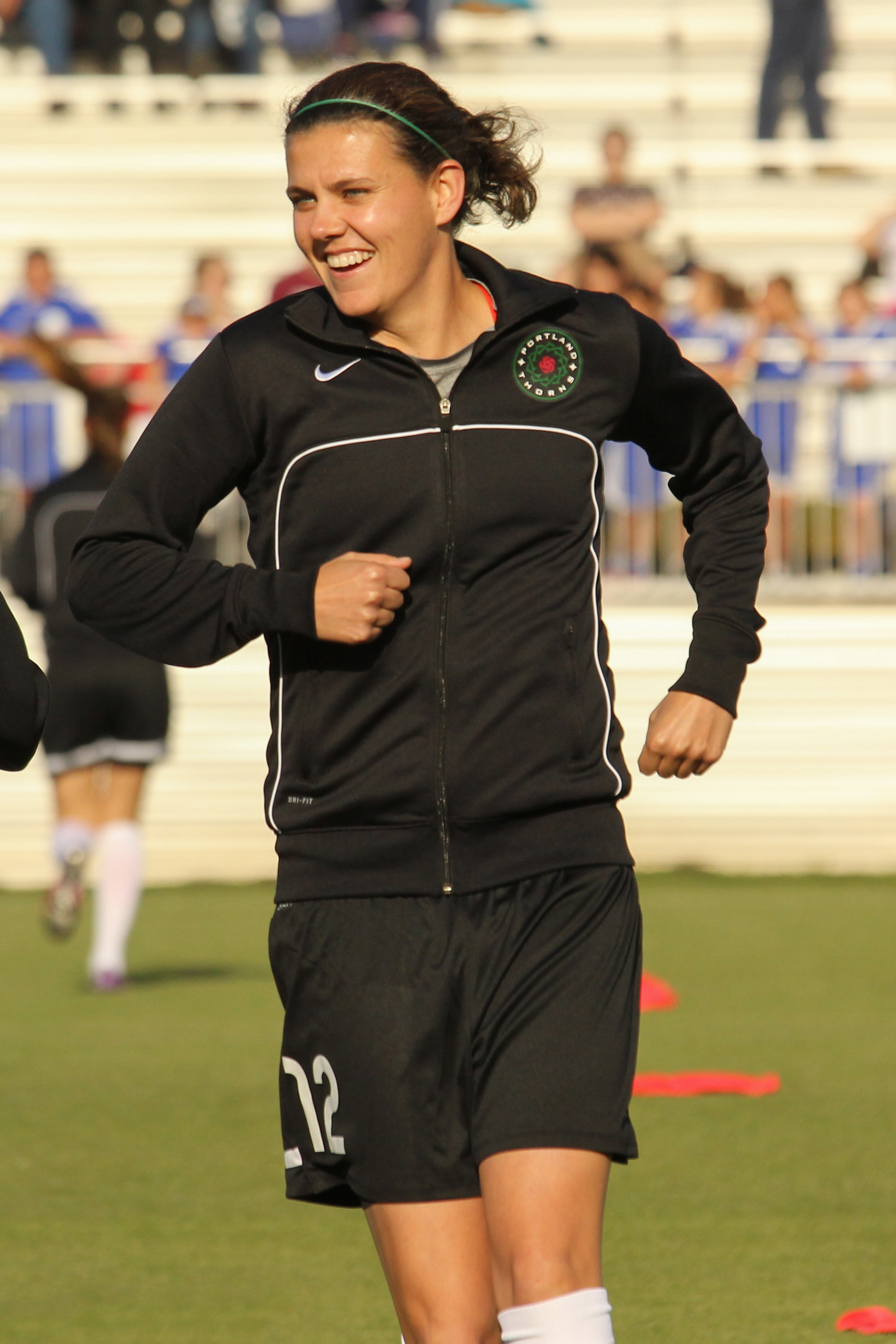
Christine Sinclair holds the all-time record for most international goals (190) among both women and men.

To date, 18 female footballers have scored at least 100 international goals at the senior level. Christine Sinclair of Canada holds the all-time record with 190. The United States leads with seven players who have reached the milestone, followed by Italy with three. CONCACAF has the most players overall, with eight reaching 100 goals.

Elisabetta Vignotto of Italy was the first to reach 100 goals. Mia Hamm, the youngest to do so at 26 years and 185 days, surpassed Vignotto in 1999 with her 108th goal and held the record until 20 June 2013, when Abby Wambach overtook her with 159. Wambach reached 100 goals in nine years; Sinclair did so in just under ten.

== List of players with 100 or more international goals ==
As of 7 March 2026

Players in bold are still active at international level.

Indicates the top scorer of the respective confederation.
Indicates the top scorer of the respective nation.

Rank	Player	Position	Nation	Confederation	Goals	Caps	Goals per match	Career span	Date of 100th goal
1	Christine Sinclair	Forward	Canada	CONCACAF	190	331	0.57	2000–2023	20 February 2010
2	Abby Wambach	Forward	United States	CONCACAF	184	255	0.72	2001–2015	20 July 2009
3	Mia Hamm	Forward, midfielder	United States	CONCACAF	158	276	0.57	1987–2004	18 September 1998
4	**Maysa Jbarah**	Forward	Jordan	AFC	134	140	0.96	2005–present	2 February 2018
5	Carli Lloyd	Midfielder, forward	United States	CONCACAF	134	316	0.42	2005–2021	8 April 2018
6	Kristine Lilly	Forward, midfielder	United States	CONCACAF	130	354	0.37	1987–2010	3 October 2004
7	Birgit Prinz	Forward	Germany	UEFA	128	214	0.6	1994–2011	25 October 2006
8	Alex Morgan	Forward	United States	CONCACAF	123	224	0.55	2010–2024	4 April 2019
9	**Marta** (Note: Only Marta's goals scored in full international matches are counted.)	Forward	Brazil	CONMEBOL	121	200	0.61	2002–present	19 October 2017
10	Julie Fleeting	Forward	Scotland	UEFA	116	118	0.98	1996–2011	27 October 2007
11	Patrizia Panico	Forward	Italy	UEFA	110	204	0.54	1996–2014	10 March 2014
12	Elisabetta Vignotto	Forward	Italy	UEFA	107	109	0.98	1970–1989	unknown
12	Michelle Akers	Midfielder, forward	United States	CONCACAF	107	155	0.69	1985–2000	27 January 1999
14	Carolina Morace	Forward	Italy	UEFA	105	153	0.69	1978–1997	unknown
15	**Vivianne Miedema**	Forward	Netherlands	UEFA	104	132	0.79	2013–present	5 July 2025
16	Portia Modise	Midfielder, forward	South Africa	CAF	101	124	0.81	2000–2015	18 October 2014
16	**Tessa Wullaert**	Forward	Belgium	UEFA	101	154	0.66	2011–present	7 March 2026
18	Tiffeny Milbrett	Forward	United States	CONCACAF	100	206	0.49	1991–2005	10 July 2005

== Number of players with 100 or more goals by country ==
Footballers	Country	Confederation
7	United States	CONCACAF
3	Italy	UEFA
1	Belgium	UEFA
1	Brazil	CONMEBOL
1	Canada	CONCACAF
1	Germany	UEFA
1	Jordan	AFC
1	Netherlands	UEFA
1	Scotland	UEFA
1	South Africa	CAF
18	10	Total

== Number of players with 100 or more goals by confederation ==
Footballers	Countries	Confederation
8	2	CONCACAF
7	5	UEFA
1	1	AFC
1	1	CAF
1	1	CONMEBOL
0	0	OFC
18	10	Total

No OFC player has scored 100 goals in full internationals. The current record holder is New Zealand player Amber Hearn, with 54 goals in 125 matches between 2004 and 2018.

== See also ==
- List of top international women's football goalscorers by country
- List of women's footballers with 100 or more international caps
- List of top international men's football goalscorers by country
- List of men's footballers with 100 or more international caps
- List of women footballers with 500 or more goals
