= Marios Orfanidis =

Cypriot footballer (born 1940)

Personal information
- Date of birth: 16 March 1940 (age 86)

International career
Years	Team	Apps	(Gls)
1965	Cyprus	5	(0)

Marios Orfanidis (born 16 March 1940) is a Cypriot footballer. He played in five matches for the Cyprus national football team in 1965.
