= Katerini Stadium =

Multi-purpose stadium in Katerini, Greece

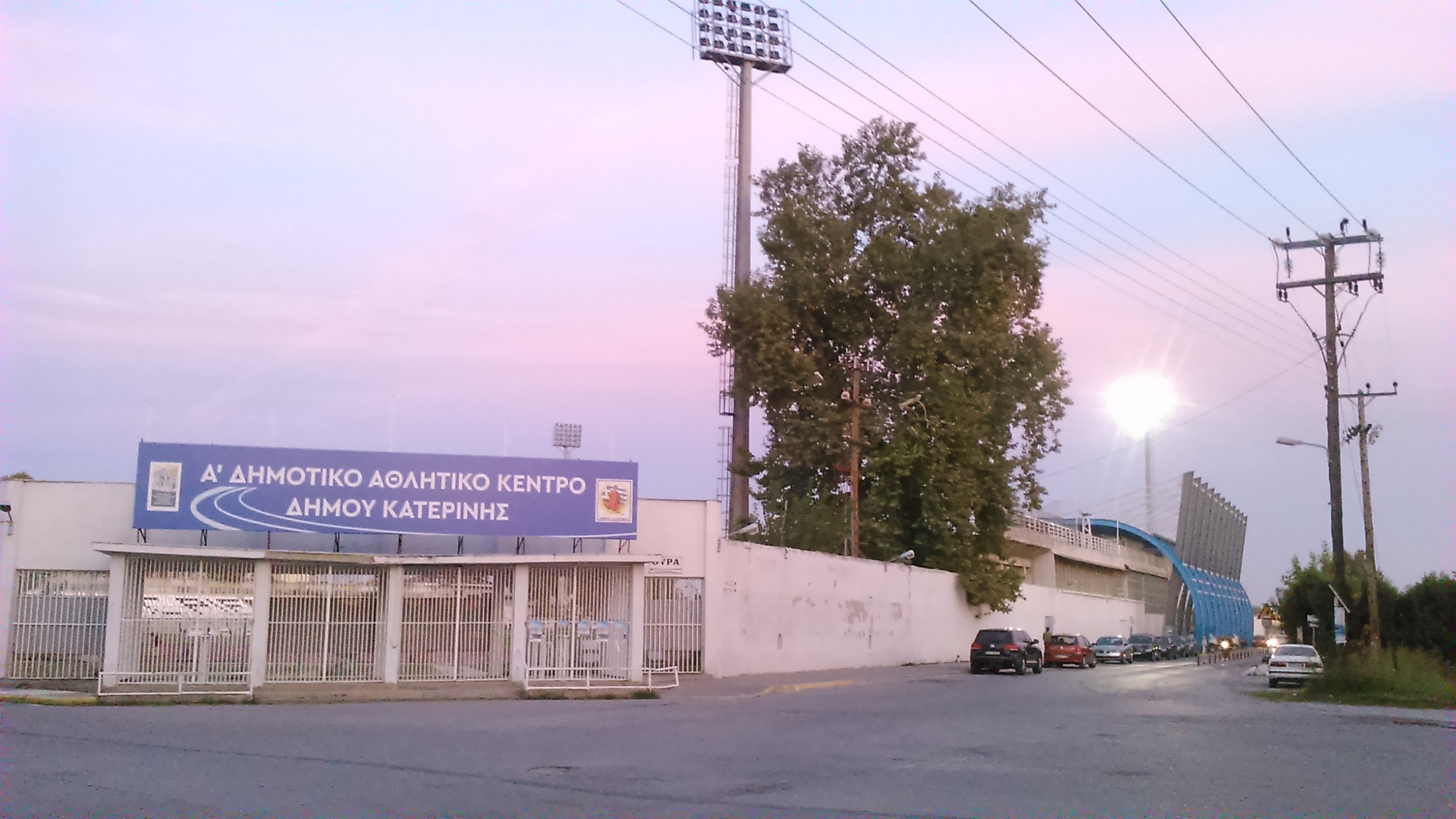
- Interactive map of Katerini Stadium
- Full name: 1st Municipal Athletic Center of Katerini
- Former names: National Stadium of Katerini
- Location: Katerini, Greece
- Coordinates: 40°15′41″N 22°30′43″E
- Owner: Municipality Of Katerini
- Operator: Pierikos
- Capacity: 4.995
- Executive suites: No
- Surface: Grass
- Scoreboard: No
- Record attendance: 12.000; Pierikos - Aris (8/2/1970)
- Field size: 105 x 68 m

Construction
- Groundbreaking: 1961
- Built: 1961 - 1964
- Opened: 1964
- Renovated: 2007, 2009

Tenant
- Pierikos (1964–present)

Katerini Stadium is a multi-purpose stadium in Katerini, Greece. It is used for football matches and is the home stadium of Pierikos. On 19 July 2015 it hosted the final of the 2015 UEFA European Under-19 Championship between Spain and Russia.

The Municipal Stadium of Katerini (or better than the 1st Municipal Athletic Center of Katerini), was originally known as National Stadium of Katerini, before it was renamed. It is located in the District of National Stadium in the city of Katerini. It has a capacity of 4,995 spectators. It has two stands (there are no stands behind the goalposts). The central part of one west stand is covered. It also features light projectors for night matches. There is a tartan, perimetrically, with 8 tracks and other spaces for classic sports.

It is the groundplace of the Pierikos, although it has occasionally hosted other teams such as Vataniakos and Ethnikos Katerini because of the lack of another stadium in Katerini that would qualify for the accusations.

== Renovation ==
From 2007 to 2009, some modernization projects were carried out, with seats being placed in the eastern stand (which meant a reduction of capacity about 700 seats), the installation of headlights and the construction of a shelter. The shelter covers only the central part of the stand, and auxiliary stadiums behind the western pit were also constructed.

Also major reconstructions were made in 2015 for the needs of the 2015 UEFA European Under-19 Championship.

The stadium belonged to the General Secretariat of Sports of the Ministry of Culture and Sports of Greece and was given to the Municipality of Katerini. Since then, the stadium renamed from National Stadium of Katerini to Municipal Athletic Center of Katerini.

== Gallery ==
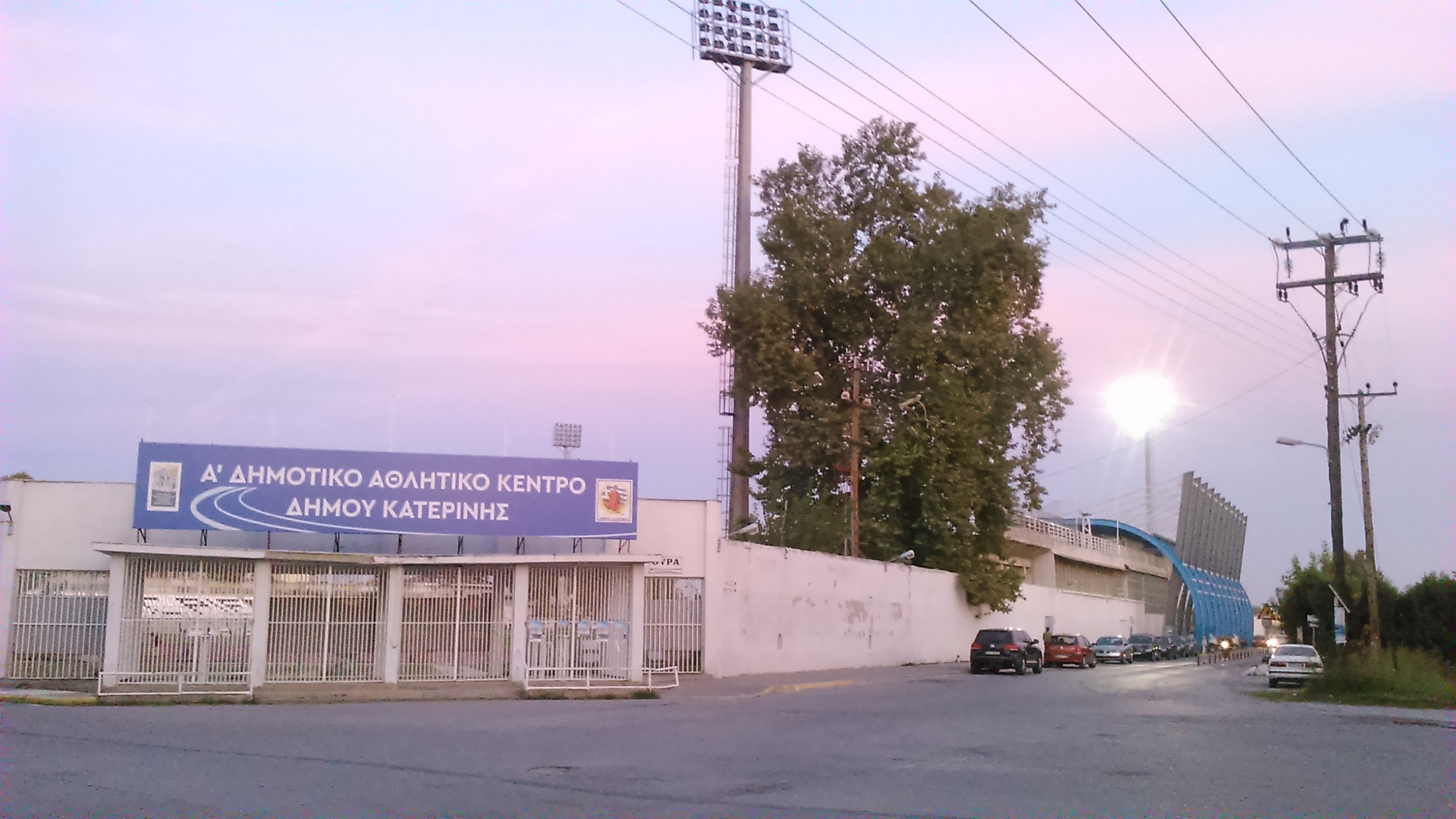
External view

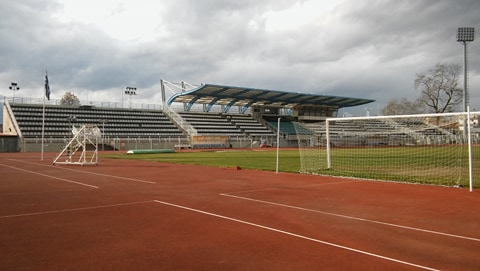
Western stand
