= Petros Orfanidis =

Greek footballer

Petrosss Orfanidis
Personal information
- Date of birth: 23 March 1996 (age 30)
- Place of birth: Xanthi, Greece
- Height: 1.79 m (5 ft 10 in)
- Position: Midfielder

Team information
- Current team: Veria
- Number: 9

Senior career*
Years	Team	Apps	(Gls)
2014–2019	Xanthi	37	(5)
2020	→ Iraklis (loan)	9	(1)
2019–2020	Levadiakos	4	(0)
2020–2021	Kavala	21	(3)
2021–2023	Veria	31	(2)

International career^{‡}
2014–2015	Greece U19	10	(5)
2016–2017	Greece U21	10	(0)
- * Club domestic league appearances and goals as of 5 January 2023 ‡ National team caps and goals as of 02:49, 13 November 2017 (UTC)

Petros Orfanidis (Greek: Πέτρος Ορφανίδης; born 23 March 1996) is a Greek professional footballer who plays as a midfielder for Super League 2 club Veria.

== International career ==
Orfanidis was the central figure in Greece U19's 2–0 opening game win against Ukraine U19, scoring the first goal and creating the second, Orfanidis looks back on the victory with UEFA. In Greece's first finals game since losing to Spain U19 in 2012 decider, Giannis Goumas' charges struck early as Xanthi's playmaker Orfanidis found a way past goalkeeper Vadym Soldatenko.

== Personal life ==
Orfanidis' older brother, Lazaros, is also a professional footballer.

== Honours ==
Xanthi

- Greek Cup Runner-up: 2014–15
