= Lazaros Orfanidis =

Greek footballer (born 1995)

Personal information
- Date of birth: 10 March 1995 (age 31)
- Place of birth: Xanthi, Greece
- Height: 1.80 m (5 ft 11 in)
- Position: Right-back

Team information
- Current team: Anagennisi Thalassia

Youth career
- Xanthi

Senior career*
Years	Team	Apps	(Gls)
2014–2018	Xanthi	3	(0)
2015–2016	→ Zakynthos (loan)	30	(0)
2018	Panserraikos	12	(0)
2018–2019	Aiginiakos	7	(0)
2019	Nestos Chrysoupoli		
2019–2020	Kavala	21	(3)
2020–2025	Anagennisi Thalassia		
2025–2026	Xanthi		
2026–	Anagennisi Thalassia		
- * Club domestic league appearances and goals as of 12 August 2020

Lazaros Orfanidis (Greek: Λάζαρος Ορφανίδης; born 10 March 1995) is a Greek professional footballer who plays as a right-back for Anagennisi Thalassia.

== Personal life ==
Orfanidis' younger brother, Petros, is also a professional footballer.
