= 2016 Women's EuroHockey Indoor Championship II =

2016 Women's EuroHockey Indoor Nations Championship II
Tournament details
- Host country: France
- City: Cambrai
- Dates: 22–24 January 2016
- Teams: 8 (from 1 confederation)

Final positions
- Champions: Russia (2nd title)
- Runner-up: Switzerland
- Third place: France

Tournament statistics
- Matches played: 20
- Goals scored: 132 (6.6 per match)
- Top scorer(s): (Russia) Valeriia Borisova (Switzerland) Karin Bugmann (9 goals)
- Best player: (Russia) Aleksandra Leonova

The 2016 Women's EuroHockey Indoor Nations Championship II was the 11th edition of the tournament. It was held from 22 to 24 January 2018 in Cambrai, France.

Russia won the tournament for the second time after topping the pool. Along with Russia, Switzerland qualified to the 2018 EuroHockey Indoor Nations Championship as the two highest ranked teams.

== Qualified teams ==
The following teams participated in the 2016 EuroHockey Indoor Nations Championship II.

Dates	Event	Location	Quotas	Qualifier(s)
Host			1	France
24–26 January 2014	2014 EuroHockey Indoor Championship	Prague, Czech Republic	1	England
24–26 January 2014	2014 EuroHockey Indoor Championship II	Šiauliai, Lithuania	5	Lithuania; Russia; Scotland; Switzerland; Wales
24–26 January 2014	2014 EuroHockey Indoor Championship III	Poreč, Croatia	1	Croatia
Total			8	

== Results ==
All times are local (UTC+1).

=== Preliminary round ===
==== Pool A ====
Pos	Team	Pld	W	D	L	GF	GA	GD	Pts	Qualification
1	Lithuania	3	2	1	0	15	6	+9	7	Advanced to Pool C
2	Switzerland	3	1	2	0	13	6	+7	5	Advanced to Pool C
3	Croatia	3	1	0	2	6	19	−13	3	Pool D
4	Scotland	3	0	1	2	3	6	−3	1	Pool D

Source: FIH
Rules for classification: 1) points; 2) goal difference; 3) goals scored; 4) head-to-head result.

22 January 2016
11:00

Scotland	1–3	Lithuania
Bunce 17'	Report	Nomeikaite 12', 36'; Juodyte 26'

Umpires:
Pilar López (ESP)
Rachel Williams (ENG)

22 January 2016
12:10

Switzerland	9–2	Croatia
S. Wälti 3', 16'; Bugmann 13', 19', 31', 32', 37', 38', 40'	Report	Peranic 7'; V. Šomin 30'

Umpires:
Karine Alves (FRA)
Xenia Ulrich (AUT)

22 January 2016
17:00

Lithuania	10–3	Croatia
Grubliauskaite 7', 8', 27'; Nomeikaite 10', 38'; Juodyte 12', 13', 24', 36'; Jakovlevaite 40'	Report	Peranic 3', 40'; A. Šomin 35'

Umpires:
Natalia Kadyrova (RUD)
Abby MacArthur (WAL)

22 January 2016
18:10

Switzerland	2–2	Scotland
S. Wälti 21'; Bugmann 39'	Report	Bunce 4'; Costello 19'

Umpires:
Xenia Ulrich (AUT)
Rachel Williams (ENG)

23 January 2016
09:00

Scotland	0–1	Croatia
	Report	Peranic 2'

Umpires:
Inga Jenkova (LTU)
Abby MacArthur (WAL)

23 January 2016
10:10

Lithuania	2–2	Switzerland
Nomeikaite 5'; Juodyte 40'	Report	Von Polier 24'; S. Wälti 32'

Umpires:
Natalia Kadyrova (RUD)
Kerri Targett (SCO)

==== Pool B ====
Pos	Team	Pld	W	D	L	GF	GA	GD	Pts	Qualification
1	Russia	3	3	0	0	15	7	+8	9	Advanced to Pool C
2	France	3	2	0	1	9	8	+1	6	Advanced to Pool C
3	England	3	1	0	2	13	10	+3	3	Pool D
4	Wales	3	0	0	3	4	16	−12	0	Pool D

Source: FIH
Rules for classification: 1) points; 2) goal difference; 3) goals scored; 4) head-to-head result.

22 January 2016
13:20

England	2–6	Russia
Martin 9'; Balsdon 28'	Report	Borisova 1', 15'; Stepanenko 7'; Eroshina 12', 15', 39'

Umpires:
Liz Clifford (IRE)
Abby MacArthur (WAL)

22 January 2016
14:30

France	3–1	Wales
Huvell 9'; Dutel 12'; Billore 29'	Report	Hughes 34'

Umpires:
Inga Jenkova (LTU)
Kerri Targett (SCO)

22 January 2016
19:20

Russia	4–2	Wales
Borisova 6', 34', 36'; Leonova 17'	Report	Webb 9'; Budd 25'

Umpires:
Karine Alves (FRA)
Kerri Targett (SCO)

22 January 2016
20:30

France	3–2	England
Dutel 15', 16'; Begue 26'	Report	Balsdon 23'; Ansley 34'

Umpires:
Pilar López (ESP)
Natalia Kadyrova (RUS)

23 January 2016
11:20

England	9–1	Wales
Balsdon 7', 9'; Gilbert 11'; Wood 24', 26'; Martin 28', 31', 36'; Haycroft 39'	Report	Whiting 17'

Umpires:
Karine Alves (FRA)
Liz Clifford (IRE)

22 January 2016
12:30

Russia	5–3	France
Levashova 5'; Kazakova 12'; Borisova 24', 40'; Eroshina 32'	Report	Begue 7', 39'; Perrocheau 27'

Umpires:
Rachel Williams (ENG)
Xenia Ulrich (AUT)

=== Classification round ===
==== Pool C ====
Pos	Team	Pld	W	D	L	GF	GA	GD	Pts	Promotion
1	Russia	3	3	0	0	14	6	+8	9	Promoted to 2018 Women's EuroHockey Indoor Championship
2	Switzerland	3	1	1	1	9	8	+1	4	Promoted to 2018 Women's EuroHockey Indoor Championship
3	France	3	1	0	2	9	11	−2	3	
4	Lithuania	3	0	1	2	4	11	−7	1	

Source: FIH
Rules for classification: 1) points; 2) goal difference; 3) goals scored; 4) head-to-head result.

23 January 2016
17:5

Switzerland	5–1	France
Bugmann 13'; S. Wälti 17', 39'; T. Trösch 18'; A. Wälti 36'	Report	Billore 24'

Umpires:
Pilar López (ESP)
Rachel Williams (ENG)

23 January 2016
19:15

Lithuania	1–4	Russia
Nomeikaite 10'	Report	Stepanenko 9'; Leonova 13'; Levashova 26'; Eroshina 26'

Umpires:
Karine Alves (FRA)
Xenia Ulrich (AUT)

24 January 2016
12:50

Russia	5–2	Switzerland
Kazakova 12'; Eroshina 15'; Levashova 32'; Borisova 33', 34'	Report	S. Wälti 12', 21'

Umpires:
Abby MacArthur (WAL)
Pilar López (ESP)

24 January 2016
12:50

Lithuania	1–5	France
Juodyte 32'	Report	Perrocheau 23'; Billore 34', 38'; Lansiaux 37'; Dutel 40'

Umpires:
Rachel Williams (ENG)
Kerri Targett (SCO)

==== Pool D ====
Pos	Team	Pld	W	D	L	GF	GA	GD	Pts
1	England	3	2	0	1	15	8	+7	6
2	Scotland	3	2	0	1	11	7	+4	6
3	Croatia	3	2	0	1	8	6	+2	6
4	Wales	3	0	0	3	7	20	−13	0

Source: FIH
Rules for classification: 1) points; 2) goal difference; 3) goals scored; 4) head-to-head result.

23 January 2016
15:30

Scotland	6–3	Wales
Bunce 1', 24'; Costello 8', 16'; Watson 19'; Robertson 28'	Report	Budd 31'; Welsford 31'; Westwood 34'

Umpires:
Liz Clifford (IRE)
Natalia Kadyrova (RUS)

23 January 2016
16:40

Croatia	2–3	England
A. Šomin 1'; Abramovic 20+'	Report	Ansley 17'; Balsdon 32'; Wood 34'

Umpires:
Inga Jenkova (LTU)
Kerri Targett (SCO)

24 January 2016
10:00

England	3–5	Scotland
Martin 6'; Balsdon 9'; Haycroft 15'	Report	Watson 2', 5'; Robertson 18'; Eadie 28'; Bunce 40'

Umpires:
Karine Alves (FRA)
Liz Clifford (IRE)

24 January 2016
11:10

Croatia	5–3	Wales
A. Šomin 5'; Peranic 7', 13'; V. Šomin 16'; Abramovic 33'	Report	Budd 13'; Welsford 20+'; Westwood 29'

Umpires:
Natalia Kadyrova (RUS)
Xenia Ulrich (AUT)

== Awards ==
Player of the Tournament	Top Goalscorers	Goalkeeper of the Tournament
(Russia) Aleksandra Leonova	(Russia) Valeriia Borisova (Russia) Karin Bugmann	(Russia) Viktoriia Aleksandrina

== Statistics ==
=== Final standings ===
As per statistical convention in field hockey, matches decided in extra time are counted as wins and losses, while matches decided by penalty shoot-outs are counted as draws.

Pos	Team	Pld	W	D	L	GF	GA	GD	Pts	Status
1st place, gold medalist(s)	Russia	5	5	0	0	24	10	+14	15	Promoted to 2018 Women's EuroHockey Indoor Championship
2nd place, silver medalist(s)	Switzerland	5	2	2	1	20	12	+8	8	Promoted to 2018 Women's EuroHockey Indoor Championship
3rd place, bronze medalist(s)	France	5	3	0	2	15	14	+1	9	
4	Lithuania	5	2	1	2	17	15	+2	7	
5	England	5	2	0	3	19	17	+2	6	
6	Scotland	5	2	1	2	14	12	+2	7	
7	Croatia	5	2	0	3	13	25	−12	6	
8	Wales	5	0	0	5	10	27	−17	0	

Source: FIH

=== Goalscorers ===
There were 132 goals scored in 20 matches, for an average of 6.6 goals per match.

9 goals

- (Russia) Valeriia Borisova
- (Switzerland) Katrin Bugmann

8 goals

- (Switzerland) Stephanie Wälti

7 goals

- (Lithuania) Jurate Juodyte

6 goals

- (Croatia) Dolores Peranic
- (England) Grace Balsdon
- (Lithuania) Erlanda Nomeikaite
- (Russia) Svetlana Eroshina

5 goals

- (England) Hannah Martin
- (Scotland) Vikki Bunce

4 goals

- (France) Marie Billore
- (France) Gwenaelle Dutel

3 goals

- (Croatia) Anamarija Šomin
- (England) Lucy Wood
- (France) Emilie Begue
- (Lithuania) Simona Grubliauskaite
- (Russia) Antonia Levashova
- (Scotland) Amy Costello
- (Scotland) Charlotte Watson
- (Wales) Katrin Budd

2 goals

- (Croatia) Marina Abramovic
- (Croatia) Viktoria Šomin
- (England) Giselle Ansley
- (England) Sarah Haycroft
- (France) Alix Perrocheau
- (Russia) Iuliia Kazakova
- (Russia) Aleksandra Leonova
- (Russia) Ekaterina Stepanenko
- (Scotland) Katie Robertson
- (Wales) Abi Welsford
- (Wales) Joanne Westwood

1 goal

- (England) Susie Gilbert
- (France) Morgane Huvell
- (France) Astrid Lansiaux
- (Lithuania) Samantha Jakovlevaite
- (Scotland) Jennifer Eadie
- (Switzerland) Tamara Trösch
- (Switzerland) Pia von Polier
- (Switzerland) Alexandra Wälti
- (Wales) Xenna Hughes
- (Wales) Isobel Webb
- (Wales) Julie Whiting

Source: FIH
