= Estadio La Rosaleda =

Stadium at Málaga, Spain

La Rosaleda
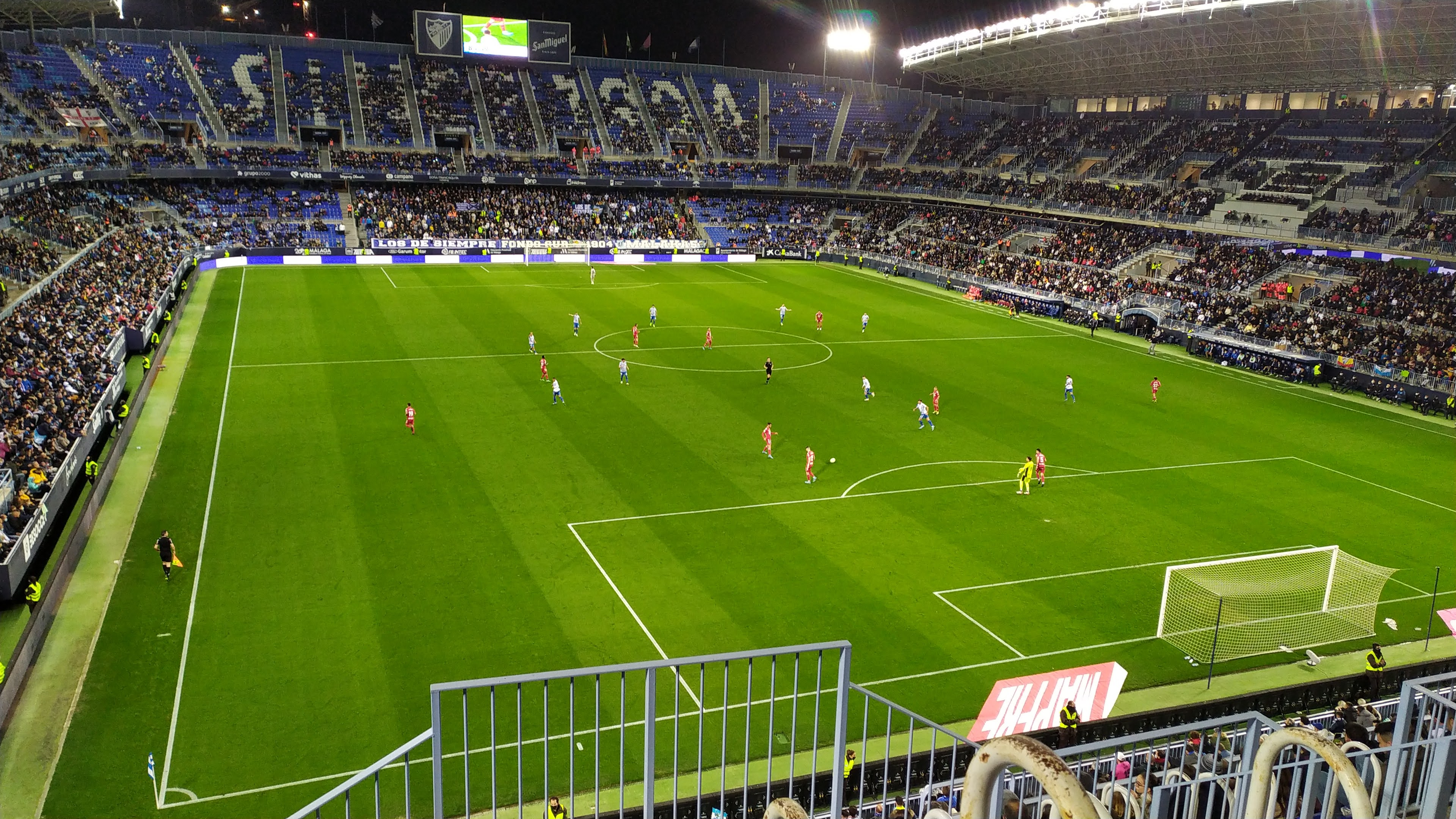
- Interactive map of La Rosaleda
- Full name: Estadio La Rosaleda
- Location: Málaga, Spain
- Coordinates: 36.7342°N 4.4266°W
- Owner: Ayuntamiento de Málaga; Diputación Provincial de Málaga; Junta de Andalucía
- Operator: Málaga CF
- Capacity: 30,778
- Surface: Grass
- Field size: 105 m × 68 m (344 ft × 223 ft)

Construction
- Groundbreaking: 1936
- Opened: 15 September 1941
- Renovated: 1982, 2000, 2010
- Architects: Enrique Atencia; Fernando Guerrero Strachan

Tenants
- Málaga CF (1941–present); Spain national football team (selected matches)

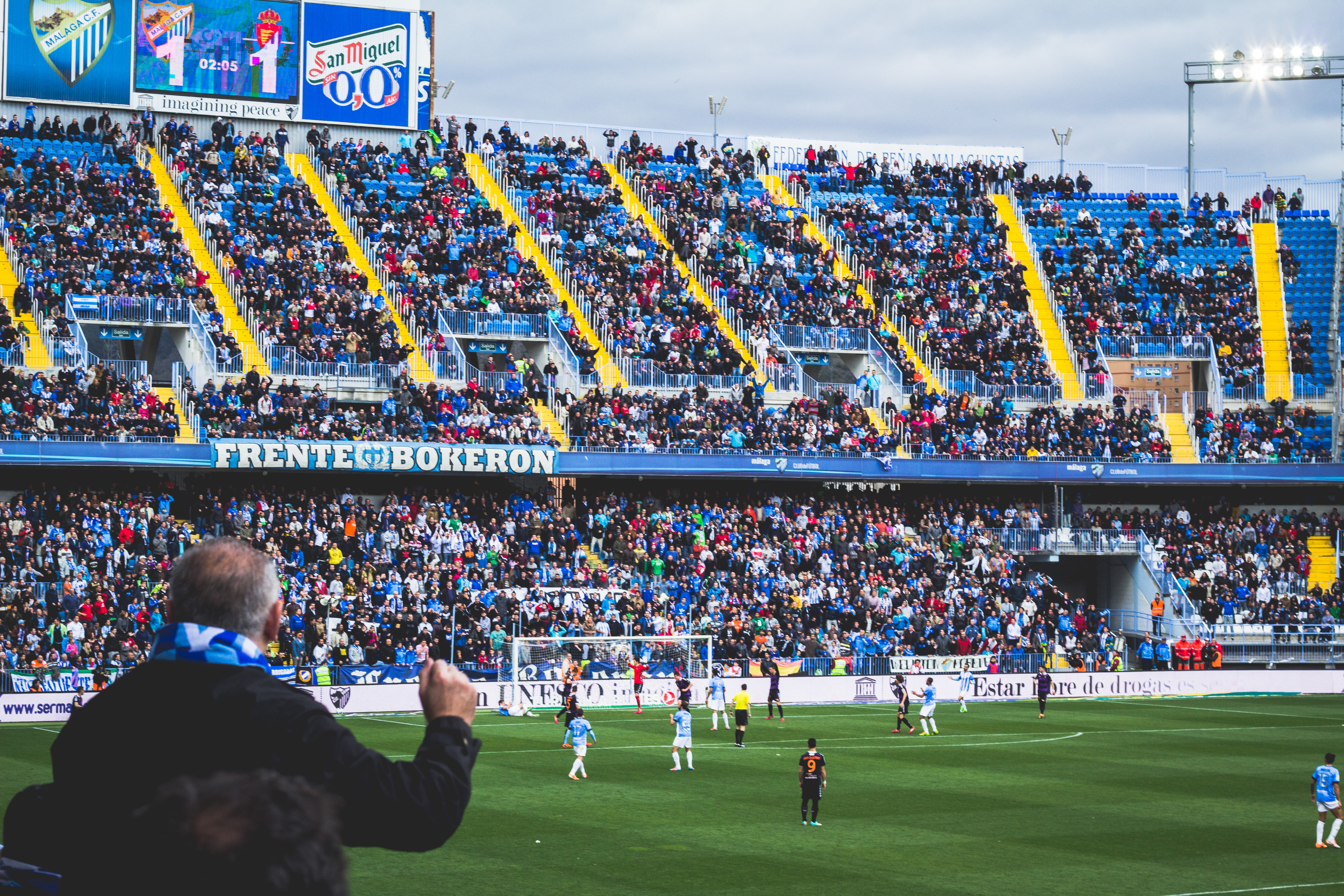
La Rosaleda, 2014

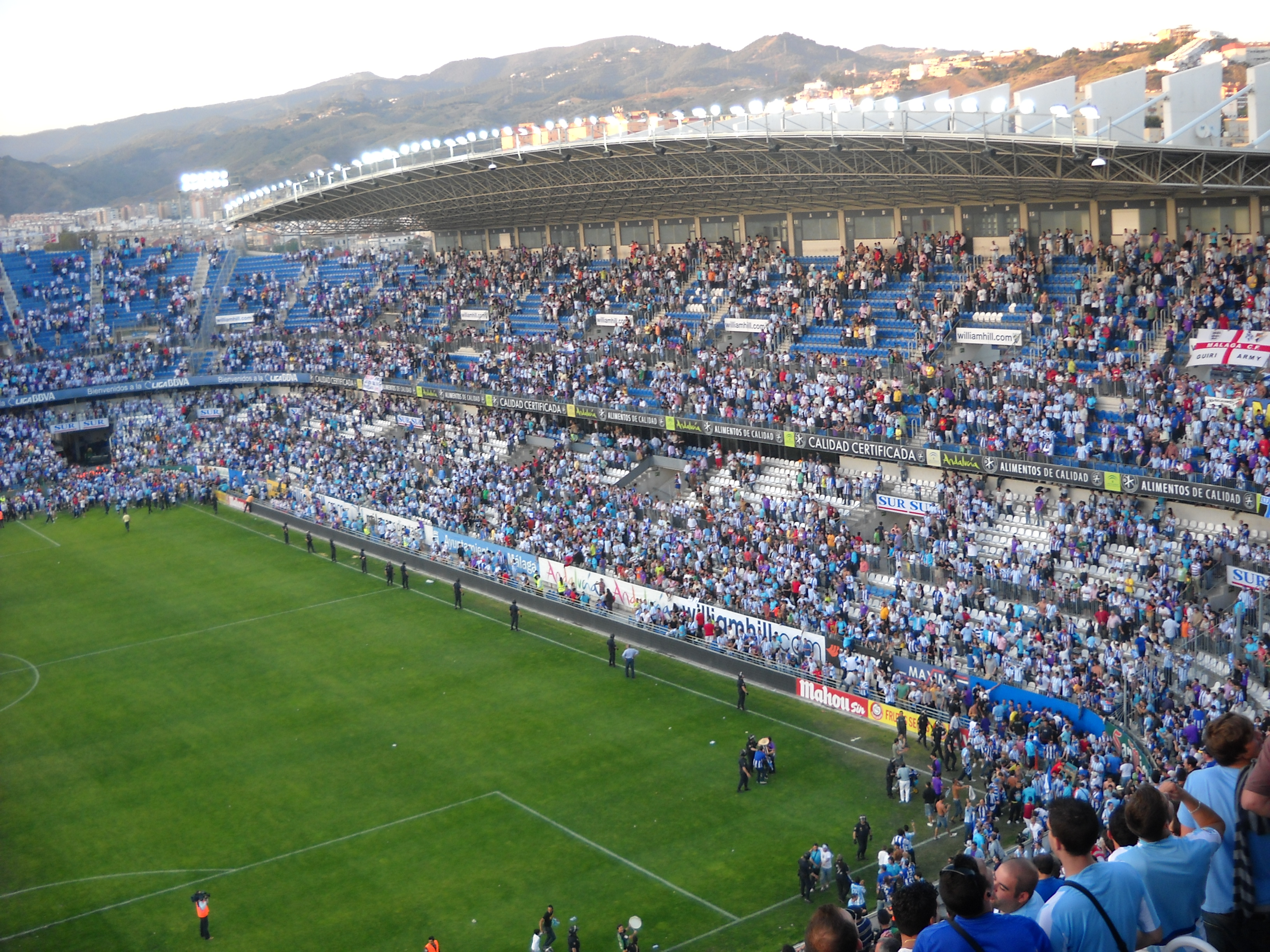
La Rosaleda 2010

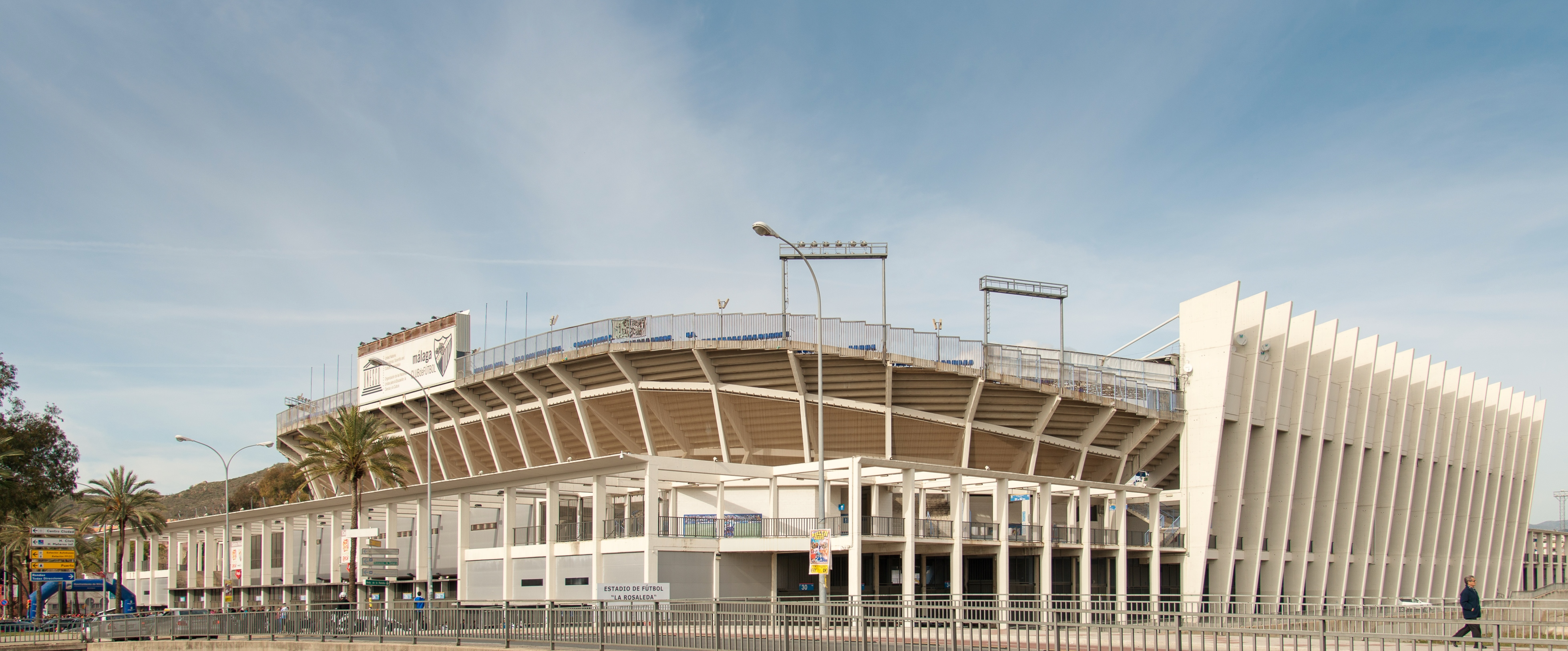
External view of the stadium

Estadio La Rosaleda (Spanish pronunciation: [esˈtaðjo la rosaˈleða]; literally The Rose Garden) is a football stadium in the city of Málaga, in Andalusia, southern Spain. It is the home stadium of Málaga CF in La Liga and was previously that of Club Deportivo Málaga, of which Málaga CF is heir. The subsidiary Atlético Malagueño also used it as a habitual pitch during its time in the second division. The Costa del Sol Trophy Cup, organized annually by Málaga Football Club together with the Municipality of Málaga, is held in this stadium. With a capacity of 30,778 seats, it is the 18th-largest stadium in Spain and the 4th-largest in Andalusia.

The stadium replaced the historic arena of Baños del Carmen. When it flooded, La Rosaleda had to be used for the first time on 13 April 1941 with a fixture between CD Málaga and AD Ferroviaria. The official inauguration took place on 14 September 1941, with a friendly match between CD Málaga and Sevilla. In this match, CD Málaga also premiered its new name, its previous name had been CD Malacitano.

== Notable events ==
Rosaleda Stadium was one of the seventeen host stadiums of the 1982 FIFA World Cup, hosting three matches. Throughout its history, it has also hosted seven matches of the Spain national team and two friendly matches, one of those matches involving the Andalusia national team, as well as "hosting" Norway in its 2022 World Cup qualifier against Turkey, due to travel bans in place then; Turkey won that contest, 3-0.

In 2009, Andalusia became host of the Peace Cup, and Málaga was selected as a host city. La Rosaleda was host to four matches of the 2009 Peace Cup, including the semi-final between Porto and Aston Villa.

In 2020, the stadium was chosen for hosting the women's Copa de la Reina.

It was planned as one of the host cities for the 2030 FIFA World Cup but the bid was withdrawn on 12 July 2025.

== European matches ==
The stadium hosted a game at European level for the first time in 1976 for a knockout stage match in the European Cup between Real Madrid and Club Brugge due to sanctions placed by UEFA on Real Madrid's Santiago Bernabéu Stadium.

In the middle of 2002, it hosted several matches and one of the finals of the UEFA Intertoto Cup, which was awarded to Málaga, which continued to play matches in the 2002–03 season of the UEFA Cup quarter-final until it was eliminated.

=== Charity matches ===
Other events included the celebration of "V Match Against Poverty" in November 2007, which pitted teams from the Friends of Zidane and Friends of Ronaldo. In March 2009 a charity match was played in the stadium which raised 24,000 euros for the benefit of those affected by the tornado of Málaga between the city's football club and a team of former players, active or retired, called "Legends Malagua" and headed by former coach Joaquín Peiró. In June of that year, the Foundation 442 Will Atkinson organized a benefit match between players and former players of the League in order to raise funds for a football school in the city.

The Rosaleda Stadium was one of the headquarters of the Peace Cup in 2009, hosting the matches: Málaga - Aston Villa (1-0), Málaga - CF Atlante (1-3), Aston Villa - CF Atlante (3-1) and Aston Villa - Porto (2-1).

== Concerts ==
The stadium has also seen several concerts as George Michael with 62,000 spectators, Shakira with 59,000 spectators, Maná with 55,000 spectators, Alejandro Sanz with 56,000 spectators, and RBD with 60,000.

== Ownership ==
The stadium is owned by the municipality of Málaga, the Málaga Provincial Council and the Government of Andalusia in equal shares (33.33%), after the CD Málaga be expropriated because of the debt that crossed before her disappearance. The owners, apart from the grant that has the Málaga CF, organize other events in this forum, especially concerts.

== Renovation ==
In 2000, the stadium underwent renovation that was completed in 2006, being reopened with the XXIV edition of the Trofeo Costa del Sol. Completed, the capacity of the stadium is 30,044 all seated locations, paths visors on the steps of Grandstand and Preference, closed circuit television, private boxes, press boxes, outings to area Guadalmedina river and other amenities that the stadium was suing to conform to safety regulations of the LFP. The renovation project was conducted by the architect José Segui Pérez and Sando-Vera joint venture. Plans for a redevelopment of the stadium were shelved in June 2026 after it was decided that a new 55,000 seat stadium would be built at a different site near the University of Málaga by 2032.

== Sporting activities ==
The stadium facilities include the Rosaleda Official Store Málaga CF and a medical center clinic belonging to Corner. Meanwhile, the club works for a future installation of a museum of history.

== 1982 FIFA World Cup ==
The stadium was one of the venues of the 1982 FIFA World Cup, and held the following matches:

Date	Team #1	Res.	Team #2	Round	Attendance
15 June 1982	Scotland	5–2	New Zealand	Group 6 (first round)	36,000
19 June 1982	Soviet Union	3–0	New Zealand	Group 6 (first round)	19,000
22 June 1982	Soviet Union	2–2	Scotland	Group 6 (first round)	45,000
