= 2009 Peace Cup =

2009 Copa de la Paz Andalucía

Tournament details
- Host country: Spain
- Dates: 24 July – 2 August
- Teams: 12 (from 4 confederations)
- Venues: 6 (in 5 host cities)

Final positions
- Champions: (England) Aston Villa (1st title)

Tournament statistics
- Matches played: 15
- Goals scored: 37 (2.47 per match)
- Top scorer(s): Hulk (Porto, 3 goals)
- Best player(s): Ashley Young (Aston Villa)

The 2009 Peace Cup Andalucia was an invitational friendly football tournament. It was the fourth edition of Peace Cup and was held in Spain from 24 July to 2 August in the cities of Madrid, Seville, Málaga, Jerez and Huelva. It was the first time that the tournament has been hosted by a nation other than South Korea. The winners of the tournament were Aston Villa, who defeated Juventus in the final. They succeeded Lyon, who were the previous holders of the tournament through winning the 2007 edition. It was one of seven 2009 pre-season friendly tournaments, the others being the Emirates Cup, the Barclays Asia Trophy, the World Football Challenge, the Wembley Cup, the Amsterdam Tournament and the Audi Cup.

Several players scored their first goals for new clubs in the 2009 Peace Cup competition, though these goals do not impact their regular season statistics. These players included Cristiano Ronaldo scoring his first goal for Real Madrid, Diego scored his first goal for Juventus in the Peace Cup, and Marc Albrighton scored his first goal for Aston Villa in the Peace Cup. Aston Villa's Stiliyan Petrov suffered a dislocated shoulder in the competition's group stages that forced him to miss significant time with injury.

== Teams ==
The following 12 teams confirmed to play in the tournament.

Team	League
(Spain) Málaga	2009–10 La Liga
(Spain) Real Madrid	2009–10 La Liga
(Spain) Sevilla	2009–10 La Liga
(Saudi Arabia) Al-Ittihad	2009–10 Saudi Professional League
(England) Aston Villa	2009–10 Premier League
(Mexico) Atlante	2009–10 Primera División de México
(Turkey) Beşiktaş	2009–10 Süper Lig
(Italy) Juventus	2009–10 Serie A
(Ecuador) LDU Quito	2009 Campeonato Ecuatoriano de Fútbol Serie A
(France) Lyon	2009–10 Ligue 1
(Portugal) Porto	2009–10 Primeira Liga
(South Korea) Seongnam Ilhwa Chunma	2009 K League

== Venues ==
After the previous three tournaments were held in South Korea, the Peace Cup Committee decided that the tournament would be hosted by another country. In 2007, the Peace Cup organizers were connected with Sports Ministry of Andalucia and Andalucia Football Federation, after the discussion with the Autonomous Community of Andalucia, they suggested the cities of Seville, Málaga, Huelva and Jerez to host the 2009 Peace Cup.

On 19 December 2007, it was announced in a press conference in Seville that the number of teams would be increased to 12. It was also confirmed that Real Madrid and Sevilla would be playing in the tournament. The Peace Cup committee continued to negotiate with other "big" clubs, by 13 April 2009, eight more participating clubs such as Juventus, Málaga, Lyon, Aston Villa, Celtic, Porto, Fenerbahçe and LDU Quito, were announced. Celtic and Fenerbahçe, however, were forced to pull out due to conflicts with UEFA Champions League qualifying ties; they were replaced by Atlante and Beşiktaş, respectively.

The official venue for the tournament was Andalucia, however some matches were played in Madrid.

Seville	Seville	Málaga
Ramón Sánchez Pizjuán	Estadio de la Cartuja	La Rosaleda
Capacity: 42,649	Capacity: 57,619	Capacity: 28,963
Jerez	Huelva	Madrid
Chapín	Estadio Nuevo Colombino	Santiago Bernabéu
Capacity: 20,300	Capacity: 21,670	Capacity: 80,354

== Prize money ==
The champions and the runners-up received trophies as well as the corresponding cash prizes.

- Champions: €2,000,000
- Runners-up: €1,000,000
- Third and Fourth places: €500,000

== Group stage ==
The 12 teams were divided into four groups of three teams. Each team played two matches in the group stage, and each group winners qualified to the knockout stage. The draw for the 2009 Peace Cup was staged in Seville on 16 April 2009.

=== Group A ===
Team	Pld	W	D	L	GF	GA	GD	Pts	Qualification
(Italy) Juventus	2	2	0	0	5	1	+4	6	Advance to the semi-finals
(Spain) Sevilla	2	0	1	1	1	2	−1	1	
(South Korea) Seongnam Ilhwa Chunma	2	0	1	1	0	3	−3	1	

24 July 2009
22:30 CEST (UTC+2)

Sevilla (Spain)	1–2	(Italy) Juventus
Squillaci 81'	Report	Amauri 26'; Iaquinta 64'

La Cartuja, Seville
Attendance: 15,000
Referee: Stefan Johannesson (Sweden)

26 July 2009
20:30 CEST (UTC+2)

Sevilla (Spain)	0–0	(South Korea) Seongnam Ilhwa Chunma
	Report

Ramón Sánchez Pizjuán, Seville
Attendance: 2,000
Referee: Alon Yefet (Israel)

28 July 2009
20:30 CEST (UTC+2)

Juventus (Italy)	3–0	(South Korea) Seongnam Ilhwa Chunma
Iaquinta 40'; Diego 52'; Legrottaglie 70'	Report

Chapín, Jerez
Attendance: 1,000
Referee: Manuel Mejuto González (Spain)

=== Group B ===
Team	Pld	W	D	L	GF	GA	GD	Pts	Qualification
(Spain) Real Madrid	2	1	1	0	5	3	+2	4	Advance to the semi-finals
(Ecuador) LDU Quito	2	1	0	1	5	5	0	3	
(Saudi Arabia) Al-Ittihad	2	0	1	1	2	4	−2	1	

24 July 2009
20:10 CEST (UTC+2)

LDU Quito (Ecuador)	3–1	(Saudi Arabia) Al-Ittihad
Reasco 20'; Ambrosi 42'; Graf 72'	Report	Khariri 74'

Chapín, Jerez
Attendance: 500
Referee: Eduardo Iturralde González (Spain)

26 July 2009
22:30 CEST (UTC+2)

Real Madrid (Spain)	1–1	(Saudi Arabia) Al-Ittihad
Raúl 55'	Report	Aboucherouane 63'

Santiago Bernabéu, Madrid
Attendance: 30,000
Referee: Michael Koukoulakis (Greece)

28 July 2009
22:30 CEST (UTC+2)

Real Madrid (Spain)	4–2	(Ecuador) LDU Quito
Ronaldo 48' (pen.); Granero 52'; Metzelder 71'; Negredo 90+2'	Report	E. Vera 68', 86'

Santiago Bernabéu, Madrid
Attendance: 45,000
Referee: Kevin Blom (Netherlands)

=== Group C ===
Team	Pld	W	D	L	GF	GA	GD	Pts	Qualification
(England) Aston Villa	2	1	0	1	3	2	+1	3	Advance to the semi-finals
(Mexico) Atlante	2	1	0	1	4	4	0	3	
(Spain) Málaga	2	1	0	1	2	3	−1	3	

25 July 2009
22:30 CEST (UTC+2)

Málaga (Spain)	1–0	(England) Aston Villa
Fernando 79'	Report

La Rosaleda, Málaga
Attendance: 4,000
Referee: Kevin Blom (Netherlands)

27 July 2009
20:30 CEST (UTC+2)

Málaga (Spain)	1–3	(Mexico) Atlante
Luque 24'	Report	Pereyra 16'; Márquez 66'; Bermúdez 72'

La Rosaleda, Málaga
Attendance: 2,000
Referee: Stefan Johannesson (Sweden)

29 July 2009
20:30 CEST (UTC+2)

Aston Villa (England)	3–1	(Mexico) Atlante
Albrighton 38'; Carew 48'; A. Young 62'	Report	Davies 19' (o.g.)

La Rosaleda, Málaga
Attendance: 1,000
Referee: Alon Yefet (Israel)

=== Group D ===
Team	Pld	W	D	L	GF	GA	GD	Pts	Qualification
(Portugal) Porto	2	1	1	0	2	0	+2	4	Advance to the semi-finals
(Turkey) Beşiktaş	2	0	2	0	1	1	0	2	
(France) Lyon	2	0	1	1	1	3	−2	1	

25 July 2009
20:30 CEST (UTC+2)

Lyon (France)	1–1	(Turkey) Beşiktaş
Källström 63'	Report	Nobre 84'

Estadio Nuevo Colombino, Huelva
Attendance: 300
Referee: Manuel Mejuto González (Spain)

27 July 2009
22:30 CEST (UTC+2)

Lyon (France)	0–2	(Portugal) Porto
	Report	Hulk 9', 75'

Estadio Nuevo Colombino, Huelva
Attendance: 1,300
Referee: Eduardo Iturralde González (Spain)

29 July 2009
22:30 CEST (UTC+2)

Beşiktaş (Turkey)	0–0	(Portugal) Porto
	Report

Ramón Sánchez Pizjuán, Seville
Attendance: 500
Referee: Michael Koukoulakis (Greece)

== Knockout stage ==
=== Semi-finals ===
31 July 2009
20:30 CEST (UTC+2)

Porto (Portugal)	1–2	(England) Aston Villa
Hulk 90' (pen.)	Report	Heskey 14'; Sidwell 37'

La Rosaleda, Málaga
Referee: Michael Koukoulakis (Greece)

31 July 2009
22:30 CEST (UTC+2)

Juventus (Italy)	2–1	(Spain) Real Madrid
Cannavaro 3'; Salihamidžić 49'	Report	Ronaldo 42' (pen.)

Ramón Sánchez Pizjuán, Seville
Referee: Stefan Johannesson (Sweden)

=== Final ===
2 August 2009
22:00 CEST (UTC+2)

Aston Villa (England)	0–0 (a.e.t.)	(Italy) Juventus
	Report
Penalties
Bannan (penalty scored); Sidwell (penalty missed); Lowry (penalty scored); A. Young (penalty scored); Herd (penalty missed); Cuéllar (penalty scored)	4–3	(penalty missed) Iaquinta; (penalty scored) Trezeguet; (penalty scored) Amauri; (penalty scored) Melo; (penalty missed) Del Piero; (penalty missed) Legrottaglie

La Cartuja, Seville
Referee: Kevin Blom (Netherlands)

== Goalscorers ==
Porto striker Hulk became the tournament's top scorer with three goals.

3 goals

- (Brazil) Hulk (Porto)

2 goals

- (Italy) Vincenzo Iaquinta (Juventus)
- (Portugal) Cristiano Ronaldo (Real Madrid)
- (Paraguay) Enrique Vera (LDU Quito)

1 goal

- (Saudi Arabia) Saud Kariri (Al-Ittihad)
- (Morocco) Hicham Aboucherouane (Al-Ittihad)
- (England) Marc Albrighton (Aston Villa)
- (Norway) John Carew (Aston Villa)
- (England) Ashley Young (Aston Villa)
- (England) Emile Heskey (Aston Villa)
- (England) Steve Sidwell (Aston Villa)
- (Argentina) Gabriel Pereyra (Atlante)
- (Mexico) Rafael Márquez Lugo (Atlante)
- (Mexico) Christian Bermúdez (Atlante)
- (Brazil) Mert Nobre (Beşiktaş)
- (Brazil) Amauri (Juventus)
- (Brazil) Diego (Juventus)
- (Italy) Nicola Legrottaglie (Juventus)
- (Bosnia and Herzegovina) Hasan Salihamidžić (Juventus)
- (Italy) Fabio Cannavaro (Juventus)
- (Ecuador) Néicer Reasco (LDU Quito)
- (Ecuador) Paúl Ambrosi (LDU Quito)
- (Argentina) Claudio Graf (LDU Quito)
- (Sweden) Kim Källström (Lyon)
- (Spain) Fernando (Málaga)
- (Spain) José Juan Luque (Málaga)
- (Spain) Raúl (Real Madrid)
- (Spain) Guti (Real Madrid)
- (Germany) Christoph Metzelder (Real Madrid)
- (Spain) Álvaro Negredo (Real Madrid)
- (France) Sébastien Squillaci (Sevilla)

1 own goal

- (England) Curtis Davies (against Atlante)

== Broadcasting rights ==
The following broadcasting systems had the rights for the broadcast of 2009 Peace Cup.

Region/Country	Broadcaster(s)	Ref.
Brazil	SporTV	
Ecuador	Teleamazonas (Note: Only LDU Quito games, semi-finals and final)	
Italy	La7 (Note: Only semi-finals and final)	
Latin America	ESPN	
Portugal	Sport TV	
South Korea	SBS	
Spain	LaSexta	
United States	GOL TV	
