= Football at the 2009 Summer Universiade – Women's tournament =

The women's tournament of football at the 2009 Summer Universiade in Serbia began on June 30 and ended on July 10, 2009.

== Teams ==
Africa	Americas	Asia	Europe	Automatic qualifiers
South Africa	Brazil; Canada	China; ~~Chinese Taipei~~; Japan; South Korea	France; Estonia; Germany; Great Britain; Hungary; Poland; Republic of Ireland; Russia	Serbia– Universiade hosts

== Preliminary round ==
=== Group A ===
Team	Pld	W	D	L	GF	GA	GD	Pts
China	3	2	0	1	6	2	4	6
Canada	3	2	0	1	6	3	3	6
Serbia	3	1	0	2	3	5	-2	3
Poland	3	1	0	2	2	7	-5	3

2009-06-30
10:30

Serbia	2–1	Canada
Sretenović 37', 40'	Report	Mayer 73'

Miloš Obilić Stadium, Belgrade
Referee: Nami Sato (JPN)

2009-06-30
17:30

China	3–0	Poland
Xu 45+4'; Wang 63' 75'	Report

Miloš Obilić Stadium, Belgrade
Referee: Sabine Bonnin (FRA)

2009-07-02
10:30

Canada	2–1	China
Mayer 45+2'; Wright 81'	Report	Wang 30'

Omladinski Stadium, Belgrade
Referee: Rhona Daly (IRL)

2009-07-02
17:30

Poland	2–1	Serbia
Żelazko 60'; Półtorak 65'	Report	Jovanović 85'

Omladinski Stadium, Belgrade
Referee: Anastasia Pustovoitova (RUS)

2009-07-04
10:30

Serbia	0–2	China
	Report	Sun 44'; Liu 90+4'

Miloš Obilić Stadium, Belgrade
Referee: Katalin Anna Kulcsar (HUN)

2009-07-04
10:30

Poland	0–3	Canada
	Report	Gagne 16'; Wright 72'; Flock 82'

Fortress Stadium, Smederevo
Referee: Morgan Pirie (GBR)

=== Group B ===
Team	Pld	W	D	L	GF	GA	GD	Pts
Russia	2	2	0	0	10	0	10	6
Great Britain	2	1	0	1	10	1	9	3
Estonia	2	0	0	2	0	19	-19	0

2009-06-30
17:30

Great Britain	10–0	Estonia
Taylor 12', 50', 61'; Mccatty 22'; Harries 27'; Kane 29', 30', 33'; Walker 38'; Jones 87'	Report

Stadium FC Lokomotiva, Belgrade
Referee: Riem Hussein (GER)

2009-07-02
17:30

Estonia	0–9	Russia
	Report	Sochneva 23', 38', 55', 67', 84'; Stepanenko 45'; Rabakh 48', 54'; MikhailovaRabakh 90+1'

Fortress Stadium, Smederevo
Referee: Kim Sook-hee (KOR)

2009-07-04
10:30

Russia	1–0	Great Britain
Dyachkova 90+3'	Report

Stadium Voždovac, Belgrade
Referee: Sabine Bonnin (FRA)

=== Group C ===
Team	Pld	W	D	L	GF	GA	GD	Pts
Brazil	3	3	0	0	11	1	10	9
South Korea	3	2	0	1	16	1	15	6
Germany	3	1	0	2	7	9	-2	3
South Africa	3	0	0	3	3	26	-23	0

2009-06-30
10:30

Brazil	7–1	South Africa
Fonseca 6'; Rocha 15', 20', 80' (pen.); D. Santos 29'; Rosa 64'; Leandro 77'	Report	Modiko 47'

Stadium Voždovac, Belgrade
Referee: Katalin Anna Kulcsar (HUN)

2009-06-30
17:30

South Korea	4–0	Germany
Yoo Young-a 27', 67'; Jeon Ga-Eul 70', 80'	Report

Stadium Voždovac, Belgrade
Referee: Michelle Pye (CAN)

2009-07-02
17:30

South Africa	0–12	South Korea
	Report	Jeon Ga-Eul 5', 23', 45', 51', 76', 83'; Yoo Young-a 7'; Lee Eun-mi 12', 14', 56', 73', 90+3'

Stadium FK Kolubara, Lazarevac
Referee: Karolina Radzik (POL)

2009-07-03
10:30

Germany	0–3	Brazil
	Report	S. Santos 6', 65'; Martines 73'

Stadion FK Indjija, Inđija
Referee: Wang Jia (CHN)

2009-07-04
17:30

Brazil	1–0	South Korea
Villar 71'	Report

Stadium FK Kolubara, Lazarevac
Referee: Gordana Kuzmanović (SRB)

2009-07-04
17:30

Germany	7–2	South Africa
Henseler 30', 80'; Cao 38', 41' (pen.); Breunig 60', 72'	Report	Ntsibande 23', 90+2' (pen.)

Stadium FK Srem Beograd, Belgrade
Referee: Nami Sato (JPN)

=== Group D ===
Team	Pld	W	D	L	GF	GA	GD	Pts
France	3	2	1	0	4	0	4	7
Japan	3	1	2	0	4	1	3	5
Republic of Ireland	3	1	0	2	3	6	-3	3
Hungary	3	0	1	2	3	7	-4	1

2009-06-30
10:30

Republic of Ireland	0–3	Japan
	Report	Otaki 57' 62'; Nakade 75'

Železnik Stadium, Belgrade
Referee: Gordana Kuzmanovic (SRB)

2009-06-30
17:30

France	3–0	Hungary
Ayachi 12'; Castera 63', 90'	Report

Železnik Stadium, Belgrade
Referee: Morag Pirie (GBR)

2009-07-02
10:30

Japan	0–0	France
	Report

Stadium FK Srem Beograd, Belgrade
Referee: Danijela Markovic (SRB)

2009-07-02
17:30

Hungary	2–3	Republic of Ireland
Tálosi 29'; Tóth 50'	Report	Waldron 54'; Quinn 70'; Jenkins 84'

Stadium FK Srem Beograd, Belgrade
Referee: Riem Hussein (GER)

2009-07-04
10:30

Republic of Ireland	0–1	France
	Report	Plaza 23'

Stadium FC Lokomotiva, Belgrade
Referee: Michelle Pye (CAN)

2009-07-04
10:30

Hungary	1–1	Japan
Mery 6'	Report	Koyama 23'

Železnik Stadium, Belgrade
Referee: Pamela Chiwya (RSA)

== Classification 9-15 places ==
2009-07-06
10:30

Serbia	5–0	Hungary
Malinić 12', 15'; Slović 43'; Sretenović 54', 56'	Report

Fortress Stadium, Smederevo
Referee: Karolina Radizik (POL)

2009-07-06
10:30

Poland	2–1	Republic of Ireland
Krawczak Paulina 31'; Zelazko 56'	Report	Doherty 32'

Stadium Voždovac, Belgrade
Referee: Kim Sook-hee (KOR)

2009-07-06
10:30

Estonia	2–1	South Africa
Palmaru 14'; Aarna 81'	Report	Sukazi 33'

Železnik Stadium, Belgrade
Referee: Anastasia Pustovoitova (RUS)

== Quarterfinals ==
2009-07-06
17:30

China	0–1	Japan
		Matsuda 14'

Fortress Stadium, Smederevo
Referee: Reim Hussein (GER)

2009-07-06
17:30

Great Britain	1–1 (p. 2–0)	Brazil
Culvin 81'	Report	Rocha 9'

Stadium FC Lokomotiva, Belgrade
Referee: Danijela Markovic (SRB)

2009-07-06
17:30

Canada	1–4	France
Wright 2'	Report	Castera 20'; Houara 24'; Plaza 90+4'; Peslerbe 90+4'

Stadium Voždovac, Belgrade
Referee: Wang Jia (CHN)

2009-07-06
17:30

Russia	0–0 (p. 3–5)	South Korea
	Report

Železnik Stadium, Belgrade
Referee: Rhona Daly (IRL)

== Classification round ==
=== Classification 13–15 places ===
2009-07-08
10:30

Republic of Ireland	6–3	South Africa
Burke 21', 45+2'; Waldron 28'; Mcgrath 45'; Sheridan 51'; Furness 82'	Report	Mgudu 14'; Mbawu 61'; Ntsibande 69'

Stadium Voždovac, Belgrade
Referee: Nami Sato (JPN)

=== Classification 9–12 places ===
2009-07-08
10:30

Serbia	0–4	Germany
	Report	Groll 18'; Goddard 23'; Henseler 47', 61'

Omladinski Stadium, Belgrade
Referee: Michelle Pye (CAN)

2009-07-08
10:30

Poland	8–2	Estonia
Poltorak 20', 33', 77'; Snopek 28', 41'; Zelazko 72' 74', 76'	Report	Aarna 29'; Palmaru 81'

Miloš Obilić Stadium, Belgrade
Referee: Pamela Chiwaya (RSA)

=== Classification 5–8 places ===
2009-07-08
17:30

China	0–1	Brazil
	Report	Villar 90+4'

Fortress Stadium, Smederevo
Referee: Morgan Pirie (GBR)

2009-07-09
11:00

Canada	3–5	Russia
Gagné 38' (pen.); Flock 53', 60'	Report	Stepanenko 22'; Ryabinicheva 36', 69'; Sochneva 41'; Harchenko 90+1'

Stadium FK Teleoptik, Belgrade
Referee: Gordana Kuzmanovic (SRB)

== Semifinals ==
2009-07-08
17:30

Japan	1–1 (p. 6–5)	Great Britain
Marsh 37' (o.g.)	Report	Taylor 61'

Stadion FK Indjija, Inđija
Referee: Anastasia Pustovoitova (RUS)

2009-07-08
17:30

France	0–0 (p. 3–4)	South Korea
	Report

Stadium FK Srem Jakovo, Jakovo
Referee: Katalin Anna Kulcsar (HUN)

== Finals ==
=== 13th place game ===
2009-07-10
10:30

Hungary	3–2	Republic of Ireland
Tóth 8', 24'; Tálosi 77'	Report	Waldron 4' (pen.)

Miloš Obilić Stadium, Belgrade
Referee: Wang Jia (CHN)

=== 11th place game ===
2009-07-10
10:30

Serbia	4–0	Estonia
Sretenović 15'; Krstić 31', 47', 72'	Report

Fortress Stadium, Smederevo
Referee: Rhona Daily (IRL)

=== 9th place game ===
2009-07-10
10:30

Germany	0–2	Poland
	Report	Radtke 3' (o.g.); Poltorak 50'

Stadium FC Lokomotiva, Belgrade
Referee: Danijela Markovic (SRB)

=== 7th place game ===
2009-07-10
10:30

China	0–0 (p. 3–4)	Canada
	Report

Stadium FK Srem Jakovo, Jakovo
Referee: Karolina Radzik (POL)

=== 5th place game ===
2009-07-10
10:30

Brazil	1–2	Russia
Riboura 55' (pen.)	Report	Sochneva 5', 19'

Železnik Stadium, Belgrade
Referee: Kim Sook-hee (KOR)

=== Bronze medal match ===
2009-07-10
10:30

Great Britain	4–1	France
Taylor 2', 69'; Jones 10'; Harries 56'	Report	Castera 78'

Omladinski Stadium, Belgrade
Referee: Gordana Kuzmanovic (SRB)

== Gold medal match ==
2009-07-10
17:00

Japan	1–4	South Korea
Lee Sun-min 89' (o.g.)	Report	Ji So-yun 24', 39'; Jeon Ga-eul 52', 70'

Partizan Stadium, Belgrade
Referee: Sabine Bonnin (FRA)

== Final standings ==
Place	Team
1st place, gold medalist(s)	South Korea
2nd place, silver medalist(s)	Japan
3rd place, bronze medalist(s)	Great Britain
4	France
5	Russia
6	Brazil
7	Canada
8	China
9	Poland
10	Germany
11	Serbia
12	Estonia
13	Hungary
14	Republic of Ireland
15	South Africa

== Goalscorers ==
10 goals

- (South Korea) Jeon Ga-eul

8 goals

- (Russia) Ekaterina Sochneva

6 goals

- (United Kingdom) Jodie Taylor

5 goals

- (Poland) Anna Żelazko
- (South Korea) Lee Eun-mi
- (Poland) Halina Poltorak
- (Serbia) Jovana Sretenović
