= 2008 in Brazilian football =

Football in Brazil
- Season: 2008

The following article presents a summary of the 2008 football (soccer) season in Brazil, which was the 107th season of competitive football in the country.

== Campeonato Brasileiro Série A ==
The Campeonato Brasileiro Série A 2008 began on May 10, 2008, and concluded on December 7, 2008.

Pos	Team	Pld	W	D	L	GF	GA	GD	Pts	Qualification or relegation
1	São Paulo	38	21	12	5	66	36	+30	75	Copa Libertadores 2009
2	Grêmio	38	21	9	8	59	35	+24	72	Copa Libertadores 2009
3	Cruzeiro	38	21	4	13	59	44	+15	67	Copa Libertadores 2009
4	Palmeiras	38	19	8	11	55	45	+10	65	Copa Libertadores 2009
5	Flamengo	38	18	10	10	67	48	+19	64	Copa Sudamericana 2009
6	Internacional	38	15	9	14	48	47	+1	54	Copa Sudamericana 2009
7	Botafogo	38	15	8	15	51	44	+7	53	Copa Sudamericana 2009
8	Goiás	38	14	11	13	57	47	+10	53	Copa Sudamericana 2009
9	Coritiba	38	14	11	13	55	48	+7	53	Copa Sudamericana 2009
10	Vitória	38	15	7	16	48	44	+4	52	Copa Sudamericana 2009
11	Sport	38	14	10	14	48	45	+3	52	Copa Libertadores 2009
12	Atlético Mineiro	38	12	12	14	50	61	−11	48	Copa Sudamericana 2009
13	Atlético Paranaense	38	12	9	17	45	54	−9	45	Copa Sudamericana 2009
14	Fluminense	38	11	12	15	49	48	+1	45	Copa Sudamericana 2009
15	Santos	38	11	12	15	44	53	−9	45	
16	Náutico	38	11	11	16	44	54	−10	44	
17	Figueirense	38	11	11	16	49	72	−23	44	Relegation to Série B
18	Vasco da Gama	38	11	7	20	56	72	−16	40	Relegation to Série B
19	Portuguesa	38	9	11	18	48	70	−22	38	Relegation to Série B
20	Ipatinga	38	9	8	21	37	66	−29	35	Relegation to Série B

Source: rsssfbrasil.com
Rules for classification: 1) points; 2) goal difference; 3) number of goals scored.

São Paulo declared as the Campeonato Brasileiro champions.

=== Relegation ===
The four worst placed teams, which are Figueirense, Vasco da Gama, Portuguesa and Ipatinga, were relegated to the following year's second level.

== Campeonato Brasileiro Série B ==
The Campeonato Brasileiro Série B 2008 began on May 9, 2008, and concluded on November 29, 2008.

Pos	Team	Pld	W	D	L	GF	GA	GD	Pts	Promotion or relegation
1	Corinthians	38	25	10	3	79	29	+50	85	Promotion to Série A 2009
2	Santo André	38	19	11	8	71	45	+26	68	Promotion to Série A 2009
3	Avaí	38	18	13	7	71	40	+31	67	Promotion to Série A 2009
4	Barueri	38	20	3	15	58	55	+3	63	Promotion to Série A 2009
5	Ponte Preta	38	17	7	14	54	46	+8	58	
6	Vila Nova	38	17	7	14	57	55	+2	58	
7	Bragantino	38	16	9	13	47	41	+6	57	
8	Juventude	38	16	8	14	51	48	+3	56	
9	São Caetano	38	14	12	12	61	55	+6	54	
10	Bahia	38	14	10	14	47	65	−18	52	
11	Paraná	38	14	7	17	49	54	−5	49	
12	Ceará	38	12	13	13	52	50	+2	49	
13	ABC	38	12	12	14	55	57	−2	48	
14	Brasiliense	38	13	8	17	56	64	−8	47	
15	América de Natal	38	12	10	16	46	51	−5	46	
16	Fortaleza	38	12	9	17	56	56	0	45	
17	Marília	38	11	12	15	47	60	−13	45	Relegation to Série C 2009
18	Criciúma	38	11	8	19	40	54	−14	41	Relegation to Série C 2009
19	Gama	38	9	8	21	37	72	−35	35	Relegation to Série C 2009
20	CRB	38	5	9	24	35	72	−37	24	Relegation to Série C 2009

Corinthians declared as the Campeonato Brasileiro Série B champions.

=== Promotion ===
The four best placed teams, which are Corinthians, Santo André, Avaí and Barueri, were promoted to the following year's first level.

=== Relegation ===
The four worst placed teams, which are Marília, Criciúma, Gama and CRB, were relegated to the following year's third level.

== Campeonato Brasileiro Série C ==
The Campeonato Brasileiro Série C 2008 began on July 6, 2008, and concluded on November 23, 2008.

Final stage
Pos	Team	Pld	W	D	L	GF	GA	GD	Pts
1	(Goiás) Atlético Goianiense (P)	14	9	2	3	35	10	+25	29
2	(São Paulo (state)) Guarani (P)	14	6	3	5	25	22	+3	21
3	(Paraíba) Campinense (P)	14	5	6	3	19	20	−1	21
4	(Rio de Janeiro (state)) Duque de Caxias (P)	14	5	3	6	27	31	−4	18
5	(Pará) Águia de Marabá	14	5	3	6	20	24	−4	18
6	(Rio Grande do Sul) Brasil	14	5	2	7	17	21	−4	17
7	(Sergipe) Confiança	14	5	2	7	23	33	−10	17
8	(Acre (state)) Rio Branco	14	5	1	8	25	30	−5	16

(P) Promoted to Série B 2009

Atlético Goianiense declared as the Campeonato Brasileiro Série C champions.

=== Promotion ===
The four best placed teams in the final stage of the competition, which are Atlético Goianiense, Guarani, Campinense and Duque de Caxias, were promoted to the following year's second level.

== Copa do Brasil ==
The Copa do Brasil 2008 began on February 14, 2008, and ended on June 11, 2008. The Copa do Brasil final was played between Corinthians and Sport.

June 4, 2008

Corinthians	3–1	Sport

Morumbi

June 11, 2008

Sport	2–0	Corinthians

Ilha do Retiro

Sport won on away goals after 3-3 in aggregate score.

== State championship champions ==
State	Champion
(Acre (state)) Acre	Rio Branco
Alagoas	CSA
Amapá	Cristal
(Amazonas (Brazilian state)) Amazonas	Holanda
Bahia	Vitória
Ceará	Fortaleza
(Federal District (Brazil)) Distrito Federal	Brasiliense
Espírito Santo	Serra
Goiás	Itumbiara
Maranhão	Moto Club
Mato Grosso	Mixto
Mato Grosso do Sul	Ivinhema
Minas Gerais	Cruzeiro
Pará	Remo
Paraíba	Campinense
(Paraná (state)) Paraná	Coritiba
Pernambuco	Sport
Piauí	Barras
(Rio de Janeiro (state)) Rio de Janeiro	Flamengo
Rio Grande do Norte	ABC
Rio Grande do Sul	Internacional
Rondônia	Ulbra
Roraima	Roraima
(Santa Catarina (state)) Santa Catarina	Figueirense
(São Paulo (state)) São Paulo	Palmeiras
Sergipe	Confiança
Tocantins	Tocantins

== Youth competition champions ==
Competition	Champion
Campeonato Brasileiro Sub-20	Grêmio
Copa 2 de Julho	Internacional
Copa Brasil Sub-17 (Copa Nacional do Espírito Santo Sub-17)^{(1)}	Vasco
Copa Macaé de Juvenis	Cruzeiro
Copa Santiago de Futebol Juvenil	Grêmio
Copa São Paulo de Juniores	Figueirense
Copa Sub-17 de Promissão	Figueirense
Porto Seguro Cup	Santos (June edition); Internacional (November edition)
Taça Belo Horizonte de Juniores	Grêmio

^{(1)} The Copa Nacional do Espírito Santo Sub-17, between 2008 and 2012, was named Copa Brasil Sub-17. The similar named Copa do Brasil Sub-17 is organized by the Brazilian Football Confederation and it was first played in 2013.

== Other competition champions ==
Competition	Champion
Campeonato Paulista do Interior	Grêmio Barueri
Copa Espírito Santo	Rio Branco-ES
Copa Governador do Mato Grosso	Araguaia
Copa Integração	Icasa
Copa Lupi Martins	Pelotas
Copa Paraná	Londrina
Copa Paulista de Futebol	Atlético Sorocaba
Copa Peregrino	Botafogo
Copa Pernambuco	Santa Cruz
Copa Rio	Nova Iguaçu
Copa Santa Catarina	Brusque
Recopa Sul-Brasileira	Brusque
Taça Minas Gerais	Tupi

== Brazilian clubs in international competitions ==
Team	Copa Libertadores 2008	Copa Sudamericana 2008
Atlético Mineiro	did not qualify	First stage eliminated by (Brazil) Botafogo
Atlético Paranaense	did not qualify	Round of 16 eliminated by (Mexico) Guadalajara
Botafogo	did not qualify	Quarterfinals eliminated by (Argentina) Estudiantes
Cruzeiro	Round of 16 eliminated by (Argentina) Boca Juniors	did not qualify
Flamengo	Round of 16 eliminated by (Mexico) América	did not qualify
Fluminense	Runner-up lost to (Ecuador) LDU Quito	did not qualify
Grêmio	did not qualify	First stage eliminated by (Brazil) Internacional
Internacional	did not qualify	Champions defeated (Argentina) Estudiantes
Palmeiras	did not qualify	Quarterfinals eliminated by (Argentina) Argentinos Jrs.
Santos	Quarterfinals eliminated by (Mexico) América	did not qualify
São Paulo	Quarterfinals eliminated by (Brazil) Fluminense	First stage eliminated by (Brazil) Atl. Paranaense
Vasco	did not qualify	First stage eliminated by (Brazil) Palmeiras

== Brazil national team ==
The following table lists all the games played by the Brazil national football team in official competitions and friendly matches during 2008.

Date	City	Opposition	Result	Score	Brazil scorers	Competition
February 6, 2008	(Republic of Ireland) Dublin	Republic of Ireland	W	1–0	Robinho	International Friendly
March 26, 2008	(England) London	Sweden	W	1–0	Pato	International Friendly
May 31, 2008	(United States) Seattle	Canada	W	3–2	Diego, Fabiano, Robinho	International Friendly
June 6, 2008	(United States) Boston	Venezuela	L	0–2	-	International Friendly
June 15, 2008	(Paraguay) Asunción	Paraguay	L	0–2	-	World Cup Qualifying
June 18, 2008	(Brazil) Belo Horizonte	Argentina	D	0–0	-	World Cup Qualifying
September 7, 2008	(Chile) Santiago	Chile	W	3–0	Fabiano (2), Robinho	World Cup Qualifying
September 10, 2008	(Brazil) Rio de Janeiro	Bolivia	D	0–0	-	World Cup Qualifying
October 12, 2008	(Venezuela) San Cristóbal	Venezuela	W	4–0	Kaká, Robinho (2), Adriano	World Cup Qualifying
October 15, 2008	(Brazil) Rio de Janeiro	Colombia	D	0–0	-	World Cup Qualifying
November 19, 2008	(Brazil) Brasília	Portugal	W	6–2	Fabiano (3), Maicon, Elano, Adriano	International Friendly

TBD = to be decided

== Women's football ==
=== Brazil women's national football team ===
The following table lists all the games played by the Brazil women's national football team in official competitions and friendly matches during 2008.

Date	Opposition	Result	Score	Brazil scorers	Competition
April 19, 2008	Ghana	W	5–1	Marta, Cristiane Silva (2), Aline Pellegrino, Rosana	Olympics Qualifying
June 15, 2008	Italy	W	2–1	Érika, Maurine	Peace Queen Cup
June 17, 2008	United States	L	0–1	-	Peace Queen Cup
June 19, 2008	Australia	L	0–1	-	Peace Queen Cup
July 10, 2008	Canada	D	1–1	Raquel II	International Friendly
July 13, 2008	United States	L	0–1	-	International Friendly
July 16, 2008	United States	L	0–1	-	International Friendly
July 24, 2008	(Sweden) Umeå	W	2–0	Fabiana II, Cristiane Silva	International Friendly (unofficial match)
July 27, 2008	(Sweden) Umeå/ Finland Combined Team	W	4–0	Rosana, Marta, Pretinha, Cristiane Silva	International Friendly (unofficial match)
August 6, 2008	Germany	D	0–0	-	Summer Olympics
August 9, 2008	South Korea	W	2–1	Daniela Alves, Marta	Summer Olympics
August 12, 2008	Nigeria	W	3–1	Cristiane Silva (3)	Summer Olympics
August 15, 2008	Norway	W	2–1	Daniela Alves, Marta	Summer Olympics
August 18, 2008	Germany	W	4–1	Formiga, Cristiane Silva (2), Marta	Summer Olympics
August 21, 2008	United States	L	0–1	-	Summer Olympics

The Brazil women's national football team competed in the following competitions in 2008:

Competition	Performance
FIFA U-17 Women's World Cup	Group stage
FIFA U-20 Women's World Cup	Quarter-finals
Peace Queen Cup	Group stage
Summer Olympics	Runner-up

=== Copa do Brasil de Futebol Feminino ===
The Copa do Brasil de Futebol Feminino 2008 began on November 1, 2008, and concluded on December 17, 2008. The Copa do Brasil de Futebol Feminino final was played between Santos and Sport.

December 14, 2008

Sport	1–3	Santos

Ilha do Retiro

December 17, 2008

Santos	3–0	Sport

Ulrico Mursa

Santos declared as the cup champions by aggregate score of 6–1.

=== Other domestic competition champions ===
Competition	Champion
Campeonato Carioca	Campo Grande
Campeonato Paulista	Botucatu
