= 2010 Peace Queen Cup =

Peace Queen Cup Suwon 2010

Tournament details
- Host country: South Korea
- Dates: 17–23 October
- Teams: 6 (from 4 confederations)
- Venue(s): 2 (in 1 host city)

Final positions
- Champions: South Korea (1st title)
- Runners-up: Australia

Tournament statistics
- Matches played: 7
- Goals scored: 9 (1.29 per match)
- Top scorer(s): (Australia) Kate Gill (3 goals)
- Best player(s): (South Korea) Jeon Ga-eul

The 2010 Peace Queen Cup was the third and last edition of the Peace Queen Cup. It was held from 17 to 23 October 2010 in Suwon, South Korea.

== Venues ==
Suwon
Suwon World Cup Stadium	Suwon Sports Complex
Capacity: 43,959	Capacity: 24,670

== Group stage ==
=== Group A ===
Team	Pld	W	D	L	GF	GA	GD	Pts
South Korea (Note: South Korea advanced to the final on drawing of lots.)	2	0	2	0	0	0	0	2
England	2	0	2	0	0	0	0	2
New Zealand	2	0	2	0	0	0	0	2

17 October 2010
14:00

South Korea	0–0	New Zealand

Suwon World Cup Stadium, Suwon

19 October 2010
14:00

England	0–0	South Korea

Suwon Civil Stadium, Suwon

21 October 2010
14:00

New Zealand	0–0	England

Suwon Civil Stadium, Suwon

=== Group B ===
Team	Pld	W	D	L	GF	GA	GD	Pts
Australia	2	2	0	0	4	1	+3	6
Mexico	2	1	0	1	2	3	–1	3
Chinese Taipei	2	0	0	2	0	2	–2	0

17 October 2010
17:00

Australia	3–1	Mexico
McCallum 26'; Gill 29'; Shipard 63'	Report	Domínguez 64'

Suwon World Cup Stadium, Suwon

19 October 2010
17:00

Chinese Taipei	0–1	Australia
		Gill 17'

Suwon Civil Stadium, Suwon

21 October 2010
17:00

Mexico	1–0	Chinese Taipei
Morales 43'

Suwon Civil Stadium, Suwon

== Final ==
23 October 2010
14:00

South Korea	2–1	Australia
Kim Na-rae 16'; Jeon Ga-eul 56'		Gill 57'

Suwon World Cup Stadium, Suwon

== Awards ==
Award	Winner
Golden Ball	(South Korea) Jeon Ga-eul
Golden Shoe	(Australia) Kate Gill

== Goalscorers ==
3 goals

- (Australia) Kate Gill

1 goal

- (Australia) Collette McCallum
- (Australia) Sally Shipard
- (South Korea) Jeon Ga-eul
- (South Korea) Kim Na-rae
- (Mexico) Maribel Domínguez
- (Mexico) Tania Paola Morales
