= Marie-Pierre Castera =

French footballer

Personal information
- Date of birth: 12 January 1987 (age 39)
- Place of birth: Auch, France
- Height: 1.64 m (5 ft 5 in)
- Position: Forward

Marie-Pierre Castera (born 12 January 1987) is a French footballer who played for Toulouse FC in the Seconde Ligue. Castera also played at the Football at the 2009 Summer Universiade – Women's tournament.
