= 2008 Peace Queen Cup =

Peace Queen Cup 2008 Suwon

Tournament details
- Host country: South Korea
- Dates: 14 – 21 June
- Teams: 8 (from 4 confederations)
- Venues: 2 (in 1 host city)

Final positions
- Champions: United States (2nd title)
- Runners-up: Canada

Tournament statistics
- Matches played: 13
- Goals scored: 31 (2.38 per match)
- Top scorer(s): (Canada) Christine Sinclair (5 goals)
- Best player: (United States) Angela Hucles

The 2008 Peace Queen Cup was the second edition of the Peace Queen Cup. It was held from 14 to 21 June 2008 in Suwon, South Korea.

== Venues ==
Suwon
Suwon World Cup Stadium	Suwon Civic Stadium
Capacity: 43,959	Capacity: 24,670

== Group stage ==
=== Group A ===
Team	Pld	W	D	L	GF	GA	GD	Pts
Canada	3	3	0	0	10	1	+9	9
South Korea	3	2	0	1	5	4	+1	6
New Zealand	3	1	0	2	2	4	–2	3
Argentina	3	0	0	3	0	8	–8	0

14 June 2008
17:15

South Korea	2–1	New Zealand
Kwon Hah-nul 68'; Park Hee-young 70'		Yallop 13'

Suwon World Cup Stadium, Suwon

14 June 2008
20:00

Canada	5–0	Argentina
Matheson 25'; Sinclair 46', 54'; Tancredi 59'; Timko 87' (pen.)

Suwon World Cup Stadium, Suwon

16 June 2008
14:00

South Korea	1–3	Canada
Kim Soo-yun 74'		Lang 36'; Sinclair 47', 73'

Suwon World Cup Stadium, Suwon

16 June 2008
17:00

Argentina	0–1	New Zealand
		Hearn 7'

Suwon World Cup Stadium, Suwon

18 June 2008
14:00

New Zealand	0–2	Canada
		Sinclair 2'; Lang 52' (pen.)

Suwon World Cup Stadium, Suwon

18 June 2008
17:00

Argentina	0–2	South Korea
		Cha Yun-hee 27'; Jeon Ga-eul 84'

Suwon World Cup Stadium, Suwon

=== Group B ===
Team	Pld	W	D	L	GF	GA	GD	Pts
United States	3	3	0	0	5	1	+4	9
Australia	3	2	0	1	5	2	+3	6
Brazil	3	1	0	2	2	3	–1	3
Italy	3	0	0	3	1	7	–6	0

15 June 2008
14:00

United States	2–1	Australia
Kai 35'; Wambach 77'		Garriock 57'

Suwon Civil Stadium, Suwon

15 June 2008
17:00

Brazil	2–1	Italy
Érika 6'; Maurine 77'		Zorri 45' (pen.)

Suwon Civil Stadium, Suwon

17 June 2008
14:00

United States	1–0	Brazil
Rodriguez 41'

Suwon Civil Stadium, Suwon

17 June 2008
17:00

Italy	0–3	Australia
		Garriock 66', 68'; Chapman 89'

Suwon Civil Stadium, Suwon

19 June 2008
14:00

Australia	1–0	Brazil
Simon 90+2'

Suwon Civil Stadium, Suwon

19 June 2008
17:00

Italy	0–2	United States
		Wambach 41', 51'

Suwon Civil Stadium, Suwon

== Final ==
21 June 2008
14:00

Canada	0–1	United States
		Hucles 90+2'

Suwon World Cup Stadium, Suwon

== Awards ==
Award	Winner(s)
Golden Ball	(United States) Angela Hucles
Golden Shoe	(Canada) Christine Sinclair
Fair Play Award	Italy

== Goalscorers ==
5 goals

- (Canada) Christine Sinclair

3 goals

- (Australia) Heather Garriock
- (United States) Abby Wambach

2 goals

- (Canada) Kara Lang

1 goal

- (Australia) Amy Chapman
- (Australia) Kyah Simon
- (Brazil) Érika
- (Brazil) Maurine
- (Canada) Diana Matheson
- (Canada) Melissa Tancredi
- (Canada) Brittany Timko
- (Italy) Tatiana Zorri
- (South Korea) Cha Yun-hee
- (South Korea) Jeon Ga-eul
- (South Korea) Kim Soo-yun
- (South Korea) Kwon Hah-nul
- (South Korea) Park Hee-young
- (New Zealand) Amber Hearn
- (New Zealand) Kirsty Yallop
- (United States) Natasha Kai
- (United States) Amy Rodriguez
