= Nina Hasselmann =

German field hockey player (born 1986)

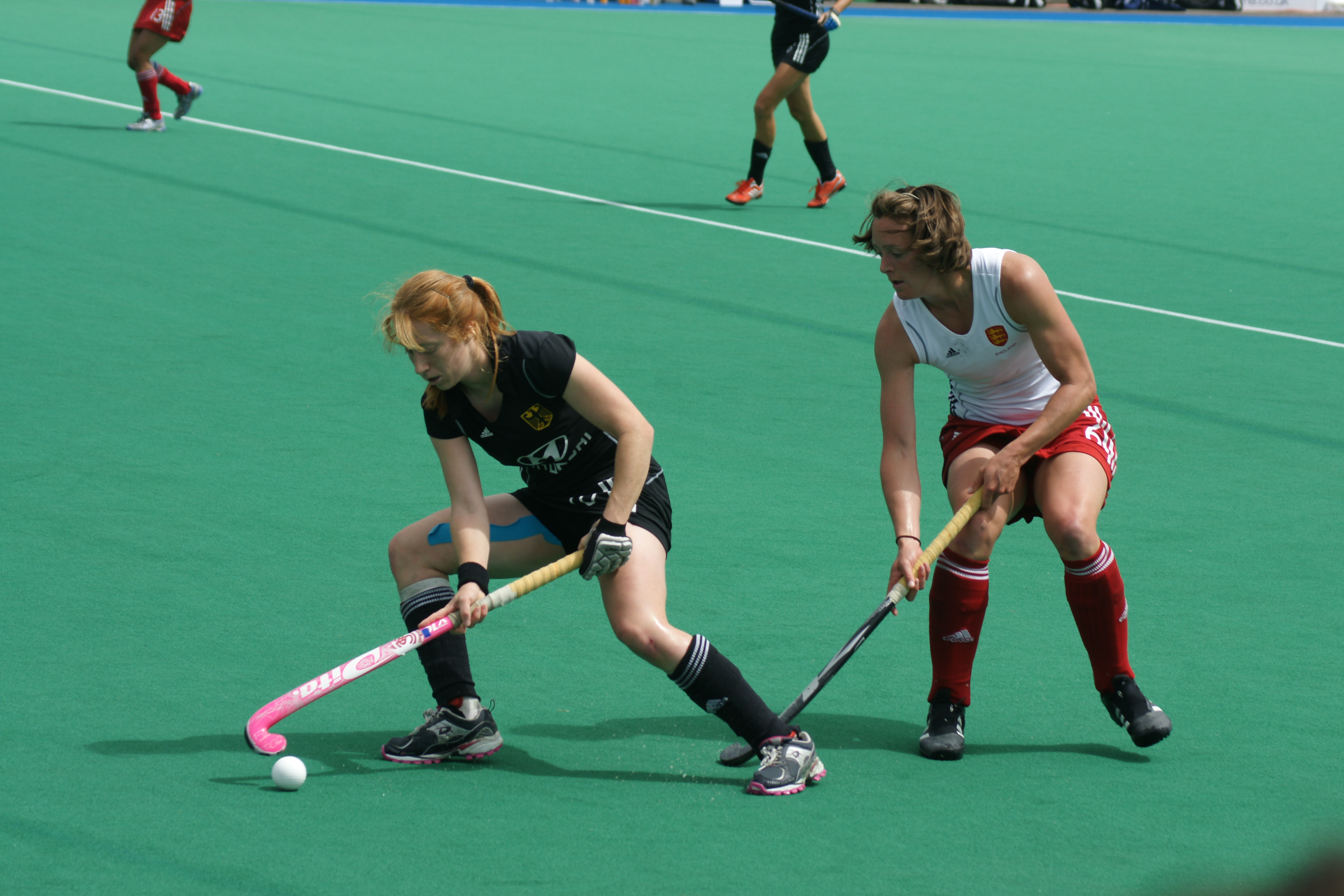
- 2010 Women's Hockey Champions Trophy England vs. Germany Bronze medal match

Personal information
- Born: 31 May 1986 (age 40) Nürnberg, West Germany
- Height: 160 cm (5 ft 3 in)
- Weight: 57 kg (126 lb)

Sport
- Sport: Field hockey
National team
Years	Team	Caps	Goals
2005	Germany U21	8	(1)
2008-2016	Germany	219	(7)

Nina Hasselmann (born 31 May 1986, Nürnberg, West Germany) is a German field hockey player. At the 2012 Summer Olympics, she competed for the Germany women's national field hockey team in the women's event.
