= 2014 Women's EuroHockey Indoor Championship III =

2014 Women's EuroHockey Indoor Nations Championship - Division III
Tournament details
- Host country: Croatia
- City: Poreč
- Dates: 24–26 January
- Teams: 5
- Venue: Žatika Sport Centre

Final positions
- Champions: Croatia
- Runner-up: Turkey
- Third place: Sweden

The 2014 Women's EuroHockey Indoor Nations Championship - Division III was the lowest division of EuroHockey Indoor Nations Championship, that was played on January 24–26, 2014 in Poreč, Croatia. The winner got promoted to 2016 Women's EuroHockey Indoor Nations Championship - Division II.

== Results ==
=== Group stage ===
Team	Pld	W	D	L	PF	PA	PD	Pts
Turkey	4	3	1	0	14	3	+11	10
Croatia	4	3	0	1	14	8	+6	9
Bulgaria	4	2	0	2	9	13	-4	6
Sweden	4	1	1	2	6	8	-2	4
Portugal	4	0	0	4	9	20	-11	0

=== Bronze final ===
26 January 2014
11:00

Bulgaria	2 - 3	Sweden

=== Gold final ===
26 January 2014
12:10

Turkey	2 - 3	Croatia

== Final ranking ==
Promoted to 2016 Women's EuroHockey Indoor Nations Championship - Division II.

#	Teams
1	Croatia
2	Turkey
3	Sweden
4	Bulgaria
5	Portugal
