= Jeon Ga-eul =

South Korean footballer (born 1988)

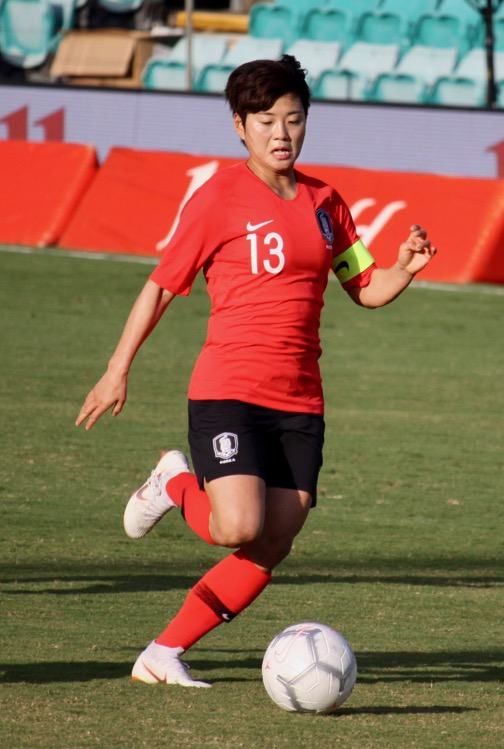

Personal information
- Full name: Jeon Ga-eul
- Date of birth: 14 September 1988 (age 38)
- Place of birth: Paju, South Korea
- Height: 1.62 m (5 ft 4 in)
- Positions: Forward; midfielder

Youth career
- Yeojoo Institute of Technology

Senior career*
Years	Team	Apps	(Gls)
2009–2010	Suwon FMC	34	(13)
2011–2015	Hyundai Steel Red Angels		
2016	Western New York Flash	2	(0)
2016–2017	Hyundai Steel Red Angels		
2017–2018	Melbourne Victory	10	(1)
2018–2019	Hwacheon KSPO		
2020	Bristol City	2	(0)
2020–2021	Reading	6	(0)
2022–2023	Sejong Sportstoto		

International career
2005	South Korea U17	5	(4)
2007	South Korea U20	4	(0)
2007–2019	South Korea	101	(38)
Medal record
Asian Games
Bronze medal – third place	2010 Guangzhou	Team
Bronze medal – third place	2014 Incheon	Team
Bronze medal – third place	2018 Jakarta-Palembang	Team
Summer Universiade
Gold medal – first place	2009 Belgrade	Team
- * Club domestic league appearances and goals

- Jeon Ga-eul
- Hangul: 전가을
- RR: Jeon Gaeul
- MR: Chŏn Kaŭl

Jeon Ga-eul (Korean: 전가을, Korean pronunciation: [tɕʌn.ɡa.ɯl] or [tɕʌn] [ka.ɯl]; born 14 September 1988) is a South Korean former footballer. She was the first South Korean to play in the US National Women's Soccer League, and the Australian W-League. She has won numerous domestic league titles, individual MVP titles and international competitions, being the leading scorer in the national team side that won the Women's gold medal in football at the 2009 Summer Universiade. Jeon scored notable braces against Germany in the group stages, and against Japan in the Final. She also scored six goals in one match against South Africa. Overall, she made over 100 appearances for the South Korean national team.

== Club career ==
=== Western New York Flash ===
On 1 January 2016, the National Women's Soccer League club Western New York Flash announced the signing of Jeon for the 2016 season, making her the first player from South Korea to play in the league.

She was released by the Flash on 13 June 2016.

=== Melbourne Victory ===
On 25 October 2017, Jeon signed with Melbourne Victory, becoming the first South Korean player to join the W-League. On 3 November 2017, she made her debut in a 1–0 loss to Melbourne City. On 9 December 2017, she scored her first goal in a 4–0 win over Adelaide United. She finished the 2017–18 season with one goal in ten appearances.

=== Hwacheon KSPO ===
In February 2018, Jeon signed with Hwacheon KSPO. On 23 April 2018, she scored on her debut in a 3–0 home victory against Boeun Sangmu.

=== Bristol City ===
Jeon Ga-eul was announced as a new signing by Bristol City of the FA WSL on 18 January 2020. Jeon made her Bristol City debut on 26 January 2020 in their Women's FA Cup fourth round victory against Durham. Due to fixture cancellations caused by bad weather, Jeon's FA WSL debut came on 12 February 2020 away at league leaders Manchester City. She received praise in the sporting press for her performance with sports website Vavel saying, "The 31-year-old played in the number 10 role in Manchester and looked like a real leader with her vast experience at international level and in the W-League shining through. The Robins' number 14 worked her socks off at both ends of the field and was encouraging her teammates every time the ball went out of play."

=== Reading ===
Having been released by Bristol at the end of the 2019–20 season, Jeon returned to the WSL by signing for Reading at the start of the 2020–21 season. She made her Reading debut on 4 October 2020, coming on as an 80th-minute substitute in their 1–0 away win at West Ham. She made her starting XI debut on 7 October 2020 in Reading's 4–0 home win over Charlton in the FA Women's League Cup. A long-term injury sustained later that month meant she made just four appearances for Reading during the 2020–21 season. After playing only two games in the first half of the 2021–22 season, Jeon left Reading in December 2021.

== International career ==
Jeon was a member of the under-17 team that finished fourth at the 2005 AFC U-17 Women's Championship, where she scored four goals in five appearances. On 12 August 2007, she made her senior debut in a 2–1 victory against Vietnam, before returning to the under-19 team to play at the 2007 AFC U-19 Women's Championship, where South Korea finished fourth. In 2008, she was called up to represent South Korea at the 2008 EAFF Women's Football Championship, at the 2008 AFC Women's Asian Cup and at the 2008 Peace Queen Cup. In 2009, she helped South Korea win gold at the 2009 Summer Universiade, finishing as the top scorer of the tournament with 10 goals. The following year, she scored the game-winning goal against Australia in the 2010 Peace Queen Cup final and was named the tournament's MVP. She was also part of the team that won bronze at the 2010 Asian Games and finished third at the 2010 EAFF Women's Football Championship. However, South Korea finished third in group B at the 2010 AFC Women's Asian Cup and failed to qualify for the World Cup. At the 2014 AFC Women's Asian Cup, she scored three goals in 5 appearances as South Korea qualified for the World Cup for the first time since 2003. She won another bronze medal at the 2014 Asian Games, where she scored six goals. In 2015, she helped South Korea finish second at the 2015 EAFF Women's East Asian Cup and at the 2015 Four Nations Tournament. Jeon played all four of South Korea's matches at the 2015 FIFA Women's World Cup, scoring a goal in a 2–2 draw with Costa Rica on 13 June 2015.

== Career statistics ==
=== Club ===
Appearances and goals by club, season and competition
Club	Season	League			National cup		League cup		Total	
Club	Season	Division	Apps	Goals	Apps	Goals	Apps	Goals	Apps	Goals
Bristol City	2019–20	FA WSL	2	0	2	0	0	0	4	0
Reading	2020–21	FA WSL	4	0	1	0	1	0	6	0
Reading	2021–22	FA WSL	2	0	0	0	0	0	2	0
Reading	Total		6	0	1	0	1	0	8	0
Career total			8	0	3	0	1	0	12	0

=== International ===
Scores and results list South Korea's goal tally first, score column indicates score after each Jeon goal.

List of international goals scored by Jeon Ga-eul
No.	Date	Venue	Opponent	Score	Result	Competition
1	26 March 2008	Nakhon Ratchasima, Thailand	Malaysia	6–0	14–0	2008 AFC Women's Asian Cup qual.
2	26 March 2008	Nakhon Ratchasima, Thailand	Malaysia	11–0	14–0	2008 AFC Women's Asian Cup qual.
3	26 March 2008	Nakhon Ratchasima, Thailand	Malaysia	13–0	14–0	2008 AFC Women's Asian Cup qual.
4	26 March 2008	Nakhon Ratchasima, Thailand	Malaysia	14–0	14–0	2008 AFC Women's Asian Cup qual.
5	18 June 2008	Suwon, South Korea	Argentina	2–0	2–0	2008 Peace Queen Cup
6	12 January 2009	Guangzhou, China	New Zealand	3–1	4–3	Friendly
7	24 August 2009	Tainan, Taiwan	Guam	1–0	9–0	2010 EAFF Women's Championship qual.
8	24 August 2009	Tainan, Taiwan	Guam	3–0	9–0	2010 EAFF Women's Championship qual.
9	28 August 2009	Tainan, Taiwan	Hong Kong	6–0	7–0	2010 EAFF Women's Championship qual.
10	30 August 2009	Tainan, Taiwan	Chinese Taipei	1–0	6–0	2010 EAFF Women's Championship qual.
11	30 August 2009	Tainan, Taiwan	Chinese Taipei	6–0	6–0	2010 EAFF Women's Championship qual.
12	7 February 2010	Tokyo, Japan	Chinese Taipei	1–0	4–0	2010 EAFF Women's Championship
13	23 October 2010	Suwon, South Korea	Australia	2–0	2–1	2010 Peace Queen Cup
14	4 March 2011	Paralimni, Cyprus	Mexico	1–0	1–1	2011 Cyprus Cup
15	14 January 2013	Chongqing, China	Canada	1–0	3–1	Friendly
16	15 May 2014	Ho Chi Minh City, Vietnam	Myanmar	4–0	12–0	2014 AFC Women's Asian Cup
17	15 May 2014	Ho Chi Minh City, Vietnam	Myanmar	5–0	12–0	2014 AFC Women's Asian Cup
18	15 May 2014	Ho Chi Minh City, Vietnam	Myanmar	10–0	12–0	2014 AFC Women's Asian Cup
19	14 September 2014	Incheon, South Korea	Thailand	4–0	5–0	2014 Asian Games
20	17 September 2014	Incheon, South Korea	India	1–0	10–0	2014 Asian Games
21	17 September 2014	Incheon, South Korea	India	4–0	10–0	2014 Asian Games
22	17 September 2014	Incheon, South Korea	India	7–0	10–0	2014 Asian Games
23	21 September 2014	Incheon, South Korea	Maldives	7–0	13–0	2014 Asian Games
24	26 September 2014	Incheon, South Korea	Chinese Taipei	1–0	1–0	2014 Asian Games
25	12 November 2014	Hsinchu, Taiwan	Guam	4–0	15–0	2015 EAFF Women's East Asian Cup qual.
26	12 November 2014	Hsinchu, Taiwan	Guam	7–0	15–0	2015 EAFF Women's East Asian Cup qual.
27	12 November 2014	Hsinchu, Taiwan	Guam	9–0	15–0	2015 EAFF Women's East Asian Cup qual.
28	12 November 2014	Hsinchu, Taiwan	Guam	13–0	15–0	2015 EAFF Women's East Asian Cup qual.
29	15 November 2014	Hsinchu, Taiwan	Hong Kong	2–0	9–0	2015 EAFF Women's East Asian Cup qual.
30	18 November 2014	Taipei, Taiwan	Chinese Taipei	2–0	2–0	2015 EAFF Women's East Asian Cup qual.
31	13 January 2015	Shenzhen, China	China	3–2	3–2	Friendly
32	15 January 2015	Shenzhen, China	Mexico	1–0	2–1	Friendly
33	13 June 2015	Montreal, Canada	Costa Rica	2–1	2–2	2015 FIFA Women's World Cup
34	4 August 2015	Wuhan, China	Japan	2–1	2–1	2015 EAFF Women's East Asian Cup
35	9 March 2016	Osaka, Japan	Vietnam	4–0	4–0	2016 AFC Women's Olympic qual.
36	16 August 2018	Palembang, Indonesia	Chinese Taipei	1–0	2–1	2018 Asian Games
37	24 August 2018	Palembang, Indonesia	Hong Kong	1–0	5–0	2018 Asian Games
38	24 August 2018	Palembang, Indonesia	Hong Kong	2–0	5–0	2018 Asian Games

== Honours ==
=== Club ===
Suwon FMC

- WK League: 2010

Incheon Hyundai Steel Red Angels

- WK League: 2013, 2014, 2015, 2017

=== International ===
- Summer Universiade: 2009
- Peace Queen Cup: 2010

=== Individual ===
- Summer Universiade Top Scorer: 2009
- Peace Queen Cup MVP: 2010
- WK League MVP: 2010
