= 2005 Peace Cup =

Tournament details
- Country: South Korea
- Venues: 6 (in 6 host cities)
- Dates: 15–24 July 2005
- Teams: 8

Final positions
- Champions: (England) Tottenham Hotspur (1st title)

Tournament statistics
- Matches played: 13
- Goals scored: 30 (2.31 per match)
- Top goal scorer(s): Robbie Keane (Tottenham Hotspur, 4 goals)

Awards
- Best player: Robbie Keane (Tottenham Hotspur)

The 2005 Peace Cup was the second competition of the Peace Cup. The eight invited teams were split into two groups, and two group winners advanced to the final. Tottenham Hotspur became champions after defeating Lyon 3–1 in the final.

== Teams ==
Team	League
(Argentina) Boca Juniors	2005–06 Argentine Primera División
(France) Lyon	2005–06 Ligue 1
(South Africa) Mamelodi Sundowns	2005–06 Premier Soccer League
(Colombia) Once Caldas	2005 Categoría Primera A
(Netherlands) PSV Eindhoven	2005–06 Eredivisie
(Spain) Real Sociedad	2005–06 La Liga
(South Korea) Seongnam Ilhwa Chunma	2005 K League
(England) Tottenham Hotspur	2005–06 FA Premier League

== Venues ==
Seoul	Suwon	Daejeon
Seoul World Cup Stadium	Suwon World Cup Stadium	Daejeon World Cup Stadium
Capacity: 66,806	Capacity: 43,959	Capacity: 40,535
2005 Peace Cup is located in South Korea
Busan	Ulsan	Gwangju
Busan Asiad Main Stadium	Ulsan Munsu Football Stadium	Gwangju World Cup Stadium
Capacity: 53,864	Capacity: 44,474	Capacity: 40,245

== Group stage ==
=== Group A ===
Team	Pld	W	D	L	GF	GA	GD	Pts
(France) Lyon	3	1	2	0	4	3	+1	5
(Netherlands) PSV Eindhoven	3	1	2	0	3	2	+1	5
(Colombia) Once Caldas	3	1	2	0	2	1	+1	5
(South Korea) Seongnam Ilhwa Chunma	3	0	0	3	2	5	–3	0

15 July 2005

PSV Eindhoven (Netherlands)	2–1	(South Korea) Seongnam Ilhwa Chunma
Cocu 4'; Robert 23'		Kim Do-hoon 11'

Seoul World Cup Stadium, Seoul

15 July 2005

Once Caldas (Colombia)	1–1	(France) Lyon
Soto 14'		Diarra 31'

Busan Asiad Main Stadium, Busan

17 July 2005

PSV Eindhoven (Netherlands)	0–0	(Colombia) Once Caldas

Gwangju World Cup Stadium, Gwangju

17 July 2005

Lyon (France)	2–1	(South Korea) Seongnam Ilhwa Chunma
Carew 40', 53'		Dudu 57'

Ulsan Munsu Football Stadium, Ulsan

20 July 2005

Seongnam Ilhwa Chunma (South Korea)	0–1	(Colombia) Once Caldas
		Ruiz 79'

Daejeon World Cup Stadium, Daejeon

20 July 2005

Lyon (France)	1–1	(Netherlands) PSV Eindhoven
Malouda 48'		Robert 37'

Suwon World Cup Stadium, Suwon

=== Group B ===
Team	Pld	W	D	L	GF	GA	GD	Pts
(England) Tottenham Hotspur	3	1	2	0	6	4	+2	5
(Argentina) Boca Juniors	3	1	2	0	5	3	+2	5
(South Africa) Mamelodi Sundowns	3	1	0	2	3	6	–3	3
(Spain) Real Sociedad	3	0	2	1	1	2	–1	2

16 July 2005

Tottenham Hotspur (England)	2–2	(Argentina) Boca Juniors
Defoe 27'; Mido 31'		Delgado 3'; Bilos 71'

Suwon World Cup Stadium, Suwon

16 July 2005

Mamelodi Sundowns (South Africa)	1–0	(Spain) Real Sociedad
Sapula 59'

Daejeon World Cup Stadium, Daejeon

18 July 2005

Tottenham Hotspur (England)	3–1	(South Africa) Mamelodi Sundowns
Keane 35', 56'; Kanouté 50'		Chabangu 77'

Suwon World Cup Stadium, Suwon

18 July 2005

Boca Juniors (Argentina)	0–0	(Spain) Real Sociedad

Busan Asiad Main Stadium, Busan

21 July 2005

Boca Juniors (Argentina)	3–1	(South Africa) Mamelodi Sundowns
Cagna 9'; Palermo 15'; Cardozo 75'		Sapula 49'

Gwangju World Cup Stadium, Gwangju

21 July 2005

Real Sociedad (Spain)	1–1	(England) Tottenham Hotspur
Paula 46'		Mido 41'

Ulsan Munsu Football Stadium, Ulsan

== Final ==
24 July 2005

Lyon (France)	1–3	(England) Tottenham Hotspur
Ben Arfa 74' (pen.)		Berthod 7' (o.g.); Keane 9', 45'

Seoul World Cup Stadium, Seoul
Referee: Kwon Jong-chul (South Korea)

== Goalscorers ==
4 goals

- (Republic of Ireland) Robbie Keane (Tottenham Hotspur)

2 goals

- (Brazil) Robert (PSV Eindhoven)
- (Egypt) Mido (Tottenham Hotspur)
- (France) John Carew (Lyon)
- (South Africa) Godfrey Sapula (Mamelodi Sundowns)

1 goal

- (Argentina) Daniel Bilos (Boca Juniors)
- (Argentina) Diego Cagna (Boca Juniors)
- (Argentina) Neri Cardozo (Boca Juniors)
- (Argentina) Marcelo Delgado (Boca Juniors)
- (Argentina) Martín Palermo (Boca Juniors)
- (Brazil) Dudu (Seongnam Ilhwa Chunma)
- (Colombia) Cristian Ruiz (Once Caldas)
- (Colombia) Elkin Soto (Once Caldas)
- (England) Jermain Defoe (Tottenham Hotspur)
- (France) Ben Arfa (Lyon)
- (Mali) Frédéric Kanouté (Tottenham Hotspur)
- (France) Florent Malouda (Lyon)
- (South Korea) Kim Do-hoon (Seongnam Ilhwa Chunma)
- (Mali) Mahamadou Diarra (Lyon)
- (Netherlands) Philip Cocu (PSV Eindhoven)
- (South Africa) Lerato Chabangu (Mamelodi Sundowns)
- (Spain) Óscar de Paula (Real Sociedad)

1 own goal

- (France) Jérémy Berthod (against Tottenham Hotspur)
