= Peace Queen Cup =

- Organiser(s): Sunmoon Peace Football Foundation (Unification Church)
- Founded: 2006
- Abolished: 2010
- Region: International
- Most championships: United States (2 titles)

The Peace Queen Cup was an invitational women's association football tournament for national teams organized by the Sunmoon Peace Football Foundation. Its three editions were all hosted by South Korea. The foundation also organized the Peace Cup, a men's tournament featuring club teams.

== Results ==
=== Finals ===
| Year | Host | Champions | Score | Runners-up | Teams |
|---|---|---|---|---|---|
| 2006 | South Korea | United States | 1–0 | Canada | 8 |
| 2008 | South Korea | United States | 1–0 | Canada | 8 |
| 2010 | South Korea | South Korea | 2–1 | Australia | 6 |

=== Titles by club ===
| Team | Champions | Runners-up |
|---|---|---|
| United States | 2 (2006, 2008) | — |
| South Korea | 1 (2010) | — |
| Canada | — | 2 (2006, 2008) |
| Australia | — | 1 (2010) |

=== All-time table ===
| Team | Part | Pld | W | D | L | GF | GA | GD | Pts |
|---|---|---|---|---|---|---|---|---|---|
| United States | 2 | 8 | 7 | 1 | 0 | 12 | 2 | +10 | 22 |
| Canada | 2 | 8 | 6 | 0 | 2 | 20 | 8 | +12 | 18 |
| Australia | 3 | 8 | 3 | 2 | 3 | 7 | 6 | +1 | 11 |
| South Korea | 3 | 9 | 3 | 2 | 4 | 9 | 11 | –2 | 11 |
| Denmark | 1 | 3 | 2 | 1 | 0 | 4 | 2 | +2 | 7 |
| New Zealand | 2 | 5 | 1 | 2 | 2 | 2 | 4 | –2 | 5 |
| Italy | 1 | 3 | 1 | 1 | 1 | 5 | 5 | 0 | 4 |
| (Brazil) São Paulo XI | 1 | 3 | 1 | 1 | 1 | 4 | 5 | –1 | 4 |
| Mexico | 1 | 2 | 1 | 0 | 1 | 2 | 3 | –1 | 3 |
| Brazil | 1 | 3 | 1 | 0 | 2 | 2 | 3 | –1 | 3 |
| England | 1 | 2 | 0 | 2 | 0 | 0 | 0 | 0 | 2 |
| Chinese Taipei | 1 | 2 | 0 | 0 | 2 | 0 | 2 | –2 | 0 |
| Netherlands | 1 | 3 | 0 | 0 | 3 | 0 | 4 | –4 | 0 |
| Argentina | 1 | 3 | 0 | 0 | 3 | 0 | 8 | –8 | 0 |

== Awards ==
| Year | Golden Ball | Golden Shoe |
|---|---|---|
| 2006 | (United States) Kristine Lilly | (Canada) Christine Sinclair (6) |
| 2008 | (United States) Angela Hucles | (Canada) Christine Sinclair (5) |
| 2010 | (South Korea) Jeon Ga-eul | (Australia) Kate Gill (3) |

== See also ==
- Peace Cup
