= Peace Cup =

- Organiser(s): Sunmoon Peace Football Foundation (Unification Church)
- Founded: 2003
- Abolished: 2012
- Region: International
- Teams: 8 or 12
- Most championships: (Netherlands) PSV Eindhoven (England) Tottenham Hotspur (France) Lyon (England) Aston Villa (Germany) Hamburger SV (1 title each)
- Website: peacecup.com

The Peace Cup was an invitational pre-season friendly football tournament for clubs, held every two years by the Sunmoon Peace Football Foundation.

== History ==
The Peace Cup was held every two years, with the Sunmoon Peace Football Foundation inviting football clubs from various nations. A corresponding event featuring women's national teams, the Peace Queen Cup, began in 2006. In October 2012, it was announced that the Peace Cup will no longer be held, following the death of Unification Church founder Sun Myung Moon.

== Format ==
From 2003 to 2007, the Peace Cup was played between 8 clubs, divided into two groups of 4 teams. The winner of each group qualified for the final, which was played in a single match.

The first three competitions were held in South Korea, and the 2009 version was held in Madrid and Andalusia, Spain with 12 teams participating. The fifth competition took place again in South Korea in July 2012, and four teams which had South Korean players entered.

== Participants ==
South Korea's Seongnam Ilhwa Chunma participated in every tournament. Previous winners were PSV, Tottenham Hotspur, Lyon, Aston Villa, and Hamburger SV, who were the final champions.

== Prize ==
From 2003 to 2007, the prize money of the tournament was approximately €2 million for the winning team, and €500,000 for the runners-up.

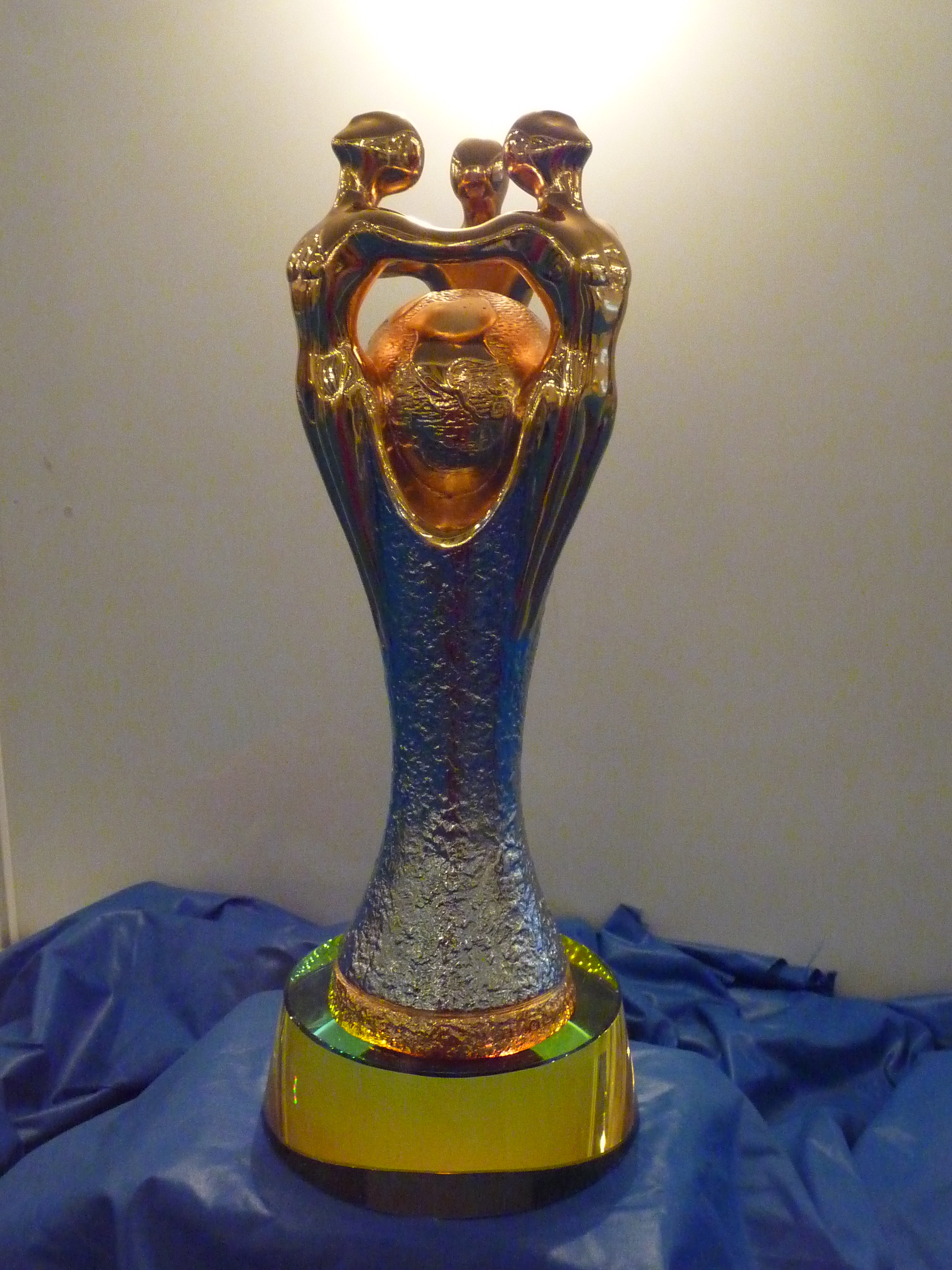
The trophy

== Results ==
=== Finals ===
Year	Host	Champions	Score	Runners-up	Clubs
2003	South Korea	(Netherlands) PSV Eindhoven	1–0	(France) Lyon	8
2005	South Korea	(England) Tottenham Hotspur	3–1	(France) Lyon	8
2007	South Korea	(France) Lyon	1–0	(England) Bolton Wanderers	8
2009	Spain	(England) Aston Villa	0–0 (a.e.t.) (4–3 p)	(Italy) Juventus	12
2012	South Korea	(Germany) Hamburger SV	1–0	(South Korea) Seongnam Ilhwa Chunma	4

== Awards ==
The "Golden Ball" was awarded to the best player of the tournament on the basis of a vote among the accredited media. There were also "Silver Ball" and "Bronze Ball" for the second and third best players respectively.

Year	Golden Ball	Golden Shoe
2003	(South Korea) Park Ji-sung	(Netherlands) Mark van Bommel (2)
2005	(Republic of Ireland) Robbie Keane	(Republic of Ireland) Robbie Keane (4)
2007	(France) Karim Benzema	(Sweden) Kim Källström (2)
2009	(England) Ashley Young	(Brazil) Hulk (3)
2012	(Sweden) Marcus Berg	(Netherlands) Mitchell Schet (2)

== Controversy ==
The original name of the competition was to be Sunmoon Peace Cup, named after the founder. However, after being criticized, the organization changed its name to the World Peace King Cup. Before the inauguration, the Asian Football Confederation warned that the term "world" can only be used by competitions organized by FIFA, and "king" by competitions held by a kingdom.

== See also ==
- Korea Cup
- Peace Queen Cup
