= 2007 Peace Cup =

2007 Peace Cup Korea

Tournament details
- Host country: South Korea
- Dates: 12–21 July 2007
- Teams: 8 (from 4 confederations)
- Venues: 7 (in 7 host cities)

Final positions
- Champions: (France) Lyon (1st title)

Tournament statistics
- Matches played: 13
- Goals scored: 24 (1.85 per match)
- Top scorer(s): 7 players (2 goals each)
- Best player(s): Karim Benzema (Lyon)

The 2007 Peace Cup Korea was the third competition of the Peace Cup. Lyon won the title after defeating Bolton Wanderers 1–0 in the final.

== Teams ==
Team	League
(England) Bolton Wanderers	2007–08 Premier League
(Mexico) Guadalajara	2007–08 Primera División de México
(France) Lyon	2007–08 Ligue 1
(Spain) Racing Santander	2007–08 La Liga
(England) Reading	2007–08 Premier League
(Argentina) River Plate	2007–08 Argentine Primera División
(South Korea) Seongnam Ilhwa Chunma	2007 K League
(Japan) Shimizu S-Pulse	2007 J.League Division 1

== Venues ==
Seoul	Suwon	Seongnam	Goyang
Seoul World Cup Stadium	Suwon World Cup Stadium	Tancheon Sports Complex	Goyang Stadium
Capacity: 66,806	Capacity: 43,959	Capacity: 16,250	Capacity: 41,311
2007 Peace Cup is located in South Korea
Daegu	Busan	Gwangyang	
Daegu Stadium	Busan Asiad Main Stadium	Gwangyang Football Stadium	
Capacity: 66,422	Capacity: 53,864	Capacity: 20,009	

== Group stage ==
=== Group A ===
Team	Pld	W	D	L	GF	GA	GD	Pts
(England) Bolton Wanderers	3	2	1	0	5	2	+3	7
(Mexico) Guadalajara	3	2	0	1	6	2	+4	6
(South Korea) Seongnam Ilhwa Chunma	3	0	2	1	1	2	–1	2
(Spain) Racing Santander	3	0	1	2	1	7	–6	1

12 July 2007
19:00 KST (UTC+9)

Seongnam Ilhwa Chunma (South Korea)	1–1	(England) Bolton Wanderers
Nam Ki-il 87'		Nolan 78'

Seoul World Cup Stadium, Seoul

12 July 2007
20:00 KST (UTC+9)

Guadalajara (Mexico)	5–0	(Spain) Racing Santander
Santana 15'; Nava 18'; Padilla 57', 68'; Morales 90'

Gwangyang Football Stadium, Gwangyang

14 July 2007
20:00 KST (UTC+9)

Seongnam Ilhwa Chunma (South Korea)	0–0	(Spain) Racing Santander

Tancheon Sports Complex, Seongnam

14 July 2007
20:00 KST (UTC+9)

Bolton Wanderers (England)	2–0	(Mexico) Guadalajara
Harsányi 46'; Nolan 76'

Daegu Stadium, Daegu

17 July 2007
20:00 KST (UTC+9)

Guadalajara (Mexico)	1–0	(South Korea) Seongnam Ilhwa Chunma
Santana 80'

Gwangyang Football Stadium, Gwangyang

17 July 2007
20:00 KST (UTC+9)

Racing Santander (Spain)	1–2	(England) Bolton Wanderers
Colsa 26'		Anelka 58', 69'

Goyang Stadium, Goyang

=== Group B ===
Team	Pld	W	D	L	GF	GA	GD	Pts
(France) Lyon	3	2	0	1	5	2	3	6
(England) Reading	3	2	0	1	2	1	1	6
(Argentina) River Plate	3	2	0	1	3	3	0	6
(Japan) Shimizu S-Pulse	3	0	0	3	0	4	–4	0

13 July 2007
20:00 KST (UTC+9)

Shimizu S-Pulse (Japan)	0–2	(France) Lyon
		Benzema 29'; Mounier 86'

Busan Asiad Main Stadium, Busan

13 July 2007
20:00 KST (UTC+9)

Reading (England)	0–1	(Argentina) River Plate
		Abelairas 28'

Suwon World Cup Stadium, Suwon

16 July 2007
20:00 KST (UTC+9)

River Plate (Argentina)	1–0	(Japan) Shimizu S-Pulse
Abelairas 33'

Busan Asiad Main Stadium, Busan

16 July 2007
20:00 KST (UTC+9)

Reading (England)	1–0	(France) Lyon
Cox 62'

Seoul World Cup Stadium, Seoul

19 July 2007
20:00 KST (UTC+9)

Shimizu S-Pulse (Japan)	0–1	(England) Reading
		Gunnarsson 69'

Goyang Stadium, Goyang

19 July 2007
20:00 KST (UTC+9)

Lyon (France)	3–1	(Argentina) River Plate
Benzema 6'; Ben Arfa 24'; Källström 90+3' (pen.)		Ruben 14'

Suwon World Cup Stadium, Suwon

== Final ==
21 July 2007
22:30 KST (UTC+9)

Lyon (France)	1–0	(England) Bolton Wanderers
Källström 86'

Seoul World Cup Stadium, Seoul

== Goalscorers ==
2 goals

- (Argentina) Matías Abelairas (River Plate)
- (England) Kevin Nolan (Bolton Wanderers)
- (France) Nicolas Anelka (Bolton Wanderers)
- (France) Karim Benzema (Lyon)
- (Mexico) Jesús Padilla (Guadalajara)
- (Mexico) Sergio Santana (Guadalajara)
- (Sweden) Kim Källström (Lyon)

1 goal

- (Argentina) Marco Ruben (River Plate)
- (England) Simon Cox (Reading)
- (France) Anthony Mounier (Lyon)
- (France) Hatem Ben Arfa (Lyon)
- (Iceland) Brynjar Gunnarsson (Reading)
- (South Korea) Nam Ki-il (Seongnam Ilhwa Chunma)
- (Mexico) Julio Nava (Guadalajara)
- (Mexico) Jesús Morales (Guadalajara)
- (Slovakia) Zoltán Harsányi (Bolton Wanderers)
- (Spain) Gonzalo Colsa (Racing Santander)

== Broadcasting rights ==
Country	Broadcaster(s)	Ref.
England	Setanta Sports	
South Korea	SBS	
Spain	LaSexta, TV3 (only opening match)	
