= Lucy Wood (field hockey) =

English field hockey player

Personal information
- Nationality: English
- Born: 22 February 1994 (age 32) Crawley
- Height: 5’4
- Weight: 137 lb (62 kg)

Sport
- Country: Great Britain; England
- Sport: Field hockey
- Position: Forward
Medal record
Representing England
Commonwealth Games
Silver medal – second place	2014 Glasgow	Team

Lucy Wood (born 22 February 1994) is an English international field hockey player who plays as a forward for England and Great Britain.

She plays club hockey in the Investec Women's Hockey League Premier Division for Buckingham Hockey Club.

She has also played for Horsham, East Grinstead, Sevenoaks, Holcombe and Slough.

She competed for England in the women's hockey tournament at the 2014 Commonwealth Games where she won a silver medal.
