= Ekaterina Stepanenko =

Russian footballer (born 1983)

Personal information
- Full name: Ekaterina Stepanenko
- Date of birth: 21 May 1983 (age 43)
- Place of birth: Krasnoyarsk, Soviet Union
- Height: 1.62 m (5 ft 4 in)
- Position: Midfielder

Senior career*
Years	Team	Apps	(Gls)
2000–2004	FC Energy Voronezh		
?–2008	Ryazan-VDV		
2009	FC Energy Voronezh	11	(2)
2010–2014	Izmailovo Moscow	69	(11)

International career^{‡}
2001	Russia U-19	3	(0)
2011	Russia	9	(0)
- * Club domestic league appearances and goals as of 13 July 2013 ‡ National team caps and goals as of 13 July 2013

Ekaterina Stepanenko (born 21 May 1983) is a former Russian footballer. She played as a midfielder for Izmailovo Moscow and the Russia national team.

== Club career ==
She played for FC Energy Voronezh before joining Izmailovo Moscow in 2010.

== International career ==
She was called up to be part of the national team for the UEFA Women's Euro 2013.

== Personal life ==
Stepanenko was born in Krasnoyarsk.

== Honours ==
Izmailovo Moscow

Runner-up

- Russian Women's Cup: 2013
